= 2007–08 Paris Saint-Germain FC season =

38th season in existence of Paris Saint-Germain

Paris Saint-Germain
2007–08 season
- President: Alain Cayzac (until April 2008); Simon Tahar (from April 2008)
- Manager: Paul Le Guen
- Stadium: Parc des Princes
- Ligue 1: 16th
- Coupe de France: Runners-up
- Coupe de la Ligue: Winners
- Top goalscorer: League: Amara Diané (11); All: Pauleta; Amara Diané (15 each)
- Highest home attendance: 45,353 vs Saint-Étienne (10 May 2008)
- Lowest home attendance: 15,000 vs Bastia (18 March 2008)
- Average home league attendance: 36,755
Home colours	Away colours

The 2007–08 season was Paris Saint-Germain's 38th season in existence. PSG played their home league games at the Parc des Princes in Paris, registering an average attendance of 36,755 spectators per match. Alain Cayzac presided the club until April 2008, when Simon Tahar replaced him. The team was coached by Paul Le Guen. Pauleta was the team captain.

== News ==
Sylvain Armand extended his contract with Paris Saint Germain until 2011. The divorce between Paul Le Guen and Fabrice Pancrate was definitive. The player refused to participate during the pre-season and the LFP suspended his contract with PSG. Jérôme Rothen signed an extension to his deal with Paris Saint Germain and was now tied to the Parc des Princes until 2011. PSG officially launched www.psg.tv, their very own web TV channel, only available over the internet. PSG.TV broadcasts exclusive content including: interviews with players, re-runs of classic matches, exclusive reports, press conferences, training sessions at the Camp des Loges and footage showing snippets of life inside the club. Francis Borelli, historic president of Paris Saint-Germain, died following a long illness. Two minutes of silence were observed at the Parc des Princes before a match against Rennes in his memory. PSG fans displayed a giant banner dedicated to President Francis Borelli: "25 years later it is Le Parc who bows before you President". The banner referred to a memorable scene during the 1982 French Cup final between PSG and Saint-Étienne. Francis Borelli rushed to the field and kissed the lawn of the Parc des Princes after Dominique Rocheteau scored an extra-time equalizer a few seconds before the final whistle to force a penalty shootout. Jean-Marc Pilorget transformed the match-winning penalty and gave PSG their first major trophy. Jérôme Rothen was named "Player of the Month" for September by the UNFP with 60% of the votes.

Mamadou Sakho became PSG's youngest ever captain after wearing the armband on his league debut − aged 17 − against Valenciennes. Paris Saint-Germain fans clashed with police before the game at Auxerre. The fans had been waiting for the bus carrying the PSG players, which used another entrance. Paris Saint-Germain recorded their first victory away to Auxerre since 1999. Following their loss to Toulouse at the Parc des Princes during Week 18, PSG recorded their worst start to a season at home in their history. For the first time the club from the capital finished the first half of the league campaign without a single victory as hosts. Paris Saint-Germain recorded their first victory away to Saint-Étienne since 1994. PSG launched www.leparcdesprinces.fr, the official website of the Parc des Princes. "Welcome to the Parc des Princes website ! To know all about this French monument, its history, its plans, and its news (sports, culture and promotional events) go into the pages of its official website, entirely devoted to the Paris stadium". Walter Butler, head of Butler Capital Partners, sold most of its shares to Colony Capital, which now owned 68% of the Parisian club. The group led by Sébastien Bazin in France became the majority shareholder of Paris Saint-Germain. Loris Arnaud signed a new two-year contract extension until June 2010. Guyanese singer Henri Salvador died in Paris aged 90. Supporter of Paris Saint-Germain since the early 1970s, Henri Salvador had four lifetime subscriptions at the Parc des Princes since the Hechter era. The club was in a bad financial situation and Daniel Hechter asked his friends to get their hands in their pockets. Hechter offered a lifetime subscription at Le Parc for all matches of PSG in exchange for 10,000 francs in donations. Henri Salvador took four. According to a survey made by magazine France Football, the Parc des Princes was the favorite stadium of Ligue 1 players. Paris Saint-Germain fans decided to protest against the club's poor form by boycotting the first 15 minutes of every home match since December to show their discontent.

Alain Cayzac, president of Paris Saint Germain, resigned from his position after his team was thrashed by Caen, dropping deeper into relegation zone. PSG were going through their worst ever crisis with relegation to the second division looming. With four league games remaining PSG sat 18th out of 20, just above already-relegated Metz and three points behind fourth from bottom Lens. Several PSG players' cars were attacked by irate supporters, some of whom spray-painted threats on walls at the club's training ground at Saint-Germain-en-Laye. The club hired Michel Moulin as director of sport to work alongside Le Guen. Simon Tahar was appointed president of Paris Saint-Germain. Reading "Paedophiles, unemployed and inbred: Welcome to the Sticks", the banner was displayed at the League Cup final, of which French President Nicolas Sarkozy was in attendance. As well as disbanding the "Boulogne Boys" - who are considered one of the oldest hooligan groups in France - an inquiry into finding and punishing those responsible was launched. Lens mayor Guy Delcourt wanted the match to be replayed after the racist banner incident. The match was not replayed, but PSG were fined and banned from the following edition. The measure was later overturned on appeal. Pauleta said goodbye to the Parc des Princes after PSG's last home match of the season against Saint-Étienne. PSG fans unfurled a giant banner dedicated to Pauleta: "Your name and our colors forever linked". Following their victory away to Sochaux, Paris Saint-Germain avoided relegation in the last match of the season and ensured their continuity in the top-flight. Pauleta, Portugal and PSG's all-time leading goalscorer, announced his retirement at the end of the season. The Portuguese striker, surnamed "The Eagle of Azores", scored 110 goals for Paris Saint-Germain. Pauleta was honored for his career achievements. Mayor of Paris Bertrand Delanoë awarded Pauleta the Great Vermeil Medal of the City of Paris during a press conference at the Hôtel de Ville de Paris. President Simon Tahar and sports councillor Michel Moulin resigned.

== Transfers ==
In

No.	Pos.	Nat.	Name	Age	EU	Moving from	Type	Transfer window	Ends	Transfer fee	Source
16	GK	(France)	Alphonse Areola	17	EU	Youth system	Promoted ✓		2012	N/A	All PSG
31	AM	(Mali)	Adama Touré	19	EU	Youth system	Promoted ✓			N/A	All PSG
	AM	(France)	Abdallah Yaisien	16	EU	Youth system	Signed ✓		2012	N/A	PSG.FR
25	LM	(France)	Jérôme Rothen	32	EU	MKE Ankaragücü (Turkey)	Loan Return ✓	Summer	2011	N/A	Ligue 1
18	FW	(France)	Loris Arnaud	23	EU	Clermont	Loan Return ✓	Summer	2012	N/A	
12	CM	(France)	Mathieu Bodmer	27	EU	Lyon	Signed ✓	Summer	2013	€2.5M	Ligue 1
19	LW	(Brazil)	Nenê	29	EU	Monaco	Signed ✓	Summer	2013	€5.5M	Ligue 1
	FW	(Gabon)	Stéphane N'Guéma	29	EU	Beauvais	Signed ✓	Summer	2011	Free	France Football
5	LB	(Ivory Coast)	Siaka Tiéné	28	Non-EU	Valenciennes	Signed ✓	Summer	2013	€1M	Ligue 1

Total spending: ▼€9 million

Out

No.	Pos.	Nat.	Name	Age	EU	Moving to	Type	Transfer window	Transfer fee	Source
12	DM	(Cameroon)	Albert Baning	22	Non-EU	Sedan	Loaned ✓	Summer		PSG.fr
16	GK	(France)	Willy Grondin	35	EU		Contract Ended ✓	Summer	Free	LMD PSG
17	RM	(France)	Granddi Ngoyi	22	EU	Brest	Loaned ✓	Summer	N/A	PSG.FR
	DM	(Cameroon)	Albert Baning	25	EU	Maccabi Tel Aviv (Israel)	Contract Ended ✓	Summer	Free	All PSG
	DF	(France)	Maxime Partouche	22	EU	Panionios (Greece)	Contract Ended ✓	Summer	Free	Planete PSG
	GK	(France)	Alexandre Letellier	19	EU	Angers	Contract Ended ✓	Summer	Free	PSGteam
	DF	(France)	Kévin Afougou	20	EU	Paris	Contract Ended ✓	Summer	Free	Le Parisien
	DF	(Ivory Coast)	Brice Dja Djédjé	19	EU	Évian	Contract Ended ✓	Summer	Free	L'Alsace
	MF	(Mali)	Bassirou Dembélé	20	EU	Slavia Prague (Czech Republic)	Contract Ended ✓	Summer	Free	LMD PSG
	FW	(France)	Yoann Arquin	22	EU		Contract Ended ✓	Summer	Free	Only One Paris SG
	MF	(France)	Abdelaziz Barrada	21	EU	Getafe	Contract Ended ✓	Summer	Free	Espoirs du Football
18	FW	(France)	Loris Arnaud	23	EU	Angers	Loaned ✓	Summer	N/A	PSG.FR
27	FW	(France)	Younousse Sankharé	20	EU	Dijon	Loaned ✓	Summer	N/A	PSG.FR
25	MF	(France)	Jérôme Rothen	32	EU		Contract Terminated ✓		Free	ESPN
14	FW	(Serbia)	Mateja Kežman	31	EU		Contract Terminated ✓		Free	Goal.com

Total income: ▲€0 million

== Squad information ==
N	Pos.	Nat.	Name	Age	EU	Since	App	Goals	Ends	Transfer fee	Notes
1	GK	(France)	Grégory Coupet	35	EU	2009	17	0	2011	€1M	
2	RB	(Brazil)	Ceará	27	Non-EU	2007	80	1	2012	€2.5M	
3	CB	(France)	Mamadou Sakho	18	EU	2006	91	1	2012	Youth system	
4	DM	(France)	Claude Makélélé (captain)	35	EU	2008	76	1	2011	Free	
5	LB	(Ivory Coast)	Siaka Tiéné	26	Non-EU	2010	0	0	2013	€1M	
6	CB	(France)	Zoumana Camara	29	EU	2007	128	1	2012	€6M	
7	RW	(France)	Ludovic Giuly	31	EU	2008	80	13	2011	€2.5M	
8	FW	(France)	Péguy Luyindula	28	EU	2006	138	29	2012	€2.5M	
9	FW	(France)	Guillaume Hoarau	24	EU	2008	75	28	2013	€0.5M	
10	AM	(Benin)	Stéphane Sessègnon	23	Non-EU	2008	82	10	2013	€8M	
11	FW	(Ivory Coast)	Amara Diané	25	Non-EU	2009	17	5	2008	€2.3M	
12	CM	(France)	Mathieu Bodmer	25	EU	2010	0	0	2013	€2.5M	
13	CB	(Mali)	Sammy Traoré	32	EU	2006	88	4	2011	€1.5M	
16	GK	(France)	Alphonse Areola	15	EU	2010	0	0		Youth system	
17	RM	(France)	Granddi Ngoyi	20	EU	2007	33	0	2013	Youth system	
18	FW	(France)	Loris Arnaud	21	EU	2007	30	4	2012	Youth system	
20	CM	(France)	Clément Chantôme	20	EU	2006	133	5	2012	Youth system	
21	FW	(France)	Jean-Eudes Maurice	21	EU	2008	29	3	2012	Youth system	
22	LB	(France)	Sylvain Armand (VC1)	27	EU	2004	278	9	2012	€3.5M	
23	DM	(France)	Jérémy Clément	23	EU	2006	148	6	2012	€2.2M	
24	LM	(France)	Tripy Makonda	18	EU	2008	10	0	2012	Youth system	
26	RB	(France)	Christophe Jallet	24	EU	2009	43	3	2013	€2.5M	
27	RM	(France)	Younousse Sankharé	18	EU	2007	47	1	2012	Youth system	
30	GK	(Armenia)	Apoula Edel	21	EU	2008	34	0	2011	€0.12M	
31	AM	(Mali)	Adama Touré	16	EU	2010	0	0		Youth system	
	FW	(Brazil)	Éverton Santos	21	Non-EU	2008	3	0	2012	€2M	

- Source: Ligue 1, Players in / out and Wikipedia players' articles

== Kits ==
Dubai-based airline Fly Emirates was the shirt sponsor. American sportswear brand Nike was the kit manufacturer.

Home	Away

== Board & Staff ==
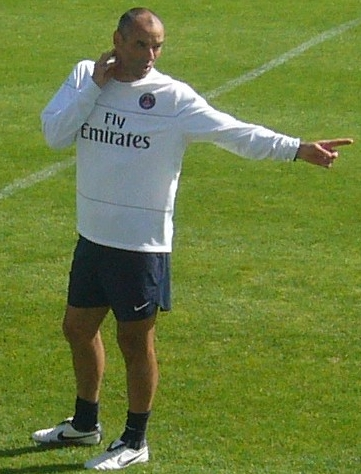
Paul Le Guen.

Manager	(France) Paul Le Guen
Sports Councillor	(France) Michel Moulin
Assistant Coach	(France) Yves Colleu
Goalkeeping Coach	(France) Christian Mas
Physical Trainer	(France) Stéphane Wiertelak
Head Doctor	(France) Éric Rolland
Physiotherapists	(France) Bruno Le Natur, Joël Le Hir, Pascal Roche

Source: Ligue 1

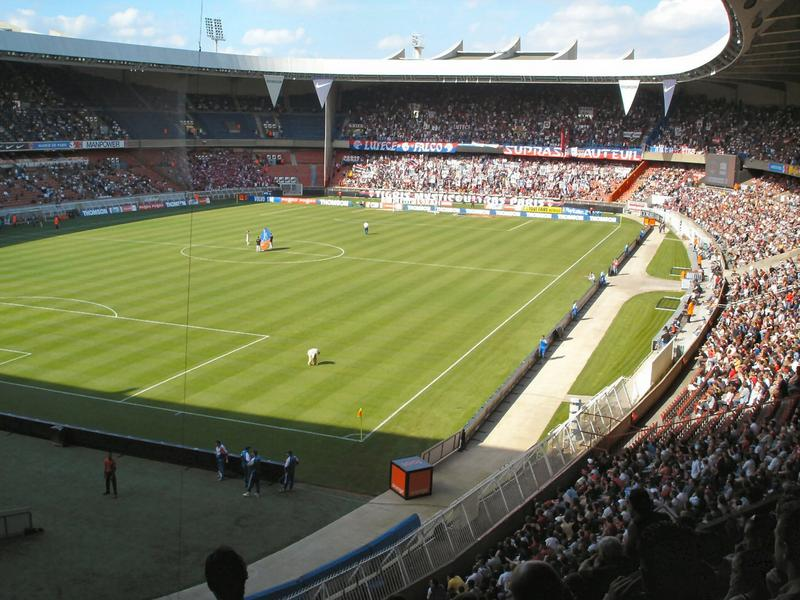
Parc des Princes.

President	(France) Simon Tahar
General Manager	(France) Phillipe Boindrieux
Communications	(France) Jean-Philippe D'Hallivillee
Recruitment	(France) Alain Roche
Amateur Section	(France) Simon Tahar
Academy Director	(France) Bertrand Reuzeau
Ground (capacity and dimensions)	Parc des Princes (48,712 / 252m x 191m)

Source: Ligue 1

== Friendly tournaments ==
=== Emirates Cup ===
Each team plays two matches, with three points awarded for a win, one point for a draw, and a point for every goal scored.

Pos	Team	Pld	W	D	L	GF	GA	GD	Pts
1	Arsenal	2	2	0	0	4	2	+2	10
2	Paris Saint-Germain	2	1	0	1	4	2	+2	7
3	Valencia	2	1	0	1	2	3	−1	5
4	Inter Milan	2	0	0	2	1	4	−3	1

Source: RSSSF

28 July 2007 1	Arsenal	2–1	Paris Saint-Germain	London, England
16:15 BST	Flamini 44'; Bendtner 69'	Report 1 Report 2	Luyindula 80'	Stadium: Emirates Stadium; Attendance: 55,106; Referee: Peter Walton (England)

29 July 2007 2	Paris Saint-Germain	3–0	Valencia	London, England
14:00 BST	Diané 15'; Ngog 30'; Luyindula 84'	Report		Stadium: Emirates Stadium; Attendance: 59,821; Referee: Andre Marriner (England)

== Competitions ==
=== Ligue 1 ===
Paris Saint-Germain and Sochaux shared the points in a close encounter in Paris as neither side forced a breakthrough. A goalless draw at the Stade Félix-Bollaert saw Lens and PSG win a point apiece in a game containing few clear cut chances. PSG slumped to their first defeat of the season, a campaign in which they were yet to win, as Lorient stunned a packed Parc des Princes crowd with a comeback win. Paris Saint-Germain picked up a point after a goalless draw with Metz at the Stade Saint-Symphorien. A Pierre-Alain Frau goal three minutes from time handed PSG a precious point at the Parc des Princes as the capital club came back from a goal down to record yet another draw against Lille. Sylvain Armand and Amara Diané secured PSG's first victory of the season away to Le Mans. PSG and Olympique de Marseille played out a draw at the Parc des Princes as Djibril Cissé and Péguy Luyindula netted early goals. A goal each from Sylvain Armand and Amara Diané prove enough for PSG as they beat Monaco at the Stade Louis II, a late Jérémy Ménez free-kick nothing but a consolation for Ricardo Gomes' men. PSG fell to their second defeat of the season with a reverse to Bordeaux, Johan Micoud and David Bellion scoring the goals for "Les Girondins". A goal and an assist from former playmaker Jérôme Leroy condemned PSG to a third league defeat of the season as Rennes continued their impressive start. High-flying Valenciennes missed a golden opportunity to take fourth spot in Ligue 1 after being held to a goalless draw by struggling Paris Saint-Germain at the Stade Nungesser. Lyon overcame a spirited PSG side in the capital to extend their lead at the top of the table, Sidney Govou's goal the clincher.

Two goals in the opening 20 minutes set Paris Saint-Germain on the way to three much-needed points at Strasbourg, a victory that lifted "Les Parisiens" well clear of the relegation zone. PSG were still waiting for their first home win of the season after they could only draw against high-flying visitors Nancy at the Parc des Princes. PSG lost away to Nice to relinquish the honour of being the last unbeaten team on the road in Ligue 1. The defeat saw Paul Le Guen's side slip into the relegation zone. A nightmare season continued in the French capital as a terrible defensive error from Ceará gifted Caen victory at the Parc des Princes and left PSG mired in the relegation zone after yet another shocking result. At blustery Auxerre, PSG recorded a fine win to move out of the bottom three, Péguy Luyindula heading home the game's only goal. Johan Elmander continued his fantastic scoring form with another two goals as Toulouse performed a textbook smash and grab at the Parc des Princes and took home all three points. A solitary Péguy Luyindula goal saw off Saint-Étienne, "Les Parisiens" surviving a first-half onslaught to steal all three points with a narrow victory. Amara Diané scored twice for PSG to record the club's first league home win of the season and leave Lens empty-handed in a one-sided encounter at the Parc des Princes. Grégory Bourillon's first-half own goal brought an end to PSG's resurgent run of form as Lorient claimed a deserved victory over Paul Le Guen's capital outfit at the Stade du Moustoir. PSG moved up to 12th in the Ligue 1 table with an emphatic win over relegation candidates Metz at the Parc des Princes. Lille and Paris Saint-Germain played out a goalless draw, a result that did little to ease both sides' relegation fears.

Paris Saint-Germain and Le Mans shoot blanks in a tactical encounter at the Parc des Princes. Mamadou Niang was the hero for Marseille as the Senegal striker hit the winner in a victory over bitter rivals PSG at the Stade Vélodrome. A late error from Paris-Saint-German goalkeeper Mickaël Landreau gifted visitors Monaco a point at the Parc des Princes. A Wendel hat-trick blasted PSG away as Bordeaux hanged on to the heels of Lyon at the top of Ligue 1. Jimmy Briand inspired Rennes to a victory over PSG to ease the pressure on the Brittany team. Pauleta's late equalizer against Valenciennes kept PSG out of the relegation zone after yet another game in which good chances were spurned by Paul Le Guen's ailing side. Alain Perrin's Lyon romped to a win over relegation candidates PSG with goals from Fred, Sidney Govou and Juninho. Many PSG fans suggested that catch-up Ligue 1 game against Strasbourg was just as important to their relegation-haunted team as the League Cup Final - and sub Amara Diané's goal gave them a precious win. Nancy maintained their season-long unbeaten home run with a win over PSG, a Marc-Antoine Fortuné goal sending the League Cup winners to another league defeat. PSG remained in great danger near the foot of Ligue 1 following a home defeat to Nice, Bakari Koné and Ederson winning the game for "Les Aiglons" in the last eight minutes. Paris Saint-Germain's nightmare season in Ligue 1 continued, with Paul Le Guen's ailing side looking prime candidates for relegation after a hapless defeat at Caen. Amara Diané scored two goals as PSG beat Auxerre and kept alive their hopes of avoiding relegation. Toulouse's Mohamed Fofana denied fellow relegation strugglers Paris Saint-Germain a vital three points with a late equalizer. Jérémy Clément notched his first Ligue 1 goal of the season as Paul Le Guen's side mounted a second-half fightback against in-form Saint-Étienne and climbed out of the bottom three with just one game to go. Two goals from Amara Diané preserved Paris Saint-Germain's Ligue 1 status after a nerve-jangling encounter at Sochaux.

==== League table ====
Pos	Team	Pld	W	D	L	GF	GA	GD	Pts	Qualification or relegation
14	Sochaux	38	10	14	14	34	43	−9	44	
15	Auxerre	38	12	8	18	33	52	−19	44	
16	Paris Saint-Germain	38	10	13	15	37	45	−8	43	Qualification to UEFA Cup first round (Note: Paris Saint-Germain was qualified for the 2008–09 UEFA Cup as winners of the 2007–08 Coupe de la Ligue.)
17	Toulouse	38	9	15	14	36	42	−6	42	
18	Lens (R)	38	9	13	16	43	52	−9	40	Relegation to Ligue 2

Source: Ligue 1
Rules for classification: 1) points; 2) goal difference; 3) number of goals scored.
(R) Relegated

==== Results summary ====
Overall								Home						Away					
Pld	W	D	L	GF	GA	GD	Pts	W	D	L	GF	GA	GD	W	D	L	GF	GA	GD
38	10	13	15	37	45	−8	43	4	8	7	22	23	−1	6	5	8	15	22	−7

Source: Ligue 1

==== Results by round ====
Round	1	2	3	4	5	6	7	8	9	10	11	12	13	14	15	16	17	18	19	20	21	22	23	24	25	26	27	28	29	30	31	32	33	34	35	36	37	38
Ground	H	A	H	A	H	A	H	A	H	H	A	H	A	H	A	H	A	H	A	H	A	H	A	H	A	H	A	A	H	A	H	A	H	A	H	A	H	A
Result	D	D	L	D	D	W	D	W	L	L	D	L	W	D	L	L	W	L	W	W	L	W	D	D	L	D	L	L	D	L	W	L	L	L	W	D	D	W
Position	11	12	17	15	15	13	13	11	13	14	14	16	15	14	18	18	17	18	17	12	15	13	13	13	16	16	17	17	17	18	17	18	18	18	18	18	16	16

Source: Ligue 1
A = Away; H = Home; W = Win; D = Draw; L = Loss

==== Matches ====
4 August 2007 1	Paris Saint-Germain	0–0	Sochaux	Paris
20:00				Stadium: Parc des Princes; Attendance: 37,400; Referee: Saïd Ennjimi

12 August 2007 2	Lens	0–0	Paris Saint-Germain	Lens
21:00				Stadium: Stade Félix-Bollaert; Attendance: 38,824; Referee: Stéphane Bré

15 August 2007 3	Paris Saint-Germain	1–3	Lorient	Paris
20:30	Pauleta 36'		Vahirua 69', 74'; Saïfi 90+2' (pen.)	Stadium: Parc des Princes; Attendance: 32,227; Referee: Jean-Charles Cailleux

18 August 2007 4	Metz	0–0	Paris Saint-Germain	Metz
20:00				Stadium: Stade Saint-Symphorien; Attendance: 19,018; Referee: Thierry Auriac

26 August 2007 5	Paris Saint-Germain	1–1	Lille	Paris
18:00	Frau 87'		Makoun 43'	Stadium: Parc des Princes; Attendance: 31,634; Referee: Fredy Fautrel

29 August 2007 6	Le Mans	0–2	Paris Saint-Germain	Le Mans
20:30			Armand 37'; Diané 54'	Stadium: Stade Léon-Bollée; Attendance: 13,072; Referee: Éric Poulat

2 September 2007 7	Paris Saint-Germain	1–1	Marseille	Paris
18:00	Luyindula 20'		Cissé 10'	Stadium: Parc des Princes; Attendance: 43,419; Referee: Stéphane Lannoy

16 September 2007 8	Monaco	1–2	Paris Saint-Germain	Fontvieille
16:00	Ménez 85'		Armand 40'; Diané 53'	Stadium: Stade Louis II; Attendance: 12,694; Referee: Bertrand Layec

23 September 2007 9	Paris Saint-Germain	0–2	Bordeaux	Paris
18:00			Micoud 10'; Bellion 47'	Stadium: Parc des Princes; Attendance: 37,108; Referee: Tony Chapron

6 October 2007 10	Paris Saint-Germain	1–3	Rennes	Paris
19:00	Ceará 57'		Leroy 19'; Briand 74'; Wiltord 84'	Stadium: Parc des Princes; Attendance: 35,436; Referee: Philippe Malige

20 October 2007 11	Valenciennes	0–0	Paris Saint-Germain	Valenciennes
16:00				Stadium: Stade Nungesser; Attendance: 15,037; Referee: Olivier Thual

28 October 2007 12	Paris Saint-Germain	2–3	Lyon	Paris
21:00	Pauleta 61', 90+2'		Ben Arfa 40', 43'; Govou 84'	Stadium: Parc des Princes; Attendance: 39,787; Referee: Laurent Duhamel

3 November 2007 13	Strasbourg	1–2	Paris Saint-Germain	Strasbourg
20:00	Rentería 50'		Rodrigo 7' (o.g.); Arnaud 19'	Stadium: Stade de la Meinau; Attendance: 25,770; Referee: Saïd Ennjimi

10 November 2007 14	Paris Saint-Germain	0–0	Nancy	Paris
20:00				Stadium: Parc des Princes; Attendance: 36,495; Referee: Lionel Jaffredo

25 November 2007 15	Nice	2–1	Paris Saint-Germain	Nice
21:00	Laslandes 8'; Koné 37'		Ngog 31'	Stadium: Stade du Ray; Attendance: 11,776; Referee: Tony Chapron

1 December 2007 16	Paris Saint-Germain	0–1	Caen	Paris
20:00			Florentin 76'	Stadium: Parc des Princes; Attendance: 37,148; Referee: Antony Gautier

9 December 2007 17	Auxerre	0–1	Paris Saint-Germain	Auxerre
20:55			Luyindula 50'	Stadium: Stade de l'Abbé-Deschamps; Attendance: 11,015; Referee: Bertrand Layec

15 December 2007 18	Paris Saint-Germain	1–2	Toulouse	Paris
15:00	Pauleta 90+1'		Elmander 42', 49'	Stadium: Parc des Princes; Attendance: 34,095; Referee: Stéphane Bré

23 December 2007 19	Saint-Étienne	0–1	Paris Saint-Germain	Saint-Étienne
21:00			Luyindula 51'	Stadium: Stade Geoffroy-Guichard; Attendance: 31,219; Referee: Fredy Fautrel

13 January 2008 20	Paris Saint-Germain	3–0	Lens	Paris
18:00	Pauleta 58'; Diané 65', 67'			Stadium: Parc des Princes; Attendance: 35,658; Referee: Éric Poulat

19 January 2008 21	Lorient	1–0	Paris Saint-Germain	Lorient
17:10	Bourillon 19' (o.g.)			Stadium: Stade du Moustoir; Attendance: 12,385; Referee: Thierry Auriac

23 January 2008 22	Paris Saint-Germain	3–0	Metz	Paris
20:30	Luyindula 5'; Rothen 35'; Diané 55'			Stadium: Parc des Princes; Attendance: 38,362; Referee: Alain Hamer

26 January 2008 23	Lille	0–0	Paris Saint-Germain	Villeneuve-d'Ascq
17:10				Stadium: Stadium Nord Lille Métropole; Attendance: 14,887; Referee: Bruno Ruffray

9 February 2008 24	Paris Saint-Germain	0–0	Le Mans	Paris
15:00				Stadium: Parc des Princes; Attendance: 39,370; Referee: Stéphane Moulin

17 February 2008 25	Marseille	2–1	Paris Saint-Germain	Marseille
20:55	Taiwo 36'; Niang 45'		Rothen 29'	Stadium: Stade Vélodrome; Attendance: 58,000; Referee: Bertrand Layec

23 February 2008 26	Paris Saint-Germain	1–1	Monaco	Paris
20:00	Diané 42'		Almirón 72'	Stadium: Parc des Princes; Attendance: 30,000; Referee: Fredy Fautrel

2 March 2008 27	Bordeaux	3–0	Paris Saint-Germain	Bordeaux
20:55	Wendel 33', 49', 51'			Stadium: Stade Chaban-Delmas; Attendance: 30,309; Referee: Stéphane Lannoy

8 March 2008 28	Rennes	2–0	Paris Saint-Germain	Rennes
17:10	Sakho 44' (o.g.); Briand 51'			Stadium: Stade de la Route de Lorient; Attendance: 27,523; Referee: Jean-Charles Cailleux

15 March 2008 29	Paris Saint-Germain	1–1	Valenciennes	Paris
20:00	Pauleta 82'		Ceará 52' (o.g.)	Stadium: Parc des Princes; Attendance: 32,368; Referee: Saïd Ennjimi

23 March 2008 30	Lyon	4–2	Paris Saint-Germain	Lyon
20:55	Fred 8', 36'; Govou 65'; Juninho 73'		Camara 45+2'; Rothen 52'	Stadium: Stade de Gerland; Attendance: 37,895; Referee: Philippe Kalt

2 April 2008 31	Paris Saint-Germain	1–0	Strasbourg	Paris
20:00	Diané 73'			Stadium: Parc des Princes; Attendance: 33,288; Referee: Philippe Malige

6 April 2008 32	Nancy	1–0	Paris Saint-Germain	Tomblaine
18:00	Fortuné 67'			Stadium: Stade Marcel Picot; Attendance: 19,474; Referee: Bertrand Layec

13 April 2008 33	Paris Saint-Germain	2–3	Nice	Paris
20:55	Luyindula 50'; Pauleta 76'		Koné 36', 83'; Ederson 86'	Stadium: Parc des Princes; Attendance: 35,918; Referee: Thierry Auriac

19 April 2008 34	Caen	3–0	Paris Saint-Germain	Caen
20:00	Deroin 52'; Lemaître 75'; Gouffran 89'			Stadium: Stade Michel d'Ornano; Attendance: 20,933; Referee: Alain Hamer

26 April 2008 35	Paris Saint-Germain	3–1	Auxerre	Paris
17:10	Pauleta 3'; Diané 13', 86'		Mignot 78'	Stadium: Parc des Princes; Attendance: 37,671; Referee: Damien Ledentu

3 May 2008 36	Toulouse	1–1	Paris Saint-Germain	Toulouse
19:00	Fofana 87'		Mendy 63'	Stadium: Stadium de Toulouse; Attendance: 32,153; Referee: Fredy Fautrel

10 May 2008 37	Paris Saint-Germain	1–1	Saint-Étienne	Paris
20:45	Clément 60'		Perrin 44'	Stadium: Parc des Princes; Attendance: 45,353; Referee: Bruno Coué

17 May 2008 38	Sochaux	1–2	Paris Saint-Germain	Montbéliard
20:50	N'Daw 74'		Diané 23', 83'	Stadium: Stade Auguste-Bonal; Attendance: 19,873; Referee: Bertrand Layec

=== Coupe de France ===
Ligue 1 Paris Saint-Germain kick-started the New Year on a winning note in the French Cup. PSG, who have won the French Cup on seven occasions, got first-half goals from Clément Chantôme and Sylvain Armand for their victory over fourth division Épinal. Paris Saint Germain ended the French Cup dreams of fifth division Le Poiré-sur-Vie. Striker Amara Diané netted twice as PSG shrug off poor form to reach last-16. Paris Saint-Germain reached the quarter-finals of the French Cup thanks to two-goal hero Loris Arnaud, who found the net twice in a win over Bastia. After their victory over Marseille in the previous round, Carquefou, from the French fifth grade, had the chance of another huge upset in the quarter-final, where they faced PSG. Carquefou's French Cup dream finally ended when Pauleta earned PSG a narrow win over the amateur outfit in the eagerly-awaited quarter-final clash between the sides at the Stade de la Beaujoire. Yannick Boli scored 12 minutes from time to give Paul Le Guen's PSG a narrow win over Ligue 2 side Amiens in the semi-final to claim their place in the French Cup final at the Stade de France. Sidney Govou's extra-time winner gave Ligue 1 champions Lyon a narrow victory over PSG. Paul Le Guen's capital side dominated for long periods but it was Alain Perrin's men who lifted the trophy.

==== Matches ====
5 January 2008 Round of 64	Épinal	0–2	Paris Saint-Germain	Épinal
21:00	Gonçalvès (red card) 23'		Chantôme 23'; Mendy (yellow card) 25'; Armand 30'; Ngog (yellow card) 35'; Bourillon (yellow card) 45+1'; Digard (yellow card) 54'	Stadium: Stade de la Colombière; Attendance: 6,098; Referee: Stéphane Moulin

2 February 2008 Round of 32	Le Poiré-sur-Vie	1–3	Paris Saint-Germain	Nantes
18:00	Pallier 54'		Mendy 52'; Diané 74', 76'	Stadium: Stade de la Beaujoire; Attendance: 28,114; Referee: Olivier Thual

18 March 2008 Round of 16	Paris Saint-Germain	2–1	Bastia	Paris
18:00	Arnaud 18', 66'		Jau (yellow card) 2'; André 27'; Méniri (yellow card) 63'; Cahuzac (yellow card) 73'	Stadium: Parc des Princes; Attendance: 15,000; Referee: Tony Chapron

16 April 2008 Quarter-finals	Carquefou	0–1	Paris Saint-Germain	Nantes
21:00	Zebidi (yellow card) 87'; Sehla (yellow card) 90+2'		Mabiala (yellow card) 64'; Pauleta 77'; Chantôme (yellow card) 90+2'	Stadium: Stade de la Beaujoire; Attendance: 36,045; Referee: Olivier Thual

6 May 2008 Semi-finals	Amiens	0–1	Paris Saint-Germain	Amiens
20:45	Hamed (yellow card) 75'		Yepes (yellow card) 45'; Boli 78'	Stadium: Stade de la Licorne; Attendance: 11,937; Referee: Tony Chapron

24 May 2008 Final	Lyon	1–0 (a.e.t.)	Paris Saint-Germain	Paris
21:00	Réveillère (yellow card) 41'; Squillaci (yellow card) 45+2'; Govou 103'; Keita (yellow card) 110'		Camara (yellow card) 40'; Rothen (yellow card) 65'; Mendy (yellow card) 112'	Stadium: Stade de France; Attendance: 79,204; Referee: Philippe Kalt

=== Coupe de la Ligue ===
Paris Saint-Germain cruised past Lorient and reached the last-16 of the League Cup. Young starlet David Ngog scored his first two goals for PSG, while Pauleta pounced late on to seal the victory. Paris Saint-Germain at last treated their supporters to a home win when they defeated second division Montpellier. PSG goalkeeper Mickaël Landreau saved a Grégory Lacombe penalty in the 77th minute. PSG avoided a potential giant-killing at the hands of Montpellier as Pauleta moved level with former stalwart Dominique Rocheteau. The Portuguese hitman became the club's joint-highest goalscorer with goals 99 and 100. PSG met Valenciennes in the next round who made history by qualifying to the League Cup quarter-finals for the first time in the club's history. Ten-man PSG reached the League Cup semi-finals after smashing Valenciennes at the Parc des Princes. The capital club made it two successive home wins in a row as Amara Diané struck twice to ensure VA could not find a way past a spirited and free-scoring PSG side in their League Cup quarter final. PSG were drawn for home advantage in the League Cup semi-finals as they hosted Auxerre. Paris Saint-Germain booked a place in the League Cup final with a win over Auxerre at the Parc des Princes. PSG qualified for their fourth League Cup final in 14 years and reached their 13th domestic final. Goals from Mario Yepes, Pauleta and Bernard Mendy ensured a place in the final after AJA could only manage a late Julien Quercia effort and a helping hand from PSG goalkeeper Mickaël Landreau. The capital side faced RC Lens at the Stade de France and looked forward to a first domestic cup final since 2006 when they beat bitter rivals Marseille in the French Cup final. Pauleta scored the opening goal as PSG clinched a dramatic injury-time victory over Lens to become the only club to ever win the Coupe de la Ligue three times. Substitute Bernard Mendy struck the historic goal on a fabulous night of action when he rolled the ball home from the penalty spot in the 94th minute after Lens captain Hilton had hauled down substitute striker Péguy Luyindula in the box.

==== Matches ====
26 September 2007 Round of 32	Lorient	0–3	Paris Saint-Germain	Lorient
21:00	Abriel (yellow card) 69'		Ngog 22', 43'; Rothen (yellow card) 44'; Pauleta 85'	Stadium: Stade du Moustoir; Attendance: 8,189; Referee: Damien Ledentu

31 October 2007 Round of 16	Paris Saint-Germain	2–0	Montpellier	Paris
19:00	Pauleta 6', 90+3'; Mendy (yellow card) 45'; Clément (yellow card) 83'		N'Gambi (red card) 90+3'	Stadium: Parc des Princes; Attendance: 24,097; Referee: Stéphane Lannoy

16 January 2008 Quarter-finals	Paris Saint-Germain	4–0	Valenciennes	Paris
17:00	Pauleta 1' (pen.) (yellow card) 29'; Yepes (red card) 6'; Diané 54', 61'; Rothen 67'		Rippert (yellow card) 9'	Stadium: Parc des Princes; Attendance: 18,771; Referee: Jean-Charles Cailleux

26 February 2008 Semi-finals	Paris Saint-Germain	3–2	Auxerre	Paris
21:00	Yepes 31'; Pauleta 43'; Mendy 79'		Pedretti (yellow card) 50'; Landreau 75' (o.g.); Quercia 90+3'	Stadium: Parc des Princes; Attendance: 32,198; Referee: Éric Poulat

29 March 2008 Final	Lens	1–2	Paris Saint-Germain	Paris
21:00	Laurenti (yellow card) 36'; Carrière 51'; Hilton (yellow card) 90+3'		Pauleta 19'; Chantôme (yellow card) 55'; Mendy 90+3' (pen.)	Stadium: Stade de France; Attendance: 78,741; Referee: Laurent Duhamel

== Start formations ==
Qnt	Formation	Match(es)
24	4-4-2	L1 (15), UEL (6), TC (1), CL (2)

Source: PSG.fr
Only competitive matches.

Starting XI

No.	Pos.	Nat.	Name	MS	Notes
1	GK	(France)	Grégory Coupet		
26	RB	(France)	Christophe Jallet		
6	CB	(France)	Zoumana Camara		
3	CB	(France)	Mamadou Sakho		
22	LB	(France)	Sylvain Armand		
19	LM	(Brazil)	Nenê		
4	DM	(France)	Claude Makélélé		
12	CM	(France)	Mathieu Bodmer		
7	AM	(France)	Ludovic Giuly		
11	FW	(Ivory Coast)	Amara Diané		
9	FW	(France)	Guillaume Hoarau		

Source: Squad stats and Start formations.
Only competitive matches.
Using the most used start formation.
Ordered by position on pitch (from back right to front left).

== Appearances and goals ==
No.	Pos	Nat	Player	Total		Ligue 1		Coupe de la Ligue		Coupe de France	
No.	Pos	Nat	Player	Apps	Goals	Apps	Goals	Apps	Goals	Apps	Goals
1	GK	(France) FRA	Grégory Coupet	17	0	16	0	1	0	0	0
16	GK	(France) FRA	Willy Grondin	1	0	0	0	0	0	1	0
30	GK	(Armenia) ARM	Apoula Edel	30	0	23	0	1	0	6	0
2	DF	(Brazil) BRA	Ceará	35	0	29	0	2	0	4	0
3	DF	(France) FRA	Mamadou Sakho	39	0	32	0	2	0	5	0
13	DF	(Mali) MLI	Sammy Traoré	26	0	23	0	1	0	2	0
15	DF	(France) FRA	Zoumana Camara	30	0	23	0	1	0	6	0
22	DF	(France) FRA	Sylvain Armand	38	2	33	2	0	0	5	0
26	MF	(France) FRA	Christophe Jallet	43	3	35	3	2	0	6	0
4	MF	(France) FRA	Claude Makélélé	36	1	31	1	0	0	5	0
10	MF	(Benin) BEN	Stéphane Sessègnon	33	3	29	3	0	0	4	0
17	MF	(France) FRA	Granddi Ngoyi	20	0	16	0	2	0	2	0
20	MF	(France) FRA	Clément Chantôme	30	3	24	2	2	0	4	1
23	MF	(France) FRA	Jérémy Clément	41	3	34	3	1	0	6	0
24	MF	(France) FRA	Tripy Makonda	2	0	1	0	1	0	0	0
27	MF	(France) FRA	Younousse Sankharé	26	1	22	1	2	0	2	0
7	FW	(France) FRA	Ludovic Giuly	38	4	31	3	1	0	6	1
8	FW	(France) FRA	Péguy Luyindula	31	8	28	6	1	0	2	2
9	FW	(France) FRA	Guillaume Hoarau	28	8	22	6	1	0	5	2
11	FW	(Ivory Coast) CIV	Amara Diané	25	11	25	11	0	0	0	0
14	FW	(Serbia) SRB	Mateja Kežman	15	2	13	2	0	0	2	0
21	FW	(France) FRA	Jean-Eudes Maurice	28	3	23	1	2	1	3	1

== Other statistics ==
No.	Pos.	Nat.	Player	Assists	Minutes Played	Yellow card	Yellow card Red card	Red card
1	GK	(France)	Grégory Coupet	0	750	0	0	0
16	GK	(France)	Alphonse Areola	0	0	0	0	0
30	GK	(Armenia)	Apoula Edel	0	1440	0	0	0
2	DF	(Brazil)	Ceará	0	847	1	0	0
3	DF	(France)	Mamadou Sakho	0	1788	4	0	0
5	DF	(Ivory Coast)	Siaka Tiéné	1	1343	6	0	0
6	DF	(France)	Zoumana Camara	0	1123	1	0	0
13	DF	(Mali)	Sammy Traoré	0	0	0	0	0
22	DF	(France)	Sylvain Armand	1	1573	3	0	0
26	DF	(France)	Christophe Jallet	0	1936	2	0	0
4	MF	(France)	Claude Makélélé	0	1436	3	0	0
10	MF	(Benin)	Stéphane Sessègnon	1	1036	1	0	0
12	MF	(France)	Mathieu Bodmer	1	856	4	0	0
19	MF	(Brazil)	Nenê	2	1695	2	0	0
20	MF	(France)	Clément Chantôme	0	1398	5	0	0
23	MF	(France)	Jérémy Clément	0	869	3	0	1
24	MF	(France)	Tripy Makonda	0	269	2	0	0
31	MF	(Mali)	Adama Touré	0	0	0	0	0
7	FW	(France)	Ludovic Giuly	4	1180	2	0	0
8	FW	(France)	Péguy Luyindula	1	1145	1	0	0
9	FW	(France)	Guillaume Hoarau	2	1610	1	0	0
11	FW	(Ivory Coast)	Amara Diané	1	2511	3	0	0
14	FW	(Serbia)	Mateja Kežman	0	50	1	0	0
21	FW	(France)	Jean-Eudes Maurice	0	227	0	0	0

Source: Ligue 1
Only competitive matches
(yellow card) = Number of bookings; (second yellow card) = Number of sending offs after a second yellow card; (red card) = Number of sending offs by a direct red card.
