= Clément Chantôme =

French footballer (born 1987)

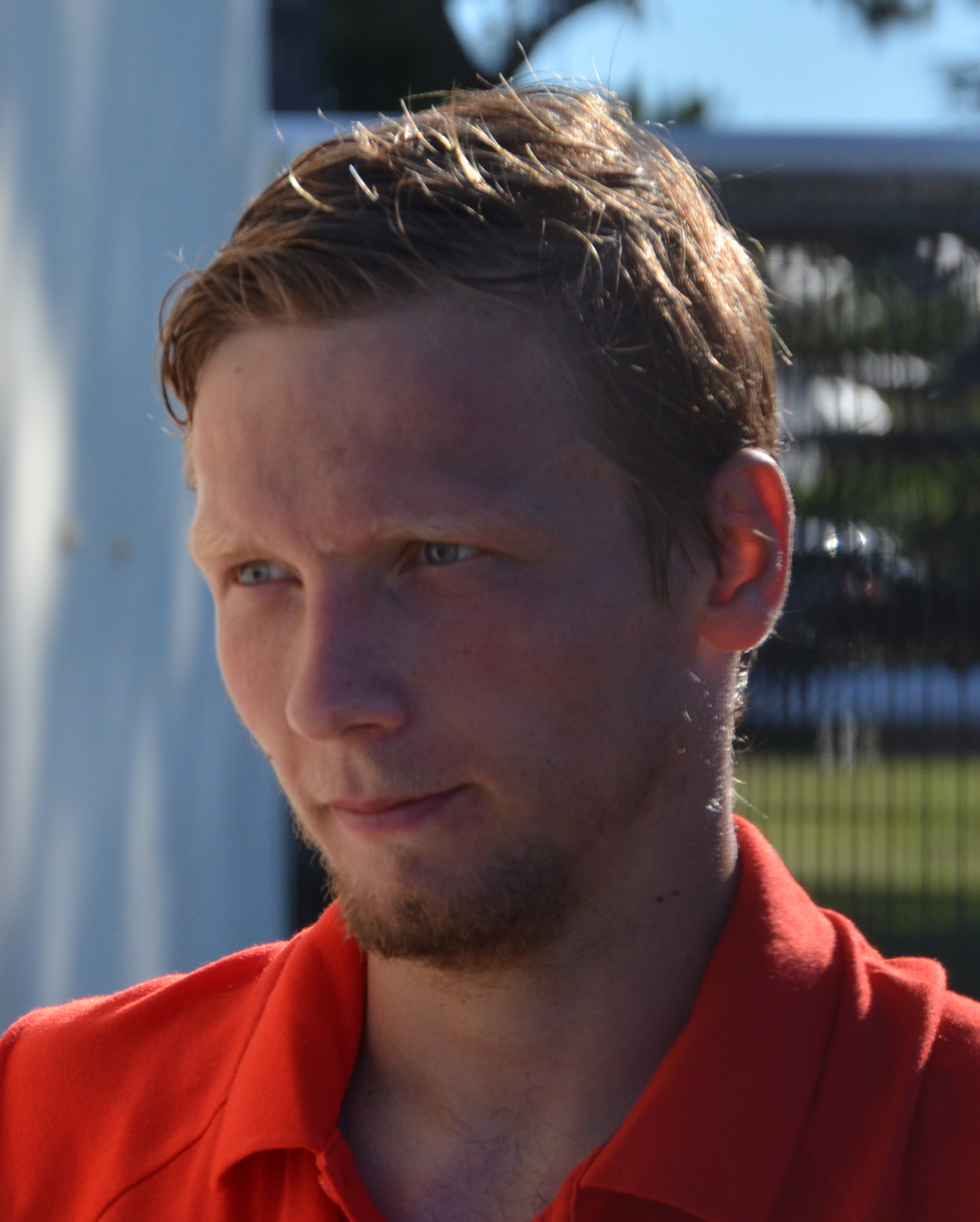
- Chantôme with Rennes in 2016

Personal information
- Full name: Clément Jean Robert Chantôme
- Date of birth: 11 September 1987 (age 39)
- Place of birth: Sens, Yonne, France
- Height: 1.80 m (5 ft 11 in)
- Position: Central midfielder

Team information
- Current team: C'Chartres

Youth career
- 1993–1998: Savigny-le-Temple
- 1998–2000: Le Mée Sports
- 2000–2006: Paris Saint-Germain

Senior career*
Years	Team	Apps	(Gls)
2006–2015	Paris Saint-Germain	168	(5)
2013–2014	→ Toulouse (loan)	27	(2)
2011	Paris Saint-Germain B	1	(0)
2015–2016	Bordeaux	39	(1)
2016–2018	Rennes	7	(0)
2017–2018	→ Lens (loan)	20	(1)
2017	Rennes B	1	(0)
2018–2019	Red Star	16	(0)
2020–2022	Poissy	21	(0)
2022–	C'Chartres	32	(2)

International career
2006–2008	France U21	7	(0)
2012	France	1	(0)
- * Club domestic league appearances and goals as of 22:19, 31 August 2023 (UTC)

Clément Jean Robert Chantôme (born 11 September 1987) is a French professional footballer who plays as a central midfielder for Championnat National 1 club C'Chartres.

Following his graduation from the Paris Saint-Germain Academy, Chantôme made a name for himself as a technically gifted, ball-winning box-to-box midfielder. A fan-favourite at Paris Saint-Germain (PSG), he was noted among supporters for his home-grown status, love for the Parisian shirt, and subtle hard work. With PSG, Chântome won two Ligue 1, two Coupe de France, two Coupe de la Ligue, and one Trophée des Champions titles. He played for the club's first team from 2006 to 2015, including a loan out to Toulouse in the 2013–14 season. After leaving Paris, Chantôme went on to play for Bordeaux. He signed for Rennes in 2016, and was loaned to Lens a year later. In 2018, he transferred to Red Star, followed by Poissy in 2020 and C'Chartres in 2022.

Chantôme was a France youth international; he played for the under-21s from 2006 to 2008. In 2012, he made an appearance for the France national team in a friendly against Japan.

== Club career ==
=== Paris Saint-Germain ===
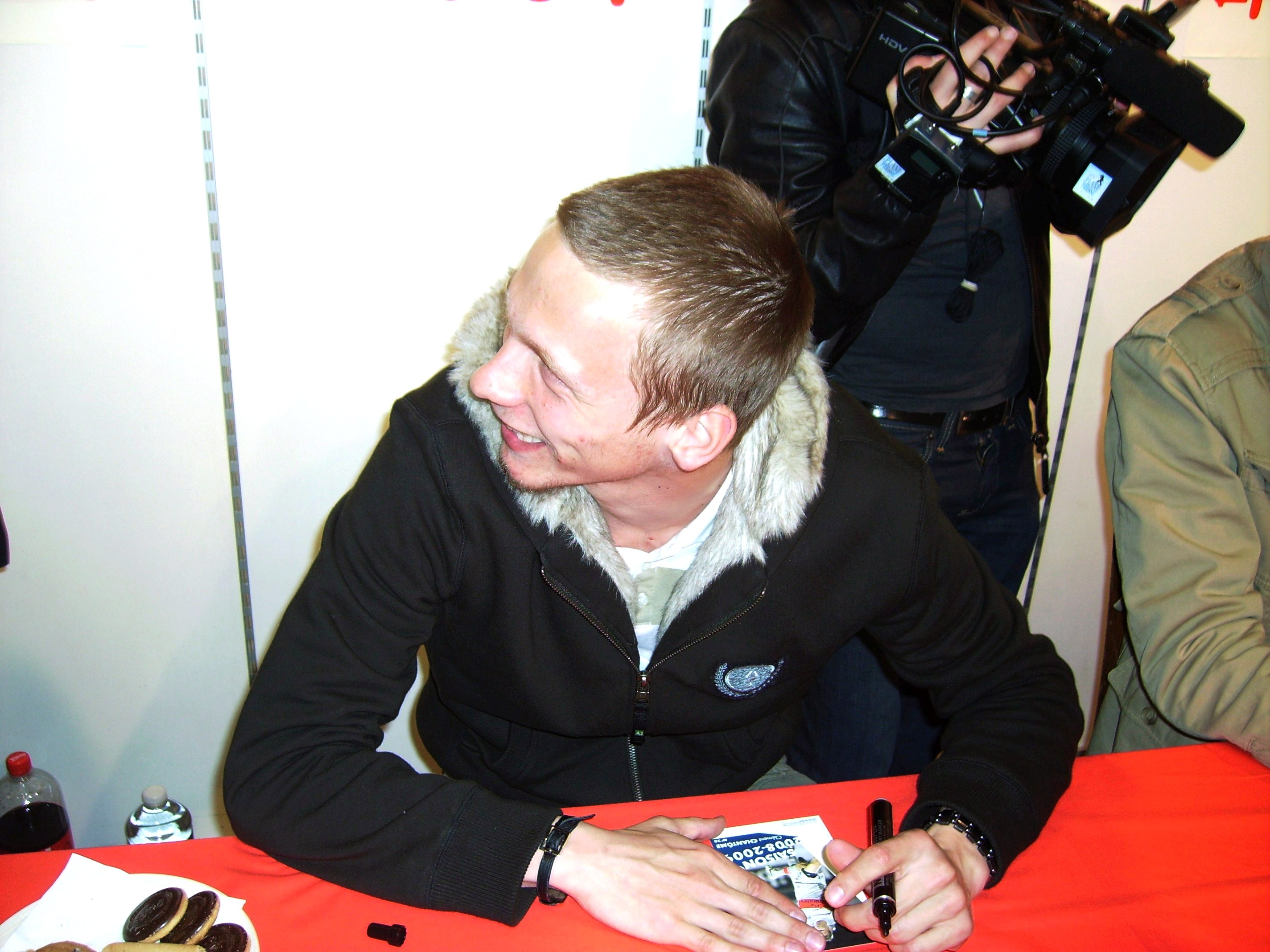
Chantôme signing autographs for Paris Saint-Germain in 2009

Born in Sens, Yonne, Chantôme played football in his youth at Savigny-le-Temple and Le Mée Sports before joining Paris Saint-Germain (PSG) in 2000.

==== 2006–07 season ====
After rising through the ranks of the academy, he was promoted to the club's first team for the 2006–07 season, and signed his first professional contract with the side. A technically blessed, ball-winning box-to-box midfielder, Chantôme made his debut for Paris Saint-Germain as a 75th-minute substitute against Lyon in the Trophée des Champions, which the club lost 5–4 in a penalty shootout following a 1–1 draw in 120 minutes of play. He made his league debut for the club as an 83rd-minute substitute in a 1–0 win against Valenciennes on 12 August 2006. A month later on 14 September 2006, Chantôme made his European debut in the first leg of the UEFA Cup first round against Derry City, coming on as an 84th-minute substitute in a 0–0 draw. Since then, he became a first-team regular for Paris Saint-Germain, starting in the midfield position. As the season progressed, the club finished fifteenth place in the league, having narrowly avoided relegation. By the end of the 2006–07 season, Chantôme had made thirty-three appearances in all competitions.

==== 2007–08 season ====
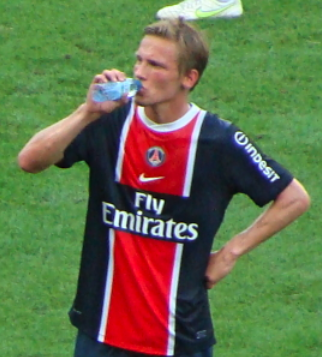
Chantôme while playing for Paris Saint-Germain in 2011

Chantôme appeared in the first team during the first two months of the 2007–08 season, but was subsequently dropped. On 1 December 2007, he returned to the first team, coming on as a 78th-minute substitute in a 1–0 loss to Caen. Following his return, Chantôme soon regained his place in the side.

On 5 January 2008, Chantôme scored his first-ever goal for Paris Saint-Germain in a 2–0 win against Épinal in the first round of the Coupe de France. He then started in the Coupe de la Ligue Final against Lens, playing 64 minutes before being substituted, in a 2–1 win, earning his first trophy in his professional career. He made three assists in the last four matches of the 2007–08 season. Chantôme started in the Coupe de France Final against Lyon, playing 83 minutes before being substituted, in a 1–0 loss. Despite being sidelined on three occasions later in the 2007–08 season, he made thirty-six appearances and scored once in all competitions.

==== 2008–09 season ====
On 10 August 2008, it was announced that Chantôme had signed a contract extension with Paris Saint-Germain, keeping him at the club until 2011. After the club signed Claude Makélélé, Chantôme lost his position in the starting lineup, often appearing as a substitute. Injuries, including one to his thigh, contributed to his non-appearances in the team. At one point, Chantôme was expected to be loaned out so he could play first-team football elsewhere, but he ended up staying at the club. Chantôme scored his first goal of the season on 23 October 2008, in a 3–1 loss against Schalke 04 in a UEFA Cup match. He then contributed two assists in both legs, winning 5–1 win against Wolfsburg. In the 2008–09 season, Chantôme made thirty-six appearances and scored once in all competitions.

==== 2009–10 season ====
In the 2009–10 season, Chantôme continued to play largely as a substitute due to strong competitions in the midfield position. He also faced an injury concern that caused him to be sidelined on three occasions during the season. His first goal of the season came on 1 November 2009 in a 4–1 win against Sochaux. He later scored two more goals in the next two months against Boulogne and Aubervilliers. Chantôme said in an interview in April that he was frustrated at not playing on the first team at Paris Saint-Germain. He appeared as an unused substitute as the club won the Coupe de France Final by beating Monaco 1–0. He made thirty appearances and scored three times in all competitions over the 2009–10 season.

==== 2010–11 season ====
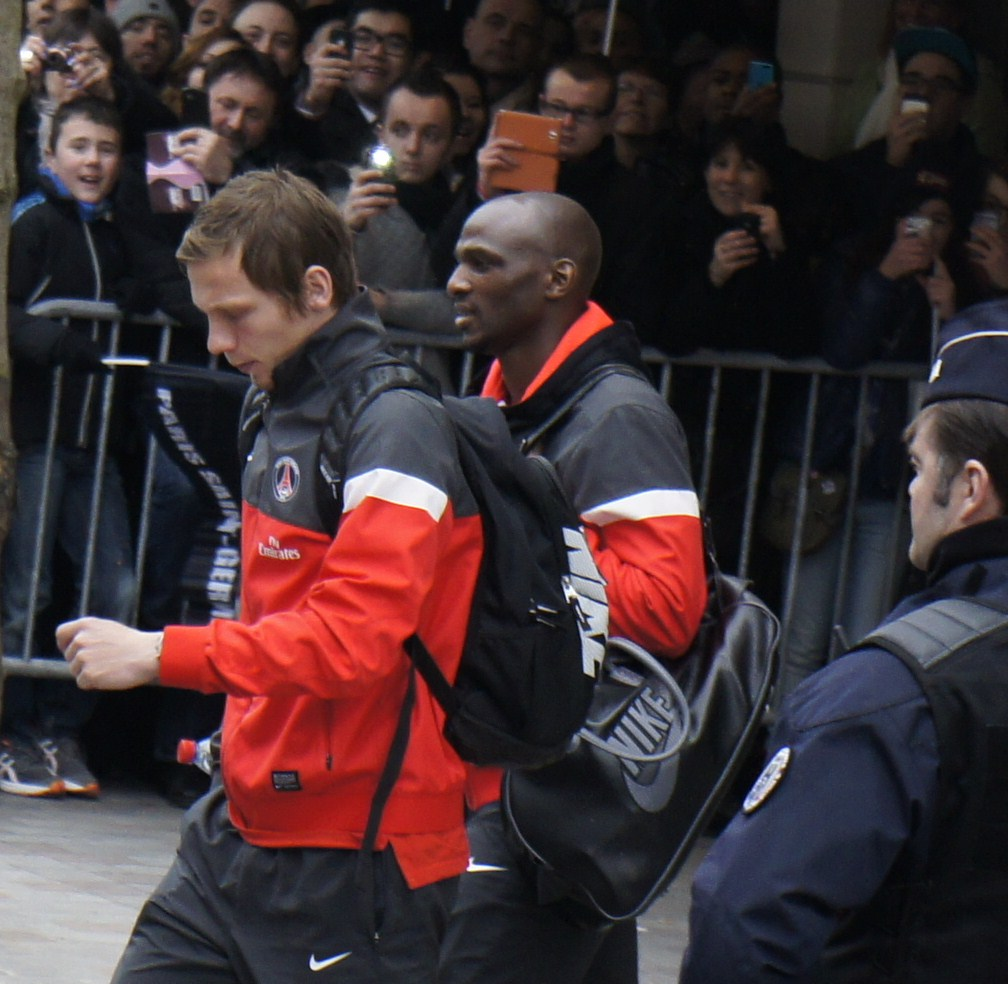
Chantôme and Zoumana Camara leaving their hotel before a match for Paris Saint-Germain

Despite renewed speculation about a move, Chantôme remained with Paris Saint-Germain for the 2010–11 season. Chantôme played in both legs of the UEFA Europa League play-off round against Maccabi Tel Aviv, as Paris Saint-Germain won 5–4 on aggregate. Having started out on the substitute bench, he soon regained a place on the first team as a defensive midfielder. On 21 October 2010, Chantôme scored an equalising goal in the 87th minute of a 1–1 draw against Borussia Dortmund, having come on as a substitute five minutes before. This was followed by assisting a goal for Nenê in a 3–2 loss against Auxerre. His performance later earned him the Player of the Month for November and Team of the Year awards in the first half of the season by Le Figaro. In the semi–finals of the Coupe de la Ligue against Montpellier, he was sent off for a second bookable offence and served a two-match suspension as a result. He did not return to the starting line-up until 5 February 2011, in a match against Rennes that Paris Saint-Germain lost 1–0. On 20 March, he scored his second goal of the season, in a 2–1 loss against Marseille. Three weeks later, on 9 April, Chantôme scored his third goal of the season, in a 2–1 win against SM Caen. On 21 April, he signed a contract extension with the club, keeping him until 2015. Chantôme then started in the Coupe de France Final against Lille, as Paris Saint-Germain lost 1–0. Despite being sidelined on five occasions later in the 2010–11 season, he went on to make forty-three appearances and scored three times in all competitions.

==== 2011–12 season ====
At the start of the 2011–12 season, Chantôme became a first-team regular for Paris Saint-Germain, playing in the defensive midfield position, despite the club coming under new ownership. He was sent off in a 0–0 draw against Slovan Bratislava on 20 October 2011. Despite this, Chantôme was able to set up two goals in two matches between 16 October and 23 October against Ajaccio and Dijon. However, he suffered a muscular problem that kept him out for the rest of the year. Chantôme returned to the first team on 14 January 2012, coming on as an 85th-minute substitute, in a 3–1 win against Toulouse. Following his return, his first-team appearances were restricted due to injuries and competition with other players. As a result, he only made three starts for Paris Saint-Germain. Over the course of the whole season, he made twenty-one appearances in all competitions.

==== 2012–13 season ====
Chantôme considered a move to Lille or Lyon ahead of the 2012–13 season, but when Lille proved uninterested and manager Carlo Ancelotti expressed his desire for Chantôme to remain at Paris Saint-Germain, he decided to stay. Thanks to his home-grown status, love for the Parisian shirt, and subtle hard work, he became a fan favourite at PSG. Chantôme started in the first two matches of the season before suffering a hip injury that sidelined him from August until 14 September 2012. He made his UEFA Champions League debut against Dynamo Kyiv and set up Paris Saint-Germain's third goal of the game in a 4–1 win. Despite his involvement in the first team, Chantôme found himself sidelined on three occasions in the first half of the season, and by December he was mostly playing as a substitute. Chantôme set up Paris Saint-Germain's first goal of the game in a 2–0 win against Rennes on 6 April 2013. After suffering a muscle injury that saw him miss one match, he scored on his return from injury, in a 3–0 win against Nice on 21 April. Chantôme came on a late substitute against Lyon on 12 May, winning 1–0, as the club won the league at home, marking the club's third-ever national championship. By the end of the season, he had made thirty-eight appearances, including twenty starts, and scored once in all competitions.

==== 2013–14: Loan to Toulouse ====
On 21 August 2013, it was announced that Chantôme would join Toulouse on loan for the season. He was assigned the number 6 shirt.

Chantôme made his debut for Toulouse in a 0–0 draw against Monaco two days later, starting and playing the whole game. He quickly became a first-team regular for the club as a midfielder. Chantôme played against his parent club in a 2–0 loss on 28 September. He then suffered a knee injury that kept him out for a month. He returned to the first team as an 82nd-minute substitute in a 2–2 draw against Marseille on 2 February 2014. A week later against Bastia on 11 February 2014, however, he was sent off for a second bookable offense, as the club lost 3–1. After serving a one-match suspension, he returned to the first team, once again starting against his parent club in a 4–2 defeat on 23 February. Chantôme then set up two goals for the club against Reims, as Toulouse won 3–2 on 8 March. This was followed up by scoring against Rennes and Ajaccio two weeks later. Despite being plagued by further injuries, he went on to make twenty-eight appearances and scored twice in all competitions. Following this, Chantôme returned to his parent club.

==== 2014–15: Return to Paris Saint-Germain ====
After the end of his loan spell at Toulouse, Chantôme made his first appearance of the 2014–15 season for Paris Saint-Germain, coming on as a 71st-minute substitute in a 2–0 win against Guingamp in the Trophée des Champions. In August, his future was uncertain, as many clubs, including Toulouse, were interested in signing him, but he ultimately stayed with the club. However, his first-team opportunities became limited once again at Paris Saint-Germain, and he was often on the substitute bench. As a result, he was restricted to twelve appearances for the club this season. This led to further speculation over his future at Paris Saint-Germain when the transfer window opened in January. Amid the transfer speculation, he made his last appearance for the club on 5 January 2015, in a 3–0 win against Montpellier in the first round of the Coupe de France.

=== Bordeaux ===
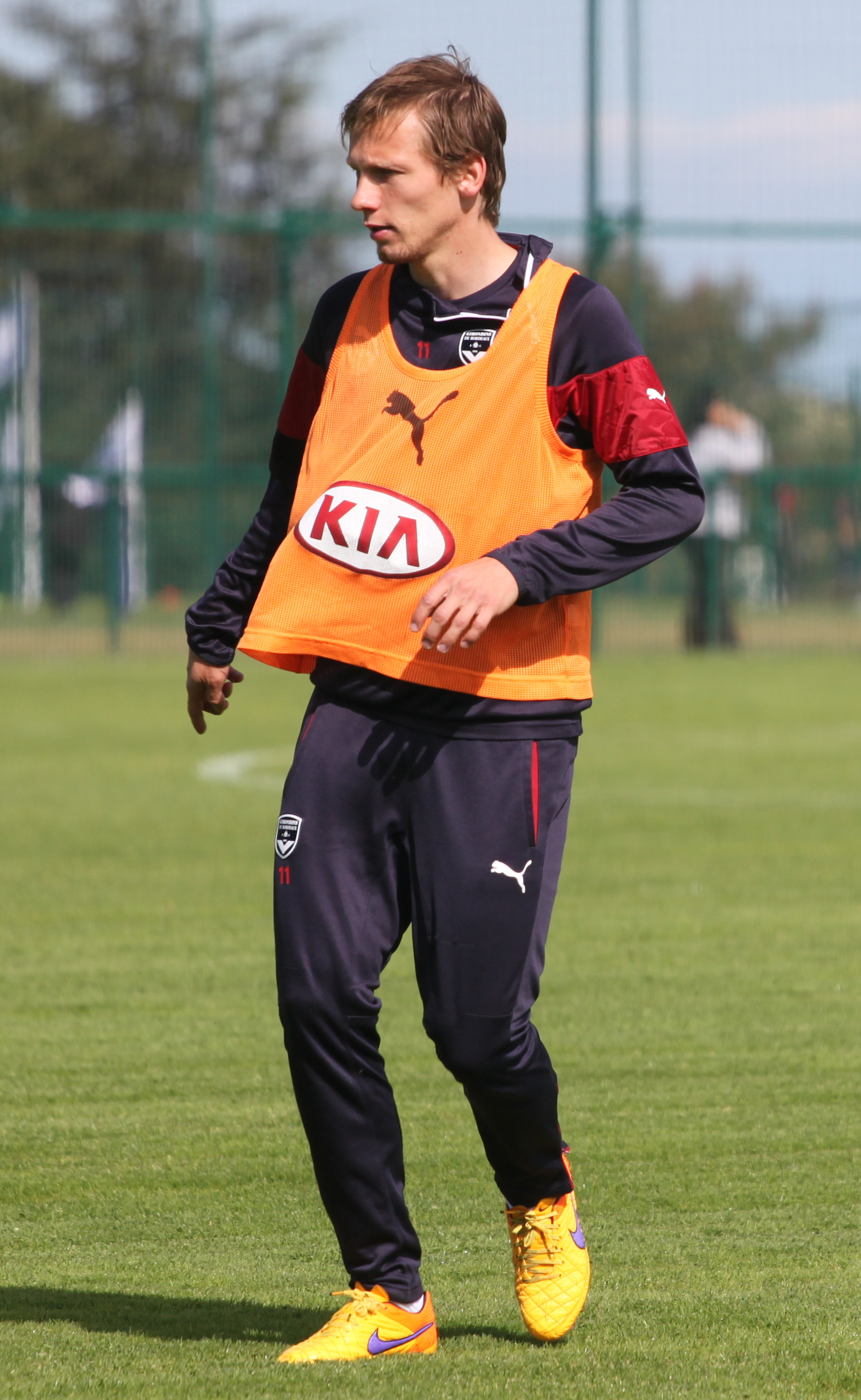
Chantôme training for Bordeaux in 2015

In January 2015, Chantôme left Paris, after 15 years with the club, to sign an 18-month contract with Bordeaux. He made his debut for the club as a starter against Guingamp on 1 February 2015 and set up the equalising goal in a 1–1 draw. This was followed up by setting up another goal in a 1–0 win against Evian. Despite being sidelined on two occasions later in the 2014–15 season, Chantôme remained a regular on the first team in the midfield position. He went on to make thirteen appearances in all competitions.

At the start of the 2015–16 season, Chantôme played in both legs of the UEFA Europa League third-round match against AEK Larnaca, in which he set up one of the goals, but he was sent off in the return leg. Bordeaux won 4–0 on aggregate. Chantôme also played in the centre–back position on two occasions. He found himself sidelined throughout the first half of the season, and he did not score his first goal until 26 January 2016, in a 5–1 loss against Lille in the semi–finals of the Coupe de la Ligue. Three weeks later, on 13 February, he scored his second goal of the season in a 4–2 win against Guingamp. After the match, Chantôme was named to Le Figaro's Team of the Week. He then captained Bordeaux for the first time in his career, as the club lost 4–0 on 12 March. Chantôme suffered an abdominal injury while training and missed four matches, returning as a 65th-minute substitute in a 4–2 win against Troyes on 29 April. Chantôme then appeared in the next two matches before suffering a shoulder injury that forced him to miss the last game of the season. He made thirty-five appearances and scored twice in all competitions during the season.

With his contract expiring at the end of the 2015–16 season, Chantôme announced his intention to leave the club.

=== Rennes ===
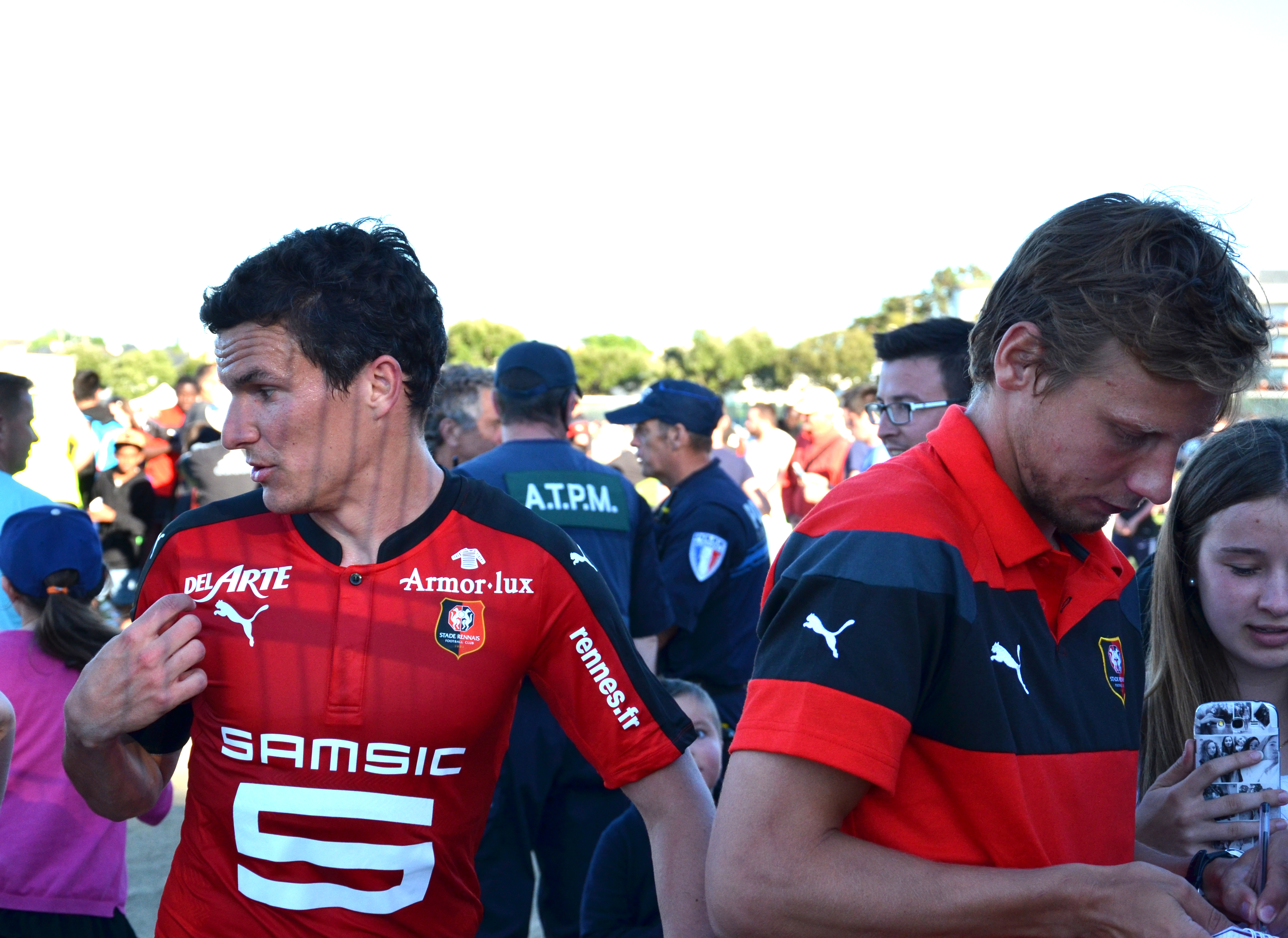
Chantôme pictured with Romain Danzé signing autographs before a match between Rennes and USM Alger in 2016

In June 2016, after a difficult season with Bordeaux, Chantôme signed a three-year deal with Rennes.

He made his debut for the club as a starter against Nice in the opening game of the season, but was substituted off in the 24th minute due to a shoulder injury. On 9 September it was announced that Chantôme would be sidelined for two months in order to recover from his injury. In mid-January, he returned to the first team, appearing in the next three matches as an unused substitute. He made his return to the starting line-up against Angers on 8 February 2017, and helped Rennes draw 0–0. However, his return was short-lived, as he soon suffered a hip injury that kept him out for a month. He returned to the starting line-up against Lyon on 2 April and played 59 minutes before being substituted, in a 1–1 draw. He then appeared in the next two matches before being dropped from the squad for the rest of the season.

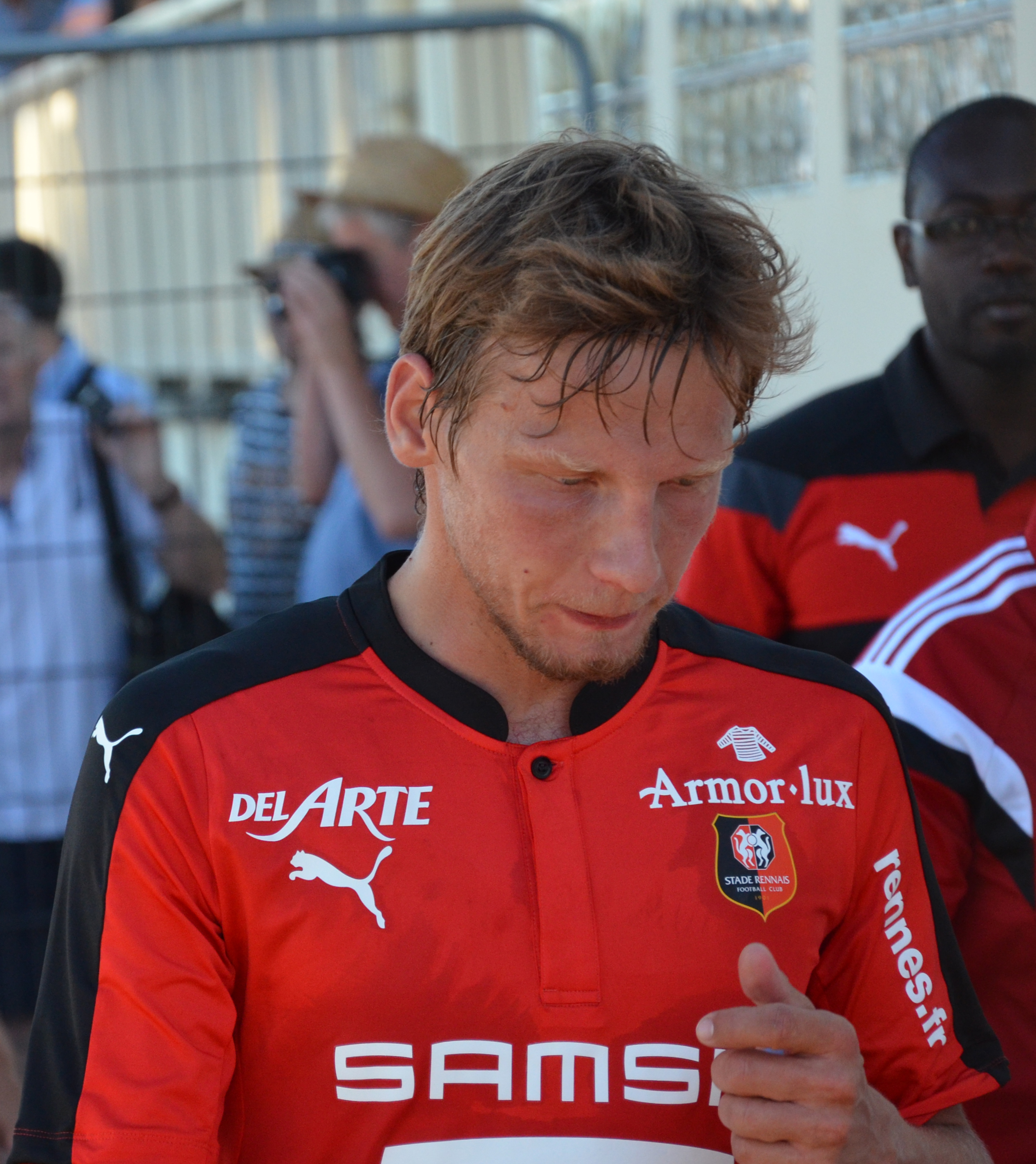
Chantôme before a friendly match between Rennes and USM Alger in 2016

==== Loan to Lens ====
In the summer of 2017, Chantôme was rumoured to be considering a move away from Rennes, having been told by manager Christian Gourcuff that he could leave the club. Strasbourg and Ligue 2 side Lens were reportedly interested in signing him. It was announced on 8 August that Chantôme would join Lens on loan for the 2017–18 season.

He debuted for the club as a 60th-minute substitute in a 3–2 loss against Lorient in the second round of the Coupe de la Ligue. Chantôme then made his first start for Lens in a 2–0 loss against Orléans on 28 August. Shortly after, he suffered an injury while training and was sidelined for a month, returning on 30 October for a 0–0 draw against Châteauroux. He then captained the club in a 1–0 loss against Le Havre on 25 November. After recovering from an injury, Chantôme regained his first team place, playing in the midfield position and serving as captain in a number of matches for Lens. He scored his first goal for the club on 19 February 2018 in a 2–1 win against Quevilly-Rouen. Following the 2017–18 season, in which he made twenty-three appearances and scored once in all competitions, Chantôme returned to his parent club.

On 30 August 2018, Chantôme agreed to terminate his contract with Rennes.

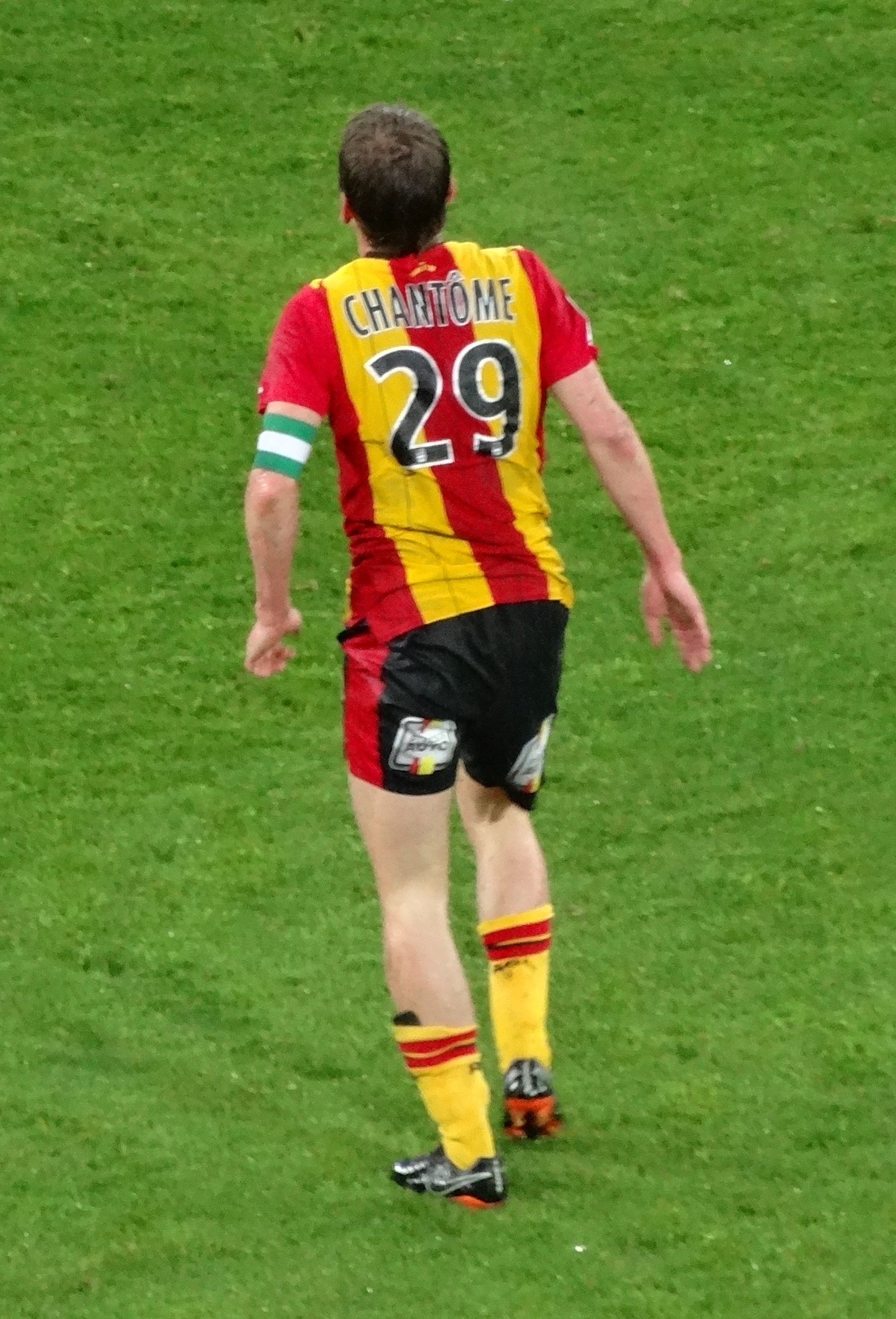
Chantôme playing for Lens in 2018

=== Red Star ===
Eight days later, after leaving Rennes, Chantôme joined Red Star on a three-year deal. He reportedly accepted a monthly salary of €20,000, the highest of Red Star's squad, after earning about €100,000 a month at Rennes. Chantôme revealed that he turned down a move abroad in order to join Red Star.

On 28 September 2018, Chantôme made his debut for the club, starting the whole game, in a 3–2 loss against Grenoble. However, he was sidelined for most of the season due to suspensions and injury. Chantôme was sent off on three occasions for Red Star; first against Brest on 2 November, then against Caen on 5 January 2019 and against Valenciennes on 22 February. Chantôme made seventeen appearances in the 2018–19 season, which saw the club relegated to Championnat National. Following this, Chantôme was released by Red Star, after the team had previously released him in March but reversed their decision. During this time, Chantôme became an occasional columnist for L'Équipe.

=== Poissy ===
It was announced on 8 January 2020 that Chantôme joined Poissy for the 2019–20 season. It was later revealed that he was on an amateur contract with the club.

Chantôme made his debut for Poissy, playing the whole game, in a 2–2 draw against Entente SSG on 25 January. He went on to make four more appearances before the season was suspended indefinitely on 12 March due to the COVID-19 pandemic. The following season, he would only make four appearances; the season was once again ended early due to COVID-19. During the 2021–22 season, Chantôme made twelve league appearances for Poissy.

=== C'Chartres ===
On 16 January 2022, Chantôme officially joined Championnat National 2 side C'Chartres. He made his debut for the club in a 1–0 league win over Romorantin on 22 January.

== International career ==
In November 2006, Chantôme was called up to the France U21 squad for the first time. He made his U21 debut for the national side, starting the whole game, in a 4–2 win against the Sweden U21s on 14 November 2006. Chantôme went on to make six appearances for the U21 side.

Chantôme earned his only cap for the senior national team in a 1–0 friendly loss against Japan on 12 October 2012. He came on as a substitute for Blaise Matuidi in the 46th minute of the game, but was replaced by Bafétimbi Gomis after 30 minutes. Following this, Chantôme left the squad due to a hamstring injury during the match against Japan and was never called up to the France national team again.

== Career statistics ==
=== Club ===
As of match played 6 May 2023

Appearances and goals by club, season and competition
Club	Season	League			National cup		League cup		Continental		Other		Total	
Club	Season	Division	Apps	Goals	Apps	Goals	Apps	Goals	Apps	Goals	Apps	Goals	Apps	Goals
Paris Saint-Germain	2006–07	Ligue 1	20	0	3	0	2	0	7 (Note: Appearances in the UEFA Cup/UEFA Europa League)	0	1 (Note: Appearance in the Trophée des Champions)	0	33	0
Paris Saint-Germain	2007–08	Ligue 1	28	0	5	1	3	0	—		—		36	1
Paris Saint-Germain	2008–09	Ligue 1	21	0	2	0	3	0	9	1	—		35	1
Paris Saint-Germain	2009–10	Ligue 1	24	2	4	1	2	0	—		—		30	3
Paris Saint-Germain	2010–11	Ligue 1	26	2	4	0	3	0	11	1	0	0	44	3
Paris Saint-Germain	2011–12	Ligue 1	15	0	2	0	0	0	4	0	—		21	0
Paris Saint-Germain	2012–13	Ligue 1	28	1	3	0	1	0	6 (Note: Appearances in the UEFA Champions League)	0	—		38	1
Paris Saint-Germain	2014–15	Ligue 1	6	0	1	1	1	0	3	0	1	0	12	1
Paris Saint-Germain	Total		168	5	24	3	15	0	40	2	2	0	249	10
Paris Saint-Germain B	2011–12	CFA	1	0	—		—		—		—		1	0
Toulouse (loan)	2013–14	Ligue 1	27	2	0	0	1	0	—		—		28	2
Bordeaux	2014–15	Ligue 1	13	0	0	0	0	0	—		—		13	0
Bordeaux	2015–16	Ligue 1	26	1	1	0	1	1	7	0	—		35	2
Bordeaux	Total		39	1	1	0	1	1	7	0	—		48	2
Rennes	2016–17	Ligue 1	7	0	1	0	0	0	—		—		8	0
Rennes B	2016–17	CFA	1	0	—		—		—		—		1	0
Lens (loan)	2017–18	Ligue 2	20	1	2	0	1	0	—		—		23	1
Red Star	2018–19	Ligue 2	16	0	1	0	0	0	—		—		17	0
Poissy	2019–20	National 2	5	0	0	0	—		—		—		5	0
Poissy	2020–21	National 2	4	0	0	0	—		—		—		4	0
Poissy	2021–22	National 2	12	0	1	0	—		—		—		13	0
Poissy	Total		21	0	1	0	—		—		—		22	0
C'Chartres	2021–22	National 2	14	0	0	0	—		—		—		14	0
C'Chartres	2022–23	National 2	18	2	0	0	—		—		—		18	2
C'Chartres	Total		32	2	0	0	—		—		—		32	2
Career total			332	11	30	3	18	1	47	2	2	0	429	17

=== International ===
Appearances and goals by national team and year
National team	Year	Apps	Goals
France	2012	1	0
Total		1	0

== Honours ==
Paris Saint-Germain

- Ligue 1: 2012–13, 2014–15
- Coupe de France: 2009–10, 2014–15; runner-up: 2010–11
- Coupe de la Ligue: 2007–08; 2014–15
- Trophée des Champions: 2014

Individual

- UNFP Player of the Month: November 2010
