= 2012–13 Paris Saint-Germain FC season =

43rd season in existence of Paris Saint-Germain

Paris Saint-Germain
2012–13 season
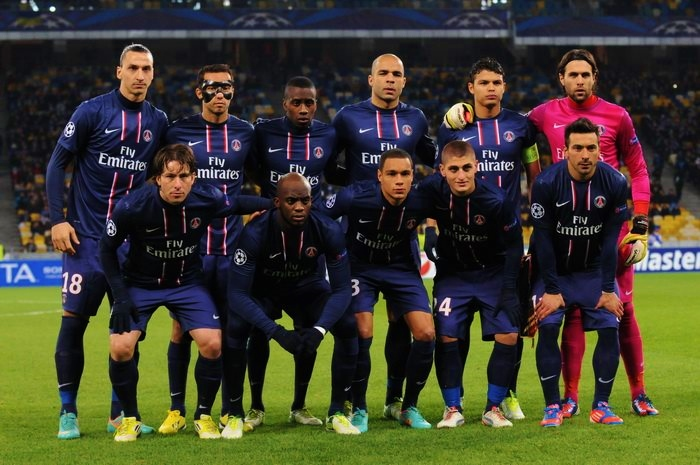
- PSG line-up against Dynamo Kyiv in the UEFA Champions League, on 21 November 2012
- President: Nasser Al-Khelaifi
- Head coach: Carlo Ancelotti
- Stadium: Parc des Princes
- Ligue 1: 1st
- Coupe de France: Quarter-finals
- Coupe de la Ligue: Quarter-finals
- UEFA Champions League: Quarter-finals
- Top goalscorer: League: Zlatan Ibrahimović (30); All: Zlatan Ibrahimović (35)
- Average home league attendance: 43,235
| Home colours | Away colours | Third colours |

The 2012–13 season was Paris Saint-Germain Football Club's 43rd in existence and their 40th in the top-flight of French football. The team competed in Ligue 1, the Coupe de France, the Coupe de la Ligue and the UEFA Champions League.

Reinforced by new stars Ezequiel Lavezzi, Zlatan Ibrahimović and Thiago Silva, PSG warmed up for the 2012–13 season with the aim of winning the league crown that dramatically eluded the club the previous year. Paris began at home to Lorient at the Parc des Princes. Les Merlus caused Paris plenty of problems and the match ended 2–2 thanks to Ibrahimović's first brace of the season. The PSG squad took a little time to get going and after three consecutive draws, Les Parisiens recorded their first victory in matchweek 4. It was in the north of France that Paris finally launched their campaign against Lille and a 2–1 victory featuring another double from Ibrahimović. Another three points followed against Toulouse (2–0), before it was time for the UEFA Champions League. After nearly a decade's absence, PSG marked their return to Europe's premier club competition with a resounding 4–1 victory over Dynamo Kyiv.

Buoyed by their continental success, the capital club recorded their largest ever away win with a 4–0 demolition of Bastia before defeating Sochaux-Montbéliard 2–0, in a perfect month of September. October began less well with a late 1–0 defeat away to Porto. Then it was time to travel to the Stade Vélodrome for Le Classique against Olympique de Marseille. Inspired, Zlatan netted two more remarkable goals as the match ended 2-2. It got even better as Stade de Reims, Dinamo Zagreb, Nancy and Marseille, this time in the Coupe de la Ligue, all fell to Paris. The first defeat of the campaign came soon after, 2–1, to Saint-Étienne. It marked the start of a difficult month of November for the side from the French capital. A festive December started in style with a 2–1 win over Porto which saw Paris clinch top spot in Group A of the Champions League. Next up came Evian (4–0), Valenciennes (0–4) and Lyon (1–0); all fell victim to the high-flying Les Rouge-et-Bleu. A comprehensive 3–0 win over Stade Brest in the final match of the calendar year saw PSG secure the honorary title of autumn champions.

2013 began with new Brazilian signing Lucas Moura meeting his new teammates. The return to competition wasn't easy with a tough and slender 4–3 win over Arras in the Coupe de France. After a scoreless draw with AC Ajaccio, Paris stepped up a gear with wins over Bordeaux, Toulouse in the Coupe de France and Lille. The run of matches saw goalkeeper Salvatore Sirigu set a new club record for longest run without conceding a goal, surpassing the previous time set by the legendary Bernard Lama. PSG then produced a huge surprise for their supporters by announcing the signature of David Beckham on the final day of the winter transfer window. The arrival of the English superstar saw the club continue on its winning ways with a 4–0 triumph over Toulouse followed by a 3–1 win over Bastia before the last 16 of the Champions League. Away to Spanish giants Valencia in the first leg, Paris run out 2–1 winners.

The return to domestic action proved a little less convincing with a 3–2 upset at the hands of Sochaux. The reaction was immediate. As Beckham debuted in his new colours, Paris recorded back to back 2–0 home wins against arch-rivals Marseille, firstly in the league and then in the Coupe de France. Paris confirmed their place in the Champions League quarter-finals with a 1–1 draw at home to Valencia. Despite hiccups against Reims (0–1) and Saint-Étienne (2–2), Paris continued to set the pace at the top of the ladder with victories over Nancy, 2–1, and defending champions Montpellier, 1–0. Then came one of the highlights of the season with the quarter-final of the Champions League against Barcelona. And the match lived up to the hype with Blaise Matuidi scoring in the last minute to secure a thrilling 2–2 draw at the Parc des Princes. PSG warmed up for the return match against the Catalan outfit with a 2–0 victory over Rennes in Ligue 1. Then, at the Camp Nou, Javier Pastore opened the scoring for Carlo Ancelotti's players, only to be eliminated on away goals by Pedro’s equaliser.

Les Rouges et Bleu bounced back with a 1–0 win over Troyes before quarter-final exits in both the Coupe de la Ligue and the Coupe de France. The players just had to focus on the Ligue 1 title and they did so with a 3–0 victory over Nice before avenging their cup exit with a 1–0 win of their own away to Evian. In the end, a 1–0 win away to Lyon secured the club's first Ligue 1 title in 19 years, and third overall. Jérémy Ménez struck the goal that sent Paris into rapture. The penultimate match of the season saw a 3–1 win over Brest at the Parc des Princes, followed by the official presentation of the Ligue 1 trophy. It also marked the final match of David Beckham's playing career. The final match of the season saw the newly-crowned 2013 champions end with a win over Lorient as Zlatan Ibrahimović received his Golden Boot trophy for Ligue 1 top scorer with 30 goals.

== Players ==
Players, transfers, appearances and goals - 2012/2013 season.

=== First-team squad ===
Note: Flags indicate national team as defined under FIFA eligibility rules; some limited exceptions apply. Players may hold more than one non-FIFA nationality.

| No. | Pos. | Nation | Player |
|---|---|---|---|
| 1 | GK | FRA | Nicolas Douchez |
| 2 | DF | BRA | Thiago Silva (captain) |
| 3 | DF | FRA | Mamadou Sakho |
| 5 | DF | CIV | Siaka Tiéné |
| 6 | DF | FRA | Zoumana Camara |
| 7 | MF | FRA | Jérémy Ménez |
| 10 | FW | SWE | Zlatan Ibrahimović |
| 11 | FW | ARG | Ezequiel Lavezzi |
| 13 | DF | BRA | Alex |
| 14 | MF | FRA | Blaise Matuidi |
| 16 | GK | FRA | Alphonse Areola |
| 17 | DF | BRA | Maxwell |

| No. | Pos. | Nation | Player |
|---|---|---|---|
| 19 | FW | FRA | Kevin Gameiro |
| 20 | MF | FRA | Clément Chantôme |
| 22 | DF | FRA | Sylvain Armand |
| 23 | DF | NED | Gregory van der Wiel |
| 24 | MF | ITA | Marco Verratti |
| 26 | DF | FRA | Christophe Jallet |
| 27 | MF | ARG | Javier Pastore |
| 28 | MF | ITA | Thiago Motta |
| 29 | MF | BRA | Lucas Moura |
| 30 | GK | ITA | Salvatore Sirigu |
| 32 | MF | ENG | David Beckham |
| 40 | GK | FRA | Ronan Le Crom |

=== Out on loan ===
Note: Flags indicate national team as defined under FIFA eligibility rules; some limited exceptions apply. Players may hold more than one non-FIFA nationality.

| No. | Pos. | Nation | Player |
|---|---|---|---|
| — | MF | MLI | Mohamed Sissoko (at Fiorentina) |
| — | MF | FRA | Mathieu Bodmer (at Saint-Étienne) |
| — | DF | URU | Diego Lugano (at Málaga) |
| — | FW | HAI | Jean-Eudes Maurice (at Le Mans) |

| No. | Pos. | Nation | Player |
|---|---|---|---|
| — | FW | FRA | Jean-Christophe Bahebeck (at Troyes) |
| — | MF | FRA | Adrien Rabiot (at Toulouse) |
| — | MF | COD | Neeskens Kebano (at Caen) |
| — | DF | FRA | Loïck Landre (at Gazélec Ajaccio) |

=== Transfers in ===
Note: Flags indicate national team as defined under FIFA eligibility rules; some limited exceptions apply. Players may hold more than one non-FIFA nationality.

| No. | Pos. | Nation | Player |
|---|---|---|---|
| — | MF | ITA | Thiago Motta (from Internazionale) |
| — | FW | ARG | Ezequiel Lavezzi (from Napoli) (€26.5 million) |
| — | DF | BRA | Thiago Silva (from Milan) (€42 million) |
| — | MF | ITA | Marco Verratti (from Pescara) (undisclosed) |
| — | FW | SWE | Zlatan Ibrahimović (from Milan) (€21 million) |

| No. | Pos. | Nation | Player |
|---|---|---|---|
| — | DF | NED | Gregory van der Wiel (from Ajax) (€6 million) |
| — | MF | BRA | Lucas Moura (from São Paulo) (€45 million) |
| — | MF | ENG | David Beckham (from LA Galaxy) (undisclosed) |

=== Transfers out ===
Note: Flags indicate national team as defined under FIFA eligibility rules; some limited exceptions apply. Players may hold more than one non-FIFA nationality.

| No. | Pos. | Nation | Player |
|---|---|---|---|
| — | DF | BRA | Ceará (Cruzeiro) |
| — | FW | FRA | Loris Arnaud (Chernomorets Burgas) |
| — | MF | COD | Granddi Ngoyi (to Troyes) |
| — | DF | SRB | Milan Biševac (to Lyon) |

| No. | Pos. | Nation | Player |
|---|---|---|---|
| — | FW | FRA | Péguy Luyindula (free agent) |
| — | FW | FRA | Guillaume Hoarau (to Dalian Yifang) |
| — | MF | BRA | Nenê (to Al-Gharafa) |
| — | FW | BRA | Éverton Santos (to Seongnam Ilhwa Chunma) |

=== Appearances and goals ===
| Player | Position | Appearances | Goals | Profile |
First-team squad
| (France) Blaise Matuidi | MF | 52 | 8 | |
| (Argentina) Javier Pastore | MF | 48 | 9 | |
| (Brazil) Maxwell | DF | 48 | 2 | |
| (Sweden) Zlatan Ibrahimović | FW | 46 | 35 | |
| (Italy) Salvatore Sirigu | GK | 43 | 0 | |
| (Argentina) Ezequiel Lavezzi | FW | 42 | 11 | |
| (France) Jérémy Ménez | MF | 42 | 8 | |
| (France) Christophe Jallet | DF | 41 | 0 | |
| (Italy) Marco Verratti | MF | 39 | 0 | |
| (France) Clément Chantôme | MF | 38 | 1 | |
| (Brazil) Alex | DF | 34 | 4 | |
| (Brazil) Thiago Silva | DF | 34 | 3 | |
| (France) Mamadou Sakho | DF | 34 | 2 | |
| (France) Kevin Gameiro | FW | 32 | 9 | |
| (Netherlands) Gregory van der Wiel | DF | 29 | 1 | |
| (France) Sylvain Armand | DF | 23 | 0 | |
| (Italy) Thiago Motta | MF | 15 | 1 | |
| (Brazil) Lucas Moura | MF | 15 | 0 | |
| (England) David Beckham | MF | 14 | 0 | |
| (France) Zoumana Camara | DF | 11 | 1 | |
| (France) Nicolas Douchez | GK | 10 | 0 | |
| (Ivory Coast) Siaka Tiéné | DF | 4 | 0 | |
| (France) Alphonse Areola | GK | 2 | 0 | |
| (France) Ronan Le Crom | GK | 1 | 0 | |
Paris Saint-Germain Academy
| (France) Antoine Conte | DF | 1 | 0 | |
| (France) Kingsley Coman | MF | 1 | 0 | |
| (France) Hervin Ongenda | FW | 1 | 0 | |
Transferred / loaned out during the season
| (Brazil) Nenê | MF | 14 | 1 | |
| (France) Guillaume Hoarau | FW | 9 | 2 | |
| (France) Adrien Rabiot | MF | 9 | 0 | |
| (Mali) Mohamed Sissoko | MF | 8 | 0 | |
| (France) Mathieu Bodmer | MF | 7 | 0 | |
| (France) Péguy Luyindula | FW | 1 | 0 | |
| Own goals | | | 3 | |
| Total goals | | | 101 | |

== Competitions ==
=== Ligue 1 ===
==== League table ====
| Pos | Team | Pld | W | D | L | GF | GA | GD | Pts | Qualification or relegation |
|---|---|---|---|---|---|---|---|---|---|---|
| 1 | Paris Saint-Germain (C) | 38 | 25 | 8 | 5 | 69 | 23 | +46 | 83 | Qualification for the Champions League group stage |
| 2 | Marseille | 38 | 21 | 8 | 9 | 42 | 36 | +6 | 71 | Qualification for the Champions League group stage |
| 3 | Lyon | 38 | 19 | 10 | 9 | 61 | 38 | +23 | 67 | Qualification for the Champions League third qualifying round |
| 4 | Nice | 38 | 18 | 10 | 10 | 57 | 46 | +11 | 64 | Qualification for the Europa League play-off round |
| 5 | Saint-Étienne | 38 | 16 | 15 | 7 | 60 | 32 | +28 | 63 | Qualification for the Europa League third qualifying round (Note: Saint-Étienne, as winner of the 2012–13 Coupe de la Ligue, qualifies for the third qualifying round of 2013–14 UEFA Europa League.) |

Source: Ligue 1
Rules for classification: 1) points; 2) goal difference; 3) number of goals scored.
(C) Champions

==== Results summary ====
| Overall | | | | | | | | Home | | | | | | Away | | | | | |
| Pld | W | D | L | GF | GA | GD | Pts | W | D | L | GF | GA | GD | W | D | L | GF | GA | GD |
|---|---|---|---|---|---|---|---|---|---|---|---|---|---|---|---|---|---|---|---|
| 38 | 25 | 8 | 5 | 69 | 23 | +46 | 83 | 13 | 4 | 2 | 34 | 10 | +24 | 12 | 4 | 3 | 35 | 13 | +22 |

Source: LFP.fr

==== Results by round ====
| Round | 1 | 2 | 3 | 4 | 5 | 6 | 7 | 8 | 9 | 10 | 11 | 12 | 13 | 14 | 15 | 16 | 17 | 18 | 19 | 20 | 21 | 22 | 23 | 24 | 25 | 26 | 27 | 28 | 29 | 30 | 31 | 32 | 33 | 34 | 35 | 36 | 37 | 38 |
|---|---|---|---|---|---|---|---|---|---|---|---|---|---|---|---|---|---|---|---|---|---|---|---|---|---|---|---|---|---|---|---|---|---|---|---|---|---|---|
| Ground | H | A | H | A | H | A | H | A | H | A | H | A | H | H | A | H | A | H | A | H | A | H | A | H | A | H | A | H | A | H | A | A | H | A | H | A | H | A |
| Result | D | D | D | W | W | W | W | D | W | W | L | D | L | W | L | W | W | W | W | D | W | W | W | W | L | W | L | W | D | W | W | W | W | W | D | W | W | W |
| Position | 9 | 12 | 11 | 8 | 4 | 3 | 2 | 2 | 1 | 1 | 2 | 2 | 3 | 2 | 4 | 2 | 2 | 1 | 1 | 2 | 1 | 1 | 1 | 1 | 1 | 1 | 1 | 1 | 1 | 1 | 1 | 1 | 1 | 1 | 1 | 1 | 1 | 1 |

Source: LFP.fr
A = Away; H = Home; W = Win; D = Draw; L = Loss

==== Matches ====
Win Draw Loss

| 11 August 2012 1 | Paris Saint-Germain | 2–2 | Lorient | Paris |
| | Ibrahimović 64', 90' (pen.) | Report | Maxwell 4' (o.g.); Aliadière 45+3' | Stadium: Parc des Princes; Attendance: 43,000; Referee: Tony Chapron |

| 19 August 2012 2 | Ajaccio | 0–0 | Paris Saint-Germain | Ajaccio |
| | | Report | | Stadium: Stade François Coty; Attendance: 9,402; Referee: Clément Turpin |

| 26 August 2012 3 | Paris Saint-Germain | 0–0 | Bordeaux | Paris |
| | | Report | | Stadium: Parc des Princes; Attendance: 41,164; Referee: Antony Gautier |

| 2 September 2012 4 | Lille | 1–2 | Paris Saint-Germain | Villeneuve-d'Ascq |
| | Chedjou 12' | Report | Ibrahimović 1', 21' | Stadium: Grand Stade Lille Métropole; Attendance: 32,707; Referee: Ruddy Buquet |

| 14 September 2012 5 | Paris Saint-Germain | 2–0 | Toulouse | Paris |
| | Pastore 38'; Ibrahimović 69' | Report | | Stadium: Parc des Princes; Attendance: 43,224; Referee: Alexandre Castro |

| 22 September 2012 6 | Bastia | 0–4 | Paris Saint-Germain | Furiani |
| | | Report | Ménez 6'; Ibrahimović 40', 90'; Matuidi 72' | Stadium: Stade Armand-Cesari; Attendance: 16,054; Referee: Saïd Ennjimi |

| 29 September 2012 7 | Paris Saint-Germain | 2–0 | Sochaux | Paris |
| | Gameiro 11', 33' | Report | | Stadium: Parc des Princes; Attendance: 44,552; Referee: Wilfried Bien |

| 7 October 2012 8 | Marseille | 2–2 | Paris Saint-Germain | Marseille |
| | Gignac 18', 32' | Report | Ibrahimović 23', 25' | Stadium: Stade Vélodrome; Attendance: 40,748; Referee: Tony Chapron |

| 20 October 2012 9 | Paris Saint-Germain | 1–0 | Reims | Paris |
| | Gameiro 65' | Report | | Stadium: Parc des Princes; Attendance: 45,432; Referee: Benoît Bastien |

| 27 October 2012 10 | Nancy | 0–1 | Paris Saint-Germain | Tomblaine |
| | | Report | Ibrahimović 74' | Stadium: Stade Marcel Picot; Attendance: 18,275; Referee: Alexandre Castro |

| 3 November 2012 11 | Paris Saint-Germain | 1–2 | Saint-Étienne | Paris |
| | Ibrahimović (red card) 70'; Hoarau 88' | Report | Sakho 55' (o.g.); Aubameyang 73' | Stadium: Parc des Princes; Attendance: 44,516; Referee: Laurent Duhamel |

| 11 November 2012 12 | Montpellier | 1–1 | Paris Saint-Germain | Montpellier |
| | Cabella 60' | Report | Maxwell 37' | Stadium: Stade de la Mosson; Attendance: 22,242; Referee: Clément Turpin |

| 17 November 2012 13 | Paris Saint-Germain | 1–2 | Rennes | Paris |
| | Nenê 21' | Report | Alessandrini 13'; Féret 35' | Stadium: Parc des Princes; Attendance: 42,196; Referee: Fredy Fautrel |

| 24 November 2012 14 | Paris Saint-Germain | 4–0 | Troyes | Paris |
| | Maxwell 17'; Matuidi 63'; Ibrahimović 70', 89' | Report | | Stadium: Parc des Princes; Attendance: 39,588; Referee: Bartolomeu Varela |

| 1 December 2012 15 | Nice | 2–1 | Paris Saint-Germain | Nice |
| | Bauthéac 76'; Eysseric 86' | Report | Ibrahimović 82' | Stadium: Stade du Ray; Attendance: 16,356; Referee: Ruddy Buquet |

| 8 December 2012 16 | Paris Saint-Germain | 4–0 | Evian | Paris |
| | Ibrahimović 28'; Lavezzi 31'; Motta 84'; Gameiro 87' | Report | | Stadium: Parc des Princes; Attendance: 39,276; Referee: Olivier Thual |

| 11 December 2012 17 | Valenciennes | 0–4 | Paris Saint-Germain | Valenciennes |
| | | Report | Ibrahimović 28', 49', 53'; Lavezzi 82' | Stadium: Stade du Hainaut; Attendance: 23,021; Referee: Wilfried Bien |

| 16 December 2012 18 | Paris Saint-Germain | 1–0 | Lyon | Paris |
| | Matuidi 45+2' | Report | | Stadium: Parc des Princes; Attendance: 44,768; Referee: Antony Gautier |

| 21 December 2012 19 | Brest | 0–3 | Paris Saint-Germain | Brest |
| | | Report | Ibrahimović 55'; Gameiro 73'; Mendy 90+2' (o.g.) | Stadium: Stade Francis-Le Blé; Attendance: 15,101; Referee: Sébastien Moreira |

| 11 January 2013 20 | Paris Saint-Germain | 0–0 | Ajaccio | Paris |
| | | Report | | Stadium: Parc des Princes; Attendance: 42,008; Referee: Nicolas Rainville |

| 20 January 2013 21 | Bordeaux | 0–1 | Paris Saint-Germain | Bordeaux |
| | | Report | Ibrahimović 43' | Stadium: Stade Chaban-Delmas; Attendance: 32,013; Referee: Stéphane Lannoy |

| 27 January 2013 22 | Paris Saint-Germain | 1–0 | Lille | Paris |
| | Chedjou 68' (o.g.) | Report | | Stadium: Parc des Princes; Attendance: 42,029; Referee: Fredy Fautrel |

| 1 February 2013 23 | Toulouse | 0–4 | Paris Saint-Germain | Toulouse |
| | | Report | Pastore 4'; Ibrahimović 36'; Sakho 70'; Van der Wiel 72' | Stadium: Stadium Municipal; Attendance: 35,012; Referee: Tony Chapron |

| 8 February 2013 24 | Paris Saint-Germain | 3–1 | Bastia | Paris |
| | Ménez 56'; Ibrahimović 71' (pen.); Lavezzi 89' | Report | Khazri 83' | Stadium: Parc des Princes; Attendance: 44,619; Referee: Olivier Thual |

| 17 February 2013 25 | Sochaux | 3–2 | Paris Saint-Germain | Montbéliard |
| | Roudet 36'; Sio 54'; Bakambu 83' | Report | Alex 29'; Sakho 76' | Stadium: Stade Auguste-Bonal; Attendance: 19,390; Referee: Lionel Jaffredo |

| 24 February 2013 26 | Paris Saint-Germain | 2–0 | Marseille | Paris |
| | N'Koulou 11' (o.g.); Ibrahimović 90+1' | Report | | Stadium: Parc des Princes; Attendance: 44,984; Referee: Fredy Fautrel |

| 2 March 2013 27 | Reims | 1–0 | Paris Saint-Germain | Reims |
| | Krychowiak 64' | Report | | Stadium: Stade Auguste Delaune; Attendance: 20,098; Referee: Philippe Kalt |

| 9 March 2013 28 | Paris Saint-Germain | 2–1 | Nancy | Paris |
| | Ibrahimović 59', 62' | Report | Moukandjo 36' | Stadium: Parc des Princes; Attendance: 44,990; Referee: Mikaël Lesage |

| 17 March 2013 29 | Saint-Étienne | 2–2 | Paris Saint-Germain | Saint-Étienne |
| | Alex 37' (o.g.); Clerc 72' | Report | Pastore 9'; Ibrahimović 19' (pen.) | Stadium: Stade Geoffroy-Guichard; Attendance: 25,036; Referee: Antony Gautier |

| 29 March 2013 30 | Paris Saint-Germain | 1–0 | Montpellier | Paris |
| | Gameiro 80' | Report | | Stadium: Parc des Princes; Attendance: 44,718; Referee: Wilfried Bien |

| 6 April 2013 31 | Rennes | 0–2 | Paris Saint-Germain | Rennes |
| | | Report | Ménez 56'; Ibrahimović 90+3' | Stadium: Stade de la Route de Lorient; Attendance: 28,131; Referee: Saïd Ennjimi |

| 13 April 2013 32 | Troyes | 0–1 | Paris Saint-Germain | Troyes |
| | | Report | Matuidi 65' | Stadium: Stade de l'Aube; Attendance: 18,648; Referee: Benoît Bastien |

| 21 April 2013 33 | Paris Saint-Germain | 3–0 | Nice | Paris |
| | Ménez 10'; Ibrahimović 65' (pen.); Chantôme 88' | Report | | Stadium: Parc des Princes; Attendance: 45,369; Referee: Tony Chapron |

| 28 April 2013 34 | Evian | 0–1 | Paris Saint-Germain | Annecy |
| | | Report | Pastore 50' | Stadium: Parc des Sports; Attendance: 14,621; Referee: Olivier Thual |

| 5 May 2013 35 | Paris Saint-Germain | 1–1 | Valenciennes | Paris |
| | Alex 84' | Report | Danic 17' | Stadium: Parc des Princes; Attendance: 44,948; Referee: Alexandre Castro |

| 12 May 2013 36 | Lyon | 0–1 | Paris Saint-Germain | Lyon |
| | | Report | Ménez 53' | Stadium: Stade de Gerland; Attendance: 39,939; Referee: Stéphane Lannoy |

| 18 May 2013 37 | Paris Saint-Germain | 3–1 | Brest | Paris |
| | Ibrahimović 4', 36'; Matuidi 31' | Report | Benschop 81' | Stadium: Parc des Princes; Attendance: 44,983; Referee: Ruddy Buquet |

| 26 May 2013 38 | Lorient | 1–3 | Paris Saint-Germain | Lorient |
| | Le Lan 84' (pen.) | Report | Ibrahimović 51'; Gameiro 63', 65' | Stadium: Stade du Moustoir; Attendance: 16,336; Referee: Benoît Bastien |

=== Coupe de France ===
| 6 January 2013 Round of 64 | Arras | 3–4 | Paris Saint-Germain | Calais |
| | Aït-Bouhou 26'; Desprès 52'; Bernard 83' | Report | Lavezzi 7', 68'; Matuidi 10'; Camara 39' | Stadium: Stade de l'Épopée; Attendance: 12,000; Referee: Mikaël Lesage |

| 23 January 2013 Round of 32 | Paris Saint-Germain | 3–1 | Toulouse | Paris |
| | Gameiro 8'; Pastore 48'; Lavezzi 66' | Report | Tabanou 18' | Stadium: Parc des Princes; Attendance: 32,867; Referee: Laurent Duhamel |

| 27 February 2013 Round of 16 | Paris Saint-Germain | 2–0 | Marseille | Paris |
| | Ibrahimović 34', 64' (pen.) | Report | | Stadium: Parc des Princes; Attendance: 42,000; Referee: Stéphane Lannoy |

| 17 April 2013 Quarter-finals | Evian | 1–1 (4–1 p) | Paris Saint-Germain | Annecy |
| | Khelifa 43' | Report | Pastore 8' | Stadium: Parc des Sports; Attendance: 14,925; Referee: Philippe Kalt |
| | Penalties |
| | Sorlin (penalty scored); Sagbo (penalty scored); Khelifa (penalty scored); Barbosa (penalty scored) | | (penalty missed) Ibrahimović; (penalty missed) Thiago Silva; (penalty scored) Lavezzi |

=== Coupe de la Ligue ===
| 31 October 2012 Round of 16 | Paris Saint-Germain | 2–0 | Marseille | Paris |
| | Thiago Silva 28' (pen.); Ménez 50' | Report | | Stadium: Parc des Princes; Attendance: 43,753; Referee: Antony Gautier |

| 27 November 2012 Quarter-finals | Saint-Étienne | 0–0 (a.e.t.) (5–3 p) | Paris Saint-Germain | Saint-Étienne |
| | | Report | | Stadium: Stade Geoffroy-Guichard; Attendance: 25,306; Referee: Lionel Jaffredo |
| | Penalties |
| | Cohade (penalty scored); Ghoulam (penalty scored); Brandão (penalty scored); Perrin (penalty scored); Aubameyang (penalty scored) | | (penalty scored) Ibrahimović; (penalty scored) Nenê; (penalty missed) Thiago Silva; (penalty scored) Armand |

=== UEFA Champions League ===
==== Group stage ====
| Pos | Team | Pld | W | D | L | GF | GA | GD | Pts | Qualification | PAR | POR | DKV | DZG |
|---|---|---|---|---|---|---|---|---|---|---|---|---|---|---|
| 1 | (France) Paris Saint-Germain | 6 | 5 | 0 | 1 | 14 | 3 | +11 | 15 | Advance to knockout phase | — | 2–1 | 4–1 | 4–0 |
| 2 | (Portugal) Porto | 6 | 4 | 1 | 1 | 10 | 4 | +6 | 13 | Advance to knockout phase | 1–0 | — | 3–2 | 3–0 |
| 3 | (Ukraine) Dynamo Kyiv | 6 | 1 | 2 | 3 | 6 | 10 | −4 | 5 | Transfer to Europa League | 0–2 | 0–0 | — | 2–0 |
| 4 | (Croatia) Dinamo Zagreb | 6 | 0 | 1 | 5 | 1 | 14 | −13 | 1 | | 0–2 | 0–2 | 1–1 | — |

Source: Soccerway

| 18 September 2012 1 | Paris Saint-Germain (France) | 4–1 | (Ukraine) Dynamo Kyiv | Paris, France |
| | Ibrahimović 19' (pen.); Thiago Silva 29'; Alex 32'; Pastore 90+1' | Report | Veloso 87' | Stadium: Parc des Princes; Attendance: 42,536; Referee: Björn Kuipers (Netherlands) |

| 3 October 2012 2 | Porto (Portugal) | 1–0 | (France) Paris Saint-Germain | Porto, Portugal |
| | Rodríguez 83' | Report | | Stadium: Estádio do Dragão; Attendance: 36,509; Referee: Howard Webb (England) |

| 24 October 2012 3 | Dinamo Zagreb (Croatia) | 0–2 | (France) Paris Saint-Germain | Zagreb, Croatia |
| | | Report | Ibrahimović 33'; Ménez 43' | Stadium: Stadion Maksimir; Attendance: 9,326; Referee: Fırat Aydınus (Turkey) |

| 6 November 2012 4 | Paris Saint-Germain (France) | 4–0 | (Croatia) Dinamo Zagreb | Paris, France |
| | Alex 16'; Matuidi 61'; Ménez 65'; Hoarau 80' | Report | | Stadium: Parc des Princes; Attendance: 41,060; Referee: Paweł Gil (Poland) |

| 21 November 2012 5 | Dynamo Kyiv (Ukraine) | 0–2 | (France) Paris Saint-Germain | Kyiv, Ukraine |
| | | Report | Lavezzi 45', 52' | Stadium: Olimpiyskiy Stadium; Attendance: 36,712; Referee: Wolfgang Stark (Germany) |

| 4 December 2012 6 | Paris Saint-Germain (France) | 2–1 | (Portugal) Porto | Paris, France |
| | Thiago Silva 29'; Lavezzi 61' | Report | Martínez 33' | Stadium: Parc des Princes; Attendance: 45,512; Referee: Craig Thomson (Scotland) |

==== Knockout phase ====
===== Round of 16 =====
| 12 February 2013 First leg | Valencia (Spain) | 1–2 | (France) Paris Saint-Germain | Valencia, Spain |
| | Rami 90' | Report | Lavezzi 10'; Pastore 43' | Stadium: Mestalla Stadium; Attendance: 49,000; Referee: Paolo Tagliavento (Italy) |

| 6 March 2013 Second leg | Paris Saint-Germain (France) | 1–1 (3–2 agg.) | (Spain) Valencia | Paris, France |
| | Lavezzi 66' | Report | Jonas 55' | Stadium: Parc des Princes; Attendance: 44,867; Referee: Milorad Mažić (Serbia) |

===== Quarter-finals =====
| 2 April 2013 First leg | Paris Saint-Germain (France) | 2–2 | (Spain) Barcelona | Paris, France |
| | Ibrahimović 79'; Matuidi 90+4' | Report | Messi 38'; Xavi 89' (pen.) | Stadium: Parc des Princes; Attendance: 45,336; Referee: Wolfgang Stark (Germany) |

| 10 April 2013 Second leg | Barcelona (Spain) | 1–1 (3a–3 agg.) | (France) Paris Saint-Germain | Barcelona, Spain |
| | Pedro 71' | Report | Pastore 50' | Stadium: Nou Camp; Attendance: 99,000; Referee: Björn Kuipers (Netherlands) |
