= 2008 Coupe de la Ligue final =

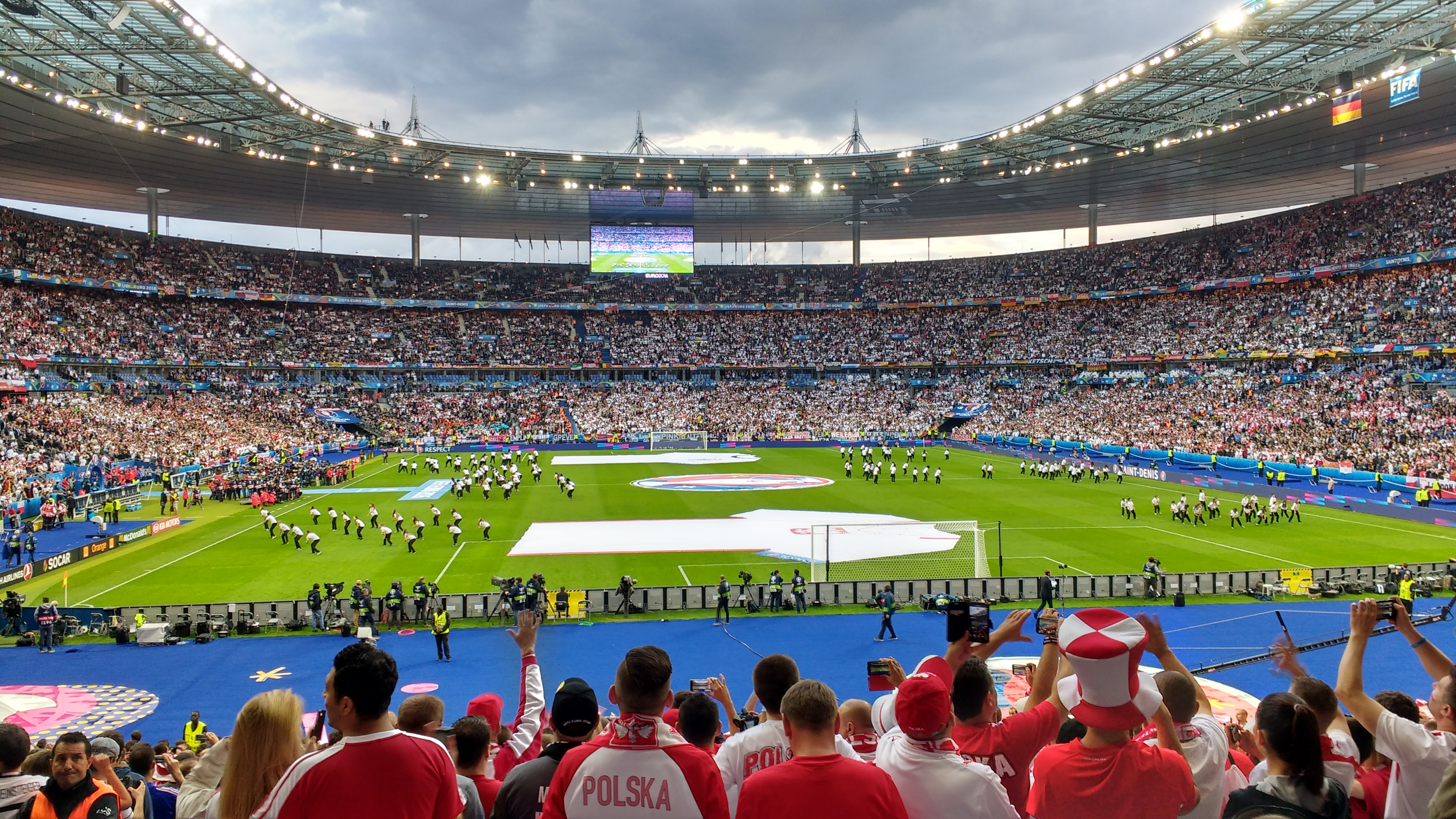
- Event: 2007–08 Coupe de la Ligue
Paris Saint-Germain	Lens
Ligue 1	Ligue 1
2	1
- Date: 29 March 2008
- Venue: Stade de France, Saint-Denis
- Referee: Laurent Duhamel
- Attendance: 78,741

The 2008 Coupe de la Ligue final was a football match held at the Stade de France in Saint-Denis on 29 March 2008. It was contested between Paris Saint-Germain (PSG) and Lens.

It was PSG's fourth appearance in the final; they won the inaugural cup in 1995, won again in 1998, and lost to Gueugnon in the 2000 final. It was Lens' second appearance in the final, having won the cup in their only other appearance back in 1999.

After an opening goal from Pauleta, Lens secured an equaliser just after halftime from Eric Carrière. With extra time looming, PSG striker Péguy Luyindula was hauled down by Hilton in the penalty area which resulted in the referee pointing to the spot. Bernard Mendy converted the kick, giving PSG their third Coupe de la Ligue title and a spot in the 2008–09 UEFA Cup.

Lens mayor Guy Delcourt wanted the match to be replayed after a PSG fan unfurled a banner insulting inhabitants of the Nord-Pas-de-Calais region (taking inspiration from a comedy movie of the time) midway through the game. The match was not replayed, but PSG were fined and penalised. One of the sanctions was that they would be unable to participate in the following edition of the League Cup, however this was later overturned on appeal.

== Route to the final ==
Note: In all results below, the score of the finalist is given first (H: home; A: away).

Paris Saint-Germain		Round	Lens	
Opponent	Result	2007–08 Coupe de la Ligue	Opponent	Result
Lorient (A)	3–0	Third round	Lille (H)	1–0
Montpellier (H)	2–0	Round of 16	Monaco (A)	2–1
Valenciennes (H)	4–0	Quarter-finals	Nancy (H)	3–0
Auxerre (A)	3–2	Semi-finals	Le Mans (A)	5–4

== Match details ==
29 March 2008
21:00

Paris Saint-Germain	2–1	Lens
Pauleta 19'; Mendy 90+3'	Report	Carrière 51'

Stade de France, Saint-Denis
Attendance: 78,741
Referee: Laurent Duhamel

PSG	RC Lens

PSG:
GK	1	(France) Mickaël Landreau
RB	2	(Brazil) Ceará
CB	3	(France) Mamadou Sakho
CB	15	(France) Zoumana Camara
LB	22	(France) Sylvain Armand
RM	20	(France) Clément Chantôme	(yellow card) 55'	(substituted off) 64'
CM	24	(France) Grégory Bourillon
CM	23	(France) Jérémy Clément
LM	25	(France) Jérôme Rothen
FW	9	(Portugal) Pauleta (c)		(substituted off) 66'
FW	11	(Ivory Coast) Amara Diané
Substitutes:
GK	16	(France) Jérôme Alonzo
DF	5	(France) Bernard Mendy		(substituted on) 64'
DF	12	(Democratic Republic of the Congo) Larrys Mabiala
MF	10	(Brazil) Souza
FW	7	(France) Péguy Luyindula		(substituted on) 66'
FW	14	(France) David Ngog
FW	18	(France) Loris Arnaud
Manager:
(France) Paul Le Guen

RC Lens:
GK	16	(France) Ronan Le Crom
RB	15	(France) Fabien Laurenti	(yellow card) 36'
CB	4	(France) Adama Coulibaly
CB	3	(Brazil) Hilton (c)	(yellow card) 90+3'
LB	11	(Algeria) Nadir Belhadj
AM	10	(France) Eric Carrière
DM	23	(Serbia) Nenad Kovačević
DM	6	(Senegal) Kader Mangane
AM	14	(France) Kévin Monnet-Paquet		(substituted off) 68'
FW	8	(France) Toifilou Maoulida		(substituted off) 84'
FW	9	(France) Loïc Rémy		(substituted off) 13'
Substitutes:
GK	1	(Croatia) Vedran Runje
DF	2	(Portugal) Marco Ramos
DF	26	(France) Yohan Demont		(substituted on) 84'
MF	28	(France) Julien Sablé
MF	18	(France) Olivier Monterrubio		(substituted on) 13'
MF	21	(Mali) Sidi Yaya Keita
FW	27	(Ivory Coast) Aruna Dindane		(substituted on) 68'
Manager:
(France) Jean-Pierre Papin

MATCH OFFICIALS

- Assistant referees:
  - Vincent Texier
  - Stéphane Duhamel
- Fourth official: Olivier Thual

MAN OF THE MATCH

MATCH RULES

- 90 minutes.
- 30 minutes extra-time (15 minute intervals)
- Penalty shoot-out if scores level after extra time.
- Seven named substitutes
- Maximum of 3 substitutions.

== See also ==
- 2008 Coupe de France final
- 2007–08 RC Lens season
- 2007–08 Paris Saint-Germain FC season
