= Bassirou Dembélé =

Malian footballer (born 1990)

Personal information
- Date of birth: 28 January 1990 (age 36)
- Place of birth: Bamako, Mali
- Height: 1.82 m (5 ft 11 1/2 in)
- Position: Midfielder

Team information
- Current team: AS Bakaridjan

Youth career
- Djoliba AC
- Paris Saint-Germain

Senior career*
Years	Team	Apps	(Gls)
2010–2012	Slavia Prague	9	(0)
2011–2012	Slavia Prague B		
2012–2013	Enosis Neon Paralimni		
2013	Stade Malien		
2014–2015	AS Bakaridjan		
2015	AS Gebès	15	(0)
2015-2017	USFAS Bamako		
2017	Anagennisi Karditsas	19	(0)
- * Club domestic league appearances and goals as of 7 January 2023

Bassirou Dembélé (born 28 January 1990) is a Malian footballer who last played for Anagennisi Karditsas.
