= Loris Arnaud =

French footballer (born 1987)

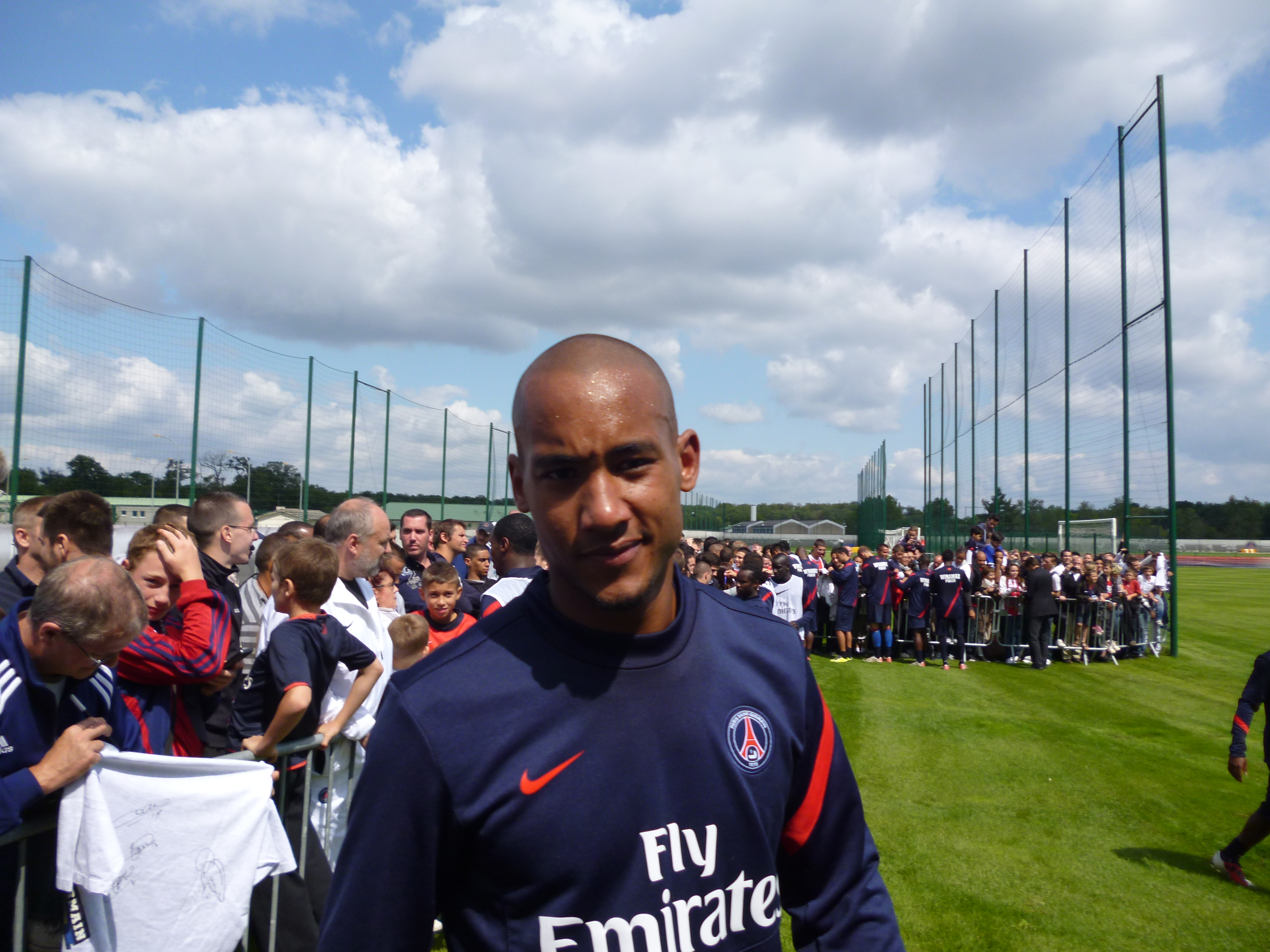
- Arnaud with Paris Saint-Germain in 2011

Personal information
- Date of birth: 16 April 1987 (age 39)
- Place of birth: Saint-Germain-en-Laye, France
- Height: 1.82 m (6 ft 0 in)
- Position: Forward

Team information
- Current team: Chatou
- Number: 11

Senior career*
Years	Team	Apps	(Gls)
2007–2012	Paris Saint-Germain	19	(2)
2010	→ Clermont (loan)	17	(3)
2010–2011	→ Angers (loan)	21	(1)
2013	Chernomorets	6	(2)
2014–2015	Orléans	35	(1)
2016–2017	Hanoi	16	(7)
2018	Persela Lamongan	29	(15)
2019	TIRA-Persikabo	21	(7)
2021	Versailles	0	(0)
2021–2022	Poissy	17	(1)
2022–2023	C'Chartres	19	(4)
2023–	Chatou	15	(0)
- * Club domestic league appearances and goals as of 18 May 2024

Loris Arnaud (born 16 April 1987) is a French professional footballer who plays as a forward for Championnat National 3 club Chatou.

== Early career ==
Born in Saint-Germain-en-Laye, Arnaud was raised in Chatou, western Paris. He started playing football aged five after his father introduced him to football and joined local football club Chatou. Soon, aged 12, Arnaud was spotted by Paris Saint-Germain scouts and joined the club after being persuaded by the club's academies.

== Club career ==
=== Paris Saint-Germain ===
Having joined the Paris Saint-Germain's academy aged 12, Arnaud spent seven years in the academy. In the 2007–08 season, Arnaud was soon placed in the first team by manager Paul Le Guen. He made his debut, coming on as a substitute for Pierre-Alain Frau, in a 0–0 draw against Lens on 12 August 2007. A week later, after his debut, Arnaud then signed his first professional contract. Having appeared six times for the club in the first team, Arnaud finally scored his first goal for the club, in a 2–1 win over Strasbourg on 3 November 2007. Having 17 appearances in all competitions so far, Arnaud signed a new two-year contract with the club, that will keep him until 2010. Soon after, Arnaud soon strained right ankle, that kept him out for a months In the Coupe de France Round of 16 against Bastia, Arnaud scored twice for the club, in a 2–0 victory.

The following season, Arnaud soon made his first appearance of the season, scoring his first goal, from a header, which turns out to be a winner against Lorient on 18 October 2008. However, in the UEFA Cup match against German side Schalke 04, Arnaud suffered an injury after rupturing his cruciate ligament. Following an operation, Arnaud will be out for six months. During on the sidelines, Arnaud says he have a rough time being on the sidelined, having spent five weeks on the plastered. Arnaud also revealed in another interview that he was treated positive by the club doctor and physiotherapists. Towards the end of the season, Arnaud made his first appearance since injury, playing in the reserve. At the end of the 2008–09 season, Arnaud would sign a new two-year contract, which would keep him until 2012.

The following season, under new manager Antoine Kombouaré, who replaced Le Guen, Arnaud first team was soon limited, having been left out of the squad. Throughout the first half of the season, Arnaud rarely kick a ball, having spent time on the bench being unused. In late-October, Arnaud made headlines after his teammate and himself, were tested for Swine flu H1N1 virus, along with Ludovic Giuly, Jérémy Clément and Mamadou Sakho. Eventually, Arnaud was eventually cleared from Swine flu H1N1 virus, having tested negative. He would make two appearances in the Coupe de la Ligue campaign.

Towards the second half of 2011–12 season, Arnaud was linked a Ligue 1 side Nice, but the transfer never started. Arnaud was also left out of the squad, having spent time at the bench or sent back to the reserve. In December, Arnaud was linked with a move to Championship side Middlesbrough, in which they offered him a trial. Three days after his trial at Middlesbrough, Arnaud had his trial with the club ended and made a return to the club. Shortly after the trial, Arnaud was told by the club that he can leave the club on a free transfer. At the end of the season, Arnaud have left the club as a free agent after his contract has expired. After being released, He was closed to joining Portuguese side Marítimo, but the move collapsed over the club's finance trouble

=== Loan spell ===
In early-November, Arnaud was linked with a loan move to Strasbourg, but the move was rejected by PSG. But in mid-January, Arnaud would join Clermont on loan, for the rest of the season. He made his debut for the club, in a 3–0 loss against Sedan on 29 January 2010. A week later, on 5 February 2010, he scored his first goal for the club in a 3–1 win over Châteauroux. Two week later, on 19 February 2010, he scored again, and also his second goal, in a 1–1 draw against Strasbourg. Arnaud says his loan at the club, describing his role as 'positive'.

The next season, Arnaud was linked with a potential loan move to Guingamp and Brest. Arnaud joined Angers on a season-long loan for the remainder of the 2010–11 season.

=== Career after Paris-Saint Germain ===
Arnaud was on trial with English League One club Tranmere Rovers. The trial ended in January 2013 when the Football League denied international clearance for the player due to its regulations on the limit of French strikers per club.

On 28 February 2013, after two weeks trial period Loris joined Chernomorets. One week after joining the club, on 10 March 2013, Arnaud made his debut for the club against CSKA Sofia and soon scored his first goal for the club, on 10 April 2013, against Minyor Pernik. He was released in late May 2013.

=== Hanoi FC ===
In January 2016, as a free agent, he completed his move to V.League 1 club Hanoi one a one-year deal.

== Honours ==
Paris Saint-Germain

- Coupe de la Ligue: 2007–08

Hà Nội F.C.

- V.League 1: 2016; third place 2017
- Vietnamese Super Cup runner-up: 2016
- Vietnamese National Cup runner-up: 2016
