= 2007–08 Coupe de la Ligue =

French League Cup

Tournament details
- Country: France
- Dates: 14 August 2007 – 29 March 2008
- Teams: 45

Final positions
- Champions: Paris Saint-Germain (3rd title)
- Runners-up: Lens

Tournament statistics
- Matches played: 43
- Goals scored: 127 (2.95 per match)
- Top goal scorer: Pauleta (6 goals)

The 2007–08 Coupe de la Ligue began on 14 August 2007. The final was held on 29 March 2008 at the Stade de France. The defending champions were Bordeaux, who defeated Lyon 1–0 on 31 March 2007. The defending champions were eliminated from the competition on 26 September 2007 by Metz. The 2008 Coupe de la Ligue champions were Paris Saint-Germain, who defeated Lens 2–1 in the final to claim their third Coupe de la Ligue trophy and also received a place in the UEFA Cup.

== First round ==
The matches were played on 14 August 2007.

Team 1	Score	Team 2
Istres	0–4	Laval
Libourne	1–2	Sète
Créteil	0–3	Clermont
Tours	1–2	Niort
Boulogne	0–0 (a.e.t.) (4–3 p)	Angers

== Second round ==
The matches were played on 28 August 2007.

Team 1	Score	Team 2
Nantes	1–0	Sedan
Le Havre	2–0	Châteauroux
Montpellier	1–1 (a.e.t.) (4–2 p)	Dijon
Troyes	2–0	Gueugnon
Amiens	1–1 (a.e.t.) (3–2 p)	Guingamp
Ajaccio	1–2	Clermont
Boulogne	2–0	Reims
Niort	1–0	Grenoble
Sète	2–2 (a.e.t.) (5–6 p)	Brest
Laval	3–1	Bastia

== Third round ==
The matches were played on 25, 26 and 27 September 2007.

Team 1	Score	Team 2
Nancy	3–0	Boulogne
Stade Brestois	1–2 (a.e.t.)	Montpellier
Niort	3–2 (a.e.t.)	Le Havre
Auxerre	1–0 (a.e.t.)	Saint-Étienne
Lens	1–0	Lille
Clermont	0–1 (a.e.t.)	Rennes
Lorient	0–3	Paris Saint-Germain
Valenciennes	2–1	Sochaux
Laval	0–1	Le Mans
Bordeaux	1–2	Metz
Toulouse	3–3 (a.e.t.) (2–4 p)	Caen
Troyes	0–1	Nice
Strasbourg	0–2	Amiens
Nantes	2–3	Monaco

== Round of 16 ==
The matches were played between 30 October and 1 November 2007.

Team 1	Score	Team 2
Nancy	1–0	Amiens
Auxerre	6–2 (a.e.t.)	Nice
Marseille	2–2 (a.e.t.) (5–4 p)	Metz
Monaco	1–2	Lens
Rennes	0–2	Valenciennes
Paris Saint-Germain	2–0	Montpellier
Caen	1–3	Lyon
Niort	0–3	Le Mans

== Final draw ==
Quarter-finals
H	Le Mans	1
A	Lyon	0
H	Lens	3
A	Nancy	0
H	Auxerre	1
A	Marseille	0
H	PSG	4
A	Valenciennes	0

Semi-finals
H	Le Mans	4
A	Lens	5
A	Auxerre	2
H	PSG	3

Final
Lens	1
PSG	2

== Final draw results ==
=== Quarter-finals ===
16 January 2008	Le Mans	1–0	Lyon	Le Mans
	Matsui 29'	(Report)		Stadium: Stade Léon-Bollée; Attendance: 7,934; Referee: Fredy Fautrel

16 January 2008	Lens	3–0	Nancy	Lens
	Demont 16'; Maoulida 44'; Monterrubio 58'	(Report)		Stadium: Stade Félix-Bollaert; Attendance: 18,329; Referee: Lionel Jaffredo

16 January 2008	Auxerre	1–0	Marseille	Auxerre
	Pedretti 90+1'	(Report)		Stadium: Stade de l'Abbé-Deschamps; Attendance: 13,006; Referee: Stéphane Bré

16 January 2008	Paris Saint-Germain	4–0	Valenciennes	Paris
	Pauleta 2'; Diané 54', 60'; Rothen 67'	(Report)		Stadium: Parc des Princes; Attendance: 18,771; Referee: Jean-Charles Cailleux

=== Semi-finals ===
26 February 2008	Paris Saint-Germain	3–2	Auxerre	Paris
	Yepes 31'; Pauleta 43'; Mendy 79'	(Report)	Landreau 75' (o.g.); Quercia 90+3'	Stadium: Parc des Princes; Attendance: 32,198; Referee: Éric Poulat

27 February 2008	Le Mans	4–5	Lens	Le Mans
	Gervinho 22'; Yebda 45'; Matsui 66'; Melo 67'	(Report)	Melo 36' (o.g.); Rémy 45+1'; Dindane 52'; Pelé 64' (o.g.); Keita 117'	Stadium: Stade Léon-Bollée; Attendance: 13,228; Referee: Bertrand Layec

== Final ==
29 March 2008
21:00

Paris Saint-Germain	2–1	Lens
Pauleta 19'; Mendy 90+3'	Report	Carrière 51'

Stade de France, Saint-Denis
Attendance: 78,741
Referee: Laurent Duhamel

== Topscorer ==
Pauleta (6 goals)
