= Zoumana Camara =

French football manager (born 1979)

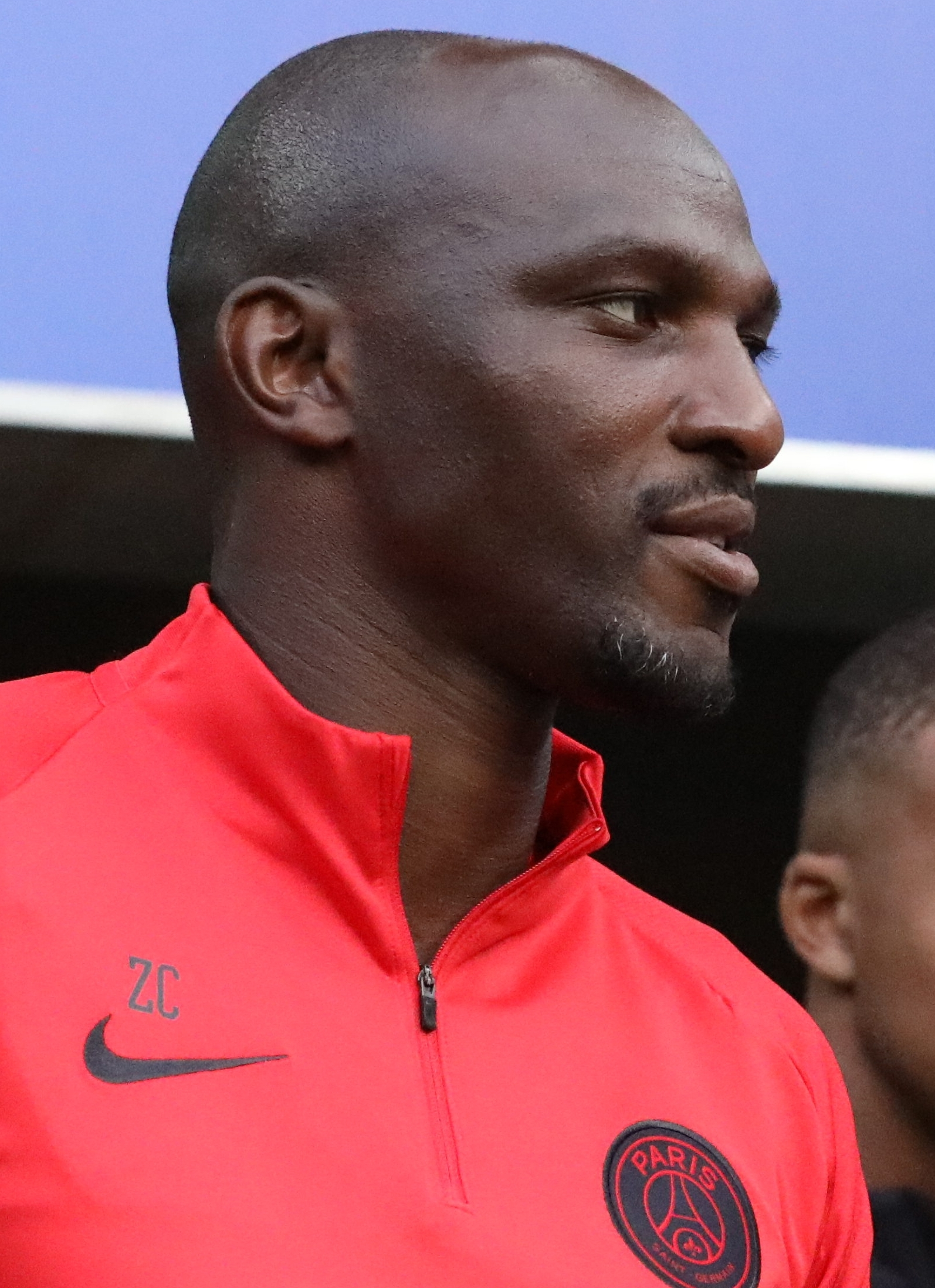
- Camara with Paris Saint-Germain in 2019

Personal information
- Full name: Zoumana Camara
- Date of birth: 3 April 1979 (age 47)
- Place of birth: Colombes, Hauts-de-Seine, France
- Height: 1.82 m (6 ft 0 in)
- Position: Centre-back

Team information
- Current team: Montpellier (manager)

Youth career
- Racing Paris
- Saint-Étienne

Senior career*
Years	Team	Apps	(Gls)
1996–1998	Saint-Étienne	32	(1)
1998–2000	Inter Milan	0	(0)
1999	→ Empoli (loan)	12	(0)
1999–2000	→ Bastia (loan)	27	(1)
2000–2001	Marseille	42	(1)
2002–2004	Lens	14	(0)
2003–2004	→ Leeds United (loan)	13	(1)
2004–2007	Saint-Étienne	108	(0)
2007–2015	Paris Saint-Germain	153	(4)
Total		401	(8)

International career
2001	France	1	(0)

Managerial career
- 2015–2021: Paris Saint-Germain (assistant)
- 2021–2024: Paris Saint-Germain U19
- 2025–: Montpellier
- * Club domestic league appearances and goals

Zoumana Camara (born 3 April 1979) is a French professional football manager and former player who works as the manager of Ligue 2 club Montpellier.

After starting out at Saint-Étienne as a centre-back, he went on to amass Ligue 1 totals of 344 matches and six goals over 15 seasons, representing mainly in the competition Paris Saint-Germain and winning eight major titles with that club. He also had a brief spell in England with Leeds United.

Camara appeared for France at the 2001 Confederations Cup.

== Club career ==
Camara was born in Colombes, Hauts-de-Seine, to Malian parents. He made his professional debut at only 17, appearing in two Ligue 2 seasons with Saint-Étienne. In the summer of 1998 he was purchased by Inter Milan in Italy, but only managed to appear in two Coppa Italia matches with the Nerazzurri, also being loaned twice during his two-year spell: after a five-month stint with Empoli (suffering relegation from Serie A), he spent one season back in his country with Bastia, helping the Corsicans to a 10th-place finish in Ligue 1.

After one and a half seasons with Marseille – one as a starter, the other as backup – Camara joined Lens. He spent the 2003–04 season on loan to English club Leeds United, scoring in a 3–2 away win against Middlesbrough on 30 August 2003 but eventually being relegated from the Premier League. Two months before leaving the Whites he blasted the organisation, claiming he would not have accepted the club's offer had he known about its financial predicament.

Camara returned to Saint-Étienne in the 2004 off-season, only missing six a total of six games for Les Verts over three top-division campaigns. In 2007, he signed a four-year contract with Paris Saint-Germain, being first choice in his first three seasons.

On 12 May 2014, aged 35, Camara signed a new one-year deal with PSG. In June of the following year, after having contributed ten appearances to the conquest of four titles, scoring in a 1–1 league draw at Rennes, he retired from football.

== International career ==
Camara earned his only cap for France on 1 June 2001, at the 2001 FIFA Confederations Cup, starting in the second group stage game against Australia (0–1 loss), with the national team eventually winning the tournament.

== Coaching career ==
After retiring, Camara worked for Paris Saint-Germain as assistant manager. He was in this role under Laurent Blanc, Unai Emery and Thomas Tuchel successively, but left upon the arrival of Mauricio Pochettino in January 2021. He then became a youth academy sports coordinator at the club. For the 2021–22 season, PSG promised Camara a role as a youth team coach. He was eventually confirmed as under-19 head coach on 1 July 2021. In the 2022–23 season, Camara's under-19s finished runners-up in the Championnat National U19, losing in the final to Nantes. In the 2023–24 season, they came out on top, winning the league after beating Auxerre 3–1 in the final. Camara subsequently decided to leave PSG.

On 8 April 2025, Camara signed with Ligue 1 side Montpellier.

== Honours ==
=== Player ===
Paris Saint-Germain

- Ligue 1: 2012–13, 2013–14, 2014–15
- Coupe de France: 2009–10, 2014–15
- Coupe de la Ligue: 2007–08, 2013–14
- Trophée des Champions: 2014

France

- FIFA Confederations Cup: 2001

=== Manager ===
Paris Saint-Germain U19

- Championnat National U19: 2023–24
