= 2010–11 Coupe de la Ligue =

French League Cup

Tournament details
- Country: France
- Dates: 30 July 2010 – 23 April 2011
- Teams: 44

Final positions
- Champions: Marseille (2nd title)
- Runners-up: Montpellier

Tournament statistics
- Matches played: 43
- Goals scored: 113 (2.63 per match)
- Top goal scorer(s): Vincent Aboubakar; Brice Jovial; Hasan Kabze; Frédéric Sammaritano; Grégory Thil (3 goals each)

The 2010–11 Coupe de la Ligue was the 17th edition of the French league cup competition. The defending champions were Marseille, who defeated Bordeaux 3–1 in the 2009–10 edition of the final. The competition was organized by the Ligue de Football Professionnel and was open to the forty-four professional clubs in France that are managed by the organization. The final was contested on 23 April 2011 at the Stade de France. The winner of the competition qualified for the 2011–12 UEFA Europa League and will be inserted into the third qualifying round.

Marseille successfully defended its title after defeating Montpellier 1–0 courtesy of a second half goal from Taye Taiwo in the final. The title resulted in Marseille becoming the first club in Coupe de la Ligue history to repeat as champions.

== News ==
On 20 August 2010, the Ligue de Football Professionnel confirmed that the Coupe de la Ligue would utilize the five-referee system that is currently being used in the UEFA Champions League and the UEFA Europa League. The announcement makes the Coupe de la Ligue the first national cup competition in Europe to adopt the system and was approved by the International Football Association Board (IFAB) on 21 July. The system officially began on 24 August with the start of the second round matches and will be in place until the final in April 2011.

== Calendar ==
Round	First match date	Fixtures	Clubs
First Round	30 July 2010	12	44 → 32
Second Round	24 August 2010	6	32 → 26
Third Round	21 September 2010	10	26 → 16
Round of 16	26 October 2010	8	16 → 8
Quarter-finals	9 November 2010	4	8 → 4
Semi-finals	18 January 2011	2	4 → 2
Final	23 April 2011	1	2 → 1

== First round ==
The draw for the first and second round of the 2010–11 edition of the Coupe de la Ligue was completed on 8 July 2010. The first round featured 24 clubs; the four professional clubs that are currently playing in the Championnat National, the third division of French football, and the 20 clubs that are playing in Ligue 2. The matches were played on 30–31 July. SC Bastia and RC Strasbourg's participation in the competition was initially on hold pending approval from the DNCG, however, once each club met the organization's financial and administrative criteria, they were allowed entrance. Due to the unavailability of Évian's temporary stadium, Parc des Sports, the Évian–Strasbourg match was moved to the Stade de la Meinau in Strasbourg.

30 July 2010	Angers	2–2 (a.e.t.) (2–4 p)	Bastia	Angers
20:00 CEST	Keseru 85'; Henin 45'	Report	Moizini 46'; Khazri 47'	Stadium: Stade Jean Bouin; Attendance: 4,357; Referee: Cédric Cotrel (Picardie)
	Penalties
	Gillet (penalty scored); De Freitas (penalty missed); Diers (penalty missed); Stéphan (penalty scored)		Diallo (penalty scored); Robail (penalty scored); Choplin (penalty scored); Barthelemy (penalty scored)

30 July 2010	Strasbourg	2–2 (a.e.t.) (4–5 p)	Évian	Strasbourg
20:00 CEST	Mathlouthi 18'; Sikimić 95'	Report	Adnane 12' (pen.); Pouye 112'	Stadium: Stade de la Meinau; Attendance: 4,187; Referee: Abdelali Chaoui (Languedoc-Roussillon)
	Penalties
	Damour (penalty scored); Fanchone (penalty scored); Bah (penalty scored); Mathlouthi (penalty scored); Correia (penalty missed)		Bouby (penalty scored); Bugnet (penalty scored); Bérigaud (penalty scored); Dja Djedje (penalty scored); Cambon (penalty scored)

30 July 2010	Grenoble	1–2	Guingamp	Grenoble
20:00 CEST	Tinhan 85'	Report	Knockeart 66'; Bazile 69'	Stadium: Stade des Alpes; Attendance: 2,758; Referee: Olivier Husset (Centre)

30 July 2010	Clermont	3–1	Metz	Clermont-Ferrand
20:00 CEST	Alessandrini 53'; Privat 65'; Bayod 75'	Report	Gestede 35'	Stadium: Stade Gabriel Montpied; Attendance: 2,326; Referee: Sébastien Desiage (Rhône-Alpes)

30 July 2010	Dijon	1–2	Amiens	Dijon
20:00 CEST	Isabey 106'	Report	Atlan 114'; Steppé 116'	Stadium: Stade Gaston Gérard; Attendance: 2,458; Referee: Stéphane Djouzi (Méditerranée)

30 July 2010	Troyes	1–1 (a.e.t.) (5–6 p)	Reims	Troyes
20:00 CEST	Jarjat 79'	Report	Gamiette 72'	Stadium: Stade de l'Aube; Attendance: 4,758; Referee: Amaury Delerue (Aquitaine)
	Penalties
	Carlier (penalty scored); Faussurier (penalty scored); Marcos (penalty scored); Obbadi (penalty scored); Keita (penalty scored); Sissoko (penalty scored); Bettiol (penalty missed)		Krychowiak (penalty scored); Gamiette (penalty scored); Fauré (penalty scored); Gamboa (penalty scored); Barbier (penalty scored); Weber (penalty missed); Amalfitano (penalty scored)

30 July 2010	Tours	1–2	Vannes	Tours
20:00 CEST	Buengo 90'	Report	Reset 37'; Sammaritano 88'	Stadium: Stade de la Vallée du Cher; Attendance: 4,242; Referee: Dominique Julien (Basse-Normandie)

30 July 2010	Ajaccio	4–0	Istres	Ajaccio
20:00 CEST	Rivière 19', 73'; Socrier 85'; Kinkela 90'	Report		Stadium: Stade François Coty; Attendance: 1,127; Referee: Ludovic Remy (Nord-Pas-de-Calais)

30 July 2010	Le Havre	2–1 (a.e.t.)	Le Mans	Le Havre
20:00 CEST	Adénon 64' (o.g.); Jovial 103'	Report	Cissé 11'	Stadium: Stade Jules Deschaseaux; Attendance: 4,380; Referee: William Lavis (Méditerranée)

30 July 2010	Laval	3–2 (a.e.t.)	Châteauroux	Laval
20:00 CEST	Lebouc 12'; Gimbert 82', 118'	Report	Haddad 22', 45'	Stadium: Stade Francis Le Basser; Attendance: 3,769; Referee: Christian Guillard (Atlantique)

30 July 2010	Sedan	0–0 (a.e.t.) (4–5 p)	Nîmes	Sedan
20:00 CEST		Report		Stadium: Stade Louis Dugauguez; Attendance: 4,681; Referee: Florent Batta (Méditerranée)
	Penalties
	Tibéri (penalty scored); Abdallah (penalty scored); Smrekar (penalty scored); Mokaké (penalty scored); Valdivia (penalty missed)		Stošić (penalty scored); Zarabi (penalty scored); Moukandjo (penalty scored); Mostefa (penalty scored); Cavalli (penalty scored)

31 July 2010	Boulogne	2–2 (a.e.t.) (4–2 p)	Nantes	Boulogne-sur-Mer
15:00 CEST	Thil 79', 114'	Report	Zerka 71'; Ba 102'	Stadium: Stade de la Libération; Attendance: 3,335; Referee: Didier Falcone (Méditerranée)
	Penalties
	Agouazi (penalty scored); Blayac (penalty scored); Touré (penalty scored); Rabuel (penalty scored)		Cheyrou (penalty scored); Đorđević (penalty missed); Zerka (penalty missed); Martins Pereira (penalty scored)

Source: Ligue de Football Professionnel

== Second round ==
The draw for the second round of the 2010–11 edition of the Coupe de la Ligue was held on 2 August 2010. The second round featured the 12 winning teams from the first round. The matches were played on 24 August.

24 August 2010	Clermont	2–3	Boulogne	Clermont-Ferrand
20:00 CET	Haquin 33'; Chaussidière 59'	Report	Bessat 39'; Ducatel 53'; Thil 90'	Stadium: Stade Gabriel Montpied; Attendance: 2,085; Referee: Florent Batta (Méditerranée)

24 August 2010	Ajaccio	0–0 (a.e.t.) (4–2 p)	Vannes	Ajaccio
20:00 CET		Report		Stadium: Stade François Coty; Attendance: 1,222; Referee: Benoît Bastien (Lorraine)
	Penalties
	Medjani (penalty scored); Begeorgi (penalty scored); Lippini (penalty scored); Socrier (penalty scored)		Hervé (penalty scored); Diguiny (penalty missed); Cantini (penalty scored); Faivre (penalty missed)

24 August 2010	Amiens	0–0 (a.e.t.) (3–4 p)	Bastia	Amiens
20:00 CET		Report		Stadium: Stade de la Licorne; Attendance: 2,668; Referee: Benoît Millot (Île-de-France)
	Penalties
	Cirilli (penalty scored); Mienniel (penalty scored); Djaballah (penalty scored); Zobiri (penalty missed); Atlan (penalty missed)		Suarez (penalty scored); Moizini (penalty scored); Robail (penalty scored); Khazri (penalty scored)

24 August 2010	Nîmes	2–0	Laval	Nîmes
20:00 CET	Ayité 5'; Haguy 60'	Report		Stadium: Stade des Costières; Attendance: 3,876; Referee: Mikael Lesage (Basse-Normandie)

24 August 2010	Guingamp	3–2 (a.e.t.)	Évian	Guingamp
20:00 CET	Cambon 23' (o.g.); Hamroun 90'; Giresse 117'	Report	Farina 18'; Bouby 82'	Stadium: Stade du Roudourou; Attendance: 4,927; Referee: Yohann Rouinsard (Île-de-France)

24 August 2010	Reims	0–2	Le Havre	Reims
20:45 CET		Report	Jovial 33', 47'	Stadium: Stade Auguste-Delaune II; Attendance: 4,344; Referee: Ludovic Remy (Nord-Pas de Calais)

Source: Ligue de Football Professionnel

== Third round ==
The draw for the third round of the 2010–11 edition of the Coupe de la Ligue was held on 30 August 2010. The third round featured the six winning teams from the second round and the 14 teams from Ligue 1 who didn't qualify for European competition this season. The matches were played on 21–22 September 2010.

21 September 2010	Nîmes	1–1 (a.e.t.) (4–5 p)	Valenciennes	Nîmes
20:00 CET	Ayité 39'	Report	Cohade 90+5'	Stadium: Stade des Costières; Attendance: 5,062; Referee: Alexandre Castro (Rhône-Alpes)
	Penalties
	Mostefa (penalty scored); Poulain (penalty scored); Gigliotti (penalty scored); Cavalli (penalty scored); Zarabi (penalty missed)		Ducourtioux (penalty scored); Cohade (penalty scored); Danic (penalty scored); Samassa (penalty scored); Penneteau (penalty scored)

21 September 2010	Ajaccio	3–0	Le Havre	Ajaccio
20:00 CET	Delort 32', 65'; Kinkela 82'	Report		Stadium: Stade François Coty; Attendance: 1,476; Referee: Tony Chapron (Rhône-Alpes)

21 September 2010	Lorient	1–0	Brest	Lorient
20:45 CET	Kitambala 45'	Report		Stadium: Stade du Moustoir; Attendance: 11,309; Referee: Stéphane Lannoy (Nord-Pas-de-Calais)

22 September 2010	Monaco	1–0	Lens	Fontvieille
18:00 CET	Nicalue 83' (pen.)	Report		Stadium: Stade Louis II; Attendance: 4,661; Referee: Jean-Charles Cailleux (Picardy)

22 September 2010	Nancy	1–2	Bordeaux	Tomblaine
20:45 CET	Diakité 61'	Report	Bellion 11'; Modeste 70'	Stadium: Stade Marcel Picot; Attendance: 14,605; Referee: Bruno Coue (Méditerranée)

22 September 2010	Saint-Étienne	2–0	Nice	Saint-Étienne
20:45 CET	Landrin 14'; Bergessio 39'	Report		Stadium: Stade Geoffroy-Guichard; Attendance: 13,468; Referee: Sébastien Moreira (Franche-Comté)

22 September 2010	Arles-Avignon	0–1	Caen	Avignon
20:45 CET		Report	Traoré 76'	Stadium: Parc des Sports; Attendance: 4,357; Referee: Wilfried Bien (Rhône-Alpes)

22 September 2010	Boulogne	2–1 (a.e.t.)	Toulouse	Boulogne-sur-Mer
20:45 CET	Lorca 30'; Atik 114' (pen.)	Report	Sissoko 76'	Stadium: Stade de la Libération; Attendance: 3,931; Referee: Bartolomeu Varela (Brittany)

22 September 2010	Sochaux	0–2	Bastia	Montbéliard
20:45 CET		Report	Suarez 24'; Sans 52'	Stadium: Stade Auguste Bonal; Attendance: 5,750; Referee: Olivier Thual (Aquitaine)

22 September 2010	Guingamp	3–1	Rennes	Guingamp
20:45 CET	Knockaert 25'; Soly 58'; Diallo 84'	Report	Ekoko 4'	Stadium: Stade du Roudourou; Attendance: 7,828; Referee: Fredy Fautrel (Basse-Normandie)

Source: Ligue de Football Professionnel

== Round of 16 ==
The draw for the Round of 16 of the 2010–11 edition of the Coupe de la Ligue was held on 28 September 2010. The round featured the ten winning teams from the third round and the six teams that qualified for European competition in the 2009–10 season. The matches were played on 26–27 October.

26 October 2010	Montpellier	2–0	Ajaccio	Montpellier
20:00 CET	Kabze 32'; Koita 89'	Report		Stadium: Stade de la Mosson; Attendance: 6,616; Referee: Stéphane Lannoy (Nord-Pas-de-Calais)

26 October 2010	Valenciennes	4–0	Boulogne	Valenciennes
20:00 CET	Aboubakar 11', 65', 84'; Bong 37'	Report		Stadium: Stade Nungesser; Attendance: 7,378; Referee: Saïd Ennjimi (Centre Ouest)

26 October 2010	Monaco	1–1 (a.e.t.) (5–3 p)	Lorient	Fontvieille
20:00 CET	Hansson 99'	Report	Diarra 118'	Stadium: Stade Louis II; Attendance: 4,889; Referee: Tony Chapron (Rhône-Alpes)
	Penalties
	Park (penalty scored); Gakpé (penalty scored); Mongongu (penalty scored); Coutadeur (penalty scored); Mbokani (penalty scored)		Le Lan (penalty missed); Monnet-Paquet (penalty scored); Gameiro (penalty scored); Amalfitano (penalty scored)

26 October 2010	Saint-Étienne	1–0	Bordeaux	Saint-Étienne
20:45 CET	N'Daw 11'	Report		Stadium: Stade Geoffroy-Guichard; Attendance: 24,841; Referee: Lionel Jaffredo (Brittany)

27 October 2010	Guingamp	0–1	Marseille	Guingamp
17:00 CET		Report	A. Ayew 42'	Stadium: Stade du Roudourou; Attendance: 17,037; Referee: Laurent Duhamel (Upper Normandy)

27 October 2010	Lille	4–1	Caen	Villeneuve-d'Ascq
18:45 CET	Cabaye 7', 44'; Gervinho 53'; Hazard 74'	Report	Yatabaré 13'	Stadium: Stadium Lille Métropole; Attendance: 9,685; Referee: Philippe Malige (Languedoc-Roussillon

27 October 2010	Auxerre	4–0	Bastia	Auxerre
20:00 CET	Quercia 8'; Sammaritano 25', 79'; Hengbart 68'	Report		Stadium: Stade de l'Abbé-Deschamps; Attendance: 7,557; Referee: Antony Gautier (Nord-Pas-de-Calais)

27 October 2010	Lyon	1–2 (a.e.t.)	Paris Saint-Germain	Lyon
20:45 CET	Briand 39'	Report	Bodmer 88'; Giuly 101'	Stadium: Stade de Gerland; Attendance: 26,587; Referee: Ruddy Buquet (Picardy)

Source: Ligue de Football Professionnel

== Quarter-finals ==
9 November 2010	Auxerre	2–0	Saint-Étienne	Auxerre
20:45 CET	Pedretti 16' (pen.); Dudka 48' (pen.)	Report		Stadium: Stade de l'Abbé-Deschamps; Attendance: 7,906; Referee: Damien Ledentu (Languedoc-Roussillon)

10 November 2010	Valenciennes	1–3	Paris Saint-Germain	Valenciennes
17:00 CET	Dossevi 3'	Report	Camara 9'; Jallet 26'; Luyindula 51'	Stadium: Stade Nungesser; Attendance: 7,395; Referee: Stéphane Bré (Brittany)

10 November 2010	Montpellier	2–1	Lille	Montpellier
18:45 CET	Kabze 27', 52'	Report	Hazard 67'	Stadium: Stade de la Mosson; Attendance: 5,764; Referee: Olivier Thual (Aquitaine)

10 November 2010	Marseille	2–1	Monaco	Marseille
20:45 CET	A. Ayew 42'; Azpilicueta 60'	Report	Coutadeur 22' (pen.)	Stadium: Stade Vélodrome; Attendance: 17,765; Referee: Clément Turpin (Bourgogne)

== Semi-finals ==
18 January 2011	Montpellier	1–0 (a.e.t.)	Paris Saint-Germain	Montpellier
20:45 CET	Giroud 118'	Report		Stadium: Stade de la Mosson; Attendance: 17,641; Referee: Saïd Ennjimi (Centre-Ouest)

19 January 2011	Auxerre	0–2	Marseille	Auxerre
20:45 CET		Report	Brandão 45+2'; Gignac 68'	Stadium: Stade de l'Abbé-Deschamps; Attendance: 17,025; Referee: Laurent Duhamel (Normandie)

== Final ==
23 April 2011
20:45 CEST

Marseille	1–0	Montpellier
Taiwo 80'	Report

Stade de France, Saint-Denis
Attendance: 78,511
Referee: Antony Gautier (Nord-Pas-de-Calais)

== Statistics ==
=== Top goalscorers ===
Rank	Name	Team	Goals	Appearances	Minutes played
1	(France) Brice Jovial	Le Havre	3	3	145'
1	(Turkey) Hasan Kabze	Montpellier	3	2	166'
1	(France) Frédéric Sammaritano	Auxerre	3	3	246'
1	(Cameroon) Vincent Aboubakar	Valenciennes	3	2	159'
1	(France) Grégory Thil	Boulogne-sur-Mer	3	3	186'
6	(Ghana) André Ayew	Marseille	2	3	346'
6	(Togo) Jonathan Ayité	Nîmes	2	3	230'
6	(France) Anthony Knockaert	Guingamp	2	4	306'
6	(Democratic Republic of the Congo) Christian Kinkela	Ajaccio	2	4	337'
6	(Algeria) Jugurtha Hamroun	Guingamp	2	2	97'

Note: Players marked in bold are still playing in the competition.

== See also ==
- 2010–11 Ligue 1
- 2010–11 Ligue 2
- 2010–11 Championnat National
