= 2010–11 AC Ajaccio season =

AC Ajaccio
2010–11 season
- Chairman: Alain Orsoni
- Manager: Olivier Pantaloni
- Stadium: Stade François Coty
- Ligue 2: 2nd (promoted)
- Coupe de France: Eighth round
- Coupe de la Ligue: Round of 16
- Top goalscorer: League: Jean-François Rivière; Richard Socrier (12 each); All: Jean-François Rivière (14)
Home colours	Away colours

The 2010–11 season was the 101st season in the existence of AC Ajaccio and the club's fifth consecutive season in the top flight of French football. In addition to the domestic league, Ajaccio participated in this season's edition of the Coupe de France and the Coupe de la Ligue.

== Players ==
=== First-team squad ===
Note: Flags indicate national team as defined under FIFA eligibility rules; some limited exceptions apply. Players may hold more than one non-FIFA nationality.

No.	Pos.	Nation	Player
1	GK	FRA	Thierry Debès
6	MF	ALG	Carl Medjani
7	FW	FRA	Julien Viale
8	MF	FRA	Jean-Baptiste Pierazzi
9	FW	FRA	Andy Delort
10	MF	COD	Christian Kinkela
11	MF	FRA	Karim El Hany
12	DF	FRA	Billy Modeste
13	MF	FRA	Fabrice Begeorgi
14	FW	FRA	Jean-François Rivière
16	GK	FRA	Laurent Bernardi

No.	Pos.	Nation	Player
17	DF	FRA	Yoann Poulard
18	MF	FRA	Johan Cavalli
19	MF	FRA	Paul Lasne (on loan from Bordeaux)
20	DF	FRA	Anthony Lippini
21	FW	FRA	Richard Socrier
22	DF	MLI	Fousseni Diawara
23	DF	FRA	Arnaud Maire
24	MF	FRA	Benjamin André
27	DF	FRA	Rémi Cilia
28	FW	FRA	Toufik Guerabis
30	GK	FRA	David Oberhauser

== Pre-season and friendlies ==
Win Draw Loss

== Competitions ==
=== Overall record ===
Competition	First match	Last match	Starting round	Final position	Record							
Competition	First match	Last match	Starting round	Final position	Pld	W	D	L	GF	GA	GD	Win %
Ligue 2	6 August 2010	27 May 2011	Matchday 1	2nd	38	17	13	8	45	37	+8	44.74
Coupe de France	20 November 2010	11 December 2010	Seventh round	Eighth round	2	1	0	1	4	2	+2	50.00
Coupe de la Ligue	30 July 2010	26 October 2010	First round	Round of 16	4	2	1	1	7	2	+5	50.00
Total					44	20	14	10	56	41	+15	45.45

Source: Soccerway

=== Ligue 2 ===
==== League table ====
Pos	Team	Pld	W	D	L	GF	GA	GD	Pts	Promotion or Relegation
1	Évian (C, P)	38	18	13	7	63	41	+22	67	Promotion to Ligue 1
2	Ajaccio (P)	38	17	13	8	45	37	+8	64	Promotion to Ligue 1
3	Dijon (P)	38	17	11	10	55	40	+15	62	Promotion to Ligue 1
4	Le Mans	38	17	11	10	48	37	+11	62	
5	Sedan	38	15	14	9	57	37	+20	59	

Source: Ligue 2
Rules for classification: 1) points; 2) goal difference; 3) number of goals scored.
(C) Champions; (P) Promoted

==== Results summary ====
Overall								Home						Away					
Pld	W	D	L	GF	GA	GD	Pts	W	D	L	GF	GA	GD	W	D	L	GF	GA	GD
38	17	13	8	45	37	+8	64	13	5	1	27	6	+21	4	8	7	18	31	−13

Source: Ligue 2

==== Results by round ====
Round	1	2	3	4	5	6	7	8	9	10	11	12	13	14	15	16	17	18	19	20	21	22	23	24	25	26	27	28	29	30	31	32	33	34	35	36	37	38
Ground	H	A	H	A	H	A	H	A	H	A	A	H	A	H	A	H	A	H	A	H	A	H	A	H	A	H	A	H	H	A	H	A	H	A	H	A	H	A
Result	W	L	D	L	D	D	W	D	L	D	W	W	D	W	L	W	L	W	D	W	L	W	D	W	W	D	L	W	D	D	W	D	D	W	W	L	W	W
Position	6	10	11	16	16	17	10	12	14	15	11	9	10	9	9	8	9	6	7	4	5	4	5	4	2	3	4	1	2	3	2	2	3	3	3	4	3	2

Source: Ligue 2
A = Away; H = Home; W = Win; D = Draw; L = Loss

==== Matches ====
6 August 2010 1	Ajaccio	1–0	Nîmes

13 August 2010 2	Le Havre	2–0	Ajaccio

17 August 2010 3	Ajaccio	0–0	Le Mans

20 August 2010 4	Troyes	3–0	Ajaccio

27 August 2010 5	Ajaccio	0–0	Metz

13 September 2010 6	Évian	1–1	Ajaccio

17 September 2010 7	Ajaccio	3–0	Vannes

24 September 2010 8	Laval	0–0	Ajaccio

1 October 2010 9	Ajaccio	2–3	Nantes

15 October 2010 10	Reims	1–1	Ajaccio

19 October 2010 11	Châteauroux	1–2	Ajaccio

22 October 2010 12	Ajaccio	2–0	Tours

29 October 2010 13	Grenoble	1–1	Ajaccio

5 November 2010 14	Ajaccio	1–0	Dijon

15 November 2010 15	Sedan	4–1	Ajaccio

26 November 2010 16	Ajaccio	2–0	Boulogne

7 December 2010 17	Clermont	2–0	Ajaccio

17 December 2010 18	Ajaccio	1–0	Angers

21 December 2010 19	Istres	2–2	Ajaccio

15 January 2011 20	Ajaccio	2–1	Le Havre

29 January 2011 21	Le Mans	3–0	Ajaccio

5 February 2011 22	Ajaccio	3–0	Troyes

14 February 2011 23	Metz	2–2	Ajaccio

18 February 2011 24	Ajaccio	1–0	Évian

25 February 2011 25	Vannes	0–1	Ajaccio

4 March 2011 26	Ajaccio	1–1	Laval

11 March 2011 27	Nantes	2–0	Ajaccio

18 March 2011 28	Ajaccio	3–0	Reims

1 April 2011 29	Ajaccio	1–1	Châteauroux

11 April 2011 30	Tours	2–2	Ajaccio

15 April 2011 31	Ajaccio	1–0	Grenoble

25 April 2011 32	Dijon	1–1	Ajaccio

29 April 2011 33	Ajaccio	0–0	Sedan

6 May 2011 34	Boulogne	0–1	Ajaccio

10 May 2011 35	Ajaccio	1–0	Clermont

13 May 2011 36	Angers	3–1	Ajaccio

20 May 2011 37	Ajaccio	2–0	Istres

27 May 2011 38	Nîmes	1–2	Ajaccio

=== Coupe de France ===
20 November 2010 Seventh round	Côte-Chaude	0–3	Ajaccio	Saint-Étienne
			Delort 10' (pen.), 90+3'; El Hany 23'	Stadium: Stade de l’Etivallière; Attendance: 2,500; Referee: Laurent Batta

11 December 2010 Eighth round	Cannes	2–1 (a.e.t.)	Ajaccio	Cannes
				Stadium: Stade Pierre de Coubertin

=== Coupe de la Ligue ===
30 July 2010 First round	Ajaccio	4–0	Istres	Ajaccio
20:00 CEST	Rivière 19', 73'; Socrier 85'; Kinkela 90'	Report		Stadium: Stade François Coty; Attendance: 1,127; Referee: Ludovic Remy (Nord-Pas-de-Calais)

24 August 2010 Second round	Ajaccio	0–0 (a.e.t.) (4–2 p)	Vannes	Ajaccio
20:00 CET		Report		Stadium: Stade François Coty; Attendance: 1,222; Referee: Benoît Bastien (Lorraine)
	Penalties
	Medjani (penalty scored); Begeorgi (penalty scored); Lippini (penalty scored); Socrier (penalty scored)		(penalty scored) Hervé; (penalty missed) Diguiny; (penalty scored) Cantini; (penalty missed) Faivre

21 September 2010 Third round	Ajaccio	3–0	Le Havre	Ajaccio
20:00 CET	Delort 32', 65'; Kinkela 82'	Report		Stadium: Stade François Coty; Attendance: 1,476; Referee: Tony Chapron (Rhône-Alpes)

26 October 2010 Round of 16	Montpellier	2–0	Ajaccio	Montpellier
20:00 CET	Kabze 32'; Koita 89'	Report		Stadium: Stade de la Mosson; Attendance: 6,616; Referee: Stéphane Lannoy (Nord-Pas-de-Calais)
