= 2010–11 Paris Saint-Germain FC season =

38th season in existence of Paris Saint-Germain

Paris Saint-Germain
2010–11 season
- President: Robin Leproux
- Head coach: Antoine Kombouaré
- Stadium: Parc des Princes
- Ligue 1: 4th
- Coupe de France: Runners-up
- Coupe de la Ligue: Semi-finals
- Trophée des Champions: Runners-up
- UEFA Europa League: Round of 16
- Top goalscorer: League: Nenê (14); All: Nenê (20); Guillaume Hoarau (20)
- Highest home attendance: 40,404 vs Lille (21 May 2011)
- Lowest home attendance: 8,500 vs Maccabi Tel Aviv (19 August 2010)
- Average home league attendance: 29,302
Home colours	Away colours	Third colours

The 2010–11 season was French football club Paris Saint-Germain's 38th professional season, their 38th season in Ligue 1 and their 37th consecutive season in French top-flight. PSG was coached by Antoine Kombouaré. The club was presided by Robin Leproux. PSG was present in the Ligue 1, the Coupe de France, the Coupe de la Ligue and the UEFA Europa League. PSG's average home gate was 29,317, the fourth highest in Ligue 1.

After a season marked by the violence between the fans and poor results from the team, Paris Saint-Germain started the season with the prospect of regaining success and stability. The club management presented the key measures of the anti-violence which intended to pacify the Parc des Princes. By the name "Tous PSG", many celebrities, such as former player Nicolas Anelka, attended and committed to the call of the club on the occasion of its 40 years. Paris Saint-Germain maintained the services of key players such as Claude Makélélé, Guillaume Hoarau, Stéphane Sessègnon and Mevlüt Erdinç, as well as adding Mathieu Bodmer and Nenê to their player pool. Robin Leproux had pretty high ambitions and declared that PSG was on the course to become more competitive. He expected the capital club to finish between the first four in the league and to pull something off in the Europa League:

We announced late last season that we wanted to make the team more competitive. It was planned to recruit a player of great value. The arrival of Mathieu Bodmer was the first strong sign, and that of Nenê is another. We continue to work to recruit quickly and have a full team for Le Championnat and other competitions, including in Europe.

— Robin Leproux, 12 July 2010

== News ==
Robin Leproux announced the main measures of "Tous PSG", an anti-violence plan to pacify the Parc des Princes: removal of subscriptions, random distribution of seats and fully supervision by the club over the fans. It was a powerful measure by the club which intended to finally turn a page in their history, often punctuated by serious incidents due to the increasing antagonism between supporters of Auteuil and Boulogne. Assistant coach Yves Bertucci and physical trainer Raphaël Fèvre were handed a one-year extension. Goalkeeping coach Nicolas Dehon left for Marseille and Gilles Bourges replaced him. Claude Makélélé postponed plans to retire and instead signed a new one-year contract extension with PSG. The friendly match between PSG and Mechelen took place behind closed doors at the Camp des Loges. The towns of Arras and Le Touquet refused to host the friendly match due to the people's fear towards PSG fans.

Paris Saint-Germain were plunged into controversy following forgery allegations against goalkeeper Apoula Edel. Sevilla lodged a formal complaint to UEFA after former Cameroon coach Nicolas Philibert declared that 24-year-old Apoula Edel was instead a 29-year-old named Ambroise Beyama. If the allegations were proved true and the player was found guilty, he could be sentenced to prison. Meanwhile, if false documents were lodged with the game's French and European governing bodies, Paris Saint-Germain risked losing their last two wins against Sevilla and Arles-Avignon. They could also face expulsion from the European competition, demotion from the top tier of French football and heavy fines. Paris Saint-Germain, in partnership with Goom Radio, officially launched their own numerical radio station, the first ever dedicated to a Ligue 1 football club, which is also available over the internet. Edel was acquitted of possessing fake documents by the French police as his passport was found to be genuine. As a result, UEFA rejected Sevilla's appeal to have their Europa League defeat to Paris Saint-Germain overturned.

The LFP decided to close the visiting stand to followers at the Ligue 1 matches between Paris Saint-Germain and Marseille. The measure was designed to ensure the security after the serious incidents of recent seasons. Clément Chantôme was named Player of the Month for November by the UNFP with 51% of the votes. Nenê and Robin Leproux were respectively elected Foreign Player of the Year and President of the Year by France Football. The second phase of "Tous PSG" was implemented. Free subscriptions returned but the random distribution of seats was maintained. The new measures also allowed the creation of supporter associations signatories to the "Charte 12" peace treaty. Antoine Kombouaré was elected Manager of the Year by France 3. Nenê was named Player of the Month for December by the UNFP with 62% of the votes. The LFP sanctioned Paris Saint-Germain and AS Monaco following the use of a match ball which was not the "snow" version of the official Ligue 1 ball. Mamadou Sakho extended his contract with PSG until 2014. Clément Chantôme extended his current deal with the club until 2015. Christophe Jallet inked a contract extension until 2015. Antoine Kombouaré penned a contract extension that saw him link to the Parc des Princes club for a further 12 months.

Mamadou Sakho was named "Player of the Month" for April by the UNFP with 45% of the votes. Mamadou Sakho confirmed his continuing ascendancy in the French game by collecting the coveted Ligue 1 Young Player of the Year award. Sakho and Nenê appeared in the Ligue 1 All-star XI, while Pauleta was included in the All-Star XI of the past 20 years. The LFP announced the classification of training centers for the 2010–11 season. Paris Saint-Germain earned 417 points thanks largely to their double coronation as U-19 and U-17 French champions. The capital club appeared in the top ten, being ranked in ninth position just behind Lyon. Once again, Rennes occupied the top spot with a fairly consistent lead. The FFF announced the classification of professional youth clubs for the 2010–11 season. Paris Saint-Germain earned 421 points and was ranked the best professional youth club in recognition to their unprecedented and historic double.

== Transfers ==
In

No.	Pos.	Nat.	Name	Age	EU	Moving from	Type	Transfer window	Ends	Transfer fee	Source
16	GK	(France)	Alphonse Areola	17	EU	Youth system	Promoted	Summer	2012		All PSG
31	AM	(Mali)	Adama Touré	19	Non-EU	Youth system	Promoted	Summer			All PSG
—	AM	(France)	Abdallah Yaisien	16	EU	Youth system	Signed pro	Summer	2012		PSG.fr
25	LM	(France)	Jérôme Rothen	32	EU	MKE Ankaragücü (Turkey)	Loan return	Summer	2011		Ligue 1
18	FW	(France)	Loris Arnaud	23	EU	Clermont	Loan return	Summer	2012		
12	CM	(France)	Mathieu Bodmer	27	EU	Lyon	Signed	Summer	2013	€2.5M	Ligue 1
19	LW	(Brazil)	Nenê	29	EU	Monaco	Signed	Summer	2013	€5.5M	Ligue 1
5	LB	(Ivory Coast)	Siaka Tiéné	28	EU	Valenciennes	Signed	Summer	2013	€1M	Ligue 1
—	FW	(Brazil)	Éverton Santos	24	Non-EU	Goiás (Brazil)	Loan return	Winter	2012		Foot Mercato
—	FW	(Brazil)	Éverton Santos	24	Non-EU	Ponte Preta (Brazil)	Loan return	Winter	2012		Globo Esporte
37	FW	(France)	Jean-Christophe Bahebeck	17	EU	Youth system	Promoted	Winter			PSG.fr
38	AM	(France)	Neeskens Kebano	18	EU	Youth system	Promoted	Winter			PSG.fr

Total spending: ▼€9 million

Out

No.	Pos.	Nat.	Name	Age	EU	Moving to	Type	Transfer window	Transfer fee	Source
16	GK	(France)	Willy Grondin	35	EU		Contract ended	Summer		LMD PSG
17	DM	(France)	Granddi Ngoyi	22	EU	Brest	Loaned	Summer		PSG.fr
12	DM	(Cameroon)	Albert Baning	25	Non-EU	Maccabi Tel Aviv (Israel)	Contract ended	Summer	Free	All PSG
28	FW	(France)	Maxime Partouche	22	EU	Panionios (Greece)	Contract ended	Summer	Free	Planete PSG
29	AM	(France)	Abdelaziz Barrada	21	EU	Getafe	Contract ended	Summer	Free	Espoirs du Football
18	FW	(France)	Loris Arnaud	23	EU	Angers	Loaned	Summer		PSG.fr
27	FW	(France)	Younousse Sankharé	20	EU	Dijon	Loaned	Summer		PSG.fr
25	LM	(France)	Jérôme Rothen	32	EU	Bastia	Contract terminated	Winter	Free	ESPN
14	FW	(Serbia)	Mateja Kežman	31	Non-EU	South China (Hong Kong)	Contract terminated	Winter	Free	Goal.com
10	AM	(Benin)	Stéphane Sessègnon	26	Non-EU	Sunderland (England)	Transferred	Winter	€7M	Sky Sports
—	FW	(Brazil)	Éverton Santos	24	Non-EU	Ponte Preta (Brazil)	Loaned	Winter		Foot Mercato
—	FW	(Brazil)	Éverton Santos	24	Non-EU	Seongnam Ilhwa Chunma (South Korea)	Loaned	Winter		PSG MAG

Total income: ▲€7 million

== Squad information ==
N	Pos.	Nat.	Name	Age	EU	Since	App	Goals	Ends	Transfer fee	Notes
1	GK	(France)	Grégory Coupet	38	EU	2009	17	0	2011	€1M	
2	RB	(Brazil)	Ceará	30	Non-EU	2007	80	1	2012	€2.5M	
3	CB	(France)	Mamadou Sakho	21	EU	2006	91	1	2014	Youth system	
4	DM	(France)	Claude Makélélé (Note: Makélélé was born in Kinshasa, Zaire (now the Democratic Republic of the Congo), but was raised in France from the age of 4 and made his international debut for France in July 1995.) (captain)	38	EU	2008	76	1	2011	Free	
5	LB	(Ivory Coast)	Siaka Tiéné	29	EU	2010	0	0	2013	€1M	
6	CB	(France)	Zoumana Camara	32	EU	2007	128	1	2012	€6M	
7	RW	(France)	Ludovic Giuly	34	EU	2008	80	13	2011	€2.5M	
8	FW	(France)	Peguy Luyindula (Note: Luyindula was born in Kinshasa, Zaire (now the Democratic Republic of the Congo), but also qualified to represent France internationally and represented France at U-21 level before making his international debut for France in 2004.)	32	EU	2006	138	29	2012	€2.5M	
9	FW	(France)	Guillaume Hoarau	27	EU	2008	75	28	2013	€0.5M	
10	AM	(Benin)	Stéphane Sessègnon	26	Non-EU	2008	82	10	2013	€8M	
11	FW	(Turkey)	Mevlüt Erdinç (Note: Erdinç was born in Saint-Claude, France, but also qualified to represent Turkey internationally through his parents and represented France at U-17 level and Turkey at U-19 and U-21 level before making his international debut for Turkey in March 2008.)	24	EU	2009	37	19	2013	€9M	
12	CM	(France)	Mathieu Bodmer	28	EU	2010	0	0	2013	€2.5M	
13	CB	(Mali)	Sammy Traoré (Note: Traoré was born in Créteil, France, but also qualified to represent Mali internationally and made his international debut for Mali in 2001.)	35	EU	2006	88	4	2011	€1.5M	
14	FW	(Serbia)	Mateja Kežman	32	EU	2008	50	10	2011	€3.7M	
16	GK	(France)	Alphonse Areola	18	EU	2010	0	0	2012	Youth system	
18	FW	(France)	Loris Arnaud	24	EU	2007	30	4	2012	Youth system	
19	LW	(Brazil)	Nenê	29	EU	2010	0	0	2013	€5.5M	
20	CM	(France)	Clément Chantôme	23	EU	2006	133	5	2015	Youth system	
21	FW	(Haiti)	Jean-Eudes Maurice (Note: Maurice was born in Alfortville, France, but also qualified to represent Haiti internationally and made his international debut for Haiti in 2011.)	24	EU	2008	29	3	2012	Youth system	
22	LB	(France)	Sylvain Armand	30	EU	2004	278	9	2012	€3.5M	
23	DM	(France)	Jérémy Clément	26	EU	2006	148	6	2012	€2.2M	
24	LM	(France)	Tripy Makonda	21	EU	2008	10	0	2012	Youth system	
26	RB	(France)	Christophe Jallet	27	EU	2009	43	3	2015	€2.5M	
27	LM	(France)	Younousse Sankharé (Note: Sankharé was born in Sarcelles, France, and represented France at U-21 level, but also qualified to represent Senegal and Mauritania internationally and made his international debut for Senegal in 2015.)	21	EU	2007	47	1	2012	Youth system	
30	GK	(Armenia)	Apoula Edel (Note: Edel was born in Yaoundé, Cameroon, but also holds Armenian nationality and represented Armenia at U-19 and U-21 level before making his international debut for Armenia in 2004.)	24	EU	2008	34	0	2011	€0.12M	
31	AM	(Mali)	Adama Touré	19	Non-EU	2010	0	0		Youth system	
34	DM	(France)	Loïck Landre	19	EU	2011	0	0		Youth system	
35	CM	(Algeria)	Florian Makhedjouf (Note: Makhedjouf was born in Ivry-sur-Seine, France, but also qualified to represent Algeria and Italy internationally through his mother and father respectively and represented Algeria at U-20 level.)	20	EU	2010	0	0		Youth system	
36	FW	(Morocco)	Yacine Qasmi (Note: Qasmi was born in Pontoise, France, but also qualified to represent Morocco internationally and represented Morocco at U-20 level.)	20	EU	2010	0	0		Youth system	
37	FW	(France)	Jean-Christophe Bahebeck	18	EU	2011	0	0		Youth system	
38	AM	(France)	Neeskens Kebano (Note: Kebano was born in Montereau, France, and represented France at U-17, U-18, U-19 and U-20 level, but also qualified to represent the Democratic Republic of the Congo internationally and made his international debut for the Democratic Republic of the Congo in October 2014.)	19	EU	2011	0	0		Youth system	

== Kit ==
Supplier: Nike / Sponsor: Fly Emirates

Home	Home alt.	Home alt. 2	Away	Away alt.	Away alt. 2	Third	Third alt.	Goalkeeper 1	Goalkeeper 2	Goalkeeper 3

=== Kits information ===
Nike manufactured the kits for Paris Saint-Germain and the airline Emirates continued to be the club's main sponsor. Nike have been PSG's official kit provider since 1989. Emirates have been a partner of the capital club since 2005 and the major shirt sponsor since January 2006. PSG were handed brand new home and away kits. The 2010–11 season marked PSG's 40th Anniversary and the shirt commemorated it by reverting to the club's original colours. The Stade Saint-Germain club played mainly in white until 1970, when they merged with Paris FC and combined the white of Saint-Germain-en-Laye with the red and blue colors of Paris. The new shirts presented a special badge commemorating PSG's 40th anniversary. A golden embroidery encircled the shield with the traditional dates 1970 and 2010.

- Home: The home kit was mainly solid red, the original colour of the club. Across the body there was a watermark that red 'PSG 1970'. The v-neck collar and the sleeves ends were navy.
- Away: The away kit had PSG's traditional colors and included graphic details directly inspired by the architecture of the Parc des Princes. It featured a navy blue base with a red vertical band in the middle and two thinner white zigzagging stripes around the band that recalled the architecture of the stadium's roof. The shirt also featured a stylized red trimming around the sleeves ends, the bottom of the shirt and the v-neck collar. The chosen colors and their alternation (blue-white-red-white-blue) honored the club's original graphic codes and dropped Daniel Hechter's historical model.
- Third: The away kit from last season was retained as third kit for 2010–11 season.
- Keeper: PSG goalkeepers wore three different kits throughout the season. The most conspicuous feature of the kits were the black zig-zags on the arms, based on the template Nike used in 2010 for its main clubs. The primary kit was purple, while the alternatives were pink and third were yellow.

== Board and staff ==
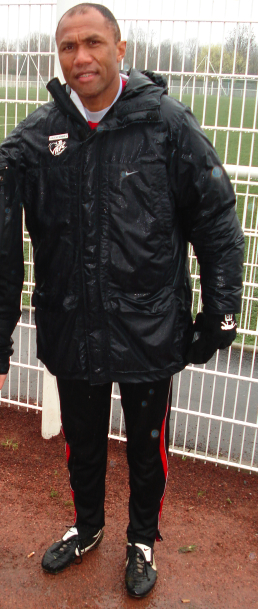
Antoine Kombouaré

Head coach	Antoine Kombouaré
Assistant coach	Yves Bertucci
Goalkeeping coach	Gilles Bourges
Physical trainer	Raphaël Févre
Head doctor	Éric Rolland
Physiotherapists	Bruno Le Natur, Jérôme Andral

Source: PSG.fr

President	Robin Leproux
General manager	Phillipe Boindrieux
Communications	Bruno Skropeta
Recruitment	Alain Roche
Amateur section	Simon Tahar
Academy director	Bertrand Reuzeau
Ground (capacity and dimensions)	Parc des Princes (48,712 / 252m x 191m)

Source: Ligue 1

== Friendly matches ==
Paris Saint-Germain opened their pre-season campaign with a victory over Évian. It was Mathieu Bodmer's first match with Paris. Évian opened the score through Oumar Pouye, but second-half substitute Clément Chantôme saved the day for PSG with a double. "Les Parisiens" continued their preparations for the coming season in a match which saw new recruit Nenê make his debut for Antoine Kombouaré's side as PSG came from behind to record a victory over Portuguese side Sporting CP. Despite falling two goals behind in the first five minutes, with an own from goalkeeper Apoula Edel included, strikes from last season's top scorer Mevlüt Erdinç and Ludovic Giuly had the scores level at the break before Stéphane Sessègnon and Jean-Eudes Maurice scored in the second half to clinch a tough win. Three weeks before the start of the Ligue 1 season, pre-season preparations seemed to be progressing perfectly for PSG as they ran out convincingly winners against Belgian side Mechelen in an empty Camp des Loges, notching their third successive victory thanks to goals from Nenê, Christophe Jallet, Stéphane Sessègnon and Mevlüt Erdinç. Just a few days before the Trophée des Champions and the Tournoi de Paris, Antoine Kombouaré's men could only draw with Legia Warszawa in their last friendly match after being two up following consecutive goals from Guillaume Hoarau and Mateja Kežman. It seemed the hard work was done but the Polish outfit took advantage of PSG's overconfidence and managed to score twice in the final ten minutes.

After 17 years of absence, France's most prestigious tournament was back at the Parc des Princes. The Tournoi de Paris was first held in 1957 and the 2010 edition celebrated its 30th anniversary. Between 1975 and 1993, Paris Saint-Germain won the tournament a record seven times. It was abandoned by PSG's new shareholders Canal+ because of the club's financial deficit in 1993. The last champions were Paris Saint-Germain who defeated Auxerre in the 1993 edition final. The 2010 edition took place between 31 July and 1 August, with Italian side Roma, replacing Juventus, Portuguese club Porto and French outfit Girondins de Bordeaux visiting the Parc des Princes as PSG decided to resurrect the Tournoi de Paris for their 40th birthday. PSG presented their official anthem and mascot. The lyrics of "Go West" were rewritten following the suggestions made by the fans in PSG's website and was released as the official anthem before every match at the Parc des Princes. Germain, a lynx, was presented as the new mascot of PSG. After a draw between Bordeaux and Roma, Paris Saint-Germain defeated Porto in a match punctuated by the numerous chances created by both sides. The French capital won in extremis against the Portuguese thanks to a goal from Sammy Traoré at the end of regular time and took the first place in the standings.

Just like against Porto, "Les Parisiens" made the difference at the end of the encounter as Guillaume Hoarau equalized Roma's lead deep in stoppage time and allowed PSG to finish off their pre-season without having lost a single match. PSG's goal angered Roma's players who surrounded French referee Stéphane Lannoy. Roma coach Claudio Ranieri also walked onto the field to complain that too much injury time had been played when Hoarau scored. Earlier, Michaël Ciani scored off a free kick as Bordeaux came from behind against Porto to win the Tournoi de Paris with four points - the same total as PSG but "Les Girondins" scored one more goal. During the winter break, Paris Saint-Germain drew with Moroccan outfit Wydad Casablanca in Marrakesh. Mouhcine Iajour put the home side ahead but Antoine Kombouaré's men were the dominant force throughout and got a deserved equalizer shortly before half-time when Mevlüt Erdinç headed home Tripy Makonda's cross.

=== Matches ===
10 July 2010 Friendly	Paris Saint-Germain	2–1	Évian	Aix-les-Bains
19:00	Chantôme 68', 75'		Pouye 12'	Stadium: Stade Jacques Forestier; Attendance: 900; Referee: David Mezouar

14 July 2010 Friendly	Paris Saint-Germain	4–2	Sporting CP	Évian-les-Bains
19:00	Erdinç 20'; Giuly 22'; Sessègnon 56'; Maurice 64'		Edel 1' (o.g.); Carriço 4'	Stadium: Stade Camille Fournier; Attendance: 1,500; Referee: Wilfried Bien

17 July 2010 Friendly	Paris Saint-Germain	4–0	Mechelen	Saint-Germain-en-Laye
18:00	Nenê 16'; Jallet 39'; Sessègnon 53'; Erdinç 58'			Stadium: Camp des Loges

23 July 2010 Friendly	Paris Saint-Germain	2–2	Legia Warsaw	Alençon
19:00	Hoarau 75'; Kežman 78'		Żyro 80'; Chinyama 87'	Stadium: Stade Jacques-Fould

31 July 2010 Tournoi de Paris	Paris Saint-Germain	1–0	Porto	Paris
19:00	Traoré 90'			Stadium: Parc des Princes; Attendance: 10,000; Referee: Yohann Rouinsard

1 August 2010 Tournoi de Paris	Paris Saint-Germain	1–1	Roma	Paris
19:00	Hoarau 90'		Greco 46'	Stadium: Parc des Princes; Attendance: 8,000; Referee: Stéphane Lannoy

5 January 2011 Tournoi de Marrakech	Wydad Casablanca	1–1	Paris Saint-Germain	Marrakesh, Morocco
21:00	Iajour 30'		Erdinç 39'	Stadium: Stade de Marrakech; Attendance: 45,000

== Competitions ==
=== Trophée des Champions ===
French football began with reigning Ligue 1 and French Cup champions clashing in the 2010 Trophée des Champions, a competition that raised great expectations in Tunisia, where local fans bet on Hatem Ben Arfa's Olympique, of Tunisian origin. It was the 74th time Le Classique rivals Olympique de Marseille and Paris Saint-Germain played against each other and was the second match, the first being the 2006 French Cup Final, in the rivalry's history to be contested at neither the Stade Vélodrome nor the Parc des Princes. Marseille, backed by their League title and the League Cup, started as theoretical favourites, though their pre-season commitments had been very irregular, with victories over Vannes and Catania, but lost to AS Monaco and Toulouse, both French elite teams. The irregularity was accompanied by the absences of Mamadou Niang, Jordan Ayew, Brandão, Stéphane Mbia and Gabriel Heinze. PSG, meanwhile, finished their pre-season without having lost a single match, with their major concern being the absence through suspension of Guillaume Hoarau. "Les Phocéens" made their debut in the Trophée des Champions, although they won it once under the name "Challenge des Champions" in 1971. French Cup holders PSG, with two Supercups, were making their fifth appearance. Despite a lot of clear chances for both sides, the match went to penalties for the fourth time. From the spot, PSG had emerged victorious on a single occasion, back in 1996 thanks to a penalty miss from Claude Makélélé. Former PSG midfielder Édouard Cissé struck the winning penalty against his former club as Ligue 1 champions Marseille lifted the first trophy of the season, taking the shootout 5–4 in front of a new Champions Trophy record attendance of 57,000 as it finished goalless following 90 minutes. The shootout got off to the worst possible start for PSG as Peguy Luyindula hit the post and the ball rebounded off Steve Mandanda's head to safety. Though Lucho González's "Panenka" was easily saved by Grégory Coupet, Mandanda blocked Ludovic Giuly's sixth kick and Marseille won their fourth consecutive "Classico".

28 July 2010 Final	Marseille	0–0 (5–4 p)	Paris Saint-Germain	Tunis, Tunisia
19:45				Stadium: Stade Olympique de Radès; Attendance: 57,000; Referee: Aouaz Trabelsi (Tunisia)
	Penalties
	Taiwo (penalty scored); Ben Arfa (penalty scored); González (penalty missed); Kaboré (penalty scored); Gnabouyou (penalty scored); Cissé (penalty scored)		(penalty missed) Luyindula; (penalty scored) Jallet; (penalty scored) Nenê; (penalty scored) Kežman; (penalty scored) Makélélé; (penalty missed) Giuly

=== Ligue 1 ===
New signing Nenê grabbed a goal on his Ligue 1 debut for Paris Saint-Germain as the club from the capital produced a commanding win over Saint-Étienne. PSG shaded the good chance count yet their game at Lille finished goalless. Bordeaux returned to winning ways with a thrilling victory against PSG at the Parc des Princes. First-half goals capped off a committed victory from Sochaux and cancelled out Guillaume Hoarau's strike early in the second half. Nenê produced a virtuoso performance with two goals as Paris Saint-Germain defeated Arles-Avignon. Honours were left even at the Parc des Princes as Paris Saint-Germain and Rennes failed to break the deadlock. An own goal from Lens captain Yohan Demont and a superb chipped strike from Nenê in injury time sent PSG to fifth place on the table. Paris Saint-Germain failed to make the breakthrough against Nice and it finished goalless at the Parc des Princes. Mevlüt Erdinç broke his two-month-long goal drought as Paris Saint-Germain stretched their unbeaten run to five league matches with a victory in Toulouse. Auxerre beat Paris Saint-Germain at the Parc des Princes despite Nenê's wondrous display crowned by two goals. Montpellier and Paris Saint-Germain could not be separated as Marco Estrada cancelled out Ludovic Giuly's opener. Mevlüt Erdinç and Guillaume Hoarau both found their scoring form in a sensational first 20 minutes to set Paris up for a win over Olympique de Marseille. Nenê pounced in the 90th to salvage a draw for PSG against Lorient.

Guillaume Hoarau and Mevlüt Erdinç were both on target as Paris Saint-Germain edged Caen at the Parc des Princes to continue their fine recent run of form. Bafétimbi Gomis pounced on an Apoula Edel error to salvage a point for Lyon against Paris Saint-Germain. Nenê's ninth Ligue 1 goal allowed Paris Saint-Germain to run out home winners over Brest and stand second in the table. Nenê took his tally to 11 Ligue 1 strikes as the Brazilian struck twice to keep Paris Saint-Germain in second place with a win at Valenciennes. PSG missed out on first place in Ligue 1 as Daniel Niculae levelled for AS Monaco two minutes from time. Paris Saint-Germain suffered only a second defeat in 23 competitive matches as Nancy registered an unexpected home win. PSG kept up the pressure on Lille at the top of the table with a narrow win over Sochaux at the Parc des Princes. Mevlüt Erdinç netted twice as Paris Saint-Germain survived a second-half fightback from Arles-Avignon to claim a win that kept the pressure on league leaders Lille. Rennes put a miserable last week behind them by edging PSG to get their title bid back on track. Paris Saint-Germain failed to find a way past Lens in a goalless draw at the Parc des Princes. PSG closed to within four points of leaders Lille with a comprehensive win at Nice. Paris Saint-Germain remained in title contention after a hard-fought victory over Toulouse at the Parc des Princes. Kamel Chafni produced a sumptuous strike to give Auxerre the win and dent PSG's title hopes.

Montpellier fought back from two goals down to secure a dramatic draw with PSG thanks to a brace from top scorer Olivier Giroud. Gabriel Heinze and André Ayew scored for Marseille to beat Paris Saint-Germain in the Clasico and climb to second in the table. Paris Saint-Germain extended their negative run after a scoreless home draw against Lorient. PSG returned to winning ways after a four-match winless run when they beat Caen thanks to goals from Christophe Jallet and Clément Chantôme. A freak Zoumana Camara goal was enough for Paris Saint-Germain to beat Lyon at the Parc des Princes to revive their Champions League ambitions. Paris Saint-Germain needed a late goal from Guillaume Hoarau to salvage a point at Brest and draw level with third-placed Lyon. Nenê notched his club-leading 14th Ligue 1 goal as Paris Saint-Germain enjoyed a home win over Valenciennes. Heroic goalkeeping from stand-in Sébastien Chabbert helped Monaco to claim an important point against Paris Saint-Germain at the Stade Louis II. PSG's Champions League hopes took a blow as they let their lead slip to draw with Nancy at the Parc des Princes. Paris Saint-Germain lost at Bordeaux to an early Cheick Diabaté penalty. Moussa Sow scored to help Lille earn the point they needed to be crowned Ligue 1 champions with a draw at Paris Saint-Germain. A Mathieu Bodmer penalty deep in second-half stoppage time earned Paris Saint-Germain a draw at Saint-Étienne as the club from the capital ended the season in fourth.

==== League table ====
Pos	Team	Pld	W	D	L	GF	GA	GD	Pts	Qualification or relegation
2	Marseille	38	18	14	6	62	39	+23	68	Qualification to Champions League group stage
3	Lyon	38	17	13	8	61	40	+21	64	Qualification to Champions League play-off round
4	Paris Saint-Germain	38	15	15	8	56	41	+15	60	Qualification to Europa League play-off round (Note: As 2010–11 Coupe de France winners Lille qualified for the UEFA Champions League and cup runners-up Paris St. Germain were already ensured of a UEFA Europa League spot via league placement, the play-off round berth reserved for the cup winners was awarded to Sochaux, the fifth-placed team.)
5	Sochaux	38	17	7	14	60	43	+17	58	Qualification to Europa League play-off round
6	Rennes	38	15	11	12	38	35	+3	56	Qualification to Europa League third qualifying round (Note: As Coupe de la Ligue winners Marseille qualified for the UEFA Champions League, the UEFA Europa League third qualification round berth reserved for the League Cup winners was awarded to Rennes, the sixth-placed team.)

Source: Ligue 1
Rules for classification: 1) points; 2) goal difference; 3) number of goals scored.

==== Results summary ====
Overall								Home						Away					
Pld	W	D	L	GF	GA	GD	Pts	W	D	L	GF	GA	GD	W	D	L	GF	GA	GD
38	15	15	8	56	41	+15	60	9	8	2	33	20	+13	6	7	6	23	21	+2

Source: Ligue 1

==== Results by round ====
Round	1	2	3	4	5	6	7	8	9	10	11	12	13	14	15	16	17	18	19	20	21	22	23	24	25	26	27	28	29	30	31	32	33	34	35	36	37	38
Ground	H	A	H	A	H	H	A	H	A	H	A	H	A	H	A	H	A	H	A	H	A	A	H	A	H	A	H	A	H	A	H	A	H	A	H	A	H	A
Result	W	D	L	L	W	D	W	D	W	L	D	W	D	W	D	W	W	D	L	W	W	L	D	W	W	L	D	L	D	W	W	D	W	D	D	L	D	D
Position	1	4	7	13	7	9	5	7	3	7	7	3	5	4	4	2	2	2	2	2	2	2	4	5	4	5	5	5	5	5	4	4	4	4	4	4	4	4

Source: Ligue 1
A = Away; H = Home; W = Win; D = Draw; L = Loss

==== Matches ====
7 August 2010 1	Paris Saint-Germain	3–1	Saint-Étienne	Paris
21:00	Erdinç 5'; Sessègnon 42'; Nenê 83'		Payet 39'	Stadium: Parc des Princes; Attendance: 22,689; Referee: Olivier Thual

15 August 2010 2	Lille	0–0	Paris Saint-Germain	Villeneuve-d'Ascq
21:00				Stadium: Stadium Lille Métropole; Attendance: 15,790; Referee: Fredy Fautrel

22 August 2010 3	Paris Saint-Germain	1–2	Bordeaux	Paris
21:00	Hoarau 76'		Diarra 67'; Ciani 90+4'	Stadium: Parc des Princes; Attendance: 30,073; Referee: Antony Gautier

29 August 2010 4	Sochaux	3–1	Paris Saint-Germain	Montbéliard
17:00	Maïga 14'; Ideye 20'; Perquis 45+1'		Hoarau 50'	Stadium: Stade Auguste-Bonal; Attendance: 12,222; Referee: Stéphane Lannoy

11 September 2010 5	Paris Saint-Germain	4–0	Arles-Avignon	Paris
19:00	Hoarau 18'; Sakho 29'; Nenê 49', 56'			Stadium: Parc des Princes; Attendance: 19,025; Referee: Sébastien Moreira

18 September 2010 6	Paris Saint-Germain	0–0	Rennes	Paris
19:00				Stadium: Parc des Princes; Attendance: 28,606; Referee: Clément Turpin

26 September 2010 7	Lens	0–2	Paris Saint-Germain	Lens
21:00			Yahia 50' (o.g.); Nenê 90+2'	Stadium: Stade Félix-Bollaert; Attendance: 28,676; Referee: Bruno Coué

3 October 2010 8	Paris Saint-Germain	0–0	Nice	Paris
17:00				Stadium: Parc des Princes; Attendance: 22,595; Referee: Damien Ledentu

16 October 2010 9	Toulouse	0–2	Paris Saint-Germain	Toulouse
21:00			Sakho 11'; Erdinç 56'	Stadium: Stadium de Toulouse; Attendance: 20,437; Referee: Lionel Jaffredo

24 October 2010 10	Paris Saint-Germain	2–3	Auxerre	Paris
17:00	Nenê 1', 68'		Mignot 4'; Contout 11'; Quercia 24'	Stadium: Parc des Princes; Attendance: 27,523; Referee: Laurent Duhamel

31 October 2010 11	Montpellier	1–1	Paris Saint-Germain	Montpellier
21:00	Estrada 42'		Giuly 37'	Stadium: Stade de la Mosson; Attendance: 19,967; Referee: Saïd Ennjimi

7 November 2010 12	Paris Saint-Germain	2–1	Marseille	Paris
21:00	Erdinç 9'; Hoarau 19'		Lucho 23'	Stadium: Parc des Princes; Attendance: 40,234; Referee: Stéphane Lannoy

14 November 2010 13	Lorient	1–1	Paris Saint-Germain	Lorient
17:00	Kitambala 32'		Nenê 90'	Stadium: Stade du Moustoir; Attendance: 15,422; Referee: Alexandre Castro

20 November 2010 14	Paris Saint-Germain	2–1	Caen	Paris
19:00	Hoarau 40'; Erdinç 50'		El-Arabi 85'	Stadium: Parc des Princes; Attendance: 26,190; Referee: Clément Turpin

28 November 2010 15	Lyon	2–2	Paris Saint-Germain	Lyon
21:00	Cissokho 54'; Gomis 87'		Nenê 63'; Hoarau 83' (pen.)	Stadium: Stade de Gerland; Attendance: 34,965; Referee: Fredy Fautrel

5 December 2010 16	Paris Saint-Germain	3–1	Brest	Paris
17:00	Nenê 5'; Bodmer 59'; Giuly 77'		Roux 53'	Stadium: Parc des Princes; Attendance: 28,058; Referee: Laurent Duhamel

11 December 2010 17	Valenciennes	1–2	Paris Saint-Germain	Valenciennes
19:00	Aboubakar 82'		Nenê 47', 84'	Stadium: Stade Nungesser; Attendance: 11,136; Referee: Bruno Coué

18 December 2010 18	Paris Saint-Germain	2–2	Monaco	Paris
21:00	Nenê 40', 53'		Puygrenier 32'; Niculae 88'	Stadium: Parc des Princes; Attendance: 32,842; Referee: Lionel Jaffredo

22 December 2010 19	Nancy	2–0	Paris Saint-Germain	Tomblaine
19:00	Hadji 66', 83'			Stadium: Stade Marcel Picot; Attendance: 17,845; Referee: Antony Gautier

15 January 2011 20	Paris Saint-Germain	2–1	Sochaux	Paris
19:00	Sakho 16'; Giuly 23'		Maïga 14'	Stadium: Parc des Princes; Attendance: 28,201; Referee: Wilfried Bien

29 January 2011 21	Arles-Avignon	1–2	Paris Saint-Germain	Avignon
19:00	N'Diaye 57'		Erdinç 18', 49'	Stadium: Parc des Sports; Attendance: 8,576; Referee: Damien Ledentu

5 February 2011 22	Rennes	1–0	Paris Saint-Germain	Rennes
21:00	Brahimi 19'			Stadium: Stade de la Route de Lorient; Attendance: 26,001; Referee: Laurent Duhamel

12 February 2011 23	Paris Saint-Germain	0–0	Lens	Paris
19:00				Stadium: Parc des Princes; Attendance: 32,919; Referee: Nicolas Rainville

19 February 2011 24	Nice	0–3	Paris Saint-Germain	Nice
19:00			Giuly 24'; Hoarau 43'; Armand 75'	Stadium: Stade du Ray; Attendance: 8,655; Referee: Lionel Jaffredo

26 February 2011 25	Paris Saint-Germain	2–1	Toulouse	Paris
19:00	Armand 28'; Gunino 38' (o.g.)		Tabanou 62'	Stadium: Parc des Princes; Attendance: 29,860; Referee: Philippe Malige

5 March 2011 26	Auxerre	1–0	Paris Saint-Germain	Auxerre
21:00	Chafni 86'			Stadium: Stade de l'Abbé-Deschamps; Attendance: 12,045; Referee: Frank Schneider

13 March 2011 27	Paris Saint-Germain	2–2	Montpellier	Paris
21:00	Hoarau 11'; Yanga-Mbiwa 13' (o.g.)		Giroud 47', 59'	Stadium: Parc des Princes; Attendance: 23,605; Referee: Ruddy Buquet

20 March 2011 28	Marseille	2–1	Paris Saint-Germain	Marseille
21:00	Heinze 16'; Ayew 35'		Chantôme 27'	Stadium: Stade Vélodrome; Attendance: 52,792; Referee: Stéphane Bré

2 April 2011 29	Paris Saint-Germain	0–0	Lorient	Paris
19:00				Stadium: Parc des Princes; Attendance: 27,226; Referee: Fredy Fautrel

9 April 2011 30	Caen	1–2	Paris Saint-Germain	Caen
19:00	Hamouma 90+3'		Jallet 13'; Chantôme 69'	Stadium: Stade Michel d'Ornano; Attendance: 18,981; Referee: Sébastien Moreira

16 April 2011 31	Paris Saint-Germain	1–0	Lyon	Paris
19:00	Camara 76'			Stadium: Parc des Princes; Attendance: 40,133; Referee: Laurent Duhamel

24 April 2011 32	Brest	2–2	Paris Saint-Germain	Brest
19:00	Touré 37'; Grougi 45'		Bodmer 20'; Kantari 87' (o.g.)	Stadium: Stade Francis-Le Blé; Attendance: 14,550; Referee: Tony Chapron

30 April 2011 33	Paris Saint-Germain	3–1	Valenciennes	Paris
19:00	Nenê 10'; Bodmer 22'; Sakho 88'		Pujol 44'	Stadium: Parc des Princes; Attendance: 29,158; Referee: Jean-Charles Cailleux

7 May 2011 34	Monaco	1–1	Paris Saint-Germain	Fontvieille
19:00	Adriano 25'		Erdinç 51'	Stadium: Stade Louis II; Attendance: 9,338; Referee: Antony Gautier

10 May 2011 35	Paris Saint-Germain	2–2	Nancy	Paris
21:00	Erdinç 4'; Camara 45'		Nguémo 21' (pen.); Hadji 69'	Stadium: Parc des Princes; Attendance: 27,675; Referee: Olivier Thual

18 May 2011 36	Bordeaux	1–0	Paris Saint-Germain	Bordeaux
19:00	Diabaté 6' (pen.)			Stadium: Stade Chaban-Delmas; Attendance: 25,648; Referee: Laurent Duhamel

21 May 2011 37	Paris Saint-Germain	2–2	Lille	Paris
21:00	Hoarau 45+3'; Bodmer 72'		Obraniak 5'; Sow 59'	Stadium: Parc des Princes; Attendance: 40,404; Referee: Lionel Jaffredo

29 May 2011 38	Saint-Étienne	1–1	Paris Saint-Germain	Saint-Étienne
21:00	Guilavogui 70'		Bodmer 90+1'	Stadium: Stade Geoffroy-Guichard; Attendance: 25,874; Referee: Philippe Kalt

=== Coupe de France ===
Ligue 1 sides entered the draw for the last-64 of the French Cup and in a replay of the 2008 Coupe de la Ligue final, defending champions Paris Saint-Germain hosted Lens at the Parc des Princes. Antoine Kombouaré's men ensured they kept their title defence alive with an impressive display against fellow Ligue 1 side Lens at the Parc des Princes. Zoumana Camara gave the hosts a half-time lead before further strikes from Nenê, Guillaume Hoarau and Peguy Luyindula sent Paris through. Paris Saint-Germain began their defence of the trophy by putting five past Lens, and then faced a trip to Aquitaine to play Agen of the fifth division, one of the smallest sides left in the tournament. Holders Paris Saint-Germain were made to work hard by Agen. Mathieu Bodmer had given the visitors the perfect start with an excellent angled shot but the sides turned around level as Daffé equalised. Peguy Luyindula, handed a rare start by Antoine Kombouaré, restored PSG's advantage after Guillaume Hoarau cleverly dummied a pass from Nenê. Seconds later, Hoarau headed in from a Nenê free-kick. Vandersnick reduced the final winning margin as Paris were still in contention to retain their crown and were also competing for honours in Ligue 1 and the Europa League. The seven Ligue 1 clubs left in the French Cup were all drawn against lower-level opposition. Holders Paris travelled south to play Martigues. Guillaume Hoarau's hat-trick gave French Cup holders Paris the victory in Martigues. Antoine Kombouaré's men stormed home in the second half against their ten-man opponents to secure a place in the quarter-finals. Paris Saint-Germain were drawn at home against Ligue 2 club Le Mans. Holders Paris Saint-Germain needed extra-time to see off Ligue 2 leaders Le Mans in the French Cup quarter-finals. Holders Paris Saint-Germain travelled to Angers in the last four of the French Cup after the draw was made. Paris Saint-Germain booked a place in the final with a win in Angers, Brazilian winger Nenê rediscovering top form – with a goal and two assists – to set up a clash with Lille at the Stade de France on 14 May. Lille overcame their nerves – and a feisty Paris side – to claim their first French Cup in 56 years thanks to a wonder goal from substitute Ludovic Obraniak with just a minute left on the clock.

==== Matches ====
8 January 2011 Round of 64	Paris Saint-Germain	5–1	Lens	Paris
20:45	Camara 20'; Nenê (yellow card) 47', (goal) 50'; Hoarau; Luyindula 75'		Varane (yellow card) 16'; Roudet (yellow card) 20'; Yahia (red card) 52'; Eduardo 82' (pen.)	Stadium: Parc des Princes; Attendance: 10,000; Referee: Alexandre Castro

23 January 2011 Round of 32	Agen	2–3	Paris Saint-Germain	Agen
17:00	Daffé 41'; Melka (yellow card) 66'; Vandersnick 69'; Pothet (yellow card) 72'; Daffé (yellow card) 90+1'		Bodmer 13'; Luyindula 47'; Hoarau 50'; Camara (yellow card) 80'	Stadium: Stade Armandie; Attendance: 12,000; Referee: Ruddy Buquet

2 February 2011 Round of 16	Martigues	1–4	Paris Saint-Germain	Martigues
17:00	Dembélé (red card) 21'; Bochu (yellow card) 26'; Daineche (yellow card) 27'; Biakolo 45+6' (pen.); Belloumou (yellow card) 47'		Chantôme (yellow card) 12'; Hoarau 15', 79', 90+1'; Luyindula 64'; Traoré (yellow card) 74'	Stadium: Stade Francis-Turcan; Attendance: 7,500; Referee: Clément Turpin

2 March 2011 Quarter-finals	Paris Saint-Germain	2–0 (a.e.t.)	Le Mans	Paris
19:00	Camara (yellow card) 19' (yellow-red card) 78'; Hoarau (yellow card) 58'; Bahebeck 108'; Kebano 117'		Wagué (yellow card) 45' (yellow-red card) 91'; Cissé (yellow card) 80'; Bouhours (yellow card) 114'	Stadium: Parc des Princes; Attendance: 12,760; Referee: Wilfried Bien

20 April 2011 Semi-finals	Angers	1–3	Paris Saint-Germain	Angers
20:45	Auriac (yellow card) 53'; Renouard 57'; Couturier (yellow card) 66'		Bodmer 22', (yellow card) 82'; Nenê 50', (yellow card) 79'; Hoarau 62'	Stadium: Stade Jean-Bouin; Attendance: 17,000; Referee: Bruno Coué

14 May 2011 Final	Paris Saint-Germain	0–1	Lille	Paris
20:45	Nenê (yellow card) 42'; Tiéné (yellow card) 87'; Chantôme (yellow card) 90'		Gueye (yellow card) 49'; Obraniak 89'	Stadium: Stade de France; Attendance: 80,000; Referee: Clément Turpin

=== Coupe de la Ligue ===
The draw for the last 16 of the League Cup pitted Olympique Lyonnais playing host to Paris Saint-Germain as Ligue 1's European contenders entered into the competition after receiving byes for the earlier rounds. Paris left it late at the Stade de Gerland but, after extra-time, managed to overcome Lyon to book a place in the quarter-finals thanks to goals by former Lyon stars Mathieu Bodmer and Ludovic Giuly. Paris Saint-Germain were rewarded for their extra-time victory at Lyon with another away game, this time against Valenciennes. Antoine Kombouaré made several changes to the Paris side from the Clasico for the clash with his former club. Paris Saint-Germain held their nerve, though, and continued their excellent run by winning at the Stade Nungesser to seal their place in the League Cup semi-finals. Zoumana Camara, Christophe Jallet, and Peguy Luyindula all found the net as the capital club came from behind. Paris Saint-Germain were pitted against Montpellier again on the road. Having avoided a clash against arch-rivals Olympique de Marseille, PSG was looking for a quick return to the Stade de France after last season's French Cup triumph. An Olivier Giroud header three minutes from the end of extra-time took Montpellier into the League Cup Final at the expense of Paris Saint-Germain after a nervy evening at the Stade de la Mosson.

==== Matches ====
27 October 2010 Round of 16	Lyon	1–2 (a.e.t.)	Paris Saint-Germain	Lyon
20:45	Briand 38'; Bastos (yellow card) 77'; Pied (yellow card) 90'		Bodmer (yellow card) 27', (goal) 86'; Jallet (yellow card) 77'; Giuly 101'; Clément (yellow card) 112'; Camara (yellow card) 119'	Stadium: Stade de Gerland; Attendance: 26,587; Referee: Ruddy Buquet

10 November 2010 Quarter-finals	Valenciennes	1–3	Paris Saint-Germain	Valenciennes
17:00	Dossevi 3'		Tiéné (yellow card) 5'; Camara 9'; Jallet 27'; Luyindula 51'; Armand (yellow card) 75'	Stadium: Stade Nungesser; Attendance: 7,395; Referee: Stéphane Bré

18 January 2011 Semi-finals	Montpellier	1–0 (a.e.t.)	Paris Saint-Germain	Montpellier
20:45	Jeunechamp (yellow card) 56'; Bocaly (yellow card) 83'; Dernis (yellow card) 90+3'; Giroud 117', (yellow card) 119'; Yanga-Mbiwa (yellow card) 120+1'		Tiéné (yellow card) 31'; Chantôme (yellow card) 51' (yellow-red card) 88'; Giuly (yellow card) 84'; Sakho (yellow card) 119'	Stadium: Stade de la Mosson; Attendance: 17,641; Referee: Saïd Ennjimi

=== UEFA Europa League ===
Paris Saint-Germain faced Maccabi Tel Aviv for a place in the group stages of the Europa League after the play-off round draw at UEFA headquarters in Switzerland. PSG's French Cup triumph saw them stamp their ticket for a return to continental competition where they hosted the first leg at the Parc des Princes before heading to Israel for the return tie a week later. Paris Saint-Germain took the lead to Israel for the second leg of their play-off tie with Maccabi Tel Aviv. Peguy Luyindula and Guillaume Hoarau scored the PSG goals. Paris Saint-Germain lost at Maccabi Tel Aviv but still advanced to the group stage of the Europa League on aggregate. Paris Saint-Germain came up against former Champions League winners Borussia Dortmund and former UEFA Cup champions Sevilla in a testing Group J in which Ukrainian team Karpaty Lviv were the outsiders. Nenê pounced for the only goal of the game as PSG notched an upset win away to Sevilla. Paris Saint-Germain were in command of Group J after defeating Karpaty Lviv at the Parc des Princes. Paris Saint-Germain drew with Borussia Dortmund thanks to substitute Clément Chantôme's 87th-minute strike. Paris Saint-Germain were held to a goalless draw by Borussia Dortmund in an entertaining affair in the capital. Mathieu Bodmer, Nenê and Guillaume Hoarau did the damage for the capital club as they qualified for the last-32 after inflicting a second defeat on Sevilla to give a hint that PSG's glory days of Cup Winners' Cup and Intertoto triumphs could be on the way back.

Paris Saint-Germain were held to a draw in their final Europa League group game away to Karpaty Lviv but the result proved good enough for the Ligue 1 side to go through to the last-32 as group winners. PSG - who reached the last eight of the UEFA Cup in 2009 - faced Belarusian champions BATE Borisov in the last-32. If they came through that, then they had to meet either Portuguese champions Benfica or Bundesliga giants Stuttgart in the following round. PSG had Peguy Luyindula's last-gasp strike to thank for their strong perspective on the return leg. PSG were the only French club left in the Europa League after ten-man Lille crashed out with an aggregate loss to PSV in Eindhoven. PSG's aggregate win over BATE Borisov booked them a place in the last 16 against Benfica. Despite losing to Benfica in Lisbon, PSG took a lot of positives - and Peguy Luyindula's away goal - into the return leg of their Europa League tie at the Parc des Princes. After Marseille and Lyon, PSG became the third French side to crash out of Europe in as many days, their draw handing Benfica an aggregate win to progress to the Europa League quarter-finals.

==== Play-off round ====
19 August 2010 First leg	Paris Saint-Germain (France)	2–0	(Israel) Maccabi Tel Aviv	Paris, France
18:30	Luyindula 3'; Hoarau 60'	Report		Stadium: Parc des Princes; Attendance: 8,500; Referee: Kevin Blom (Netherlands)

26 August 2010 Second leg	Maccabi Tel Aviv (Israel)	4–3 (4–5 agg.)	(France) Paris Saint-Germain	Tel Aviv, Israel
20:00	Atar 48', 90+5'; Avidor 68'; Medunjanin 83' (pen.)	Report	Hoarau 40' (pen.); Giuly 64'; Nenê 90+3' (pen.)	Stadium: Bloomfield Stadium; Attendance: 8,674; Referee: Mike Dean (England)

==== Group stage ====
Pos	Team	Pld	W	D	L	GF	GA	GD	Pts	Qualification	PSG	SEV	DOR	KAR
1	(France) Paris Saint-Germain	6	3	3	0	9	4	+5	12	Advance to knockout phase	—	4–2	0–0	2–0
2	(Spain) Sevilla	6	3	1	2	10	7	+3	10	Advance to knockout phase	0–1	—	2–2	4–0
3	(Germany) Borussia Dortmund	6	2	3	1	10	7	+3	9		1–1	0–1	—	3–0
4	(Ukraine) Karpaty Lviv	6	0	1	5	4	15	−11	1		1–1	0–1	3–4	—

Source: Soccerway

16 September 2010 1	Sevilla (Spain)	0–1	(France) Paris Saint-Germain	Seville, Spain
21:05		Report	Nenê 75'	Stadium: Ramón Sánchez Pizjuán; Attendance: 24,960; Referee: Robert Schörgenhofer (Austria)

30 September 2010 2	Paris Saint-Germain (France)	2–0	(Ukraine) Karpaty Lviv	Paris, France
19:00	Jallet 4'; Nenê 20'	Report		Stadium: Parc des Princes; Attendance: 9,117; Referee: Marijo Strahonja (Croatia)

21 October 2010 3	Borussia Dortmund (Germany)	1–1	(France) Paris Saint-Germain	Dortmund, Germany
19:00	Şahin 50' (pen.)	Report	Chantôme 87'	Stadium: Westfalenstadion; Attendance: 50,200; Referee: Jonas Eriksson (Sweden)

4 November 2010 4	Paris Saint-Germain (France)	0–0	(Germany) Borussia Dortmund	Paris, France
21:05		Report		Stadium: Parc des Princes; Attendance: 26,204; Referee: Pavel Královec (Czech Republic)

2 December 2010 5	Paris Saint-Germain (France)	4–2	(Spain) Sevilla	Paris, France
19:00	Bodmer 17'; Hoarau 20', 47'; Nenê 45'	Report	Kanouté 32', 36'	Stadium: Parc des Princes; Attendance: 18,783; Referee: Luca Banti (Italy)

15 December 2010 6	Karpaty Lviv (Ukraine)	1–1	(France) Paris Saint-Germain	Lviv, Ukraine
21:05	Fedetskiy 45'	Report	Luyindula 39'	Stadium: Ukraina Stadium; Attendance: 14,000; Referee: Espen Berntsen (Norway)

==== Knockout phase ====
===== Round of 32 =====
17 February 2011 First leg	BATE Borisov (Belarus)	2–2	(France) Paris Saint-Germain	Minsk, Belarus
19:00	Bressan 16'; Gordeichuk 80'	Report	Erdinç 29'; Luyindula 89'	Stadium: Dinamo Stadium; Attendance: 6,080; Referee: Alon Yefet (Israel)

24 February 2011 Second leg	Paris Saint-Germain (France)	0–0 (2a–2 agg.)	(Belarus) BATE Borisov	Paris, France
21:05		Report		Stadium: Parc des Princes; Attendance: 17,717; Referee: Kevin Blom (Netherlands)

===== Round of 16 =====
10 March 2011 First leg	Benfica (Portugal)	2–1	(France) Paris Saint-Germain	Lisbon, Portugal
21:05	Pereira 42'; Jara 81'	Report	Luyindula 14'	Stadium: Estádio da Luz; Attendance: 33,928; Referee: Pavel Královec (Czech Republic)

17 March 2011 Second leg	Paris Saint-Germain (France)	1–1 (2–3 agg.)	(Portugal) Benfica	Paris, France
19:00	Bodmer 35'	Report	Gaitán 27'	Stadium: Parc des Princes; Attendance: 40,193; Referee: William Collum (Scotland)

== Start formations ==
Qnt	Formation	Match(es)
41	4-4-2	L1 (26), UEL (8), CL (3), CF (3), TC (1)
19	4-2-3-1	L1 (12), UEL (4), CF (3)

Source: PSG.fr
Only competitive matches.

Starting XI

No.	Pos.	Nat.	Name	MS	Notes
30	GK	(Armenia)	Apoula Edel	36	
26	RB	(France)	Christophe Jallet	49	
22	CB	(France)	Sylvain Armand	42	
3	CB	(France)	Mamadou Sakho	50	
5	LB	(Ivory Coast)	Siaka Tiéné	40	
19	LW	(Brazil)	Nenê	51	
4	DM	(France)	Claude Makélélé	41	
20	CM	(France)	Clément Chantôme	42	
7	RW	(France)	Ludovic Giuly	36	
11	FW	(Turkey)	Mevlüt Erdinç	43	
9	FW	(France)	Guillaume Hoarau	43	

Source: Squad stats and Start formations.
Only competitive matches.
Using the most used start formation.
Ordered by position on pitch (from back right to front left).

== Appearances and goals ==
No.	Nat.	Position	Player	Total		Ligue 1		Coupe de France		Coupe de la Ligue		Trophée des Champions		UEFA Europa League
No.	Nat.	Position	Player	Apps	Goals	Apps	Goals	Apps	Goals	Apps	Goals	Apps	Goals	Apps	Goals
1	(France)	GK	Grégory Coupet	24	0	15	0	4	0	3	0	1	0	1	0
16	(France)	GK	Alphonse Areola	0	0	0	0	0	0	0	0	0	0	0	0
30	(Armenia)	GK	Apoula Edel	37	0	24	0	2	0	0	0	0	0	11	0
2	(Brazil)	DF	Ceará	35	0	20	0	5	0	2	0	0	0	8	0
3	(France)	DF	Mamadou Sakho	50	4	35	4	4	0	1	0	1	0	9	0
5	(Ivory Coast)	DF	Siaka Tiéné	42	0	29	0	3	0	2	0	0	0	8	0
6	(France)	DF	Zoumana Camara	36	4	17	2	6	1	2	1	1	0	10	0
13	(Mali)	DF	Sammy Traoré	6	0	2	0	2	0	0	0	0	0	2	0
22	(France)	DF	Sylvain Armand	46	2	33	2	3	0	3	0	1	0	6	0
26	(France)	DF	Christophe Jallet	52	3	35	1	4	0	3	1	1	0	9	1
4	(France)	MF	Claude Makélélé	42	0	33	0	3	0	2	0	1	0	3	0
10	(Benin)	MF	Stéphane Sessègnon	23	0	14	0	0	0	2	0	1	0	6	0
12	(France)	MF	Mathieu Bodmer	42	10	28	5	4	2	1	1	1	0	8	2
19	(Brazil)	MF	Nenê	51	20	35	14	5	2	1	0	1	0	9	4
20	(France)	MF	Clément Chantôme	44	3	26	2	4	0	3	0	0	0	11	1
23	(France)	MF	Jérémy Clément	44	0	24	0	6	0	3	0	1	0	10	0
24	(France)	MF	Tripy Makonda	17	0	4	0	3	0	3	0	0	0	7	0
27	(France)	MF	Younousse Sankharé	0	0	0	0	0	0	0	0	0	0	0	0
31	(Mali)	MF	Adama Touré	0	0	0	0	0	0	0	0	0	0	0	0
34	(France)	MF	Loïck Landre	1	0	1	0	0	0	0	0	0	0	0	0
35	(Algeria)	MF	Florian Makhedjouf	3	0	0	0	1	0	0	0	0	0	2	0
38	(France)	MF	Neeskens Kebano	7	1	3	0	2	1	0	0	0	0	2	0
7	(France)	FW	Ludovic Giuly	45	6	35	4	2	0	2	1	1	0	5	1
8	(France)	FW	Peguy Luyindula	41	8	23	0	4	3	2	1	1	0	11	4
9	(France)	FW	Guillaume Hoarau	51	20	33	9	6	7	3	0	0	0	9	4
11	(Turkey)	FW	Mevlüt Erdinç	54	9	34	8	6	0	3	0	1	0	10	1
14	(Serbia)	FW	Mateja Kežman	3	0	1	0	0	0	0	0	1	0	1	0
18	(France)	FW	Loris Arnaud	0	0	0	0	0	0	0	0	0	0	0	0
21	(Haiti)	FW	Jean-Eudes Maurice	21	0	10	0	2	0	1	0	0	0	8	0
36	(Morocco)	FW	Yacine Qasmi	1	0	0	0	0	0	0	0	0	0	1	0
37	(France)	FW	Jean-Christophe Bahebeck	13	1	11	0	2	1	0	0	0	0	0	0

== Other statistics ==
No.	Pos.	Nat.	Player	Assists	Minutes Played	Yellow card	Red card
1	GK	(France)	Grégory Coupet	0	2104	0	0
16	GK	(France)	Alphonse Areola	0	0	0	0
30	GK	(Armenia)	Apoula Edel	0	3296	0	0
2	DF	(Brazil)	Ceará	1	2532	2	0
3	DF	(France)	Mamadou Sakho	1	4264	6	1
5	DF	(Ivory Coast)	Siaka Tiéné	1	3548	15	0
6	DF	(France)	Zoumana Camara	2	2999	6	1
13	DF	(Mali)	Sammy Traoré	0	282	1	0
22	DF	(France)	Sylvain Armand	1	3875	9	0
26	DF	(France)	Christophe Jallet	2	4349	6	1
4	MF	(France)	Claude Makélélé	1	3575	7	0
10	MF	(Benin)	Stéphane Sessègnon	3	1271	2	0
12	MF	(France)	Mathieu Bodmer	5	2695	6	0
19	MF	(Brazil)	Nenê	15	4372	7	0
20	MF	(France)	Clément Chantôme	1	3645	16	1
23	MF	(France)	Jérémy Clément	0	2384	6	1
24	MF	(France)	Tripy Makonda	1	628	2	0
27	MF	(France)	Younousse Sankharé	0	0	0	0
31	MF	(Mali)	Adama Touré	0	0	0	0
34	MF	(France)	Loïck Landre	0	60	0	0
35	MF	(Algeria)	Florian Makhedjouf	0	22	0	0
38	MF	(France)	Neeskens Kebano	0	151	0	0
7	FW	(France)	Ludovic Giuly	10	2945	5	0
8	FW	(France)	Peguy Luyindula	4	2072	1	0
9	FW	(France)	Guillaume Hoarau	8	3679	5	1
11	FW	(Turkey)	Mevlüt Erdinç	3	3462	2	0
14	FW	(Serbia)	Mateja Kežman	0	51	1	0
18	FW	(France)	Loris Arnaud	0	0	0	0
21	FW	(Haiti)	Jean-Eudes Maurice	0	676	1	0
36	FW	(Morocco)	Yacine Qasmi	0	13	0	0
37	FW	(France)	Jean-Christophe Bahebeck	0	268	0	0

Only competitive matches
(yellow card) = Number of bookings; (second yellow card) = Number of sending offs after a second yellow card; (red card) = Number of sending offs by a direct red card.
