= 2009–10 Coupe de la Ligue =

French League Cup

Tournament details
- Country: France
- Dates: 25 July 2009 – 27 March 2010
- Teams: 44

Final positions
- Champions: Marseille (1st title)
- Runners-up: Bordeaux

Tournament statistics
- Matches played: 43
- Goals scored: 128 (2.98 per match)
- Top goal scorer: Brandão (4 goals)

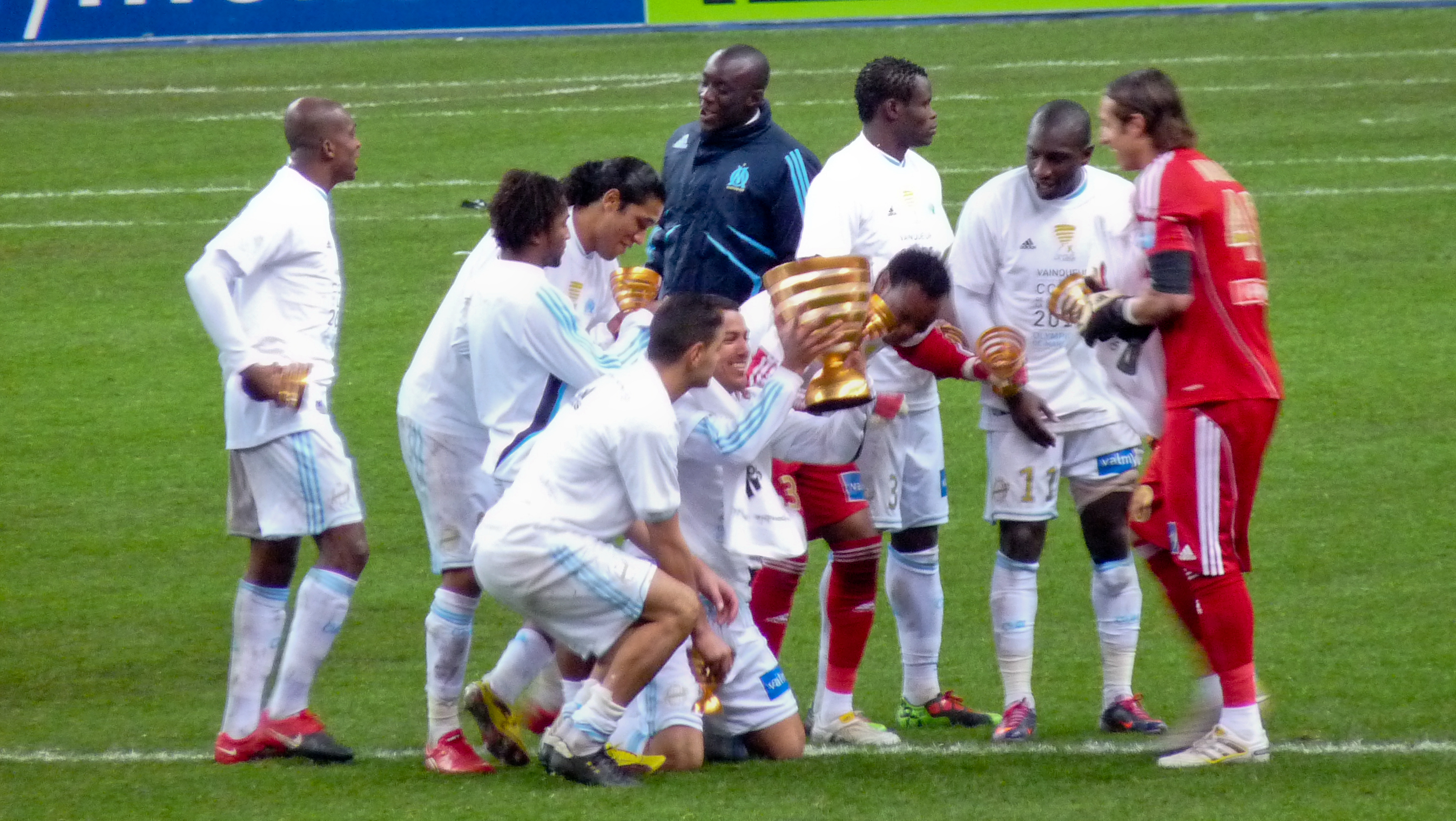
Marseille wins the final on March 27, 2010

The 2009–10 Coupe de la Ligue was the 16th edition of France's league cup, organized by the LFP. The defending champions were Ligue 1 club Bordeaux who defeated second division club Vannes 4–0 in the 2009 final. The competition began on 25 July 2009 and the final was held on 27 March 2010 at the Stade de France. The winners of the Coupe de la Ligue will qualify for the third qualifying round of the 2010–11 UEFA Europa League. Ligue 1 club Marseille won the competition by defeating fellow first division club Bordeaux by a score of 3–1 in the final, thus giving them their first trophy since 1992.

== News ==
On 29 June 2009, the Ligue de Football Professionnel board of directors announced that France Télévisions will be the official provider of Coupe de la Ligue coverage for the next three seasons.

For the 2009–10 Coupe de la Ligue season, six clubs will be exempted until the Round of 16, the top 5 Ligue 1 finishers from the 2008–09 season and the winner of the 2008–09 Coupe de France. These teams earned exemption by virtue of qualifying for European competitions this season. Previously, only two clubs were exempted, the Ligue 1 champions and the runners-up. The six clubs that are exempted this year are Bordeaux, Marseille, Lyon, Toulouse, Lille, and Guingamp.

The draw for the preliminary round, 1st round, and 2nd round was determined on 8 July.

== Calendar ==
Round	First match date	Fixtures	Clubs
Preliminary Round	25 July 2009	3	44 → 41
First Round	1 August 2009	10	41 → 31
Second Round	25 August 2009	5	31 → 26
Third Round	22 September 2009	10	26 → 16
Round of 16	12 January 2010	8	16 → 8
Quarter-finals	26 January 2010	4	8 → 4
Semi-finals	2 February 2010	2	4 → 2
Final (Stade de France)	27 March 2010	1	2 → 1

== Preliminary round ==
The preliminary round was played on 25 July and featured the 2nd and 3rd-place finishers from the 2008–09 Championnat National season, the bottom three finishers from the 2008–09 Ligue 2 season, and FC Gueugnon, all of whom qualified by virtue of their professional status in the LFP .

25 July 2009	Reims	1–2	Amiens	Reims
19:00 CET	Barbier 50'	Report	Lopez-Peralta 65'; Paass 73'	Stadium: Stade Auguste-Delaune II; Attendance: 5,480; Referee: Yohann Rouinsard (Île-de-France)

25 July 2009	Gueugnon	1–2	Troyes	Gueugnon
19:00 CET	Previtali 15'	Report	Lafourcade 5', 13'	Stadium: Stade Jean Laville; Attendance: 1,365; Referee: Frank Schneider (Alsace)

25 July 2009	Laval	5–0	Arles-Avignon	Laval
19:00 CET	Do Marcolino 33'; Chapuis 49', 68'; Genest 56', 60'	Report		Stadium: Stade Francis Le Basser; Attendance: 3,638; Referee: Jean-Charles Cailleux (Picardie)

Source: LFP

== First round ==
The 1st round was played on 1 August and featured the three winners from the preliminary round, the bottom three finishers from the 2009 Ligue 1 season, the top finisher from the 2009 Championnat National season and thirteen mid-table teams from Ligue 2.

1 August 2009	Dijon	2–0	Brest	Dijon
19:00 CET	Kitambala 72'; Mangione 80' (pen.)	Report		Stadium: Stade Gaston Gérard; Attendance: 3,239; Referee: Sébastien Desiage (Rhône-Alpes)

1 August 2009	Tours	2–1	Le Havre	Tours
19:00 CET	Giroud 82', 89'	Report	Gillet 54'	Stadium: Stade de la Vallée du Cher; Attendance: 3,631; Referee: Amaury Delerue (Aquitaine)

1 August 2009	Angers	0–1	Nîmes	Angers
19:00 CET		Report	Ayité 45'	Stadium: Stade Jean-Bouin; Attendance: 3,548; Referee: Bartolomeu Varela (Brittany)

1 August 2009	Metz	1–0	Bastia	Metz
19:00 CET	Cissé 35' (pen.)	Report		Stadium: Stade Municipal Saint-Symphorien; Attendance: 6,137; Referee: Olivier Husset (Aquitaine)

1 August 2009	Istres	6–1	Strasbourg	Istres
19:00 CET	Begeorgi 13', 26', 38'; Ciaravino 63'; Mesloub 69'; Nouri 84'	Report	Gueye 18'	Stadium: Stade Parsemain; Attendance: 1,170; Referee: Hervé Piccirillo (Île-de-France)

1 August 2009	Troyes	4–0	Nantes	Troyes
19:00 CET	Lafourcade 16'; Buengo 36'; Faussurier 81'; Vieillot 90'	Report		Stadium: Stade de l'Aube; Attendance: 3,763; Referee: Phillipe Chat (Poitou-Charentes)

1 August 2009	Châteauroux	0–1	Clermont	Châteauroux
19:00 CET		Report	Bockhorni 2'	Stadium: Stade Gaston Petit; Attendance: 3,029; Referee: William Lavis (Provence-Alpes-Côte d'Azur)

1 August 2009	Ajaccio	2–1	Laval	Ajaccio
19:00 CET	Viale 45'; Fournier 70'	Report	Do Marcolino 10'	Stadium: Stade François Coty; Attendance: 1,157; Referee: Abdelali Chaoui (Languedoc-Roussillon)

1 August 2009	Amiens	1–1 (a.e.t.) (2–3 p)	Vannes	Amiens
19:00 CET	Haaby 88'	Report	Mezague 65'	Stadium: Stade de la Licorne; Attendance: 2,704; Referee: Dominique Julien (Basse-Normandie)
	Penalties
	Allegro (penalty scored); Gagnier (penalty missed); Lopez-Peralta (penalty scored); Kossoko (penalty missed); Andriatsima (penalty missed)		Faivre (penalty scored); Sammaritano (penalty scored); Mezague (penalty scored); Boudarène (penalty missed)

1 August 2009	Sedan	2–0 (a.e.t.)	Caen	Sedan
20:45 CET	Henaini 92'; Lasimant 106'	Report		Stadium: Stade Louis Dugauguez; Attendance: 3,972; Referee: Saïd Ennjimi (Poitou-Charentes)

Source: LFP

== Second round ==
The 2nd round was played on the 25, 26, and 27 August and featured the ten clubs that successfully advanced from the 1st round.

25 August 2009	Clermont	1–0	Istres	Clermont-Ferrand
19:00 CET	Najih 48'	Report		Stadium: Stade Gabriel Montpied; Attendance: 1,631; Referee: Ludovic Rémy (Nord-Pas-de-Calais)

25 August 2009	Troyes	2–2 (a.e.t.) (0–3 p)	Nîmes	Troyes
19:00 CET	Buengo 35'; Beauvue 73'	Report	Ayité 13', 42'	Stadium: Stade de l'Aube; Attendance: 3,126; Referee: Sébastien Moreira (Pays de la Loire)
	Penalties
	Faussurier (penalty missed); Beauvue (penalty missed); Carlier (penalty missed)		Mostefa (penalty scored); Poulain (penalty scored); Stošić (penalty scored)

25 August 2009	Sedan	6–1	Dijon	Sedan
19:00 CET	Valdivia 2'; Allart 32'; Sidibé 59' (pen.); Tiberi 77', 85'; Mokaké 79'	Report	Carrière 13'	Stadium: Stade Louis Dugauguez; Attendance: 4,889; Referee: Christian Guilliard (Franche-Comté)

26 August 2009	Ajaccio	0–0 (a.e.t.) (5–6 p)	Vannes	Ajaccio
19:00 CET		Report		Stadium: Stade François Coty; Attendance: 1,292; Referee: Jérome Auroux (Midi-Pyrénées)
	Penalties
	Viale (penalty scored); Martins (penalty scored); Fournier (penalty scored); Rivière (penalty scored); Guerriero (penalty missed); Sabo (penalty scored); Kinkela (penalty missed)		Hervé (penalty scored); Kamissoko (penalty scored); Sammaritano (penalty scored); Faivre (penalty scored); Camara (penalty missed); Guillon (penalty scored); Liabeuf (penalty scored)

27 August 2009	Metz	2–1	Tours	Metz
19:00 CET	Bourgeois 67'; Dujeux 82' (o.g.)	Report	Belghazouani 10'	Stadium: Stade Municipal Saint-Symphorien; Attendance: 5,347; Referee: Nicolas Rainville (Languedoc-Roussillon)

Source: LFP

== Third round ==
The 3rd round was played on 22 and 23 September and featured the five clubs that successfully advanced from the 2nd round, the twelve non-exempt Ligue 1 clubs, plus the top three finishers from Ligue 2.

22 September 2009	Clermont	3–1	Vannes	Clermont-Ferrand
20:00 CET	Haquin 9', 45', 81'	Report	Camara 71'	Stadium: Stade Gabriel Montpied; Attendance: 2,485; Referee: Jean-Charles Cailleux (Picardie)

22 September 2009	Lorient	1–0	Grenoble	Lorient
20:45 CET	Gamiero 71'	Report		Stadium: Stade du Moustoir; Attendance: 7,202; Referee: Antony Gautier (Nord-Pas-de-Calais)

23 September 2009	Metz	2–0	Valenciennes	Metz
18:45 CET	Johansen 63' (pen.); C. Gueye 87'	Report		Stadium: Stade Municipal Saint-Symphorien; Attendance: 5,545; Referee: Sébastien Moreira (Franche-Comté)

23 September 2009	Le Mans	3–0	Nîmes	Le Mans
20:00 CET	Lamah 62'; Sène 78'; Maïga 92'	Report		Stadium: Stade Félix-Bollaert; Attendance: 7,331; Referee: Wilfried Bien (Rhône-Alpes)

23 September 2009	Montpellier	3–4 (a.e.t.)	Lens	Montpellier
20:45 CET	Lacombe 12', 45'; Aït-Fana 71'	Report	Maoulida 4'; Sartre 75', 101'; Boukari 88' (pen.)	Stadium: Stade de la Mosson; Attendance: 4,058; Referee: Hervé Piccirillo (Île-de-France)

23 September 2009	Sedan	3–1	Auxerre	Sedan
20:45 CET	Allart 10'; Tibéri 67'; Lasimant 92'	Report	Mignot 60'	Stadium: Stade Louis Dugauguez; Attendance: 5,811; Referee: Pascal Vileo (Aquitaine)

23 September 2009	Saint-Étienne	4–1	Nice	Saint-Étienne
20:45 CET	Bergessio 23', 81'; Sanogo 28'; Landrin 37'	Report	Rémy 85'	Stadium: Stade Geoffroy-Guichard; Attendance: 13,636; Referee: Phillipe Malige (Languedoc-Roussillon)

23 September 2009	Nancy	2–0	Monaco	Nancy
20:45 CET	Féret 13'; Dia 82'	Report		Stadium: Stade Marcel Picot; Attendance: 15,020; Referee: Tony Chapron (Rhône-Alpes)

23 September 2009	Boulogne	0–1	Paris Saint-Germain	Boulogne-sur-Mer
20:45 CET		Report	Maurice 59'	Stadium: Stade de la Libération; Attendance: 5,809; Referee: Bertrand Layec (Brittany)

23 September 2009	Rennes	2–1	Sochaux	Rennes
20:45 CET	Danzé 74'; Mangane 83'	Report	Boudebouz 68'	Stadium: Stade de la Route de Lorient; Attendance: 9,317; Referee: Laurent Duhamel (Basse-Normandie)

Source: LFP

== Round of 16 ==
The Round of 16 was played on 12 January 2010. It featured the five exempt Ligue 1 teams, the ten winners from the 3rd round, and the winner of the 2008–09 Coupe de France. The draw was determined on 25 September. The Le Mans–Bordeaux match was rescheduled to 26 January due to inclement weather.

12 January 2010	Sedan	1–0	Clermont	Sedan
20:00 CET	Allart 57'	Report		Stadium: Stade Louis Dugauguez; Attendance: 3,300; Referee: Bertrand Layec (Brittany)

13 January 2010	Guingamp	1–0	Paris Saint-Germain	Guingamp
17:00 CET	Sakho 79' (o.g.)	Report		Stadium: Stade du Roudourou; Attendance: 5,898; Referee: Tony Chapron (Rhône-Alpes)

13 January 2010	Lyon	3–0	Metz	Lyon
18:45 CET	Toulalan 30'; López 87', 89'	Report		Stadium: Stade de Gerland; Attendance: 20,010; Referee: Damien Ledentu (Languedoc-Roussillon)

13 January 2010	Lens	1–2	Lorient	Lens
19:00 CET	Eduardo 86' (pen.)	Report	Marchal 7'; Gameiro 29'	Stadium: Stade Félix-Bollaert; Attendance: 20,544; Referee: Wilfried Bien (Rhône-Alpes)

13 January 2010	Toulouse	3–0	Nancy	Toulouse
19:00 CET	Macaluso 32' (o.g.); Machado 45' (pen.); Dupuis 47'	Report		Stadium: Stadium Municipal; Attendance: 5,080; Referee: Sébastien Moreira (Franche-Comté)

13 January 2010	Lille	3–1 (a.e.t.)	Rennes	Villeneuve d'Ascq
19:00 CET	Rami 40'; De Melo 96'; Hazard 115'	Report	Pagis 59'	Stadium: Stadium Lille-Metropole; Attendance: 8,943; Referee: Ruddy Buquet (Picardy)

13 January 2010	Saint-Étienne	2–3	Marseille	Saint-Étienne
20:45 CET	Sako 18'; Bergessio 30'	Report	Brandão 28', 50'; Niang 90'	Stadium: Stade Geoffroy-Guichard; Referee: Lionel Jaffredo (Brittany)

26 January 2010	Le Mans	2–3	Bordeaux	Le Mans
20:45 CET	Le Tallec 5'; João Paulo 38'	Report	Gouffran 13'; Gourcuff 36'; Plašil 51'	Stadium: Stade Léon-Bollée; Referee: Bruno Coue (Provence-Alpes-Côte d'Azur)

Source: LFP

== Quarter-finals ==
27 January 2010	Lorient	1–0	Lyon	Lorient
17:00 CET	Gameiro 5'	Report		Stadium: Stade du Moustoir; Attendance: 16,758; Referee: Olivier Thual (Aquitaine)

27 January 2010	Guingamp	0–1	Toulouse	Guingamp
18:45 CET		Report	Ebondo 55'	Stadium: Stade du Roudourou; Attendance: 6,494; Referee: Laurent Duhamel (Basse-Normandie)

27 January 2010	Marseille	2–1	Lille	Marseille
20:45 CET	Lucho 9'; Valbuena 81'	Report	De Melo 4'	Stadium: Stade Vélodrome; Attendance: 19,217; Referee: Hervé Piccirillo (Île-de-France)

2 February 2010	Bordeaux	1–0	Sedan	Bordeaux
18:45 CET	Gouffran 49'	Report		Stadium: Stade Chaban Delmas; Attendance: 9,819; Referee: Stéphane Bre (Brittany)

== Semi-finals ==
3 February 2010	Toulouse	1–2 (a.e.t.)	Marseille	Toulouse
20:45 CET	Gignac 59'	Report	Brandão 86', 105'	Stadium: Stadium Municipal; Attendance: 26,548; Referee: Lionel Jaffredo (Brittany)

17 February 2010	Lorient	1–4	Bordeaux	Lorient
20:45 CET	Koscielny 12'	Report	Wendel 24' (pen.), 80'; Chamakh 29'; Gouffran 89'	Stadium: Stade du Moustoir; Attendance: 14,168; Referee: Clément Turpin (Bourgogne)

== Final ==
27 March 2010
20:50 CET

Marseille	3–1	Bordeaux
Diawara 61'; Valbuena 67'; Chalmé 77' (o.g.)	Report	Sané 83'

Stade de France, Saint-Denis
Attendance: 79,000
Referee: Stéphane Lannoy (Ligue Nord-Pas-de-Calais)

== Topscorer ==
Brandão (4 goals)

== See also ==
- 2009–10 Ligue 1
- 2009–10 Ligue 2
- 2009–10 Championnat National
- 2009–10 Coupe de France
