= Carlier =

Carlier is a Francophone surname. Notable people with the surname include:

- Edmond Carlier (1861–1940), physiologist and entomologist
- Jacky Carlier (born 1961), French athlete
- Joseph Carlier (1849–1927), French sculptor
- Libera Carlier (1926–2007), captain, pilot, and writer
- Modeste Carlier (1820–1878), Belgian painter
- Nicholas Carlier (born 1968), English cricketer
- Pierre Carlier (born 1915), Swiss basketball player
- Rudy Carlier (born 1986), French footballer
- Vincent Carlier (born 1979), French footballer
- Carlier (chess player), active c. 1800

== Fictional ==
- Carlier, a protagonist in Joseph Conrad's story "An Outpost of Progress"

== See also ==
- Carlier Springs
