= Antonio Lopez =

Antonio Lopez may refer to:

== Arts and entertainment ==
- Antonio Lopez (illustrator) (1943–1987), American fashion illustrator
  - Antonio Lopez 1970: Sex Fashion & Disco, 2017 documentary film about the illustrator
- Antonio López García (born 1936), Spanish realist painter and sculptor

== Politicians ==
- Antonio López de Ayala y Velasco, Count of Fuensalida (died 1709), Spanish nobleman and politician
- Antonio López de Santa Anna (1794–1876), Mexican politician (multiple terms as president) and general
- Antonio López Muñoz, 1st Count of López Muñoz (1850–1929), Spanish nobleman and politician
- Antonio López-Istúriz White (born 1970), Spanish politician
- Antonio Xavier López Adame (born 1972), Mexican politician

== Sportspeople ==
- Antonio López Herranz (1913–1959), Spanish football player and manager
- Antonio López (footballer, born 1957), Spanish football defender and manager
- Antonio López Nieto (born 1958), Spanish football referee
- Antonio López (footballer, born 1965), Spanish football forward
- Antonio López (footballer, born 1980), Spanish football midfielder
- Antonio López (footballer, born 1981), Spanish football left-back
- Antonio López (footballer, born May 1989), Mexican football forward
- Antonio López (footballer, born September 1989), Spanish football defender
- Antonio López (footballer, born 1997), Guatemalan football midfielder

== Other ==
- Antonio López, 1st Marquess of Comillas (1817–1883), founder and owner of the Compañía Transatlántica Española and Compañía General de Tabacos de Filipinas
- Antonio López Portillo de Guadalupe (1679–1742), Mexican clergyman and bishop
- Antonio Lopez-Fitzgerald, fictional character in the soap opera Passions
- Antonio López (shipwreck), historic shipwreck of Spanish ship

== See also ==
- Tony Lopez (disambiguation)
- Antony Lopez Peralta (born 1981), French footballer
