= Tony Lopez =

Tony Lopez may refer to:

- Tony Lopez (poet) (born 1950), English poet
- Tony Lopez (boxer) (born 1963), American boxer
- Tony López (soccer) (born 1997), American soccer player
- Tony Lopez, mixed martial artist, a King of the Cage champion
- Tony López, professional wrestler in Consejo Mundial de Lucha Libre tournaments

== See also ==
- Antony Lopez Peralta (born 1981), French footballer
- Antonio Lopez (disambiguation)
- Anthony Lopes (born 1990), Portuguese football goalkeeper
