= Zahibo =

Zahibo is an Ivorian surname. Notable people with the surname include:

- Wesley Zahibo (born 2003), Central African football left-back for Orléans
- Wilfried Zahibo (born 1993), Central African football defensive midfielder for FCM Aubervilliers
