= Previtali =

Previtali is a surname. Notable people with the surname include:

- Andrea Previtali (1480–1528), Italian painter
- Fernando Previtali (1907–1985), Italian conductor
- Lorenzo Previtali (born 2005), Italian short-track speed skater
- Roberto Previtali (born 1981), Italian footballer
- Robin Previtali (born 1987), French footballer
- Sergio Previtali (1939–2007), Uruguayan politician
