= Le Puy-en-Velay FC =

Football club based in Le Puy-en-Velay, France

- Full name: Le Puy-en-Velay Football Club
- Founded: 1903; 123 years ago 2009; 17 years ago (Merged from USF Le Puy and AS Taulhac)
- Ground: Stade Charles Massot, Le Puy-en-Velay
- Capacity: 4,800
- Chairman: Christophe Gauthier
- Manager: Stéphane Dief
- League: Ligue 3
- 2025–26: Championnat National, 7th of 17
- Website: https://lepuyenvelayfc.fr
Home colours	Away colours	Third colours

Le Puy-en-Velay Football Club (commonly known as Le Puy FC) is a French football club based in Le Puy-en-Velay in the Auvergne region. It competes in the Ligue 3, the third tier of French football.

== History ==
Former club crest (until 2017)

The club was founded in 1903 under the name AS Le Puy. Since its foundation, the club has changed its name numerous times and has undergone several mergers. In 1974, the club changed its name to CO Le Puy and, 17 years later, changed its name to SCO Le Puy. The following year, the club changed its name to USF Le Puy.

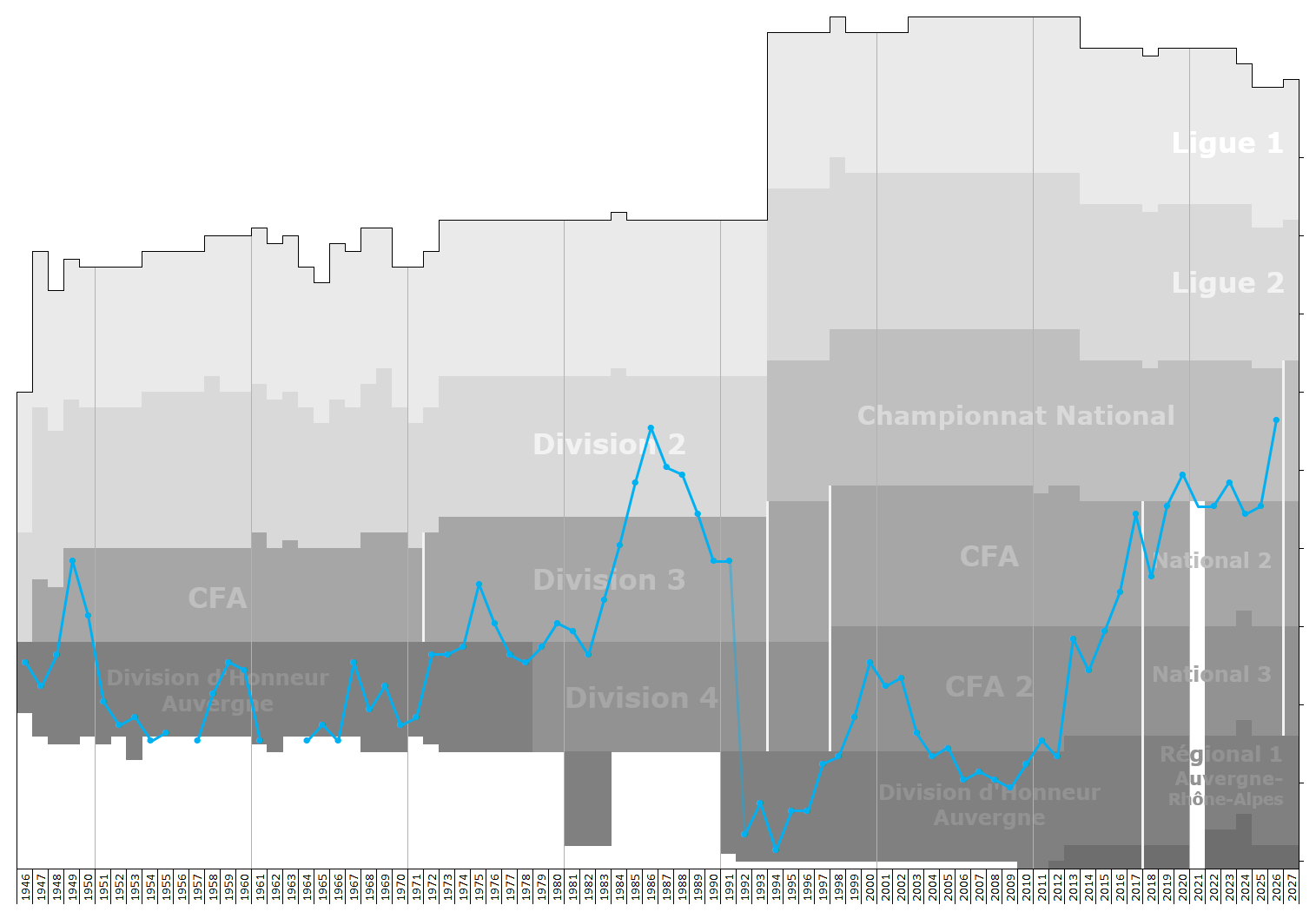
Historical league performance chart of Le Puy Foot 43

In 2009, USF Le Puy merged with another local club, AS Taulhac, to form the club that exists today, then known as Le Puy Foot 43 Auvergne. Despite being an amateur club today, CO Le Puy did have a stint in the professional division of Ligue 2 spending five seasons in the league from 1984 to 1989.

In the 2023-24 Coupe de France, Le Puy Foot 43 Auvergne made it to the cup quarter-final for the first time after beating 2023-24 Ligue 2 side Stade Lavallois 2-1. However, in the quarter-final, Le Puy lost to 2023-24 Ligue 1 side, Stade Rennais 1-3.

On 3 May 2025, Le Puy secured promotion to Championnat National from the 2025-26 season after defeating GOAL FC 0-6 in match week 28 of Championnat National 2 Group A. On 17 March 2026, the club announced a rebrand to Le Puy-en-Velay FC, effective for the start of the 2026–27 season, to better identify which "Le Puy" the club belonged to.

== Current squad ==
As of 5 September 2026 Note: Flags indicate national team as defined under FIFA eligibility rules; some limited exceptions apply. Players may hold more than one non-FIFA nationality.

No.	Pos.	Nation	Player
1	GK	FRA	Matis Carvalho
2	DF	BRA	Vinicius Gomes
3	DF	CIV	Edson Seidou
4	DF	FRA	Ismail Cissé
5	DF	FRA	Mahamadou Dembélé
6	DF	CTA	Wesley Zahibo
7	DF	CIV	Emmanuel Kouassi
8	MF	COM	Raouf Mroivili
9	FW	FRA	Michaël Faty
10	MF	ALB	Renald Xhemo
11	FW	FRA	Marvin Emmanuel
13	DF	ALG	Anis Fatahine (on loan from Paris FC)

No.	Pos.	Nation	Player
14	FW	FRA	Mathis Mazaudier
17	FW	COD	Plamedi Nsingi
18	MF	FRA	Antoine Gauthier
19	DF	FRA	Thomas Ghalem
20	FW	FRA	Florian Boulet
21	MF	FRA	Lilian Baret
23	MF	MTQ	Josselin Gromat
27	MF	FRA	Ilan Ducourtioux (on loan from Lens)
29	FW	FRA	Julien Jacquat
30	GK	FRA	Théo Ramousse
40	GK	FRA	Amaury Roperti
—	DF	MAR	Yazid Aït Moujane

== Notable players ==
- (France) Grégory Coupet (youth)
- (France) Tim Jabol-Folcarelli
- (France) Maxence Rivera
