= Plamedi Nsingi =

Congolese footballer (born 2000)

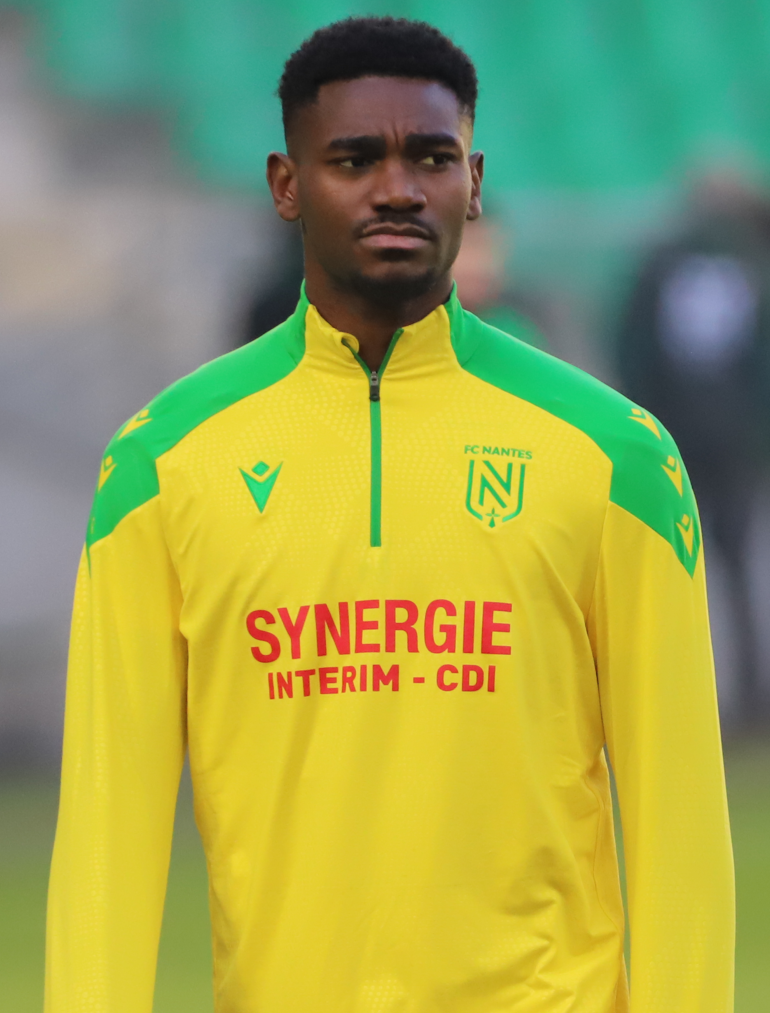
- Nsingi with Nantes in 2025

Personal information
- Full name: Plamedi Nsingi Mbala
- Date of birth: 17 December 2000 (age 25)
- Place of birth: Kinshasa, DR Congo
- Height: 1.89 m (6 ft 2 in)
- Position: Striker

Team information
- Current team: Le Puy
- Number: 24

Senior career*
Years	Team	Apps	(Gls)
2021–2022	AS Audincourt		(19)
2022–2024	Jura Sud	20	(6)
2024–2025	Nantes B	29	(9)
2025	Nantes	1	(0)
2025–	Le Puy	22	(5)

International career
2016	DR Congo U17	3	(3)
2018	DR Congo U20	3	(1)
- * Club domestic league appearances and goals as of 23 June 2026

Plamedi Nsingi Mbala (born 17 December 2000) is a Congolese professional footballer who plays as a striker for Ligue 3 club Le Puy.

== Club career ==
Nsingi played for AS Audincourt in the 2021–22 season, scoring nineteen Régional 1 goals. On 21 October 2021, he scored the opening goal of a 5–1 defeat to Championnat National 2 side Jura Sud in the Coupe de France, catching the attention of the club that would sign him in July 2022. In November 2023, Nsingi completed a trial at Ligue 2 club Annecy, but was ultimately not kept.

=== FC Nantes ===
On 4 January 2024, Nsingi signed his first professional contract with Nantes, initially joining the club's reserve team. On 13 January 2024, he scored his first goal for the reserve team in the first three minutes of his debut match, a 5–0 win over Vertou. On 19 January 2025, Nsingi made his professional debut in Ligue 1, playing in a 1–1 draw away to Saint-Étienne.

== International career ==
Nsingi scored one goal in three appearances for the DR Congo under-20 national team.

== Career statistics ==
As of match played 8 March 2025

Appearances and goals by club, season and competition
Club	Season	League			Cup		Other		Total	
Club	Season	Division	Apps	Goals	Apps	Goals	Apps	Goals	Apps	Goals
Jura Sud	2022–23	CFA 2	12	2	1	0	—		13	2
Jura Sud	2023–24	CFA 2	8	4	0	0	—		8	4
Jura Sud	Total		20	6	1	0	—		21	6
Nantes B	2023–24	National 3	13	5	—		—		13	5
Nantes B	2024–25	National 3	16	4	—		—		16	4
Nantes B	Total		29	9	—		—		29	9
Nantes	2024–25	Ligue 1	1	0	—		—		1	0
Le Puy	2025–26	CFA	0	0	0	0	—		0	0
Career total			50	15	1	0	0	0	51	15
