= Wesley Zahibo =

Central African Republic footballer

Personal information
- Full name: Wesley Gbalou Zahibo
- Date of birth: 6 February 2003 (age 23)
- Place of birth: Baie-Mahault, Guadeloupe, France
- Height: 1.83 m (6 ft 0 in)
- Position: Left-back

Team information
- Current team: Le Puy

Youth career
- 2015–2022: RC Lens

Senior career*
Years	Team	Apps	(Gls)
2021–2024	Lens II	36	(5)
2024–2026	Orléans II	34	(2)
2025–2026	Orléans	1	(0)
2026–	Le Puy	0	(0)

International career^{‡}
2026–	Central African Republic	1	(0)
- * Club domestic league appearances and goals as of 7 June 2026 ‡ National team caps and goals as of 7 June 2026

Wesley Gbalou Zahibo (born 6 February 2003) is a footballer who plays as a left back for Ligue 3 club Le Puy. Born in Guadeloupe, France, he plays for the Central African Republic national team.

== Club career ==
Zahibo joined the RC Lens academy in 2015 at the age of twelve, spending nine years at the club and progressing through the youth ranks before breaking into the reserve side. His development was repeatedly interrupted by serious injuries, including a torn medial ligament in 2022 and a hamstring injury in early 2023 that kept him sidelined for almost a year. He had re-established himself as a starter in the left wing-back role in RC Lens's reserve side under coach Vincent Carlier, but was not offered a new contract at the end of the 2023–24 season.

In July 2024 he signed for US Orléans B, joining the club's reserve side in the Championnat National 3.

== International career ==
Zahibo was born in France, and is of Central African and Ivorian descent. He was called up to the Central African Republic national team for the June 2026 FIFA window and made his debut on 5 June 2026, appearing in the 1–1 international friendly draw against Togo at the Stade El Bachir in Mohammédia, Morocco.
