= Mickaël Stéphan =

French footballer (born 1975)

Personal information
- Full name: Mickaël Stéphan
- Date of birth: December 17, 1975 (age 50)
- Place of birth: Valence, France
- Height: 1.78 m (5 ft 10 in)
- Position: Midfielder

Senior career*
Years	Team	Apps	(Gls)
1998–2004	Valence	160	(2)
2004–2006	Sannois	65	(1)
2006–2011	Angers	151	(1)
2011–2013	Valence	46	(0)
- * Club domestic league appearances and goals

Mickaël Stéphan (born December 17, 1975) is a French retired midfielder.

Stéphan has played in Ligue 2 for ASOA Valence and Angers SCO. (Note: Mickaël Stéphan – French league stats at LFP – also available in French (archived))
