= Antonio Xavier López Adame =

Mexican politician

- Born: 9 December 1972 (age 53); Mexico City, Mexico
- Occupation: Politician
- Political party: PVEM

Antonio Xavier López Adame (born 9 December 1972) is a Mexican politician from the Ecologist Green Party of Mexico. From 2006 to 2009 he served as Deputy of the LX Legislature of the Mexican Congress representing Oaxaca.
