= Didier Paass =

Togolese footballer

Personal information
- Date of birth: 24 June 1982 (age 44)
- Place of birth: Lomé, Togo
- Height: 1.80 m (5 ft 11 in)
- Position: Midfielder

Senior career*
| Years | Team | Apps | (Gls) |
| 2001–2002 | Red Star | 1 | (0) |
| 2002–2005 | Olympique Noisy-le-Sec | 45 | (5) |
| 2005–2006 | TSV Aindling | 26 | (5) |
| 2007–2008 | NK Posušje | 3 | (0) |
| 2008–2009 | Aris Limassol | 0 | (0) |
| 2009–2010 | Amiens | 8 | (0) |
| 2011–2012 | Jura Sud Lavans | 8 | (0) |
| 2012–2013 | SS Saint-Louisienne | 12 | (1) |
| 2013–2014 | Olympique Noisy-le-Sec | 1 | (0) |

International career
| 2006 | Togo | 8 | (0) |
- * Club domestic league appearances and goals

Didier Paass (born 24 June 1982) is a Togolese former professional footballer who played as a midfielder.

== Club career ==
Paass was born in Lomé. He played with French clubs Red Star Saint-Ouen and Olympique Noisy-le-Sec, German TSV Aindling, Bosnian NK Posušje and Aris Limassol in Cyprus. During the season 2009–10 he played with French Championnat National side Amiens SC. In summer 2010 he joined Jura Sud Lavans. In seasons 2012 and 2013 he played at the Réunion Premier League side SS Saint-Louisienne, who became league winners in 2012.

== International career ==
Paass made eight appearances for the Togo national team.
