= Anthony Lippini =

French footballer (born 1988)

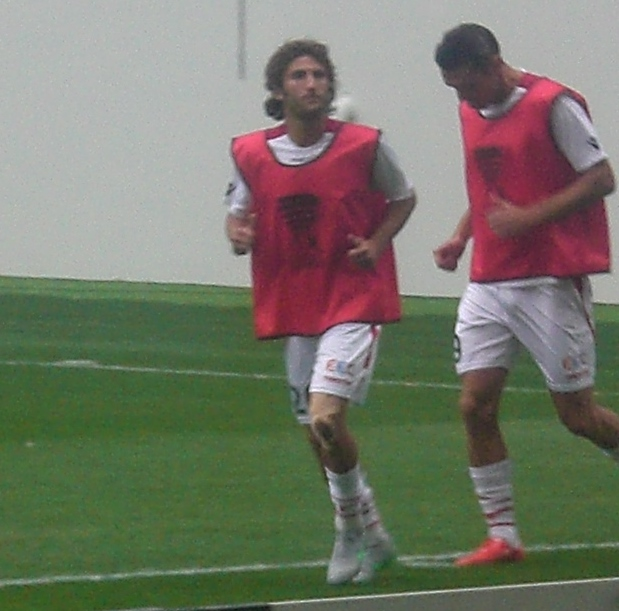
- Lippini (left) in 2015

Personal information
- Date of birth: 7 November 1988 (age 38)
- Place of birth: Bastia, France
- Height: 1.75 m (5 ft 9 in)
- Position: Right-back

Team information
- Current team: Ajaccio (head coach)

Senior career*
Years	Team	Apps	(Gls)
2007–2009	Montpellier	6	(0)
2009–2010	Troyes	6	(0)
2010–2013	Ajaccio	61	(0)
2013–2015	Clermont	31	(0)
2015–2017	Ajaccio	48	(0)
2017–2018	Tours	15	(0)
2018–2019	Tubize	25	(0)
2019–2020	Gazélec Ajaccio	14	(0)
Total		206	(0)

International career
	Corsica	11	(0)

Managerial career
- 2025–: Ajaccio
- * Club domestic league appearances and goals

Anthony Lippini (born 7 November 1988) is a French football manager and former professional player who is the head coach of Régional 2 club Ajaccio. As a player, he played as a right-back for Montpellier, Troyes, Ajaccio, Clermont, Tours, Tubize, and Gazélec Ajaccio.

== Playing career ==
A native of Bastia, Lippini is a Montpellier youth product.

He achieved promotion to Ligue 2 with Troyes in the 2009–10 season.

In 2013 he joined Clermont from Ajaccio, staying at the club until 2015.

In two spells at Ajaccio, he made over 120 appearances, helping the club to Ligue 1 promotion in the 2010–11 season.

He retired in 2020.

== Managerial career ==
On 9 September 2025, Lippini was appointed head coach of his former club Ajaccio, which had just been administratively relegated to the Régional 2, seventh tier of French football.

== Style of play ==
A right-back, Lippini was known for his determination.

== Personal life ==
Lippini is the son of former professional player Bruno Lippini and nephew of coach José Pasqualetti.
