= Chafik Najih =

French footballer (born 1983)

Personal information
- Date of birth: August 5, 1983 (age 43)
- Place of birth: Bourgoin-Jallieu, France
- Height: 1.84 m (6 ft 1/2 in)
- Positions: Striker; attacking midfielder

Senior career*
Years	Team	Apps	(Gls)
2004–2005	CS Bourgoin-Jallieu		
2005–2008	AC Arles		
2008–2010	Clermont Foot	36	(4)
2010–2012	Arles-Avignon	19	(1)
2011	→ US Boulogne (loan)	14	(0)
- * Club domestic league appearances and goals as of 17:08, 13 November 2011 (UTC)

Chafik Najih (born August 5, 1983) is a French professional footballer who played in Ligue 1 for Arles-Avignon.

He holds both French and Moroccan nationalities.
