= Carlier Springs =

Spring in Floyd County, Georgia

Coordinates: 34°12′07″N 85°06′48″W

Carlier Springs is a spring in Floyd County, in the U.S. state of Georgia.

Carlier Springs was named for Louis Carlier, an early settler.
