= Laurent Bernardi =

French football goalkeeper (born 1988)

Personal information
- Date of birth: 9 May 1988 (age 38)
- Place of birth: Ajaccio, France
- Height: 1.77 m (5 ft 9 1/2 in)
- Position: Goalkeeper

Senior career*
Years	Team	Apps	(Gls)
2004–2011	AC Ajaccio	7	(0)
2010	→ Willebroek-Meerhof (loan)	17	(0)
- * Club domestic league appearances and goals

Laurent Bernardi (born 9 May 1988) is a French football goalkeeper.
