= Nicolas Bayod =

French footballer (born 1982)

Personal information
- Full name: Nicolas Gaël Bayod
- Date of birth: 7 March 1982 (age 44)
- Place of birth: Toulouse, France
- Height: 1.79 m (5 ft 10 in)
- Position: Midfielder

Senior career*
Years	Team	Apps	(Gls)
2000–2003	Toulouse (B team)		
2001–2002	Toulouse		
2003–2006	Rodez AF		
2006–2007	Châteauroux	19	(1)
2007–2010	Nîmes	60	(2)
2010–2013	Clermont Foot	85	(4)
- * Club domestic league appearances and goals

Nicolas Gaël Bayod (born 7 March 1982) is a retired French professional footballer. LB Châteauroux, Nîmes Olympique, and Clermont Foot.
