= Sébastien Atlan =

French footballer (born 1984)

Personal information
- Full name: Sébastien Atlan
- Date of birth: 14 November 1984 (age 41)
- Place of birth: Marseille, France
- Height: 1.76 m (5 ft 9 in)
- Position: Defender

Team information
- Current team: Canet Roussillon

Youth career
- 2000–2002: Olympique de Marseille

Senior career*
Years	Team	Apps	(Gls)
2002–2003	Olympique de Marseille	0	(0)
2003–2005	US 1er Canton		
2005–2006	EP Manosque		
2006–2008	Gap FC	56	(5)
2008–2009	Evian Thonon Gaillard	5	(0)
2009–2010	SO Cassis Carnoux	30	(0)
2010–2012	Amiens SC	15	(0)
2012–2014	Paris Saint-Germain B	56	(4)
2014–2017	FC Villefranche	68	(1)
2017–2019	Toulon	49	(1)
2019–	Canet Roussillon	9	(0)
- * Club domestic league appearances and goals as of 23:28, 24 November 2019 (UTC)

Sébastien Atlan (born 14 November 1984) is a French footballer who plays as a defender for Canet Roussillon FC.
