= Adama Touré (footballer) =

Malian footballer

Adama
Personal information
- Full name: Adama Touré
- Date of birth: 28 August 1991 (age 35)
- Place of birth: Bamako, Mali
- Height: 1.84 m (6 ft 0 in)
- Position: Central midfielder

Youth career
- 2007–2009: Stade Malien
- 2009–2010: PSG

Senior career*
Years	Team	Apps	(Gls)
2010–2011	PSG II	16	(4)
2011–2012	Lorient II	7	(0)
2012–2015	Sporting B	75	(6)
2013	Sporting Gijón	1	(0)
2015–2016	Sabadell	13	(0)
2017–2018	Avilés		
2018–2019	SC Schiltigheim	4	(0)

International career
2011	Mali U20	4	(0)
- * Club domestic league appearances and goals as of 08:12, 28 April 2020 (UTC)

Adama Touré (born 28 August 1991), often simply known as Adama, is a Malian professional footballer who plays as a central midfielder.

== Club career ==
Born in Bamako, Adama joined Paris Saint-Germain's youth setup in 2009, after starting with Stade Malien. He made his senior debuts with the reserves in the 2010–11 season. A season later, he signed with Lorient, being assigned to the reserve team in the same category.

On 20 January 2012, Adama signed with Spanish club Sporting de Gijón, being initially assigned to the B-team in Segunda División B. On 25 May of the following year he made his first team debut, playing the last 14 minutes of a 2–1 away loss against SD Huesca, in the Segunda División championship.

On 10 September 2015, free agent Adama signed for CE Sabadell FC, recently relegated to the third tier.

On 27 August 2017, Adama signed for Real Avilés after one year without playing.
