= Rémi Cilia =

French footballer (born 1989)

Personal information
- Date of birth: 11 September 1989 (age 37)
- Place of birth: Ollioules, France
- Height: 1.80 m (5 ft 11 in)
- Position: Defender

Senior career*
Years	Team	Apps	(Gls)
2007–2018	AC Ajaccio B		
2008–2012	AC Ajaccio	14	(0)
2012–2013	Paris FC B	1	(0)
2013–2016	SC Le Las	59	(4)
2016–2017	Toulon	17	(0)
- * Club domestic league appearances and goals as of 20 June 2017 (UTC)

Rémi Cilia (born 11 September 1989) is a French football player who last played for Toulon.
