= Florian Makhedjouf =

Algerian professional footballer (born 1991)

Personal information
- Full name: Florian Adel Makhedjouf
- Date of birth: 11 January 1991 (age 35)
- Place of birth: Ivry-sur-Seine, France
- Height: 1.86 m (6 ft 1 in)
- Position: Midfielder

Youth career
- 2006–2010: Paris Saint-Germain

Senior career*
Years	Team	Apps	(Gls)
2010–2011	Paris Saint-Germain	0	(0)
2011–2013	Sedan	33	(2)
2013–2017	Red Star	107	(11)
2017	Tours	6	(0)
2017–2019	Laval	37	(2)

International career
2009	Algeria U20	1	(0)
- * Club domestic league appearances and goals as of 12:36, 7 December 2020 (UTC)

Florian Adel Makhedjouf (born 11 January 1991) is a professional footballer who plays as a midfielder, most recently for Stade Lavallois. Born in France, he represented Algeria at youth level.

== Club career ==
Makhedjouf began his career at age 6 with local club ES Vitry. The following year he joined US Villejuif where he played until age 13 before spending two seasons with US Ivry. There he was spotted by Pierre Reynaud of Paris Saint-Germain and was signed to the club. In June 2010, he was part of the PSG Under-19 team that won the Under-19 National Championship, beating Monaco 4–2 on penalties in the final.

On 15 December 2010, Makhedjouf made his professional debut for Paris Saint-Germain in a 2010–11 UEFA Europa League group stage match against Karpaty Lviv. He came in as a substitute in the 91st minute in place of Mevlüt Erdinç. At the end of the season, the club announced that Makhedjouf's contract would not be extended and he was free to leave.

=== Sedan ===
On 23 June 2011, Makhedjouf signed a three-year contract with Ligue 2 side CS Sedan Ardennes.

=== Red Star ===
Following Sedan's fall to the lower divisions due to financial problems, Makhedjouf was left a free agent by the end of the 2012–13 season. He then signed with third-tier team Red Star F.C.

== International career ==
On 17 November 2009, Makhedjouf was called up to the Algerian Under-20 national team for a friendly against Tunisia.

== Personal life ==
Makhedjouf was born in Ivry-sur-Seine, France, to an Algerian father and an Italian mother. His father is originally from the town of Aïn Fakroun.
