= Goom Radio =

Internet radio streaming company

- Website type: Internet Radio (International)
- Owner: Goom Radio
- Website: http://www.goomradio.us http://www.goomradio.fr/
- Commercial: Yes
- Registration: Optional
- Launched: March 17, 2009
- Current status: US service discontinued

Goom Radio is a mobile Internet radio service. The Goom Radio Factory allows online broadcasters to create custom online radio brands. It is a free service, available world-wide. A Goom radio application can be downloaded for free on the iPhone, iPod Touch, iPad, BlackBerry, Nokia, and Android.

== History ==
Goom Radio launched in 2008 in France by Emmanuel Jayr and Roberto Ciurleo, former executives at Top 40 network NRJ. In 2010, Jeff Z joined Goom as the Vice President and Director of Programming (August 2010 - March 2011). Prior to Goom Radio, Jeff Z was handling artist management and event production at AMPM Entertainment with previous experience as Program Director for WKTU in New York as well as CBS’s owned radio in California, KZZO. On February 3, 2011, It was announced that due to financial difficulties, the GOOM US workforce had to be laid off. As Of 2014, GOOM Radio's Business To Consumer Service has ceased to exist, Now offers Radio Support Services to Business Clients under a Business to Business Model.

== Product ==
G-Sound is the proprietary technology used to enhance the music on Goom. The lossless audio files are adjusted for range of volume, equalization and the general sound quality.

In addition to delivering content, Goom allows music professionals to choose the music on the central station. On-air personalities, artist interviews and live radio shows are also available.

== Funding ==
Goom Radio is funded from the sale of online streaming and display advertising, in addition to financial backing from the venture capital firms Wellington Partners, Partech International and Elaia Partners. In Spring of 2008, Goom raised $16 million for its funding.

== Premium stations ==
Goom Radio has 16 channels, including Tommy Hilfiger’s "LOUD Radio".

Stations On GOOM US:

- Frenchy Box (French Pop)
- In The Club (Dance)
- Prysm Radio (DJ Clubbing/Dance)
- The Machine by Guitar Hero (Hard Rock)
- Loud Radio (Indie Rock)
- Esquire Radio (Indie Rock)
- Suite 313 (Lounge)

== Similar organizations ==
- Deezer
- iLike
- Last.fm
- MeeMix
- Pandora Radio
- play.it
- Radiolicious
- Slacker Radio
