= Modeste Carlier =

Belgian painter (1820–1878)

- Born: Modeste Carlier ca. 1820; Quaregnon, Belgium
- Died: ca. 1878; Ixelles, Belgium
- Occupation: Painter

Modeste Carlier (1820–1878) was a Belgian portrait and subject painter.

== Life ==
Carlier was born at Quaregnon near Mons in 1820. He was a pupil of Picot. The collection of the Royal Museums of Fine Arts of Belgium includes his picture Locusta Experimenting with Poison on a Slave. He died in Ixelles in 1878.
