= Rémi Fournier =

French footballer (born 1983)

Personal information
- Date of birth: 3 November 1983 (age 43)
- Place of birth: Marseille, France
- Height: 1.90 m (6 ft 3 in)
- Position: Defender

Senior career*
Years	Team	Apps	(Gls)
2001–2006	Endoume Marseille		
2006–2007	Martigues	34	(0)
2007–2010	Ajaccio	102	(2)
2011–2014	Châteauroux	106	(4)
2014–2016	Red Star	66	(3)
2016–2017	Auxerre	18	(1)
- * Club domestic league appearances and goals

Rémi Fournier (born 3 November 1983) is a French former professional footballer who played as a defender.
