= Sébastien Cantini =

French footballer (born 1987)

Personal information
- Date of birth: 31 July 1987 (age 39)
- Place of birth: Martigues, France
- Height: 1.74 m (5 ft 8 1/2 in)
- Position: Right back

Team information
- Current team: ES Fosséenne

Senior career*
Years	Team	Apps	(Gls)
2007–2012	Sedan	84	(1)
2010–2011	→ Vannes OC (loan)	25	(0)
2012–2014	Arles-Avignon	39	(0)
2014–2016	Paris	46	(0)
2015–2016	Paris B	6	(0)
2017–	ES Fosséenne		
- * Club domestic league appearances and goals as of 13:39, 22 September 2015 (UTC)

Sébastien Cantini (born 31 July 1987) is a French professional football player who currently plays as a defender for amateur-side ES Fosséenne . He started his career with CS Sedan Ardennes, and had a loan spell at Vannes OC during the 2010–11 season.
