= Robin Previtali =

French footballer (born 1987)

Personal information
- Date of birth: 5 June 1987 (age 39)
- Place of birth: Besançon, France
- Height: 1.85 m (6 ft 1 in)
- Position: Striker

Team information
- Current team: Vesoul Haute-Saône

Senior career*
Years	Team	Apps	(Gls)
2006–2010	Sochaux	1	(0)
2007–2008	→ AS Beauvais (loan)		
2008–2009	→ CS Louhans-Cuiseaux (loan)		
2009–2010	→ FC Gueugnon (loan)	37	(7)
2010–2012	Naval	17	(1)
2012–2013	US Créteil	5	(0)
2013–	Vesoul Haute-Saône		
- * Club domestic league appearances and goals

Robin Previtali (born 5 June 1987) is a French footballer, who currently plays as a striker for Vesoul Haute-Saône.

== Career ==
Previatali joined Sochaux in 2002 as a youth at the age of 15, and played his first match for the first team in Ligue 1 in the 2006-7 season. (Note: Robin Previtali – French league stats at LFP – also available in French (archived)) Having played in the French Cup in that same season, he received a winner's medal when Sochaux went on to win the cup.
