= Vincent Carlier =

French footballer (born 1979)

Personal information
- Full name: Vincent Carlier
- Date of birth: 20 December 1979 (age 46)
- Place of birth: Paris, France
- Height: 1.81 m (5 ft 11 1/2 in)
- Position: Defender

Team information
- Current team: Lens (assistant)

Youth career
- Guingamp

Senior career*
| Years | Team | Apps | (Gls) |
| 2000–2001 | Angers | 20 | (1) |
| 2001–2002 | Aves | 7 | (1) |
| 2002–2003 | Romorantin | 25 | (1) |
| 2003–2004 | Louhans-Cuiseaux | 31 | (2) |
| 2004–2006 | Sannois | 38 | (0) |
| 2006–2007 | Angers | 4 | (0) |
| 2007–2009 | Beauvais | 41 | (2) |
| 2009–2011 | Troyes | 59 | (1) |
| 2011–2013 | Nîmes | 32 | (0) |
| Total | | 257 | (8) |

Managerial career
- 2013–2015: Nîmes (youth)
- 2015–2018: Troyes (youth)
- 2018–2022: Troyes U19
- 2022–2025: Lens B
- 2025–2026: Lens Espoir
- * Club domestic league appearances and goals

Vincent Carlier (born 20 December 1979) is a French former professional footballer who played as a defender. He is currently the assistant coach of Ligue 1 club Lens.

Carlier spent time at the INF Clairefontaine academy, before moving to Guingamp.

Carlier played professionally in Ligue 2 for Angers SCO, Troyes AC and Nîmes Olympique and in the Segunda Liga for Desportivo Aves.
