= Aurélien Faivre =

French footballer (born 1978)

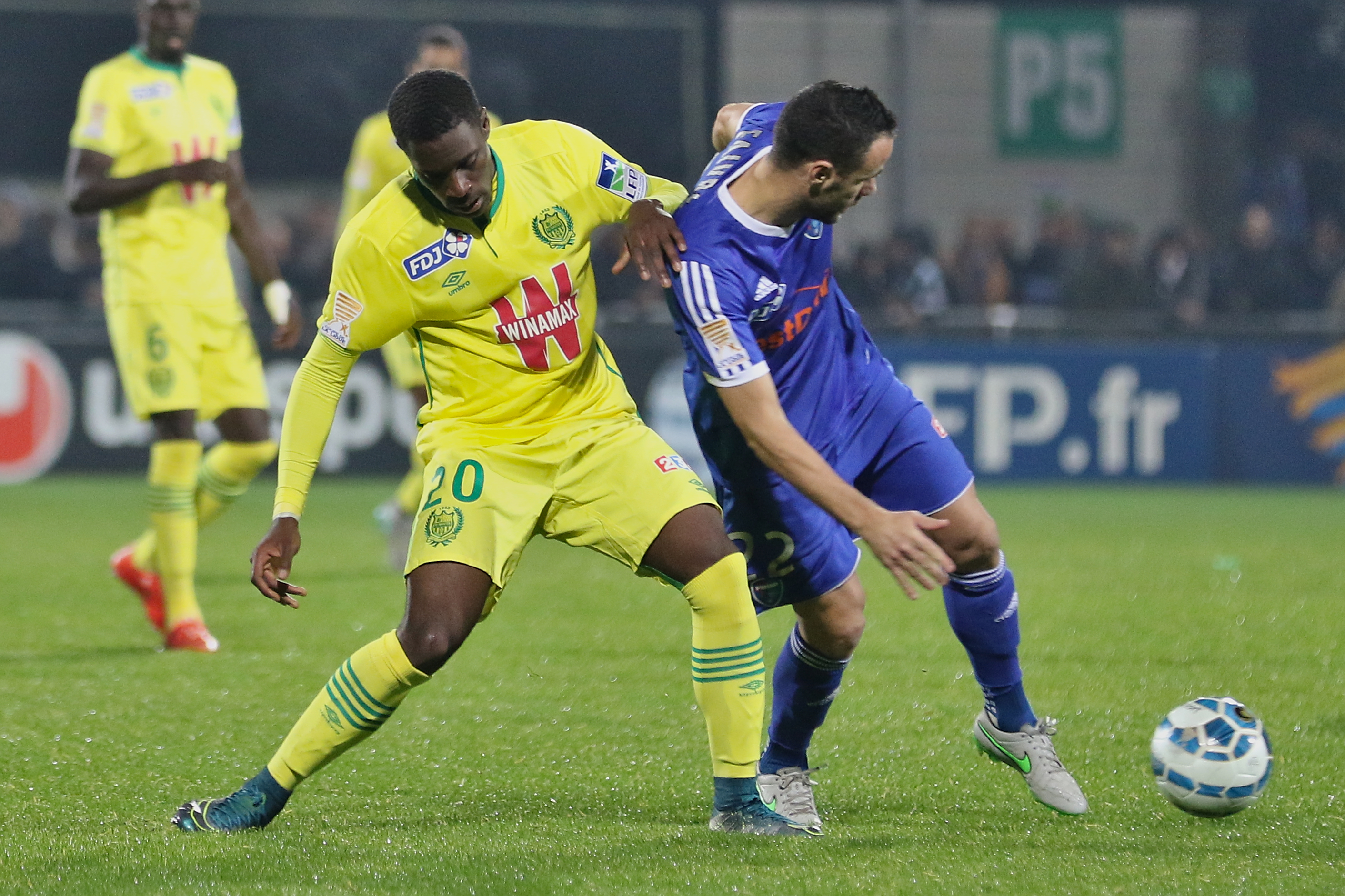
- Faivre (right) with Bourg-en-Bresse in 2015

Personal information
- Date of birth: 22 June 1978 (age 48)
- Place of birth: Besançon, France
- Height: 1.80 m (5 ft 11 in)
- Position: Defender

Youth career
- 1981–1989: Racing Besançon
- 1989–1995: US Saint-Vit
- 1996–1999: Racing Besançon

Senior career*
Years	Team	Apps	(Gls)
1999–2005	Racing Besançon	171	(18)
2005–2006	Nîmes	25	(0)
2006–2008	Libourne	66	(0)
2008–2011	Vannes	65	(2)
2012–2018	Bourg-en-Bresse	134	(9)
2017–2018	Bourg-en-Bresse B	4	(0)
2018–2020	Jura Sud	38	(4)
2020–2022	US Saint-Vit		
Total		503	(33)
- * Club domestic league appearances and goals

Aurélien Faivre (born 22 June 1978) is a French former professional footballer who played as a defender. He played at a professional level in Ligue 2 for Besançon RC, Libourne, and Vannes.
