= Antony Lopez Peralta =

French footballer (born 1981)

Personal information
- Full name: Antony Lopez Peralta
- Date of birth: August 18, 1981 (age 45)
- Place of birth: Royan, France
- Height: 1.70 m (5 ft 7 in)
- Position: Midfielder

Senior career*
Years	Team	Apps	(Gls)
2002–2003	Olympique Alès	31	(0)
2003–2004	FC Istres	3	(0)
2004–2005	Gazélec Ajaccio	35	(3)
2005–2006	AS Cherbourg	26	(2)
2006–2007	Stade Lavallois	34	(4)
2007–2009	Tours FC	48	(3)
2009–2010	Amiens SC	26	(7)
2010–2012	AS Cannes	34	(5)
2012	Red Star	17	(0)
2012–2014	AS Cannes	36	(5)
- * Club domestic league appearances and goals as of 12 March 2017 (UTC)

Antony Lopez Peralta (born August 18, 1981) is a French former professional footballer who played as a central midfielder.

== Career ==
He signed for Championnat National side Amiens SC in the summer of 2009 from Tours FC. On 13 May 2010 Championnat National club AS Cannes signed the midfielder from Amiens SC.
