= 2009–10 Paris Saint-Germain FC season =

37th season in existence of Paris Saint-Germain

Paris Saint-Germain
2009–10 season
- President: Robin Leproux
- Head coach: Antoine Kombouaré
- Stadium: Parc des Princes
- Ligue 1: 13th
- Coupe de France: Winners
- Coupe de la Ligue: Round of 16
- Top goalscorer: League: Mevlüt Erdinç (15); All: Mevlüt Erdinç (19)
- Highest home attendance: 44,778 vs Lyon (20 September 2009)
- Lowest home attendance: 13,395 vs Aubervilliers (10 January 2010)
- Average home league attendance: 35,114
Home colours	Away colours

The 2009–10 season was French football club Paris Saint-Germain's 37th professional season, their 37th season in Ligue 1 and their 36th consecutive season in French top-flight. PSG was managed by Antoine Kombouaré. The club was chaired by Robin Leproux. Paris Saint-Germain was present in the Ligue 1, the Coupe de France and the Coupe de la Ligue. Paris Saint-Germain's average home gate was 33,266, the fourth highest in Ligue 1.

A few weeks before the end of his short term as president of Paris Saint-Germain, Sébastien Bazin, chair of the club's supervisory board and head of Colony Capital in Europe, outlined clear objectives for the club, particularly for Robin Leproux, the future president, and Antoine Kombouaré, the incoming manager. Bazin expressed his expectations for Antoine Kombouaré's upcoming managerial tenure, as well as his reasons for not appointing Alain Roche director of football. He also indicated that Colony Capital, PSG's majority shareholder, remained committed to the club's development plan three years after its partial takeover. The U.S. investment firm had a six-year vision to transform Paris Saint-Germain into an economically profitable and successful football club. Bazin stated that PSG began the season with the goal of reclaiming its European status:

We want Paris Saint-Germain to advance steadily. We must be capable in the medium term to sustain €15-20 million of additional revenue from our current turnover. With a budget of €100-100m, we could have a team capable of sustained play in the UEFA Champions League. We must do a better season this year, PSG deserves to be in the Champions League next season. Antoine will qualify for a European Cup, but not necessarily the Champions League. The shareholders are right to increase their expectations. The relationship between Antoine and Alain has been historically very close and we didn't want to put a hierarchy between them. It would be awkward.

— Sébastien Bazin, 31 July 2009

== News ==
Paris Saint-Germain and Valenciennes reached a final agreement which allowed Antoine Kombouaré to join as first team coach for the next three seasons with an option for a fourth. Zoumana Camara signed a new one-year contract extension until 2012. Loris Arnaud signed a new two-year contract extension until 2012. Nicolas Dehon replaced Christian Mas as goalkeeping coach. Yves Bertucci committed to Paris Saint-Germain for one year as Antoine Kombouaré's assistant coach. Guillaume Hoarau signed an extension to his current contract until 2013. Colony Capital acquired all the shares of Morgan Stanley and became 95% owners of Paris Saint-Germain. Claude Makélélé signed a new one-year contract extension until 2010. Stéphane Sessègnon signed a one-year contract until 2013. Ceará penned a new deal until 2012. Sylvain Armand signed a new deal until 2012. PSG president Sébastien Bazin announced that Robin Leproux joined the club's board of directors. Péguy Luyindula signed a new two-year contract extension until 2012. Robin Leproux replaced Sébastien Bazin and became the new president of Paris Saint-Germain. Granddi Ngoyi penned a new three-year deal until 2013. Paris mayor Bertrand Delanoë announced that the Parc des Princes would be renovated to host the UEFA Euro 2016.

The club launched the Passion PSG membership, a relationship program unique in French football to strengthen the sense of community among their supporters. Younousse Sankharé signed a two-year extension until 2012. Paris Saint-Germain's eagerly-anticipated encounter with Olympique de Marseille was postponed after two club players had contracted swine flu. Ludovic Giuly and Mamadou Sakho were the first to be infected, before Jérémy Clément picked up the H1N1 virus. Robin Leproux announced his intentions of reviving the Tournoi de Paris for the 2010–11 season on the occasion of the club's 40th Anniversary. Claude Makélélé announced his retirement from professional football at the end of the season. Yann L., a Paris Saint-Germain fan injured in a fight between rival factions of hooligans from the club, was left in a life-threatening coma ahead of the league match between fierce rivals PSG and Marseille. The clashes involved hooligans from the two main stands at the Parc des Princes, the Tribune d'Auteuil and the Kop of Boulogne. Boulogne Boys member Yann L. was attacked by another PSG group, the Supras Auteuil.

OM fans had boycotted the match to protest against security measures imposed on visiting supporters. After several months of relative tranquility, Boulogne and Auteuil fans, angered by their team's poor results and a mutual opposition to the club's chief backer, Colony Capital, started fighting again at the end of last year and clashed violently at Lille in January. Robin Leproux reported the club would not make available tickets to their fans for away games until further notice. Yann L. died in the hospital after being in a coma since 28 February. The LFP announced that PSG would play their next three fixtures behind closed doors. Laurent Perpère and Francis Graille, two former presidents of Paris Saint-Germain, were handed suspended jail sentences and fines over a series of suspect transfers between 1998 and 2003. Perpère was given an 18-month suspended sentence and a 40,000-euros fine, while Graille received a one-year suspended sentence and a €20,000 fine. They set up the illegal scheme which included players, agents and Nike France. Nike France and PSG were respectively fined €120,000 and €150,000 for their part in the operation.

French Prime Minister François Fillon and Interior Minister Brice Hortefeux disbanded five PSG ultras supporters groups in light of the violence at the Parc des Princes. From the Tribune d'Auteuil, the groups Supras Auteuil 1991, Paris 1970 la Grinta and Les Authentiks were dissolved. At the other end of the pitch, the Kop of Boulogne lost Commando Loubard and Milice Paris. Once again, however, it was unclear how this would result in anything different regarding violence in the stands. Technically, the Boulogne Boys were banned in 2008, but most of their members have simply infiltrated other groups in the Kop of Boulogne. The Tournoi de Paris was officially confirmed for 2010. Tribune de Auteuil supporters called for a "peaceful march" in protest against the new anti-violence plan which was being set up by the club management. The majority shareholder of PSG and the supervisory board of the club extended the tenure of president Robin Leproux until 2013. The LFP announced the classification of training centers for the 2009–10 season. Paris Saint-Germain was ranked 11th, but at the forefront of the list regarding the selection of club-grown players.

== Transfers ==
In

No.	Pos.	Nat.	Name	Age	EU	Moving from	Type	Transfer window	Ends	Transfer fee	Source
29	CM	(France)	Abdelaziz Barrada	20	EU	Youth system	Signed Pro	Summer	2010		PSG.fr
24	LM	(France)	Tripy Makonda	19	EU	Youth system	Signed Pro	Summer	2012		PSG.fr
—	CB	(France)	Alassane També	17	EU	Youth system	Signed Pro	Summer	2012		PSG.fr
16	GK	(France)	Alphonse Areola	16	EU	Youth system	Signed Pro	Summer	2012		PSG.fr
—	FW	(France)	Jimmy Kamghain	17	EU	Youth system	Signed Pro	Summer	2012		PSG.fr
11	FW	(Turkey)	Mevlüt Erdinç	22	EU	Sochaux	Signed	Summer	2013	€9m	PSG.fr
1	GK	(France)	Grégory Coupet	36	EU	Atlético Madrid	Signed	Summer	2011	€1m	PSG.fr
26	RB	(France)	Christophe Jallet	25	EU	Lorient	Signed	Summer	2013	€2.5m	PSG.fr
16	GK	(France)	Willy Grondin	34	EU	Valenciennes	Signed	Summer	2010	Free	PSG.fr
14	FW	(Serbia)	Mateja Kežman	30	EU	Fenerbahçe (Turkey)	Signed	Summer	2011	€3.7m	
12	DM	(Cameroon)	Albert Baning	24	Non-EU	Grenoble	Loan Return	Summer	2010		
19	FW	(Brazil)	Éverton Santos	22	Non-EU	Fluminense (Brazil)	Loan Return	Summer	2010		Foot Mercato
29	FW	(France)	Yannick Boli	21	EU	Le Havre	Loan Return	Summer	2010		
17	DM	(France)	Granddi Ngoyi	21	EU	Clermont	Loan Return	Summer	2013		
27	LM	(France)	Younousse Sankharé	19	EU	Reims	Loan Return	Summer	2012		
19	FW	(Brazil)	Éverton Santos	23	Non-EU	Albirex Niigata (Japan)	Loan Return	Winter	2012		Foot Mercato
14	FW	(Serbia)	Mateja Kežman	30	EU	Zenit St. Petersburg (Russia)	Loan Return	Winter	2011		PSG.fr

Total spending: ▼€16.2 million

Out

No.	Pos.	Nat.	Name	Age	EU	Moving to	Type	Transfer window	Transfer fee	Source
25	LM	(France)	Jérôme Rothen	31	EU	Rangers (Scotland)	Loaned	Summer		PSG.fr
19	FW	(Brazil)	Éverton Santos	22	Non-EU	Albirex Niigata (Japan)	Loaned	Summer		PSG.fr
14	FW	(Serbia)	Mateja Kežman	30	EU	Zenit St. Petersburg (Russia)	Loaned	Summer		PSG.fr
17	CB	(Democratic Republic of the Congo)	Larrys Mabiala	21	EU	Nice	Contract Ended	Summer	Free	PSG.fr
10	AM	(Brazil)	Souza	30	Non-EU	Grêmio (Brazil)	Transferred	Summer	€2m	PSG.fr
1	GK	(France)	Mickaël Landreau	30	EU	Lille	Transferred	Summer	€1.6m	Mercafutbol
29	DM	(Democratic Republic of the Congo)	Youssuf Mulumbu	22	EU	West Bromwich Albion (England)	Transferred	Summer	€0.2m	Mirror Football
16	GK	(France)	Stéphane Véron	23	EU	Belfort (France)	Contract Ended	Summer	Free	
12	FW	(France)	Fabrice Pancrate	29	EU	Newcastle United (England)	Contract Ended	Summer	Free	
19	FW	(France)	Gaëtan Charbonnier	20	EU	Angers	Contract Ended	Summer	Free	PSG MAG
29	FW	(France)	Yannick Boli	22	EU	Nîmes	Transferred	Winter	undisclosed	PSG.fr
18	FW	(France)	Loris Arnaud	22	EU	Clermont	Loaned	Winter		PSG.fr
12	DM	(Cameroon)	Albert Baning	24	Non-EU	Strasbourg	Loaned	Winter		PSG.fr
25	LM	(France)	Jérôme Rothen	31	EU	MKE Ankaragücü (Turkey)	Loaned	Winter		Total Football Forums
6	CB	(France)	Grégory Bourillon	25	EU	Lorient	Transferred	Winter	€1.7m	PSG.fr
19	FW	(Brazil)	Éverton Santos	23	Non-EU	Goiás	Loaned	Winter		Foot Mercato

Total income: ▲€5.48 million

== Squad information ==
N	Pos.	Nat.	Name	Age	EU	Since	App	Goals	Ends	Transfer fee	Notes
1	GK	(France)	Grégory Coupet	37	EU	2009	0	0	2011	€1m	
2	RB	(Brazil)	Ceará	29	Non-EU	2007	91	1	2012	€2.5m	
3	CB	(France)	Mamadou Sakho	20	EU	2006	52	1	2012	Youth system	
4	DM	(France)	Claude Makélélé (captain)	37	EU	2008	40	0	2010	Free	
6	CB	(France)	Grégory Bourillon	25	EU	2007	48	0	2011	€3m	
7	RW	(France)	Ludovic Giuly	33	EU	2008	42	9	2011	€2.5m	
8	FW	(France)	Péguy Luyindula	30	EU	2006	107	21	2012	€2.5m	
9	FW	(France)	Guillaume Hoarau	26	EU	2008	47	20	2013	€0.5m	
10	AM	(Benin)	Stéphane Sessègnon	25	Non-EU	2008	49	7	2013	€8m	
11	FW	(Turkey)	Mevlüt Erdinç	23	EU	2009	0	0	2013	€9m	
12	DM	(Cameroon)	Albert Baning	25	Non-EU	2006	4	0	2010	€1m	
13	CB	(Mali)	Sammy Traoré	34	EU	2006	63	4	2010	€1.5m	
14	FW	(Serbia)	Mateja Kežman	31	EU	2008	35	8	2011	€3.7m	
15	CB	(France)	Zoumana Camara	31	EU	2007	98	1	2012	€6m	
16	GK	(France)	Willy Grondin	35	EU	2009	0	0	2010	Free	
17	RM	(France)	Granddi Ngoyi	21	EU	2007	13	0	2013	Youth system	
18	FW	(France)	Loris Arnaud	23	EU	2007	28	4	2012	Youth system	
20	CM	(France)	Clément Chantôme	22	EU	2006	104	2	2010	Youth system	
21	FW	(Haiti)	Jean-Eudes Maurice	23	EU	2008	1	0	2012	Youth system	
22	LB	(France)	Sylvain Armand	29	EU	2004	242	7	2012	€3.5m	
23	DM	(France)	Jérémy Clément	25	EU	2006	107	3	2012	€2.2m	
24	LM	(France)	Tripy Makonda	20	EU	2008	8	0	2012	Youth system	
25	LM	(France)	Jérôme Rothen	32	EU	2004	181	13	2011	€10.5m	
26	RB	(France)	Christophe Jallet	26	EU	2009	0	0	2013	€2.5m	
27	LM	(France)	Younousse Sankharé	20	EU	2007	21	0	2012	Youth system	
30	GK	(Armenia)	Apoula Edel	23	EU	2008	4	0	2011	€0.12m	

== Kit ==
Nike manufactured the kits for Paris Saint-Germain and the airline Emirates continued to be the club's main sponsor. Nike have been PSG's official kit provider since 1989. Emirates have been the club's partner since 2005 and the major shirt sponsor since January 2006. PSG were handed brand new home and away kits. The home shirt was mainly PSG's traditional home colours of Navy Blue. Red pinstripes ran down the shirt and sleeves. The collar and ends of the sleeves were red, dropping the club's 'historical' shirt and causing some controversy amongst the fans, as it strayed away from the more traditional blue shirt with a central red vertical stripe trimmed with white. The away shirt was mostly white. The shirt featured a blue and red polkadot pattern around the whole shirt. There was a red piping around the ends of the sleeves and collars. The shirts had the club badge on the top-left, the Nike logo on the top-right and the club sponsor Fly Emirates written across the middle.

Home	Away

== Board and staff ==
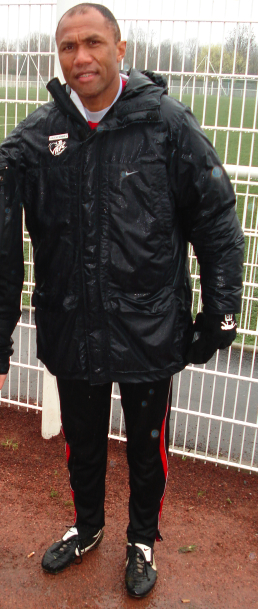
Antoine Kombouaré

Head coach	Antoine Kombouaré
Assistant coach	Yves Bertucci
Goalkeeping coach	Nicolas Dehon
Physical trainer	Raphaël Févre
Head doctor	Éric Rolland
Physiotherapists	Bruno Le Natur, Joël Le Hir, Pascal Roche

Source: PSG.fr

President	Robin Leproux
General Manager	Phillipe Boindrieux
Communications	Bruno Skropeta
Recruitment	Alain Roche
Amateur Section	Simon Tahar
Academy Director	Bertrand Reuzeau
Ground (capacity and dimensions)	Parc des Princes (48,712 / 252m x 191m)

Source: Ligue 1

== Friendly matches ==
Just like last season, Paris Saint-Germain opened their pre-season campaign with a victory over Pontivy. Christophe Jallet and Grégory Coupet both made their debuts in the famous red and blue colours. PSG encountered few problems against Nantes, relegated from the French top-flight last season, with defender Sammy Traoré nodding "Les Parisiens" in front from a Clément Chantôme free-kick before Serbian striker Mateja Kežman made sure of victory shortly before half-time. Just two weeks before the start of the Ligue 1 season, PSG continued their pre-season preparation with a draw against a physical Greek side from Panthrakikos. Invited by Italian outfit Fiorentina, PSG attended the Memorial Artemio Franchi and stole the show scoring three unanswered goals, including Mevlüt Erdinç's first goal for new club Paris Saint-Germain, confirming that Antoine Kombouaré's squad was in tip top form just ten days from the start of the campaign. Paris attended Arsenal's Emirates Cup for the second time and suffered their first of the pre-season at the hands of Rangers in their opening match. New striker Mevlüt Erdinç, a 10 million signing from Sochaux, spurned a host of first-half chances for "Les Parisiens", who found themselves on the back foot for much of the first period. Paris Saint-Germain showed great character in coming back to equalize while playing a man down against Atlético Madrid in the second day of the tournament. The pre-season lived up to all its promise and was certainly a positive outing for Antoine Kombouaré's side.

Paris Saint-Germain prepared for the trip to Marseille in style with a win over Portuguese leaders Sporting Braga. The match was notable for Zoumana Camara gracing the Parc des Princes for the first time in the season after recovering from phlebitis. Clément Chantôme scored the opening two PSG goals and laid on an assist for Yannick Boli to add a late third. PSG was involved in a friendly match ahead of French Cup action, the men from the capital doing their coach proud with four unanswered goals against Ligue 2 side Vannes. Ludovic Giuly broke the deadlock and Vannes's Patrick Leugueun scored an own goal before Jean-Eudes Maurice added a third. Mevlüt Erdinç rounded out the scoring. Paris Saint-Germain announced their participation in the Chicago Sister Cities International Cup. After a season in which they disappointed in Ligue 1 but won the French Cup for the eighth time, Antoine Kombouaré's side flew to New York City for a short visit before heading to Chicago for the tournament against Legia Warsaw, Red Star Belgrade and hosts Chicago Fire. A narrow win against Chicago Fire took them through to a final meeting with Serbian league runners-up Red Star Belgrade. Paris Saint-Germain brought the curtain down on their end-of-season US tour with a defeat on penalties against Red Star Belgrade in the final of the Sister Cities Cup.

=== Matches ===
11 July 2009 Friendly	Pontivy	0–2	Paris Saint-Germain	Sarzeau
19:00			Giuly 21'; Boli 49'	Stadium: Stade de Sarzeau; Attendance: 3,000; Referee: Stéphane Bré

14 July 2009 Friendly	Nantes	0–2	Paris Saint-Germain	Saint-Dolay
19:00			Traoré 20'; Kežman 38'	Stadium: Stade de la Longe; Attendance: 2,150; Referee: Sébastien Denis

23 July 2009 Friendly	Paris Saint-Germain	1–1	Panthrakikos	Évry-Bondoufle
20:00	Ngoyi 12'		Arsenijević 28'	Stadium: Stade Robert-Bobin; Attendance: 6,000; Referee: Bertrand Layec

29 July 2009 Memorial Artemio Franchi	Fiorentina	0–3	Paris Saint-Germain	Florence, Italy
20:30			Erding 24'; Giuly 33'; Luyindula 50'	Stadium: Stadio Artemio Franchi; Attendance: 8,765; Referee: Gianluca Rocchi (Italy)

1 August 2009 Emirates Cup	Rangers	1–0	Paris Saint-Germain	London, England
15:00	Bougherra 77'			Stadium: Emirates Stadium; Attendance: 10,000; Referee: Alan Kelly (Ireland)

2 August 2009 Emirates Cup	Atlético Madrid	1–1	Paris Saint-Germain	London, England
15:00	Agüero 40'		Giuly 71'; Baning (red card) 81'	Stadium: Emirates Stadium; Attendance: 50,000; Referee: Alan Wiley (England)

14 November 2009 Friendly	Paris Saint-Germain	3–1	Braga	Paris
14:30	Chantôme 25', 88'; Boli 90'		Rodríguez 28'	Stadium: Parc des Princes; Attendance: 4,000

5 January 2010 Friendly	Vannes	0–4	Paris Saint-Germain	La Baule-Escoublac
18:30			Giuly 2'; Leugueun 29' (o.g.); Maurice 38'; Erdinç 41'	Stadium: Stade Moreau Desfarges; Attendance: 830; Referee: Jérémie Bernard

19 May 2010 CSCIC	Chicago Fire	0–1	Paris Saint-Germain	Bridgeview, United States
19:00			Chantome 14'	Stadium: Toyota Park; Attendance: 9,254; Referee: Chris Penzo (United States)

22 May 2010 CSCIC	Red Star Belgrade	1–1 (7–6 p)	Paris Saint-Germain	Bridgeview, United States
21:00	Cadú 73'		Ceará 90'	Stadium: Toyota Park; Attendance: 12,354; Referee: Landis Wiley (United States)

== Competitions ==
=== Ligue 1 ===
An injury-time goal from Emir Spahić earned 10-man new boys Montpellier a dramatic draw at home to Paris Saint-Germain on the opening day of the season. Antoine Kombouaré's men notched their first win against Le Mans thanks to goals from Mevlüt Erdinç and Ludovic Giuly. Paris Saint-Germain coach Antoine Kombouaré made a winning return to former club Valenciennes as his side took all three points. Paris Saint-Germain kept themselves up with Ligue 1's leading pack with a home win over struggling Lille. In a frenetic final ten minutes that saw two goals and the expulsion of PSG's Stéphane Sessègnon, AS Monaco secured a dramatic win over the capital club at the Stade Louis II. Substitute Bafétimbi Gomis swooped to grab an equalizer five minutes from time as Olympique Lyonnais maintained their unbeaten start to the season with a draw at Paris Saint-Germain. Guillaume Hoarau found the net for the first time this season as Paris Saint-Germain picked up a point with a draw at Lorient. Paris Saint-Germain's bright start to the season is now a fading memory as Antoine Kombouaré's men stuttered to a third successive league draw as they were held by Nancy. Albin Ebondo's strike was enough for hosts Toulouse to edge out Paris Saint-Germain. Mevlüt Erdinç returned to former club Sochaux and scored PSG's third but also missed a first-half penalty as the capital club won for the first time since Week 4. A late goal on the counter-attack from Loïc Rémy allowed Nice to snatch three points from their trip to face Paris Saint-Germain. Gabriel Heinze's header was enough for Olympique de Marseille to take the honours in the rescheduled Clasico, dominating a struggling Paris Saint-Germain to climb to fourth place.

Auxerre's winning run was ended at seven after Jérémy Clément gave Paris Saint-Germain all three points at the Parc des Princes. Paris Saint-Germain scored four times in the space of nine minutes after the break on their way to a win over struggling Boulogne. Bordeaux stretched their lead at the top of Ligue 1 to four points with a victory over Paris Saint-Germain after Jaroslav Plašil headed home Benoît Trémoulinas's cross. A scintillating first-half display from Paris Saint-Germain gave them a win over Saint-Étienne to compound "Les Verts'" current problems. Lens came away from the French capital with a valuable point after holding Paris Saint-Germain to a draw with both goals coming in a frenetic four-minute spell in the second-half. Ismaël Bangoura's strike was enough for Rennes to convert their domination over Paris into three points and climb to provisional fourth place on the Ligue 1 table. A strong Paris Saint-Germain side piled more misery on Grenoble at the Parc des Princes, but the scoreline was harsh on a visiting side that were on top for long spells and hit the woodwork twice. Lille romped to a seventh successive Ligue 1 victory in their win over Paris Saint-Germain. An own goal from 'keeper Apoula Edel handed a precious three points to Monaco when the two sides fought out a frenetic league encounter at the Parc des Princes. Mevlüt Erdinç fired Paris Saint-Germain in front but Mamadou Sakho's red card changed everything and Bafétimbi Gomis and Cris struck Lyon's second half goals. Lorient improved their already impressive record in the capital as they outclassed struggling Paris Saint-Germain to condemn their hosts to a fourth successive league defeat. Antoine Kombouaré's men managed to avoid a fifth consecutive league loss as they drew in Nancy in a cagey match that saw both sides taking no risks in the search of a winner. Guillaume Hoarau scored for the first time since September as Paris Saint-Germain recorded a morale-boosting win over ten-man Toulouse at the Parc des Princes. Marseille enjoyed their biggest ever win at the Parc des Princes over Paris Saint-Germain.

Stéphane Sessègnon popped up four minutes into injury time to snatch a draw for troubled Paris Saint-Germain at Lens, after Sébastien Roudet's strike was set to hand the hosts all three points. Mevlüt Erdinç gave the striking Paris fans something to sing about as his hat-trick against former club Sochaux led PSG to a comprehensive win at the Parc des Princes. Loïc Rémy's late strike proved enough for Nice to beat Paris Saint-Germain behind closed doors at the Stade du Ray. Paris Saint-Germain were playing their third match in a week behind closed doors, but they made light work of ten-man Boulogne at the Parc des Princes. Auxerre missed out on the opportunity to ease clear of their title rivals at the top of the Ligue 1 table as they were held by a battling Paris Saint-Germain side. Bordeaux suffered a second major setback in a week, beaten at Paris Saint-Germain after veteran back-up goalkeeper Ulrich Ramé was sent off. Defence was the order of the day as a new-look PSG line-up managed a scoreless draw with a 17th-placed Saint-Étienne side. Paris Saint-Germain had to settle for a point at the Parc des Princes after the woodwork came to Rennes' rescue three times in the latter stages. Grenoble thumped Cup finalists Paris Saint-Germain at the Stade des Alpes with two goals in each half. Mateja Kežman's late strike looked to have secured all three points for PSG against Valenciennes, but Fahid Ben Khalfallah's reply a minute later rescued the draw. Ligue 2-bound Le Mans recorded their first-ever home victory over Paris Saint-Germain in the top-flight thanks to an early own-goal from Sylvain Armand. Montpellier booked a Europa League spot with a win at the Parc des Princes, while PSG finished 13th.

==== League table ====
Pos	Team	Pld	W	D	L	GF	GA	GD	Pts	Qualification or relegation
11	Lens	38	12	12	14	40	44	−4	48	
12	Nancy	38	13	9	16	46	53	−7	48	
13	Paris Saint-Germain	38	12	11	15	50	46	+4	47	Qualification to Europa League play-off round (Note: Coupe de France winners Paris Saint-Germain qualify for the 2010–11 UEFA Europa League Play-off round of 2010–11 UEFA Europa League.)
14	Toulouse	38	12	11	15	36	36	0	47	
15	Nice	38	11	11	16	41	57	−16	44	

Source: Ligue 1
Rules for classification: 1) points; 2) goal difference; 3) number of goals scored.

==== Results summary ====
Overall								Home						Away					
Pld	W	D	L	GF	GA	GD	Pts	W	D	L	GF	GA	GD	W	D	L	GF	GA	GD
38	12	11	15	50	46	+4	47	9	5	5	32	20	+12	3	6	10	18	26	−8

Source: Ligue 1

==== Results by round ====
Round	1	2	3	4	5	6	7	8	9	10	11	12	13	14	15	16	17	18	19	20	21	22	23	24	25	26	27	28	29	30	31	32	33	34	35	36	37	38
Ground	A	H	A	H	A	H	A	H	A	A	H	A	H	A	H	A	H	A	H	A	H	A	H	A	H	H	A	H	A	H	A	H	A	H	A	H	A	H
Result	D	W	W	W	L	D	D	D	L	L	D	W	L	W	W	L	W	L	W	L	L	L	L	D	W	L	D	W	L	W	D	W	D	D	L	D	L	L
Position	11	5	3	2	5	6	6	7	9	13	13	11	12	10	10	11	9	10	8	10	11	14	15	14	12	12	14	12	12	11	12	11	11	11	11	11	11	13

Source: Ligue 1
A = Away; H = Home; W = Win; D = Draw; L = Loss

==== Matches ====
8 August 2009 1	Montpellier	1–1	Paris Saint-Germain	Montpellier
21:00	Spahić 90'		Giuly 71'	Stadium: Stade de la Mosson; Attendance: 29,312; Referee: Bertrand Layec

15 August 2009 2	Paris Saint-Germain	3–1	Le Mans	Paris
19:00	Erdinç 79'		Helstad 21'	Stadium: Parc des Princes; Attendance: 30,558; Referee: Philippe Malige

22 August 2009 3	Valenciennes	2–3	Paris Saint-Germain	Valenciennes
19:00	Tiéné 59'; Mater 90+1'		Luyindula 35'; Erdinç 56'; Jallet 84'	Stadium: Stade Nungesser; Attendance: 12,927; Referee: Philippe Kalt

30 August 2009 4	Paris Saint-Germain	3–0	Lille	Paris
17:00	Clément 28'; Luyindula 77'; Jallet 90+1'			Stadium: Parc des Princes; Attendance: 34,439; Referee: Olivier Thual

13 September 2009 5	Monaco	2–0	Paris Saint-Germain	Fontvieille
21:00	Park 85'; Nenê 88'			Stadium: Stade Louis II; Attendance: 10,459; Referee: Laurent Duhamel

20 September 2009 6	Paris Saint-Germain	1–1	Lyon	Paris
21:00	Giuly 29'		Gomis 85'	Stadium: Parc des Princes; Attendance: 44,778; Referee: Fredy Fautrel

26 September 2009 7	Lorient	1–1	Paris Saint-Germain	Lorient
19:00	Mvuemba 40'		Hoarau 45+1'	Stadium: Stade du Moustoir; Attendance: 11,192; Referee: Saïd Ennjimi

3 October 2009 8	Paris Saint-Germain	1–1	Nancy	Paris
19:00	Sessègnon 18'		Hadji 13'	Stadium: Parc des Princes; Attendance: 36,779; Referee: Stéphane Lannoy

17 October 2009 9	Toulouse	1–0	Paris Saint-Germain	Toulouse
21:00	Ebondo 74'			Stadium: Stadium de Toulouse; Attendance: 23,754; Referee: Stéphane Bré

1 November 2009 12	Sochaux	1–4	Paris Saint-Germain	Montbéliard
21:00	Dalmat 86'		Clément 35'; Chantome 56'; Erdinç 75'; Luyindula 87'	Stadium: Stade Auguste-Bonal; Attendance: 16,405; Referee: Philippe Kalt

7 November 2009 13	Paris Saint-Germain	0–1	Nice	Paris
19:00			Rémy 88'	Stadium: Parc des Princes; Attendance: 36,300; Referee: Antony Gautier

20 November 2009 10	Marseille	1–0	Paris Saint-Germain	Marseille
21:00	Heinze 25'			Stadium: Stade Vélodrome; Attendance: 55,623; Referee: Laurent Duhamel

28 November 2009 15	Paris Saint-Germain	1–0	Auxerre	Paris
19:00	Clément 66'			Stadium: Parc des Princes; Attendance: 34,849; Referee: Saïd Ennjimi

2 December 2009 14	Boulogne	2–5	Paris SG	Boulogne-sur-Mer
19:00	Ducatel 36'; Johann Ramaré 82' (pen.)		Chantôme 61'; Peguy Luyindula 64' (pen.); Erdinç 67', 70'; Maurice 86'	Stadium: Stade de la Libération; Attendance: 12,346; Referee: Stéphane Bré

5 December 2009 16	Bordeaux	1–0	Paris Saint-Germain	Bordeaux
21:00	Plašil 24'			Stadium: Stade Chaban-Delmas; Attendance: 32,826; Referee: Damien Ledentu

13 December 2009 17	Paris Saint-Germain	3–0	Saint-Étienne	Paris
17:00	Luyindula 11'; Sessègnon 13'; Erdinç 39'			Stadium: Parc des Princes; Attendance: 38,462; Referee: Olivier Thual

16 December 2009 11	Paris Saint-Germain	1–1	Lens	Paris
21:00	Makélélé 70'		Maoulida 74'	Stadium: Parc des Princes; Attendance: 36,527; Referee: Pascal Vileo

19 December 2009 18	Rennes	1–0	Paris Saint-Germain	Rennes
19:00	Bangoura 40'			Stadium: Stade de la Route de Lorient; Attendance: 26,621; Referee: Wilfried Bien

23 December 2009 19	Paris Saint-Germain	4–0	Grenoble	Paris
19:00	Luyindula 9'; Armand 18'; Erdinç 65'; Jallet 80'			Stadium: Parc des Princes; Attendance: 32,548; Referee: Stéphane Lannoy

16 January 2010 20	Lille	3–1	Paris Saint-Germain	Villeneuve-d'Ascq
21:00	Obraniak 5'; Balmont 52'; Béria 68'		Erdinç 83'	Stadium: Stadium Lille Métropole; Attendance: 15,340; Referee: Saïd Ennjimi

20 January 2010 21	Paris Saint-Germain	0–1	Monaco	Paris
19:00			Edel 68' (o.g.)	Stadium: Parc des Princes; Attendance: 32,603; Referee: Ruddy Buquet

31 January 2010 22	Lyon	2–1	Paris Saint-Germain	Lyon
21:00	Gomis 77'; Cris 81'		Erdinç 10'	Stadium: Stade de Gerland; Attendance: 35,157; Referee: Philippe Kalt

6 February 2010 23	Paris Saint-Germain	0–3	Lorient	Paris
19:00			Vahirua 24' (pen.); Gameiro 26'; Amalfitano 36'	Stadium: Parc des Princes; Attendance: 32,156; Referee: Philippe Malige

13 February 2010 24	Nancy	0–0	Paris Saint-Germain	Tomblaine
19:00				Stadium: Stade Marcel Picot; Attendance: 15,650; Referee: Olivier Thual

20 February 2010 25	Paris Saint-Germain	1–0	Toulouse	Paris
21:00	Hoarau 24' (pen.)			Stadium: Parc des Princes; Attendance: 32,544; Referee: Stéphane Lannoy

28 February 2010 26	Paris Saint-Germain	0–3	Marseille	Paris
21:00			Ben Arfa 15'; Lucho González 54'; Cheyrou 71'	Stadium: Parc des Princes; Attendance: 43,813; Referee: Antony Gautier

6 March 2010 27	Lens	1–1	Paris Saint-Germain	Lens
19:00	Roudet 68'		Sessègnon 90+4'	Stadium: Stade Félix-Bollaert; Attendance: 35,157; Referee: Ruddy Buquet

13 March 2010 28	Paris Saint-Germain	4–1	Sochaux	Paris
19:00	Hoarau 17'; Erdinç 18', 35', 70'		Boudebouz 64' (pen.)	Stadium: Parc des Princes; Attendance: 29,249; Referee: Alexandre Castro

20 March 2010 29	Nice	1–0	Paris Saint-Germain	Nice
19:00	Rémy 79'			Stadium: Stade du Ray; Attendance: 0 Referee: Stéphane Bré

28 March 2010 30	Paris Saint-Germain	3–0	Boulogne	Paris
17:00	Lecointe 27' (o.g.); Hoarau 35' (pen.); Kežman 80'			Stadium: Parc des Princes; Attendance: 0 Referee: Saïd Ennjimi

4 April 2010 31	Auxerre	1–1	Paris Saint-Germain	Auxerre
21:00	Niculae 11'		Sankharé 16'	Stadium: Stade de l'Abbé-Deschamps; Attendance: 16,153; Referee: Philippe Kalt

10 April 2010 32	Paris Saint-Germain	3–1	Bordeaux	Paris
21:00	Armand 35'; Erdinç 74'; Hoarau 86'		Sané 80'	Stadium: Parc des Princes; Attendance: 42,127; Referee: Alexandre Castro

18 April 2010 33	Saint-Étienne	0–0	Paris Saint-Germain	Saint-Étienne
21:00				Stadium: Stade Geoffroy-Guichard; Attendance: 26,493; Referee: Philippe Malige

14 April 2010 34	Paris Saint-Germain	1–1	Rennes	Paris
21:00	Hoarau 64'		Leroy 32'	Stadium: Parc des Princes; Attendance: 32,596; Referee: Damien Ledentu

27 April 2010 35	Grenoble	4–0	Paris Saint-Germain	Grenoble
19:00	Batlles 26'; Dieuze 44'; Akrour 65'; Ljuboja 68'			Stadium: Stade des Alpes; Attendance: 12,386; Referee: Stéphane Lannoy

5 May 2010 36	Paris Saint-Germain	2–2	Valenciennes	Paris
19:00	Erdinç 30'; Kežman 90'		Bong 59'; Ben Khalfallah 90+3'	Stadium: Parc des Princes; Attendance: 29,873; Referee: Didier Falcone

8 May 2010 37	Le Mans	1–0	Paris Saint-Germain	Le Mans
21:00	Armand 9'			Stadium: Stade Léon-Bollée; Attendance: 8,582; Referee: Laurent Duhamel

15 May 2010 38	Paris Saint-Germain	1–3	Montpellier	Paris
21:00	Erdinç 79'		Dernis 16', 58'; Compan 47'	Stadium: Parc des Princes; Attendance: 32,124; Referee: Alexandre Castro

=== Coupe de France ===
Paris Saint-Germain entered the French Cup at the round of 64, as all Ligue 1 clubs did. Paris was pitted against fifth tier club Aubervilliers. Despite strong local support for CFA 2 side Aubervilliers, the Parisian French Cup derby was a one-sided affair, Paris running riot at the Parc des Princes. Despite many of the weekend's French Cup matches being postponed due to the cold snap in France, the draw for the round of 32 was held and Paris Saint-Germain hosted National side Évian at the Parc des Princes. Paris Saint-Germain qualified for the last-16 of the French Cup with a win over courageous Évian at the Parc des Princes. Mevlüt Erdinç scored twice with Guillaume Hoarau netting the third. The draw for the round of 16 of the French Cup was effected and PSG was pitted away to fourth tier club Vesoul. Paris Saint-Germain put their current league troubles behind them, continuing their winning ways in the French Cup with a narrow win in a heated affair away to CFA side Vesoul to advance to the quarter-finals. The quarter-finals of the French Cup were drawn, with the pick of the bunch being Auxerre's playing host to Paris Saint-Germain. Paris Saint-Germain pulled off a dramatic win, 6–5 on penalties over Auxerre after extra time ended scoreless to book a place in the semi-finals. CFA amateurs Quevilly got their reward for knocking out Boulogne as they were drawn at home to Paris Saint-Germain, who eliminated Auxerre. Paris Saint-Germain booked their place in the French Cup final against AS Monaco in the final after ending amateur side Quevilly's stunning campaign with a narrow victory in Caen, top scorer Mevlüt Erdinç scoring the only goal of a lively cup encounter. Guillaume Hoarau's extra-time strike was enough to claim PSG's eighth French Cup title in a hard-fought final against Monaco, whose coach Guy Lacombe failed at the final French Cup hurdle for the second year running, at the Stade de France.

==== Matches ====
10 January 2010 Round of 64	Paris Saint-Germain	5–0	Aubervilliers	Paris
20:45	Luyindula 10', 38'; Erding 23'; Chantôme 65'; Maurice 81' (pen.)		Marlet (yellow card) 14'; Lamamiri (yellow card) 33'	Stadium: Parc des Princes; Attendance: 13,395; Referee: Hervé Piccirillo

24 January 2010 Round of 32	Paris Saint-Germain	3–1	Évian	Paris
17:45	Erding 15', 60'; Hoarau (yellow card) 85' Hoarau 90+4'		Ponroy (yellow card) 43'; Rambier (yellow card) 54'; Bérigaud 66'; Amalfitano (yellow card) 67'	Stadium: Parc des Princes; Attendance: 15,000; Referee: Bertrand Layec

9 February 2010 Round of 16	Vesoul	0–1	Paris Saint-Germain	Vesoul
20:45	Paul (red card) 71'		Giuly 15'; (yellow card) 66' Sakho; Sessègnon (red card) 71'; Sankharé (yellow card) 85'; Ngoyi (yellow card) 90+1'	Stadium: Stade René Hologne; Attendance: 6,135; Referee: Damien Ledentu

23 March 2010 Quarter-finals	Auxerre	0–0 (a.e.t.) (5–6 p)	Paris Saint-Germain	Auxerre
20:45	Hengbart (yellow card) 96'		Clément (yellow card) 53'; Sessègnon (yellow card) 55'; Chantôme (yellow card) 110'	Stadium: Stade de l'Abbé-Deschamps; Attendance: 0 Referee: Pascal Viléo
	Penalties
	Hengbart (penalty scored); Pedretti (penalty scored); Mignot (penalty scored); Ndinga (penalty scored); Dudka (penalty scored); Quercia (penalty missed)		(penalty scored) Hoarau; (penalty scored) Jallet; (penalty scored) Chantôme; (penalty scored) Kežman; (penalty scored) Giuly; (penalty scored) Makélélé

14 April 2010 Semi-finals	Quevilly	0–1	Paris Saint-Germain	Caen
20:45	Pallois (yellow card) 43'; Weis (yellow card) 45'; Colinet (yellow card) 59'; Traoré (yellow card) 84'; Passape (yellow card) 90+2'		Erdinç (yellow card) 15', (goal) 51'; Edel (yellow card) 43'; Makelele (yellow card) 45'; Kežman (yellow card) 83'; Camara (yellow card) 90'	Stadium: Stade Michel d'Ornano; Attendance: 20,523; Referee: Fredy Fautrel

1 May 2010 Final	Monaco	0–1 (a.e.t.)	Paris Saint-Germain	Paris
20:45	Alonso (yellow card) 22'; Nenê (yellow card) 63'; Mongongu (yellow card) 105'; Costa (yellow card) 110'		Makelele (yellow card) 59'; Hoarau 105', (yellow card) 110'	Stadium: Stade de France; Attendance: 75,000; Referee: Lionel Jaffredo

=== Coupe de la Ligue ===
The League Cup draw for the third round was held and threw up no less than six all-Ligue 1 ties, including Paris Saint-Germain's trip to Boulogne. Jean-Eudes Maurice scored the goal that separated the two Ligue 1 sides on the hour. Boulogne had several chances but could not beat veteran goalkeeper Grégory Coupet. Midfielder Clément Chantôme hit the post for PSG late on. PSG travelled to French Cup holders Guingamp for the last-16. PSG quit the League Cup after they lost their last-16 clash away to Guingamp. The Brittany outfit won courtesy of a Mamadou Sakho own goal.

==== Matches ====
23 September 2009 Round of 32	Boulogne	0–1	Paris Saint-Germain	Boulogne-sur-Mer
20:45	Ducatel (yellow card) 77'		Maurice 60'; Ngoyi (yellow card) 66'	Stadium: Stade de la Libération; Attendance: 5,809; Referee: Bertrand Layec

13 January 2010 Round of 16	Guingamp	1–0	Paris Saint-Germain	Guingamp
17:00	Sakho 76' (o.g.); Diallo (red card) 76'		Ngoyi (yellow card) 13'; Camara (yellow card) 22'	Stadium: Stade de Roudourou; Attendance: 5,898; Referee: Tony Chapron

== Start formations ==
Qnt	Formation	Match(es)
39	4-4-2	L1 (31), CL (2), CF (6)
6	4-2-3-1	L1 (6)
1	4-3-2-1	L1 (1)

Source: PSG.fr
Only competitive matches.

Starting XI

No.	Pos.	Nat.	Name	MS	Notes
30	GK	(Armenia)	Apoula Edel	29	
26	RB	(France)	Christophe Jallet	31	
15	CB	(France)	Zoumana Camara	29	
3	CB	(France)	Mamadou Sakho	39	
22	LB	(France)	Sylvain Armand	38	
7	RW	(France)	Ludovic Giuly	31	
4	DM	(France)	Claude Makélélé	36	
23	DM	(France)	Jérémy Clément	40	
10	AM	(Benin)	Stéphane Sessègnon	31	
8	FW	(France)	Péguy Luyindula	25	
11	FW	(Turkey)	Mevlüt Erdinç	36	

Source: Squad stats and Start formations.
Only competitive matches.
Using the most used start formation.
Ordered by position on pitch (from back right to front left).

== Appearances and goals ==
No.	Pos	Nat	Player	Total		Ligue 1		Coupe de la Ligue		Coupe de France	
No.	Pos	Nat	Player	Apps	Goals	Apps	Goals	Apps	Goals	Apps	Goals
1	GK	(France) FRA	Grégory Coupet	17	0	16	0	1	0	0	0
16	GK	(France) FRA	Willy Grondin	1	0	0	0	0	0	1	0
30	GK	(Armenia) ARM	Apoula Edel	30	0	23	0	1	0	6	0
2	DF	(Brazil) BRA	Ceará	35	0	29	0	2	0	4	0
3	DF	(France) FRA	Mamadou Sakho	39	0	32	0	2	0	5	0
13	DF	(Mali) MLI	Sammy Traoré	26	0	23	0	1	0	2	0
15	DF	(France) FRA	Zoumana Camara	30	0	23	0	1	0	6	0
22	DF	(France) FRA	Sylvain Armand	38	2	33	2	0	0	5	0
26	MF	(France) FRA	Christophe Jallet	43	3	35	3	2	0	6	0
4	MF	(France) FRA	Claude Makélélé	36	1	31	1	0	0	5	0
10	MF	(Benin) BEN	Stéphane Sessègnon	33	3	29	3	0	0	4	0
17	MF	(France) FRA	Granddi Ngoyi	20	0	16	0	2	0	2	0
20	MF	(France) FRA	Clément Chantôme	30	3	24	2	2	0	4	1
23	MF	(France) FRA	Jérémy Clément	41	3	34	3	1	0	6	0
24	MF	(France) FRA	Tripy Makonda	2	0	1	0	1	0	0	0
27	MF	(France) FRA	Younousse Sankharé	26	1	22	1	2	0	2	0
7	FW	(France) FRA	Ludovic Giuly	38	4	31	3	1	0	6	1
8	FW	(France) FRA	Péguy Luyindula	31	8	28	6	1	0	2	2
9	FW	(France) FRA	Guillaume Hoarau	28	8	22	6	1	0	5	2
11	FW	(Turkey) TUR	Mevlüt Erdinç	37	19	31	15	0	0	6	4
14	FW	(Serbia) SRB	Mateja Kežman	15	2	13	2	0	0	2	0
21	FW	(Haiti) HAI	Jean-Eudes Maurice	28	3	23	1	2	1	3	1

== Other statistics ==
No.	Pos.	Nat.	Player	Assists	Minutes Played	Yellow card	Red card
1	GK	(France)	Grégory Coupet	0	1523	0	0
16	GK	(France)	Willy Grondin	0	29	0	0
30	GK	(Armenia)	Apoula Edel	0	2588	1	0
2	DF	(Brazil)	Ceará	2	2760	1	0
3	DF	(France)	Mamadou Sakho	1	3456	7	1
6	DF	(France)	Grégory Bourillon	0	328	1	0
13	DF	(Mali)	Sammy Traoré	0	2072	4	0
15	DF	(France)	Zoumana Camara	0	2617	5	0
22	DF	(France)	Sylvain Armand	1	3416	4	0
26	DF	(France)	Christophe Jallet	8	3014	2	0
4	MF	(France)	Claude Makélélé	2	3136	9	0
10	MF	(Benin)	Stéphane Sessègnon	5	2692	4	2
12	MF	(Cameroon)	Albert Baning	0	10	0	0
17	MF	(France)	Granddi Ngoyi	0	1070	4	0
20	MF	(France)	Clément Chantôme	1	1310	4	0
23	MF	(France)	Jérémy Clément	1	3491	8	0
24	MF	(France)	Tripy Makonda	0	180	0	0
25	MF	(France)	Jérôme Rothen	0	0	0	0
27	MF	(France)	Younousse Sankharé	3	971	4	0
7	FW	(France)	Ludovic Giuly	3	2474	1	0
8	FW	(France)	Péguy Luyindula	2	2287	1	0
9	FW	(France)	Guillaume Hoarau	2	2067	5	0
11	FW	(Turkey)	Mevlüt Erdinç	2	2834	4	0
14	FW	(Serbia)	Mateja Kežman	1	420	4	0
18	FW	(France)	Loris Arnaud	0	8	0	0
21	FW	(Haiti)	Jean-Eudes Maurice	3	736	0	0

Only competitive matches
(yellow card) = Number of bookings; (second yellow card) = Number of sending offs after a second yellow card; (red card) = Number of sending offs by a direct red card.
