= 2009 Emirates Cup =

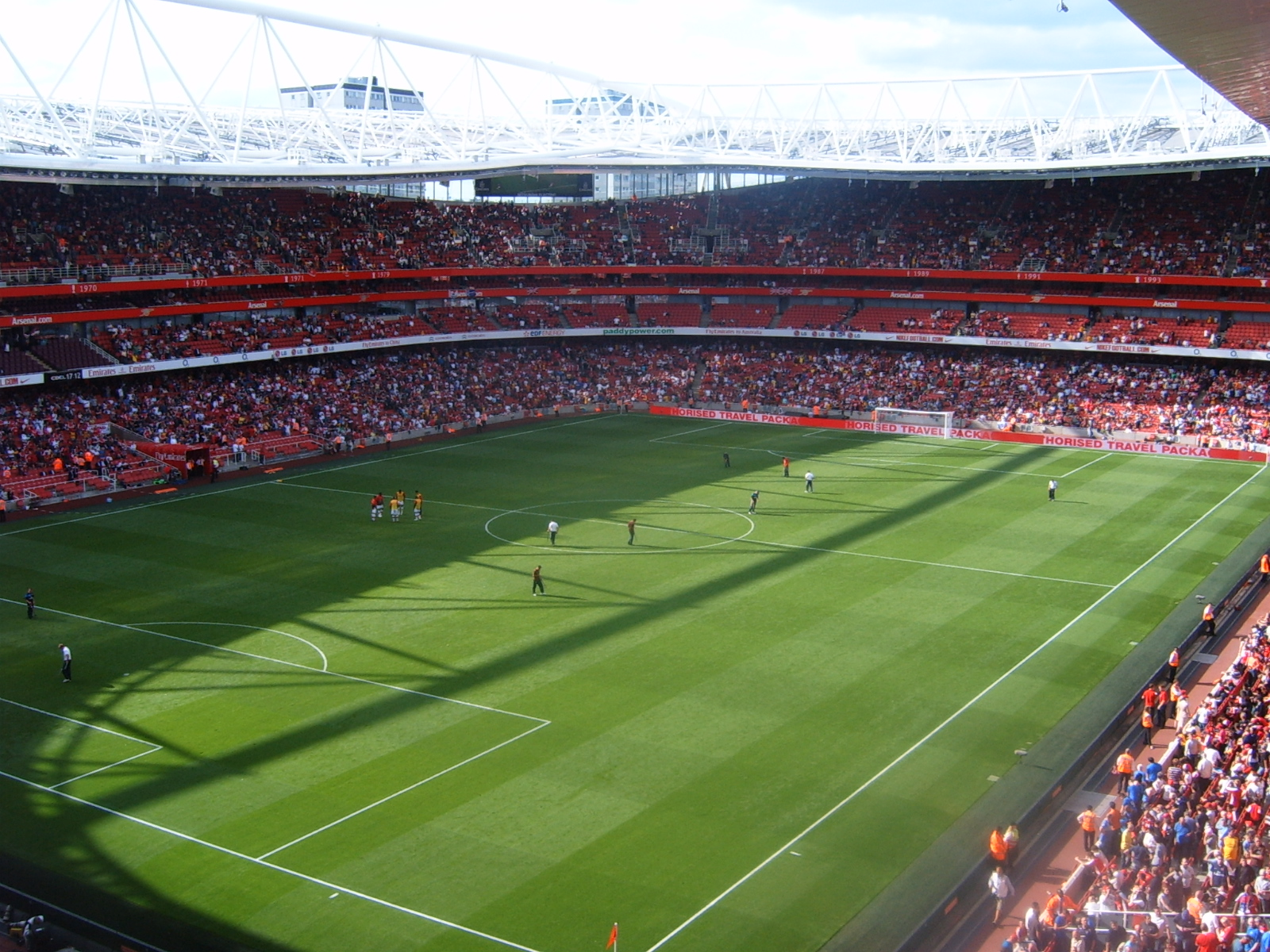

Tournament details
- Host country: England
- City: London
- Dates: 1–2 August
- Teams: 4 (from 1 confederation)
- Venue: 1 (in 1 host city)

Final positions
- Champions: Arsenal (2nd title)
- Runners-up: Rangers
- Third place: Atlético Madrid
- Fourth place: Paris Saint-Germain

Tournament statistics
- Matches played: 4
- Goals scored: 9 (2.25 per match)
- Top scorer(s): Andrey Arshavin; Jack Wilshere (2 goals)

The 2009 Emirates Cup was a pre-season football friendly tournament hosted by Arsenal at its home ground, the Emirates Stadium. It was the third Emirates Cup, an invitational competition inaugurated in 2007. Held on the weekend of 1–2 August 2009, the participants were Arsenal, Atlético Madrid, Rangers, and Paris Saint-Germain.

The competition follows a point scoring system much like the Amsterdam Tournament, whereby each team plays two matches, with three points awarded for a win, one point for a draw and none for a loss. An additional point is awarded for every goal scored. Arsenal did not face Paris Saint-Germain, and Rangers did not play against Atlético Madrid. On the first day of the tournament, Rangers beat Paris Saint-Germain by a single goal, while Arsenal defeated Atlético 2–1. On day two, Paris Saint-Germain and Atlético Madrid played out a draw and Arsenal convincingly won 3–0 against Rangers, regaining the competition's trophy in the process. Midfielder Jack Wilshere was voted man of the match in both of Arsenal's matches, while Andrey Arshavin received the Emirates Player of the Tournament award.

== Background ==
The Emirates Cup was inaugurated in July 2007 after Arsenal finalised plans to stage a pre-season competition at its home ground. The competition is named after Arsenal's main sponsor Emirates; the airline's association with the football club began in 2004. Arsenal won the first tournament, which was attended by over 110,000 people across the two days. The 2009 edition was televised live in the United Kingdom on Sky Sports.

== Summary ==
The opening match of the tournament saw Scottish champions Rangers taking on French side Paris Saint-Germain. Rangers manager Walter Smith set his team up in a 4–1–4–1 formation, with a four-man defence, Lee McCulloch in front of a four-man midfield and Kenny Miller playing as the lone striker. Paris Saint-Germain's first eleven included former Chelsea midfielder Claude Makélélé, who shielded their defence. Before kick-off, a minute's applause was held in tribute to former manager Sir Bobby Robson who died on 31 July. Neither Rangers or Paris Saint-Germain scored in the first half but the game was not incident free – Miller's attempt on goal in the early minutes was wide, and he nearly capitalised on goalkeeper Grégory Coupet leaving his goal line moments later as his cross almost looped into the net. Mevlüt Erdinç had Paris Saint-Germain's best chance after 30 minutes, but failed to connect to Jean-Eudes Maurice's cross. The winning goal, scored by Rangers, came after the interval; from a corner, defender Madjid Bougherra rose highest and headed the ball past Coupet.

Arsenal faced Atlético Madrid in the day's late kick-off. Midfielder Tomáš Rosický returned to the Arsenal team for the first time since January 2008 after a lengthy injury spell, while club captain Cesc Fàbregas was named on the substitutes' bench. The side lined up in a 4–3–3 formation, which Wenger introduced earlier in pre-season to get the best out of his attacking players. Atlético meanwhile started former Manchester United striker Diego Forlán up front, and former-Arsenal player José Antonio Reyes on the right-hand side of midfield. The visitors started well and almost made a perfect start when Reyes came close to scoring inside six minutes. Florent Sinama Pongolle and Forlán steered their headers wide, but despite the chances Atlético created, Arsenal dictated much of the play in the first 45 minutes. The introduction of academy graduate Jack Wilshere in the second half added fluency to Arsenal's game; reporter Amy Lawrence noted his touches of the ball received "unabashed excitement from the Emirates crowd." Arsenal scored with four minutes of normal time remaining when substitute Andrey Arshavin volleyed in from Fàbregas' cross. Germán Pacheco equalised for Atlético on the counter minutes later, but Arshavin in stoppage time scored again – this time profiting from defensive error, to give Arsenal a 2–1 win.

Atlético Madrid and Paris Saint-Germain played each other on the second day; both clubs made a number of changes to their team from their first game. Sergio Agüero, who started against Arsenal, gave Atlético the lead when he converted a penalty kick which was awarded after the forward was brought down by Albert Baning. Paris Saint-Germain played the remainder of the game with 10 men as Baning was sent off for his foul on Agüero. Despite the man disadvantage, they equalised in the second half as a well-worked move forced goalkeeper Roberto Jiménez Gago out of his position; Ludovic Giuly scored an open goal. The match ended 1–1, keeping Arsenal at the top of the table. The hosts later beat Rangers 3–0, with Wilshere scoring twice. Arsenal manager Arsène Wenger lauded his performance over the two days, telling reporters: "When he starts to go past people in the final 20 yards you can always say there is something special." Wilshere's performance was watched by England manager Fabio Capello, but Wenger restrained talk of his involvement in the national side: "Let’s be calm and quiet, the World Cup is next year. Let’s first see how he improves and plays; how consistent he is."

== Standings ==
Each team plays two matches, with three points awarded for a win, one point for a draw, and a point for every goal scored. For the first time in the competition total shots on target over two days are used as a tiebreaker, if teams are tied on points, goal difference and goals scored.

Pos	Team	Pld	W	D	L	GF	GA	GD	Pts
1	Arsenal	2	2	0	0	5	1	+4	11
2	Rangers	2	1	0	1	1	3	−2	4
3	Atlético Madrid	2	0	1	1	2	3	−1	3
4	Paris Saint-Germain	2	0	1	1	1	2	−1	2

== Matches ==
Day 1

1 August 2009
14:00 BST

Rangers	1–0	Paris Saint-Germain
Bougherra 76'	Report

Emirates Stadium, London
Attendance: 54,224
Referee: Alan Kelly

1 August 2009
16:15 BST

Arsenal	2–1	Atlético Madrid
Arshavin 86', 90'	Report	Pacheco 88'

Emirates Stadium, London
Attendance: 54,224
Referee: Mark Clattenburg

Day 2

2 August 2009
14:00 BST

Paris Saint-Germain	1–1	Atlético Madrid
Giuly 71'	Report	Agüero 41' (pen.)

Emirates Stadium, London
Attendance: 56,758
Referee: Alan Wiley

2 August 2009
16:15 BST

Arsenal	3–0	Rangers
Wilshere 2', 72'; Eduardo 11'	Report

Emirates Stadium, London
Attendance: 56,758
Referee: Mike Dean

== Goalscorers ==
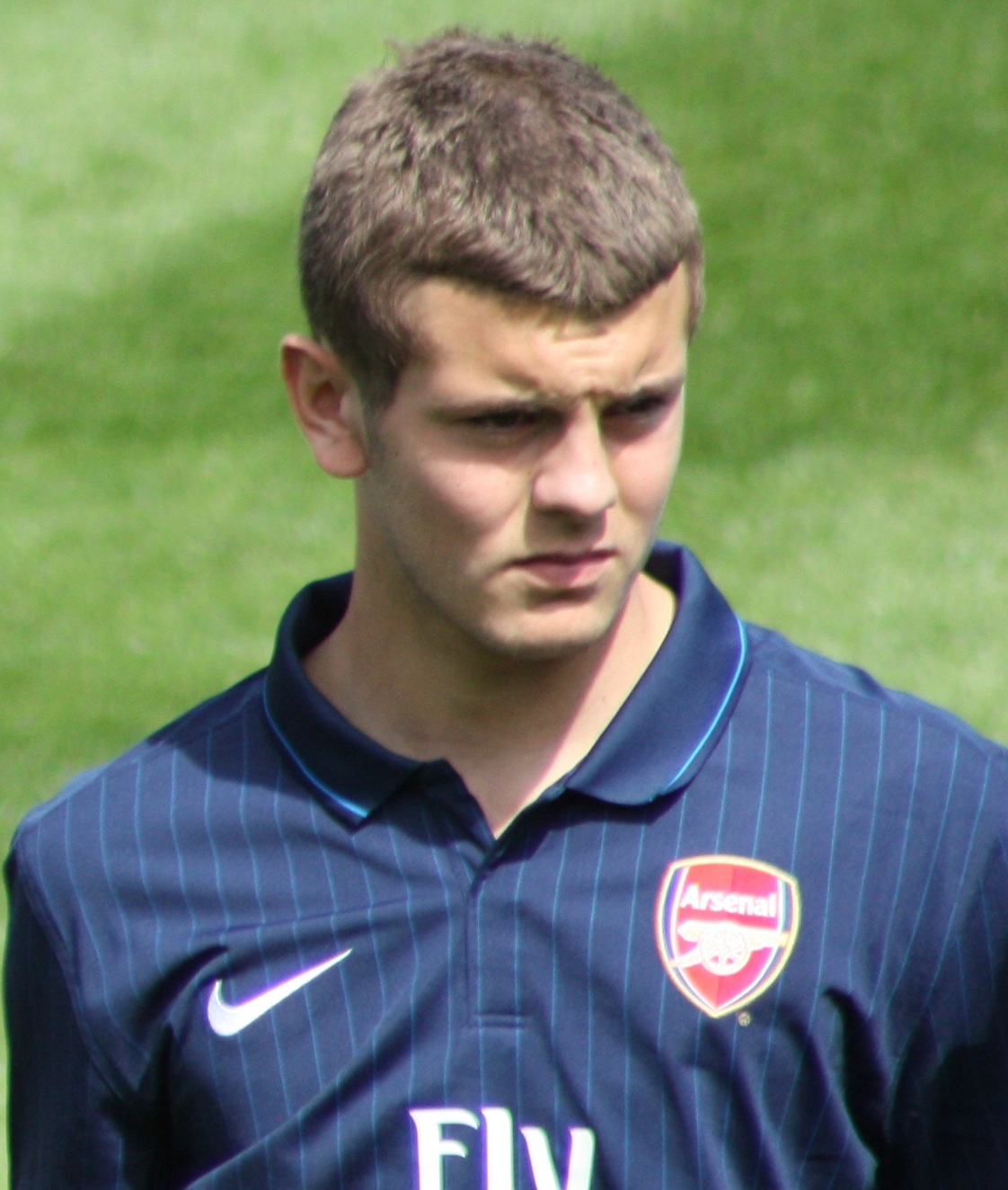
Jack Wilshere scored two goals in the tournament

Rank	Name	Team	Goals
1	(Russia) Andrey Arshavin	Arsenal	2
1	(England) Jack Wilshere	Arsenal	2
3	(Algeria) Madjid Bougherra	Rangers	1
3	(Argentina) Germán Pacheco	Atlético Madrid	1
3	(Argentina) Sergio Agüero	Atlético Madrid	1
3	(France) Ludovic Giuly	Paris Saint-Germain	1
3	(Croatia) Eduardo da Silva	Arsenal	1
