= Guillaume Hoarau =

French footballer (born 1984)

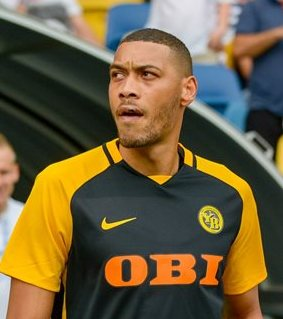
- Hoarau with Young Boys in 2017

Personal information
- Date of birth: 5 March 1984 (age 42)
- Place of birth: Saint-Louis, Réunion, France
- Height: 1.92 m (6 ft 4 in)
- Position: Forward

Youth career
- 1994–2004: Saint-Pierroise

Senior career*
Years	Team	Apps	(Gls)
2004–2008	Le Havre	81	(33)
2006–2007	→ Gueugnon (loan)	21	(8)
2008–2013	Paris Saint-Germain	114	(38)
2013	Dalian Aerbin	20	(3)
2014	Bordeaux	16	(3)
2014–2020	Young Boys	141	(94)
2020–2022	Sion	30	(9)
2022–2023	Saint-Pierroise		
2023–2024	FC Muri	6	(4)
Total		423	(188)

International career
2003	Réunion	3	(0)
2010–2011	France	5	(0)
- * Club domestic league appearances and goals

Guillaume Hoarau (born 5 March 1984) is a French former professional footballer who played as a forward.

== Club career ==
=== Early career ===
Hoarau started his football career at JS Saint-Pierroise in his native Réunion. In 1995, Le Havre AC scouts considered him too "thin" and signed his then-teammate Florent Sinama Pongolle. After gaining the attention of then-Le Havre manager Jean-François Domergue, Hoarau signed his first professional contract at the age of 20 for Le Havre in January 2004. He made his league debut on 12 May 2004 against Châteauroux in a 2–1 loss, coming on as a substitute.

Despite being signed, Hoarau spent the majority of his career under Domergue playing in the reserves, often earning brief call-ups to the senior squad, then quickly being sent down. He registered his first career goal in just the second match of the 2004–05 season in a 2–1 victory over Amiens. Despite this, his play was heavily limited following the firing of Domergue and the appointment of temporary manager Philippe Hinschberger. During the following season under new manager Thierry Uvenard, his playing time increased—he appeared in 28 matches, scoring five goals. The next season, he only made five appearances for Le Havre before being sent on loan to Gueugnon, where he made 21 appearances and scored eight goals.

=== Ligue 2 star ===
Under new manager Jean-Marc Nobilo, his fourth manager in four years, Hoarau was installed as the lead striker and flourished. Playing in all 38 league matches, he was top scorer with 28 goals and, at one point during the season, scored at least one goal in 12-straight matches. His performances led to the French media naming him the "Karim Benzema of Ligue 2", as Benzema was having a similar season in Ligue 1. His performances caught the eye of several Ligue 1 clubs, such as Auxerre, Marseille, and Paris Saint-Germain to name a few, as well as English clubs Arsenal, Blackburn Rovers and Chelsea, who likened the player to Peter Crouch. Eventually, it was announced in January 2008 that Hoarau had signed with Parisian club Paris Saint-Germain on a four-year deal after reportedly snubbing the club's primary rival, Marseille. PSG paid Le Havre fee of €500,000 and also allowed the player to finish the Ligue 2 season with his former club, whom he helped achieve promotion to Ligue 1.

=== Paris Saint-Germain ===
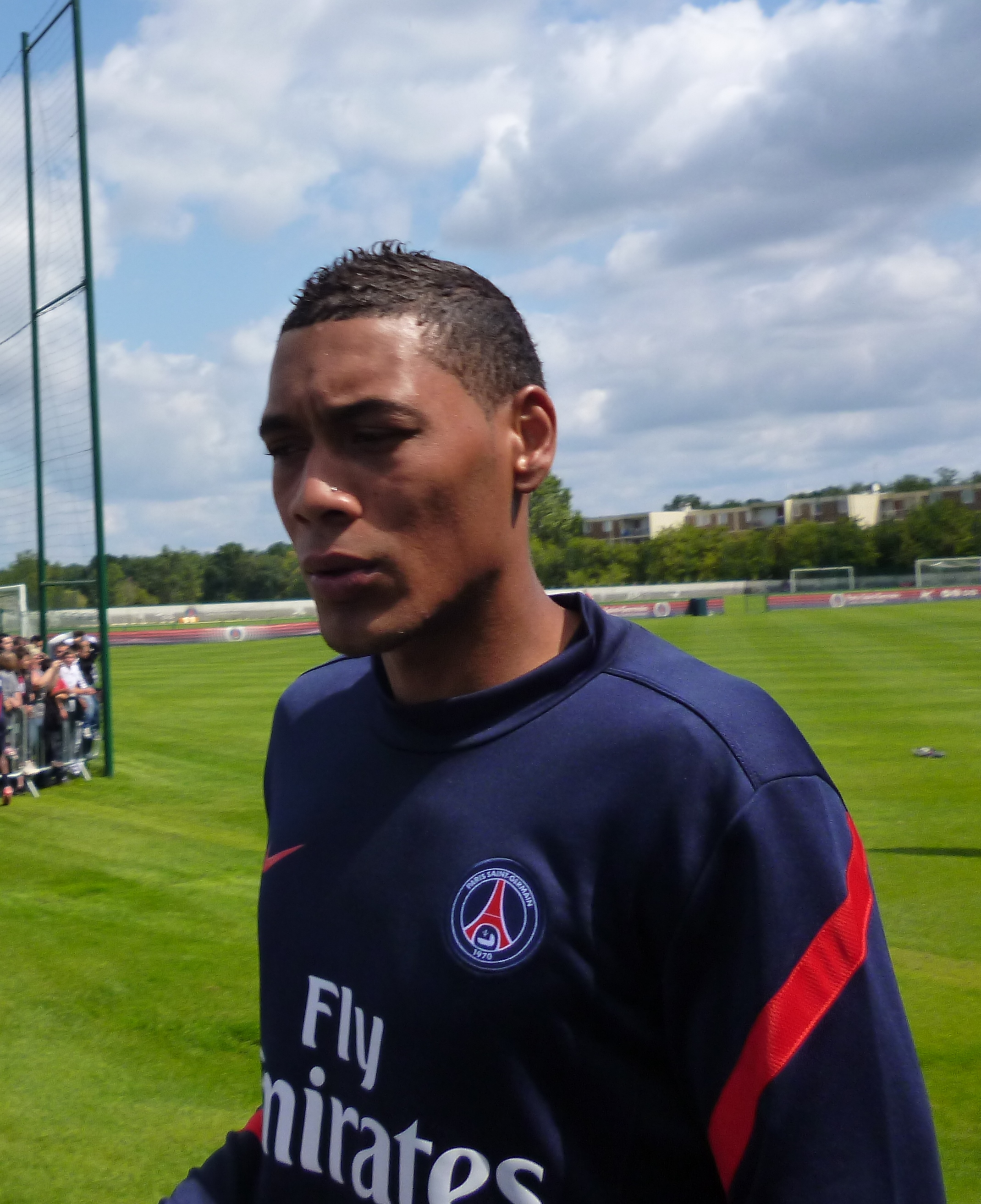
Hoarau during a training session with Paris Saint-Germain in 2011

Hoarau arrived in Paris following the Ligue 2 season with high expectations, as he was expected to replace club legend Pauleta and live up to comments made by former president Alain Cayzac, who referred to Hoarau as being the "signing of the century" for PSG.

He made his debut for the club in a 1–0 defeat at Monaco on 9 August 2008. After going scoreless the first week, Hoarau responded in the second week scoring his first goal for the club on his home debut in a 1–0 victory over Bordeaux. His breakthrough into the team came in the annual Classique against rivals Marseille on 26 October 2008. In a huge 4–2 victory for the club, Hoarau scored a brace. He followed this up by scoring another brace, this time against his former club Le Havre in a 3–1 victory. His next set of goals were against Le Mans, earning another brace in another 3–1 victory. Hoarau also continued his solid form on the European stage scoring a brace in the club's first leg match against VfL Wolfsburg on 18 February 2009 in the 2008–09 UEFA Cup. In total for the season, Hoarau made 45 appearances, 32 in league play, and scored 20 goals, 17 in league play, contributing to the club's successful season where they reached as high as the second position in the league and made it to the quarter-finals of the UEFA Cup.

Due to his great performances, Hoarau was linked to several clubs, most notably Lyon, who offered €10 million for the player's services. Both Hoarau and PSG, however, downplayed the offer and, two days later, Hoarau signed a contract extension until 2013.

Following his successful first season in Paris, Hoarau struggled to reproduce the same kind of form. The arrival of new striker Mevlüt Erdinç failed to ignite a successful partnership, with both players often injured and profligate in front of goal whenever they managed to play. Hoarau did however score the winning goal for PSG in extra time in the 2010 Coupe de France Final. Since the signing of new striker Kevin Gameiro in the summer of 2011, both Hoarau and Erdinç were relegated to the substitutes' bench, and the former suffered a serious injury on the very first day of the 2011–12 season. Hoarau was linked with a loan move to Saint-Étienne. On the last day of the 2011–12 season, with Montpellier and PSG both chasing the Ligue 1 title, Hoarau suffered an injury in a match against Lorient, with Montpeillier going on to win their first league title.

In the 2012–13 season, Hoarau featured less for the club and was placed on the transfer list despite being out of contract at the end of the season.

Upon his departure to Dalin Aerbin, Hoarau appeared at Parc des Princes, where he made a farewell speech and was left emotional, saying, "Nothing has changed. I'm a little excited. I have a small tear in the eye."

=== Dalian Aerbin ===
On 9 January 2013, Hoarau signed with Chinese Super League side Dalian Aerbin. On the same day, he was presented by the club. His move to China received objection by commentator Jean-Michel Larqué.

Hoarau made his debut in the opening game of the season, coming on as a substitute in the 69th minute for Zhou Tong, in a 1–0 loss against Shandong Luneng. Hoarau scored his first goal three weeks later, on 30 March 2013, in a 3–3 draw against newly promoted Shanghai East Asia. Two weeks later, on 14 April 2013, Hoarau scored again in a 2–1 loss against reigning league champion Guangzhou Evergrande. Hoarau later struggled to score despite having earned himself as first team regular. His lack of scoring lead the club recruit Nabil Baha as their new striker, with the club considering selling Hoarau during the summer transfer window. Eventually, Hoarau would stay at the club for the season and would help the club finish in fifth in the league table.

Upon the conclusion of the 2013 season, Chinese media Sina Sports reported that Hoarau was among several foreign players to leave Dalian Aerbin. Four days later, the club confirmed the departure of Hoarau, who would return to France.

=== Bordeaux ===
After one season in China, Hoarau returned to France by joining Ligue 1 side Bordeaux until the end of the 2013–14 season. Prior to the move, Hoarau was also linked with Marseille. The move to Marseille did not transpire, as Hoarau preferred moving elsewhere.

=== Young Boys ===
In the summer of 2014, Hoarau left Bordeaux and joined Swiss side BSC Young Boys.

He was part of the Young Boys squad that won the 2017–18 Swiss Super League, their first league title in 32 years.

In the play-off round of the Champions League campaign the following season, Hoarau scored goals in both legs against Dinamo Zagreb, which took Young Boys to the group stages for the first time ever. He scored twice more in the final group game on 12 December, a surprise 2–1 defeat of Italian giants Juventus. Despite the victory, Young Boys still finished bottom of the group on four points.

=== Sion ===
On 18 September 2020, Hoarau signed with fellow Swiss side Sion.

=== Retirement ===
In August 2022, at the age of 38, Hoarau announced his retirement from professional playing.

== International career ==
On 23 March 2009, Hoarau was called up to the France national team to replace the injured Nicolas Anelka on the squad.

== Personal life ==
In addition to football, Hoarau has a strong passion for making music and has sung live on French TV.

== Career statistics ==
=== Club ===
Appearances and goals by club, season and competition
Club	Season	League			National cup (Note: Includes Coupe de France, Chinese FA Cup, Swiss Cup)		League cup (Note: Includes Coupe de la Ligue)		Continental		Other		Total	
Club	Season	Division	Apps	Goals	Apps	Goals	Apps	Goals	Apps	Goals	Apps	Goals	Apps	Goals
Le Havre	2003–04	Ligue 2	1	0	0	0	0	0	—		—		1	0
Le Havre	2004–05	Ligue 2	9	1	0	0	1	0	—		—		10	1
Le Havre	2005–06	Ligue 2	28	4	1	0	1	0	—		—		30	4
Le Havre	2006–07	Ligue 2	5	0	0	0	1	1	—		—		6	1
Le Havre	2007–08	Ligue 2	38	28	1	0	2	1	—		—		41	29
Le Havre	Total		81	33	2	0	5	2	—		—		88	35
Gueugnon (loan)	2006–07	Ligue 2	21	8	1	0	0	0	—		—		22	8
Paris Saint-Germain	2008–09	Ligue 1	33	17	3	0	2	0	9 (Note: Appearances in UEFA Cup)	3	—		47	20
Paris Saint-Germain	2009–10	Ligue 1	22	6	5	2	1	0	—		—		28	8
Paris Saint-Germain	2010–11	Ligue 1	33	9	6	7	3	0	9 (Note: Appearances in UEFA Europa League)	4	0	0	51	20
Paris Saint-Germain	2011–12	Ligue 1	20	5	4	0	0	0	2	1	—		26	6
Paris Saint-Germain	2012–13	Ligue 1	6	1	0	0	1	0	2 (Note: Appearances in UEFA Champions League)	1	—		9	2
Paris Saint-Germain	Total		114	38	18	9	7	0	22	9	0	0	161	56
Dalian Yifang	2013	Chinese Super League	20	3	3	3	—		—		—		23	6
Bordeaux	2013–14	Ligue 1	16	3	0	0	1	0	—		—		17	3
Young Boys	2014–15	Swiss Super League	28	17	1	0	—		8	6	—		37	23
Young Boys	2015–16	Swiss Super League	22	18	0	0	—		3 (Note: One appearance in UEFA Champions League, two appearances in UEFA Europa League)	0	—		25	18
Young Boys	2016–17	Swiss Super League	21	18	2	2	—		7 (Note: Three appearances in UEFA Champions League, four appearances and five goals in UEFA Europa League)	5	—		30	25
Young Boys	2017–18	Swiss Super League	25	15	3	1	—		5 (Note: Three appearances in UEFA Champions League, four appearances and five goals in UEFA Europa League)	2	—		33	18
Young Boys	2018–19	Swiss Super League	28	24	2	0	—		7	5	—		37	29
Young Boys	2019–20	Swiss Super League	17	2	2	1	—		5	1	—		24	4
Young Boys	Total		141	94	10	4	—		35	19	—		186	117
Sion	2020–21	Swiss Super League	22	6	1	1	—		—		2 (Note: Appearances in Swiss Super League relegation play-offs)	2	25	9
Sion	2021–22	Swiss Super League	8	3	1	0	—		—		—		9	3
Sion	Total		30	9	2	1	—		—		2	2	34	12
Career total			423	188	36	17	13	2	57	28	2	2	531	237

== Honours ==
Le Havre

- Ligue 2: 2007–08

Paris Saint-Germain

- Ligue 1: 2012–13
- Coupe de France: 2009–10

Young Boys

- Swiss Super League: 2017–18, 2018–19, 2019–20
- Swiss Cup: 2019–20

Individual

- Ligue 2 Player of the Year: 2007–08
- Ligue 2 top scorer: 2007–08
- Ligue 2 Team of the Year: 2007–08
- Ligue 1 Team of the Year: 2008–09
- Swiss Super League Player of the Year: 2016
- Swiss Super League Team of the Year: 2016–17, 2018–19
- Swiss Super League top scorer: 2018–19
- Swiss Super League Goal of the Year: 2018–19
