= Willy Grondin =

French footballer (born 1974)

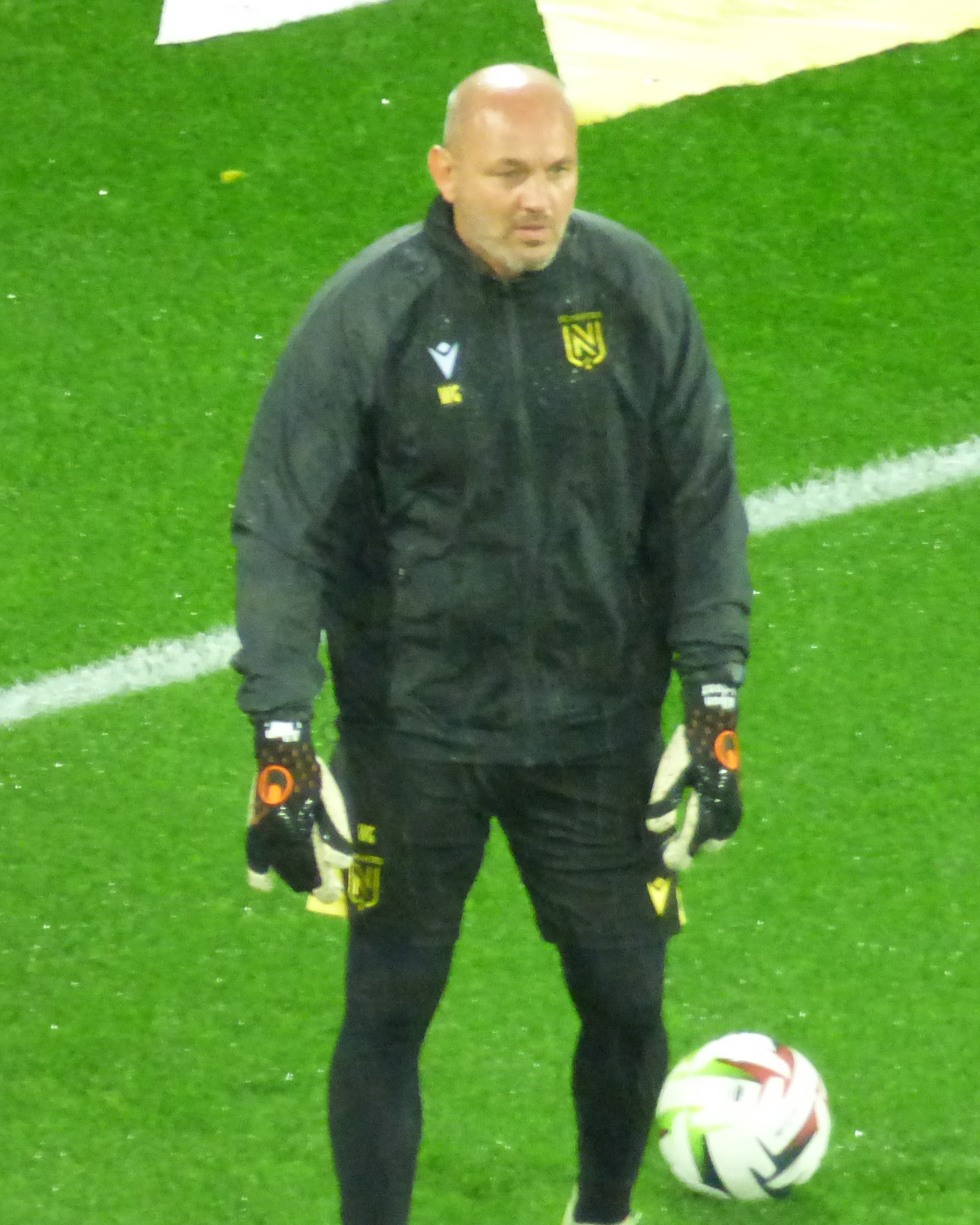
- Grondin in 2023

Personal information
- Date of birth: 12 October 1974 (age 52)
- Place of birth: Saint-Denis, Réunion, France
- Height: 1.76 m (5 ft 9 in)
- Position: Goalkeeper

Senior career*
Years	Team	Apps	(Gls)
1994–2004	Nantes	9	(0)
2004–2005	Le Mans	14	(0)
2005–2009	Valenciennes	11	(0)
2009–2010	Paris Saint-Germain	0	(0)
Total		34	(0)
- * Club domestic league appearances and goals

Willy Grondin (born 12 October 1974) is a French former professional footballer who played as a goalkeeper.

== Career ==
=== Nantes ===
Grondin's years with FC Nantes were his longest spent with any club. From 1998 to 2004 he helped his club stay in the French First Division while also winning two national cups in 1999 and 2000 and one championship in 2001. Internationally, he played his 2000–2002 seasons in Division 1, and also took part in the UEFA Champions League for FC Nantes.

=== Le Mans ===
Grondin was eventually loaned to the Le Mans UC72 and played for a full season with them, catching the attention of the Valenciennes FC, who purchased him the next year.

=== Valenciennes ===
Grondin played for Valenciennes FC and helped them to win the French Second Division, hence earning Valenciennes entrance to the French First Division, which they had been denied from for more than a decade. In the 2006–07 season, Grondin was moved to second choice goalkeeper, replaced by Nicolas Penneteau.

=== Paris Saint-Germain ===
After terminating his contract with Valenciennes on 9 July 2009, the goalkeeper signed a one-year deal with Paris Saint-Germain.

== Career statistics ==
Appearances and goals by club, season and competition
Club	Season	League			National cup		League cup		Europe		Other		Total	
Club	Season	Division	Apps	Goals	Apps	Goals	Apps	Goals	Apps	Goals	Apps	Goals	Apps	Goals
Nantes	1994–95	Division 1	0	0	0	0	0	0	0	0	—		0	0
Nantes	1995–96	Division 1	0	0	0	0	0	0	0	0	0	0	0	0
Nantes	1996–97	Division 1	0	0	0	0	0	0	0	0	—		0	0
Nantes	1997–98	Division 1	0	0	0	0	0	0	0	0	—		0	0
Nantes	1998–99	Division 1	0	0	0	0	0	0	—		—		0	0
Nantes	1999–2000	Division 1	1	0	0	0	0	0	0	0	0	0	1	0
Nantes	2000–01	Division 1	1	0	0	0	1	0	0	0	0	0	2	0
Nantes	2001–02	Division 1	1	0	1	0	1	0	1	0	0	0	4	0
Nantes	2002–03	Ligue 1	2	0	1	0	0	0	—		—		3	0
Nantes	2003–04	Ligue 1	4	0	0	0	1	0	2	0	—		7	0
Nantes	2004–05	Ligue 1	0	0	—		0	0	3	0	—		3	0
Nantes	Total		9	0	2	0	3	0	6	0	0	0	20	0
Le Mans	2004–05	Ligue 2	14	0	1	0	—		—		—		15	0
Valenciennes	2005–06	Ligue 2	2	0	1	0	1	0	—		—		4	0
Valenciennes	2006–07	Ligue 1	7	0	0	0	0	0	—		—		8	0
Valenciennes	2007–08	Ligue 1	1	0	0	0	0	0	—		—		1	0
Valenciennes	2008–09	Ligue 1	1	0	0	0	1	0	—		—		2	0
Valenciennes	Total		11	0	1	0	3	0	—		—		15	0
Paris Saint-Germain	2009–10	Ligue 1	0	0	1	0	0	0	—		—		1	0
Career total			34	0	5	0	6	0	6	0	0	0	51	0
