= Granddi Ngoyi =

Footballer (born 1988)

Granddi N'Goyi
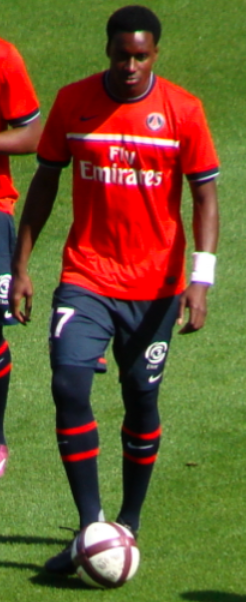
- N'Goyi with Paris Saint-Germain in 2011

Personal information
- Full name: Granddi N'Goyi Majundu
- Date of birth: 17 May 1988 (age 38)
- Place of birth: Melun, France
- Height: 1.86 m (6 ft 1 in)
- Position: Midfielder

Youth career
- 2006–2007: Paris Saint-Germain

Senior career*
Years	Team	Apps	(Gls)
2007–2012	Paris Saint-Germain	24	(0)
2009	→ Clermont (loan)	19	(1)
2010–2011	→ Brest (loan)	25	(0)
2011–2012	→ Nantes (loan)	20	(1)
2012–2013	Troyes	31	(1)
2013–2016	Palermo	25	(0)
2015	→ Leeds United (loan)	1	(0)
2015–2016	→ Dijon (loan)	13	(0)
2018	Sénart-Moissy	6	(1)
Total		164	(4)

International career
2007–2008	France U19	4	(0)
2008–2010	France U21	6	(0)
2011	DR Congo	1	(0)
- * Club domestic league appearances and goals

Granddi N'Goyi Majundu (born 17 May 1988) is a former professional footballer who played as a midfielder. He made one appearance for the DR Congo, having previously represented France internationally at youth level.

== Club career ==
=== Paris St. Germain and loans ===
N'Goyi was born to DR Congolese parents in Melun, a suburb of the French capital Paris. He began his career in the youth ranks of capital club Paris Saint-Germain. In 2007, he graduated to the first team of Paris Saint-Germain, where he made seven first team appearances in Ligue 1 for the club, with him mainly playing back up to Claude Makélélé and Jérémy Clément in the defensive midfielder positions.

On 7 January 2009, he went on loan to Ligue 2 side Clermont Foot. In total, he played 19 games and scored 1 goal for Clermont.

After impressing on loan, he returned to Paris Saint-Germain for the 2009–10 season, where he played more regularly, playing in 16 of Paris Saint-Germain Ligue 1 games and making a further four appearances in cup games, again N'Goyi was usually used as a back up to Makélélé and Clément.

He spent the 2010–11 season on loan at Brest playing 25 games.

After his former France U21 teammate Blaise Matuidi signed for Paris Saint-Germain, N'Goyi went on loan to Ligue 2 side Nantes for the 2011–12 season. He revealed after the signing of Matuidi that he joined Nantes as he wanted to be playing regular football at this stage of his career rather than being a backup player at Paris Saint-Germain. In total, he played 20 games scoring 1 goal for Nantes.

=== Troyes ===
On 28 June 2012, he signed a three-year contract with Troyes AC, newly promoted to Ligue 1, on a free transfer from Paris Saint-Germain. He was unable to keep Troyes AC in Ligue 1 with them finishing 19th during the 2012–13 season. In total, he played 31 games for Troyes scoring 1 goal.

=== Palermo ===
In the summer of 2013, after Troyes AC's relegation from Ligue 1, he moved on to then-Serie B Italian club Palermo on a four-year contract. On 11 August 2013, he made his Palermo debut playing in the Italian Cup match against Cremonese. On 24 August, he made his Serie B debut when started for Palermo against Modena in a 1–1 draw. In his first season at the club, he earned a promotion to Serie A after his club was promoted during the 2013–14 season, Palermo reached promotion with 5 games to spare, going up as Champions.

He made his first appearance in Serie A on 31 August 2014, making an appearance in a 1–1 draw against Sampdoria.

=== Leeds United ===
On 26 January 2015, N'Goyi joined Leeds United on loan until the end of the 2014–15 season, with the option for the club to complete a £2 million permanent deal. He was initially given the number 10 shirt. However, after the sale of Jason Pearce and the signing of Edgar Çani on 2 February, N'Goyi's squad number was then changed to number 6 with Football League approval. Çani subsequently took the number 10 shirt. After picking up an injury in one of his first training sessions at Leeds, N'Goyi's first involvement in the Leeds first team was on 6 April 2015 as an unused substitute against Wolverhampton Wanderers in a 4–3 defeat. On 14 April 2015, he made his debut for Leeds when he started against Norwich City in a 2–0 defeat.

== International career ==
=== Youth ===
Despite being of Congolese parents, N'Goyi represented the land of his birth, France at the UEFA European Under-19 Championship. He was handed the number 13 shirt for the tournament and played all four games the French took part in. He was one of the French penalty takers in the semi-final match against Spain, and scored his penalty, although the Spaniards went on to win 4–2.

In October 2008, N'Goyi was called up to represent DR Congo, along with Paris Saint-Germain teammates Larrys Mabiala and Youssouf Mulumbu, for the 2010 FIFA World Cup qualifier against rivals Malawi. He accepted the call-up but did not make his debut, as his team was surprisingly beaten 2–1 by Malawi, having taken an early 1–0 lead, through former Portsmouth and Newcastle United striker Lomana LuaLua.

On 3 August, he was called up to the France under-21 team for a friendly match against Poland. He made his debut in that match as a substitute. He was called up again, two weeks later, for their UEFA U-21 Championship qualifiers against Slovenia and Romania.

=== Senior ===
N'Goyi was called up and started for the DR Congo in a 3–0 friendly loss against Gambia.

On 13 November 2013, N'Goyi got another call-up to the DR Congo squad, but after discussions with manager Claude Le Roy to represent them, he and Stoke City midfielder Steven Nzonzi both turned down the opportunity to play for them.

N'Goyi remains eligible to still play for both DR Congo and France since he only played for DR Congo in a friendly match.

== Honours ==
Paris Saint-Germain

- Coupe de France: 2009–10

Palermo

- Serie B: 2013–14
