= Robin Leproux =

French businessman (born 1959)

- Born: 22 July 1959 (age 67); France
- Education: Reims Management School (1983)
- Occupation: Businessman
- Known for: President of Paris Saint-Germain (2009–2011)

Robin Leproux (born 22 July 1959) is a French businessman. He was the president of French football club Paris Saint-Germain from 2009 to 2011. Leproux was graduated from Reims Management School (Now NEOMA Business School) at 1983.

== Career ==
Prior to his work in football, Leproux worked for the music recording label PolyGram before moving on to the French television service M6, where he was later named vice-chairman. While at M6, Leproux was the director of football club Bordeaux. In 2001, Leproux was installed as president of RTL, the popular nationwide commercial radio network owned by the RTL Group. In 2006, he was recruited to head the French site of Axel Springer AG and was tasked with creating an English version of the German magazine Bild. In September 2009, Leproux was named president of football club Paris Saint-Germain. In his first year of presidency, the club won the Coupe de France. It was during Leproux's presidency that the "Plan Leproux" was instituted, banning 13,000 Paris Saint-Germain supporters in an effort to pacify the Parc des Princes.
