= 2010 Coupe de France final =

Final of the 2009–10 edition of the Coupe de France

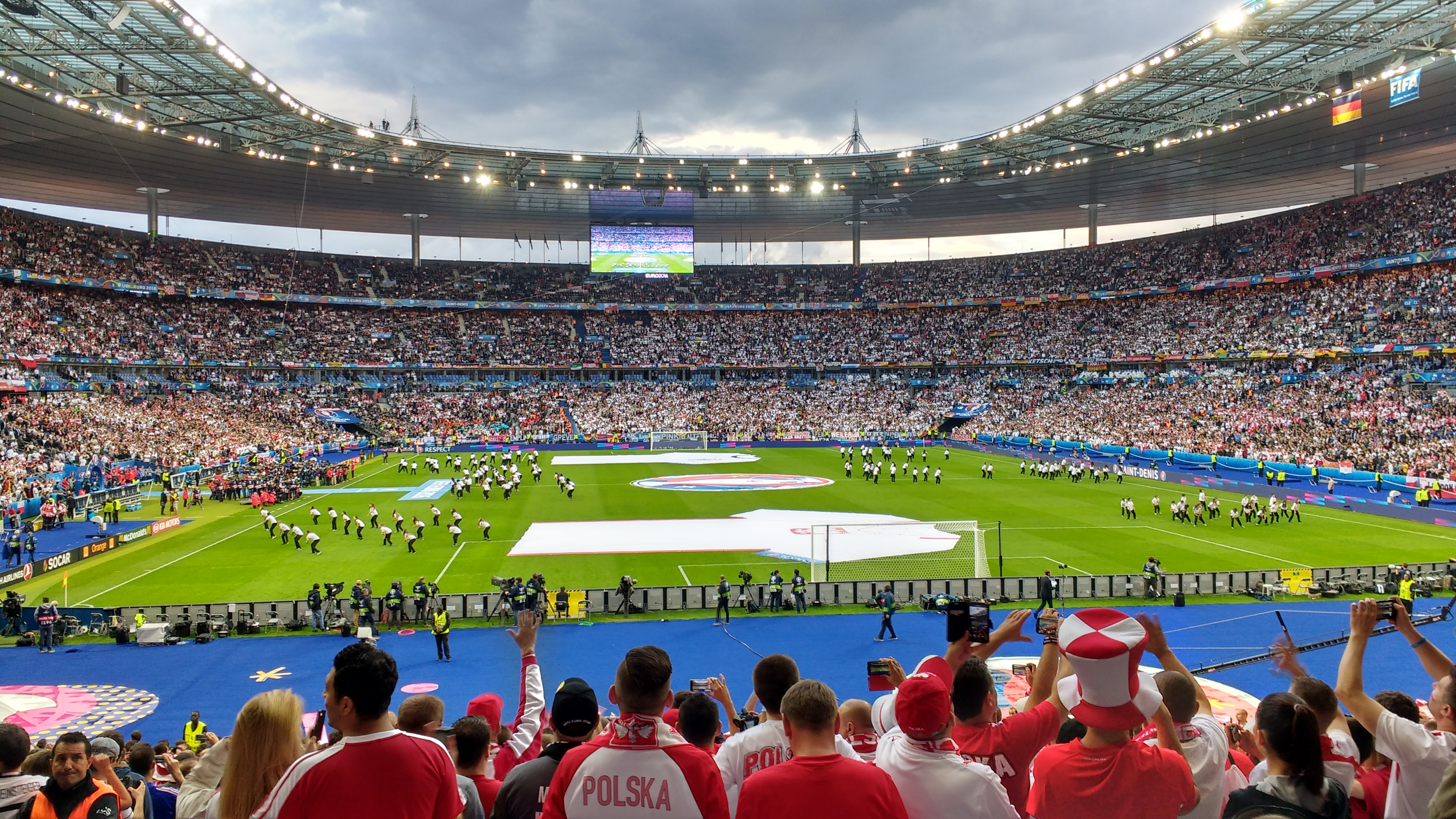
- Event: 2009–10 Coupe de France
Monaco	Paris Saint-Germain
Ligue 1	Ligue 1
0	1
- After extra time
- Date: 1 May 2010
- Venue: Stade de France, Saint-Denis
- Referee: Lionel Jaffredo (Brittany)
- Attendance: 75,000
- Weather: 14 °C (57 °F), Mostly Cloudy

The 2010 Coupe de France final was the 92nd final of France's most prestigious cup competition. The final took place on 1 May 2010 at the Stade de France in the Parisian suburb of Saint-Denis. The cup was won by Paris Saint-Germain with a 1–0 win against Monaco. A Guillaume Hoarau header in extra time was the difference between the teams.

As winners, PSG were guaranteed a UEFA Europa League place for the 2010–11 season, which they claimed after finishing 13th in Ligue 1, outside the Champions League qualification places. The final was televised on France 2, the cup's main broadcaster.

== Team background ==
Monaco's appearance in the Coupe de France final marked their eighth appearance in the competition's ultimate match. Of the appearances, Monaco have won the cup five times, which is tied for fourth in the cup's history. Monaco's last appearance in the final dates all the way back to the 1990–91 season when they defeated Marseille 1–0 with the lone goal coming from Gerald Passi.

Paris Saint-Germain entered the final for the 11th time in the club's history. Their 11 appearances rank second best behind Marseille in French football history. Of the 11 appearances, PSG has tasted cup victory seven times, second to Marseille's ten titles. Their last victory came during the 2005–06 season when they defeated Marseille 2–1 with the goals coming from Bonaventure Kalou and Vikash Dhorasoo. PSG's last finals appearance came during the 2007–08 season. The club suffered heartbreak losing 1–0 in extra time to Lyon.

In total, Monaco and PSG have contested each other 29 times in league play with the former having the advantage winning 16 matches. PSG have accounted for only three wins, while ten were played to a draw. Monaco and PSG have faced each other five times in the Coupe de France. One of their more important meetings in the competition came during the 1984–85 season when the two met in the competition's ultimate match. In the match – played at PSG's home stadium, the Parc des Princes – Monaco recorded a 1–0 victory with the only goal coming from French international Bernard Genghini. The club's most recent meetings came during the 2009–10 Ligue 1 season. The first match was played on 13 September 2009 at the Stade Louis II. The match ended in a 2–0 victory for Monaco, with Park Chu-young and Nenê scoring the goals. On 20 January 2010, the return match was played in Paris. The match ended 1–0 again, in favour of Monaco, with PSG goalkeeper Apoula Edel scoring an own goal for Monaco in the second half.

== Road to the final ==
Monaco			Round	Paris Saint-Germain
Opponent	H/A	Result	2009–10 Coupe de France	Opponent	H/A	Result
Tours	H	0–0 (a.e.t.) (4–3 pen.)	Round of 64	Aubervilliers	A	5–0
Lyon	H	2–1	Round of 32	Evian	H	3–1
Bordeaux	A	2–1	Round of 16	Vesoul	A	1–0
Sochaux	H	4–3 (a.e.t.)	Quarter-finals	Auxerre	A	0–0 (a.e.t.) (6–5 pen.)
Lens	H	1–0 (a.e.t.)	Semi-finals	Quevilly	A	1–0

== Match background ==
=== Ticketing ===
The Coupe de France final has been played every year at the Stade de France since 1998, following the stadium's completion. The stadium has a capacity of 81,338 spectators. Each club that will participate in the final will receive the same quota of tickets. The tickets were distributed to the public via each club, as well as the each club's league association. Paris Saint-Germain sold their tickets on 17 April at the service area of the Parc des Princes, the club's home stadium. Monaco distributed their tickets to the public four days later on 21 April at the Stade Louis II, the club's home stadium. The Ligue de la Méditerranée de Football, whom Monaco is representing, and the Ligue de Paris Ile-de-France de Football, whom Paris Saint-Germain is representing, only distributed tickets to local clubs within each league. Tickets went on sale to the general public on 26 April. Pricing was defined by category with Category 1 seats, the highest category, being priced at €115 and Category 3, the lowest, going for €55.

=== Officials ===
On 15 April, the French Football Federation announced that referee Lionel Jaffredo of Brittany would officiate the 2010 Coupe de France final. His assistants were Frédéric Cano of Centre-Ouest and Christophe Capelli of Aquitaine, with Clément Turpin of Bourgogne serving as the fourth official. Jaffredo refereed three league matches during the season that involved Monaco: a 1–0 defeat to Sochaux, a 1–1 draw with Le Mans and another stalemate with Auxerre. Jaffredo did not referee a match contested by Paris Saint-Germain this season.

== Match ==
=== Details ===
1 May 2010
20:45 CET

Monaco	0–1 (a.e.t.)	Paris Saint-Germain
	Report	Hoarau 105'

Stade de France, Saint-Denis
Attendance: 75,000
Referee: Lionel Jaffredo (Brittany)

AS Monaco	Paris Saint-Germain

GK	1	(France) Stéphane Ruffier
RB	4	(France) François Modesto
CB	2	(Democratic Republic of the Congo) Cédric Mongongu	(yellow card) 105'
CB	3	(France) Sébastien Puygrenier
LB	7	(Mali) Djimi Traoré
CM	6	(Brazil) Eduardo Costa	(yellow card) 110'	(substituted off) 111'
CM	5	(France) Thomas Mangani		(substituted off) 55'
AM	8	(Argentina) Alejandro Alonso (c)	(yellow card) 22'
RM	9	(Colombia) Juan Pablo Pino		(substituted off) 86'
LM	11	(Brazil) Nenê	(yellow card) 63'
CF	10	(South Korea) Park Chu-young
Substitutes:
GK	18	(France) Yohann Thuram-Ulien
DF	12	(Brazil) Adriano
DF	13	(France) Vincent Muratori
DF	16	(Cameroon) Nicolas N'Koulou		(substituted in) 111'
MF	15	(Nigeria) Lukman Haruna		(substituted in) 55'
FW	14	(Niger) Moussa Maâzou		(substituted in) 86'
FW	18	(France) Yannick Sagbo
Manager:
(France) Guy Lacombe

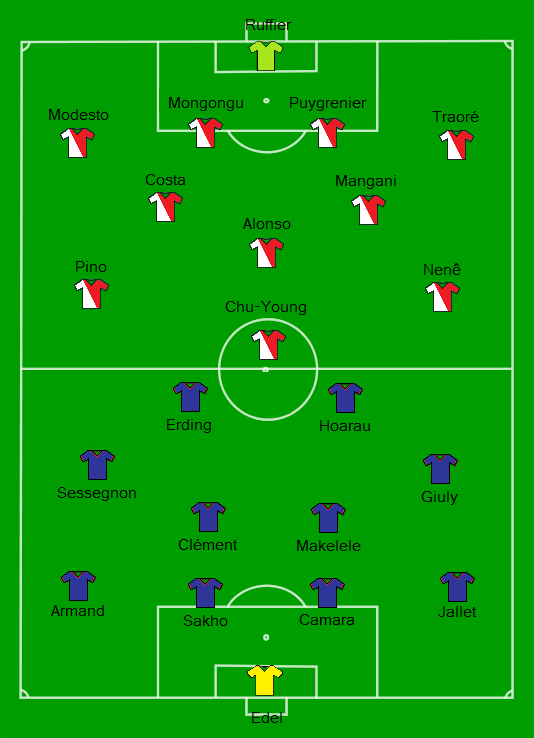

GK	1	(Armenia) Apoula Edel
RB	2	(France) Christophe Jallet		(substituted off) 116'
CB	3	(France) Mamadou Sakho
CB	6	(France) Zoumana Camara
LB	5	(France) Sylvain Armand
DM	4	(France) Claude Makélélé (c)	(yellow card) 59'
CM	8	(France) Jérémy Clément
RM	10	(Benin) Stéphane Sessègnon
LM	7	(France) Ludovic Giuly		(substituted off) 77'
CF	11	(Turkey) Mevlüt Erdinç		(substituted off) 105'
CF	9	(France) Guillaume Hoarau	(yellow card) 110'
Substitutes:
GK	18	(France) Grégory Coupet
DF	12	(Brazil) Ceará		(substituted in) 105'
DF	13	(Mali) Sammy Traoré		(substituted in) 116'
FW	14	(Serbia) Mateja Kežman
FW	15	(France) Jean-Eudes Maurice
FW	16	(France) Péguy Luyindula		(substituted in) 77'
MF	17	(France) Granddi Ngoyi
Manager:
(France) Antoine Kombouaré

Match officials

- Assistant referees:
  - Christophe Capelli (Aquitaine)
  - Frédéric Cano (Centre)
- Fourth official: Clément Turpin (Bourgogne)

Match rules

- 90 minutes.
- 30 minutes of extra-time if necessary.
- Penalty shoot-out if scores still level.
- Seven named substitutes.
- Maximum of three substitutions.
