= Sammy Traoré =

French and Malian footballer and manager (born 1976)

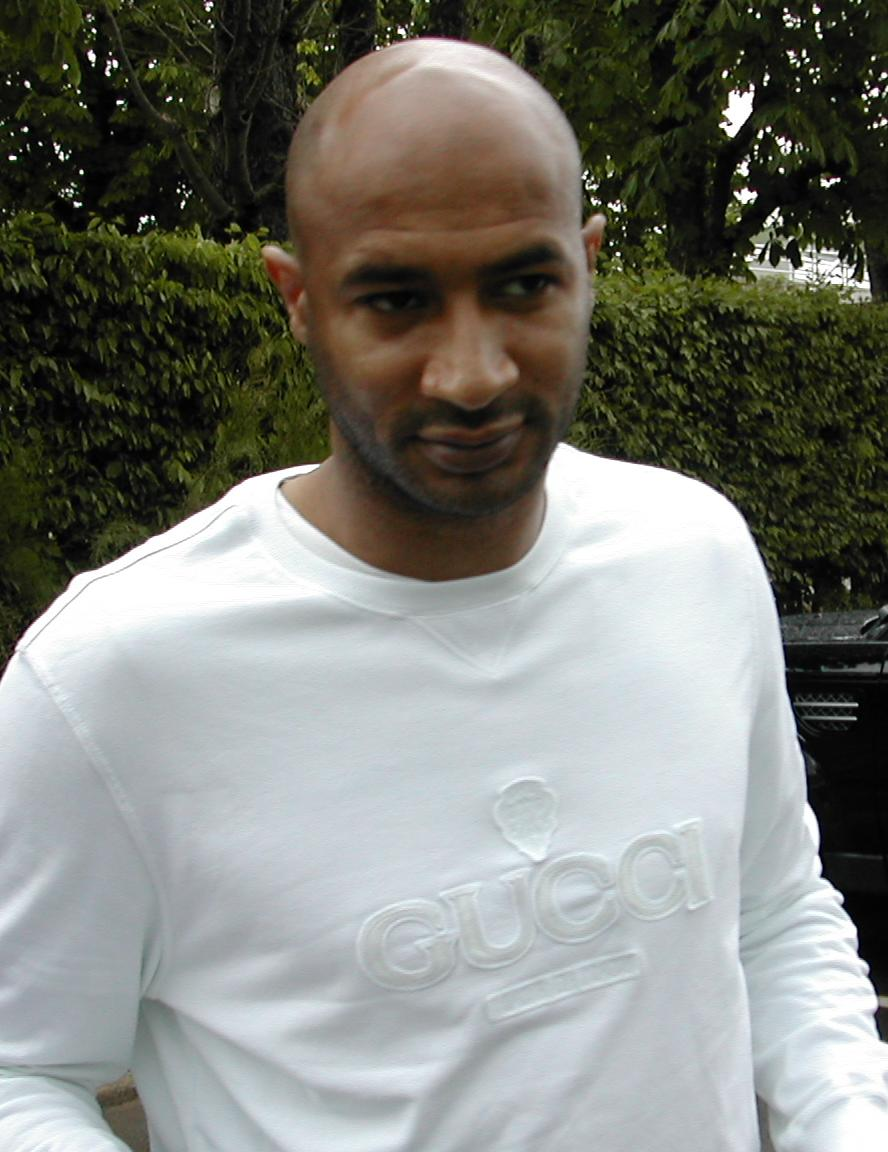
- Traoré with Paris Saint-Germain in May 2007

Personal information
- Date of birth: 25 February 1976 (age 50)
- Place of birth: Créteil, France
- Height: 1.94 m (6 ft 4 in)
- Position: Defender

Senior career*
Years	Team	Apps	(Gls)
1994–2002	Créteil-Lusitanos	149	(1)
2002–2006	Nice	112	(11)
2006–2011	Paris Saint-Germain	67	(1)
2007–2008	→ Auxerre (loan)	25	(1)
Total		353	(14)

International career
2001–2008	Mali	20	(1)

Managerial career
- 2016–: Maccabi Créteil FC
- * Club domestic league appearances and goals

Sammy Traoré (born 25 February 1976) is a French and Malian football manager, as a player his preferred position was a defender. He made good use of the stepover technique, rarely seen in defenders, to maintain possession and also start attacking moves.

Traore was a regular and successful member of the Mali national team between 2001 and 2008.

== Managerial career ==
In July 2016, Traoré, a Muslim, was appointed as manager of the Jewish-supported Maccabi Créteil FC based in Paris.

== Honors ==
Paris Saint-Germain

- Coupe de France: 2009–10

Mali

- Africa Cup of Nations four place: 2004
