= Chicago Sister Cities International Cup =

Tournament details
- Host country: United States
- City: Chicago
- Dates: May 19–22, 2010
- Teams: 4
- Venue: 1 (in 1 host city)

Final positions
- Champions: (Serbia) Red Star
- Runners-up: (France) Paris Saint-Germain
- Third place: (Poland) Legia Warsaw
- Fourth place: (United States) Chicago Fire

Tournament statistics
- Matches played: 4
- Goals scored: 7 (1.75 per match)
- Top scorer: (Poland) Sebastian Szałachowski (2)

The Chicago Sister Cities International Cup (CSCIC) was a friendly soccer tournament hosted by the Chicago Fire in May 2010. The tournament invited football clubs from Chicago's sister cities of Belgrade, Paris and Warsaw. Red Star of Belgrade, Paris Saint-Germain, and Legia Warsaw were the clubs chosen to represent their respective cities.

== Tournament ==
The Chicago Sister Cities International Cup got very good media attention for a friendly tournament. The mayor of Chicago Richard M. Daley even proclaimed May 19–22 Chicago Sister Cities International Cup Days. In the proclamation, Mayor Daley had great words about the sport stating that it "brings together athletes in friendly competition, and forges new relationships bound by mutual admiration, solidarity and fair play...and urge all citizens to celebrate the close ties of friendship and exchange that Chicago shares with Warsaw, Paris and Belgrade." Mayor Daley received jerseys from all four clubs and welcomed them to their sister city. Media outlets in Poland, Serbia and France covered the games and almost all had very positive reviews on the concept of the tournament. At the start of the tournament the Chicago Fire elected to take on PSG with Red Star v Legia following immediately after. The two winners booked their tickets for the final for the inaugural season while the two losers would have a consolation match for third place.

== 2010 ==
Semi-finals

May 19
7:00 p.m.

Chicago Fire (United States)	0 – 1	(France) Paris Saint-Germain
	Report	Chantome 14'

Toyota Park, Bridgeview
Attendance: 9,254
Referee: Chris Penzo
May 19
9:00 p.m.

Red Star (Serbia)	1 – 0	(Poland) Legia Warsaw
Trifunović 75'	Report

Toyota Park, Bridgeview
Referee: Tyler Ploger

Third place match

May 22
7:00 p.m.

Chicago Fire (United States)	0 – 3	(Poland) Legia Warsaw
	Report	Iwański 59'; Szałachowski 63', 86'

Toyota Park, Bridgeview
Attendance: 12,234
Referee: Chris Penzo

Final

May 22
9:00 p.m.

Red Star (Serbia)	1 – 1	(France) Paris Saint-Germain
Cadú 73'	Report	Ceará 90'
Penalties
	7 – 6

Toyota Park, Bridgeview
Attendance: 12,354
Referee: Landis Wiley
