= Patrick Leugueun =

Cameroonian footballer (born 1981)

Personal information
- Full name: Patrick Claudel Leugueun Nkenda
- Date of birth: 25 February 1981 (age 45)
- Place of birth: Yaoundé, Cameroon
- Height: 1.83 m (6 ft 0 in)
- Position: Defender

Senior career*
Years	Team	Apps	(Gls)
2001–2003	Bordeaux	2	(0)
2003–2006	Istres	52	(2)
2006–2008	Guingamp	27	(2)
2008–2011	Vannes	63	(4)
2011–2012	AEL Limassol	7	(1)
2013–2016	Stade Bordelais	43	(0)
Total		194	(9)
- * Club domestic league appearances and goals

Patrick Claudel Leugueun Nkenda (born 25 February 1981) is a Cameroonian former professional footballer who played as a defender. With the exception of a half-year stint with Cypriot side AEL Limassol he spent all of his career in France, making over 100 appearances in Ligue 2.

His brother Serge Leugueun is also a footballer, but never played on a professional level.

== Honours ==
Vannes

- Coupe de la Ligue: runner-up 2008–09
