= Yves Bertucci =

French footballer (born 1962)

Personal information
- Date of birth: 24 October 1962 (age 64)
- Place of birth: Cannes, France
- Position: Midfielder

Team information
- Current team: Nantes (assistant)

Youth career
- Cannes

Senior career*
Years	Team	Apps	(Gls)
1980–1986	Cannes	154	(8)
1986–1989	FC Montceau	92	(20)
1989–1993	Tours	164	(6)
1993–1994	USL Dunkerque	40	(5)
1994–1996	Tours		

Managerial career
- 1996–1998: Tours B
- 1998–2008: Le Mans B
- 2008–2009: Le Mans
- 2009: Le Mans (assistant)
- 2009–2011: Paris Saint-Germain (assistant)
- 2013–2016: Lens (assistant)
- 2016–2018: Guingamp (assistant)
- 2019: Dijon (assistant)
- 2019–: Toulouse (assistant)
- * Club domestic league appearances and goals

Yves Bertucci (born 24 October 1962) is a French football manager and former player. He is the assistant head coach of Ligue 1 club Nantes.

He was assistant coach at Paris Saint-Germain, having in February 2009 being replaced by Daniel Jeandupeux as the manager of Le Mans Union Club.
