= Guillaume Ducatel =

French footballer (born 1979)

Personal information
- Date of birth: 21 January 1979 (age 47)
- Place of birth: Bully-les-Mines, France
- Height: 1.75 m (5 ft 9 in)
- Position: Midfielder

Youth career
- Lens

Senior career*
Years	Team	Apps	(Gls)
1999–2000	Lens	0	(0)
2000	Wasquehal	15	(0)
2000–2013	Boulogne	317	(24)

Managerial career
- 2014–: Le Touquet
- * Club domestic league appearances and goals

Guillaume Ducatel (born 21 January 1979) is a French former footballer who played as a midfielder. He spent the majority of his playing career with Boulogne, appearing for the club in all of the top four divisions of the French football league system and playing more than 300 league games in total in a 13-year spell.

In November 2014, Ducatel was appointed manager of sixth-tier club Le Touquet.

== Career ==
Ducatel began his career as part of the youth academy at French club RC Lens. He left the club in 2000, to join Championnat de France Amateurs side ES Wasquehal. Later that year, he joined French second tier club US Boulogne.
