= Jean-Eudes Maurice =

French footballer (born 1986)

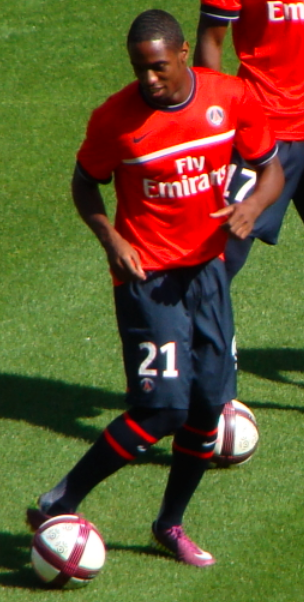
- Maurice playing for Paris Saint-Germain in 2011

Personal information
- Date of birth: 21 June 1986 (age 40)
- Place of birth: Alfortville, France
- Height: 1.80 m (5 ft 11 in)
- Position: Forward

Youth career
- 1998–2005: US Alfortville
- 2005–2007: UJA Alfortville
- 2007–2008: Paris Saint-Germain

Senior career*
Years	Team	Apps	(Gls)
2008–2014	Paris Saint-Germain	34	(1)
2011–2012	→ Lens (loan)	19	(1)
2012–2013	→ Le Mans (loan)	8	(0)
2014	Chennaiyin	8	(1)
2015	Nea Salamis	5	(1)
2015	Ermis Aradippou	0	(0)
2016	Sài Gòn	7	(2)
2017	Taraz	25	(4)
2018	Aktobe	14	(1)

International career^{‡}
2011–2016	Haiti	28	(12)
- * Club domestic league appearances and goals as of 11:23, 16 November 2019 (UTC) ‡ National team caps and goals as of 21:16, 14 October 2015 (UTC)

Jean-Eudes Maurice (born 21 June 1986) is a retired professional footballer. Born in France, he represented Haiti at the international level and was a member of the squad at the 2013 CONCACAF Gold Cup.

== Club career ==
Maurice began his career playing for his amateur local club US Alfortville. After spending seven years at the club, he moved up divisions joining UJA Alfortville. While playing here, he was noticed by Paris Saint-Germain and joined the club in 2007. He started out with the reserves appearing in 33 matches and scoring three goals. Maurice did appear on the bench with the first team, during the season, for a Coupe de France match against SC Bastia, but did not make an appearance. On 19 June 2008, he signed his first professional contract agreeing to a one-year deal. He was officially promoted to the senior team and was assigned the number 21 shirt.

For the 2008–09 season, Maurice made no league appearances, but did make his professional debut in the club's first leg 0–0 draw against Ukrainian club Dynamo Kyiv in the UEFA Cup, coming on as a substitute in the 75th minute. That was his only appearance of the season. On 11 May 2009, he signed a three-year contract extension with the Parisian club until the year 2012.

=== Chennaiyin FC ===
In October 2014, Maurice signed a short-term deal with Indian Super League club Chennaiyin FC. He scored his first goal for the club in a defeat against FC Goa.

=== Nea Salamis ===
After Maurice's spell with Chennaiyin ended, he signed for Nea Salamis in Cypriot First Division. He penned a six-month deal with the Cypriot club. He made his debut against Anorthosis, to be substituted in the 62nd minute.

=== Taraz ===
In March 2017, Maurice signed a one-year contract with Kazakhstan Premier League side FC Taraz.

=== Aktobe ===
Maurice moved to fellow Kazakhstani side FC Aktobe in March 2018.

=== UR Namur ===
After a trial and a few friendly games, Maurice signed with UR Namur in the fourth Belgian Division at the end of January 2020. He signed a one-year contract. His first official appearance for the club came in March 2020.

== Career statistics ==
=== Club ===
As of match played 25 August 2017

Appearances and goals by club, season and competition
Club	Season	League			National cup		League cup		Continental		Other		Total	
Club	Season	Division	Apps	Goals	Apps	Goals	Apps	Goals	Apps	Goals	Apps	Goals	Apps	Goals
Paris Saint-Germain	2008–09	Ligue 1	0	0	0	0	0	0	1 (Note: Appearances in UEFA Europa League)	0	—		1	0
Paris Saint-Germain	2009–10	Ligue 1	23	1	3	1	2	1	0	0	—		28	3
Paris Saint-Germain	2010–11	Ligue 1	10	0	2	0	1	0	8	0	0	0	21	0
Paris Saint-Germain	2011–12	Ligue 1	1	0	0	0	0	0	2	0	0	0	3	0
Paris Saint-Germain	Total		34	1	5	1	3	1	11	0	0	0	53	3
Lens (loan)	2011–12	Ligue 2	19	1	0	0	1	0	—		—		20	1
Le Mans (loan)	2012–13	Ligue 2	8	0	1	0	0	0	—		—		9	0
Chennaiyin	2014	Indian Super League	8	1	—		—		—		—		8	1
Nea Salamis	2014–15	Cypriot First Division	5	1	0	0	—		—		—		5	1
Sài Gòn	2016	V.League 1	7	2			—		—		—		7	2
Taraz	2017	Kazakhstan Premier League	25	4	1	0	—		—		—		26	4
Aktobe	2018	Kazakhstan Premier League	14	1	1	0	—		—		—		15	1
Career total			120	11	7	1	4	1	11	0	0	0	143	13

=== International ===
Appearances and goals by national team and year
National team	Year	Apps	Goals
Haiti	2011	6	5
Haiti	2012	2	2
Haiti	2013	7	2
Haiti	2014	1	0
Haiti	2015	7	2
Haiti	2016	5	0
Total		28	12

As of 14 October 2015
Scores and results list Haiti's goal tally first, score column indicates score after each Maurice goal.

List of international goals scored by Jean-Eudes Maurice
No.	Date	Venue	Opponent	Score	Result	Competition
1	2 September 2011	Stade Sylvio Cator, Port-au-Prince, Haiti	U.S. Virgin Islands	2–0	6–0	2014 World Cup qualification
2	7 October 2011	Paul E. Joseph Stadium, Saint Croix, U.S. Virgin Islands	U.S. Virgin Islands	1–0	7–0	2014 World Cup qualification
3	7 October 2011	Paul E. Joseph Stadium, Saint Croix, U.S. Virgin Islands	U.S. Virgin Islands	5–0	7–0	2014 World Cup qualification
4	7 October 2011	Paul E. Joseph Stadium, Saint Croix, U.S. Virgin Islands	U.S. Virgin Islands	7–0	7–0	2014 World Cup qualification
5	11 October 2011	Stade Sylvio Cator, Port-au-Prince, Haiti	Curaçao	1–2	2–2	2014 World Cup qualification
6	8 September 2012	Stade Sylvio Cator, Port-au-Prince, Haiti	Saint Martin	7–0	7–0	2012 Caribbean Championship qualification
7	10 September 2012	Stade Sylvio Cator, Port-au-Prince, Haiti	Bermuda	3–1	3–1	2012 Caribbean Championship qualification
8	12 September 2012	Stade Sylvio Cator, Port-au-Prince, Haiti	Puerto Rico	2–1	2–1	2012 Caribbean Championship qualification
9	13 July 2013	Sun Life Stadium, Miami Gardens, United States	Trinidad and Tobago	1–0	2–0	2013 CONCACAF Gold Cup
10	13 July 2013	Sun Life Stadium, Miami Gardens, United States	Trinidad and Tobago	2–0	2–0	2013 CONCACAF Gold Cup
11	4 September 2015	National Cricket Stadium, St. George's, Grenada	Grenada	1–0	3–1	2018 FIFA World Cup qualification
12	9 October 2015	BBVA Compass Stadium, Houston, United States	El Salvador	3–0	3–1	Friendly

== Honours ==
Paris Saint-Germain

- Coupe de France: 2009–10
