= Jérémy Clément =

French footballer (born 1984)

Jérémy Clement
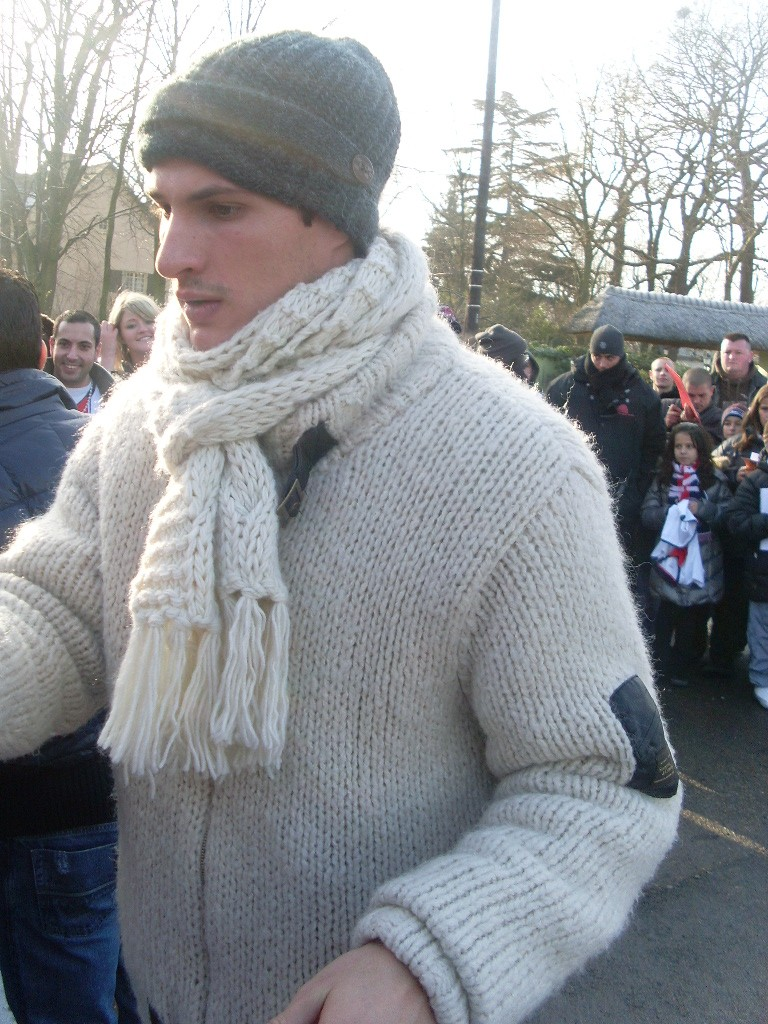
- Clément in 2009

Personal information
- Date of birth: 26 August 1984 (age 42)
- Place of birth: Béziers, France
- Height: 1.80 m (5 ft 11 in)
- Position: Midfielder

Youth career
- –1997: Rives SF
- 1997–2003: Lyon

Senior career*
Years	Team	Apps	(Gls)
2003–2006	Lyon	34	(1)
2006–2007	Rangers	19	(0)
2007–2011	Paris Saint-Germain	140	(5)
2011–2017	Saint-Étienne	158	(1)
2017–2019	Nancy	29	(0)
2019–2020	Bourgoin-Jallieu	18	(0)
Total		398	(7)

Managerial career
- 2020–2022: Bougoin-Jallieu
- * Club domestic league appearances and goals

Jérémy Clément (born 26 August 1984) is a French professional football manager and former player. Playing as a midfielder, he spent most of his career with two clubs, Paris Saint-Germain and Saint-Étienne.

== Playing career ==
Though born in Béziers, Clément was raised in Rives, Isère, and started his career at Rives SF.

Clément, who was formed by Ligue 1 club Lyon, joined Rangers on 7 July 2006 on a three-year contract after a £1.1 million deal was agreed between the two clubs. In joining Rangers, Clément linked up with his former Lyon manager Paul Le Guen and former assistant manager Yves Colleu, however, the latter duo both departed the club on 4 January 2007. Le Guen was not out of work for long and in his role as manager of Paris Saint-Germain, he entered the race to sign Clément. The midfielder's previous club, Lyon, were also interested. On 25 January 2007, the Rangers confirmed Clément had re-joined Le Guen at PSG, turning down Lyon in the process with the fee reported to be around £1.8 million.

In July 2011, Clément signed for Saint-Étienne.

In June 2019, after two seasons with Nancy, he agreed a move to fifth-tier side Bourgoin-Jallieu.

In April 2020, after his club's season had been ended prematurely due to the COVID-19 pandemic, Clement announced his retirement from playing.

== Managerial career ==
Ahead of the 2020–21 season, Clément was appointed as joint-manager of Bourgoin-Jallieu alongside Laurent Rugelj. He became the club's sole head coach after the departure of Rugelj in December 2020. After two years at the club, the parties decided by mutual agreement, not to extend the contract. Clément left the position at the end of the 2021-22 season.

== Personal life ==
Clément was tested for Swine flu H1N1 virus in October 2009 along with two PSG teammates, Ludovic Giuly and Mamadou Sakho. This led to the league postponing Marseille's match with Paris Saint-Germain.

== Honours ==
Lyon

- Ligue 1: 2004–05, 2005–06
- Trophée des Champions: 2005

Paris Saint-Germain

- Coupe de France: 2009–10
- Coupe de la Ligue: 2007–08
