= Albert Baning =

Cameroonian footballer

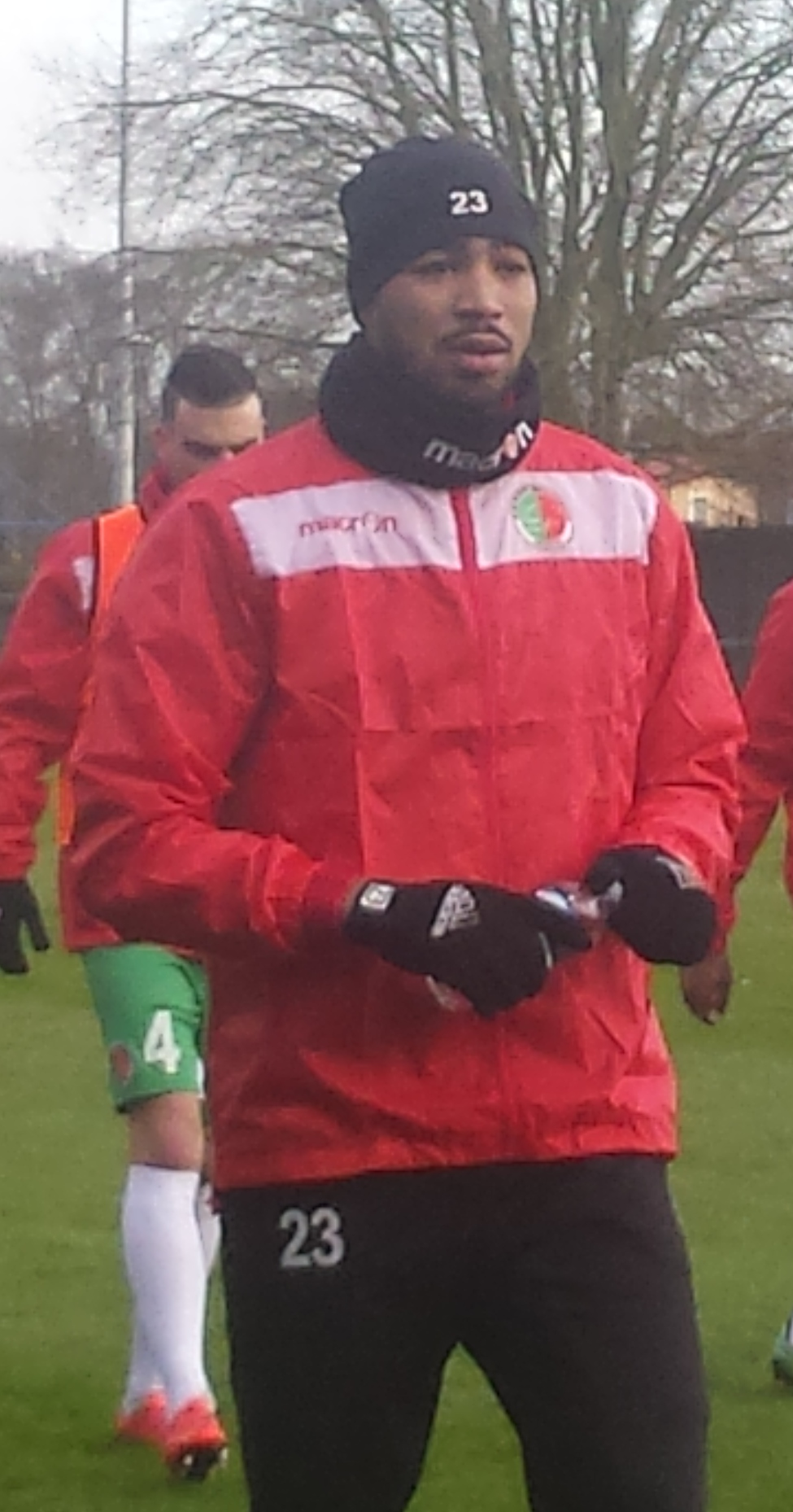
- Albert Baning in 2015.

Personal information
- Full name: Albert Legrand Baning
- Date of birth: 19 March 1985 (age 41)
- Place of birth: Douala, Cameroon
- Height: 1.93 m (6 ft 4 in)
- Position: Midfielder

Youth career
- Brasseries Cameroun
- 2001–2002: Dalian Shide

Senior career*
Years	Team	Apps	(Gls)
2003–2005	Dalian Shide	0	(0)
2004–2005	→ Shanghai United (loan)	49	(7)
2005–2006	Aarau	17	(3)
2006–2010	Paris Saint-Germain	1	(0)
2007–2008	→ Sedan (loan)	26	(0)
2008–2009	→ Grenoble (loan)	19	(1)
2010	→ Strasbourg (loan)	10	(0)
2010	Maccabi Tel Aviv	1	(0)
2012–2013	FC Metz	15	(0)
2013	Slavia Sofia	6	(0)
2014–2016	Sedan	25	(1)
2016–2017	RC France	?	(?)
2018–2020	FC Gueugnon	47	(4)

International career
2008	Cameroon U23	2	(0)
- * Club domestic league appearances and goals as of 8 March 2020

Albert Legrand Baning (born 19 March 1985) is a Cameroonian footballer who plays as a midfielder.

Baning previously played in countries like China, Switzerland, France, Israel and Bulgaria.

== Club career ==
Baning played for Swiss side FC Aarau before joining his former club Paris Saint-Germain in July 2006.

His transfer was largely engineered by new team president Alain Cayzac. PSG's coach, Guy Lacombe, has admitted to never actually having seen him play.

He joined the club RC Strasbourg, 26 January 2010 as a loan.

On 27 June Baning signed a one-year contract with the famous Israeli club of Maccabi Tel Aviv. On 1 Sep 2010 Maccabi announced that Baning is released from his contract due to mutual consent following an injury he is suffering from.

In early 2014, Baning joined French club Sedan.

== International career ==
True to his name, Baning was sent off twice in three games for Cameroon at the 2008 Beijing Olympics..
