= Mevlüt Erdinç =

Turkish footballer (born 1987)

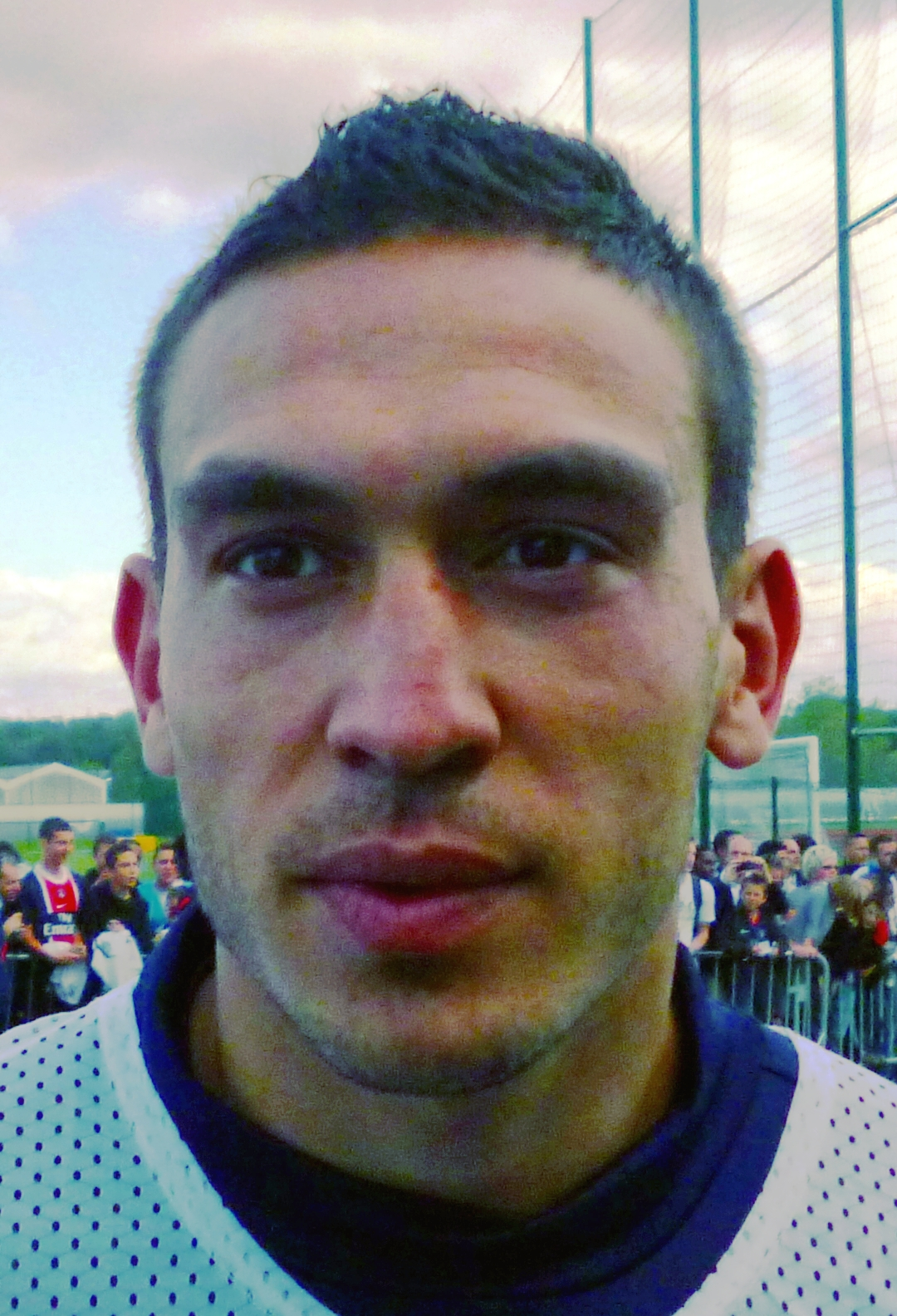
- Erdinç with Paris Saint-Germain in 2011

Personal information
- Full name: Mevlüt Erdinç
- Date of birth: 25 February 1987 (age 39)
- Place of birth: Saint-Claude, France
- Height: 1.81 m (5 ft 11 in)
- Position: Forward

Youth career
- 1996–1999: Saint-Claude
- 1999–2000: Jura Sud Fut
- 2000–2005: Sochaux

Senior career*
Years	Team	Apps	(Gls)
2005–2009	Sochaux	79	(24)
2009–2012	Paris Saint-Germain	76	(24)
2012–2013	Rennes	48	(15)
2013–2015	Saint-Étienne	53	(19)
2015–2017	Hannover 96	11	(0)
2016	→ Guingamp (loan)	15	(4)
2016–2017	→ Metz (loan)	24	(6)
2017–2019	İstanbul Başakşehir	16	(4)
2018–2019	→ Antalyaspor (loan)	24	(12)
2019–2020	Fenerbahçe	12	(0)
2020–2021	Fatih Karagümrük	30	(3)
2021–2022	Kocaelispor	8	(0)
2022	Ümraniyespor	2	(0)
2022	Racing Besançon	0	(0)
Total		398	(111)

International career
2004–2005	France U17	8	(3)
2005–2006	Turkey U19	12	(4)
2006–2007	Turkey U21	5	(2)
2008–2016	Turkey	34	(8)
Medal record
Representing Turkey
Men's Football
UEFA European Championship
Bronze medal – third place	2008 Austria & Switzerland
- * Club domestic league appearances and goals

Mevlüt Erdinç (surname spelt Erding in France; born 25 February 1987) is a former professional footballer who played as a forward.

Born in France to Turkish parents, he spent most of his career in his country of birth, recording 295 games and 92 goals in Ligue 1. He won the Coupe de France in 2007 and 2010, with Sochaux and Paris Saint-Germain respectively, and also represented Rennes, Saint-Étienne, Guingamp and Metz in France's highest division.

Erdinç played for France at under-17 level before switching to Turkey from under-19 onwards. He made his senior debut for the latter in March 2008 and represented them at UEFA Euro 2008, in which they were semi-finalists.

== Club career ==
=== Sochaux ===
Born in Saint-Claude, Jura, Erdinç began his development at his hometown club and Jura Sud Foot before joining the ranks of Sochaux in 2000.

Erdinç was promoted to the first-team squad in the 2005–06 Ligue 1 season, scoring a last-minute goal on his debut to gift his side a 1–0 victory away at Ajaccio. Despite early promise, it was not until the 2007–08 season that he was able to hold down a first-team place, becoming the club's top-scorer with 11 goals in 28 appearances in the process. Notably, he scored in the 1–0 win against Grenoble on the final day of the 2008–09 season; Sochaux needed at least a point in order to confirm their top flight status in Ligue 1 for the next season, thus securing their survival. He was their leading goal scorer for the 2008–09 season with 12 goals.

=== Paris Saint-Germain ===
Mevlüt signed for Paris Saint-Germain on 28 June 2009 on a four-year contract, for a reported €9 million transfer fee. Having previously scored 11 goals in the league for the past two seasons for relegation-threatened Sochaux, there was heavy speculation regarding his future prior to the move to PSG. Aston Villa, Fulham, Newcastle United and Wigan Athletic all reportedly showed interest in the player throughout May 2009, as well as French sides Bordeaux and Lyon.

He scored his first goal for PSG in a pre-season friendly match away to Fiorentina in Italy on 29 July 2009, a game in which PSG won 3–0. He also played against Rangers in the Emirates Cup on 1 August 2009, but failed to get on the score sheet.

He scored his first Ligue 1 goal for PSG in the second week of the 2009–10 season in PSG's 3–1 win at home to Le Mans. In his first month playing for the Paris club, he was selected as Ligue 1 Player of the Month in August by 31 percent of fans who voted on the official website. In late October 2009, a foot injury saw him ruled out of action for approximately four weeks, but nonetheless had still managed to score six league goals in 11 games by December.

In March 2010, Erdinç scored his first hat-trick for PSG in a 4–1 home win against his former club, Sochaux. He finished as PSG's top scorer in the 2009–10 Ligue and third-placed in the overall league scoring charts, having scored 15 goals in the league and 19 in all games. He was also voted Paris Saint-Germain's Player of the Year for the 2009–10 season.

Various injuries in the 2010–11 season meant that Erdinç could not capture his form from the previous year, and scored just nine goals, eight in Ligue 1. After the takeover of PSG in 2011 by the Qatar Investment Group and a number of high-profile arrivals, such as club-record signing of Javier Pastore for €42 million, Erdinç's place in the first-team looked in danger. Despite much interest from Newcastle United, Rennes and Galatasaray, it was confirmed that he would stay in Paris after an impressive start to the 2011–12 season. In his second game of the season, after coming on as a substitute, he scored in the 90th minute in a game against Toulouse to make it 2–1 and three minutes later, made an assist for Jérémy Ménez to score, ending the game 3–1.

On 23 September, after a series of successful performances, Erdinç was offered a one-year contract extension through to the end of the 2013–14 season.

=== Rennes ===
On 25 January 2012, receiving limited playing time under manager Carlo Ancelotti, Erdinç was transferred to Rennes for a €7.5 million transfer fee, signing a three-and-a-half-year contract.

=== Saint-Étienne ===
On 1 September 2013, transfer deadline day, Erdinç joined Saint-Étienne in a reported €4 million deal. He made his debut for Les Verts on 14 September, playing 81 minutes in the 3–1 win over Valenciennes. It took Erdinç until 24 November 2013 to score his first goal for Saint-Étienne, scoring the only goal in their away victory over Nice when he stole the ball from goalkeeper Lucas Veronese and tapped it into an empty net. He followed this up with four goals in his next five matches for the club, the final goal of a 4–0 victory over Stade Reims on 30 November, a consolation goal in a 3–1 defeat to former club Rennes, the equalizer in an eventual 2–1 Coupe de la Ligue defeat to former club PSG, and a penalty in Saint-Étienne's 2–0 defeat of Nantes on 21 December.

In the penultimate league match of the 2013–14 Ligue 1 season, Erdinç scored a first-half brace as Saint-Étienne defeated Nantes 3–1 at the Stade de la Beaujoire on 10 May 2014. He then scored Saint-Étienne's second goal, in between strikes from Loïc Perrin, in a 3–1 over Ajaccio on 17 May, securing a 20th league win of the season, fourth place in the league table and a spot in the 2014–15 UEFA Europa League. He finished his first season with Saint-Étienne as the club's top-scorer, netting 11 Ligue 1 goals and 12 in all competitions.

In Saint-Étienne's opening match of the 2014–15 Ligue 1 season, Erdinç scored both goals as the side completed a 2–0 win over Guingamp on 9 August 2014. In their next league fixture, he slotted a home a Romain Hamouma cross to secure a 3–1 come from behind victory over Reims, continuing the club's undefeated start to the season.

=== Hannover 96 ===
On 17 July 2015, Erdinç signed a three-year contract with Bundesliga side Hannover 96 for a reported fee of €3.5 million.

==== Guingamp (Loan) ====
On 7 January 2016, Erdinç was loaned to Guingamp for the remainder of the 2015–16 season. He went on to score 4 goals in 15 league appearances.

==== Metz (Loan) ====
On 10 June 2016, it was announced that Erdinç would spend the 2016–17 season on loan with newly promoted Ligue 1 side Metz.

=== İstanbul Başakşehir ===
On 13 July 2017, Erdinç moved to Turkey for the first time in his career, joining İstanbul Başakşehir. He was one of several internationals signed by the club that summer, among the others were Gaël Clichy, Eljero Elia, Gökhan Inler and Manuel da Costa.

At the end of his first season in his ancestral company, he told French regional newspaper Le Progrès that he wished to finish his career at the club.

==== Antalyaspor (Loan) ====
On 31 August 2018, Erdinç was loaned to Antalyaspor for 2018–19 season. On 31 May 2019, his loan agreement has finalized and Erdinç returned Başakşehir.

=== Fenerbahçe ===
On 30 August 2019, Erdinç joined Fenerbahçe S.K. on a two-season contract.

=== Fatih Karagümrük ===
On 3 September 2020, Erdinç signed with the newly promoted Süper Lig side Fatih Karagümrük.

=== Kocaelispor ===
In 2021 he signed with Kocaelispor, playing in the TFF 1. Lig.

=== Ümraniyespor ===
In 2022, he signed with Ümraniyespor, playing in the TFF 1. Lig, but terminated his contract at the end of 2021–22 season.

=== Racing Besançon and retirement ===
On 2 July 2022, Erdinç signed with Racing Besançon, playing in the Championnat National 2 ahead of 2022–23 season. Two months later, after not making an appearance for the club, he agreed the termination of his contract and announced his retirement.

== International career ==
Erdinç has dual nationality and was thus eligible to represent both Turkish and French internationally. He ultimately earned his first senior international cap, however, for Turkey on 26 March 2008 in a 2–2 draw with Belarus. On 10 May 2008, Fatih Terim announced Erdinç's inclusion in Turkey's 23-man squad for UEFA Euro 2008. He started in the first XI against Turkey's first opponent Portugal, though he was substituted after the first half in an eventual 2–0 defeat. Additionally, he came on as a second-half substitute in the semi-final against Germany, a 3–2 loss that eliminated Turkey.

On 11 October 2008, Erdinç scored his first international goal, the winner in a 2–1 home victory against Bosnia and Herzegovina in 2010 FIFA World Cup qualification. He added two away goals in qualification for the 2014 edition, opening a 3–1 loss to Hungary and concluding a 2–0 win over Romania, as Turkey again failed to reach the final tournament.

Terim named Erdinç in Turkey's preliminary 27-man squad for UEFA Euro 2016 in France, though he was one of four cut before the final deadline.

== Personal life ==
Erdinç is the youngest of eight children born to parents who emigrated from Yozgat, Turkey, to France in 1973. In January 2010, he received a medal of honour from his town of birth, Saint-Claude.

== Career statistics ==
=== Club ===
Appearances and goals by club, season and competition
Club	Season	League			National cup (Note: Includes Coupe de France, DFB-Pokal, Turkish Cup)		League cup (Note: Includes Coupe de la Ligue)		Continental		Total	
Club	Season	Division	Apps	Goals	Apps	Goals	Apps	Goals	Apps	Goals	Apps	Goals
Sochaux	2005–06	Ligue 1	10	2	3	0	0	0	—		13	2
Sochaux	2006–07	Ligue 1	4	0	0	0	1	0	—		5	0
Sochaux	2007–08	Ligue 1	29	11	2	0	1	0	1 (Note: Appearance in UEFA Cup)	0	33	11
Sochaux	2008–09	Ligue 1	36	11	1	0	1	1	—		38	12
Sochaux	Total		79	24	6	0	3	1	1	0	89	25
Paris Saint-Germain	2009–10	Ligue 1	31	15	6	4	0	0	—		37	19
Paris Saint-Germain	2010–11	Ligue 1	34	8	6	0	3	0	10 (Note: Appearances in UEFA Europa League)	1	53	9
Paris Saint-Germain	2011–12	Ligue 1	11	1	1	0	1	1	6	0	19	2
Paris Saint-Germain	Total		76	24	13	4	4	1	16	1	109	30
Rennes	2011–12	Ligue 1	12	4	2	0	0	0	—		14	4
Rennes	2012–13	Ligue 1	32	10	1	0	4	3	—		37	13
Rennes	2013–14	Ligue 1	4	1	0	0	0	0	—		4	1
Rennes	Total		48	15	3	0	4	3	—		55	18
Saint-Étienne	2013–14	Ligue 1	27	11	1	0	1	1	—		29	12
Saint-Étienne	2014–15	Ligue 1	26	8	5	1	1	0	4	0	36	9
Saint-Étienne	Total		53	19	6	1	2	1	4	0	65	21
Hannover 96	2015–16	Bundesliga	11	0	2	0	—		—		13	0
Guingamp (loan)	2015–16	Ligue 1	15	4	0	0	1	0	—		16	4
Metz (loan)	2016–17	Ligue 1	24	6	1	0	2	0	—		27	6
İstanbul Başakşehir	2017–18	Süper Lig	16	4	4	2	—		6	0	26	6
Antalyaspor (loan)	2018–19	Süper Lig	24	12	3	2	—		—		27	14
Fenerbahçe	2019–20	Süper Lig	12	0	7	4	—		—		19	4
Fatih Karagumruk	2020–21	Süper Lig	30	3	2	0	—		—		32	3
Kocaelispor	2021–22	TFF First League	8	0	1	1	—		—		9	1
Ümraniyespor	2021–22	TFF First League	2	0	0	0	—		—		2	0
Racing Besançon	2022–23	Championnat National 2	0	0	0	0	—		—		0	0
Career total			398	111	48	14	16	6	27	1	489	132

=== International ===
Scores and results list Turkey's goal tally first, score column indicates score after each Erdinç goal.

List of international goals scored by Mevlüt Erdinç
No.	Date	Venue	Opponent	Score	Result	Competition
1	11 October 2008	BJK İnönü Stadium, Istanbul, Turkey	Bosnia and Herzegovina	2–1	2–1	2010 FIFA World Cup qualification
2	16 October 2012	Ferenc Puskás Stadium, Budapest, Hungary	Hungary	1–0	1–3	2014 FIFA World Cup qualification
3	14 November 2012	Türk Telekom Arena, Istanbul, Turkey	Denmark	1–1	1–1	Friendly
4	10 September 2013	Arena Națională, Bucharest, Romania	Romania	2–0	2–0	2014 FIFA World Cup qualification
5	15 November 2013	5 Ocak Stadium, Adana, Turkey	Northern Ireland	1–0	1–0	Friendly
6	5 March 2014	19 Mayıs Stadium, Ankara, Turkey	Sweden	1–0	2–1	Friendly
7	30 May 2014	Robert F. Kennedy Memorial Stadium, Washington, D.C., United States	Honduras	1–0	2–0	Friendly
8	31 March 2015	Stade Josy Barthel, Luxembourg City, Luxembourg	Luxembourg	1–0	2–1	Friendly

== Honours ==
Sochaux

- Coupe de France: 2006–07

Paris Saint-Germain

- Coupe de France: 2009–10

Turkey

- UEFA European Championship third place: 2008
