= 2008–09 Paris Saint-Germain FC season =

36th season in existence of Paris Saint-Germain

Paris Saint-Germain
2008–09 season
- President: Charles Villeneuve (until 4 February 2009); Sébastien Bazin
- Head coach: Paul Le Guen
- Stadium: Parc des Princes
- Ligue 1: 6th
- Coupe de France: Round of 16
- Coupe de la Ligue: Semi-finals
- UEFA Cup: Quarter-finals
- Top goalscorer: League: Guillaume Hoarau (17); All: Guillaume Hoarau (20)
- Highest home attendance: 45,774 vs Marseille (15 March 2009)
- Lowest home attendance: 15,856 vs Nancy (12 November 2008)
- Average home league attendance: 40,902
Home colours	Away colours

The 2008–09 season was French football club Paris Saint-Germain's 36th professional season, their 36th season in Ligue 1 and their 35th consecutive season in French top-flight. Paris Saint-Germain was managed by Paul Le Guen. The capital club was chaired by Charles Villeneuve until Sébastien Bazin took over. Paris Saint-Germain was present in the 2008–09 Ligue 1, the 2008–09 Coupe de France and the 2008–09 Coupe de la Ligue. Last season's League Cup win allowed the capital club to participate in the 2008–09 UEFA Cup. Paris Saint-Germain's average home attendance for the 2008–09 season was 40,902, the second-highest in the Ligue 1.

Last season, Alain Cayzac resigned with four games remaining and Paris Saint-Germain was in the relegation zone. Cayzac was temporarily replaced by Simon Tahar, then succeeded by Charles Villeneuve, days after Paris Saint-Germain maintained Ligue 1 status and was defeated in the French Cup Final by Lyon. He had relatively high ambitions for Paris Saint-Germain and stated his expectations from coach and former player Paul Le Guen. Villeneuve declared that Paris Saint-Germain started the season with the prospect of regaining success and stability:

Sébastien Bazin, head of Colony Capital and shareholder of Paris Saint-Germain, offered me the presidency of the club and I accepted. Today, the day of my appointment, I had lunch for the first time with Paul Le Guen and told him that his place as coach was secured. I hope to build the team on a budget of 30 million euros. With some departures we would like to hire a great goalkeeper, one or two great strikers and a libero, and hopefully a good midfielder. My dream team would be like that of Chelsea's. They play very good and I hope Paris Saint-Germain can be like them.

— Charles Villeneuve, 27 May 2008

== News ==
City of Lens Mayor Guy Delcourt wanted the match to be replayed after PSG fans unfurled a racist banner midway through last season's League Cup Final. The match was not replayed, but Paris Saint-Germain were fined and banned from next's year edition. The measure was later overturned on appeal. Charles Villeneuve replaced Simon Tahar as president days after the club maintained Ligue 1 status and was defeated in the French Cup Final by Lyon. Charles Villeneuve announced that the Presidential Tribune was renamed the "Tribune Francis Borelli" to honor the former President. Pauleta, PSG's all-time top scorer with 110 goals, announced his retirement from professional football. Paris Saint-Germain announced that Lilian Thuram would not play for the capital club. His medical examination revealed heart abnormalities. Paris Saint-Germain and Rennes decided, by mutual agreement, to terminate discussions and negotiations concerning Jimmy Briand's transfer. Jérémy Clément signed a one-year contract extension until 2012. Guillaume Hoarau received the "France Football Golden Star" trophy for his performance in Ligue 2. Paris Saint-Germain refused a €0.3 million offer from Real Madrid for Yannick Boli as he was determined to succeed at Paris. Apoula Edel signed a new one-year contract extension until 2011.

The renovations of the Camp des Loges were completed on 4 October 2008. The entire process cost €5 million and was inaugurated on 4 November 2008. Guillaume Hoarau was named Player of the Month for October by the UNFP with 55% of the votes. Charles Villeneuve announced that Pauleta would become ambassador and supervisor of the capital club. Paul Le Guen won the UNECATEF Fidelidade Mundial "Le Coup du Coach." Stéphane Sessègnon was named Player of the Month for December by the UNFP with 55% of the votes. Paris Saint-Germain announced that Charles Villeneuve would resign from his mandate as president-general manager ahead of the General Assembly. The Camp des Loges was recognised by the FFF as one of the best pre-training centers in France, being classified as Elite, Class 1 and Class A in recent seasons. Sébastien Bazin was named the new president of Paris Saint-Germain. Péguy Luyindula was named Player of the Month for January by the UNFP with 55% of the votes. Guillaume Hoarau was named Player of the Month for February by the UNFP with 71% of the votes. Paul Le Guen left Paris Saint-Germain at the end of the season after the capital club decided not to renew his contract. Jean-Eudes Maurice signed a new three-year contract extension until 2012.

== Transfers ==
In

No.	Pos.	Nat.	Name	Age	EU	Moving from	Type	Transfer window	Ends	Transfer fee	Source
21	FW	(Haiti)	Jean-Eudes Maurice	22	EU	Youth system	Signed Pro ✓	Summer	2012		PSG.fr
27	MF	(France)	Joseph Muscat	22	EU	Youth system	Signed Pro ✓	Summer	2009		
4	DM	(France)	Claude Makélélé	35	EU	Chelsea (England)	Signed ✓	Summer	2010	Free	PSG.fr
10	AM	(Benin)	Stéphane Sessègnon	24	Non-EU	Le Mans (France)	Signed ✓	Summer	2012	€8M	PSG.fr
7	RW	(France)	Ludovic Giuly	32	EU	Roma (Italy)	Signed ✓	Summer	2011	€2.5M	PSG.fr
14	FW	(Serbia)	Mateja Kežman	29	EU	Fenerbahçe (Turkey)	Loan ✓	Summer	2009		PSG.fr
9	FW	(France)	Guillaume Hoarau	24	EU	Le Havre	Loan Return ✓	Summer	2012		Top Mercato
12	DM	(Cameroon)	Albert Baning	23	Non-EU	Sedan	Loan Return ✓	Summer	2010		
12	FW	(France)	Fabrice Pancrate	28	EU	Sochaux	Loan Return ✓	Summer	2009		
29	DM	(Democratic Republic of the Congo)	Youssuf Mulumbu	21	EU	Amiens	Loan Return ✓	Summer	2010		PSG.fr
13	CB	(Mali)	Sammy Traoré	32	EU	Auxerre	Loan Return ✓	Summer	2010		
16	GK	(France)	Stéphane Véron	22	EU	Auxerre	Signed ✓	Summer	2009	Undisclosed	PSG.fr
19	FW	(France)	Gaëtan Charbonnier	22	EU	Châtellerault	Signed ✓	Summer	2009	Free	PSG.fr

Total spending: ▼€10.5 million

Out

No.	Pos.	Nat.	Name	Age	EU	Moving to	Type	Transfer window	Transfer fee	Source
16	GK	(France)	Jérôme Alonzo	35	EU	Nantes	Contract Ended ✓	Summer	Free	
8	DM	(France)	Didier Digard	22	EU	Middlesbrough (England)	Transferred ✓	Summer	€5M	PSG.fr
10	AM	(Brazil)	Souza	29	Non-EU	Grêmio (Brazil)	Loaned ✓	Summer		PSG.fr
19	FW	(Brazil)	Éverton Santos	21	Non-EU	Fluminense (Brazil)	Loaned ✓	Summer		PSG.fr
11	FW	(Ivory Coast)	Amara Diané	26	Non-EU	Al Rayyan (Qatar)	Transferred ✓	Summer	€7M	PSG.fr
9	FW	(Portugal)	Pauleta	35	EU	Retired	Contract Ended ✓	Summer		L'Equipe
5	RB	(France)	Bernard Mendy	27	EU	Hull City (England)	Contract Ended ✓	Summer	Free	L'Equipe
6	CB	(Colombia)	Mario Yepes	32	EU	Chievo (Italy)	Contract Ended ✓	Summer	Free	Planete PSG
14	FW	(France)	David Ngog	19	EU	Liverpool (England)	Transferred ✓	Summer	€2M	PSG.fr
12	DM	(Cameroon)	Albert Baning	23	Non-EU	Grenoble	Loaned ✓	Summer		PSG.fr
29	FW	(France)	Yannick Boli	21	EU	Le Havre	Loaned ✓	Winter		L'Equipe
17	DM	(France)	Granddi Ngoyi	20	EU	Clermont	Loaned ✓	Winter		L'Equipe
27	LW	(France)	Younousse Sankharé	19	EU	Reims	Loaned ✓	Winter		L'Equipe
29	DM	(Democratic Republic of the Congo)	Youssouf Mulumbu	22	EU	West Bromwich Albion (England)	Loaned ✓	Winter		Sports.fr

Total income: ▲€14 million

== Squad information ==
N	Pos.	Nat.	Name	Age	EU	Since	App	Goals	Ends	Transfer fee	Notes
1	GK	(France)	Mickaël Landreau	30	EU	2006	98	0	2010	Free	
2	RB	(Brazil)	Ceará	28	Non-EU	2007	39	1	2010	€2.5M	
3	CB	(France)	Mamadou Sakho	19	EU	2007	18	0	2012	Youth system	
4	DM	(France)	Claude Makélélé (captain)	36	EU	2008	0	0	2010	Free	
6	CB	(France)	Grégory Bourillon	24	EU	2007	30	0	2011	€3M	
7	RW	(France)	Ludovic Giuly	32	EU	2008	0	0	2011	€2.5m	
8	FW	(France)	Péguy Luyindula	30	EU	2007	56	8	2010	€2.5M	
9	FW	(France)	Guillaume Hoarau	25	EU	2008	0	0	2012	€0.5M	
10	AM	(Benin)	Stéphane Sessègnon	24	Non-EU	2008	0	0	2012	€8M	
12	FW	(France)	Fabrice Pancrate	29	EU	2004	94	12	2009	€3M	
13	CB	(Mali)	Sammy Traoré	33	EU	2006	30	1	2010	€1.5M	
14	FW	(Serbia)	Mateja Kežman	30	EU	2008	0	0	2009	Loaned	
15	CB	(France)	Zoumana Camara	30	EU	2007	46	1	2011	€6M	
16	GK	(France)	Stéphane Véron	23	EU	2008	0	0	2009	Undisclosed	
17	RM	(Democratic Republic of the Congo)	Larrys Mabiala	21	EU	2006	6	0	2009	Youth system	
18	FW	(France)	Loris Arnaud	22	EU	2007	25	3	2010	Youth system	
19	FW	(France)	Gaëtan Charbonnier	20	EU	2008	0	0	2009	Youth system	
20	CM	(France)	Clément Chantôme	21	EU	2006	69	1	2011	Youth system	
21	FW	(Haiti)	Jean-Eudes Maurice	22	EU	2008	0	0	2012	Youth system	
22	LB	(France)	Sylvain Armand	28	EU	2004	189	7	2011	€3.5M	
23	DM	(France)	Jérémy Clément	24	EU	2007	55	1	2012	€2.2M	
24	LM	(France)	Tripy Makonda	19	EU	2008	0	0		Youth system	
25	LM	(France)	Jérôme Rothen	31	EU	2004	132	9	2011	€10.5M	
28	FW	(France)	Maxime Partouche	18	EU	2007	1	0		Youth system	
29	AM	(France)	Abdelaziz Barrada	19	EU	2008	0	0	2010	Youth system	
30	GK	(Armenia)	Apoula Edel	22	EU	2008	0	0	2011	€0.12M	

- Source: Ligue 1, Players in / out and Wikipedia players' articles

== Kit ==
Nike manufactured the kits for Paris Saint-Germain and the airline Emirates continued to be the club's main sponsor. Nike have been PSG's official kit provider since 1989. Emirates have been the club's partner since 2005 and the major shirt sponsor since January 2006. Emirates confirmed their commitment to PSG by extending the current partnership until 2014. Les Parisiens received brand new home and away kits. The home shirt had PSG's traditional colors. It was dark blue with a vertical red band and two thinner white stripes on the middle of the chest which disappeared under the main sponsor's logo in white writing. The borders of the sleeves were partly red. The away shirt had a simple design. Silver was the main color while the sponsor's logo was accented by a red background bordered by white and black thin stripes. The shirts had the club badge on the top-left, the Nike logo on the top-right and the club sponsor Fly Emirates written across the middle.

Home	Away

== Board & Staff ==
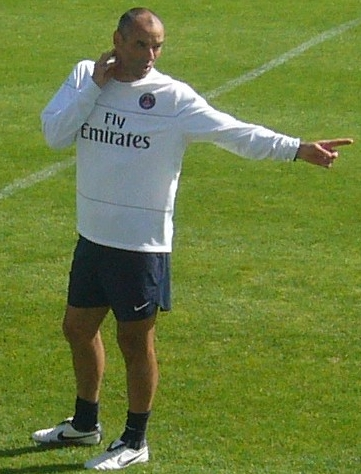
Paul Le Guen.

Manager	(France) Paul Le Guen
Assistant Coach	(France) Yves Colleu
Goalkeeping Coach	(France) Christian Mas
Physical Trainer	(France) Stéphane Wiertelak
Head Doctor	(France) Éric Rolland
Physiotherapists	(France) Bruno Le Natur, Joël Le Hir, Pascal Roche

Source: PSG.fr

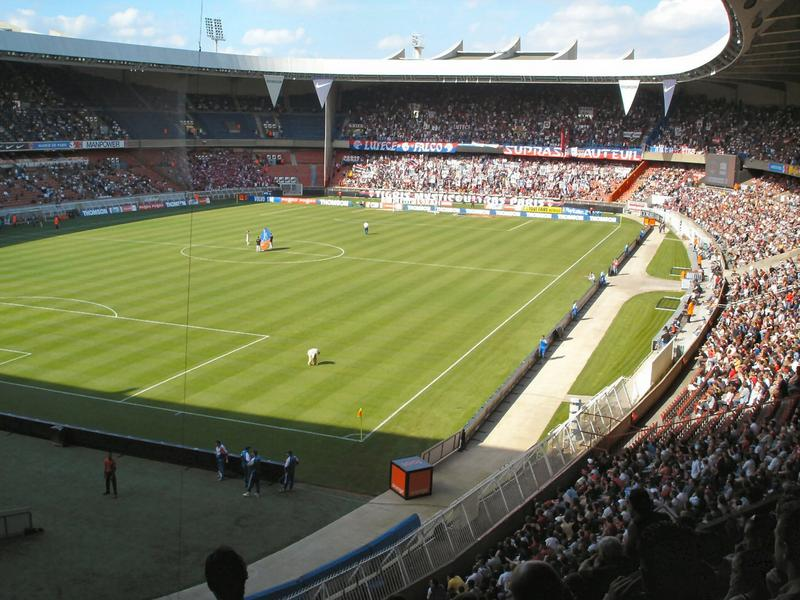
Parc des Princes.

President	(France) Sébastien Bazin
General Manager	(France) Phillipe Boindrieux
Communications	(France) Bruno Skropeta
Recruitment	(France) Alain Roche
Amateur Section	(France) Simon Tahar
Academy Director	(France) Bertrand Reuzeau
Ground (capacity and dimensions)	Parc des Princes (48,712 / 252m x 191m)

Source: Ligue 1

== Pre-season ==
Paris Saint-Germain opened their preseason campaign with a victory over Pontivy. The capital club then achieved a new triumph, this time over Ligue 2 side Châteauroux in Port Crouesty. Paris Saint-Germain continued their pre-season preparations for the coming season with a draw against Boulogne. The capital club then defeated Clermont scoring two unanswered goals and confirming that Paul Le Guen's squad is in top form just two weeks before the start of the 2008–09 campaign. Paris Saint-Germain recorded two consecutive victories over Belgian sides Gent and Roeselare with youngster Yannick Boli scoring his third goal in pre-season. Invited by Portuguese club Vitória de Guimarães for the first time, Paris Saint-Germain attended the Torneio Cidade de Guimarães, were Les Rouge-et-Bleu suffered a narrow defeat at the hands of the hosts in their opening match. Benfica showed great capacity and came back from two goals down to equalize against Paris Saint-Germain in the second day of the tournament. Just three days before the start of the season, Les Parisiens finished their pre-season preparations with a superb victory over Qatari side Al-Khor at the Camp des Loges. Paris Saint-Germain showed great character as the pre-season lived up to all its promise and more, being without any doubt a positive outing for Paul Le Guen's side.

=== Matches ===
9 July 2008 Friendly	Paris Saint-Germain	2–0	Pontivy	Arzon
19:00	Ngog 60'; Boli 86'			Stadium: Stade Yves Chapron; Attendance: 1,300

12 July 2008 Friendly	Paris Saint-Germain	2–1	Châteauroux	Écommoy
19:00	Hoarau 25'; Boli 64'		B. Sako 45'	Stadium: Stade Vaugeons; Referee: Ludovic Lecrenais

15 July 2008 Friendly	Boulogne	1–1	Paris Saint-Germain	Boulogne-sur-Mer
19:00	Ramaré 26'		Hoarau 31'	Stadium: Stade de la Libération; Attendance: 3,000

19 July 2008 Friendly	Paris Saint-Germain	2–0	Clermont	Blois
19:00	Sessègnon 69'; Hoarau 78'			Stadium: Stade des Allées Jean Leroi; Attendance: 5,000

23 July 2008 Friendly	Paris Saint-Germain	4–0	Roeselare	Bondoufle
20:00	Camara 5'; Chantôme 17'; Pancrate 56'; Boli 76'			Stadium: Stade Robert-Bobin

26 July 2008 Friendly	Paris Saint-Germain	2–1	Gent	Paris
17:00	Rothen 57'; Pancrate 65'		Azofeifa 78'	Stadium: Parc des Princes; Attendance: 10,000; Referee: Yohann Rouinsard

1 August 2008 Cidade de Guimarães Trophy	Vitória Guimarães	2–1	Paris SG	Guimarães, Portugal
22:15	Douglas 29'; Jean Coral 52'		Mabiala 56'	Stadium: Estádio D. Afonso Henriques; Attendance: 6,000; Referee: Olegário Benquerença (Portugal)

2 August 2008 Cidade de Guimarães Trophy	Benfica	2–2	Paris SG	Guimarães, Portugal
22:15	Makukula 74'; Cardozo 80'		Pancrate 38', 58'	Stadium: Estádio D. Afonso Henriques; Attendance: 8,000

6 August 2008 Friendly	Paris Saint-Germain	3–0	Al-Khor	Saint-Germain-en-Laye
10:00	Hoarau 60', 64'; Giuly 89'			Stadium: Camp des Loges

== Competitions ==
=== Ligue 1 ===
AS Monaco made a winning start against Paris Saint-Germain's expensively-assembled team with a late goal. Guillaume Hoarau scored his first Paris Saint-Germain goal as the capital outfit condemned last season's runners-up Bordeaux to their first defeat of the season at the Parc des Princes. Sochaux got their first point of the season with a hard-earned draw at home to PSG. Paris Saint-Germain made it three games without defeat as their improvement under Paul Le Guen continued with another Guillaume Hoarau goal earning them a narrow win at Caen. Paris Saint-Germain took an early lead from the spot through new signing Mateja Kežman and held out for the 90 minutes to take all three points at home to Nantes. Saint-Étienne picked up their first win in four matches as they beat Paris Saint-Germain. Nassim Akrour's third goal of the season gave promoted Grenoble an historic win over Paris Saint-Germain at the Parc des Princes. Paris Saint-Germain's poor recent run continued as they let slip an early lead to take only a point from Nancy. Paris Saint-Germain staged a come-from-behind win at home to Lorient with a late goal from substitute Loris Arnaud. Goals abounded as Paris Saint-Germain handed Marseille its first league defeat of the season, outscoring their arch-rivals four goals to two and denying them top spot on the table in a thrilling 'clasico' at the Stade Vélodrome. A bizarre own-goal from Zoumana Camara condemned Paris Saint-Germain to defeat at home to Toulouse. Paris Saint-Germain coach Paul Le Guen blasted his players for being too soft at half-time of their clash away to Nice, but despite an improved second-half display, the capital club fell to a second consecutive loss. Ludovic Giuly's first goal for Paris Saint-Germain was enough to earn all three against a resistant, if largely uninspired, Lille who saw their nine-game unbeaten run brought to an end at the Parc des Princes.

Paris Saint-Germain were too strong for Le Havre and took the points with goals from Guillaume Hoarau and Ludovic Giuly. Ludovic Giuly struck for the third time in as many games to give Paris Saint-Germain a narrow win over Lyon in the capital as the leaders' cushion at the top was reduced to five points. Rennes moved up to second in Ligue 1 after Bruno Cheyrou's first-half goal proved enough to give Guy Lacombe's side a narrow win over Paris Saint-German. A first half double from Ligue 1's leading scorer Guillaume Hoarau set the stage for Paris's win, their fifth in their last six matches, over Le Mans at the Parc des Princes. Stéphane Sessègnon struck twice against Auxerre to lift PSG into third as Paul Le Guen's men registered a fifth league win in six outings. In the race for second place behind autumn champions Lyon, Paris failed to keep the pace drawing at home to Valenciennes. Laurent Blanc's Bordeaux thumped four unanswered goals past Paris to go within one point of top spot on the table, giving faltering champions Lyon serious cause for concern in the race for the title. PSG made it six wins from their last nine matches when they beat a tough Sochaux outfit at the Parc des Princes. Guillaume Hoarau grabbed his 13th goal of the season as Paris Saint-Germain moved up to third in the table thanks to their win over Caen. Paris Saint-Germain closed to within a point of Ligue 1 leaders Lyon thanks to an emphatic victory over Nantes. Paris Saint-Germain registered their fourth Ligue 1 victory in a row against Saint-Étienne to move outright second in the standings, one point behind Lyon, ahead of the champions match at home to Le Havre. Paris Saint Germain remained second, but lost ground after they were held to a goalless draw at Grenoble. Paul Le Guen's men made it three wins in four matches as they completely dominated a tentative Nancy outfit to consolidate second place on the L1 table. A superb first-half strike from Ludovic Giuly and a Mickaël Landreau penalty save were enough to give Paris Saint-Germain a narrow win at Lorient and ease Paul Le Guen's side within a point of leaders Lyon.

Marseille are up to second in Ligue 1 after they emerged victorious over a ten-man Paris Saint-Germain in the 'classico'. Toulouse continued their string of strong results with a comprehensive win at home to Paris, their tenth victory in 14 matches in all competitions in 2009, to climb back to fourth place on the Ligue 1 table. Paris Saint-Germain beat Nice at the Parc des Princes to maintain their title challenge. Lille's goalless draw with visiting Paris was a case of two points dropped against an uninspired opposition and did little to help either side's fortunes, with both clubs leapfrogged by Toulouse, winners over Nantes. Paris Saint-German moved into fourth place as the club from the capital eased past bottom side Le Havre. Lyon and Paris Saint-Germain raised the curtain on a decisive weekend of football with a heart-stopping draw at the Stade Gerland which, in the end, suited neither side. Paris Saint-Germain missed out on the chance to go above Lyon into third as they were narrowly beaten by Rennes. Mateja Kezman's second league goal of the season gave Paris Saint-Germain a narrow win at Le Mans to keep them in contention for a top-three finish. Paris saw their chances of overtaking Lyon into third place and a Champions League qualifying spot dealt a blow as they succumbed to in-form Auxerre at the Parc des Princes. PSG's ambitions of European football were in the balance after they saw a stubborn Valenciennes side come from behind at the Stade Nungesser. Paris needed to win at home to Monaco to clinch fourth or fifth and a place in Europe next season, but a tepid display from Paul Le Guen's men in a goalless draw left them empty-handed after being tipped as potential title contenders throughout the season.

==== League table ====
Pos	Team	Pld	W	D	L	GF	GA	GD	Pts	Qualification or relegation
4	Toulouse	38	16	16	6	45	27	+18	64	Qualification to Europa League play-off round
5	Lille	38	17	13	8	51	39	+12	64	Qualification to Europa League third qualifying round
6	Paris Saint-Germain	38	19	7	12	49	38	+11	64	
7	Rennes	38	15	16	7	42	34	+8	61	
8	Auxerre	38	16	7	15	35	35	0	55	

Source: Ligue 1
Rules for classification: 1) points; 2) goal difference; 3) number of goals scored.
France's third UEFA Europa League spot went to Ligue 2 side Guingamp, winners of 2008–09 Coupe de France.

==== Results summary ====
Overall								Home						Away					
Pld	W	D	L	GF	GA	GD	Pts	W	D	L	GF	GA	GD	W	D	L	GF	GA	GD
38	19	7	12	49	38	+11	64	12	2	5	29	17	+12	7	5	7	20	21	−1

Source: Ligue 1

==== Results by round ====
Round	1	2	3	4	5	6	7	8	9	10	11	12	13	14	15	16	17	18	19	20	21	22	23	24	25	26	27	28	29	30	31	32	33	34	35	36	37	38
Ground	A	H	A	A	H	A	H	A	H	A	H	A	H	A	H	A	H	A	H	A	H	H	A	H	A	H	A	H	A	H	A	H	A	H	A	H	A	H
Result	L	W	D	W	W	L	L	D	W	W	L	L	W	W	W	L	W	W	D	L	W	W	W	W	D	W	W	L	L	W	D	W	D	L	W	L	L	D
Position	17	12	11	6	3	7	12	11	9	6	8	11	8	8	5	6	5	4	4	8	8	3	3	2	2	2	2	3	6	5	6	4	4	4	4	4	5	6

Source: Ligue 1
A = Away; H = Home; W = Win; D = Draw; L = Loss

==== Matches ====
9 August 2008 1	Monaco	1–0	Paris Saint-Germain	Fontvieille
21:00	Nimani 79'			Stadium: Stade Louis II; Attendance: 16,904; Referee: Stéphane Bré

16 August 2008 2	Paris Saint-Germain	1–0	Bordeaux	Paris
21:00	Hoarau 53'			Stadium: Parc des Princes; Attendance: 41,575; Referee: Alain Hamer

23 August 2008 3	Sochaux	1–1	Paris Saint-Germain	Montbéliard
19:00	Erdinç 49' (pen.)		Sessègnon 63'	Stadium: Stade Auguste-Bonal; Attendance: 16,791; Referee: Fredy Fautrel

30 August 2008 4	Caen	0–1	Paris Saint-Germain	Caen
19:00			Hoarau 5'	Stadium: Stade Michel d'Ornano; Attendance: 20,685; Referee: Olivier Thual

14 September 2008 5	Paris Saint-Germain	1–0	Nantes	Paris
21:00	Kežman 7' (pen.)			Stadium: Parc des Princes; Attendance: 43,005; Referee: Saïd Ennjimi

21 September 2008 6	Saint-Étienne	1–0	Paris Saint-Germain	Saint-Étienne
17:00	Dabo 14'			Stadium: Stade Geoffroy-Guichard; Attendance: 28,436; Referee: Stéphane Bré

27 September 2008 7	Paris Saint-Germain	0–1	Grenoble	Paris
21:00			Akrour 76'	Stadium: Parc des Princes; Attendance: 43,550; Referee: Thierry Auriac

5 October 2008 8	Nancy	1–1	Paris Saint-Germain	Tomblaine
21:00	Macaluso 33'		Hoarau 2'	Stadium: Stade Marcel Picot; Attendance: 18,217; Referee: Olivier Thual

18 October 2008 9	Paris Saint-Germain	3–2	Lorient	Paris
19:00	Pancrate 22'; Hoarau 48'; Arnaud 87'		Saïfi 12'; Abriel 38'	Stadium: Parc des Princes; Attendance: 38,529; Referee: Damien Ledentu

26 October 2008 10	Marseille	2–4	Paris Saint-Germain	Marseille
21:00	Niang 21'; Valbuena 45'		Hoarau 9', 82'; Luyindula 53'; Rothen 76'	Stadium: Stade Vélodrome; Attendance: 56,426; Referee: Laurent Duhamel

29 October 2008 11	Paris Saint-Germain	0–1	Toulouse	Paris
19:00			Camara 65' (o.g.)	Stadium: Parc des Princes; Attendance: 41,609; Referee: Tony Chapron

1 November 2008 12	Nice	1–0	Paris Saint-Germain	Nice
19:00	Mouloungui 39'			Stadium: Stade du Ray; Attendance: 12,438; Referee: Alain Hamer

9 November 2008 13	Paris Saint-Germain	1–0	Lille	Paris
21:00	Giuly 39'			Stadium: Parc des Princes; Attendance: 36,133; Referee: Philippe Kalt

15 November 2008 14	Le Havre	1–3	Paris Saint-Germain	Le Havre
19:00	Alassane 48'		Hoarau 18', 90' (pen.); Giuly 34'	Stadium: Stade Jules Deschaseaux; Attendance: 16,322; Referee: Damien Ledentu

22 November 2008 15	Paris Saint-Germain	1–0	Lyon	Paris
21:00	Giuly 25'			Stadium: Parc des Princes; Attendance: 44,780; Referee: Stéphane Lannoy

30 November 2008 16	Rennes	1–0	Paris Saint-Germain	Rennes
21:00	Cheyrou 45'			Stadium: Stade de la Route de Lorient; Attendance: 27,551; Referee: Saïd Ennjimi

7 December 2008 17	Paris Saint-Germain	3–1	Le Mans	Paris
21:00	Hoarau 23', 39'; Luyindula 87'		Cerdan 30'	Stadium: Parc des Princes; Attendance: 36,545; Referee: Lionel Jaffredo

13 December 2008 18	Auxerre	1–2	Paris Saint-Germain	Auxerre
19:00	Hengbart 86' (pen.)		Sessègnon 5', 22'	Stadium: Stade de l'Abbé-Deschamps; Attendance: 14,146; Referee: Éric Poulat

21 December 2008 19	Paris Saint-Germain	2–2	Valenciennes	Paris
17:00	Hoarau 27'; Rothen 72'		Mater 46'; Tiéné 83'	Stadium: Parc des Princes; Attendance: 43,878; Referee: Bertrand Layec

11 January 2009 20	Bordeaux	4–0	Paris Saint-Germain	Bordeaux
21:00	Diawara 10'; Cavenaghi 35'; Gourcuff 70'; Fernando 87'			Stadium: Stade Chaban-Delmas; Attendance: 31,910; Referee: Stéphane Lannoy

18 January 2009 21	Paris Saint-Germain	2–1	Sochaux	Paris
17:00	Hoarau 45+2' (pen.); Luyindula 63'		Svěrkoš 51'	Stadium: Parc des Princes; Attendance: 34,915; Referee: Éric Poulat

31 January 2009 22	Paris Saint-Germain	2–0	Caen	Paris
19:00	Hoarau 49'; Luyindula 58'			Stadium: Parc des Princes; Attendance: 39,187; Referee: Antony Gautier

7 February 2009 23	Nantes	1–4	Paris Saint-Germain	Nantes
19:00	Abdoun 36' (pen.)		Giuly 12', 50'; Luyindula 21'; Sessègnon 71'	Stadium: Stade de la Beaujoire; Attendance: 29,688; Referee: Alexandre Castro

14 February 2009 24	Paris Saint-Germain	2–1	Saint-Étienne	Paris
21:00	Sakho 26'; Clément 36'		Payet 33'	Stadium: Parc des Princes; Attendance: 42,366; Referee: Laurent Duhamel

21 February 2009 25	Grenoble	0–0	Paris Saint-Germain	Grenoble
19:00				Stadium: Stade des Alpes; Attendance: 18,097; Referee: Stéphane Lannoy

1 March 2009 26	Paris Saint-Germain	4–1	Nancy	Paris
17:00	Hoarau 9', 40'; Giuly 13'; Sessègnon 63'		Féret 30'	Stadium: Parc des Princes; Attendance: 38,302; Referee: Philippe Malige

7 March 2009 27	Lorient	0–1	Paris Saint-Germain	Lorient
19:00			Giuly 22'	Stadium: Stade du Moustoir; Attendance: 12,206; Referee: Didier Falcone

15 March 2009 28	Paris Saint-Germain	1–3	Marseille	Paris
21:00	Giuly 43'		Zenden 24'; Cana 61'; Koné 55'	Stadium: Parc des Princes; Attendance: 45,774; Referee: Bertrand Layec

22 March 2009 29	Toulouse	4–1	Paris Saint-Germain	Toulouse
21:00	Bergougnoux 5'; Gignac 39'; Sissoko 44'; Braaten 80'		Mabiala 70'	Stadium: Stadium de Toulouse; Attendance: 31,327; Referee: Fredy Fautrel

5 April 2009 30	Paris Saint-Germain	2–1	Nice	Paris
17:00	Hoarau 20'; Traoré 52'		Rémy 35'	Stadium: Parc des Princes; Attendance: 40,471; Referee: Thierry Auriac

12 April 2009 31	Lille	0–0	Paris Saint-Germain	Villeneuve-d'Ascq
18:45				Stadium: Stadium Lille Métropole; Attendance: 17,766; Referee: Lionel Jaffredo

19 April 2009 32	Paris Saint-Germain	3–0	Le Havre	Paris
17:00	Giuly 41'; Rothen 54'; Hoarau 90'			Stadium: Parc des Princes; Attendance: 38,114; Referee: Clément Turpin

24 April 2009 33	Lyon	0–0	Paris Saint-Germain	Lyon
20:30				Stadium: Stade de Gerland; Attendance: 38,827; Referee: Bertrand Layec

3 May 2009 34	Paris Saint-Germain	0–1	Rennes	Paris
17:00			Sakho 66' (o.g.)	Stadium: Parc des Princes; Attendance: 43,875; Referee: Fredy Fautrel

13 May 2009 35	Le Mans	0–1	Paris Saint-Germain	Le Mans
19:00			Kežman 18'	Stadium: Stade Léon-Bollée; Attendance: 12,815; Referee: Bruno Coué

16 May 2009 36	Paris Saint-Germain	1–2	Auxerre	Paris
21:00	Sessègnon 83'		Camara 40' (o.g.); Jeleń 45+1'	Stadium: Parc des Princes; Attendance: 40,870; Referee: Didier Falcone

23 May 2009 37	Valenciennes	2–1	Paris Saint-Germain	Valenciennes
21:00	Audel 61'; Pujol 67'		Kežman 12'	Stadium: Stade Nungesser; Attendance: 15,884; Referee: Lionel Jaffredo

30 May 2009 38	Paris Saint-Germain	0–0	Monaco	Paris
21:00				Stadium: Parc des Princes; Attendance: 43,665; Referee: Olivier Thual

=== Coupe de France ===
Paris Saint-Germain entered the French Cup having last won the cup in 2006 and having reached last season's final, narrowly losing to Olympique Lyonnais in a highly contested match. PSG started from the round of 64, as all Ligue 1 clubs did. The draw for the last-64 of the French Cup saw Paris Saint-Germain paired with CFA club Montluçon. Paris Saint-Germain squeezed through to the last-32 of the French Cup, but failed to impress against fourth division outfit, Montluçon. Paul Le Guen's side had Stéphane Sessègnon to thank for the only goal of the game. The draw for the last-32 pitted "Les Parisiens" with fourth tier side Gazélec Ajaccio. Paris Saint-Germain beat lower league opposition to progress to the last 16 of the French Cup. Mateja Kežman struck twice for PSG as they beat Gazélec Ajaccio. The Serbian striker scored once in either half before defender Sammy Traoré helped secure Paul Le Guen's men a place in the next round. Last season's losing finalists PSG were drawn away to third tier club Rodez for the last-16. Paris Saint-Germain were sensationally knocked out of the French Cup, succumbing to a defeat after extra-time to lowly Rodez.

==== Matches ====
4 January 2009 Round of 64	Montluçon	0–1	Paris Saint-Germain	Clermont-Ferrand
17:30	Lécluse (yellow card) 88'		Ceará (yellow card) 10'; Sessègnon 52'; Pancrate (yellow card) 89'	Stadium: Stade Gabriel-Montpied; Attendance: 8,000; Referee: Thierry Auriac

25 January 2009 Round of 32	Gazélec Ajaccio	0–3	Paris Saint-Germain	Ajaccio
17:30			Kežman 25', 61'; Clément (yellow card) 57'; Traoré 67'	Stadium: Stade Ange Casanova; Attendance: 4,000; Referee: Stéphane Bré

4 March 2009 Round of 16	Rodez	3–1 (a.e.t.)	Paris Saint-Germain	Rodez
18:00	Choplin 66', 115'; Pacios 119'		Traoré 10'; Rothen (yellow card) 31'; Kežman (yellow card) 103'; Armand (yellow card) 110'	Stadium: Stade Paul-Lignon; Attendance: 7,000; Referee: Damien Ledentu

=== Coupe de la Ligue ===
Holders Paris Saint-Germain were through to the last-16 of the League Cup after Fabrice Pancrate's goal proved enough for the reigning champions to beat AS Monaco. Paris Saint-Germain's defence of the League Cup continued against Nancy after the draw for the last-16, quarter-finals and semi-finals was made. Péguy Luyindula scored both goals in Paris Saint-Germain's victory over Nancy to send the holders through to the quarter-finals of the League Cup. In a dramatic twist of fate, Paris Saint-Germain hosted Lens in the pick of the quarter-final draw. In a remake of last season's Final, Paris Saint-Germain defeated Lens at the Parc des Princes to qualify for the semi-finals of the League Cup, where they met Bordeaux, winners over Châteauroux. Late goals from Souleymane Diawara and Wendel added to David Bellion's first-half strike put the icing on the cake as Bordeaux cruised past Paris Saint-Germain in the League Cup semi-final at the Parc des Princes.

==== Matches ====
24 September 2008 Round of 32	Monaco	0–1	Paris Saint-Germain	Fontvieille
17:00			Pancrate 34'; Mulumbu (yellow card) 62'	Stadium: Stade Louis II; Attendance: 5,581; Referee: Philippe Kalt

12 November 2008 Round of 16	Paris Saint-Germain	2–0	Nancy	Paris
21:00	Luyindula 30', 36'; Armand (yellow card) 52'		Calvé (yellow card) 49'	Stadium: Parc des Princes; Attendance: 15,856; Referee: Stéphane Bré

14 January 2009 Quarter-finals	Paris Saint-Germain	2–0	Lens	Paris
20:45	Keita 14' (o.g.); Ceará (yellow card) 48'; Rothen (yellow card) 81'; Clément 90+3'		Ramos (yellow card) 60'; Keita (yellow card) 63'	Stadium: Parc des Princes; Attendance: 32,093; Referee: Fredy Fautrel

4 February 2009 Semi-finals	Paris Saint-Germain	0–3	Bordeaux	Paris
20:45	Sessègnon (yellow card) 52'; Rothen (yellow card) 85'		Bellion 17'; Fernando (yellow card) 42'; Diawara (yellow card) 71'; Diawara 86'; Wendel 90+1'	Stadium: Parc des Princes; Attendance: 40,543; Referee: Saïd Ennjimi

=== UEFA Cup ===
Paris Saint-Germain entered the UEFA Cup at the first round, 18 months after their last European clash against Benfica on 15 March 2007. Sitting in third place on the Ligue 1, Paris Saint-Germain were taking on Turkish club Kayserispor, unbeaten in the Süper Lig. The hosts, however, lost their unbeaten record in the final minute thanks to Péguy Luyindula goal, just a few minutes after the Turkish side had equalized through Delio Toledo. Paris Saint-Germain qualified to the group stage at Kayserispor's expense in a scoreless match at the Parc des Princes. The capital club was inserted into Group A with German club Schalke 04, English side Manchester City, Spanish outfit Racing de Santander, and Dutch club Twente. Despite his faith in young players, Paul Le Guen's men were overwhelmed by the better organized and more experienced Germans, who were quickly firming as Group A favourites. Schalke went ahead early through Larrys Mabiala's own goal before Kevin Kurányi added to their tally, followed by Halil Altıntop. Clément Chantôme's far-post strike in stoppage time came too late in a game where Paris Saint-Germain struggled to find their rhythm as Schalke pushed forward relentlessly at the Veltins-Arena. Paris Saint-Germain blew a two-goal lead as Spanish side Racing Santander held the capital club to a draw at the Parc des Princes.

Paris Saint-Germain rued the missed opportunities in the second half of their goalless draw with Manchester City but still had a chance of qualifying for the next round. Paris Saint-Germain qualified to the last-32 after a dramatic victory over Twente at the Parc des Princes. Late goals from Mateja Kežman and Péguy Luyindula saw PSG clinch third spot in Group A ahead of Racing Santander on goal difference. Paris Saint-Germain reached the last-32 and received a tough draw being given Bundesliga side Wolfsburg. Giant striker Guillaume Hoarau marked his return by scoring two late goals as the side from the French capital finished over the top of German outfit Wolfsburg. Paris Saint-Germain walloped Wolfsburg in Germany for a convincing aggregate victory in the last-32. Paris Saint-Germain goalkeeper Mickaël Landreau made a number of good saves to deny before Péguy Luyindula put an end to Wolfsburg's hopes of a fightback by netting a penalty. Jérôme Rothen doubled the lead on the hour with a terrific strike. Wolfsburg's Japanese star Makoto Hasebe reduced the arrears with a fine solo goal three minutes later, but Luyindula netted his sixth goal of the competition with a header from Clément Chantôme's cross. Paris Saint-Germain, UEFA Cup Winners' Cup winners, marched into the last-16 where they faced Portuguese side Sporting Braga.

Paris Saint-Germain's European campaign was in the balance after they failed to break down a stubborn Braga side at the Parc des Princes. Jérôme Rothen came closest when he struck an upright in the second-half, which saw Mateja Kežman jeered onto the pitch by the PSG fans as he made his first appearance at the Parc since his infamous shirt-throwing incident during his side's League Cup semi-final defeat to Bordeaux last month. Guillaume Hoarau came off the bench to score the only goal of the game to give Paris Saint-Germain a win over Braga and see them join Marseille in the quarter-finals. The capital club was pitted against Ukrainian side Dynamo Kyiv and fared little better than Marseille as they were held goalless at the Parc des Princes. Paris Saint-Germain found their ambitions frustrated by a well-organised Dynamo side. A disastrous display by Mickaël Landreau saw Paris Saint-Germain tumble out. PSG travelled to Ukraine with hope, but were on the back foot throughout after Ismaël Bangoura had given Dynamo a fourth-minute lead. Péguy Luyindula struck a post with a header soon after, but Mickaël Landreau's poor goalkeeping put an end to PSG's European ambitions. He inadvertently punched a high ball into his own goal, before fumbling an Oleksandr Aliyev free-kick on the hour mark that allowed Ognjen Vukojević to score a third.

==== First round ====
18 September 2008 First leg	Kayserispor (Turkey)	1–2	(France) Paris Saint-Germain	Kayseri, Turkey
20:00	Toledo 87'	Report	Kežman 5'; Luyindula 89'	Stadium: Kayseri Atatürk Stadium; Attendance: 20,000; Referee: Kevin Blom (Netherlands)

2 October 2008 Second leg	Paris Saint-Germain (France)	0–0 (2–1 agg.)	(Turkey) Kayserispor	Paris, France
21:00		Report		Stadium: Parc des Princes; Attendance: 20,000; Referee: Jonas Eriksson (Sweden)

==== Group stage ====
Pos	Team	Pld	W	D	L	GF	GA	GD	Pts	Qualification	MC	TWE	PSG	RSA	SCH
1	(England) Manchester City	4	2	1	1	6	5	+1	7	Advance to knockout stage	—	3–2	0–0	—	—
2	(Netherlands) Twente	4	2	0	2	5	8	−3	6	Advance to knockout stage	—	—	—	1–0	2–1
3	(France) Paris Saint-Germain	4	1	2	1	7	5	+2	5	Advance to knockout stage	—	4–0	—	2–2	—
4	(Spain) Racing Santander	4	1	2	1	6	5	+1	5		3–1	—	—	—	1–1
5	(Germany) Schalke 04	4	1	1	2	5	6	−1	4		0–2	—	3–1	—	—

Source: RSSSF

23 October 2008 1	Schalke 04 (Germany)	3–1	(France) Paris Saint-Germain	Gelsenkirchen, Germany
18:15	Mabiala 12' (o.g.); Kurányi 39'; Altıntop 70'	Report	Chantôme 90+2'	Stadium: Veltins-Arena; Attendance: 48,919; Referee: Gianluca Rocchi (Italy)

27 November 2008 2	Paris Saint-Germain (France)	2–2	(Spain) Racing Santander	Paris, France
20:45	Kežman 5'; Luyindula 32'	Report	Traoré 40' (o.g.); Colsa 55'	Stadium: Parc des Princes; Attendance: 25,000; Referee: Pavel Kralovec (Czech Republic)

3 December 2008 3	Manchester City (England)	0–0	(France) Paris Saint-Germain	Manchester, England
20:45		Report		Stadium: City of Manchester Stadium; Attendance: 25,626; Referee: Bruno Paixão (Portugal)

18 December 2008 4	Paris Saint-Germain (France)	4–0	(Netherlands) Twente	Paris, France
20:45	Luyindula 8', 86'; Sessègnon 23'; Kežman 84'	Report		Stadium: Parc des Princes; Attendance: 30,000; Referee: Iain Brines (Scotland)

==== Knockout phase ====
===== Round of 32 =====
18 February 2009 First leg	Paris Saint-Germain (France)	2–0	(Germany) Wolfsburg	Paris, France
20:45	Hoarau 80', 83'	Report		Stadium: Parc des Princes; Attendance: 27,447; Referee: Svein Oddvar Moen (Norway)

26 February 2009 Second leg	Wolfsburg (Germany)	1–3 (1–5 agg.)	(France) Paris Saint-Germain	Wolfsburg, Germany
19:00	Hasebe 63'	Report	Luyindula 38' (pen.), 73'; Rothen 60'	Stadium: Volkswagen Arena; Attendance: 20,205; Referee: Vladimír Hriňák (Slovakia)

===== Round of 16 =====
12 March 2009 First leg	Paris Saint-Germain (France)	0–0	(Portugal) Braga	Paris, France
20:15		Report		Stadium: Parc des Princes; Attendance: 35,000; Referee: Matteo Trefoloni (Italy)

19 March 2009 Second leg	Braga (Portugal)	0–1 (0–1 agg.)	(France) Paris Saint-Germain	Braga, Portugal
21:30		Report	Hoarau 81'	Stadium: Estádio Municipal; Attendance: 16,371; Referee: Craig Thomson (Scotland)

===== Quarter-finals =====
9 April 2009 First leg	Paris Saint-Germain (France)	0–0	(Ukraine) Dynamo Kyiv	Paris, France
20:45		Report		Stadium: Parc des Princes; Attendance: 41,000; Referee: Pieter Vink (Netherlands)

16 April 2009 Second leg	Dynamo Kyiv (Ukraine)	3–0 (3–0 agg.)	(France) Paris Saint-Germain	Kyiv, Ukraine
18:30	Bangoura 4'; Landreau 16' (o.g.); Vukojević 61'	Report		Stadium: Lobanovsky Dynamo Stadium; Attendance: 16,300; Referee: Frank De Bleeckere (Belgium)

== Start formations ==
Qnt	Formation	Match(es)
41	4-4-2	L1 (29), CL (2), CF (3), UC (7)
9	4-2-3-1	L1 (6), CL (1), UC (2)
2	4-4-1-1	L1 (1), UC (1)
2	4-1-2-3	L1 (2)
1	4-3-3	UC (1)
1	4-1-2-1-2	CL (1)
1	4-3-2-1	UC (1)

Source: PSG.fr
Only competitive matches.

Starting XI

No.	Pos.	Nat.	Name	MS	Notes
1	GK	(France)	Mickaël Landreau	53	
2	RB	(Brazil)	Ceará	52	
15	CB	(France)	Zoumana Camara	52	
3	CB	(France)	Mamadou Sakho	33	
22	LB	(France)	Sylvain Armand	53	
25	LW	(France)	Jérôme Rothen	49	
23	DM	(France)	Jérémy Clément	51	
4	DM	(France)	Claude Makélélé	40	
10	AM	(Benin)	Stéphane Sessègnon	49	
8	FW	(France)	Péguy Luyindula	51	
9	FW	(France)	Guillaume Hoarau	47	

Source: Squad stats and Start formations.
Only competitive matches.
Using the most used start formation.
Ordered by position on pitch (from back right to front left).

== Appearances and goals ==
No.	Pos	Nat	Player	Total		Ligue 1		Coupe de la Ligue		Coupe de France		UEFA Cup	
No.	Pos	Nat	Player	Apps	Goals	Apps	Goals	Apps	Goals	Apps	Goals	Apps	Goals
1	GK	(France) FRA	Mickaël Landreau	53	0	38	0	3	0	2	0	10	0
30	GK	(Armenia) ARM	Apoula Edel	4	0	0	0	1	0	1	0	2	0
2	DF	(Brazil) BRA	Ceará	52	0	37	0	3	0	3	0	9	0
3	DF	(France) FRA	Mamadou Sakho	33	1	23	1	3	0	1	0	6	0
6	DF	(France) FRA	Grégory Bourillon	18	0	8	0	3	0	1	0	6	0
13	DF	(Mali) MLI	Sammy Traoré	33	3	19	1	1	0	3	2	10	0
15	DF	(France) FRA	Zoumana Camara	52	0	36	0	4	0	3	0	9	0
17	DF	(Democratic Republic of the Congo) COD	Larrys Mabiala	7	1	2	1	1	0	0	0	4	0
22	DF	(France) FRA	Sylvain Armand	53	0	35	0	4	0	3	0	11	0
4	MF	(France) FRA	Claude Makélélé	40	0	34	0	0	0	1	0	5	0
10	MF	(Benin) BEN	Stéphane Sessègnon	49	7	34	5	4	0	2	1	9	1
20	MF	(France) FRA	Clément Chantôme	36	1	21	0	3	0	2	0	10	1
23	MF	(France) FRA	Jérémy Clément	51	2	35	1	4	1	3	0	9	0
24	MF	(France) FRA	Tripy Makonda	8	0	4	0	0	0	1	0	3	0
25	MF	(France) FRA	Jérôme Rothen	49	4	34	3	3	0	2	0	10	1
26	MF	(France) FRA	Granddi Ngoyi	1	0	0	0	0	0	0	0	1	0
27	MF	(France) FRA	Younousse Sankharé	8	0	2	0	2	0	0	0	4	0
29	MF	(Democratic Republic of the Congo) COD	Youssouf Mulumbu	3	0	0	0	1	0	0	0	2	0
7	FW	(France) FRA	Ludovic Giuly	42	9	34	9	1	0	3	0	4	0
8	FW	(France) FRA	Péguy Luyindula	51	13	34	5	4	2	1	0	12	6
9	FW	(France) FRA	Guillaume Hoarau	47	20	33	17	2	0	3	0	9	3
12	FW	(France) FRA	Fabrice Pancrate	37	2	22	1	4	1	2	0	9	0
14	FW	(Serbia) SRB	Mateja Kežman	35	8	21	3	4	0	2	2	8	3
18	FW	(France) FRA	Loris Arnaud	3	1	1	1	0	0	0	0	2	0
21	FW	(Haiti) HAI	Jean-Eudes Maurice	1	0	0	0	0	0	0	0	1	0
28	FW	(France) FRA	Maxime Partouche	2	0	1	0	0	0	0	0	1	0
29	FW	(France) FRA	Yannick Boli	1	0	1	0	0	0	0	0	0	0

== Other statistics ==
No.	Pos.	Nat.	Player	Assists	Minutes Played	Yellow card	Yellow card Red card	Red card
1	GK	(France)	Mickaël Landreau	0	4800	1	0	0
30	GK	(Armenia)	Apoula Edel	0	360	0	0	0
2	DF	(Brazil)	Ceará	7	4545	6	0	0
3	DF	(France)	Mamadou Sakho	0	2545	2	0	0
6	DF	(France)	Grégory Bourillon	0	1217	2	0	0
13	DF	(Mali)	Sammy Traoré	2	2603	1	0	0
15	DF	(France)	Zoumana Camara	0	4644	3	0	1
17	DF	(Democratic Republic of the Congo)	Larrys Mabiala	0	359	0	0	0
22	DF	(France)	Sylvain Armand	5	4694	8	0	0
4	MF	(France)	Claude Makélélé	1	3297	9	0	0
10	MF	(Benin)	Stéphane Sessègnon	8	3890	8	0	0
20	MF	(France)	Clément Chantôme	3	1667	3	0	0
23	MF	(France)	Jérémy Clément	2	4172	4	0	0
24	MF	(France)	Tripy Makonda	0	448	0	0	0
25	MF	(France)	Jérôme Rothen	4	4091	6	0	0
26	MF	(France)	Granddi Ngoyi	0	90	1	0	0
27	MF	(France)	Younousse Sankharé	0	350	0	0	0
29	MF	(Democratic Republic of the Congo)	Youssouf Mulumbu	0	212	2	0	0
7	FW	(France)	Ludovic Giuly	5	2791	2	0	0
8	FW	(France)	Péguy Luyindula	3	2988	3	0	0
9	FW	(France)	Guillaume Hoarau	4	3521	5	0	0
12	FW	(France)	Fabrice Pancrate	1	1498	3	0	0
14	FW	(Serbia)	Mateja Kežman	4	1745	4	0	0
18	FW	(France)	Loris Arnaud	0	96	0	0	0
21	FW	(Haiti)	Jean-Eudes Maurice	0	15	0	0	0
28	FW	(France)	Maxime Partouche	0	20	0	0	0
29	FW	(France)	Yannick Boli	0	10	0	0	0

Source: Ligue 1 and UEFA
Only competitive matches
(yellow card) = Number of bookings; (second yellow card) = Number of sending offs after a second yellow card; (red card) = Number of sending offs by a direct red card.
