= Yacine Brahimi =

Footballer (born 1990)

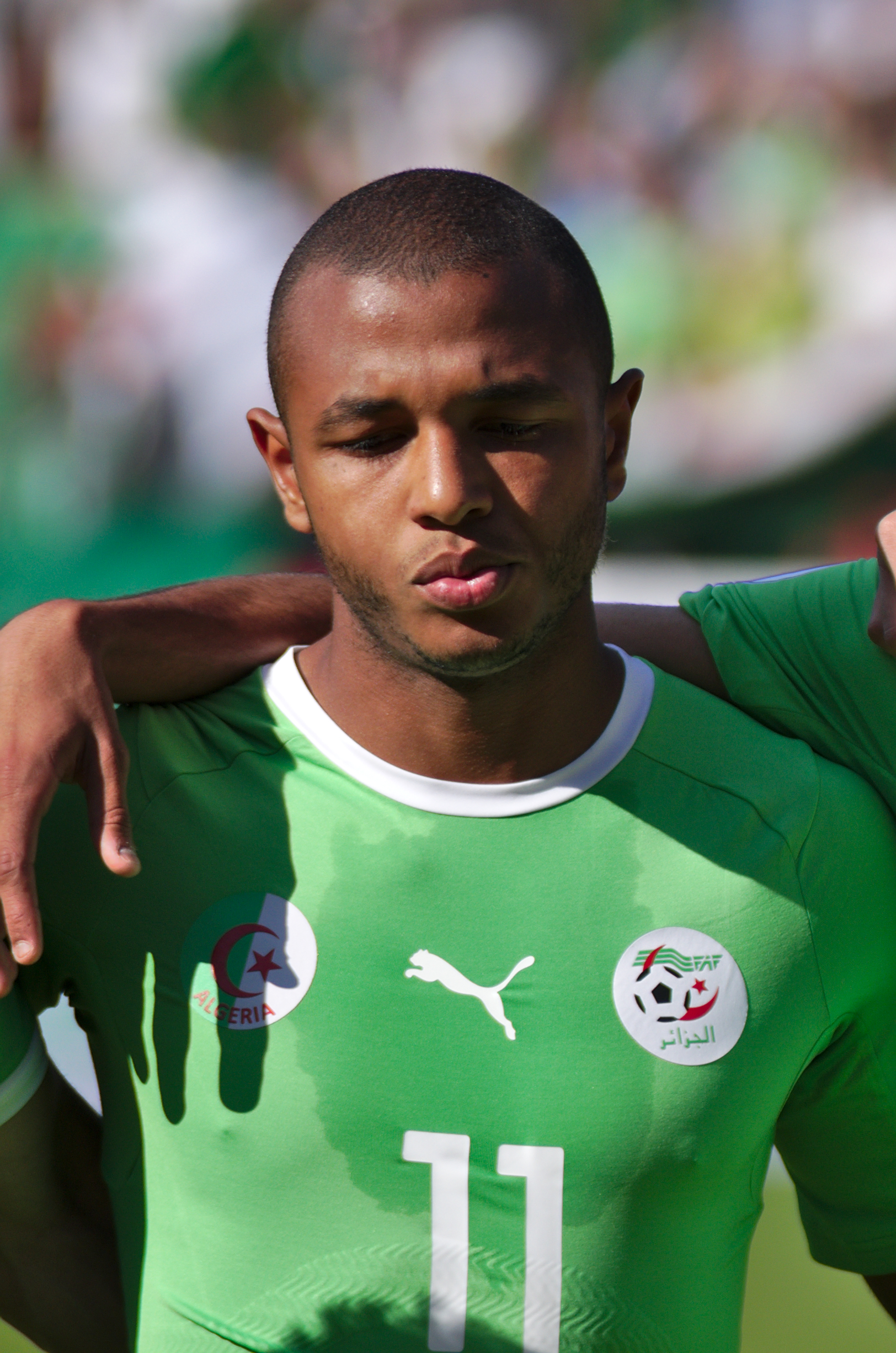
- Brahimi lining up for Algeria in 2014

Personal information
- Full name: Yacine Nasreddine Brahimi
- Date of birth: 8 February 1990 (age 36)
- Place of birth: Paris, France
- Height: 1.75 m (5 ft 9 in)
- Positions: Winger; attacking midfielder

Team information
- Current team: Al-Gharafa
- Number: 8

Youth career
- 1997–2000: Montreuil
- 2000–2004: Vincennois
- 2003–2006: Clairefontaine
- 2004–2006: Paris Saint-Germain
- 2006–2007: Rennes

Senior career*
Years	Team	Apps	(Gls)
2007–2013	Rennes	39	(6)
2009–2010	→ Clermont (loan)	32	(8)
2012–2013	→ Granada (loan)	27	(0)
2013–2014	Granada	35	(3)
2014–2019	Porto	148	(39)
2019–2022	Al-Rayyan	56	(25)
2022–	Al-Gharafa	71	(40)

International career^{‡}
2006	France U16	7	(2)
2006	France U17	3	(0)
2007–2008	France U18	5	(1)
2008–2009	France U19	11	(7)
2010	France U20	5	(1)
2010–2012	France U21	8	(1)
2021–2025	Algeria A'	6	(3)
2013–2025	Algeria	72	(15)
Medal record
Men's football
Representing Algeria
FIFA Arab Cup
Winner	2021 Qatar
Africa Cup of Nations
Winner	2019 Egypt
- * Club domestic league appearances and goals as of 17 January 2026 ‡ National team caps and goals as of 9 December 2025

Yacine Nasreddine Brahimi (Arabic: يَاسِين نَصْر الدِّين إِبْرَاهِيمِيّ; born 8 February 1990) is a professional footballer who plays for Al-Gharafa. Born in France, he played for the Algeria national team as an attacking midfielder and a winger and is described as "technically gifted".

Brahimi began his career with various clubs in the Île-de-France region, having trained at ASB Montreuil and CO Vincennois. In 2003, he was selected to attend the Clairefontaine academy. Brahimi spent three years at the academy and, upon leaving, signed with Rennes. While in the club's youth academy, he achieved several club honours. After turning professional, Brahimi was loaned out to second division club Clermont Foot. While at Clermont, he had a successful individual 2009–10 season. After spending the previous season there on loan, he moved to the La Liga club Granada CF in 2013, and then to Porto for €6.5 million one year later.

An Algerian international, Brahimi is a former France youth international having represented the country at all youth levels. In 2009, he played on the under-19 team that reached the semi-finals at the 2009 UEFA European Under-19 Championship. In February 2013, Brahimi switched his international allegiance to Algeria and made his debut for them a month later, also playing at the 2014 FIFA World Cup and the 2015, 2017, 2019 and 2021 Africa Cup of Nations, winning the 2019 tournament.

== Club career ==
=== Early career ===
Brahimi was born in Paris to Algerian parents and grew up in the eastern suburbs of Paris in Montreuil in Seine-Saint-Denis. While growing up, he often emulated Zinedine Zidane while playing street football with friends. Brahimi began his football career playing for his local club ASB Montreuil. After a four-year stint there, he joined CO Vincennois, known for producing Ligue 1 player Blaise Matuidi, in nearby Vincennes. Two years later, Brahimi was selected to attend the renowned Clairefontaine academy in 2003 in order to further his development. While training at Clairefontaine during the week, he regularly played for Vincennois on the weekends. In his final year at Clairefontaine, Brahimi spent a year at the Camp des Loges, the youth training centre of Paris Saint-Germain, training alongside youth international teammate Mamadou Sakho. Despite being courted by several French and European clubs, following his stint at Clairefontaine, he signed an aspirant (youth) contract with Rennes. In October 2010, Brahimi cited choosing Rennes as his destination because of the club's educational value, stating, "In Rennes, the academy gives much importance to the schoolwork", and, "It was a warranty for my parents. They advised me to choose Stade Rennes. That way, I could continue my football training while preparing my Baccalauréat."

=== Rennes ===
Brahimi joined Rennes and quickly became a part of a slew of talent in the club's youth academy. He joined Damien Le Tallec (the younger brother of Anthony Le Tallec), Yann M'Vila, Yohann Lasimant, Kévin Théophile-Catherine and Samuel Souprayen as the club's most sought after prospects. The combination of M'Vila, Brahimi, Camara and Le Tallec (all four being members of the class of 1990) were particularly instrumental in their youth team's successes. With the under-16 team, the foursome won the Tournoi Carisport, a national tournament that regularly pits the top academies in France against each other. Two seasons later with the under-18 team, Brahimi won the under-18 league championship for the 2006–07 season. In 2008, the youth academy achieved its biggest honour after winning the Coupe Gambardella. The title was Rennes' third Gambardella Cup and its first since 2003 when the likes of Yoann Gourcuff and Sylvain Marveaux were playing in the competition. Following the 2007–08 season, on 23 June, Brahimi signed his first professional contract agreeing to a three-year deal until June 2011. Though on a professional contract, Brahimi was not assigned a number on the senior team and instead played on the club's Championnat de France amateur team in the fourth division appearing in 22 matches and scoring three goals helping the side finish 1st among professional clubs in their group, thus qualifying for the competition's playoffs, where they lost to Lyon in the semi-finals.

==== Clermont (loan) ====
Following a successful international season with France, Rennes decided it would be best to send the young player on loan to receive some much needed playing time. On 3 July 2009, the club announced that Brahimi would join Ligue 2 club Clermont Foot on loan for the entire 2009–10 season. Brahimi arrived at the club following the 2009 UEFA European Under-19 Football Championship, alongside fellow loanee from Juventus Carlo Vecchione, and was assigned the number 28 shirt. He made his professional debut on the opening match day of the season appearing as a substitute in a 2–1 defeat to Arles-Avignon. He scored his first goal for the club on 25 September converting a penalty in the club's 3–2 win over Angers. Brahimi's first goal in open play occurred on 4 December in Clermont's 3–1 win away to Bastia. Two weeks later, he scored again, converting another penalty in a 1–1 draw with Guingamp.

On 23 March 2010, Brahimi scored the opening goal in Clermont's 3–0 win over Ajaccio. Three days later, he scored a goal and provided an assist in a 3–1 away victory over Istres. A month later, Brahimi converted his third penalty of the season in a 3–2 victory over Dijon. The win moved Clermont up to 4th position in the league standings and just three points off a promotion place. The following week, Brahimi continued to display his offensive prowess scoring against Le Havre. However, the match ended in a 2–1 defeat for Clermont. It was the club's first defeat in a match where Brahimi had scored a goal. Three days later, Brahimi scored his eight goal of the campaign in a 3–1 victory against Guingamp. The victory established a promotion playoff match on the final match day of the season as fourth-placed Clermont faced third-placed Arles-Avignon with the victory earning promotion to Ligue 1. Unfortunately for Clermont, the club failed to earn promotion to Ligue 1 for the first time in club history as it lost the match 1–0. Brahimi played 89 minutes in the match receiving a yellow card in the process.

=== Return to Rennes ===
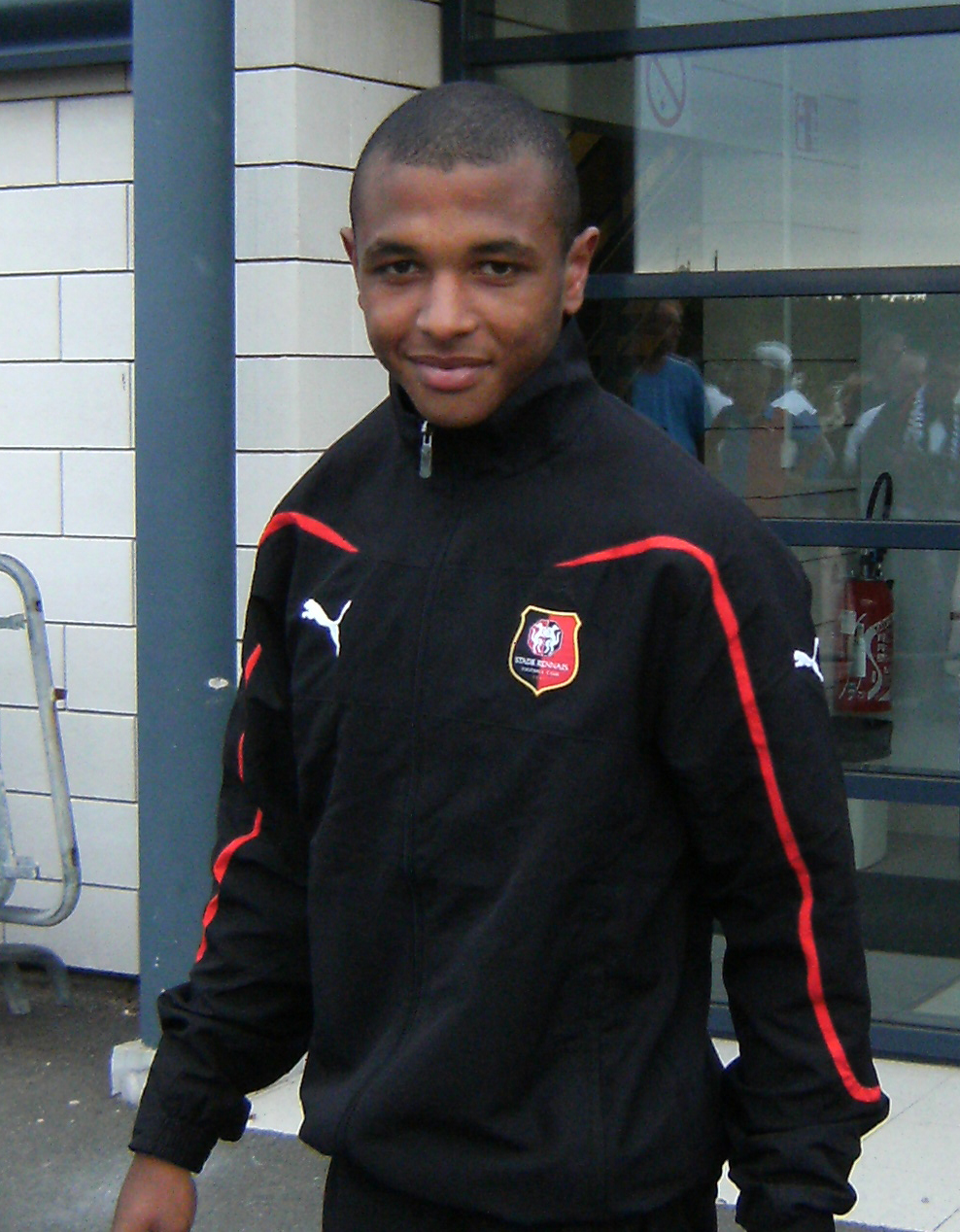
Brahimi after a match against SM Caen in July 2010

Following the season, on 15 May 2010, Rennes manager Frédéric Antonetti confirmed that Brahimi would return to the team, despite interest from Arsenal and Real Madrid, and that he would be heavily relied upon for the 2010–11 season possibly serving as the playmaker replacing the aging Jérôme Leroy. On 7 August 2010, Brahimi made his club debut for Rennes in the club's opening league match against Lille. He started the match and played 71 minutes in a 1–1 draw. The following day, Rennes announced that Brahimi had signed a four-year contract extension with the club. The new deal was to keep him at the club until June 2014.

On 14 August 2010, Brahimi scored his first career goal for the club in a 3–0 victory over Nancy. For a portion of the fall season, the play-maker underwent a dry spell not scoring a goal or providing an assist. As a result, Brahimi began rotating in and out of the starting lineup. After the winter break, Brahimi returned to form scoring and providing an assist in the team's 7–0 hammering of Championnat National club Cannes in the Coupe de France. One week later, he scored a double in a 4–0 league win over Arles-Avignon. On 5 February 2011, Brahimi scored a goal against his former youth club Paris Saint-Germain. The long-range driven goal was the only goal of the match as the victory moved Rennes equal on points with PSG for second place.

=== Granada ===
On 30 August 2012, Brahimi signed on loan for Granada CF of the Spanish La Liga for €700,000, with the option to sign for €4 million afterwards. This option was taken on 4 June 2013, when he signed a four-year deal at the club. At the LFP Awards, he was voted the best African player of the 2013–14 season.

=== Porto ===
On 22 July 2014, FC Porto announced the signing of Brahimi from Granada for a €6.5 million transfer fee and on a five-year contract. On 24 July 2014 Porto sold 80% of his economic rights to Doyen Sports for €5 million. The deals effectively made Porto acquired 20% economic rights of the player for €1.5 million.

Brahimi's first goal for the club came in the second leg of their UEFA Champions League play-off against Lille, scoring directly from a free-kick as Porto advanced to the group stage with a 3–0 aggregate victory. He scored his first hat-trick for the club in Porto's first match of the Champions League group stage, a 6–0 home win over BATE Borisov on 17 September. In their next European fixture, he had his penalty saved by goalkeeper Andriy Pyatov with the game goalless at Shakhtar Donetsk. He scored his first league goal against C.D. Nacional in a 2–0 win on 1 November. On 5 November, Brahimi scored one goal and assisted another as Porto defeated Athletic Bilbao 2–0 to secure qualification to the knockout stage of the Champions League.

On 26 June 2015, Porto bought back 30% economic rights from Doyen for €3.8 million.

Brahimi scored one goal as Porto defeated Maccabi Tel Aviv 2–0 in the group stage of the 2015–16 UEFA Champions League.

He left Porto upon the expiration of his contract on 30 June 2019.

=== Al-Rayyan ===
On 22 July 2019, Brahimi joined Qatar Stars League side Al-Rayyan. In his first season, he scored 15 goals and assisted 5 times in 22 appearances in league. The club finished second without to win any trophies, also the team was eliminated in the AFC Champions League playoff round.

=== Al-Gharafa ===
On 1 July 2022, Brahimi joined Al-Gharafa on a free transfer following his contract expiry. In his final two seasons at the club, he won back-to-back Qatari Cups during 4 years of excellent form, as Brahimi managed 83 goal contributions in just 89 games in the Qatar Stars League Brahimi was released by the club in 2026 following the expiry of his contract.

== International career ==
=== France ===
As early as age 13, Brahimi began featuring with regional youth teams playing for Île-de-France alongside future youth international teammates Mamadou Sakho, Tripy Makonda, Maxime Partouche and Sébastien Corchia. Brahimi made his debut for the under-16 team on 21 March 2006 converting a penalty in a 3–1 victory over Germany. He played with the under-16 team at the 2006 edition of the Montaigu Tournament playing in all four matches the team contested as France were crowned champions defeating Italy 2–1 in the final. With the under-17 team, Brahimi made his debut on 25 September in a qualification match for the 2007 UEFA European Under-17 Championship against Lithuania. France won the match 4–2 with Brahimi making a substitute appearance. Despite appearing in the first round of qualification, Brahimi was absent from the tournament itself, due to the player struggling to adapt at his new club domestically. He later failed to make the team that qualified for the 2007 FIFA U-17 World Cup, which was achieved by virtue of their semi-final appearance in the UEFA-sanctioned tournament. Brahimi made his debut with the under-18 team on 18 December 2007 in a friendly match against Portugal in a 1–0 loss and later featured in two friendly matches against Germany, one of which was played at the GAZi-Stadion auf der Waldau in Stuttgart.

With the under-19 team, Brahimi appeared in all 19 matches scoring 12 goals. He was immense during the 2009 UEFA European Under-19 Championship qualification scoring a team-leading five goals against Liechtenstein, Malta and the Republic of Ireland, scoring two goals each against the Liechtenstein and the hosts. Brahimi also scored several goals in friendly matches. On 30 March 2009, he scored a goal against Ukraine and, the following month, scored a brace against Finland in a 7–0 rout. At the 2009 UEFA European Under-19 Championship, Brahimi scored two goals, one against Serbia and another against Spain. The match-winning goal against Spain assured France's progression to the semi-finals, where they lost to England.

Following a successful season with Clermont, he was contacted by the Algerian Football Federation, which offered the player an opportunity to play on the team at the 2010 FIFA World Cup. Brahimi was set to be named to manager Rabah Saadane's preliminary squad list for the competition, but turned down the opportunity with his preference being to continue his international career with France. On 12 May 2010, after almost a year not representing France internationally, Brahimi was called up to the under-20 team by coach Patrick Gonfalone to participate in the 2010 Toulon Tournament. In the team's second group stage match against Japan, Brahimi scored the final goal in the team's 4–1 victory. He played in all five of the team's matches as France finished in third place.

On 26 August 2010, Brahimi was called up to the under-21 team by coach Erick Mombaerts for the first time for 2011 UEFA European Under-21 Championship qualification matches against Ukraine and Malta. He made his under-21 debut in the match against Malta. Brahimi played the entire match in a 2–0 victory. He subsequently featured in the team's three matches before dropping out of the selection for the team's friendly match against Slovakia in February 2011 due to injury.

=== Algeria ===
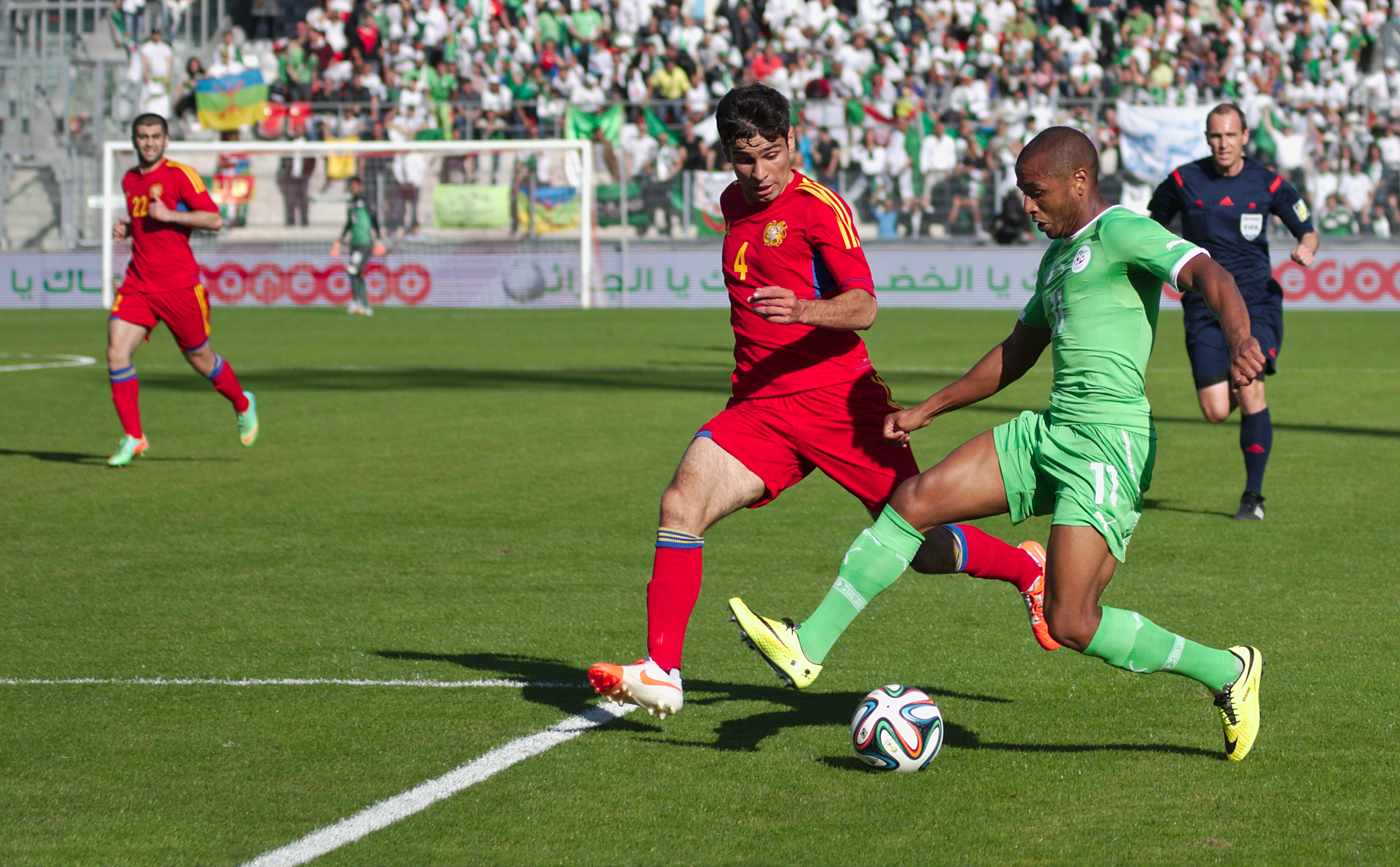
Brahimi in a May 2014 friendly, attacking against Taron Voskanyan of Armenia

In February 2013, it was announced Brahimi had decided to switch his FIFA national allegiance to represent Algeria. He made his debut a month later as a starter in the 3–1 win over Benin in the 2014 FIFA World Cup qualifiers.

On 22 June 2014, Brahimi scored his first international goal, the fourth for Algeria as they won 4–2 against South Korea in the group stage of the 2014 World Cup. He started all of Algeria's group matches, and was a substitute in the round of 16 as they lost in extra time to eventual champions Germany.

Brahimi was also in Algeria's squad for the 2015 Africa Cup of Nations. In their first group match, against South Africa, his cross was headed-in for an equaliser as an own goal for Thulani Hlatshwayo as Algeria came from behind to win 3–1. In their next match, he was chosen as Man of the Match, although the team lost 1–0 to Ghana. Brahimi featured in their next two matches as well, ending with defeat in the quarter-finals against eventual champions Ivory Coast.

== Style of play ==
Described as "technically gifted player", Brahimi is known for his great dribbling abilities and ability to take on players. Described by many coaches and journalists as a "Versatile winger that is unpredictable," Brahimi has earned himself the name as a great dribbler and a winger with pace and skill, earning himself the 2014 BBC African player of the year.

== Personal life ==
Brahimi is a practicing Muslim.

== Career statistics ==
=== Club ===
As of match played 12 January 2025

Appearances and goals by club, season and competition
Club	Season	League			National cup (Note: Includes Coupe de France, Copa del Rey, Taça de Portugal and Emir of Qatar Cup)		League cup (Note: Includes Coupe de la Ligue, Taça da Liga and Qatari Stars Cup)		Continental		Other		Total	
Club	Season	Division	Apps	Goals	Apps	Goals	Apps	Goals	Apps	Goals	Apps	Goals	Apps	Goals
Clermont	2009–10	Ligue 2	32	8	0	0	2	0	—		—		34	8
Rennes	2010–11	Ligue 1	22	4	2	2	1	0	—		—		25	6
Rennes	2011–12	Ligue 1	17	2	5	1	1	0	5 (Note: Appearances in UEFA Europa League)	0	—		28	3
Rennes	Total		39	6	7	3	2	0	5	0	—		53	9
Granada	2012–13	La Liga	27	0	1	0	—		—		—		28	0
Granada	2013–14	La Liga	35	3	1	0	—		—		—		36	3
Granada	Total		62	3	2	0	—		—		—		64	3
Porto	2014–15	Primeira Liga	28	7	1	0	2	0	11 (Note: Appearances in UEFA Champions League)	6	—		42	13
Porto	2015–16	Primeira Liga	33	7	4	1	0	0	7 (Note: Five appearances and one goal in UEFA Champions League, two appearances in UEFA Europa League)	1	—		44	9
Porto	2016–17	Primeira Liga	22	6	3	0	1	0	5	1	—		31	7
Porto	2017–18	Primeira Liga	33	9	5	1	4	1	7	1	—		49	12
Porto	2018–19	Primeira Liga	32	10	3	1	4	1	9	0	1 (Note: Appearance in Supertaça Cândido de Oliveira)	1	49	13
Porto	Total		148	39	16	3	11	2	39	9	1	1	215	54
Al-Rayyan	2019–20	Qatar Stars League	22	15	0	0	2	0	1 (Note: Appearance(s) in AFC Champions League)	0	1 (Note: Appearance in Qatar Cup)	0	26	15
Al-Rayyan	2020–21	Qatar Stars League	18	5	3	2	3	2	6	0	1	0	31	9
Al-Rayyan	2021–22	Qatar Stars League	16	5	2	0	5	2	6	2	—		19	6
Al-Rayyan	Total		56	25	5	2	10	4	13	2	2	0	86	33
Al-Gharafa	2022–23	Qatar Stars League	17	7	2	2	3	1	—		—		22	10
Al-Gharafa	2023–24	Qatar Stars League	21	21	3	3	3	0	—		—		27	24
Al-Gharafa	2024–25	Qatar Stars League	8	4	0	0	1	0	5	1	—		14	5
Al-Gharafa	Total		46	32	5	5	7	1	5	1	—		63	39
Career total			386	116	32	10	32	7	62	12	3	1	516	144

=== International ===
As of match played 26 March 2024

Appearances and goals by national team and year
National team	Year	Apps	Goals
Algeria	2013	4	0
Algeria	2014	11	4
Algeria	2015	11	2
Algeria	2016	5	1
Algeria	2017	9	4
Algeria	2018	5	0
Algeria	2019	7	0
Algeria	2020	4	0
Algeria	2021	6	3
Algeria	2022	4	0
Algeria	2023	0	0
Algeria	2024	2	1
Total		68	15

Scores and results list Algeria's goal tally first, score column indicates score after each Brahimi goal.

List of international goals scored by Yacine Brahimi
No.	Date	Venue	Opponent	Score	Result	Competition
1	22 June 2014	Estádio Beira-Rio, Porto Alegre, Brazil	South Korea	4–1	4–2	2014 FIFA World Cup
2	6 September 2014	Addis Ababa Stadium, Addis Ababa, Ethiopia	Ethiopia	2–0	2–1	2015 Africa Cup of Nations qualification
3	15 October 2014	Stade Mustapha Tchaker, Blida, Algeria	Malawi	1–0	3–0	2015 Africa Cup of Nations qualification
4	15 November 2014	Stade Mustapha Tchaker, Blida, Algeria	Ethiopia	3–1	3–1	2015 Africa Cup of Nations qualification
5	13 October 2015	Stade du 5 Juillet, Algiers, Algeria	Senegal	1–0	1–0	Friendly
6	17 November 2015	Stade Mustapha Tchaker, Blida, Algeria	Tanzania	1–0	7–0	2018 FIFA World Cup qualification
7	25 March 2016	Stade Mustapha Tchaker, Blida, Algeria	Ethiopia	4–0	7–1	2017 Africa Cup of Nations qualification
8	2 September 2017	National Heroes Stadium, Lusaka, Zambia	Zambia	1–2	1–3	2018 FIFA World Cup qualification
9	10 November 2017	Stade Mohamed Hamlaoui, Constantine, Algeria	Nigeria	1–1	1–1	2018 FIFA World Cup qualification
10	14 November 2017	Stade du 5 Juillet, Algiers, Algeria	Central African Republic	1–0	3–0	Friendly
11	14 November 2017	Stade du 5 Juillet, Algiers, Algeria	Central African Republic	2–0	3–0	Friendly
12	4 December 2021	Al Janoub Stadium, Al Wakrah, Qatar	Lebanon	1–0	2–0	2021 FIFA Arab Cup
13	11 December 2021	Al Thumama Stadium, Doha, Qatar	Morocco	1–0	2–2	2021 FIFA Arab Cup
14	18 December 2021	Al Bayt Stadium, Al Khor, Qatar	Tunisia	2–0	2–0	2021 FIFA Arab Cup final
15	26 March 2024	Nelson Mandela Stadium, Algiers, Algeria	South Africa	2–2	3–3	2024 FIFA Series

== Honours ==
Porto

- Primeira Liga: 2017–18
- Supertaça Cândido de Oliveira: 2018

Al Gharafa

- Amir of Qatar Cup: 2025

Algeria

- Africa Cup of Nations: 2019
- FIFA Arab Cup: 2021

Individual

- El Heddaf Arab Footballer of the Year: 2014
- BBC African Footballer of the Year: 2014
- CAF Most Promising Talent of the Year: 2014
- CAF Team of the Year: 2014, 2015
- Algerian Footballer of the Year : 2014
- Algerian Olympic and Sports Awards Best Algerian Athlete of the Year: 2014
- Primeira Liga Goal of the Month: October/November 2015 (vs. C.D. Tondela), October 2016 (vs. F.C. Arouca), January 2018 (vs. Vitória de Guimarães)
- Porto Player of the Year: 2017
- FPF "Quinas de Ouro" Primeira Liga Team of the Year: 2017
- SJPF Primeira Liga Team of the Year: 2017
- Qatar Stars League Team of the Year: 2019–20, 2023–24
- Qatar Stars League Top Scorer: 2019–20
- Qatar Stars League Top assists provider: 2022–23
- FIFA Arab Cup Golden Ball: 2021
- FIFA Arab Cup Silver Boot: 2021
- FIFA Arab Cup Team of the Tournament: 2021
