= Mamadou Sakho =

French footballer (born 1990)

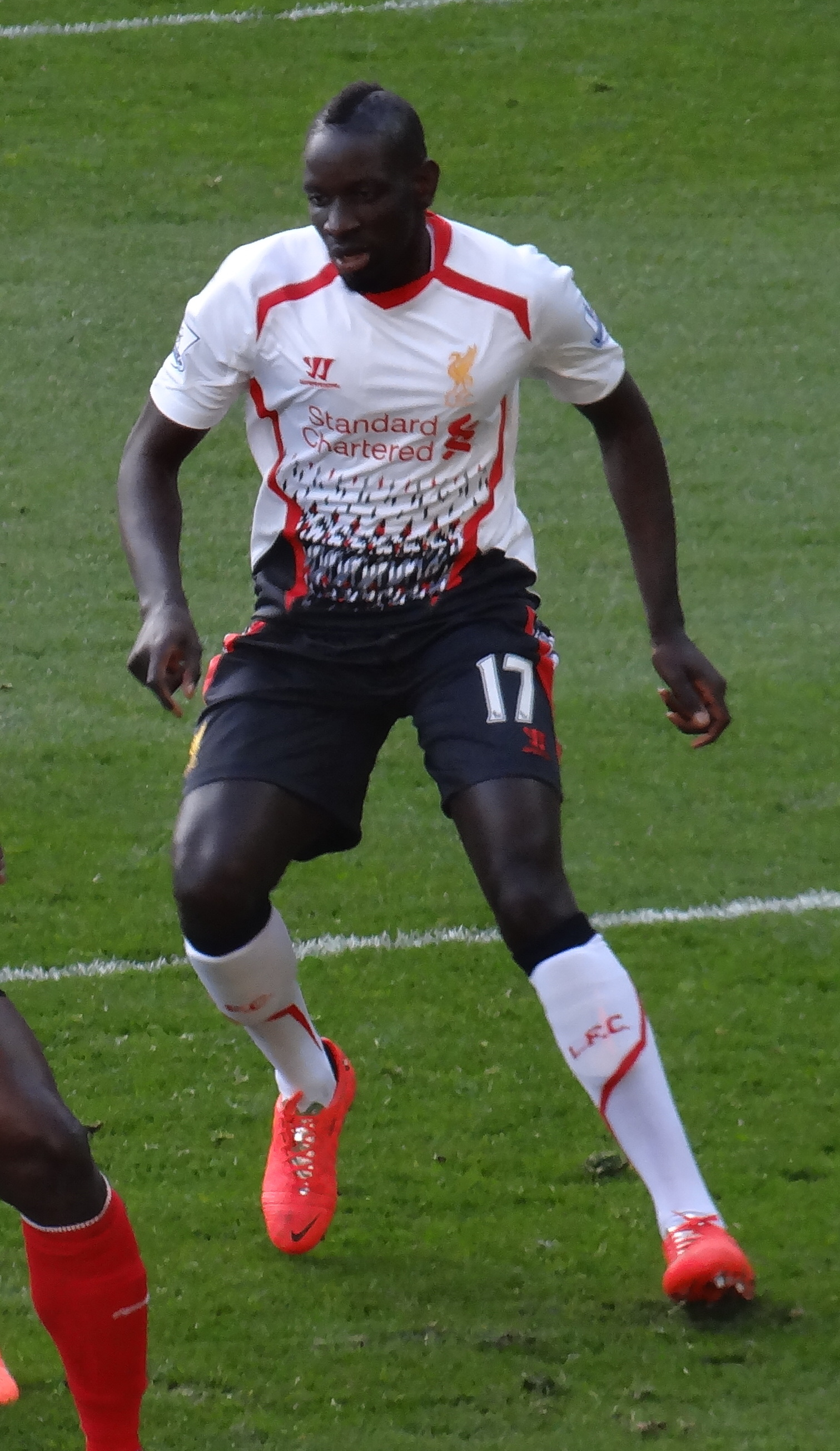
- Sakho playing for Liverpool in 2014

Personal information
- Full name: Mamadou Sakho
- Date of birth: 13 February 1990 (age 36)
- Place of birth: Paris, France
- Height: 1.87 m (6 ft 2 in)
- Position: Centre-back

Youth career
- 1996–2002: Paris FC
- 2002–2007: Paris Saint-Germain

Senior career*
Years	Team	Apps	(Gls)
2007–2013	Paris Saint-Germain	151	(7)
2013–2017	Liverpool	56	(2)
2017	→ Crystal Palace (loan)	8	(0)
2017–2021	Crystal Palace	64	(1)
2021–2023	Montpellier	45	(1)
2024–2025	Torpedo Kutaisi	17	(0)
Total		341	(11)

International career
2005–2006	France U16	7	(1)
2006–2007	France U17	5	(0)
2007–2008	France U18	3	(0)
2008–2009	France U19	4	(0)
2008–2010	France U21	15	(1)
2010–2018	France	29	(2)
- * Club domestic league appearances and goals

Mamadou Sakho (born 13 February 1990) is a French former professional footballer who played as a centre-back.

Sakho began his career at Paris FC before moving to Paris Saint-Germain's youth system in 2002. In October 2007, on his league debut, he became the youngest player ever to captain a Ligue 1 club. Sakho made over 200 appearances for the club, winning all four domestic trophies. In 2013, he transferred to Liverpool for £18 million. He had a loan spell with Crystal Palace in 2017, and was subsequently bought by the team for £26 million in September 2017. In July 2021, he joined Montpellier on a free transfer; he left the club in November 2023, following a physical altercation with manager Michel Der Zakarian. In the final year of his career, he represented Georgian club Torpedo Kutaisi.

Sakho was a full France international, who previously earned caps and captained the nation at all youth levels. After making his senior debut in 2010 against England, Sakho earned 29 caps and represented France at the 2014 FIFA World Cup.

== Early life ==
Sakho was born in Paris to Diakhanké Senegalese parents and was the fourth child of a family of seven children. He was raised in the northern neighborhood of Goutte d'Or.

== Club career ==
=== Early career ===
Sakho started his football career at the age of six playing for the juniors of hometown club Paris FC. In 2002, he was lured away to professional club Paris Saint-Germain. Sakho was originally a striker, but due to Paris Saint-Germain's youth team having fewer defenders than strikers, he was moved into a more defensive role.

Sakho struggled to adapt during his first year at the Camp des Loges, the headquarters of the club's youth academy, often refusing to accept orders handed out by the trainers, such as when to go to bed. At one point, he was threatened with expulsion from the club due to his constant bad behavior. Following guidance from his parents and, particularly, under-13 Paris Saint-Germain coach Christian Mas, Sakho curbed his bad behavior and began to focus on his studies and football. When Sakho was 14, his father suddenly died. The resulting pain led to Sakho considering leaving football, but he later described that idea as "useless" and returned to the club after bereavement. Sakho quickly became one of the club's most sought after prospects winning numerous MVP awards during his time in the youth academy. In April 2005, he was a part of the Île-de-France region team that won the 2004–05 Coupe Nationale. That same year, he was a part of the Paris Saint-Germain under-18 team that won the Championnat National des 18 ans league title, despite being three years younger than many of his teammates.

In total, Sakho spent nearly six years at the Camp des Loges. A day after his 17th birthday, manager Paul Le Guen called the youngster up for the club's UEFA Cup Round of 32 first leg match against AEK Athens on 14 February 2007. Sakho started the match picking up a yellow card in the 20th minute. He played 85 minutes before being substituted out as Paris Saint-Germain won the match 2–0. Sakho played his second and final match of the season in the UEFA Cup Round of 16 first leg match against Benfica, he played the full match in a 2–1 victory.

=== Paris Saint-Germain ===
==== 2007–2010 ====
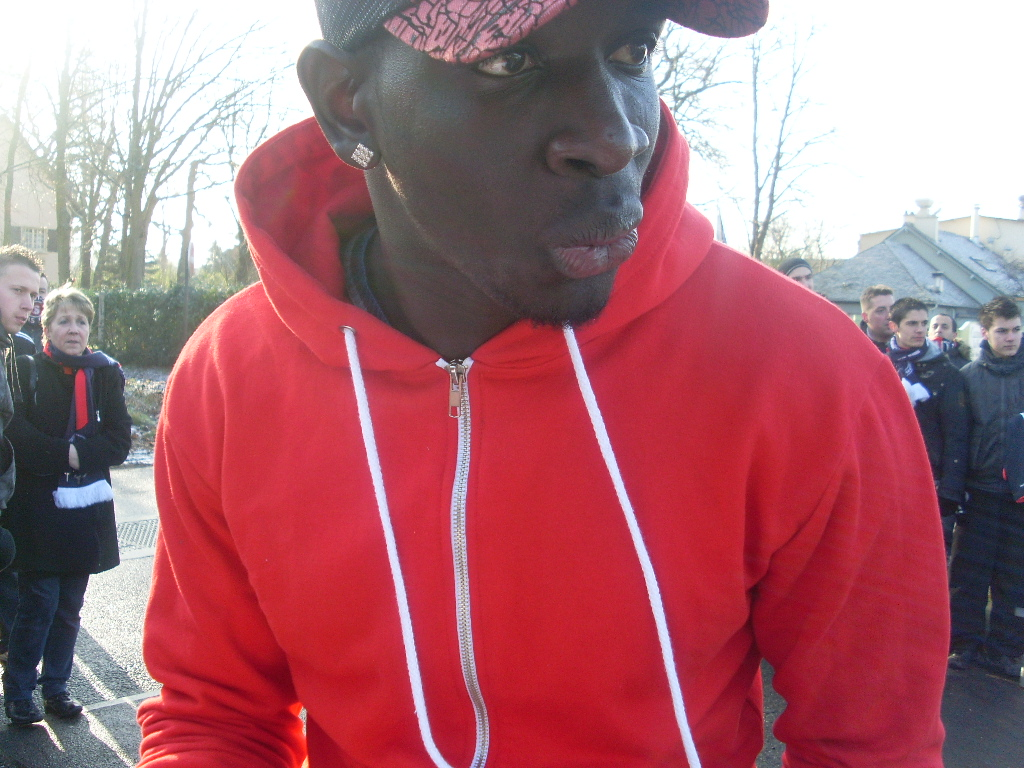
Sakho in 2009

On 14 June 2007, Sakho signed his first professional contract agreeing to a three-year deal. He was officially promoted to the senior side for the 2007–08 season, despite being only 17 years old, and was assigned the first team number 3 shirt. Sakho made his first start that season for Paris Saint-Germain in the club's 3–0 win over Lorient in the Coupe de la Ligue on 26 September 2007, starting in the centre back role alongside the experienced Colombian Mario Yepes. Sakho made his league debut on 20 October against Valenciennes in a 0–0 draw. In an effort to galvanize the questionable leadership of several senior team players, such as first-team captain Pauleta and vice-captain Sylvain Armand, Le Guen named Sakho captain for the match. Sakho's role as captain made him the youngest-ever captain of Paris Saint-Germain at the age of 17 years and 8 months and also the youngest player to ever captain a side in Ligue 1. In the following match against Lyon, he was named captain again and tasked with the role of containing fellow French starlet Hatem Ben Arfa. Despite Sakho and the club putting up a strong fight, Ben Arfa scored two goals in a span of three minutes as Les Parisiens suffered a 3–2 defeat. In the club's following match against Nancy, Sakho picked up an extensive injury, which ruled him out for two months. He returned to action on 23 February 2008, playing the entire match in a 1–1 draw against Monaco. On 29 March, Sakho started and played the full 90 minutes in the club's 2–1 victory over Lens in the 2008 Coupe de la Ligue Final. The victory awarded Sakho the first major trophy of his career. In total, Sakho made 16 appearances during that season.

In the following season, Sakho made 34 total appearances contributing to PSG's successful run where the club reached as high as 2nd in the league, reached the semi-finals of the Coupe de France, and made it to the UEFA Cup quarter-finals. On 30 January 2009, due to his positive play and clubs from abroad constantly inquiring for his services, Paris Saint-Germain awarded Sakho a contract extension until June 2012. Two weeks later, he scored his first career goal for the club in a league match against Saint-Étienne on 14 February 2009, a day after his 19th birthday. The goal gave Paris Saint-Germain a 1–0 lead and the club went on to win the match 2–1.

Sakho opened the 2009–10 season as the incumbent starter partnering either veterans Sammy Traoré or Zoumana Camara in defense. Midway through the season, Sakho was embroiled in controversy when he allegedly slapped a Le Parisien newspaper journalist at the Camp des Loges, the club's training center. Before the incident, Sakho had allegedly confronted the journalist to question the accuracy of an article he had written referring to the controversy surrounding why Sakho went to a nightclub following Paris Saint-Germain's embarrassing loss to Lorient hours earlier. Sakho reportedly insulted the journalist and then slapped him before walking away. The journalist, who preferred to remain anonymous, filed a complaint the following day with both he and the newspaper describing Sakho's attitude as "unprofessional". Paris Saint-Germain president Robin Leproux and manager Antoine Kombouaré issued an apology on the club's behalf and Sakho later apologized to the journalist by telephone.

==== 2010–2013 ====
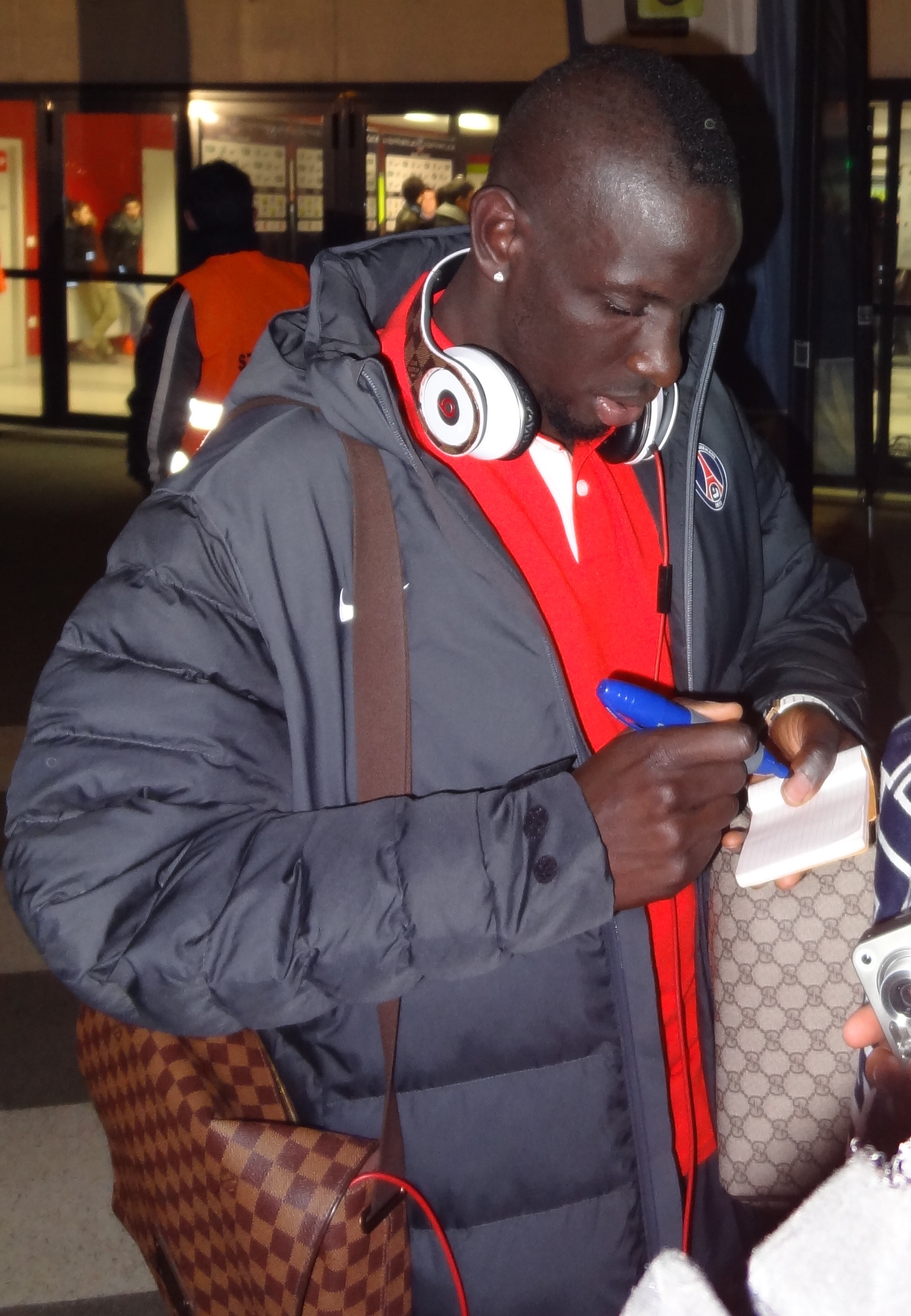
Sakho signing autographs in 2013

Sakho started the 2010–11 campaign partnering with Camara in defense. He was also installed as the team's captain in the UEFA Europa League by manager Kombouaré due to the unavailability of Claude Makélélé. Midway through August, Sakho began appearing in the centre back position alongside veteran Sylvain Armand. He scored his first goal of the season on 11 September 2010 in a 4–0 victory over Arles-Avignon. In Europe, Sakho captained the team in their 5–4 aggregate victory over Israeli club Maccabi Tel Aviv in the Europa League playoff round. He accomplished this feat again in the group stage leading the team to a 2–0 victory over Ukrainian club Karpaty Lviv. On 16 October, Sakho scored the game-winning goal in a 2–0 victory over Toulouse. In the team's first match following the winter break, he scored his third goal of the campaign in Paris Saint-Germain's victory over Sochaux. After a prolonged period of negotiations, on 8 March 2011, Sakho signed a two-year contract extension with the club until June 2014. On 20 April, he captained the team to a 3–1 victory over Angers in the semi-finals of the Coupe de France. The victory inserted the club into the 2011 Coupe de France Final; the club's second consecutive appearance in the competition's final match. Paris Saint-Germain lost the match 1–0 to Lille. On 10 May, Sakho was nominated for the National Union of Professional Footballers (UNFP) Young Player of the Year award. Two weeks later, he won the honour. Sakho was also named to the organization's Team of the Year alongside club teammate Nenê.

Sakho began the 2011–12 season as the club's first-choice captain under Kombouaré. On 13 August 2011, in the club's second league match of the season, he suffered a hamstring injury. Despite initially being ruled out for three weeks, Sakho missed two months and returned to the team in its 3–1 away win over Ajaccio. He remained a fixture in the team for the rest of the autumn campaign as PSG finished the first half of the league in first-place position. In January 2012, Kombouaré resigned from his position. He was replaced by Italian manager Carlo Ancelotti. Under the helm of Ancelotti, Sakho retained the captaincy and appeared as a starter through March. However, after unconvincing performances in draws with Lyon, Caen, and Bordeaux, which resulted in the club losing its grip on first place, the captain was benched by Ancelotti and stripped of the captaincy. Ancelotti based Sakho's benching on the increased competition in the squad as the Italian preferred the central duo of Milan Biševac and Alex. Sakho was also questioned by club director Leonardo for being "slightly overweight".

After making a cameo appearance in the Le Classique, Sakho made his second appearance since his benching on 29 April 2012 appearing as a first-half substitute for the injured Biševac against fellow title contenders Lille. In the second half, with Les Parisiens leading 1–0, Sakho conceded a penalty after fouling striker Nolan Roux. The foul also resulted in a red card. Lille converted the penalty and later went on to win the match 2–1.

On 26 May 2013, in PSG's final game of the season having already won the league, Sakho came on as an emergency goalkeeper for the final seven minutes against Lorient after substitute goalkeeper Ronan Le Crom had been sent off for fouling Julien Quercia to give away a penalty. Arnaud Le Lan converted the penalty, but PSG won 3–1.

=== Liverpool ===
==== 2013–2015 ====
On 2 September 2013, Premier League club Liverpool announced the signing of Sakho for a fee of £18 million. He made his debut on 16 September 2013 against Swansea City in a 2–2 draw at the Liberty Stadium. Liverpool manager Brendan Rodgers had described the Frenchman as "a beast in training" prior to his debut. On 7 December 2013, Sakho scored his first goal for Liverpool in a 4–1 win at Anfield against West Ham United. Intermittent injuries limited Sakho to just 19 appearances, however he played a key role in Liverpool's surprise title challenge where they eventually finished as runners-up in the Premier League.

On 27 September 2014, Sakho was left out of the squad for the Merseyside Derby clash against Everton. Upon hearing the manager's decision, he left the stadium. The Frenchman later apologised for his action. After a poor beginning to the season, manager Brendan Rodgers switched to a 3-man defensive line in October – with Sakho playing a crucial part. His pace, athleticism, and ball playing abilities were key in this formation. Sakho returned to the Liverpool team for a 2–2 draw with Arsenal on 22 December 2014 and went on to help the Reds to five clean sheets in eight Premier League matches.

==== 2015–2017 ====
Sakho began the season as backup to Dejan Lovren. On 17 September 2015, Sakho made his first start of the season; a man-of-the-match performance in a Europa League away match against Bordeaux, captaining the side in a 1–1 draw. A day later, it was announced that he had signed a new long-term contract with the club. Sakho was restored to the starting lineup and under new manager Jürgen Klopp was praised for his excellent form. On 8 November, however, he sustained a knee injury in a 2–1 defeat to Crystal Palace at Anfield that ruled him out for two months.

Sakho was praised in Liverpool's victory over Borussia Dortmund in the Europa League quarter-finals. He coped against in-form striker Pierre-Emerick Aubameyang in the 1–1 away draw in the first leg, and then scored a header as they mounted a late comeback to win the second 4–3.

On 18 July 2016, it was announced that Sakho would wear the number 3 jersey for the 2016–17 season, switching from the number 17 he had worn since he joined Liverpool. During Liverpool's pre-season tour of the United States, Sakho was sent home by manager Jürgen Klopp for not respecting the rules that had been put in place for the squad. Klopp revealed that Sakho had been late for the team's flight as well as for a subsequent medical treatment session and a team meal time. As a result, Sakho was demoted from the senior squad and thus only played competitive football with the reserves in the Professional Development League that season.

=== Crystal Palace ===
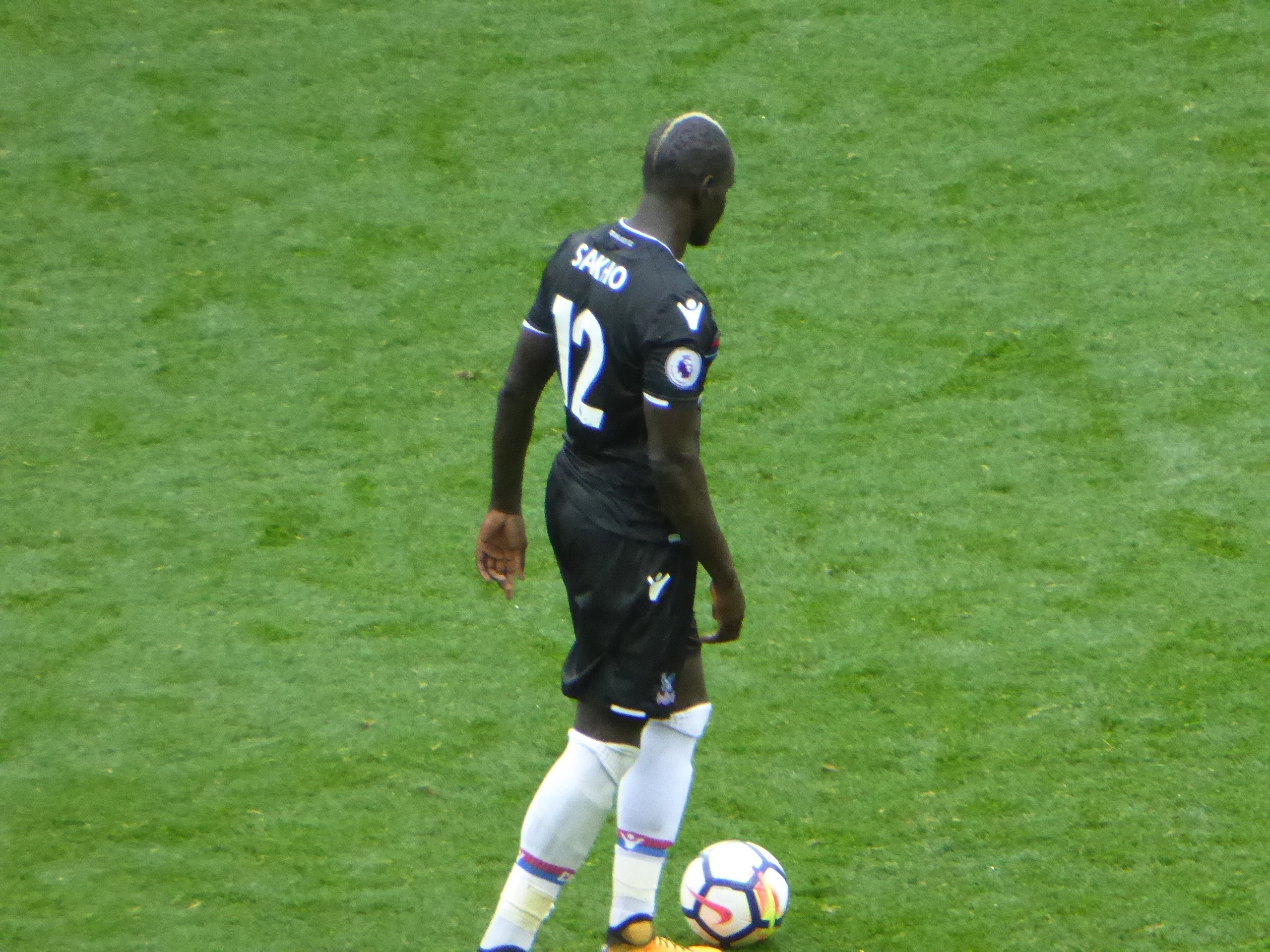
Sakho with Crystal Palace in 2017

On 31 January 2017, Sakho signed with Crystal Palace on loan until the end of the season. Sakho made his debut appearance in a 1–0 victory over Middlesbrough on 25 February, and was praised by manager Sam Allardyce for his role in Crystal Palace's victory. After Palace kept clean sheets in victories against West Bromwich Albion and Watford, Sakho was named a nominee for the Premier League Player of the Month award for March and was also awarded Crystal Palace's Player of the Month on 31 March. Sakho followed this up with well-received performances in Palace's 1–2 victory at Stamford Bridge over league leaders Chelsea and a 3–0 home win over Arsenal.

On 31 August 2017, Sakho signed for Crystal Palace on a four-year contract, with a transfer fee of £24 million plus £2 million in add-ons being agreed with Liverpool.

=== Montpellier ===
In July 2021, Sakho signed for Ligue 1 club Montpellier on a free transfer, after his Crystal Palace contract expired.

On 27 June 2022, Sakho changed his shirt number at Montpellier from 3 to 75, taking advantage of new rules on shirt numbers set forth by the Ligue de Football Professionnel (LFP). 75 is the department number of Paris, where Sakho was born.

On 24 October 2023, Sakho was involved in an altercation with manager Michel Der Zakarian, with the defender reportedly grabbing Der Zakarian by the collar before the manager fell to the floor; it is alleged that Sakho was provoked by Der Zakarian calling him a "cry-baby" over a training ground incident. On 2 November, Sakho announced his departure from the club.

=== Torpedo Kutaisi ===
On 11 June 2024, Georgian side Torpedo Kutaisi officially announced that they had reached an agreement for the signing of Sakho on a free transfer; as part of the deal, he would also serve in a managerial role within the club's youth academy.

=== Retirement ===
On 12 January 2026, at 35 years old, Sakho announced his retirement from professional football.

== International career ==
=== Youth ===
Sakho has been active with France at youth level. As early as the age of 13, he began featuring with regional youth sides playing for Île-de-France alongside fellow youth internationals Yacine Brahimi, Tripy Makonda, Maxime Partouche, and Sébastien Corchia. Sakho made his debut for the under-16 team on 21 March 2006 in a friendly match against Germany in a 3–1 victory. He scored his only goal for the team in their 1–0 victory over England in the Montaigu Tournament. France later won the competition defeating Italy 2–1 in the final. With the under-17 team, Sakho made his debut in the team's opening match against Cyprus in an international youth tournament. Midway through the season, Sakho was named captain by coach François Blaquart who noticed the player's leadership skills. Under Sakho's captaincy, the team reached the 2007 UEFA European Under-17 Championship and, later, the 2007 FIFA U-17 World Cup by virtue of their semi-final appearance in the UEFA-sanctioned tournament. At the U-17 World Cup, which was held in South Korea, Sakho captained the team to a quarter-final appearance where they lost to Spain in a penalty shoot-out.

Due his increased playing time with his parent club, Sakho only made four appearances with the under-18 team. He made his debut for the team on 18 December 2007 in a friendly match against Portugal and later featured in two friendly matches against Germany, one of which was played at the GAZi-Stadion auf der Waldau in Stuttgart. Similarly with the under-19 team, Sakho's play with the team was limited not only due to his playing time with Paris Saint-Germain, but also due to his commitments with the under-21 team. Despite making only four appearances with the team, he was selected to play in the 2009 UEFA European Under-19 Championship. Paris Saint-Germain, however, refused his participation in order to preserve the player's fitness with the player having already played in the 2009 Toulon Tournament, which was held the same month.

Sakho made his France U21 debut on 19 August 2008 in a friendly match against Slovakia. He played in the 2009 Toulon Tournament and captained the team on two occasions serving in place of the lead captain for the tournament, Étienne Capoue, who came off the bench. On 8 September 2009, Sakho scored his first under-21 goal in a 2011 UEFA European Under-21 Championship qualification match against Ukraine. The match ended in a 2–2 draw. A month later, he was installed as the first-choice captain of the team following the selection of former captain Moussa Sissoko to the senior team.

=== Senior ===
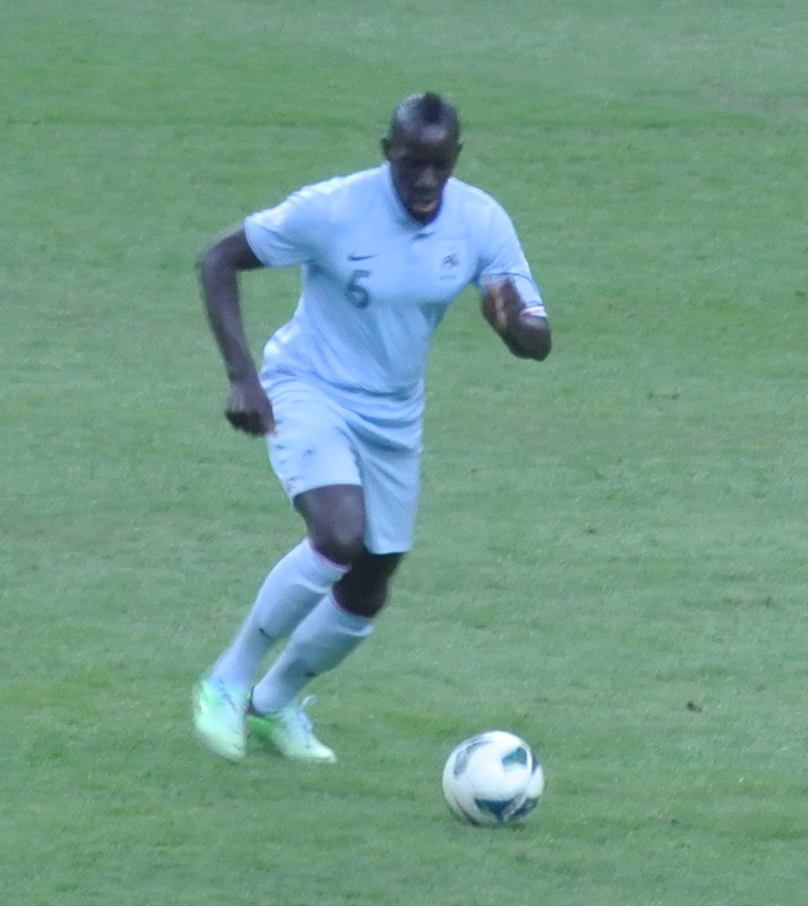
Sakho playing for France in 2013

On 5 August 2010, Sakho was called up to the France senior team for the first time by new manager Laurent Blanc for the team's friendly match against Norway on 11 August 2010. He didn't make his international debut in the match, but was subsequently called up by Blanc for national team matches in September and October 2010. On 17 November 2010, Sakho made his senior international debut against England in a 2–1 win at Wembley Stadium, appearing as a substitute at the start of the second half for Philippe Mexès.

On 19 November 2013, in the second leg of their 2014 World Cup qualifying play-off against Ukraine, Sakho scored his first and second international goals, giving Les Bleus a 3–2 aggregate win to qualify for the 2014 FIFA World Cup.

On 13 May 2014, Sakho was named in Didier Deschamps' squad for the 2014 FIFA World Cup. He made his FIFA World Cup debut in the team's opening match, keeping a clean sheet in partnership with Raphaël Varane in a 3–0 win over Honduras. In the second match, Les Bleus were again on course for a shutout with Sakho in defence, leading 3–0 against Switzerland when he was substituted with an injury in the 66th minute. The team eventually ran out 5–2 winners to qualify for the knockout stage. Sakho returned to the side for the next match, helping France to another clean sheet in a 0–0 draw with Ecuador.

On 17 May 2018, he was named on the preliminary list for the French squad for the 2018 FIFA World Cup. He ultimately did not make the final list.

== Style of play ==
In April 2016, Richard Innes of the Daily Mirror described Sakho as "a defensive maverick; a man who plays by his own rules", who practises an "often highly alternative approach" to defending. A tall and strong defender, in 2013, Steve Hunter highlighted that Sakho's main traits were his tackling ability, work-rate, and leadership, although he also singled out the centre-back for his "physical and tactical qualities." Despite not possessing a particularly good touch on the ball, which led him to be criticised both by pundits and his teams' fans on occasion, he was also a highly competent passer, with Jack Lusby of Bleacher Report describing him as "Liverpool's best and most effective ball-playing centre-back" in 2015. His ball-playing ability, combined with his pace and athleticism, enabled him to excel in a three–man back–line under his Liverpool manager Brendan Rodgers during the 2014–15 season.

== Doping suspension ==
On 23 April 2016, it was announced that Sakho was being investigated by UEFA for violating an anti-doping rule, after he was tested on 17 March following a Europa League game against Manchester United. The club, along with Sakho, agreed that while UEFA were investigating, he would not be available for team selection. Five days later UEFA punished him with a 30-day provisional suspension from all European football, which FIFA extended to cover all world football. On 28 May 2016, when the ban expired, UEFA's chairman of the control, ethics and disciplinary body decided not to extend it. On 8 July 2016, the case was dismissed by UEFA. The substance higenamine, found in weight-loss supplements, was not specifically on the World Anti-Doping Agency’s prohibited list. On 4 November 2020, Sakho won a financial settlement and apology from WADA for defamation and received substantial damages. Despite the agency not disclosing the amount, it was reported that Sakho sought a reported 16.7 million pounds ($21.7 million) in damages from WADA for its comments about the case.

== Personal life ==
In 2012, he married Moroccan fashion designer Majda, with whom he has three daughters, Aida, Sienna and Niya, born in 2013, 2015 and 2023, and a son, Tidiane, born in 2018.

As part of Liverpool's work in the community, Sakho helped teach French to local children when he played for them.

Sakho is a Muslim.

== Career statistics ==
=== Club ===
Appearances and goals by club, season and competition
Club	Season	League			National cup (Note: Includes Coupe de France, FA Cup)		League cup (Note: Includes Coupe de la Ligue, Football League/EFL Cup)		Europe		Other		Total	
Club	Season	Division	Apps	Goals	Apps	Goals	Apps	Goals	Apps	Goals	Apps	Goals	Apps	Goals
Paris Saint-Germain	2006–07	Ligue 1	0	0	0	0	0	0	2 (Note: Appearances in UEFA Cup)	0	0	0	2	0
Paris Saint-Germain	2007–08	Ligue 1	12	0	2	0	2	0	0	0	0	0	16	0
Paris Saint-Germain	2008–09	Ligue 1	23	1	1	0	3	0	7	0	0	0	34	1
Paris Saint-Germain	2009–10	Ligue 1	32	0	5	0	2	0	0	0	0	0	39	0
Paris Saint-Germain	2010–11	Ligue 1	35	4	4	0	1	0	9 (Note: Appearances in UEFA Europa League)	0	1 (Note: Appearance in Trophée des Champions)	0	46	4
Paris Saint-Germain	2011–12	Ligue 1	22	0	2	0	1	0	1	0	0	0	26	0
Paris Saint-Germain	2012–13	Ligue 1	27	2	3	0	1	0	3 (Note: Appearances in UEFA Champions League)	0	0	0	34	2
Paris Saint-Germain	Total		151	7	17	0	10	0	22	0	1	0	201	7
Liverpool	2013–14	Premier League	18	1	0	0	1	0	0	0	—		19	1
Liverpool	2014–15	Premier League	16	0	5	0	4	0	2 (Note: One appearance in UEFA Champions League, one appearance in UEFA Europa League)	0	—		27	0
Liverpool	2015–16	Premier League	22	1	0	0	2	0	10	1	—		34	2
Liverpool	Total		56	2	5	0	7	0	12	1	—		80	3
Crystal Palace (loan)	2016–17	Premier League	8	0	0	0	0	0	—		—		8	0
Crystal Palace	2017–18	Premier League	19	1	0	0	1	0	—		—		20	1
Crystal Palace	2018–19	Premier League	27	0	0	0	0	0	—		—		27	0
Crystal Palace	2019–20	Premier League	14	0	0	0	0	0	—		—		14	0
Crystal Palace	2020–21	Premier League	4	0	1	0	1	0	—		—		6	0
Crystal Palace	Crystal Palace total		72	1	1	0	2	0	—		—		75	1
Montpellier	2021–22	Ligue 1	29	0	3	0	—		—		—		32	0
Montpellier	2022–23	Ligue 1	15	1	1	0	—		—		—		16	1
Montpellier	2023–24	Ligue 1	1	0	0	0	—		—		—		1	0
Montpellier	Total		45	1	4	0	—		—		—		49	1
Torpedo Kutaisi	2024	Erovnuli Liga	11	0	—		—		2 (Note: Appearances in UEFA Conference League)	0	—		13	0
Torpedo Kutaisi	2025	Erovnuli Liga	6	0	0	0	—		—		—		6	0
Torpedo Kutaisi	Total		17	0	0	0	—		2	0	—		19	0
Career total			341	11	27	0	19	0	36	1	1	0	424	12

=== International ===
Appearances and goals by national team and year
National team	Year	Apps	Goals
France	2010	1	0
France	2011	4	0
France	2012	6	0
France	2013	5	2
France	2014	8	0
France	2015	3	0
France	2016	1	0
France	2017	0	0
France	2018	1	0
Total		29	2

Scores and results list France's goal tally first, score column indicates score after each Sakho goal

List of international goals scored by Mamadou Sakho
No.	Date	Venue	Cap	Opponent	Score	Result	Competition	Ref.
1	19 November 2013	Stade de France, Saint-Denis, France	16	Ukraine	1–0	3–0	2014 FIFA World Cup qualification	
2	19 November 2013	Stade de France, Saint-Denis, France	16	Ukraine	3–0	3–0	2014 FIFA World Cup qualification	

== Honours ==
Paris Saint-Germain

- Ligue 1: 2012–13
- Coupe de France: 2009–10
- Coupe de la Ligue: 2007–08
- Trophée des Champions: 2013

Liverpool

- Football League Cup runner-up: 2015–16
- UEFA Europa League runner-up: 2015–16

Torpedo Kutaisi

- Georgian Super Cup: 2024

Individual

- UNFP Ligue 1 Team of the Year: 2010–11
- UNFP Ligue 1 Young Player of the Year: 2010–11
