= Yannick Boli =

French footballer (born 1988)

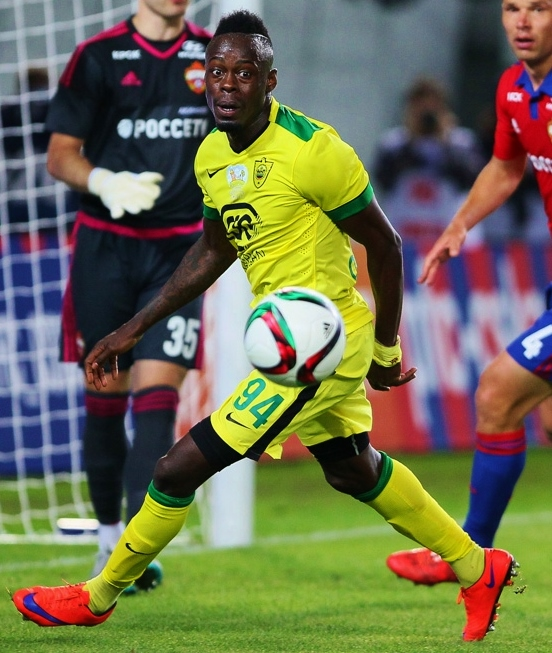
- Boli with Anzhi Makhachkala in 2015

Personal information
- Full name: Yannick Toapri Boli
- Date of birth: 13 January 1988 (age 38)
- Place of birth: Saint-Maur-des-Fossés, France
- Height: 1.81 m (5 ft 11 in)
- Position: Striker

Youth career
- 1999–2005: Paris Saint-Germain

Senior career*
Years	Team	Apps	(Gls)
2005–2007	Paris Saint-Germain II	29	(5)
2007–2010	Paris Saint-Germain	2	(0)
2008–2009	→ Le Havre (loan)	13	(0)
2010–2011	Nîmes	23	(4)
2012–2013	Chernomorets Burgas	21	(8)
2013–2014	Zorya Luhansk	29	(14)
2014–2017	Anzhi Makhachkala	62	(26)
2017	Dalian Yifang	24	(16)
2018	Colorado Rapids	17	(2)
2019–2020	Ratchaburi	38	(22)
2020–2022	Port	16	(4)
2021–2022	→ Chiangmai United (loan)	16	(4)

International career
2010	Ivory Coast	1	(0)
- * Club domestic league appearances and goals as of 16 April 2022

Yannick Toapri Boli (born 13 January 1988) is a French professional footballer who plays as a forward.

His previous clubs include Paris Saint-Germain, Le Havre, Nîmes and Bulgarian Chernomorets. He is the nephew of former France national team player Basile Boli and Lens striker Roger Boli.

== Career ==
=== Club ===
Born in Saint-Maur-des-Fossés, Boli began his playing career with Ligue 1 side PSG, joining them when he was eleven years old.

He was part of the side's B team from 2005 to 2007. In 2006, he helped their 18 ans side to win the French 18 ans Championship and in his last season, he was a top scorer.

On 6 May 2008, he scored a 77th-minute winner against Ligue 2 side Amiens SC, in the semi-finals of the Coupe de France to send PSG into the final, where he was an unused substitute as they lost 1–0 to Lyon. On playing for PSG, Boli said, "PSG are the club of my dreams and I joined when I was 11. The fact that I'm now playing here with the first team gives me immense pride."

Boli was loaned to newly promoted Ligue 1 side Le Havre AC on 18 October 2008 until the end of the 2008–09 season, making his debut seven days later in a 2–1 home win over Valenciennes at Stade Jules Deschaseaux. He made a total of eleven league appearances, before returning to PSG in July 2009.

On 19 August 2009, Boli joined English Championship side Blackpool on trial, with Sky Sports reporting that he could be about to sign a one-year loan deal with the Seasiders. Boli said, "I am happy to be here in England, hopefully it (the move) will happen for me." The Blackpool Gazette then claimed it was unlikely Boli would sign, however The Times reported that he was expected to move to Blackpool on loan after a medical planned for 24 August.

In September 2011, Boli joined London based football agency Pro Sports Agency. He signed with Bulgarian A PFG club Chernomorets Burgas in February 2012 after a one-week trial period.

On 18 February 2013, he was sold to Ukrainian side Zorya Luhansk for a fee of €300.000. He signed a two-year contract.

On 29 August 2014, Boli was announced as an Anzhi Makhachkala player, signing a four-year contract. In November 2014, Boli was awarded Best Goal of the month and awarded the 1FNL Best Players on the Football National League official website.

After joining the club, managed by Sergei Tashuyev, Boli was introduced very slowly into the starting lineup. On his first game against SKA-Energia, he came on as a substitute player for just on 28 minutes.

He has scored 26 goals in 62 appearances for the Dagestan based FC Anzhi Makhachkala.

On 16 January 2017, Boli signed a two and half years contract with UAE Arabian Gulf League club Al Ain FC. On 18 January 2017, Al Ain decided to void the contract after "additional demands were made by Anzhi and Boli".

On 24 February 2017, Boli joined Chinese side Dalian Yifang, and scored 16 goals to promote the team to 2018 Chinese Super League.

On 15 March 2018, Boli signed a one-year deal with Major League Soccer side Colorado Rapids.

Boli joined Thai League 1 club Ratchaburi Mitr Phol F.C. in the 2019 season. He scored a debut hat-trick on 22 February 2019.

=== International ===
Boli holds dual French and Ivorian nationality. In 2008, ahead of the Summer Olympics in China, he chose to represent the Ivory Coast. "I'm lucky enough to have dual Franco-Ivorian nationality and I'm proud of my African roots," he said. "I've followed the Elephants a lot in the last few years and I feel there's an interesting situation there. Because of that, I didn't hesitate in choosing that country's shirt." In March 2008, he was called up by manager Gérard Gili to the Ivory Coast Olympics team. In 2010 he played the Toulon Tournament with Ivory Coast.

== Personal life ==
Yannick is the oldest brother of Kévin Boli and nephew of former Marseille and French international defender Basile Boli, and former Lens striker Roger Boli.

His cousin Yohan Boli currently plays for Al-Rayyan.

== Career statistics ==
=== Club ===
As of 16 April 2022

Appearances and goals by club, season and competition
Club	Season	League			National cup (Note: Includes Coupe de France, Bulgarian Cup, Ukrainian Cup, Russian Cup, Thai FA Cup)		League cup (Note: Includes Coupe de la Ligue, Thai League Cup)		Continental		Total	
Club	Season	Division	Apps	Goals	Apps	Goals	Apps	Goals	Apps	Goals	Apps	Goals
Paris; Saint-Germain	2006–07	Ligue 1	0	0	0	0	0	0	0	0	0	0
Paris; Saint-Germain	2007–08	Ligue 1	1	0	2	1	0	0	—		3	1
Paris; Saint-Germain	2008–09	Ligue 1	1	0	0	0	0	0	0	0	1	0
Paris; Saint-Germain	Total		2	0	2	1	0	0	0	0	4	1
Le Havre (loan)	2008–09	Ligue 1	11	0	1	0	1	0	—		13	0
Nîmes	2009–10	Ligue 2	15	3	0	0	0	0	—		15	3
Nîmes	2010–11	Ligue 2	8	1	1	0	0	0	—		9	1
Nîmes	Total		23	4	1	0	0	0	—		24	4
Chernomorets	2011–12	A Group	12	6	0	0	—		—		12	6
Chernomorets	2012–13	A Group	9	2	2	1	—		—		11	3
Chernomorets	Total		21	8	2	1	—		—		23	9
Zorya Luhansk	2012–13	Ukrainian Premier League	10	2	0	0	—		—		10	2
Zorya Luhansk	2013–14	Ukrainian Premier League	26	12	1	0	—		—		27	12
Zorya Luhansk	2014–15	Ukrainian Premier League	0	0	0	0	—		1 (Note: Appearance in UEFA Europa League)	0	1	0
Zorya Luhansk	Total		36	14	1	0	—		1	0	38	14
Anzhi Makhachkala	2014–15	Russian Football National League	23	15	1	1	—		—		24	16
Anzhi Makhachkala	2015–16	Russian Premier League	30	11	2	1	—		—		32	12
Anzhi Makhachkala	2016–17	Russian Premier League	11	2	0	0	—		—		11	2
Anzhi Makhachkala	Total		64	28	3	2	—		—		67	30
Dalian Yifang	2017	China League One	24	16	0	0	—		—		24	16
Colorado Rapids	2018	Major League Soccer	17	2	0	0	—		—		17	2
Ratchaburi	2019	Thai League 1	25	14	3	1	1	0	—		29	15
Ratchaburi	2020–21	Thai League 1	13	8	0	0	0	0	—		13	8
Ratchaburi	Total		38	22	3	1	1	0	—		42	23
Port	2020–21	Thai League 1	16	4	0	0	0	0	—		16	4
Chiangmai United (loan)	2021–22	Thai League 1	16	4	1	1	1	1	—		18	6
Career total			268	102	14	6	3	1	1	0	286	109

== Honours ==
Dalian Yifang

- China League One: 2017
