= Cidade de Guimarães Trophy =

Football tournament in Portugal

- Founded: 2007
- Region: Europe
- Teams: 2–3
- Current champions: (Portugal) FC Porto
- Most championships: (Portugal) Benfica (3 titles)
- Broadcaster: Sport TV

The Cidade de Guimarães Trophy is a soccer tournament played in the pre-season, hosted by Vitória de Guimarães.

== Tournaments ==
Year	1st	2nd	3rd
2007	(Portugal) Vitória de Guimarães	(Spain) Deportivo la Coruna	—N/a
2008	(Portugal) Benfica	(Portugal) Vitória de Guimarães	(France) Paris Saint-Germain
2009	(Portugal) Benfica	(Portugal) Vitória de Guimarães	(England) Portsmouth
2010	(Portugal) Benfica	(Portugal) Vitória de Guimarães	(Netherlands) Groningen
2016	(Portugal) FC Porto	(Portugal) Vitória de Guimarães	—N/a
2017	(Portugal) FC Porto	(Portugal) Vitória de Guimarães	—N/a

== 2007 ==
7 September 2007
21:00 WEST

Vitória de Guimarães (Portugal)	2–2	(Spain) Deportivo la Coruna
Mrdaković 19'; Fajardo 90+2'	Report	Taborda 59'; Pablo Alvarez 81'
Penalties
	5–3

Estádio D. Afonso Henriques, Guimarães
Referee: Augusto Duarte (Braga)

== 2008 ==
The 2008 competition took place between 1 August and 3 August 2008 and featured Vitória de Guimarães, Benfica and Paris Saint-Germain. Benfica won in the final match against Vitória de Guimarães.

4 August 2008
19:00 WEST

Vitória de Guimarães (Portugal)	1–2	(Portugal) Benfica
Moreno 67' (pen.)		Cardozo 19' (pen.); Momha 22' (o.g.)

Estádio D. Afonso Henriques, Guimarães
Attendance: 7,500
Referee: Jorge Sousa (Porto)

== 2009 ==
The 2009 competition took place between 31 July and 2 August 2009 and featured Vitória de Guimarães, Benfica and Portsmouth. Benfica won in the final match against Vitória de Guimarães.

2 August 2009
21:15 WEST

Vitória de Guimarães (Portugal)	0–2	(Portugal) Benfica
		Weldon 39'; Amorim 55'

Estádio D. Afonso Henriques, Guimarães
Referee: Jorge Sousa (Porto)

== 2010 ==
The 2010 competition took place between 17 July and 19 July, and featured Vitória de Guimarães, Benfica and Groningen. Benfica won in the final match against Vitória de Guimarães.

19 July 2010
20:15 WEST

Vitória de Guimarães (Portugal)	3–5	(Portugal) Benfica
Valdomiro 33', 90'; Douglas 61'		Kardec 6', 48'; Saviola 9'; Jara 54'; Martins 69'

Estádio D. Afonso Henriques, Guimarães
Referee: Jorge Sousa (Porto)

== 2016 ==
31 July 2016
20:00 WEST

Vitória de Guimarães (Portugal)	0–2	(Portugal) Porto
		Silva 8', 32'

Estádio D. Afonso Henriques, Guimarães
Attendance: 7,811
Referee: Carlos Xistra (Castelo Branco)

== 2017 ==
23 July 2017
20:30 WEST

Vitória de Guimarães (Portugal)	0–2	(Portugal) Porto
		Aboubakar 21'; Soares 26'

Estádio D. Afonso Henriques, Guimarães
Attendance: 10,000
Referee: Jorge Sousa (Porto)/João Pinheiro (Braga)

== Number of wins ==
Club	Winner	Runner-up
(Portugal) Benfica	3	0
(Portugal) Porto	2	0
(Portugal) Vitória de Guimarães	1	5
(Spain) Deportivo la Coruna	0	1
