= Jean Coral =

Brazilian footballer

Jean Carlos Alves Coral (born 2 January 1988) is a Brazilian former professional footballer who played as a forward.
