= Douglas (footballer, born 1986) =

Brazilian footballer (born 1986)

Personal information
- Full name: Douglas de Oliveira
- Date of birth: January 30, 1986 (age 40)
- Place of birth: Ponta Grossa, Brazil
- Height: 1.86 m (6 ft 1 in)
- Position: Forward

Team information
- Current team: Criciúma Esporte Clube

Youth career
- 2002–2004: América-MG

Senior career*
Years	Team	Apps	(Gls)
2005–2008	América-MG	50	(29)
2007	→ Grêmio (loan)	8	(0)
2008–2011	Vitória Guimarães	36	(4)
2011–2012	Braga	0	(0)
2011–2012	→ Beira-Mar (loan)	16	(1)
2012	Criciúma	14	(3)
- * Club domestic league appearances and goals as of 31 December 2012

Douglas de Oliveira, simply Douglas (born 30 January 1986 in Ponta Grossa, Paraná), is a Brazilian footballer who plays as attacker and that currently playing on Criciúma

== Football career ==
Douglas started his career with América Mineiro, also serving a brief loan at Grêmio. In summer 2008, he was sold to Vitória de Guimarães, spending his first season severely injured, but still scoring four goals in the league, namely in a 3–1 win at C.D. Trofense on 28 September 2008.

Douglas was sparingly used by Guimarães in the following two seasons combined, only finding the net once. On 1 June 2011, the free agent signed a four-year contract with Minho neighbours S.C. Braga, being loaned to fellow top-divisioner S.C. Beira-Mar the following month, in a season-long move.
