= Maxime Partouche =

French professional footballer (born 1990)

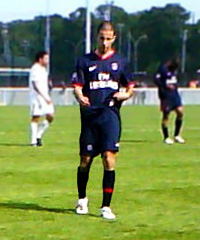
- Partouche with Paris Saint-Germain B in 2010

Personal information
- Full name: Maxime Nessim Partouche
- Date of birth: 5 June 1990 (age 36)
- Place of birth: Vélizy-Villacoublay, France
- Height: 1.72 m (5 ft 8 in)
- Positions: Midfielder; forward

Team information
- Current team: Boulogne-Billancourt

Youth career
- 1996–2002: Vélizy Football
- 2002–2008: Paris Saint-Germain

Senior career*
Years	Team	Apps	(Gls)
2007–2010	Paris Saint-Germain B		
2008–2010	Paris Saint-Germain	1	(0)
2010–2011	Panionios	0	(0)
2011–2012	Créteil	32	(3)
2012	Real Salt Lake Reserves	1	(0)
2012–2013	Versailles		
2014–2016	Jura Sud	65	(9)
2016–2019	Boulogne-Billancourt	68	(9)

International career
2005–2006	France U16	2	(0)
2008–2009	France U19	8	(2)
- * Club domestic league appearances and goals

Maxime Partouche (born 5 June 1990) is a French former professional footballer who played as a midfielder and forward.

== Club career ==
=== Paris Saint-Germain ===
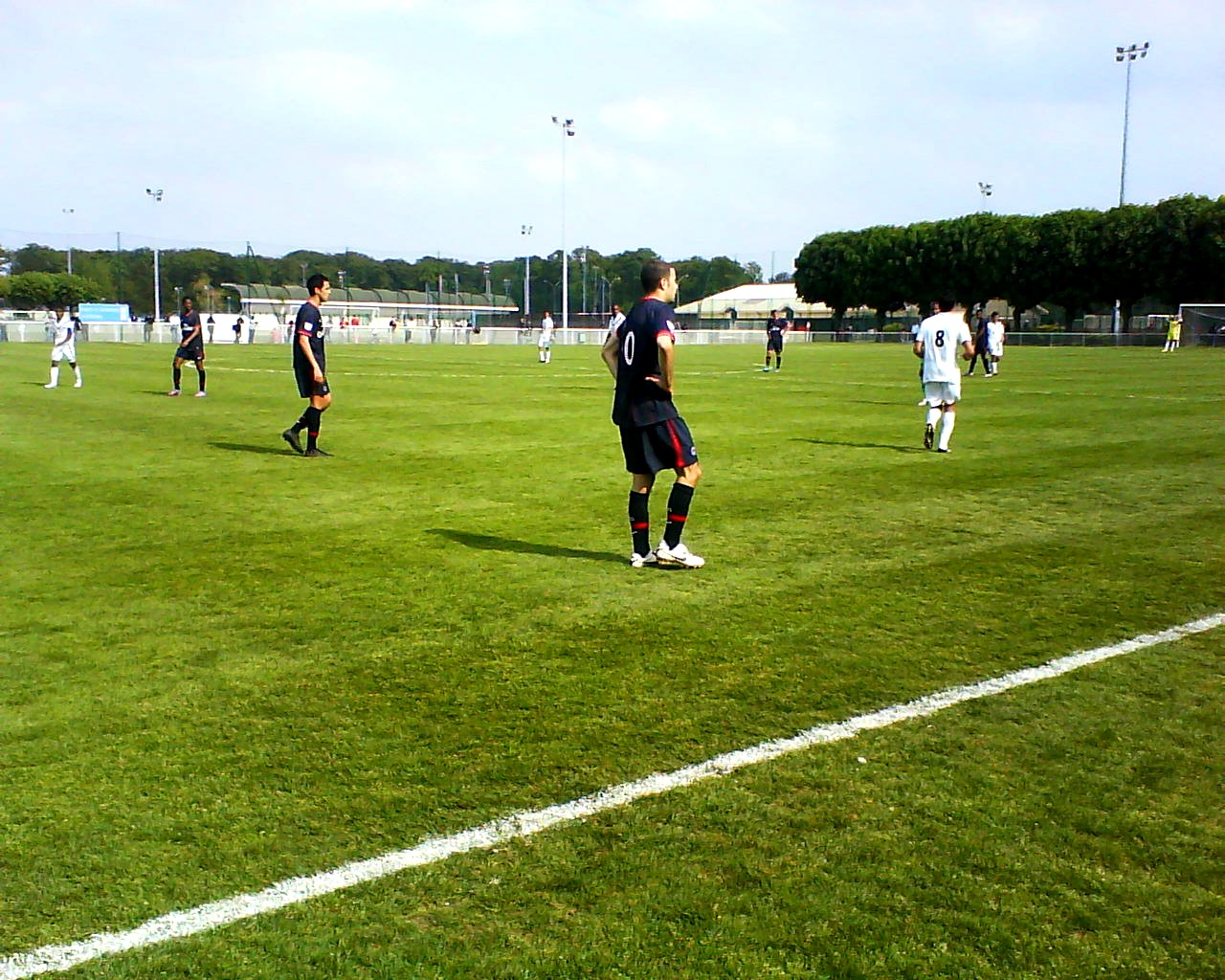
Partouche during a match between Paris Saint-Germain B and Bordeaux B in May 2010

Partouche began his career with his local club Vélizy Football in Paris. In July 2002, he moved to Paris Saint-Germain. After spending six years in the club's youth system, he was promoted to the senior squad in March 2008, and made his debut on the 18th of that month in a Coupe de France match against Bastia.

His performance against Bastia earned him regular appearances on PSG's bench for Ligue 1 matches, though he regularly played for PSG's CFA team during the 2007–08 and 2008–09 seasons. He finally made his Ligue 1 debut on 7 February 2009 in a 4–1 victory over Nantes, coming on as a late-match substitute.

On 18 February 2009, Partouche made his European debut in a match against Wolfsburg in the round of 32 of the UEFA Cup. He came on as a substitute in the 71st minute as PSG were victorious 2–0 thanks to two late goals from Guillaume Hoarau.

=== Panionios ===
On 15 September 2010, Partouche signed a three-year deal with Panionios, but returned to France after just a one-year spell. He never played in any league match for the Greek club.

=== Créteil ===
In June 2011, Partouche joined Championnat National side Créteil. He scored a total of 3 league goals in 32 appearances in one season at the club, but left after the expiration of his one-year contract.

=== Real Salt Lake Reserves ===
In July 2012, Partouche completed a trial with Major League Soccer side Real Salt Lake. He eventually played in an MLS Reserve League match for Real Salt Lake Reserves against Colorado Rapids Reserves on 5 August.

=== Versailles ===
Partouche joined Versailles in October 2012 after training with the team for over a month. There, he reunited with his former PSG youth coach Franck Bentolila.

=== Jura Sud ===
In January 2014, Partouche signed for Jura Sud. He would stay at the club two seasons, making 65 league appearances and scoring 9 goals in that time.

=== Boulogne-Billancourt ===
Partouche signed for Boulogne-Billancourt in June 2016.

== International career ==
Partouche is a France youth international, having played at U16, U17, and U18 level. He participated in the 2009 UEFA European Under-19 Championship with the under-19 team. He played in all four of the squad's matches, including the semi-final, where they suffered elimination, losing 3–1 in extra time to England.

== Honours ==
Paris Saint-Germain

- Coupe de France runner-up: 2007–08
