= Tripy Makonda =

French footballer (born 1990)

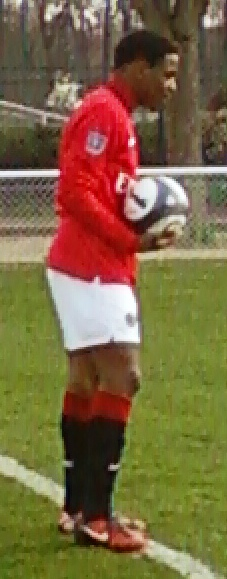

Personal information
- Full name: Tripy Deyingo Makonda
- Date of birth: 24 January 1990 (age 36)
- Place of birth: Ivry-sur-Seine, France
- Height: 5 ft 11 in (1.80 m)
- Position: Left back

Team information
- Current team: Blue Boys Muhlenbach

Youth career
- 1995–1998: Nicolaite de Chaillot Paris
- 1998–2002: Boulogne-Billancourt
- 2002–2009: Paris Saint-Germain

Senior career*
Years	Team	Apps	(Gls)
2009–2011	Paris Saint-Germain	27	(1)
2011–2015	Brest	50	(2)
2015–2017	Académica	36	(0)
2018–2019	AS Poissy	9	(0)
2019–	Blue Boys Muhlenbach	5	(1)

International career
2008–2009	France U19	9	(1)
2010	France U20	3	(0)
2010	France U21	5	(0)
- * Club domestic league appearances and goals as of 1 August 2017

Tripy Deyingo Makonda (born 24 January 1990) is a French footballer who plays as a left back for FC Blue Boys Muhlenbach in Luxembourg.

Makonda is a France youth international and has represented his nation at under-18, under-19, and under-20 level. Before joining Brest, he had been at Paris Saint-Germain since 2002 and made his professional debut during the 2008–09 season.

== Career ==
Makonda began his career at the age of five years joining Nicolaite de Chaillot, but had dreams of playing for the biggest Parisian club Paris Saint-Germain. He moved to sports club AC Boulogne-Billencourt in 1998, which also housed future French star Hatem Ben Arfa. During his time at A.C.B.B., he often played against the youths of Paris Saint-Germain, which is how he gained the attention of the club. Despite other offers from Ligue 1 clubs Lens and Toulouse, he refused to pass on the opportunity to play with his favorite club.

After spending nearly six years at the Camp des Loges, Makonda joined Paris Saint-Germain's Championnat de France amateur team in the fourth division for the latter part of the 2007–08 season. His performances caught the eye of manager Paul Le Guen, who called up the young midfielder for the senior team's Coupe de France semi-final match against Amiens SC, though he wouldn't make his debut. Makonda was promoted to the senior squad the following season and assigned the number 24 shirt. He made his professional debut on 18 February 2009 in a UEFA Cup match against German club VfL Wolfsburg playing 64 minutes before being substituted out. He made his league debut on 12 April 2009 in a match against Lille. Makonda started the match and played the full 90 minutes in a 0–0 draw. On 22 June 2009, he signed his first professional contract agreeing to a three-year deal with the club until 2012. He played for the capital club from 2009 to 2011, but struggled to secure a regular place. He made only nine league appearances over three seasons.

Makonda signed a four-year contract with Ligue 1 Brest on 22 July 2011.

On 2 February 2015, Makonda signed a deal with Académica valid for the next two and a half seasons. He made his league debut in a 2–0 away victory over Moreirense.

== International career ==
Makonda is a France youth international having played for the under-18, under-19, and under-20 teams. He participated in the 2009 UEFA European Under-19 Football Championship with the under-19 team. Makonda played in all four of the squad's matches including the semi-final, where they suffered elimination losing 3–1 in extra time to England.

== See also ==
- Sub-Saharan African community of Paris
