= 2001–02 RC Strasbourg season =

Season of a football league in France

Strasbourg
2001–02 season
- President: Patrick Proisy
- Head coach: Ivan Hašek
- Stadium: Stade de la Meinau
- Division 2: 2nd (promoted)
- Coupe de France: Quarter-finals
- Coupe de la Ligue: Quarter-finals
- Trophée des Champions: Runners-up
- UEFA Cup: First round
- Top goalscorer: League: Danijel Ljuboja (15); All: Danijel Ljuboja (25)

The 2001–02 season was the 96th season in the existence of RC Strasbourg and the club's first season back in the second division of French football. In addition to the domestic league, Strasbourg competed in this season's edition of the Coupe de France, Coupe de la Ligue and UEFA Cup. The season covered the period from 1 July 2001 to 30 June 2002.

== Players ==
=== First-team squad ===
Note: Flags indicate national team as defined under FIFA eligibility rules; some limited exceptions apply. Players may hold more than one non-FIFA nationality.

No.	Pos.	Nation	Player
30	GK	FRA	Nicolas Bonis
32	GK	PAR	José Luis Chilavert
16	GK	FRA	Thierry Debès
5	DF	FRA	Teddy Bertin
23	DF	SEN	Habib Beye
3	DF	FRA	Jean-Christophe Devaux
24	DF	FRA	Yannick Fischer
4	DF	FRA	Christian Bassila
27	DF	FRA	Jacques Momha
8	MF	FRA	Pascal Camadini
14	MF	ALG	Rafik Mezriche
25	MF	FRA	Guillaume Lacour
19	MF	MLI	Vincent Doukantié
18	MF	FRA	Pascal Johansen
10	MF	FRA	Corentin Martins

No.	Pos.	Nation	Player
6	MF	MAD	Stéphane Collet
22	MF	FRA	Fabrice Ehret
31	MF	FRA	Péguy Luyindula
28	MF	YUG	Danijel Ljuboja
21	MF	FRA	Stéphane Roda
9	FW	FRA	Pierre Laurent
7	FW	MLI	Mamadou Bagayoko
33	FW	SEN	Pape Thiaw
13	FW	ARG	Gonzalo Belloso
20	FW	MAR	Yacine Abdessadki
12	FW	POL	Grzegorz Spiewak
29	FW	FRA	Cédric Stoll
15	FW	FRA	Jacques Rémy
13	FW	GUF	Ludovic Viltard
11	FW	FIN	Mixu Paatelainen

== Competitions ==
Win Draw Loss

=== Overall record ===
Competition	First match	Last match	Starting round	Final position	Record							
Competition	First match	Last match	Starting round	Final position	Pld	W	D	L	GF	GA	GD	Win %
Division 2	29 July 2001	3 May 2002	Matchday 1	2nd	38	19	11	8	47	27	+20	50.00
Coupe de France	November 2001	TBD	Round of 64	Quarter-finals	4	3	0	1	6	3	+3	75.00
Coupe de la Ligue	September 2001	TBD	First round	Quarter-finals	4	3	0	1	9	3	+6	75.00
Trophée des Champions	19 July 2001		Final	Runners-up	1	0	0	1	1	4	−3	0.00
UEFA Cup	20 September 2001	27 September 2001	First round	First round	2	0	1	1	2	4	−2	0.00
Total					49	25	12	12	65	41	+24	51.02

Source: Competitions

=== French Division 2 ===
==== League table ====
Pos	Team	Pld	W	D	L	GF	GA	GD	Pts	Promotion or Relegation
1	Ajaccio (C, P)	38	20	12	6	47	25	+22	72	Promotion to Ligue 1
2	Strasbourg (P)	38	19	11	8	47	27	+20	68	Promotion to Ligue 1
3	Nice (P)	38	20	6	12	56	40	+16	66	Promotion to Ligue 1
4	Le Havre (P)	38	17	14	7	56	32	+24	65	Promotion to Ligue 1
5	Le Mans	38	16	10	12	48	41	+7	58	

Source: Ligue 2
(C) Champions; (P) Promoted

==== Results summary ====
Overall								Home						Away					
Pld	W	D	L	GF	GA	GD	Pts	W	D	L	GF	GA	GD	W	D	L	GF	GA	GD
38	19	11	8	47	27	+20	68	13	5	1	27	8	+19	6	6	7	20	19	+1

Source: Ligue 2

==== Results by round ====
Round	1	2	3	4	5	6	7	8	9	10	11	12	13	14	15	16	17	18	19	20	21	22	23	24	25	26	27	28	29	30	31	32	33	34	35	36	37	38
Ground	A	H	A	H	H	A	H	A	H	A	H	A	H	A	H	A	H	A	H	A	H	A	A	H	A	H	A	H	A	H	A	H	A	H	A	H	A	H
Result	D	W	W	W	W	D	W	L	D	D	W	D	W	L	W	W	W	D	W	L	W	L	W	W	W	D	L	W	L	L	L	D	D	D	W	D	W	W
Position	11	3	3	2	1	2	1	3	3	3	3	3	2	3	1	1	1	1	1	1	1	1	1	1	1	1	1	1	1	1	2	2	3	3	2	3	3	2

Source: Ligue 2
A = Away; H = Home; W = Win; D = Draw; L = Loss

==== Matches ====
29 July 2001 1	Le Havre	1–1	Strasbourg	Le Havre
--:-- CEST (UTC+2)		Report

4 August 2001 2	Strasbourg	3–0	Nice	Strasbourg
--:-- CEST (UTC+2)		Report		Stadium: Stade de la Meinau

11 August 2001 3	Istres	0–1	Strasbourg	Istres
--:-- CEST (UTC+2)		Report

18 August 2001 4	Strasbourg	4–1	Laval	Strasbourg
--:-- CEST (UTC+2)		Report		Stadium: Stade de la Meinau

24 August 2001 5	Strasbourg	2–0	Châteauroux	Strasbourg
--:-- CEST (UTC+2)		Report		Stadium: Stade de la Meinau

29 August 2001 6	Niort	1–1	Strasbourg	Niort
--:-- CEST (UTC+2)		Report

16 September 2001 8	Beauvais	1–0	Strasbourg	Beauvais
--:-- CEST (UTC+2)		Report

23 September 2001 9	Strasbourg	2–2	Nancy	Strasbourg
--:-- CEST (UTC+2)		Report		Stadium: Stade de la Meinau

30 September 2001 10	Saint-Étienne	1–1	Strasbourg	Beauvais
--:-- CEST (UTC+2)		Report

5 October 2001 11	Strasbourg	3–1	Caen	Strasbourg
--:-- CEST (UTC+2)		Report		Stadium: Stade de la Meinau

13 October 2001 12	Créteil	0–0	Strasbourg	Créteil
--:-- CEST (UTC+2)		Report

19 October 2001 13	Strasbourg	2–0	Le Mans	Strasbourg
--:-- CEST (UTC+2)		Report		Stadium: Stade de la Meinau

27 October 2001 14	Ajaccio	2–1	Strasbourg	Ajaccio
--:-- CEST (UTC+2)		Report

31 October 2001 7	Strasbourg	1–0	Nîmes	Strasbourg
--:-- CEST (UTC+2)		Report		Stadium: Stade de la Meinau

9 November 2001 15	Strasbourg	1–0	Wasquehal	Strasbourg
--:-- CET (UTC+1)		Report		Stadium: Stade de la Meinau

13 November 2001 16	Grenoble	0–3; Awarded	Strasbourg	Grenoble
--:-- CET (UTC+1)		Report

17 November 2001 17	Strasbourg	1–0	Amiens	Strasbourg
--:-- CET (UTC+1)		Report		Stadium: Stade de la Meinau

27 November 2001 18	Gueugnon	0–0	Strasbourg	Gueugnon
--:-- CET (UTC+1)		Report

8 December 2001 19	Strasbourg	1–0	Martigues	Strasbourg
--:-- CET (UTC+1)		Report		Stadium: Stade de la Meinau

19 December 2001 20	Nice	2–1	Strasbourg	Nice
--:-- CET (UTC+1)		Report

13 January 2002 23	Châteauroux	1–2	Strasbourg	Châteauroux
--:-- CET (UTC+1)		Report

23 January 2002 24	Strasbourg	1–0	Niort	Strasbourg
--:-- CET (UTC+1)		Report		Stadium: Stade de la Meinau

3 February 2002 26	Strasbourg	1–1	Beauvais	Strasbourg
--:-- CET (UTC+1)		Report		Stadium: Stade de la Meinau

6 February 2002 27	Nancy	2–1	Strasbourg	Tomblaine
--:-- CET (UTC+1)		Report

12 February 2002 28	Strasbourg	1–0	Saint-Étienne	Strasbourg
--:-- CET (UTC+1)		Report		Stadium: Stade de la Meinau

16 February 2002 29	Caen	2–1	Strasbourg	Caen
--:-- CET (UTC+1)		Report

23 February 2002 30	Strasbourg	0–2	Créteil	Strasbourg
--:-- CET (UTC+1)		Report		Stadium: Stade de la Meinau

2 March 2002 22	Laval	3–0	Strasbourg	Laval
--:-- CET (UTC+1)		Report

6 March 2002 31	Le Mans	1–0	Strasbourg	Le Mans
--:-- CET (UTC+1)		Report

15 March 2002 32	Strasbourg	0–0	Ajaccio	Strasbourg
--:-- CET (UTC+1)		Report		Stadium: Stade de la Meinau

23 March 2002 33	Wasquehal	1–1	Strasbourg	Wasquehal
--:-- CET (UTC+1)		Report

26 March 2002 34	Strasbourg	1–1	Grenoble	Strasbourg
--:-- CET (UTC+1)		Report		Stadium: Stade de la Meinau

1 April 2002 21	Strasbourg	2–0	Istres	Strasbourg
--:-- CEST (UTC+2)		Report		Stadium: Stade de la Meinau

5 April 2002 35	Amiens	0–2	Strasbourg	Amiens
--:-- CEST (UTC+2)		Report

9 April 2002 25	Nîmes	1–3	Strasbourg	Nîmes
--:-- CEST (UTC+2)		Report

13 April 2002 36	Strasbourg	0–0	Gueugnon	Strasbourg
--:-- CEST (UTC+2)		Report		Stadium: Stade de la Meinau

26 April 2002 37	Martigues	0–1	Strasbourg	Martigues
--:-- CEST (UTC+2)		Report

3 May 2002 38	Strasbourg	1–0	Le Havre	Strasbourg
--:-- CEST (UTC+2)		Report		Stadium: Stade de la Meinau

=== Coupe de la Ligue ===
1 September 2001 First round	Strasbourg	3–0	Niort	Strasbourg
--:-- CEST (UTC+2)				Stadium: Stade de la Meinau

1 December 2001 Round of 32	Strasbourg	2–0	Caen	Strasbourg
--:-- CET (UTC+1)				Stadium: Stade de la Meinau

8 January 2002 Round of 16	Amiens	0–2	Strasbourg	Amiens
--:-- CET (UTC+1)				Stadium: Stade de la Licorne

27 January 2002 Quarter-finals	Rennes	3–2	Strasbourg	Rennes
14:00 CET (UTC+1)				Stadium: Stade de la Route de Lorient

=== Trophée des Champions ===
19 July 2001 Final	Strasbourg	1–4	Nantes	Strasbourg
	Ljuboja 17'	Report	Quint 7'; Armand 38'; Dalmat 88'; Savinaud 90'	Stadium: Stade de la Meinau; Attendance: 7,685; Referee: Alain Sars

=== UEFA Cup ===
==== First round ====
20 September 2001 First leg	Standard Liège (Belgium)	2–0	(France) Strasbourg	Liège, Belgium
20:00	Moreira 40', 83'	Report		Stadium: Stade Maurice Dufrasne; Attendance: 14,264; Referee: Eduardo Iturralde González (Spain)

27 September 2001 Second leg	Strasbourg (France)	2–2 (2–4 agg.)	(Belgium) Standard Liège	Strasbourg, France
21:00	Ljuboja 5', 37'	Report	Goosens 57'; Vandooren 60'	Stadium: Stade de la Meinau; Attendance: 12,300; Referee: Drago Kos (Slovenia)
