= 2002–03 FC Nantes Atlantique season =

FC Nantes
2002–03 season
- President: Jean-Luc Gripond
- Head coach: Ángel Marcos
- Stadium: Stade de la Beaujoire
- Ligue 1: 9th
- Coupe de France: Round of 32
- Coupe de la Ligue: Quarter-finals
- Top goalscorer: League: Marama Vahirua (7); All: Marama Vahirua (7)
- Average home league attendance: 32,421

The 2002–03 season is FC Nantes's 60th season in existence and the club's 40th consecutive season in the top flight of French football. In addition to the domestic league, Nantes participated in this season's editions of the Coupe de France and the Coupe de la Ligue. The season covers the period from 1 July 2002 to 30 June 2003.

== Players ==
=== First-team squad ===
Squad at end of season

Note: Flags indicate national team as defined under FIFA eligibility rules; some limited exceptions apply. Players may hold more than one non-FIFA nationality.

No.	Pos.	Nation	Player
—	GK	FRA	Mickaël Landreau
—	GK	FRA	Willy Grondin
—	DF	ARG	Mauro Cetto
—	DF	FRA	Nicolas Gillet
—	DF	COL	Mario Yepes
—	DF	FRA	Pascal Delhommeau
—	DF	FRA	Sylvain Armand
—	DF	CMR	Jean-Hugues Ateba
—	DF	FRA	Denis Stinat
—	DF	FRA	Stéphen Drouin
—	MF	FRA	Frédéric Da Rocha

No.	Pos.	Nation	Player
—	MF	FRA	Mathieu Berson
—	MF	FRA	Olivier Quint
—	MF	FRA	Nicolas Savinaud
—	MF	FRA	Jérémy Toulalan
—	MF	CMR	Eric Djemba-Djemba
—	MF	CRO	Goran Rubil
—	MF	FRA	Loïc Pailleres
—	MF	FRA	Stéphane Ziani
—	FW	GAB	Shiva Star N'Zigou
—	FW	ROU	Viorel Moldovan
—	FW	POR	Ariza Makukula
—	FW	FRA	Marama Vahirua

== Transfers ==
=== In ===
No.	Pos	Player	Transferred from	Fee	Date	Source
15			TBD		1 July 2002	

=== Out ===
No.	Pos	Player	Transferred to	Fee	Date	Source
15			TBD		1 July 2002	

== Pre-season and friendlies ==
Win Draw Loss

August 2002 Friendly	Nantes (France)	–	(France)
CEST (UTC+2)

August 2002 Friendly	Nantes (France)	–	(France)
CEST (UTC+2)

== Competitions ==
=== Overall record ===
Competition	First match	Last match	Starting round	Final position	Record							
Competition	First match	Last match	Starting round	Final position	Pld	W	D	L	GF	GA	GD	Win %
Ligue 1	3 August 2002	24 May 2003	Matchday 1	9th	38	16	8	14	37	39	−2	42.11
Coupe de France	11 January 2003	25 January 2003	Round of 64	Round of 32	2	1	0	1	2	1	+1	50.00
Coupe de la Ligue	8 December 2002	5 March 2003	Round of 32	Quarter-finals	3	1	1	1	6	7	−1	33.33
Total					43	18	9	16	45	47	−2	41.86

Source: Competitions

=== Ligue 1 ===
==== League table ====
Pos	Team	Pld	W	D	L	GF	GA	GD	Pts	Qualification or relegation
7	Guingamp	38	19	5	14	59	46	+13	62	Qualification to Intertoto Cup third round
8	Lens	38	14	15	9	43	31	+12	57	Qualification to UEFA Cup qualifying round (Note: Lens qualified for the UEFA Cup qualifying round through the UEFA Fair Play ranking award.)
9	Nantes	38	16	8	14	37	39	−2	56	Qualification to Intertoto Cup third round
10	Nice	38	13	16	9	39	31	+8	55	Qualification to Intertoto Cup second round
11	Paris Saint-Germain	38	14	12	12	47	36	+11	54	

Source: Ligue 1
Rules for classification: 1) points; 2) goal difference; 3) number of goals scored.

==== Results summary ====
Overall								Home						Away					
Pld	W	D	L	GF	GA	GD	Pts	W	D	L	GF	GA	GD	W	D	L	GF	GA	GD
38	16	8	14	37	39	−2	56	11	4	4	25	18	+7	5	4	10	12	21	−9

Source: worldfootball.net

==== Results by round ====
Round	1	2	3	4	5	6	7	8	9	10	11	12	13	14	15	16	17	18	19	20	21	22	23	24	25	26	27	28	29	30	31	32	33	34	35	36	37	38
Ground	A	H	A	H	A	A	H	A	H	A	H	A	H	A	H	A	H	A	H	A	H	A	H	H	A	H	A	H	A	H	A	H	A	H	A	H	A	H
Result	W	W	L	D	L	L	W	L	L	L	D	D	D	W	W	W	W	L	W	L	L	W	W	L	D	W	W	W	D	W	D	W	L	D	L	L	L	W
Position	3	1	5	7	10	11	11	11	13	16	15	16	16	15	13	13	8	10	9	9	11	11	9	10	9	9	8	8	8	5	6	5	7	8	10	10	11	9

A = Away; H = Home; W = Win; D = Draw; L = Loss

==== Matches ====
3 August 2002 1	Marseille	0–2	Nantes	Lyon
17:15 CEST (UTC+2)				Stadium: Stade de Gerland; Attendance: 7,742; Referee: Bruno Derrien

10 August 2002 2	Nantes	1–0	Bastia	Nantes
20:00 CEST (UTC+2)				Stadium: Stade de la Beaujoire; Attendance: 34,333; Referee: Claude Colombo

17 August 2002 3	Sochaux	4–2	Nantes	Montbéliard
20:00 CEST (UTC+2)				Stadium: Stade Auguste Bonal; Attendance: 14,433; Referee: Pascal Garibian

24 August 2002 4	Nantes	2–2	Lens	Nantes
17:15 CEST (UTC+2)				Stadium: Stade de la Beaujoire; Attendance: 34,084; Referee: Bruno Coué

31 August 2002 5	Sedan	1–0	Nantes	Sedan
20:00 CEST (UTC+2)				Stadium: Stade Louis Dugauguez; Attendance: 13,240; Referee: Damien Ledentu

11 September 2002 6	Monaco	2–1	Nantes	Monaco
20:30 CEST (UTC+2)				Stadium: Stade Louis II; Attendance: 6,634; Referee: Philippe Kalt

14 September 2002 7	Nantes	1–0	Lyon	Nantes
20:00 CEST (UTC+2)				Stadium: Stade de la Beaujoire; Attendance: 33,444; Referee: Hervé Piccirillo

21 September 2002 8	Rennes	1–0	Nantes	Rennes
20:00 CEST (UTC+2)				Stadium: Stade de la Route de Lorient; Attendance: 20,37; Referee: Patrick Lhermite

28 September 2002 9	Nantes	1–4	Auxerre	Nantes
CEST (UTC+2)				Stadium: Stade de la Beaujoire

5 October 2002 10	Ajaccio	1–0	Nantes	Ajaccio
CEST (UTC+2)

19 October 2002 11	Nantes	0–0	Nice	Nantes
CEST (UTC+2)				Stadium: Stade de la Beaujoire

26 October 2002 12	Le Havre	1–1	Nantes	Le Havre
CEST (UTC+2)

3 November 2002 13	Nantes	0–0	Bordeaux	Nantes
CET (UTC+1)				Stadium: Stade de la Beaujoire

9 November 2002 14	Lille	0–1	Nantes	Lille
CET (UTC+1)				Stadium: Stade Grimonprez-Jooris

16 November 2002 15	Nantes	4–1	Strasbourg	Nantes
CET (UTC+1)				Stadium: Stade de la Beaujoire

22 November 2002 16	Paris Saint-Germain	0–1	Nantes	Paris
CET (UTC+1)				Stadium: Parc des Princes

30 November 2002 17	Nantes	3–1	Montpellier	Nantes
CET (UTC+1)				Stadium: Stade de la Beaujoire

4 December 2002 18	Guingamp	2–0	Nantes	Guingamp
CET (UTC+1)

15 December 2002 19	Nantes	2–1	Troyes	Nantes
CET (UTC+1)				Stadium: Stade de la Beaujoire

20 December 2002 20	Bastia	3–1	Nantes	Furiani
CET (UTC+1)

22 January 2003 23	Nantes	4–1	Sedan	Nantes
CET (UTC+1)				Stadium: Stade de la Beaujoire

29 January 2003 24	Nantes	0–2	Monaco	Nantes
CET (UTC+1)				Stadium: Stade de la Beaujoire

1 February 2003 25	Lyon	0–0	Nantes	Lyon
CET (UTC+1)

5 February 2003 26	Nantes	1–0	Rennes	Nantes
CET (UTC+1)				Stadium: Stade de la Beaujoire

9 February 2003 27	Auxerre	0–1	Nantes	Auxerre
CET (UTC+1)

15 February 2003 21	Nantes	0–1	Sochaux	Nantes
CET (UTC+1)				Stadium: Stade de la Beaujoire

22 February 2003 28	Nantes	1–0	Ajaccio	Nantes
CET (UTC+1)				Stadium: Stade de la Beaujoire

28 February 2003 29	Nice	1–1	Nantes	Nice
CET (UTC+1)

8 March 2003 30	Nantes	2–0	Le Havre	Nantes
CET (UTC+1)				Stadium: Stade de la Beaujoire

14 March 2003 22	Lens	0–1	Nantes	Lens
CET (UTC+1)

22 March 2003 31	Bordeaux	0–0	Nantes	Bordeaux
CET (UTC+1)

5 April 2003 32	Nantes	1–0	Lille	Nantes
CEST (UTC+2)				Stadium: Stade de la Beaujoire

12 April 2003 33	Strasbourg	2–0	Nantes
CEST (UTC+2)

19 April 2003 34	Nantes	1–1	Paris Saint-Germain	Nantes
CEST (UTC+2)				Stadium: Stade de la Beaujoire

3 May 2003 35	Montpellier	1–0	Nantes	Montpellier
CEST (UTC+2)

10 May 2003 36	Nantes	0–4	Guingamp	Nantes
CEST (UTC+2)				Stadium: Stade de la Beaujoire

20 May 2003 37	Troyes	2–0	Nantes	Troyes
CEST (UTC+2)

24 May 2003 38	Nantes	1–0	Marseille	Nantes
CEST (UTC+2)				Stadium: Stade de la Beaujoire

=== Coupe de France ===
11 January 2003 Round of 64	Reims	0–2	Nantes	Reims
17:00 CET (UTC+1)			Pujol 65'; Gillet 90+2'	Stadium: Stade Auguste Delaune; Attendance: 8,600; Referee: Bruno Ruffray
Note: Match originally scheduled for 4 January, but postponed due to snowy terrain.

25 January 2003 Round of 32	Lorient	1–0	Nantes	Lorient
18:15 CET (UTC+1)	Kroupi 87'			Stadium: Stade du Moustoir; Attendance: 11,321; Referee: Éric Poulat

=== Coupe de la Ligue ===
8 December 2002 Round of 32	Paris Saint-Germain	2–3	Nantes	Paris
20:45 CET (UTC+1)	Nyarko 43'; Heinze 50'; Ronaldinho (penalty missed) 83'		Yepes 27'; Armand 35'; Alonzo 78' (o.g.)	Stadium: Parc des Princes; Attendance: 23,176; Referee: Bruno Coué

19 January 2003 Round of 16	Guingamp	3–3 (a.e.t.) (2–4 p)	Nantes	Guingamp
15:00 CET (UTC+1)	Malouda 90+3', 114'; Bardon 110' (pen.)		Quint 59'; Gillet 101' (pen.); André 105'	Stadium: Stade de Roudourou; Attendance: 10,488; Referee: Damien Ledentu

5 March 2003 Quarter-finals	Nantes	0–2	Metz	Nantes
21:00 CET (UTC+1)			Adebayor 82', 87' (pen.)	Stadium: Stade de la Beaujoire; Attendance: 26,258; Referee: Pascal Viléo
