= 2001–02 FC Nantes Atlantique season =

FC Nantes Atlantique
2001–02 season
- President: Jean-Luc Gripond
- Head coach: Ángel Marcos
- Stadium: Stade de la Beaujoire
- French Division 1: 10th
- Coupe de France: Round of 64
- Coupe de la Ligue: Round of 16
- Trophée des Champions: Winners
- UEFA Champions League: Second group stage
- Top goalscorer: League: Marama Vahirua (6); All: Viorel Moldovan; Marama Vahirua (7 each)
- Average home league attendance: 32,512

The 2001–02 season was the 58th season in the history of FC Nantes Atlantique and the club's 40th consecutive season in the top flight of French football. In addition to the domestic league, Nantes participated in this season's editions of the Coupe de France.

== Competitions ==
=== Overall record ===
Competition	First match	Last match	Starting round	Final position	Record							
Competition	First match	Last match	Starting round	Final position	Pld	W	D	L	GF	GA	GD	Win %
French Division 1	27 July 2001	4 May 2002	Matchday 1	10th	34	12	7	15	35	41	−6	35.29
Coupe de France	14 December 2001		Round of 64	Round of 64	1	0	0	1	1	3	−2	0.00
Coupe de la Ligue	December 2001	January 2002	Round of 32	Round of 16	2	1	0	1	4	5	−1	50.00
Trophée des Champions	19 July 2001		Final	Winners	1	1	0	0	4	1	+3	100.00
UEFA Champions League	11 September 2001	19 March 2002	First group stage	Second group stage	12	3	4	5	12	14	−2	25.00
Total					50	17	11	22	56	64	−8	34.00

Source: Competitions

=== French Division 1 ===
==== League table ====
Pos	Team	Pld	W	D	L	GF	GA	GD	Pts	Qualification or relegation
8	Sochaux	34	12	10	12	41	40	+1	46	Qualification to Intertoto Cup second round
9	Marseille	34	11	11	12	34	39	−5	44	
10	Nantes	34	12	7	15	35	41	−6	43	
11	Bastia	34	12	5	17	38	44	−6	41	
12	Rennes	34	11	8	15	40	51	−11	41	

Source: Ligue 1
Rules for classification: 1) points; 2) goal difference; 3) number of goals scored.

==== Results summary ====
Overall								Home						Away					
Pld	W	D	L	GF	GA	GD	Pts	W	D	L	GF	GA	GD	W	D	L	GF	GA	GD
34	12	7	15	35	41	−6	43	8	4	5	25	16	+9	4	3	10	10	25	−15

Source: French Division 1

==== Results by round ====
Round	1	2	3	4	5	6	7	8	9	10	11	12	13	14	15	16	17	18	19	20	21	22	23	24	25	26	27	28	29	30	31	32	33	34
Ground	A	H	A	H	A	H	A	A	H	A	H	A	H	A	H	A	H	A	H	A	H	A	H	H	A	H	A	H	A	H	A	H	A	H
Result	L	L	D	L	L	D	L	L	D	L	D	W	W	L	L	W	L	L	W	W	W	D	W	W	L	L	L	D	W	W	D	W	L	W
Position	15	17	17	18	18	18	18	18	18	18	18	18	18	18	18	18	18	18	17	16	14	14	12	11	12	13	13	14	12	10	10	9	11	10

Source: French Division 1
A = Away; H = Home; W = Win; D = Draw; L = Loss

==== Matches ====
27 July 2001 1	Bordeaux	2–0	Nantes	Bordeaux
20:45				Stadium: Stade Chaban-Delmas; Attendance: 32,083

4 August 2001 2	Nantes	1–2	Lens	Nantes
17:15				Stadium: Stade de la Beaujoire; Attendance: 33,787

11 August 2001 3	Troyes	0–0	Nantes	Troyes
				Stadium: Stade de l'Aube

18 August 2001 4	Nantes	1–2	Bastia	Nantes
				Stadium: Stade de la Beaujoire

25 August 2001 5	Guingamp	1–0	Nantes	Guingamp
				Stadium: Stade de Roudourou

8 September 2001 6	Nantes	1–1	Sedan	Nantes
				Stadium: Stade de la Beaujoire

15 September 2001 7	Lyon	4–1	Nantes	Lyon
				Stadium: Stade de Gerland

22 September 2001 8	Marseille	2–0	Nantes	Marseille
				Stadium: Stade Vélodrome

29 September 2001 9	Nantes	0–0	Metz	Nantes
				Stadium: Stade de la Beaujoire

13 October 2001 10	Lille	1–0	Nantes	Lille
				Stadium: Stade Grimonprez-Jooris

20 October 2001 11	Nantes	2–2	Auxerre	Nantes
				Stadium: Stade de la Beaujoire

27 October 2001 12	Sochaux	0–1	Nantes	Montbéliard
				Stadium: Stade Auguste Bonal

3 November 2001 13	Nantes	2–1	Monaco	Nantes
				Stadium: Stade de la Beaujoire; Attendance: 34,869

17 November 2001 14	Rennes	2–0	Nantes	Rennes
				Stadium: Stade de la Route de Lorient

25 November 2001 15	Nantes	1–2	Paris Saint-Germain	Nantes
20:45				Stadium: Stade de la Beaujoire; Attendance: 33,966

28 November 2001 16	Lorient	1–2	Nantes	Lorient
				Stadium: Stade du Moustoir; Attendance: 14,687

8 December 2001 17	Nantes	1–2	Montpellier	Nantes
				Stadium: Stade de la Beaujoire; Attendance: 30,435

18 December 2001 18	Lens	3–0	Nantes	Lens
				Stadium: Stade Bollaert-Delelis; Attendance: 37,452

22 December 2001 19	Nantes	1–0	Troyes	Nantes
				Stadium: Stade de la Beaujoire; Attendance: 29,552

5 January 2002 20	Bastia	0–2	Nantes	Furiani
				Stadium: Stade Armand-Cesari; Attendance: 5,508

12 January 2002 21	Nantes	2–0	Guingamp	Nantes
				Stadium: Stade de la Beaujoire; Attendance: 31,778

23 January 2002 22	Sedan	0–0	Nantes	Sedan
				Stadium: Stade Louis Dugauguez

29 January 2002 23	Nantes	3–0	Lyon	Nantes
				Stadium: Stade de la Beaujoire; Attendance: 31,966

3 February 2002 24	Nantes	3–1	Marseille	Nantes
				Stadium: Stade de la Beaujoire; Attendance: 35,453

6 February 2002 25	Metz	2–0	Nantes	Metz
				Stadium: Stade Saint-Symphorien

16 February 2002 26	Nantes	0–1	Lille	Nantes
				Stadium: Stade de la Beaujoire; Attendance: 34,838

23 February 2002 27	Auxerre	2–1	Nantes	Auxerre
				Stadium: Stade de l'Abbé-Deschamps

6 March 2002 28	Nantes	0–0	Sochaux	Nantes
				Stadium: Stade de la Beaujoire; Attendance: 33,294

16 March 2002 29	Monaco	1–2	Nantes	Monaco
				Stadium: Stade Louis II

23 March 2002 30	Nantes	3–1	Rennes	Nantes
				Stadium: Stade de la Beaujoire; Attendance: 35,343

6 April 2002 31	Paris Saint-Germain	1–1	Nantes	Paris
				Stadium: Parc des Princes; Attendance: 43,817

13 April 2002 32	Nantes	2–0	Lorient	Nantes
				Stadium: Stade de la Beaujoire; Attendance: 34,940

27 April 2002 33	Montpellier	3–0	Nantes	Montpellier
				Stadium: Stade de la Mosson

4 May 2002 34	Nantes	2–1	Bordeaux	Nantes
				Stadium: Stade de la Beaujoire; Attendance: 34,972

=== Coupe de France ===
14 December 2001 Round of 64	Bastia	3–1	Nantes	Furiani

=== Coupe de la Ligue ===
1 December 2001 Round of 32	Nantes	3–2 (a.e.t.)	Sedan	Nantes

8 January 2002 Round of 16	Nantes	1–3	Bastia	Nantes

=== Trophée des Champions ===
19 July 2001 Final	Strasbourg	1–4	Nantes	Strasbourg
	Ljuboja 17'	Report	Quint 7'; Armand 38'; Dalmat 88'; Savinaud 90'	Stadium: Stade de la Meinau; Attendance: 7,685; Referee: Alain Sars

=== UEFA Champions League ===
==== First group stage ====
Pos	Team	Pld	W	D	L	GF	GA	GD	Pts	Qualification	NAN	GAL	PSV	LAZ
1	(France) Nantes	6	3	2	1	8	3	+5	11	Advance to second group stage	—	0–1	4–1	1–0
2	(Turkey) Galatasaray	6	3	1	2	5	4	+1	10	Advance to second group stage	0–0	—	2–0	1–0
3	(Netherlands) PSV Eindhoven	6	2	1	3	6	9	−3	7	Transfer to UEFA Cup	0–0	3–1	—	1–0
4	(Italy) Lazio	6	2	0	4	4	7	−3	6		1–3	1–0	2–1	—

Source: RSSSF

11 September 2001 1	Nantes (France)	4–1	(Netherlands) PSV Eindhoven	Nantes
20:45				Stadium: Stade de la Beaujoire

19 September 2001 2	Lazio (Italy)	1–3	(France) Nantes	Rome
20:45				Stadium: Stadio Olimpico

26 September 2001 3	Nantes (France)	0–1	(Turkey) Galatasaray	Nantes
20:45				Stadium: Stade de la Beaujoire

16 October 2001 4	Galatasaray (Turkey)	0–0	(France) Nantes	Istanbul
21:45				Stadium: Ali Sami Yen Stadium

24 October 2001 5	PSV Eindhoven (Netherlands)	0–0	(France) Nantes	Eindhoven
20:45				Stadium: Philips Stadion

30 October 2001 6	Nantes (France)	1–0	(Italy) Lazio	Nantes
20:45				Stadium: Stade de la Beaujoire

==== Second group stage ====
Pos	Team	Pld	W	D	L	GF	GA	GD	Pts	Qualification	MUN	BAY	BOA	NAN
1	(England) Manchester United	6	3	3	0	13	3	+10	12	Advance to knockout stage	—	0–0	3–0	5–1
2	(Germany) Bayern Munich	6	3	3	0	5	2	+3	12	Advance to knockout stage	1–1	—	1–0	2–1
3	(Portugal) Boavista	6	1	2	3	2	8	−6	5		0–3	0–0	—	1–0
4	(France) Nantes	6	0	2	4	4	11	−7	2		1–1	0–1	1–1	—

Source: RSSSF

20 November 2001 1	Boavista (Portugal)	1–0	(France) Nantes	Porto
				Stadium: Estádio do Bessa; Attendance: 7,700

5 December 2001 2	Nantes (France)	0–1	(Germany) Bayern Munich	Nantes
				Stadium: Stade de la Beaujoire; Attendance: 28,167

20 February 2002 3	Nantes (France)	1–1	(England) Manchester United	Nantes
				Stadium: Stade de la Beaujoire; Attendance: 35,783

26 February 2002 4	Manchester United (England)	5–1	(France) Nantes	Manchester
				Stadium: Old Trafford; Attendance: 66,492

13 March 2002 5	Nantes (France)	1–1	(Portugal) Boavista	Nantes
				Stadium: Stade de la Beaujoire; Attendance: 26,929

19 March 2002 6	Bayern Munich (Germany)	2–1	(France) Nantes	Munich
				Stadium: Olympiastadion; Attendance: 32,000

== Statistics ==
=== Appearances and goals ===
No.	Pos	Nat	Player	Total		Ligue 1		Coupe de France		Coupe de la Ligue	
No.	Pos	Nat	Player	Apps	Goals	Apps	Goals	Apps	Goals	Apps	Goals
Goalkeepers
	GK	(France) FRA	Willy Grondin	1	0	1	0	0	0	0	0
	GK	(France) FRA	Mickaël Landreau	33	0	33	0	0	0	0	0
Defenders
	DF	(France) FRA	Pascal Delhommeau	4	0	4	0	0	0	0	0
	DF	(Argentina) ARG	Mauro Cetto	5	0	5	0	0	0	0	0
	DF	(France) FRA	Yves Deroff	10	0	10	0	0	0	0	0
	DF	(Colombia) COL	Mario Yepes	11	0	11	0	0	0	0	0
	DF	(Colombia) COL	Nicolas Gillet	25	0	25	0	0	0	0	0
Midfielders
	MF	(France) FRA	[[ ]]	0	0	0	0	0	0	0	0
	MF	(France) FRA	[[ ]]	0	0	0	0	0	0	0	0
	MF	(France) FRA	[[ ]]	0	0	0	0	0	0	0	0
Forwards
	FW	(France) FRA	[[ ]]	0	0	0	0	0	0	0	0
	FW	(France) FRA	[[ ]]	0	0	0	0	0	0	0	0
	FW	(France) FRA	[[ ]]	0	0	0	0	0	0	0	0

Source: Competitions
