= Jérémy Toulalan =

French footballer (born 1983)

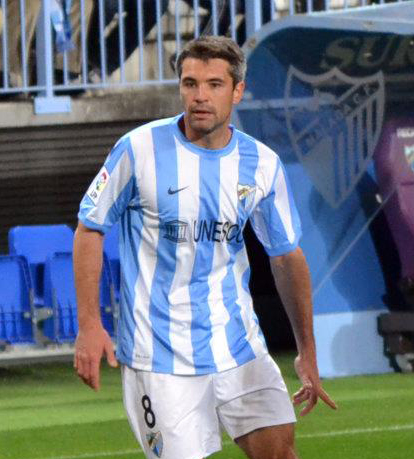
- Toulalan playing for Málaga in 2012

Personal information
- Full name: Jérémy Toulalan
- Date of birth: 10 September 1983 (age 43)
- Place of birth: Nantes, France
- Height: 1.83 m (6 ft 0 in)
- Position: Defensive midfielder

Youth career
- 1998–2001: Nantes

Senior career*
Years	Team	Apps	(Gls)
2001–2006	Nantes	94	(1)
2006–2011	Lyon	154	(0)
2011–2013	Málaga	44	(3)
2013–2016	Monaco	82	(1)
2016–2018	Bordeaux	51	(0)
Total		425	(5)

International career
2000-2001	France U17	9	(4)
2002-2003	France U19	7	(1)
2003–2006	France U21	19	(5)
2006–2010	France	36	(0)
- * Club domestic league appearances and goals

Jérémy Toulalan (born 10 September 1983) is a French former professional footballer who played as a defensive midfielder, but was also utilized as a central defender. He is best known for his humble demeanor, simple distribution, good technique and effective tackling.

Toulalan started his career at hometown club Nantes and made his debut in March 2002. His performances during the 2004–05 season earned him the UNFP Ligue 1 Player of the Year award and also an appearance in the Team of the Year. In May 2006, Toulalan joined Lyon on a four-year contract and helped the team win back-to-back league titles in 2007 and 2008. In June 2011, he joined Málaga.

Toulalan also played for the France national team both at senior and several youth levels. He made his senior international debut in October 2006 and represented his nation at two international tournaments: UEFA Euro 2008 and the 2010 FIFA World Cup.

== Club career ==
=== Early career ===
Born in Nantes, Toulalan is a product of the local Nantes youth academy making his first-team debut during the 2001–02 season against Rennes in the annual Derby Breton, coming on as a substitute in a 3–1 victory. He later made an appearance with the senior team in a UEFA Cup match before being relegated back to the reserves. Over the next two seasons, Toulalan's participation with the first-team was heavily limited. It wasn't until the 2004–05 season where he established himself as a strong midfielder. During this season, Toulalan also scored his only goal for Nantes in a 2–0 win over Strasbourg. Due to his performances, he was named the UNFP Young Player of the Year and also elected to the league's Team of the Year. However, despite Toulalan's impressive performances, Nantes finished one spot short of relegation, in 17th. He proceeded to have another solid season in 2005–06 before opting to move elsewhere.

=== Olympique Lyonnais ===
Following the 2004–05 season, then three-time Ligue 1 champions Lyon were highly interested in Toulalan, offering as much as €10 million for the player's services, though they were rebuffed by Nantes. After the 2005–06 season, the departures of Mahamadou Diarra to Real Madrid and Jérémy Clément to Rangers saw Lyon increase their efforts to sign Toulalan, who they considered a perfect replacement for Diarra. After a week of negotiations, on 17 May 2006 Nantes agreed to a fee of €7 million, while Toulalan agreed to a four-year deal making him Lyon's first summer signing that season. Due to the number 17, which he wore at Nantes, being retired by Lyon out of respect to the late Marc-Vivien Foé, Toulalan was given the number 28 shirt.

Toulalan made his competitive debut for Lyon against his former club Nantes, playing the full 90 minutes in a 3–1 win. He was a key component during the season, helping Lyon capture their six-straight league title. Toulalan formed midfield partnerships with the Brazilian Juninho, the Swede Kim Källström, and the Portuguese midfielder Tiago that allowed the team to win the league by a large 17-point gap.

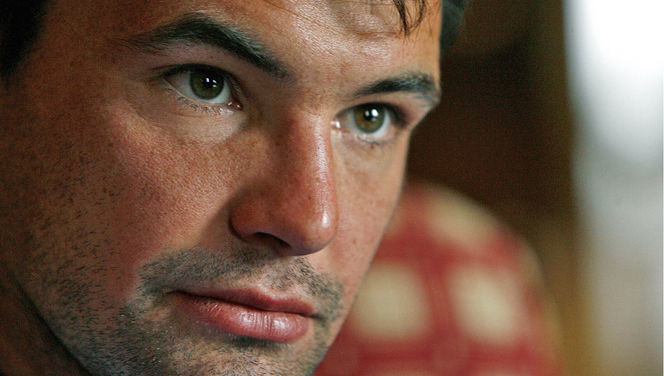
Toulalan during a February 2010 interview.

For his performances during the 2007–08 season, Toulalan was among four nominated for the UNFP Ligue 1 Player of the Year award, despite playing in the defensive midfielder role. The award went to his teammate Karim Benzema.

His performances did not go unnoticed by other clubs. Following the season, Toulalan was heavily linked with English clubs Arsenal and Chelsea, who both believed the player would be a perfect replacement for the departed Patrick Vieira and Claude Makélélé, respectively. Arsenal manager Arsène Wenger sent fellow Frenchman and Arsenal scout Gilles Grimandi to France on numerous occasions to scout the player. However, Toulalan played down the interest, stating he was happy at Lyon. On 7 March 2008, the midfielder verified his statement by signing a contract extension, which would keep him at the club until 2013. On 13 January 2010, Toulalan scored his first career goal for Lyon, and the second of his career, in a Coupe de la Ligue match against Metz.

=== Málaga ===
On 11 June 2011, La Liga club Málaga and Lyon confirmed the transfer of Toulalan for €10 million on a four-year deal. On 28 November 2011, he opened the scoring with a header in a 2−1 home win over Villarreal and was later sent off during the game. His suspension, however, was later removed by the Royal Spanish Football Federation (RFEF). On 12 February 2012, he scored from a volley in a 3−1 home victory over Mallorca, then scored his third league goal of the season on 3 March in a 3−1 away win over Getafe. On 21 March 2012, however, it was announced that Toulalan had been injured during training session, and that he would miss the rest of the season as his injury would require an operation.

=== AS Monaco ===
On 6 July 2013, AS Monaco announced the signing of Toulalan from Málaga; he signed a two-year contract.

== International career ==
Toulalan was a France international from 2000, when he was first called up to the France under-17 squad. He also played for the under-18 squad. Toulalan was later a member of the French squad that participated in the 2006 UEFA U-21 Championship, helping France reach the semi-finals before losing to the Netherlands. He was named in the Team of the Tournament as a left winger in order to accommodate central midfielders Ismaïl Aissati and France teammate Rio Mavuba, who were also in the selection.

Toulalan received his first call-up to the senior side in 2006 for a Euro 2008 qualification match against the Faroe Islands. He started the match and played the full 90 minutes in France's 5–0 win. Due to his performances with Lyon and with the national team, he was named to the 23-man squad that participated in UEFA Euro 2008. Despite France not living up to expectations, Toulalan was one of a few French players who started all three group stage matches.

Toulalan later became a regular selection for the national team, supplanting Rio Mavuba, Alou Diarra, and Lassana Diarra as the eventual successor to Claude Makélélé. Then manager Raymond Domenech said on many occasions that he believed Toulalan was the ideal replacement for Patrick Vieira when he was to retire from the national side. Toulalan was called up by Domenech as part of his 23-man squad for the 2010 World Cup in South Africa. However, France again failed to live up to its expectations and were again eliminated in the group stage after scoring just one goal and claiming only a single point. On 6 August 2010, Toulalan was one of five players summoned to attend a hearing held by the French Football Federation Disciplinary Committee in response to the strike which the team held at the World Cup. On 17 August, he received a one-match international ban for his part in the incident. Toulalan's suspension resulted from the player admitting that his press officer helped the players write the letter explaining their strike.

== Career statistics ==
=== Club ===
Appearances and goals by club, season and competition
Club	Season	League			National cup (Note: Includes Coupe de France, Copa del Rey)		League cup (Note: Includes Coupe de la Ligue)		Europe		Other		Total	
Club	Season	Division	Apps	Goals	Apps	Goals	Apps	Goals	Apps	Goals	Apps	Goals	Apps	Goals
Nantes	2001–02	Division 1	1	0	0	0	0	0	1 (Note: Appearance(s) in UEFA Champions League)	0	0	0	2	0
Nantes	2002–03	Ligue 1	13	0	2	0	2	0	—		—		17	0
Nantes	2003–04	Ligue 1	20	0	3	0	2	0	—		—		25	0
Nantes	2004–05	Ligue 1	31	1	2	1	2	0	—		—		35	2
Nantes	2005–06	Ligue 1	29	0	5	0	2	0	—		—		36	0
Nantes	Total		94	1	12	1	8	0	1	0	—		115	2
Lyon	2006–07	Ligue 1	32	0	1	0	4	0	7	0	1 (Note: Appearance in Trophée des Champions)	0	45	0
Lyon	2007–08	Ligue 1	30	0	4	0	1	0	5	0	1	0	41	0
Lyon	2008–09	Ligue 1	33	0	2	0	0	0	8	0	1	0	44	0
Lyon	2009–10	Ligue 1	31	0	1	0	2	1	11	0	—		45	1
Lyon	2010–11	Ligue 1	28	0	2	0	0	0	4	0	—		34	0
Lyon	Total		154	0	10	0	7	1	35	0	3	0	209	1
Málaga	2011–12	La Liga	25	3	4	0	—		—		—		29	3
Málaga	2012–13	La Liga	19	0	1	0	—		9	0	—		29	0
Málaga	Total		44	3	5	0	—		9	0	—		58	3
Monaco	2013–14	Ligue 1	29	1	4	0	1	0	—		—		34	1
Monaco	2014–15	Ligue 1	28	0	4	0	2	0	8	0	—		42	0
Monaco	2015–16	Ligue 1	25	0	1	0	1	0	9 (Note: Four appearances in UEFA Champions League, five appearances in UEFA Europa League)	0	—		36	0
Monaco	Total		82	1	9	0	4	0	17	0	—		112	1
Bordeaux	2016–17	Ligue 1	30	0	3	0	3	0	—		—		36	0
Bordeaux	2017–18	Ligue 1	21	0	1	0	1	0	2 (Note: Appearances in UEFA Europa League)	0	—		25	0
Bordeaux	Total		51	0	4	0	4	0	2	0	—		61	0
Career total			425	5	40	1	23	1	64	0	3	0	555	7

=== International ===
Appearances and goals by national team and year
National team	Year	Apps	Goals
France	2006	1	0
France	2007	8	0
France	2008	13	0
France	2009	8	0
France	2010	6	0
Total		36	0

== Honours ==
Lyon

- Ligue 1: 2006–07, 2007–08
- Coupe de France: 2007–08
- Trophée des Champions: 2006, 2007

Individual

- UNFP Ligue 1 Young Player of the Year: 2004–05
- UNFP Ligue 1 Team of the Year: 2007–08
