= Carlos Milhazes =

Portuguese footballer

Personal information
- Full name: Carlos Alberto Lourenço Milhazes
- Date of birth: 17 March 1981 (age 45)
- Place of birth: Póvoa de Varzim, Portugal
- Height: 1.82 m (5 ft 11 1/2 in)
- Position: Left-back

Youth career
- 1991–2000: Varzim

Senior career*
Years	Team	Apps	(Gls)
2000–2002	Caçadores Taipas	34	(1)
2002–2004	Varzim	47	(2)
2004–2005	Boavista	14	(0)
2005–2008	Rio Ave	76	(15)
2008–2009	Politehnica Timişoara	28	(0)
2009	→ Vitória Guimarães (loan)	10	(0)
2009–2010	Vitória Guimarães	6	(0)
2010–2011	Rio Ave	10	(1)
2011–2012	Chaves	25	(7)
2012–2013	Enosis Neon	23	(2)
2013–2015	OFI	45	(6)
2015–2017	Levadiakos	47	(2)
2017–2018	Varzim	16	(0)
Total		381	(36)
- * Club domestic league appearances and goals

Carlos Alberto Lourenço Milhazes (born 17 March 1981) is a Portuguese former professional footballer who played as a left-back.

== Playing career ==
Born in Póvoa de Varzim, Milhazes began his senior career with lowly Clube Caçadores das Taipas, later joining his hometown club Varzim S.C. (in the Segunda Liga). After appearing scarcely for Boavista F.C. in 2004–05's Primeira Liga, his first top-flight season, he signed with Rio Ave FC, experiencing both relegation and promotion.

Milhazes transferred to Romanian Liga I side FC Politehnica Timișoara in late January 2008, first on loan. After the move was made permanent, he returned to Portugal exactly one year later and signed with Vitória de Guimarães on loan until the end of the campaign, as a replacement for Jacques Momha who left for Turkey; in June 2009, he agreed to a permanent contract.

On 31 July 2010, having appeared rarely for Vitória throughout the league season, Milhazes returned to Rio Ave as a free agent. He finished his career well into his 30s, following spells with two teams in the Super League Greece as well as Varzim.

== Post-retirement ==
After retiring, Milhazes settled in Switzerland, where he worked as a carpenter. He was also involved in football at amateur level, as a striker and manager.
