= 2001 Trophée des Champions =

- Event: Trophée des Champions
Strasbourg	Nantes
1	4
- Date: 19 July 2001
- Venue: Stade de la Meinau, Strasbourg, France
- Referee: Alain Sars
- Attendance: 7,685

The 2001 Trophée des Champions was a football match held at Stade de la Meinau, Strasbourg on July 19, 2001, that saw 2000–01 Division 1 champions FC Nantes defeat 2000–01 Coupe de France winners RC Strasbourg 4–1.

== Match details ==
19 July 2001
20:45 CET

Strasbourg	1–4	Nantes
Ljuboja 17'	Report	Quint 7'; Armand 38'; Dalmat 88'; Savinaud 90'

Stade de la Meinau, Strasbourg
Attendance: 7,685
Referee: Alain Sars

GK	1	(Paraguay) José Luis Chilavert	(yellow card) 58'
CB	24	(France) Yannick Fischer
CB	5	(France) Teddy Bertin
CB	17	(Cameroon) Alexis N'Gambi
LB	4	(France) Christian Bassila
CM	8	(France) Pascal Camadini
CM	18	(France) Pascal Johansen
RW	31	(France) Péguy Luyindula		(substituted off) 74'
AM	10	(France) Corentin Martins (c)
LW	27	(Cameroon) Jacques Momha
CF	28	(Federal Republic of Yugoslavia) Danijel Ljuboja		(substituted off) 79'
Substitutes:
GK	30	(France) Christophe Eggimann
DF	3	(France) Jean-Christophe Devaux
MF	20	(France) Yacine Abdessadki
MF	21	(France) Stéphane Roda		(substituted on) 79'
FW	13	(Argentina) Gonzalo Belloso		(substituted on) 74'
Manager:
(Czech Republic) Ivan Hašek

GK	1	(France) Mickaël Landreau (c)	(yellow card) 11'
RB	3	(France) Nicolas Laspalles
CB	2	(Argentina) Néstor Fabbri
CB	5	(France) Nicolas Gillet
LB	22	(France) Sylvain Armand
DM	13	(France) Mathieu Berson	(yellow card) 36'	(substituted off) 61'
RM	8	(France) Frédéric Da Rocha
LM	21	(France) Olivier Quint
AM	29	(France) Stéphane Ziani
CF	9	(Romania) Viorel Moldovan		(substituted off) 85'
CF	11	(France) Pierre-Yves André		(substituted off) 73'
Substitutes:
DF	12	(France) Pascal Delhommeau		(substituted on) 85'
DF	24	(France) Yves Deroff
MF	14	(France) Nicolas Savinaud		(substituted on) 61'
MF	18	(France) Wilfried Dalmat		(substituted on) 73'
FW	14	(France) Pierre Aristouy
Manager:
(France) Raynald Denoueix

MATCH OFFICIALS

- Assistant referees:
  - Claude Cauvet
  - Jean-Paul Chaudre
- Fourth official: Jean-Marc Bonnin

== See also ==
- 2001–02 French Division 1
- 2001–02 Coupe de France
- 2001–02 FC Nantes season
- 2001–02 RC Strasbourg season
