= Vitry =

Vitry may refer to:

== People ==
- Odo of Vitry (died 1158), French nobleman
- Jacques de Vitry (c. 1160–1240), French chronicler and cardinal
- Raoul de Vitry (1895–1977), French aristocrat and business executive
- Henryk Vitry, pen name of Tadeusz Żakiej (1915–1994), Polish food writer
- Philippe de Vitry (1291–1361), French composer, music theorist and poet
- Simhah ben Samuel of Vitry (died 1105), French Talmudist and the compiler of the Mahzor Vitry

== Communes in France ==
=== Haute-Marne departement ===
- Vitry-en-Montagne
- Vitry-lès-Nogent

=== Marne departement ===
- Vitry-en-Perthois
- Vitry-la-Ville
- Vitry-le-François

=== Saône-et-Loire departement ===
- Vitry-en-Charollais
- Vitry-lès-Cluny
- Vitry-sur-Loire

=== In other departements ===
- Vitry-aux-Loges, in the Loiret departement
- Vitry-en-Artois, in the Pas-de-Calais departement
- Vitry-Laché, in the Nièvre departement
- Vitry-le-Croisé, in the Aube departement
- Vitry-sur-Orne, in the Moselle departement
- Vitry-sur-Seine, in the Val-de-Marne departement

== Other uses ==
- Simhah ben Samuel of Vitry (the Mahzor Vitry), a Jewish prayer book manuscript of the early 12th century, attributed to Rabbi Simhah ben Samuel of Vitry

== See also ==
- Vitré (disambiguation)
- De Vitre (disambiguation)
