= Donzy (disambiguation) =

Donzy may refer to:

- Donzy, a commune in Nièvre department, Bourgogne region, France
- Donzy-le-Pertuis, a commune in Saône-et-Loire department, Bourgogne region, France
- Donzy-le-National, a commune in Saône-et-Loire department, Bourgogne region, France
