= RC Strasbourg Alsace in European football =

French club in European football

- Club: RC Strasbourg Alsace
- Seasons played: 14
- First entry: 1961–62 Inter-Cities Fairs Cup
- Latest entry: 2025–26 UEFA Conference League

Titles
- Intertoto Cup: 1 (1995)

RC Strasbourg Alsace is a French professional association football club founded in 1906 and based in the city of Strasbourg, Alsace. The club's involvement in international competitions dates back to the 1960s and won their only European title in 1995, defeating Tirol Innsbruck to win the UEFA Intertoto Cup.

== Matches ==
All results (home, away, and aggregate) list RC Strasbourg's goal tally first.

Colour key

Wins
Draws
Losses
Semi-final won

RC Strasbourg results in European competitions
Season	Competition	Round	Opposition	Home	Away	Aggregate	Notes	Ref.
1961–62	Inter-Cities Fairs Cup	First round	(Hungary) MTK	1–3	2–10	3–13	(Note: The first leg was played at home, and the second leg was played away.)	
1964–65	Inter-Cities Fairs Cup	First round	(Italy) Milan	2–0	0–1	2–1		
1964–65	Inter-Cities Fairs Cup	Second round	(Switzerland) Basel	5–2	1–0	6–2	(Note: The first leg was played away, and the second leg was played at home.)	
1964–65	Inter-Cities Fairs Cup	Third round	(Spain) Barcelona	0–0	2–2	2–2	0–0 (Note: Extra time was necessary for this match.) (Note: This playoff match was played away at Camp Nou and won on coin toss.)	
1964–65	Inter-Cities Fairs Cup	Quarter-final	(England) Manchester United	0–5	0–0	0–5		
1965–66	Inter-Cities Fairs Cup	First round	(Italy) Milan	2–1	0–1	2–2	1–1 (Note: This playoff match was played away at San Siro and lost on coin toss.)	
1966–67	Intertoto Cup	Group stage (Group A2)	(Italy) Atalanta	1–2	1–6	4th of 4	(Note: The first match was played at home, and the fourth match was played away.)	
1966–67	Intertoto Cup	Group stage (Group A2)	(Netherlands) DWS	1–2	1–4	4th of 4	(Note: The second match was played away, and the third match was played at home.)	
1966–67	Intertoto Cup	Group stage (Group A2)	(Switzerland) Grenchen	3–2	2–4	4th of 4	(Note: The fifth match was played away, and the sixth match was played at home.)	
1966–67	European Cup Winners' Cup	First round	(Romania) Steaua București	1–0	1–1	2–1		
1966–67	European Cup Winners' Cup	Second round	(Bulgaria) Slavia Sofia	1–0	0–2	1–2		
1967–68	Intertoto Cup	Group stage (Group A2)	(Netherlands) Feyenoord	1–3	0–3	3rd of 4		
1967–68	Intertoto Cup	Group stage (Group A2)	(Belgium) RDC Molenbeek	3–1	0–0	3rd of 4		
1967–68	Intertoto Cup	Group stage (Group A2)	(Switzerland) Lausanne-Sports	0–2	2–2	3rd of 4	(Note: The fifth match was played at home, and the sixth match was played away.)	
1978–79	UEFA Cup	First round	(Sweden) Elfsborg	4–1	0–2	4–3		
1978–79	UEFA Cup	Second round	(Scotland) Hibernian	2–0	0–1	2–1		
1978–79	UEFA Cup	Third round	(Germany) MSV Duisburg	0–0	0–4	0–4		
1979–80	European Cup	First round	(Norway) Start	4–0	2–1	6–1		
1979–80	European Cup	Second round	(Czechoslovakia) Dukla Prague	2–0	0–1	2–1	(Note: Extra time was necessary for the home match.)	
1979–80	European Cup	Quarter-final	(Netherlands) Ajax	0–0	0–4	0–4		
1995–96	UEFA Intertoto Cup	Group stage (Group 11)	(Turkey) Gençlerbirliği	4–1		1st of 5	(Note: The match was played at home.)	
1995–96	UEFA Intertoto Cup	Group stage (Group 11)	(Malta) Floriana	4–0		1st of 5	(Note: The match was played away.)	
1995–96	UEFA Intertoto Cup	Group stage (Group 11)	(Austria) Tirol Innsbruck	4–0		1st of 5		
1995–96	UEFA Intertoto Cup	Group stage (Group 11)	(Israel) Hapoel Petah Tikva	0–0		1st of 5		
1995–96	UEFA Intertoto Cup	Round of 16	(Austria) Vorwärts Steyr	4–0				
1995–96	UEFA Intertoto Cup	Quarter-final	(France) Metz	2–0				
1995–96	UEFA Intertoto Cup	Semi-final	(Austria) Tirol Innsbruck	6–1	1–1	7–2		
1995–96	UEFA Cup	First round	(Hungary) Újpest	3–0	2–0	5–0		
1995–96	UEFA Cup	Second round	(Italy) Milan	0–1	1–2	1–3		
1996–97	UEFA Intertoto Cup	Group stage (Group 11)	(Turkey) Kocaelispor	1–1		3rd of 5		
1996–97	UEFA Intertoto Cup	Group stage (Group 11)	(Malta) Hibernians	2–0		3rd of 5		
1996–97	UEFA Intertoto Cup	Group stage (Group 11)	(Russia) Ural Yekaterinburg	1–1		3rd of 5		
1996–97	UEFA Intertoto Cup	Group stage (Group 11)	(Bulgaria) CSKA Sofia	0–0		3rd of 5		
1997–98	UEFA Cup	First round	(Scotland) Rangers	2–1	2–1	4–2		
1997–98	UEFA Cup	Second round	(England) Liverpool	3–0	0–2	3–2		
1997–98	UEFA Cup	Third round	(Italy) Inter Milan	2–0	0–3	2–3		
2001–02	UEFA Cup	First round	(Belgium) Standard Liège	2–2	0–2	2–4		
2005–06	UEFA Cup	First round	(Austria) GAK	5–0	2–0	7–0		
2005–06	UEFA Cup	Group stage (Group E)	(Switzerland) Basel	2–0		1st of 5		
2005–06	UEFA Cup	Group stage (Group E)	(Norway) Tromsø	2–0		1st of 5		
2005–06	UEFA Cup	Group stage (Group E)	(Italy) Roma	1–1		1st of 5		
2005–06	UEFA Cup	Group stage (Group E)	(Serbia and Montenegro) Red Star Belgrade	2–2		1st of 5		
2005–06	UEFA Cup	Round of 32	(Bulgaria) Litex Lovech	0–0	2–0	2–0		
2005–06	UEFA Cup	Round of 16	(Switzerland) Basel	2–2	0–2	2–4		
2019–20	UEFA Europa League	Second qualifying round	(Israel) Maccabi Haifa	3–1	1–2	4–3		
2019–20	UEFA Europa League	Third qualifying round	(Bulgaria) Lokomotiv Plovdiv	1–0	1–0	2–0		
2019–20	UEFA Europa League	Play-off round	(Germany) Eintracht Frankfurt	1–0	0–3	1–3		
2025–26	UEFA Conference League	Play-off round	(Denmark) Brøndby	0–0	3–2	3–2		
2025–26	UEFA Conference League	League phase	(Slovakia) Slovan Bratislava	2–1		1st of 36		
2025–26	UEFA Conference League	League phase	(Poland) Jagiellonia Białystok	1–1		1st of 36		
2025–26	UEFA Conference League	League phase	(Sweden) BK Häcken	2–1		1st of 36		
2025–26	UEFA Conference League	League phase	(England) Crystal Palace	2–1		1st of 36		
2025–26	UEFA Conference League	League phase	(Scotland) Aberdeen	1–0		1st of 36		
2025–26	UEFA Conference League	League phase	(Iceland) Breiðablik	3–1		1st of 36		
2025–26	UEFA Conference League	Round of 16	(Croatia) Rijeka	1–1	2–1	3–2		
2025–26	UEFA Conference League	Quarter-final	(Germany) Mainz 05	4–0	0–2	4–2		
2025–26	UEFA Conference League	Semi-final	(Spain) Rayo Vallecano	0–1	0–1	0–2		

== Overall record ==
Accurate as of 7 May 2026.

Including matches in European Cup, UEFA Cup / UEFA Europa League, European Cup Winners' Cup, Intertoto Cup / UEFA Intertoto Cup, Inter-Cities Fairs Cup, and each competition's associated qualifying rounds.

Colour key

Positive balance (more wins)
Neutral balance (equal W/L ratio)
Negative balance (more losses)

=== By competition ===
RC Strasbourg record in European football by competition
Competition	Apps	Games	Wins	Draws	Losses	GF	GA	GD	Win%
European Cup	1	6	3	1	2	8	6	+2	50.00
UEFA Cup / UEFA Europa League	6	34	17	6	11	48	35	+13	50.00
UEFA Conference League	1	14	8	3	3	21	13	+8	57.14
European Cup Winners' Cup	1	4	2	1	1	3	3	+0	50.00
Intertoto Cup / UEFA Intertoto Cup	4	24	9	7	8	44	36	+8	37.50
Inter-Cities Fairs Cup	3	14	4	5	5	16	26	−10	28.57
Total	16	96	43	23	30	140	119	+21	44.79

=== By country ===
RC Strasbourg record in European football by country
Country	Pld	W	D	L	GF	GA	GD	Win%
Austria	6	5	1	0	22	2	+20	83.33
Belgium	4	1	2	1	5	5	+0	25.00
Bulgaria	7	4	2	1	5	2	+3	57.14
Croatia	2	1	1	0	3	2	+1	50.00
Czech Republic (Note: Includes Czechoslovakia.)	2	1	0	1	2	1	+1	50.00
Denmark	2	1	1	0	3	2	+1	50.00
England	5	2	1	2	5	8	−3	40.00
France	1	1	0	0	2	0	+2	100.00
Germany	6	2	1	3	5	9	−4	33.33
Hungary	4	2	0	2	8	13	−5	50.00
Iceland	1	1	0	0	3	1	+2	100.00
Israel	3	1	1	1	4	3	+1	33.33
Italy	12	3	2	7	11	19	−8	25.00
Malta	2	2	0	0	6	0	+6	100.00
Netherlands	6	0	1	5	3	16	−13	0.00
Norway	3	3	0	0	8	1	+7	100.00
Poland	1	0	1	0	1	1	+0	0.00
Romania	2	1	1	0	2	1	+1	50.00
Russia	1	0	1	0	1	1	+0	0.00
Scotland	5	4	0	1	7	3	+4	80.00
Serbia (Note: Includes Serbia and Montenegro.)	1	0	1	0	2	2	+0	0.00
Slovakia	1	1	0	0	2	1	+1	100.00
Spain	5	0	3	2	2	4	−2	0.00
Sweden	3	2	0	1	6	4	+2	66.67
Switzerland	9	4	2	3	17	16	+1	44.44
Turkey	2	1	1	0	5	2	+3	50.00
Total (26 countries)	96	43	23	30	140	119	+21	44.79

=== By team ===
RC Strasbourg record in European football by team
Team	Country	Pld	W	D	L	GF	GA	GD	Win%
Aberdeen	Scotland	1	1	0	0	1	0	+1	100.00
Ajax	Netherlands	2	0	1	1	0	4	−4	0.00
Atalanta	Italy	2	0	0	2	2	8	−6	0.00
Barcelona	Spain	3	0	3	0	2	2	+0	0.00
Basel	Switzerland	5	3	1	1	10	6	+4	60.00
Breiðablik	Iceland	1	1	0	0	3	1	+2	100.00
Brøndby	Denmark	2	1	1	0	3	2	+1	50.00
Crystal Palace	England	1	1	0	0	2	1	+1	100.00
CSKA Sofia	Bulgaria	1	0	1	0	0	0	+0	0.00
Duisburg	Germany	2	0	1	1	0	4	−4	0.00
Dukla Prague	Czech Republic	2	1	0	1	2	1	+1	50.00
DWS	Netherlands	2	0	0	2	2	6	−4	0.00
Eintracht Frankfurt	Germany	2	1	0	1	1	3	−2	50.00
Elfsborg	Sweden	2	1	0	1	4	3	+1	50.00
Feyenoord	Netherlands	2	0	0	2	1	6	−5	0.00
Floriana	Malta	1	1	0	0	4	0	+4	100.00
Gençlerbirliği	Turkey	1	1	0	0	4	1	+3	100.00
Grazer AK	Austria	2	2	0	0	7	0	+7	100.00
Grenchen	Switzerland	2	1	0	1	5	6	−1	50.00
Hapoel Petah Tikva	Israel	1	0	1	0	0	0	+0	0.00
Häcken	Sweden	1	1	0	0	2	1	+1	100.00
Hibernian	Scotland	2	1	0	1	2	1	+1	50.00
Hibernians	Malta	1	1	0	0	2	0	+2	100.00
Inter Milan	Italy	2	1	0	1	2	3	−1	50.00
Jagiellonia Białystok	Poland	1	0	1	0	1	1	+0	0.00
Kocaelispor	Turkey	1	0	1	0	1	1	+0	0.00
Lausanne-Sport	Switzerland	2	0	1	1	2	4	−2	0.00
Litex Lovech	Bulgaria	2	1	1	0	2	0	+2	50.00
Liverpool	England	2	1	0	1	3	2	+1	50.00
Lokomotiv Plovdiv	Bulgaria	2	2	0	0	2	0	+2	100.00
Maccabi Haifa	Israel	2	1	0	1	4	3	+1	50.00
Mainz 05	Germany	2	1	0	1	4	2	+2	50.00
Metz	France	1	1	0	0	2	0	+2	100.00
Milan	Italy	7	2	1	4	6	7	−1	28.57
MTK Budapest	Hungary	2	0	0	2	3	13	−10	0.00
Manchester United	England	2	0	1	1	0	5	−5	0.00
Rangers	Scotland	2	2	0	0	4	2	+2	100.00
Rayo Vallecano	Spain	2	0	0	2	0	2	−2	0.00
RDC Molenbeek	Belgium	2	1	1	0	3	1	+2	50.00
Red Star Belgrade	Serbia	1	0	1	0	2	2	+0	0.00
Rijeka	Croatia	2	1	1	0	3	2	+1	50.00
Roma	Italy	1	0	1	0	1	1	+0	0.00
Slavia Sofia	Bulgaria	2	1	0	1	1	2	−1	50.00
Slovan Bratislava	Slovakia	1	1	0	0	2	1	+1	100.00
Standard Liège	Belgium	2	0	1	1	2	4	−2	0.00
Start	Norway	2	2	0	0	6	1	+5	100.00
Steaua București	Romania	2	1	1	0	2	1	+1	50.00
Tirol Innsbruck	Austria	3	2	1	0	11	2	+9	66.67
Tromsø	Norway	1	1	0	0	2	0	+2	100.00
Ural Yekaterinburg	Russia	1	0	1	0	1	1	+0	0.00
Újpest	Hungary	2	2	0	0	5	0	+5	100.00
Vorwärts Steyr	Austria	1	1	0	0	4	0	+4	100.00
Total (52 teams)	26 countries	96	43	23	30	140	119	+21	44.79
