= Massy =

Massy may refer to:

== People ==
- Annie Massy (1867–1931), Irish marine biologist and ornithologist
- Arnaud Massy, French professional golfer
- Baron Massy in the Peerage of Ireland
- George Godfrey Massy Wheeler V.C.
- Hugh Massy (British Army officer), Lieutenant General Hugh Royds Stokes Massy, British Army General
- Montagu Massy-Westropp, Australian rugby union player
- Pierre Massy, Dutch footballer
- R. H. Massy-Westropp, Irish rugby union player
- Sylvia Massy, American entrepreneur, record producer

== Places ==
- Massy, Essonne, a commune in the Essonne department, France
- Massy, Saône-et-Loire, a commune in the Saône-et-Loire department, France
- Massy, Seine-Maritime, a commune in the Seine-Maritime department, France
- Massy, Kyrgyzstan, village in Nooken District, Jalal-Abad Province, Kyrgyzstan
