= Vitré =

Vitré may refer to the following places in France:

- Vitré, Ille-et-Vilaine
- Vitré, Deux-Sèvres

== See also ==
- De Vitre (disambiguation)
- Vitry (disambiguation)
