= Alexis N'Gambi =

Cameroonian footballer (born 1982)

Personal information
- Full name: Alexis N'Gambi
- Date of birth: 20 January 1982 (age 44)
- Place of birth: Esaka, Cameroon
- Height: 1.84 m (6 ft 0 in)
- Position: Defender

Youth career
- Kadji Sports Academy

Senior career*
Years	Team	Apps	(Gls)
1999–2002	Strasbourg B	50	(1)
2001–2003	Strasbourg	0	(0)
2002–2003	→ Gueugnon (loan)	26	(0)
2003–2005	Gueugnon	67	(0)
2005–2008	Montpellier	73	(3)
2008	Partizan	2	(0)
2009	Daugava	6	(0)
2009	Panthrakikos	6	(0)
Total		230	(4)

International career
2001	Cameroon U21		
2003	Cameroon U23		
2008	Cameroon	1	(0)
- * Club domestic league appearances and goals

Alexis N'Gambi (born 20 January 1982) is a Cameroonian former professional footballer who played as a defender.

== Club career ==
After starting out at the Kadji Sports Academy in his native country, N'Gambi moved to France and signed with Strasbourg in 1999. He spent three seasons with the club's B team, failing to make any league appearances for the senior side. However, N'Gambi made his official debut for Strasbourg in the 2001 Trophée des Champions, playing the entire match as the team lost 1–4 to Nantes.

In the summer of 2002, N'Gambi was loaned to Ligue 2 club Gueugnon. He eventually signed for the club on a permanent basis in 2003. After two more seasons there, N'Gambi switched to fellow league club Montpellier. He was a regular member of the team's defensive line over the following three years, making 73 league appearances and scoring three goals.

In June 2008, N'Gambi agreed transfer to Serbian club Partizan, on a three-year contract. He struggled to make an impression at the club, appearing in only two league games, before being released in the 2009 winter transfer window. Shortly after, N'Gambi joined Latvian club Daugava. He switched clubs and countries again in July 2009, this time joining Greek club Panthrakikos.

In early 2010, N'Gambi was linked with Romanian club Astra Ploiești, but the deal never went through. He was then linked with Malaysian side Sarawak FA in late 2011, again without official confirmation.

== International career ==
In March 2001, N'Gambi was selected to represent Cameroon at the 2001 African Youth Championship. He also played for the Cameroon U23s, as they failed to qualify for the 2004 Summer Olympics.

N'Gambi earned one full international cap for his country on 19 November 2008, in a 2–3 friendly loss to South Africa.

== Honours ==
Strasbourg

- Trophée des Champions: Runner-up 2001
