= La Vineuse =

Commune in Saône-et-Loire, France

- Part of La Vineuse sur Fregande
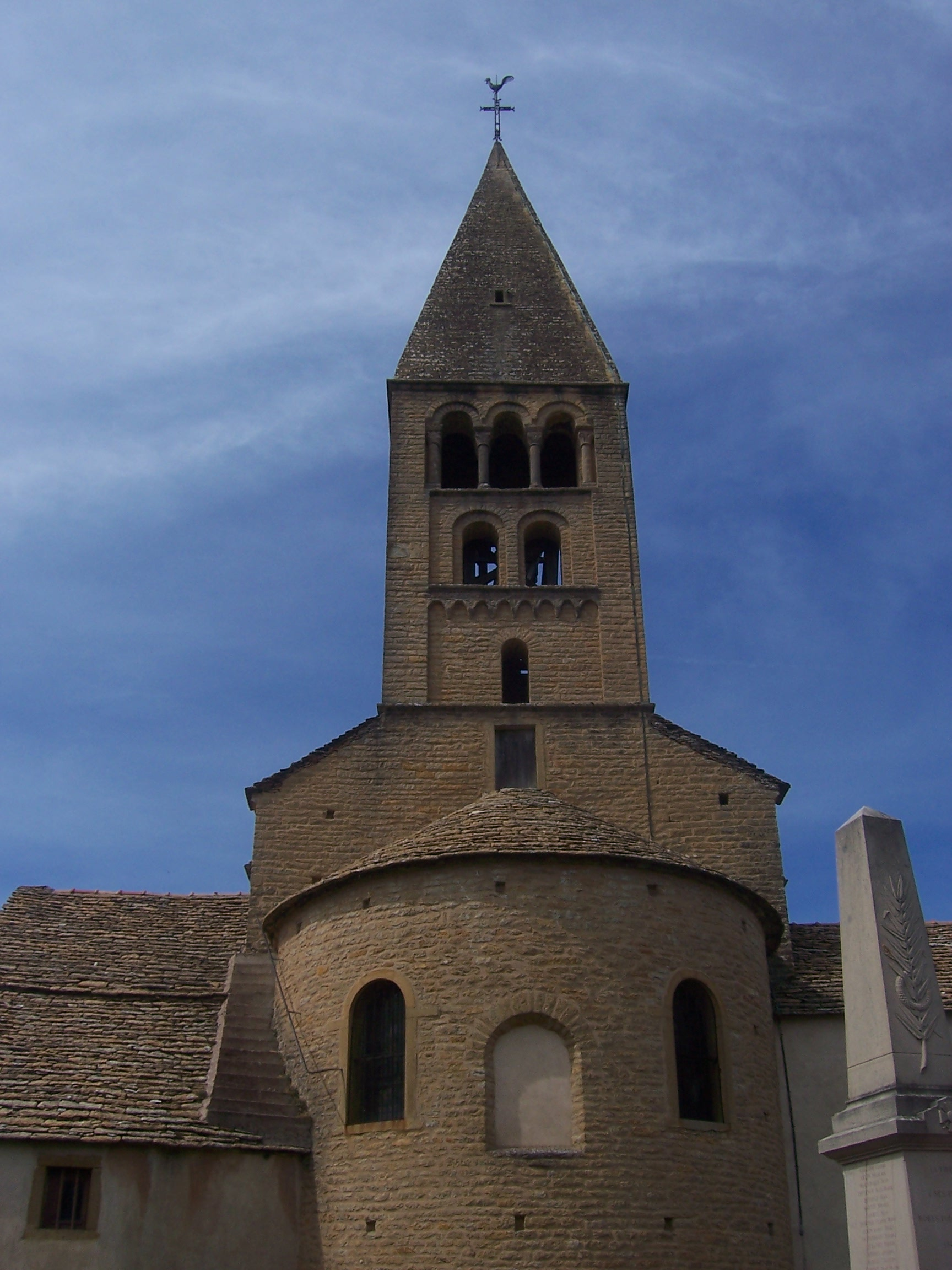
- Location of La Vineuse
- Location within France Location within Bourgogne-Franche-Comté
- Coordinates: 46°28′19″N 4°35′54″E
- Country: France
- Region: Bourgogne-Franche-Comté
- Department: Saône-et-Loire
- Arrondissement: Mâcon
- Canton: Cluny
- Commune: La Vineuse sur Fregande
- Area^{1}: 15.75 km^{2} (6.08 sq mi)
- Elevation: 412 m (1,352 ft)
- Highest elevation: 540 m (1,770 ft)
- Lowest elevation: 240 m (790 ft)
- Population (2022): 295
  - Density: 18.7/km^{2} (48.5/sq mi)
- Time zone: UTC+01:00 (CET)
  - Summer (DST): UTC+02:00 (CEST)
- Postal code: 71250
- ^{1} French Land Register data, which excludes lakes, ponds, glaciers > 1 km^{2} (0.386 sq mi or 247 acres) and river estuaries.

La Vineuse is a former commune in the Saône-et-Loire department in the region of Bourgogne-Franche-Comté in eastern France. On 1 January 2017, it was merged into the new commune La Vineuse sur Fregande.

== See also ==
- Communes of the Saône-et-Loire department
