= La Vineuse sur Fregande =

- Commune
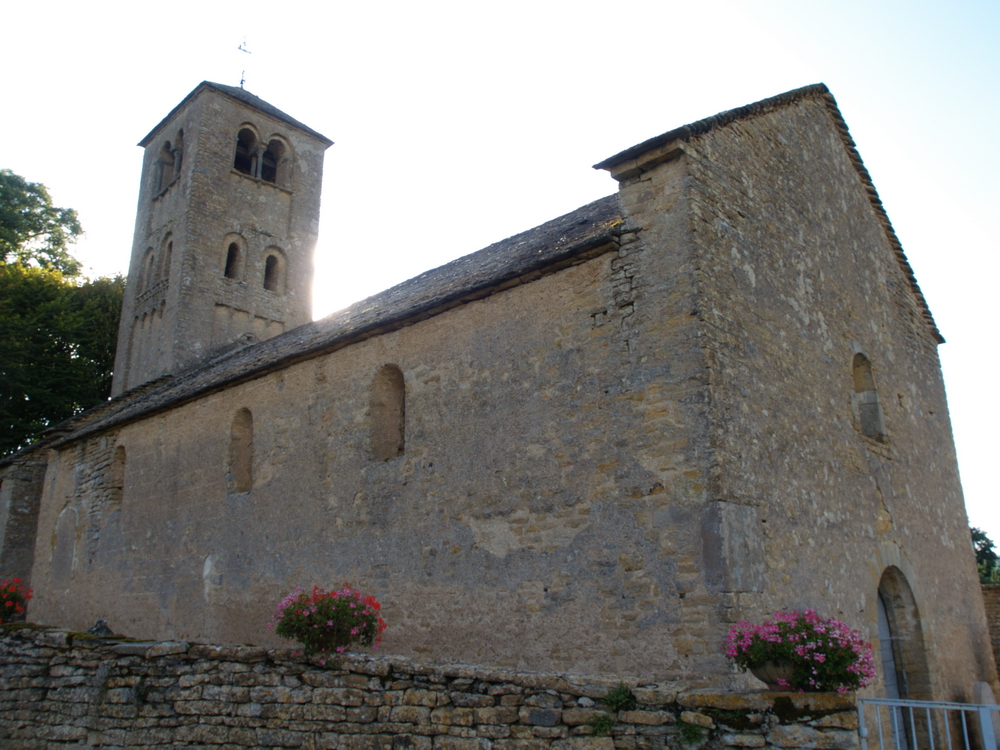
- The church in Massy
- Location of La Vineuse sur Fregande
- Location within France Location within Bourgogne-Franche-Comté
- Coordinates: 46°28′19″N 4°35′53″E
- Country: France
- Region: Bourgogne-Franche-Comté
- Department: Saône-et-Loire
- Arrondissement: Mâcon
- Canton: Cluny
- Intercommunality: Clunisois

Government
  - Mayor (2020–2026): François Bonnetain
- Area^{1}: 35.81 km^{2} (13.83 sq mi)
- Population (2023): 648
  - Density: 18.1/km^{2} (46.9/sq mi)
- Time zone: UTC+01:00 (CET)
  - Summer (DST): UTC+02:00 (CEST)
- INSEE/Postal code: 71582 /71250
- ^{1} French Land Register data, which excludes lakes, ponds, glaciers > 1 km^{2} (0.386 sq mi or 247 acres) and river estuaries.

La Vineuse sur Fregande is a commune in the department of Saône-et-Loire, eastern France. The municipality was established on 1 January 2017 by merger of the former communes of La Vineuse (the seat), Donzy-le-National, Massy and Vitry-lès-Cluny.

== See also ==
- Communes of the Saône-et-Loire department
