= De Vitre =

De Vitre, De Vitré or Devitre may refer to:

== People with the surname ==
- Edward Denis de Vitre (1806–1878), English physician
- François Martin de Vitré (17th century), French sailor and adventurer
- Ayesha Devitre, screenwriter of the 2012 film Ek Main Aur Ekk Tu
- Mark DeVitre, executive vice-president of Entertainment Studios

== Places connected with the city of Vitré, France ==
- Château de Vitré, a castle
- Gare de Vitré, a railway station

== See also ==
- Vitry (disambiguation)
- Vitré (disambiguation)
