= Sylvain Armand =

French footballer (born 1980)

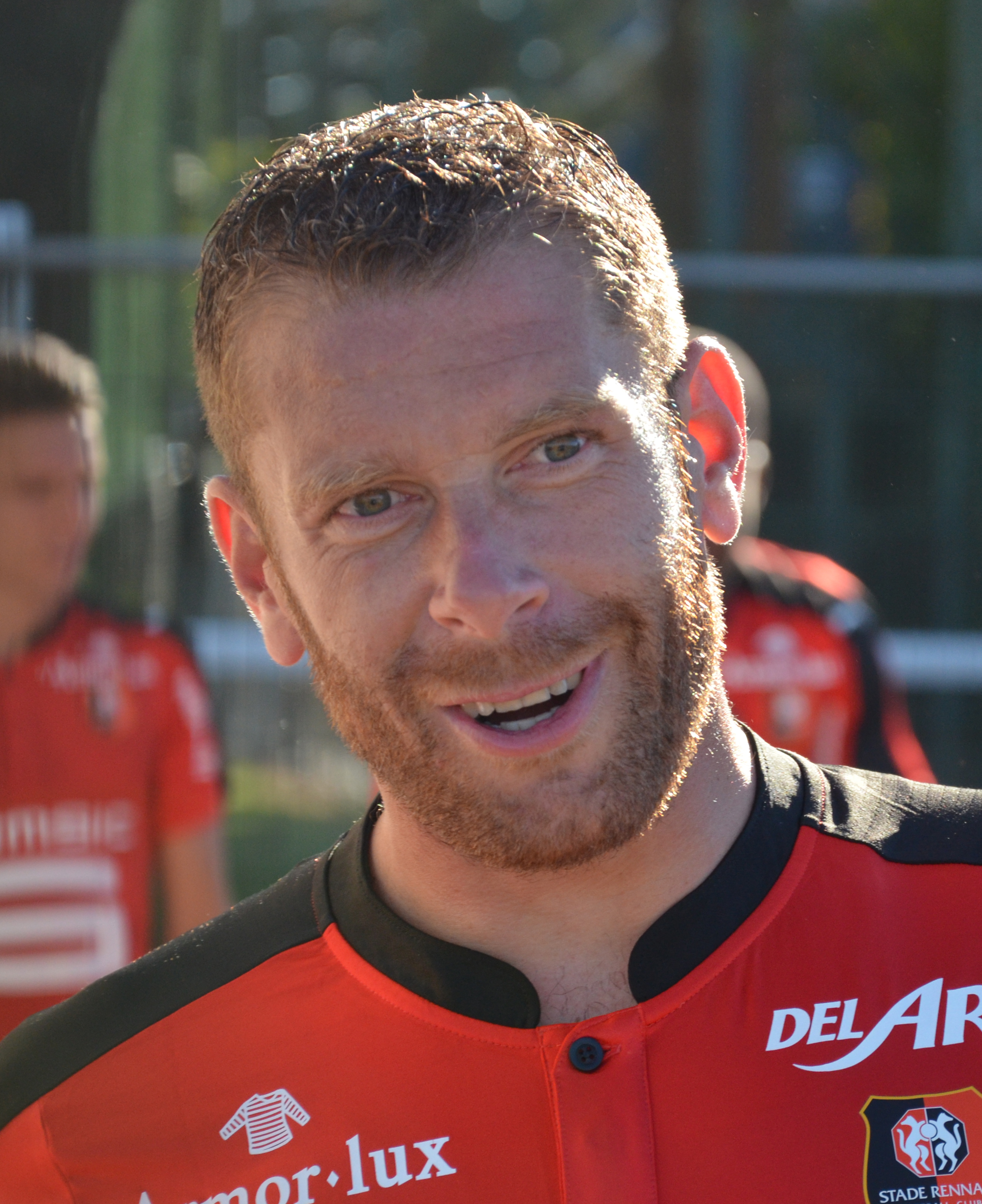
- Armand in 2016

Personal information
- Date of birth: 1 August 1980 (age 46)
- Place of birth: Saint-Étienne, France
- Height: 1.82 m (6 ft 0 in)
- Position: Left-back

Youth career
- 1996–1999: Saint-Étienne

Senior career*
Years	Team	Apps	(Gls)
1999–2000	Clermont	28	(1)
2000–2004	Nantes	118	(7)
2004–2013	Paris Saint-Germain	285	(10)
2013–2017	Rennes	103	(2)
Total		534	(20)
- * Club domestic league appearances and goals

Sylvain Armand (born 1 August 1980) is a French former professional footballer who played as a left-back for Rennes, Paris Saint-Germain, Nantes, and Clermont.

== Career ==
Born in Saint-Étienne, Loire, Armand started playing youth team football for AS Saint-Étienne in 1994. He wasn't retained for the club's senior squad and thus moved to Clermont Foot in 1999, where he received his professional debut.

=== Nantes ===
In 2000, having impressed with his performances in Clermont, he switched to top-flight club FC Nantes. He staged his first appearance in Division 1 during the match between AJ Auxerre in Nantes (2–2) 9 September 2000. In a fairytale ending, he won the 2001 Division1 1 championship in his very first season with the "Canaris". He also scored as Nantes won the 2001 Trophée des Champions. The following three seasons were much less successful. He is also the author of a memorable goal in the UEFA Champions League against Lazio in 2001–02, following a lonely run on the left flank.

=== Paris Saint-Germain ===
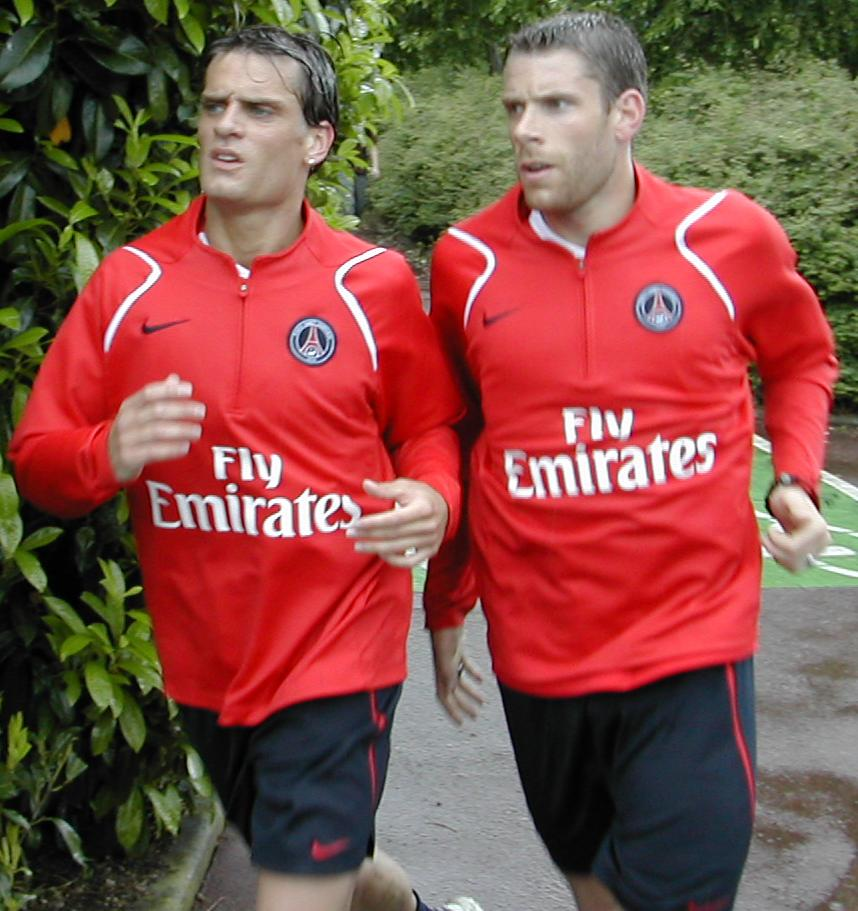
Armand training alongside Jérôme Rothen in 2010

In 2004, Armand and Nantes teammate Mario Yepes both moved to Paris Saint-Germain for approximately $5 million. After a very difficult season for PSG, Armand took part in the victory of PSG in the Coupe de France in the April 2006 final against Olympique de Marseille. He was then voted best player in the Paris squad for the 2006–07 season following an impressive season, including a very important goal against RC Lens. At the start of the 2006–07 season, Armand signed a two-year extension with the club, keeping him at the club until 2010.

In 2007–08, Armand lost his starting spot status for a game against Valenciennes FC in favour of youngster Mamadou Sakho, who also became the youngest captain in the history of the PSG at the age of 17. Armand then gradually regained his best form, game after game. He provided two consecutive assists, both to Amara Diané, against Lens in Ligue 1 (3–0) then against Valenciennes in the Coupe de la Ligue (4–0) three days later. Rarely injured and suspended, he missed only eight domestic league games between 2004 and 2008, all the while playing in different positions on the pitch, including left-back, centre-back, defensive midfield, and left midfield.

With PSG, Armand won the 2006 and 2010 Coupe de France and the 2008 Coupe de la Ligue. The club's league performances were much less satisfactory, with a series of mid-and low-table finishes between 2004 and 2008. Even in the club's worst seasons, between 2006 and 2008, Armand established himself as a reliable performer and remained loyal to Paris Saint-Germain in spite of interest from other French clubs. During this barren spell, he formed an efficient partnership on the left flank with Jérôme Rothen, and they were a major revelation in an otherwise disappointing Parisian side. In July 2009, Armand signed a three-year contract, keeping him at the club until 2012.

After the arrival of new coach Antoine Kombouaré in 2009, Armand was deployed in positions other than left-back, playing in central defence and even as a defensive midfielder when needed. On 17 April 2011, he reached a new landmark when he participated in his 319th game for PSG, thus overtaking legendary goalkeeper Bernard Lama's record. In September 2011, Armand signed a one-year extension with the club, lasting until 2013.

After Carlo Ancelotti replaced the sacked Antoine Kombouaré, Armand struggled to remain a regular starter, especially after the influx of new players brought in by the club's wealthy new Qatari owners, led by Nasser Al-Khelaifi. Although he thought about leaving the team at the end of the season, he chose to remain with PSG for the 2012–13 season in the hope of finally winning the French championship. Armand made his 400th appearance for the club in Le Classique against Marseille, as PSG won 2–0.

On 12 May 2013, two games before the end of the season, PSG secured their third Ligue 1 champions title, 19 years after their last championship win and nine years after Armand's arrival in the club. Armand then quoted:

"We really wanted to win tonight to celebrate the title and we did that. Tonight we are truly champions, here with our supporters. I've been waiting for nine years for this title. I am honoured, and also proud. It also a very emotional night because, for the last week, we have been waiting to say thank-you to all our supporters, who have been here with us through thick and thin. Tonight was the crowning moment, the reward for all the hard work it took to win the championship for Paris and it is exceptional."

In the last game of the season, against FC Lorient, Armand was given the captaincy armband in his last PSG appearance as part of a farewell gesture. At the time of his departure, Armand was the club's longest-serving player and he has been given the nickname "Mr. PSG."

=== Rennes ===
On 3 June 2013, Armand joined Rennes on a free transfer, signing a contract with the club lasting until 2015. Armand was previously linked with a move back to FC Nantes. On 1 July, Armand was officially presented by the club.

On 14 January 2017, Armand announced he would end his career at the end of the season.

== Post-playing career ==
In July 2017, following his retirement as a player, Armand was appointed deputy of Rennes' director of recruitment Jean-Luc Buisine.

== Career statistics ==
=== Club ===
Appearances and goals by club, season and competition
Club	Season	League			Coupe de France		Coupe de la Ligue		Continental		Total	
Club	Season	Division	Apps	Goals	Apps	Goals	Apps	Goals	Apps	Goals	Apps	Goals
Clermont	1999–2000	Championnat National	28	1	—		—		—		28	1
Nantes Atlantique	2000–01	Division 1	23	2	4	0	2	0	6 (Note: Appearances in UEFA Cup)	1	35	3
Nantes Atlantique	2001–02	Division 1	30	1	1	1	0	0	11 (Note: Appearances in UEFA Champions League)	1	42	3
Nantes Atlantique	2002–03	Ligue 1	30	1	2	0	3	1	—		35	2
Nantes Atlantique	2003–04	Ligue 1	35	3	5	0	4	0	—		44	3
Nantes Atlantique	Total		118	7	12	1	9	1	17	2	156	11
Paris Saint-Germain	2004–05	Ligue 1	37	1	3	0	1	0	6	0	47	1
Paris Saint-Germain	2005–06	Ligue 1	35	0	6	1	2	0	—		43	1
Paris Saint-Germain	2006–07	Ligue 1	37	2	4	0	2	0	8	0	51	2
Paris Saint-Germain	2007–08	Ligue 1	35	2	6	1	5	0	—		46	3
Paris Saint-Germain	2008–09	Ligue 1	35	0	3	0	4	0	11	0	53	0
Paris Saint-Germain	2009–10	Ligue 1	33	2	5	0	0	0	—		38	2
Paris Saint-Germain	2010–11	Ligue 1	33	2	3	0	3	0	6 (Note: Appearances in UEFA Europa League)	0	45	2
Paris Saint-Germain	2011–12	Ligue 1	22	1	3	0	1	0	5	0	31	1
Paris Saint-Germain	2012–13	Ligue 1	18	0	2	0	1	0	2	0	23	0
Paris Saint-Germain	Total		285	10	35	2	19	0	38	0	377	12
Rennes	2013–14	Ligue 1	32	0	6	0	1	0	—		39	0
Rennes	2014–15	Ligue 1	36	1	3	1	3	2	—		42	4
Rennes	2015–16	Ligue 1	34	1	2	1	1	0	—		37	2
Rennes	2016–17	Ligue 1	1	0	0	0	2	0	—		3	0
Rennes	Total		103	2	11	2	7	2	0	0	121	6
Career total			534	20	58	5	35	3	55	2	682	30

== Honours ==
Nantes

- Division 1: 2000–01
- Trophée des Champions: 2001

Paris Saint-Germain

- Ligue 1: 2012–13
- Coupe de France: 2005–06, 2009–10
- Coupe de la Ligue: 2007–08
