= Vitry-lès-Cluny =

- Part of La Vineuse sur Fregande
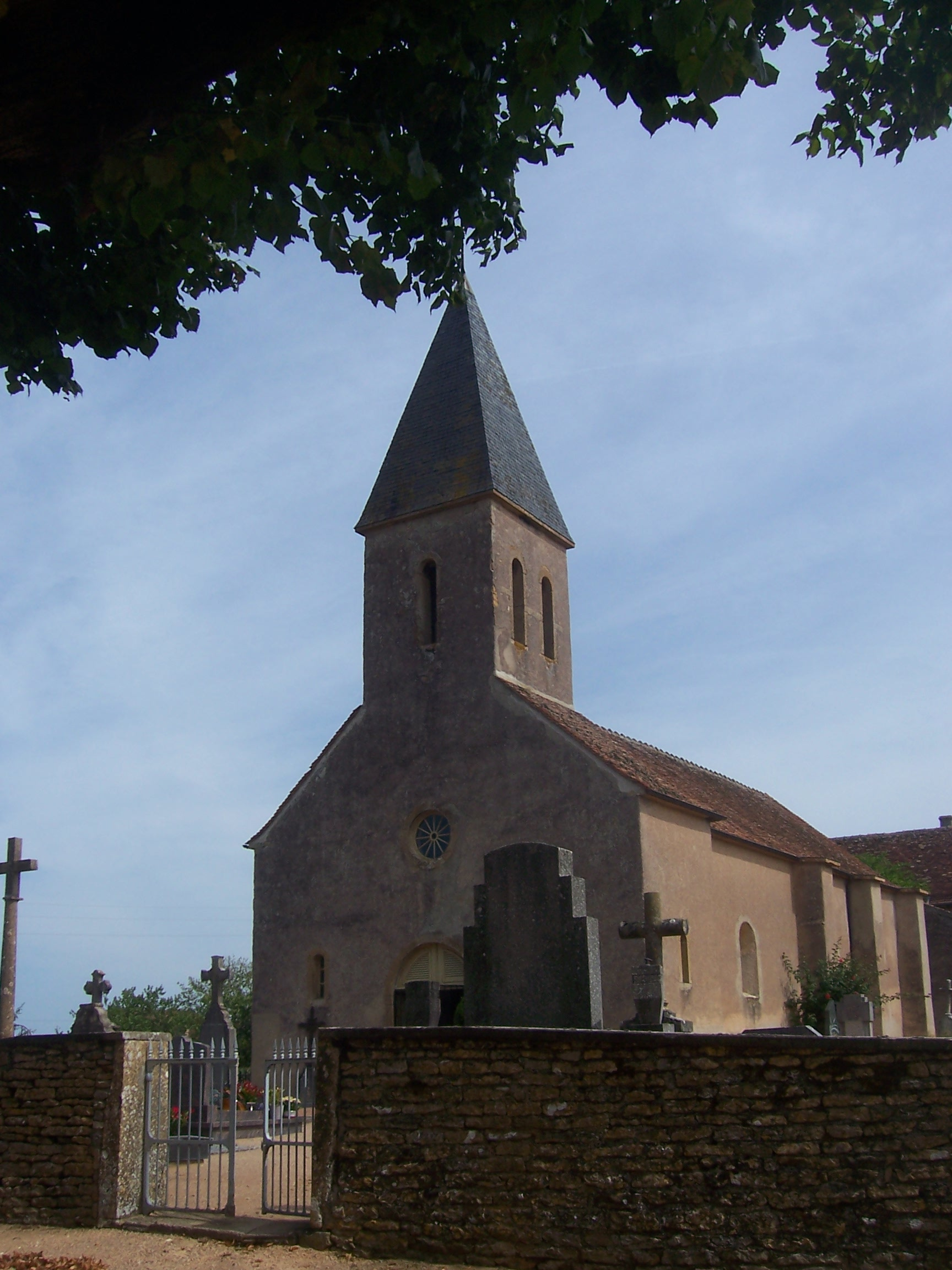
- Location of Vitry-lès-Cluny
- Location within France Location within Bourgogne-Franche-Comté
- Coordinates: 46°29′28″N 4°35′14″E
- Country: France
- Region: Bourgogne-Franche-Comté
- Department: Saône-et-Loire
- Arrondissement: Mâcon
- Canton: Cluny
- Commune: La Vineuse sur Fregande
- Area^{1}: 4.71 km^{2} (1.82 sq mi)
- Elevation: 200 m (660 ft)
- Highest elevation: 355 m (1,165 ft)
- Lowest elevation: 213 m (699 ft)
- Population (2022): 80
  - Density: 17/km^{2} (44/sq mi)
- Time zone: UTC+01:00 (CET)
  - Summer (DST): UTC+02:00 (CEST)
- Postal code: 71250
- ^{1} French Land Register data, which excludes lakes, ponds, glaciers > 1 km^{2} (0.386 sq mi or 247 acres) and river estuaries.

Vitry-lès-Cluny is a former commune in the Saône-et-Loire department in the region of Bourgogne-Franche-Comté in eastern France. On 1 January 2017, it was merged into the new commune La Vineuse sur Fregande.

== See also ==
- Communes of the Saône-et-Loire department
