= Wilfried Dalmat =

Footballer (born 1982)

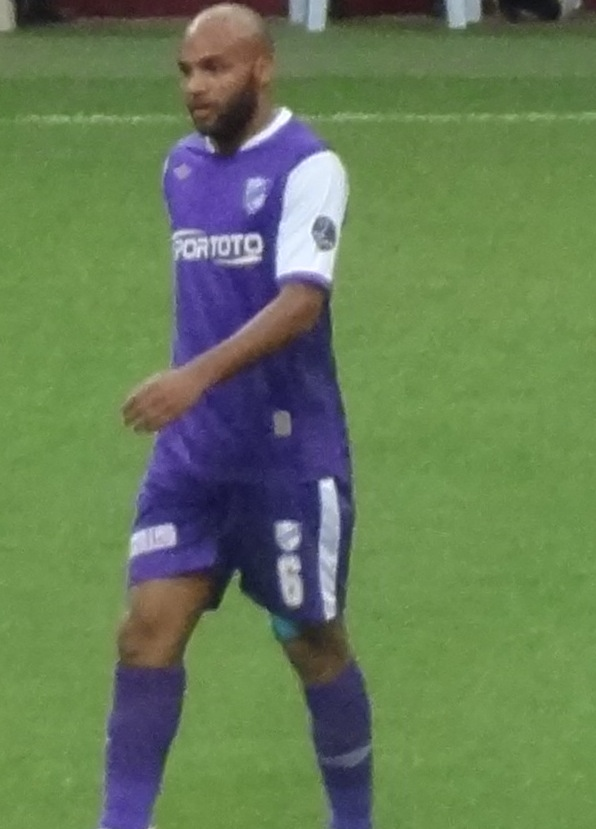
- Dalmat with Orduspor

Personal information
- Full name: Wilfried Dalmat
- Date of birth: 17 July 1982 (age 44)
- Place of birth: Massy, France
- Height: 1.76 m (5 ft 9 in)
- Position: Midfielder

Youth career
- –1996: Joué-les-Tours
- 1996–2000: Nantes

Senior career*
Years	Team	Apps	(Gls)
2000–2002	Nantes	10	(0)
2002	Marseille	12	(1)
2002–2003	Nantes	16	(2)
2003	Châteauroux	13	(1)
2003–2004	Grenoble	11	(0)
2004	Lecce	7	(1)
2004–2005	Grenoble	22	(1)
2005–2006	Racing Santander	8	(1)
2006–2008	RAEC Mons	66	(11)
2008–2010	Standard Liège	54	(6)
2010–2011	Club Brugge	26	(4)
2011–2013	Orduspor	25	(0)
2012	→ Karşıyaka	16	(1)
2013	→ Boluspor	11	(1)
2014	Panetolikos	11	(2)
2014–2015	RWS Bruxelles	16	(3)
2016–2019	Bourges 18	66	(22)
2019	Vierzon	5	(0)
2020	AS Montlouis	3	(1)
2020–2021	Solières Sport	1	(0)

International career
2019–2023	Saint Martin	12	(1)
- * Club domestic league appearances and goals

Wilfried Dalmat (born 17 July 1982) is a former professional footballer who played as a midfielder. Born in mainland France, he played for the Saint Martin national team.

== Club career ==
=== Early career in France ===
Dalmat started his career in the youth team of U.S. Chambray-lès-Tours. In 1996, he moved to FC Nantes, where he was promoted to the first team in 2000. He won the Ligue 1 title with Nantes in 2001, and the following season, he played as a substitute and scored, as Nantes won the 2001 Trophée des Champions. He made his first appearances in the UEFA Champions League on 11 September 2001, against PSV Eindhoven.

In January 2002, he moved to Olympique Marseille, with whom he came in ninth overall place. In the summer, he returned to Nantes, before leaving for LB Châteauroux of the Ligue 2 in the winter transfer window.

After a fifth place, he moved within the second-highest French tier to Grenoble, where he also remained the half season.

=== Stints in Italy and Spain ===
In the spring of 2004, he signed a contract with U.S. Lecce, for which he made 10 appearances in the Serie A. For the following season, he returned to Grenoble. Dalmat spent the 2005–06 season in Spain with Racing Santander, who escaped relegation by one point, finishing 17th.

=== Stints in Belgium ===
Dalmat then moved to Belgium to RAEC Mons, finishing 8th and 16th respectively, in his two seasons with the club. In 2008, he signed with Standard Liège, where he won his second league title, as well as his second Super Cup.

In the summer of 2010, he moved to Standard's rivals, Club Brugge.

=== Later years ===
On 10 December 2013, he signed a six-month contract with Greek club Panetolikos F.C. He was released on 9 April 2014.

He joined Solières Sport of the Belgian Second Amateur Division in January 2021. He left the club in October, citing "personal reasons".

== International career ==
Born in France of Martiniquais descent, Dalmat made his debut with the Saint Martin national team on 5 September 2019, in a 4–0 loss against Barbados in a match valid for the 2019–20 CONCACAF Nations League. Three days later, he also scored his first international goal in a 2–1 loss against U.S. Virgin Islands.

== Personal life ==
Dalmat's brother, Stéphane, is a retired footballer. In the 2005–06 season, the two brothers played together for Racing de Santander.

== Career statistics ==
=== International ===
Appearances and goals by national team and year
National team	Year	Apps	Goals
Saint Martin	2019	4	1
Saint Martin	2020	–	
Saint Martin	2021	–	
Saint Martin	2022	4	0
Saint Martin	2023	4	0
Total		12	1

Scores and results list Saint Martin's goal tally first, score column indicates score after each Dalmat goal.

List of international goals scored by Wilfried Dalmat
No.	Date	Venue	Opponent	Score	Result	Competition
1	8 September 2019	Raymond E. Guishard Technical Centre, The Valley, Anguilla	U.S. Virgin Islands	1–2	1–2	2019–20 CONCACAF Nations League C

== Honours ==
Nantes

- Ligue 1: 2000–01
- Trophée des Champions: 2001

Standard Liège

- Belgian First Division A: 2008–09
- Belgian Super Cup: 2008, 2009
