= Mario Yepes =

Colombian footballer (born 1976)

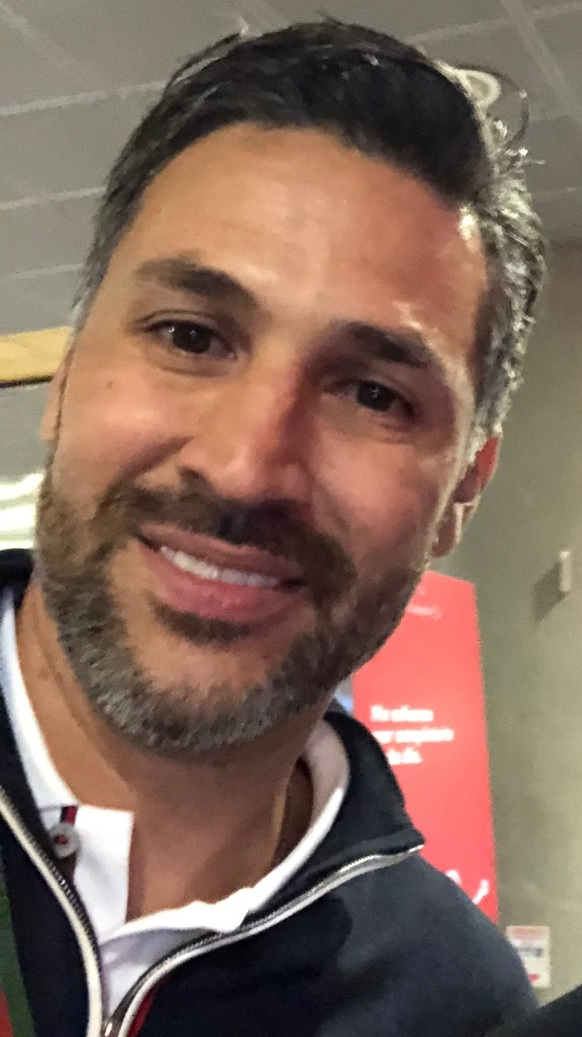
- Yepes in 2019

Personal information
- Full name: Mario Alberto Yepes Díaz
- Date of birth: 13 January 1976 (age 50)
- Place of birth: Cali, Colombia
- Height: 1.86 m (6 ft 1 in)
- Position: Centre back

Senior career*
Years	Team	Apps	(Gls)
1994–1997	Cortuluá	76	(7)
1997–1999	Deportivo Cali	93	(11)
1999–2002	River Plate	76	(6)
2002–2004	Nantes	73	(2)
2004–2008	Paris Saint-Germain	115	(8)
2008–2010	Chievo	63	(1)
2010–2013	AC Milan	38	(1)
2013–2014	Atalanta	24	(0)
2014–2015	San Lorenzo	31	(0)
Total		580	(36)

International career
1999–2014	Colombia	102	(6)

Managerial career
- 2016–2017: Deportivo Cali
Medal record
Representing (Colombia)
Copa América
Winner	2001	Team
- * Club domestic league appearances and goals

Mario Alberto Yepes Díaz (Spanish pronunciation: [ˈmaɾjo ˈʝepes]; born 13 January 1976) is a Colombian former professional footballer who played as a centre-back. He is well known for his time in Paris Saint-Germain, where he was considered to be one of the best defenders at the time, being dubbed by fans as "Super Mario". During his time in Italy with Chievo, he earned a reputation in the media as a solid and physical old-fashioned man-marking centre-back, known as a "stopper" in Italian football jargon. He served as the captain of the Colombia national team between 2008 and 2014.

Having begun his career in 1999, and having played for the Colombia national team during that period, Yepes is one of only two players that can truly be considered to be part of the late 1990s and early 2000s golden generation of Colombian football which won the 2001 Copa América and ended in 2003, but has also been part of Colombia's present golden generation (which began in 2013). Faryd Mondragón is the other Colombian footballer of the two, but officially retired in 2014.

Yepes began his managerial career with hometown club Deportivo Cali, whom he managed from 2016 to 2017.

== Club career ==
=== Early career ===
Mario Yepes started his playing career in 1994 with Cortuluá, as a forward before Cortulua's coach converted him to a libero (sweeper).

Yepes signed for his home town club Deportivo Cali in 1998. He won a Colombian championship with Deportivo Cali. He was part of the squad for the 1999 Copa Libertadores.

In 1999, he joined River Plate in Argentina, where he won two Argentine Primera championships.

In 2002, Yepes moved to Europe, signing for Nantes in the French Ligue 1. After two-and-half personally successful seasons with Nantes, Yepes joined fellow Ligue 1 side Paris Saint-Germain in 2004. Yepes would become a mainstay in the PSG side winning the Coupe de France in 2006 and the Coupe de la Ligue in 2008, though he did not feature in the second final.

In 2008, Yepes joined Chievo in Italy. He signed a new long-term contract in summer 2009.

=== AC Milan ===
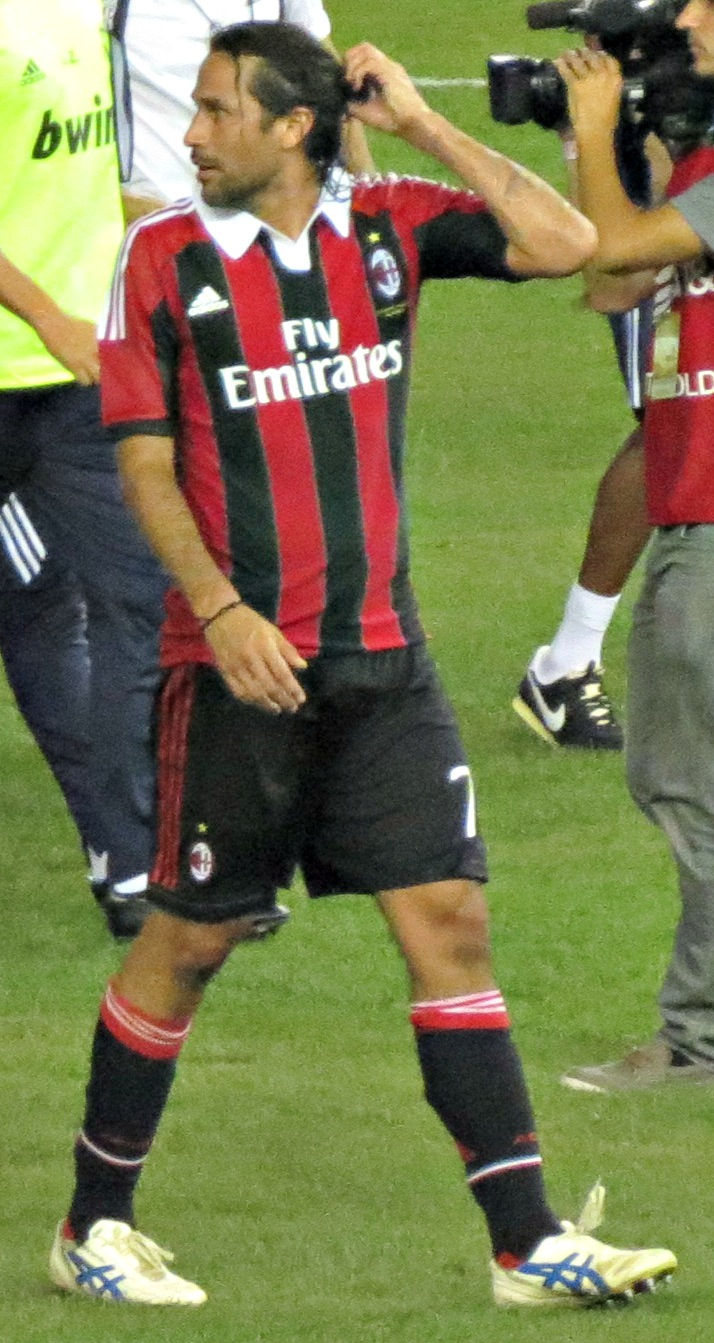
Yepes in action for Milan in 2012

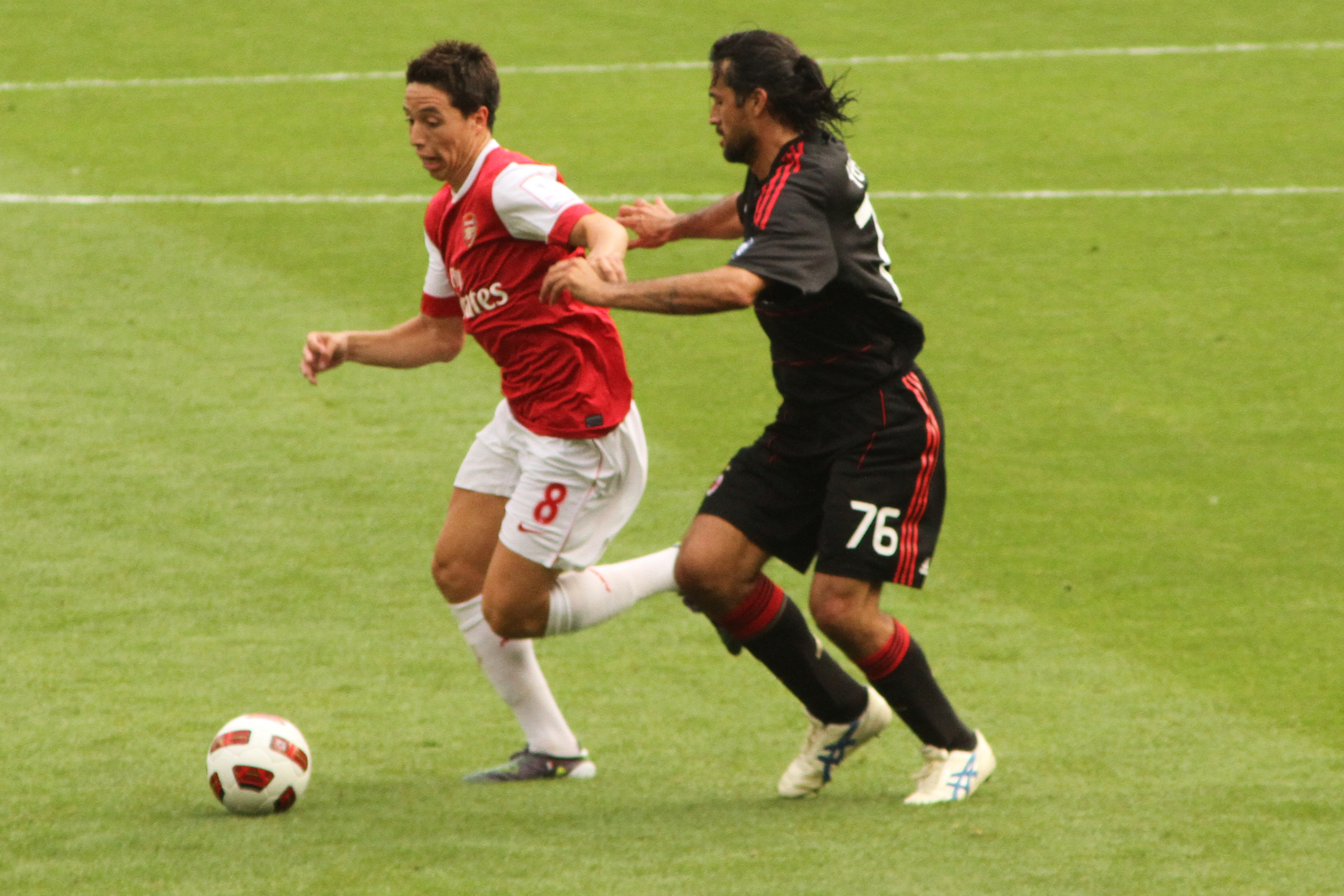
Yepes challenging for the ball with Arsenal's Samir Nasri

In March 2010, Chievo teammate Sergio Pellissier confirmed that Yepes would join AC Milan in the summer, when his contract ran out.

Yepes got to Milan in the 2010–11 season but was quickly deployed as a substitute due to the starting centre-back being Thiago Silva. Yepes played few games in the Italian Serie A, but participated in the UEFA Champions League. Yepes was close to scoring with Milan in the UEFA Champions League match against Tottenham Hotspur, in which he had two clear chances of scoring with a header, but was denied twice by Tottenham keeper Heurelho Gomes.

Yepes scored his first goal for Milan on 23 October 2011, where he finished off a comeback against Lecce, scoring the fourth and winning goal for Milan in the 83rd minute to drive the Rossoneri to a 4–3 victory, with Kevin-Prince Boateng scoring a hat-trick to level the scores after a 3–0 losing position.

On 12 May 2012, Yepes signed a one-year extension contract with Milan, keeping him at the club until the summer of 2013. After being an irregular player during the following season, however, Yepes stated that he would not sign a new contract with the club despite being offered the chance, expressing that he needed more "guaranteed" playing time in order to better prepare himself for the 2014 FIFA World Cup. He later confirmed that Milan would not offer him as such and his reason for departure.

=== Atalanta ===
On 14 July 2013, Yepes signed a one-year contract with Serie A club Atalanta. He made 26 appearances during the 2013–14 season and left the club at the end of the term.

=== San Lorenzo ===
On 13 September 2014, Argentine Primera División club San Lorenzo announced the signing of Yepes on a deal valid until the end of 2015. On 20 January 2016, he officially retired from professional football, joining Deportivo Cali as manager four months later.

== International career ==
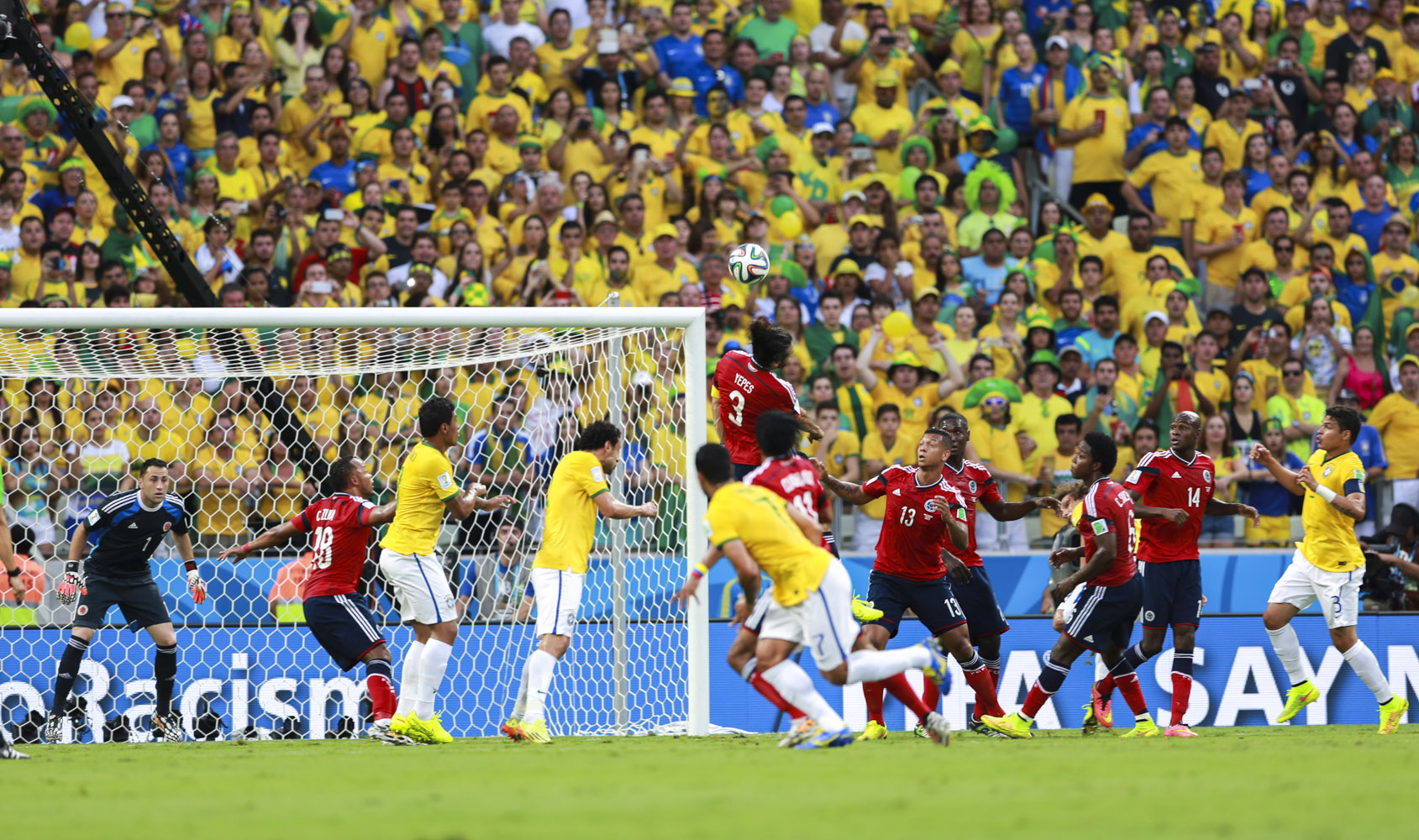
Yepes heading the ball against Brazil at the 2014 FIFA World Cup

Yepes has played 102 matches for the Colombia national team since his debut in 1999, making him the second-most capped Colombian player of all time, after Carlos Valderrama. He was part of the Colombia squad that won the Copa América in 2001. and was also in the squads for three other editions of the tournament in 1999, 2007 and 2011.

During the team's 2014 FIFA World Cup qualifying campaign, Yepes made 12 appearances as Colombia qualified for its first finals since 1998. In the final qualifying match, Yepes scored both goals in a 2–1 victory against Paraguay.

Due to his age during the 2014 World Cup qualifiers, Yepes expressed his passion for the national team and wanting to retire either after the World Cup qualifiers or during the 2014 World Cup. José Pékerman promised to meet with his retirement request. On 17 December 2013, Yepes announced that he would retire after the 2014 World Cup.

On 14 June 2014, Yepes made his first appearance in the FIFA World Cup finals stage at age 38, captaining Colombia to a 3–0 win over Greece in Belo Horizonte. Yepes was the oldest outfield player at the 2014 World Cup, and the second-oldest overall, after compatriot Faryd Mondragón.

On 19 June 2014, Yepes earned his 100th cap for Colombia in the second group stage match against the Ivory Coast, becoming the third Colombian player to reach the milestone after Valderrama and Leonel Álvarez. He led Colombia to its best ever World Cup performance as they reached the quarter-finals for the first time in their history, where they lost 2–1 to tournament hosts Brazil.

== Career after retiring as player ==
In late April 2016 Mario Alberto Yepes was named as manager of Deportivo Cali, which became his first managerial experience. Yepes came to replace Fernando "Pecoso" Castro, who had been dismissed for the poor recent results, especially the early elimination of Copa Libertadores and the farewell of the event at the hands of Boca Juniors with a 6–2 rout. Yepes's coaching team had Freddy Hurtado and Julián Barragán as assistants, and Daniel Curbelo as physical trainer. During his period as coach, Deportivo Cali was eliminated in the quarterfinals of the domestic league twice (at the hands of Independiente Medellín in the Apertura and Atlético Bucaramanga in the Finalización), and qualified for the 2017 Copa Sudamericana. However, a streak of poor performances in the start of the 2017 season plus a poor record while playing away from home, led to his exit from the club on 9 March 2017.

From 2019 to 2021, he served as Sports Director at the Colombian Football Federation and contributed to the coordination and management of development plans for the national teams.

In 2022, Yepes became the Latin American regional ambassador for Betsson, the world's largest gaming group, which said that as an AC Milan legend, he would also help engage Milan fans in the region.

== Personal life ==
Yepes was married to Colombian Carolina Villegas up to 2023. He and his wife have three children, his son Luciano Yepes was born in May 2002, his daughter Miranda Yepes was born in April 2005. and his third son Valentino Yepes was born on 2012

After participating in the Colombian version of Masterchef Celebrity, he started dating Colombian actress Caterin Escobar.

== Career statistics ==
=== Club ===
Appearances and goals by club, season and competition
Club	Season	League			National cup		League cup		Continental		Total	
Club	Season	Division	Apps	Goals	Apps	Goals	Apps	Goals	Apps	Goals	Apps	Goals
Cortuluá	1994	Categoría Primera A	4	0	0	0	0	0	0	0	4	0
Cortuluá	1995	Categoría Primera A	15	0	0	0	0	0	0	0	15	0
Cortuluá	1995–96	Categoría Primera A	40	4	0	0	0	0	0	0	40	4
Cortuluá	1996–97	Categoría Primera A	17	3	0	0	0	0	0	0	17	3
Cortuluá	Total		76	7	0	0	0	0	0	0	76	6
Deportivo Cali	1997–98	Categoría Primera A	32	4	0	0	0	0	0	0	32	4
Deportivo Cali	1998–99	Categoría Primera A	48	6	0	0	0	0	0	0	48	6
Deportivo Cali	1999–00	Categoría Primera A	13	1	12	0	0	0	0	0	25	1
Deportivo Cali	Total		93	11	12	0	0	0	0	0	105	11
River Plate	1999–00	Argentine Primera División	29	2	0	0	0	0	0	0	29	2
River Plate	2000–01	Argentine Primera División	33	2	0	1	0	0	0	0	33	3
River Plate	2001–02	Argentine Primera División	14	2	0	0	0	0	0	0	14	2
River Plate	Total		76	6	0	1	0	0	0	0	77	7
Nantes	2001–02	French Division 1	11	0	1	0	0	0	2	0	14	0
Nantes	2002–03	Ligue 1	33	2	0	0	0	0	0	0	33	2
Nantes	2003–04	Ligue 1	29	0	4	2	0	0	2	1	35	3
Nantes	Total		73	2	5	2	0	0	4	1	82	5
Paris Saint-Germain	2004–05	Ligue 1	32	3	3	1	0	0	4	0	39	4
Paris Saint-Germain	2005–06	Ligue 1	32	4	4	0	0	0	0	0	36	4
Paris Saint-Germain	2006–07	Ligue 1	24	1	4	0	0	0	3	0	31	1
Paris Saint-Germain	2007–08	Ligue 1	27	0	4	0	0	0	3	0	31	0
Paris Saint-Germain	Total		115	8	15	1	0	0	10	0	140	9
Chievo	2008–09	Serie A	32	0	0	0	0	0	0	0	32	0
Chievo	2009–10	Serie A	31	1	1	0	0	0	0	0	32	1
Chievo	Total		63	1	1	0	0	0	0	0	64	1
AC Milan	2010–11	Serie A	13	0	2	0	0	0	2	0	17	0
AC Milan	2011–12	Serie A	11	1	0	0	0	0	0	0	11	1
AC Milan	2012–13	Serie A	14	0	1	1	0	0	3	0	18	1
AC Milan	Total		38	1	3	1	0	0	5	0	46	2
Atalanta	2013–14	Serie A	24	0	2	0	0	0	0	0	26	0
San Lorenzo	2014–15	Argentine Primera División	31	0	1	0	0	0	7	0	39	0
Career total			580	36	39	5	0	0	21	1	640	42

=== International ===
Appearances and goals by national team and year
National team	Year	Apps	Goals
Colombia	1999	3	0
Colombia	2000	9	0
Colombia	2001	13	0
Colombia	2003	12	1
Colombia	2004	7	1
Colombia	2005	7	1
Colombia	2007	5	1
Colombia	2008	3	0
Colombia	2009	9	0
Colombia	2010	6	0
Colombia	2011	9	0
Colombia	2012	5	0
Colombia	2013	7	2
Colombia	2014	7	0
Total		102	6

Scores and results list Colombia's goal tally first, score column indicates score after each Yepes goal.

List of international goals scored by Mario Yepes
No.	Date	Venue	Opponent	Score	Result	Competition
1	20 June 2003	Stade de Gerland, Lyon, France	New Zealand	2–1	3–1	2003 FIFA Confederations Cup
2	17 November 2004	Estadio Metropolitano Roberto Meléndez, Barranquilla, Colombia	Bolivia	1–0	1–0	2006 FIFA World Cup qualification
3	30 May 2005	Giants Stadium, East Rutherford, United States	England	1–2	2–3	Friendly
4	23 June 2007	Estadio Metropolitano Roberto Meléndez, Barranquilla, Colombia	Ecuador	2–1	3–1	Friendly
5	15 October 2013	Estadio Defensores del Chaco, Asunción, Paraguay	Paraguay	1–1	2–1	2014 FIFA World Cup qualification
6	15 October 2013	Estadio Defensores del Chaco, Asunción, Paraguay	Paraguay	2–1	2–1	2014 FIFA World Cup qualification

== Honours ==
As of 27 August 2014

Deportivo Cali

- Categoría Primera A: 1998
- Copa Libertadores: runner-up 1999

River Plate

- Argentine Primera División: Apertura 1999, Clausura 2000

Paris Saint-Germain

- Coupe de France: 2005–06
- Coupe de la Ligue: 2007–08
- Trophée des Champions: runner-up 2006

A.C. Milan

- Serie A: 2010–11
- Supercoppa Italiana: 2011

San Lorenzo

- Recopa Sudamericana: runner-up 2015
- FIFA Club World Cup: runner-up 2014

Colombia

- Copa América: 2001

Individual

- Ligue 1 Team of the Year: 2003–04, 2005–06

== See also ==
- List of men's footballers with 100 or more international caps
