= Donzy-le-National =

- Part of La Vineuse sur Fregande
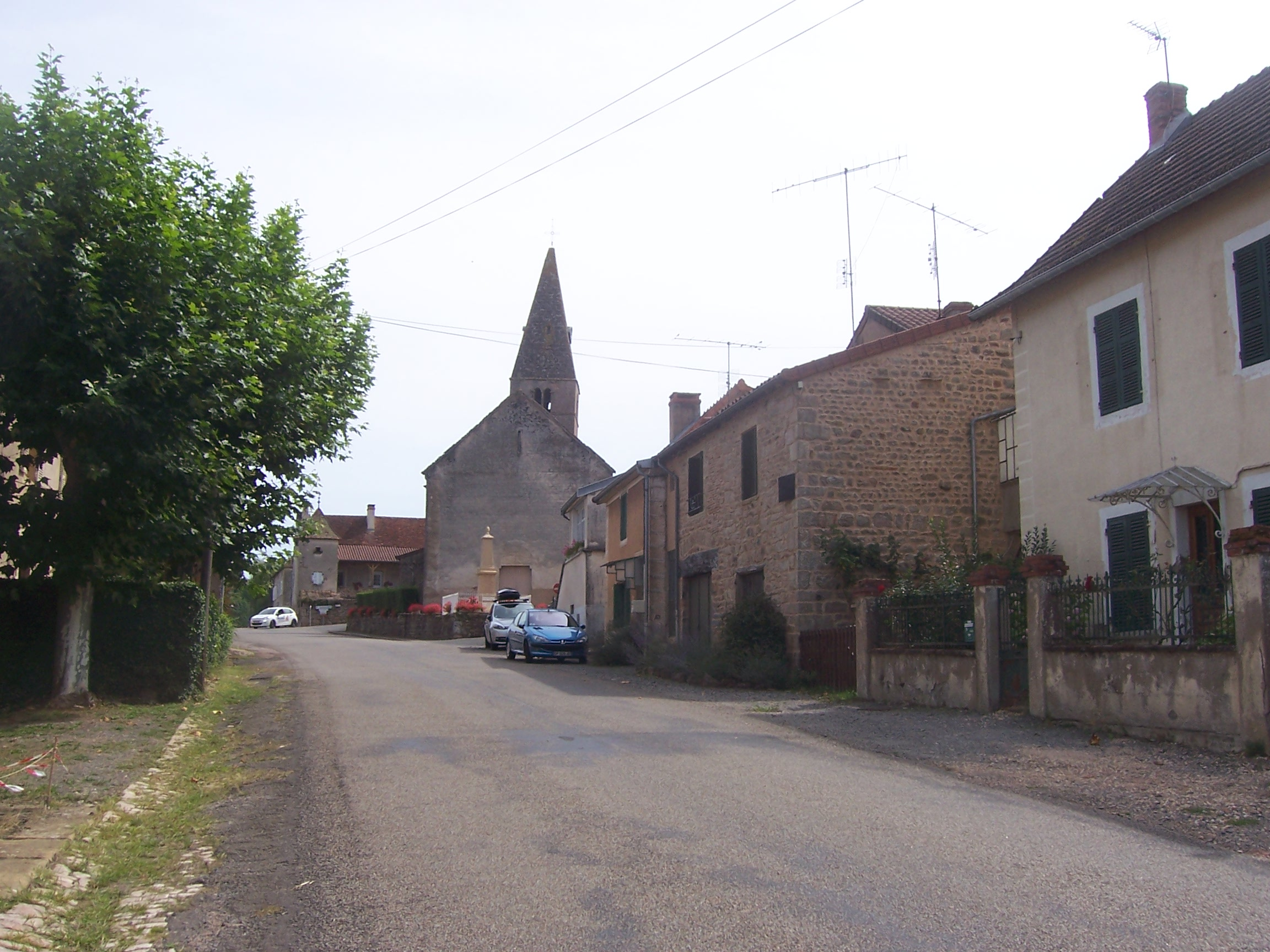
- Location of Donzy-le-National
- Location within France Location within Bourgogne-Franche-Comté
- Coordinates: 46°27′16″N 4°34′00″E
- Country: France
- Region: Bourgogne-Franche-Comté
- Department: Saône-et-Loire
- Arrondissement: Mâcon
- Canton: Cluny
- Commune: La Vineuse sur Fregande
- Area^{1}: 10.28 km^{2} (3.97 sq mi)
- Elevation: 307 m (1,007 ft)
- Highest elevation: 480 m (1,570 ft)
- Lowest elevation: 235 m (771 ft)
- Population (2022): 224
  - Density: 21.8/km^{2} (56.4/sq mi)
- Time zone: UTC+01:00 (CET)
  - Summer (DST): UTC+02:00 (CEST)
- Postal code: 71250
- ^{1} French Land Register data, which excludes lakes, ponds, glaciers > 1 km^{2} (0.386 sq mi or 247 acres) and river estuaries.

Donzy-le-National is a former commune in the Saône-et-Loire department in the region of Bourgogne-Franche-Comté in eastern France. On 1 January 2017, it was merged into the new commune La Vineuse sur Fregande.

== History ==
In 1775, a rabid wolf bit a dozen people in different hamlets of the parish. Some were disfigured and all perished from rabies despite the care provided by a doctor, Dr. Blais, who had gathered the sick in a house in Cluny transformed into a hospital.

During the French Revolution, the town, then called Donzy-le-Royal, was temporarily renamed Donzy-le-National before reverting to its earlier name. It was in 1890 that the town adopted the revolutionary name it bears today. This is the name the town still uses today, like four other towns in the Saône-et-Loire department which, like Donzy-le-National, have retained their revolutionary name.

== See also ==
- Communes of the Saône-et-Loire department
