= Nicolas Bonis =

French footballer (born 1981)

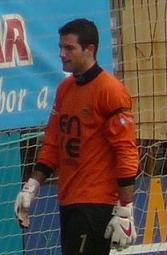
- Bonis as a Pontevedra player

Personal information
- Date of birth: 31 August 1981 (age 45)
- Place of birth: Wissembourg, France
- Height: 1.92 m (6 ft 3 1/2 in)
- Position: Goalkeeper

Youth career
- FCSR Haguenau
- 1998–2000: Strasbourg

Senior career*
| Years | Team | Apps | (Gls) |
| 2000–2005 | Strasbourg | 11 | (0) |
| 2005–2008 | Pontevedra | 104 | (0) |
| 2008–2010 | Alavés | 17 | (0) |
| 2010 | Ceuta | 8 | (0) |
| 2010–2013 | Atlético Baleares | 38 | (0) |
| Total | | 178 | (0) |
- * Club domestic league appearances and goals

Nicolas Bonis (born 31 August 1981) is a French retired footballer who played as a goalkeeper. Besides France, he has also played in Spain.

== Football career ==
Born in Wissembourg, Bas-Rhin, Bonis started out professionally at RC Strasbourg, but could never impose himself in the first team during three Ligue 1 seasons. In the 2005 summer he moved abroad, joining Spanish club Pontevedra CF which had just suffered relegation to the third division.

After solid performances for the Galician side, albeit without promotion, Bonis signed for Deportivo Alavés in the second level on a two-year deal, but appeared sparingly (17 matches out of 42) in his first season, which ended also in relegation.
