= Denis Stinat =

French footballer (born 1983)

Personal information
- Date of birth: 18 July 1983 (age 43)
- Place of birth: Chartres, France
- Height: 1.73 m (5 ft 8 in)
- Position: Left-back

Team information
- Current team: Bergerac Périgord (assistant)

Youth career
- –1999: Pau
- 1999–2004: FC Nantes

Senior career*
Years	Team	Apps	(Gls)
2004–2006	Nantes	7	(0)
2005–2006	→ Dijon (loan)	14	(0)
2006–2009	Brest	53	(0)
2010	Pau	13	(0)
2010–2011	Les Herbiers	15	(0)
2011–2012	Martigues	16	(0)
2012–2013	Paray-le-Monial		
2013–2016	Gueugnon	46	(0)
2016–2018	Bayonne		

Managerial career
- 2018–2019: Bayonne B
- 2019–2020: Bayonne (assistant)
- 2020–2021: Stade Poitevin (assistant)
- 2021–: Bergerac Périgord (assistant)
- * Club domestic league appearances and goals

Denis Stinat (born 18 July 1983 in Chartres) is a retired French association footballer, who played as a left-back and current assistant manager of Bergerac Périgord.

== Career ==
=== Coaching career ===
In the beginning of 2018, Stinat was appointed manager of Bayonne's reserve team, which was playing in the Regional 1. In the 2019-20 season, he was promoted to assistant coach of the first team.

In the summer 2020, he was appointed assistant manager of Stade Poitevin. Stinat left the club, alongside manager Erwan Lannuzel, at the end of the 2020-21 season. Ahead of the 2021-22 season, the duo joined Bergerac Périgord.
