= Nicolas Gillet =

French footballer (born 1976)

Personal information
- Date of birth: 8 November 1976 (age 50)
- Place of birth: Brétigny-sur-Orge, Essonne, France
- Height: 1.85 m (6 ft 1 in)
- Position: Defender

Youth career
- 1993–1997: Nantes

Senior career*
Years	Team	Apps	(Gls)
1997–2004	Nantes	149	(11)
2004–2007	Lens	57	(2)
2007–2010	Le Havre	85	(6)
2010–2012	Angers	26	(1)
Total		317	(20)

International career
2001	France	1	(0)
- * Club domestic league appearances and goals

Nicolas Gillet (French: [nikɔla ʒilɛ]; born 8 November 1976) is a French former professional footballer who played as a defender. In 2001, he earned a cap for France during the 2001 Confederations Cup against Australia.

== Career ==
Whilst at FC Nantes Gillet contributed 27 appearances as his side won the 2000–01 Division 1. He also played in the victorious 1999 and 2000 Coupe de France finals, and the 2001 Trophée des Champions.

== Career statistics ==
Appearances and goals by club, season and competition
Club	Season	League			Cup (Note: Includes Coupe de France, Coupe de la Ligue)		Continental (Note: Includes UEFA Champions League, UEFA Cup, UEFA Intertoto-Cup)		Total	
Club	Season	Division	Apps	Goals	Apps	Goals	Apps	Goals	Apps	Goals
Nantes	1997–98	Division 1	3	0	1	0	–		4	0
Nantes	1998–99	Division 1	17	1	4	0	–		21	1
Nantes	1999–00	Division 1	25	1	6	0	6	0	37	1
Nantes	2000–01	Division 1	27	1	8	0	8	3	43	4
Nantes	2001–02	Division 1	25	0	3	1	8	0	36	1
Nantes	2002–03	Ligue 1	33	6	3	2	–		36	8
Nantes	2003–04	Ligue 1	19	2	5	0	–		24	2
Nantes	Total		149	11	30	3	22	3	201	17
Lens	2004–05	Ligue 1	33	1	4	0	–		37	1
Lens	2005–06	Ligue 1	16	1	2	0	11	1	29	2
Lens	2006–07	Ligue 1	8	0	5	0	7	0	20	0
Lens	Total		57	2	11	0	18	1	86	3
Le Havre	2007–08	Ligue 2	31	4	1	0	–		32	4
Le Havre	2008–09	Ligue 1	20	0	1	0	–		21	0
Le Havre	2009–10	Ligue 2	34	2	1	1	–		35	3
Le Havre	Total		85	6	3	1	0	0	88	7
Angers	2010–11	Ligue 2	24	1	3	0	–		27	1
Angers	2011–12	Ligue 2	2	0	1	0	–		3	0
Angers	Total		26	1	4	0	0	0	30	1
Career total			317	20	48	4	40	4	405	28

== Honours ==
Nantes

- Coupe de France: 1998–99, 1999–2000
- Division 1: 2000–01
- Trophée des Champions: 2001

Lens

- UEFA Intertoto Cup: 2005

France

- FIFA Confederations Cup: 2001
