= Massy, Saône-et-Loire =

Massy
- Part of La Vineuse sur Fregande
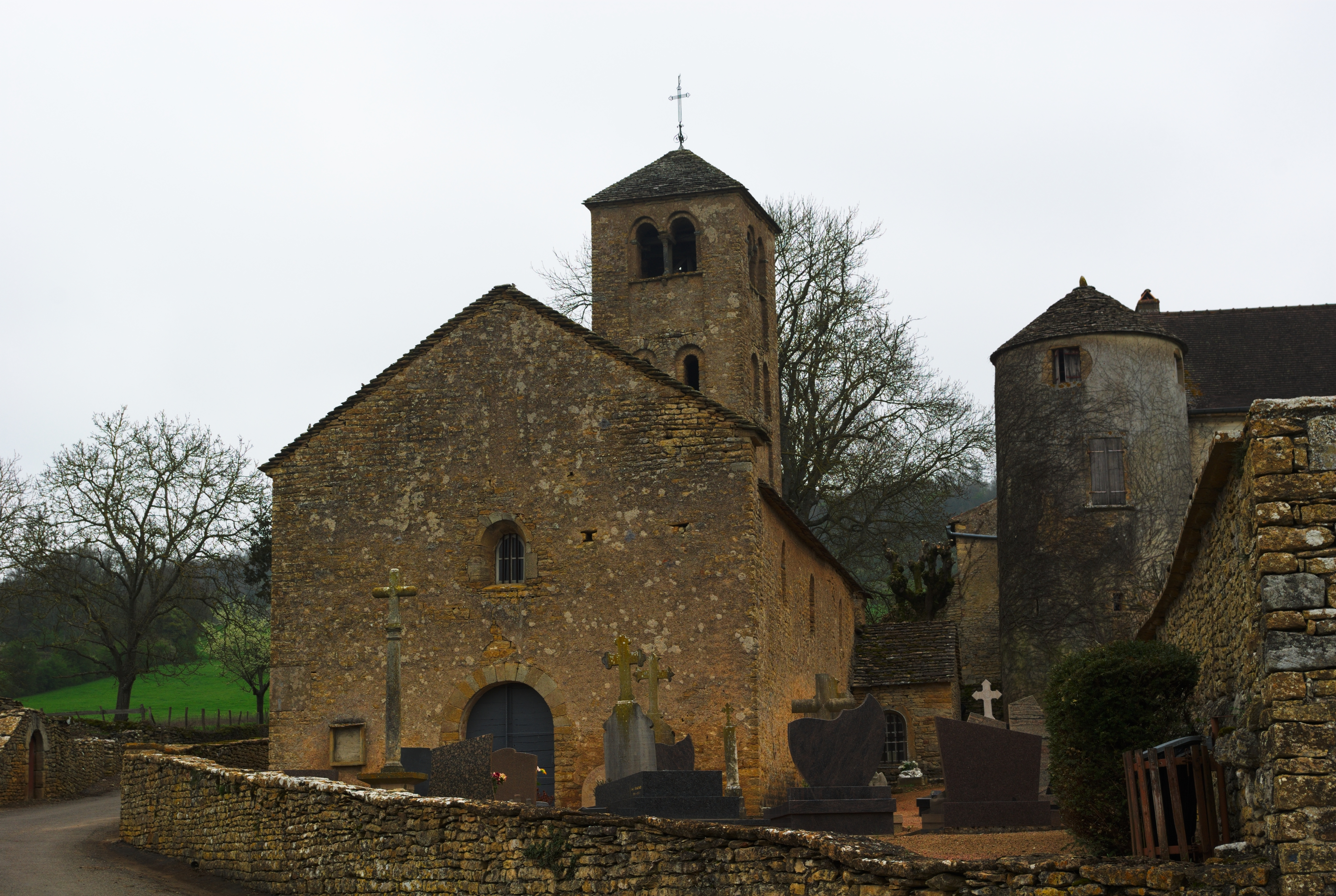
- Location of Massy
- Location within France Location within Bourgogne-Franche-Comté
- Coordinates: 46°29′06″N 4°36′21″E
- Country: France
- Region: Bourgogne-Franche-Comté
- Department: Saône-et-Loire
- Arrondissement: Mâcon
- Canton: Cluny
- Commune: La Vineuse sur Fregande
- Area^{1}: 5.07 km^{2} (1.96 sq mi)
- Elevation: 250 m (820 ft)
- Highest elevation: 389 m (1,276 ft)
- Lowest elevation: 222 m (728 ft)
- Population (2022): 54
  - Density: 11/km^{2} (28/sq mi)
- Time zone: UTC+01:00 (CET)
  - Summer (DST): UTC+02:00 (CEST)
- Postal code: 71250
- ^{1} French Land Register data, which excludes lakes, ponds, glaciers > 1 km^{2} (0.386 sq mi or 247 acres) and river estuaries.

Massy (French pronunciation: [masi]) is a former commune in the Saône-et-Loire department in the region of Bourgogne-Franche-Comté in eastern France. On 1 January 2017, it was merged into the new commune La Vineuse sur Fregande.

== Sights ==
- Church Saint-Denis, dating from the eleventh century, listed as a historic monument since 1991.
- Ruins from Roman times, including a small bridge crossing the river.
- An old fortified middle-age castle build on the base of Roman constructions. It used to be a subsidiary of the Cluny Monastery

== See also ==
- Communes of the Saône-et-Loire department
