= Olivier Quint =

French footballer (born 1971)

Personal information
- Date of birth: 29 November 1971 (age 54)
- Place of birth: Saint-Quentin, France
- Height: 1.82 m (6 ft 0 in)
- Position: Midfielder

Team information
- Current team: Basse-Goulaine (Manager)

Youth career
- 1987–1991: Rouen

Senior career*
Years	Team	Apps	(Gls)
1991–1995	Rouen	40	(2)
1995–1997	RC Épernay	7	(0)
1997–2001	Sedan	138	(31)
2001–2006	Nantes	115	(8<)
2006–2008	Avenir RCT		
2008–2010	Montaigu		
2010–2012	AC Chapelain		

Managerial career
- 2008–2010: Montaigu (player-coach)
- 2012–2014: AC Chapelain (staff)
- 2014–2016: AC Chapelain (assistant)
- 2016–2020: AC Chapelain
- 2020–: Basse-Goulaine
- * Club domestic league appearances and goals

Olivier Quint (born 29 November 1971) is a French former professional footballer and current manager of Basse-Goulaine.

== Playing career ==
Quint was born in Saint-Quentin, Aisne. He played professionally for CS Sedan Ardennes and Nantes. (Note: Olivier Quint – French league stats at LFP – also available in French (archived)) While at Nantes he scored as they won the 2001 Trophée des Champions.

== Coaching career ==
In April 2008 it was confirmed, that Quint had been appointed player-coach of FC Montaigu from the 2008–09 season. He stayed there for two seasons, narrowly managing to keep the club's top flight team in the French Régional 1 in 2010. At the end of the season, in May 2010, he left the club by mutual agreement.

In 2010, he returned to the field as a player for AC Chapelain, in La Chapelle-sur-Erdre, a team playing in the Division d'Honneur. He played two seasons, before becoming a part of the club's technical staff, allegedly as a sports coordinator and responsible for the youth sector. From the 2014–15 season, he was promoted to the first team staff, as an assistant coach on the first team under manager Nordine Chaouch.

Ahead of the 2016–17 season, he was appointed head coach of AC Chapelain. He left the club ahead of the 2021–22 season, as he had been appointed manager of Basse-Goulaine.
