= Jacques Momha =

Cameroonian footballer (born 1982)

Personal information
- Full name: Jacques Momha
- Date of birth: 7 August 1982 (age 44)
- Place of birth: Edéa, Cameroon
- Height: 1.75 m (5 ft 9 in)
- Position: Left back

Youth career
- 1997–1999: Kadji Sports
- 1999–2000: Strasbourg

Senior career*
Years	Team	Apps	(Gls)
2000–2006	Strasbourg B	83	(3)
2001–2004	Strasbourg	35	(0)
2005–2006	→ Laval (loan)	16	(0)
2006–2009	Vitória Guimarães	31	(1)
2009	Gençlerbirliği	18	(1)
2010–2011	Manisaspor	9	(0)
2012–2014	Strasbourg	21	(0)
Total		213	(5)
- * Club domestic league appearances and goals

Jacques Momha (born 7 August 1982) is a Cameroonian former professional footballer who played as a left back.

== Club career ==
Born in Edéa, Momha began his senior career as an 18-year-old in France at RC Strasbourg, spending the vast majority of his spell associated to the reserves, however, and also being loaned to Stade Lavallois of Ligue 2 in the 2005–06 season. He moved to Vitória de Guimarães in July 2006, being sparingly played as the Minho team moved straight from the second division into a third place in the Primeira Liga in the 2007–08 campaign.

After having established himself in the starting line-up, Momha left Vitória in mid-January 2009, signing for Turkish club Gençlerbirliği SK. The following year, in the same month, he joined fellow Süper Lig side Manisaspor.
