= 2005–06 Paris Saint-Germain FC season =

36th season in existence of Paris Saint-Germain

Paris Saint-Germain
2005–06 season
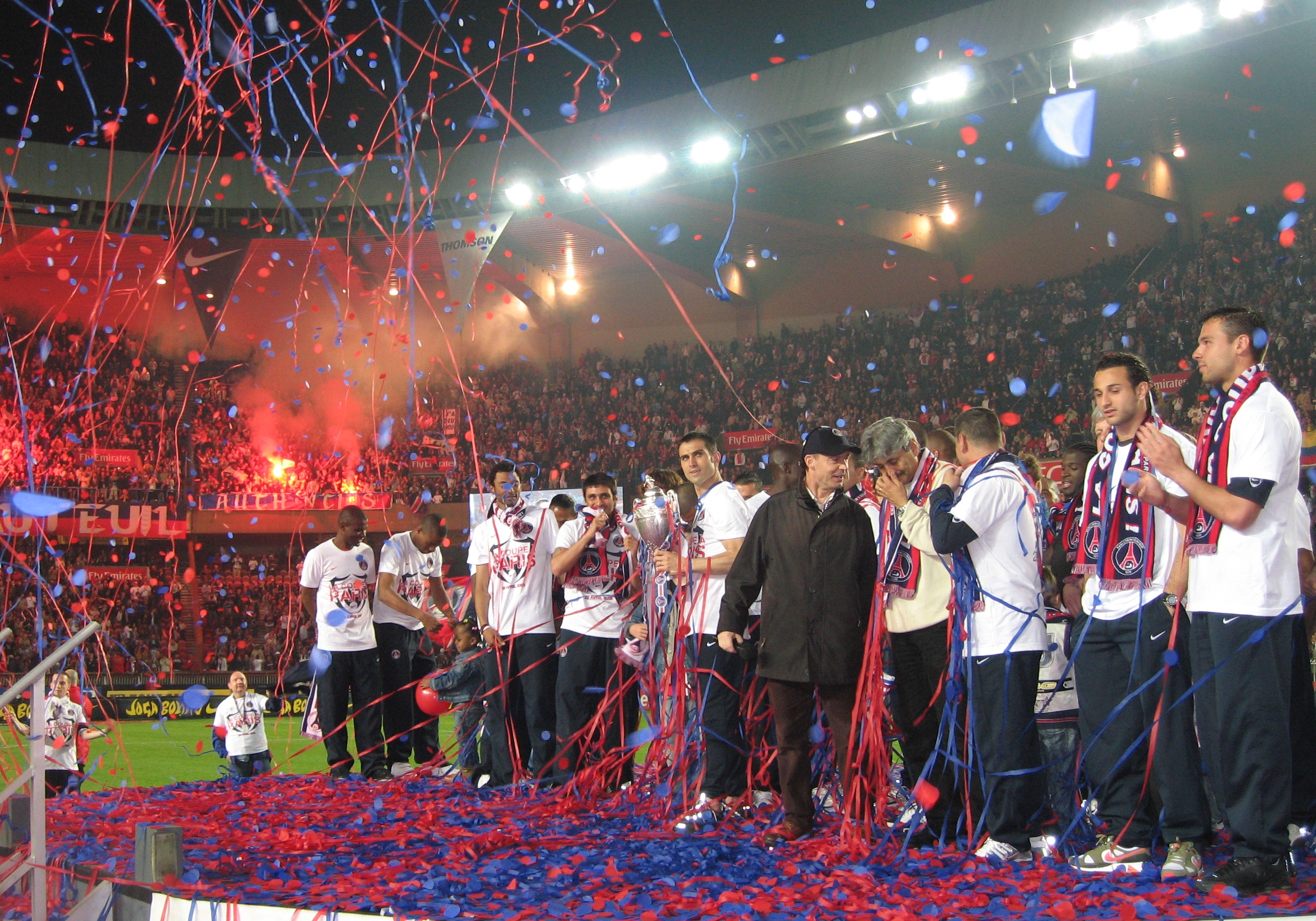
- Paris Saint-Germain players with the Coupe de France trophy
- President: Pierre Blayau
- Head coach: Laurent Fournier (until 27 December 2005); Guy Lacombe (from 27 December 2005)
- Stadium: Parc des Princes
- Ligue 1: 9th
- Coupe de France: Winners
- Coupe de la Ligue: Round of 16
- Top goalscorer: League: Pauleta (21); All: Pauleta (28)
- Highest home attendance: 43,555 (vs Monaco, 6 November 2005)
- Lowest home attendance: 18,000 (vs Auxerre, 1 February 2006)
- Average home league attendance: 40,485
Home colours	Away colours	Third colours

The 2005–06 season was Paris Saint-Germain's 36th season in existence. PSG played their home league games at the Parc des Princes in Paris, registering an average attendance of 40,485 spectators per match. The club was presided by Pierre Blayau. The team was coached by Laurent Fournier until 27 December 2005, when Guy Lacombe replaced him. Pauleta was the team captain.

== Players ==
As of the 2005–06 season.

=== Squad ===
Note: Flags indicate national team as defined under FIFA eligibility rules; some limited exceptions apply. Players may hold more than one non-FIFA nationality.

No.	Pos.	Nation	Player
1	GK	FRA	Lionel Letizi
2	DF	FRA	Stéphane Pichot
3	DF	FRA	Jean-Michel Badiane
4	DF	CZE	David Rozehnal
5	DF	FRA	Bernard Mendy
6	DF	COL	Mario Yepes
7	MF	FRA	Fabrice Pancrate
8	MF	FRA	Édouard Cissé
9	FW	POR	Pauleta (captain)
10	MF	FRA	Vikash Dhorasoo
12	MF	URU	Cristian Rodríguez
13	MF	FRA	Hocine Ragued
14	MF	FRA	Rudy Haddad
15	MF	CIV	Bonaventure Kalou
16	GK	FRA	Jérôme Alonzo

No.	Pos.	Nation	Player
17	DF	CMR	Jean-Hugues Ateba
18	FW	URU	Carlos Bueno
22	DF	FRA	Sylvain Armand
23	MF	CMR	Modeste M'bami
24	MF	FRA	Christophe Landrin
25	MF	FRA	Jérôme Rothen
26	DF	SEN	Boukary Dramé
28	DF	BRA	Paulo César
30	GK	FRA	Mohamed Benhamou
31	MF	FRA	Samuel Piètre
32	DF	MAR	Ahmed Kantari
33	GK	FRA	Nicolas Cousin
34	FW	CIV	Franck Dja Djédjé
—	DF	CIV	Sol Bamba
—	FW	FRA	David Ngog

=== Left club during season ===
Note: Flags indicate national team as defined under FIFA eligibility rules; some limited exceptions apply. Players may hold more than one non-FIFA nationality.

No.	Pos.	Nation	Player
11	MF	RUS	Sergei Semak (to FC Moscow)
19	MF	ALB	Lorik Cana (to Marseille)
20	MF	SCG	Branko Bošković (on loan to Troyes)
21	MF	POR	Filipe Teixeira (to Académica)

No.	Pos.	Nation	Player
27	FW	FRA	Alioune Touré (to Leiria)
28	FW	SCG	Danijel Ljuboja (on loan to Stuttgart)
29	FW	NGA	Bartholomew Ogbeche (to Al-Jazira)

== Competitions ==
=== Overview ===
Competition	First match	Last match	Starting round	Final position	Record							
Competition	First match	Last match	Starting round	Final position	Pld	W	D	L	GF	GA	GD	Win %
Ligue 1	29 July 2005	13 May 2006	Matchday 1	9th	38	13	13	12	44	38	+6	34.21
Coupe de France	7 January 2005	29 April 2006	Round of 64	Winners	6	6	0	0	14	3	+11	100.00
Coupe de la Ligue	26 October 2005	21 December 2005	Round of 32	Round of 16	2	1	0	1	4	3	+1	50.00
Total					46	20	13	13	62	44	+18	43.48

Source: Competitions

=== Ligue 1 ===
==== League table ====
Pos	Team	Pld	W	D	L	GF	GA	GD	Pts	Qualification or relegation
7	Rennes	38	18	5	15	48	49	−1	59	
8	Nice	38	16	10	12	36	31	+5	58	
9	Paris Saint-Germain	38	13	13	12	44	38	+6	52	Qualification to UEFA Cup first round (Note: Paris Saint-Germain was qualified for the 2006–07 UEFA Cup as winners of the 2005–06 Coupe de France.)
10	Monaco	38	13	13	12	42	36	+6	52	
11	Le Mans	38	13	13	12	33	36	−3	52	

Source: Ligue 1
Rules for classification: 1) points; 2) goal difference; 3) number of goals scored.

==== Results summary ====
Overall								Home						Away					
Pld	W	D	L	GF	GA	GD	Pts	W	D	L	GF	GA	GD	W	D	L	GF	GA	GD
38	13	13	12	44	38	+6	52	11	3	5	34	20	+14	2	10	7	10	18	−8

Source: LFP.fr

==== Results by match ====
Match	1	2	3	4	5	6	7	8	9	10	11	12	13	14	15	16	17	18	19	20	21	22	23	24	25	26	27	28	29	30	31	32	33	34	35	36	37	38
Ground	H	A	H	A	H	H	A	H	A	H	A	H	A	H	A	H	A	H	A	H	A	H	A	A	H	A	H	A	H	A	H	A	H	A	H	A	H	A
Result	W	W	W	D	L	W	L	W	D	W	L	W	L	D	W	L	L	W	D	W	L	W	L	D	D	D	L	D	D	D	W	D	W	D	L	D	L	L
Position	1	2	1	1	3	2	4	2	2	2	2	2	4	4	2	4	6	4	6	3	4	4	5	5	6	6	6	8	7	10	8	8	8	8	8	8	9	9

Source: LFP.fr
A = Away; H = Home; W = Win; D = Draw; L = Loss

==== Matches ====
29 July 2005 1	Paris Saint-Germain	4–1	Metz	Paris
20:45	Kalou 6'; Cissé 37'; Rothen 48'; Landrin 77'	Report	Ahn 67'	Stadium: Parc des Princes; Attendance: 42,844; Referee: Philippe Malige

6 August 2005 2	Sochaux	0–1	Paris Saint-Germain	Montbéliard
20:00		Report	Cissé 52'	Stadium: Stade Auguste-Bonal; Attendance: 17,543; Referee: Laurent Duhamel

13 August 2005 3	Paris Saint-Germain	2–0	Toulouse	Paris
17:15	Pauleta 43', 61'	Report	Bergougnoux (red card) 30'	Stadium: Parc des Princes; Attendance: 41,341; Referee: Philippe Kalt

21 August 2005 4	Troyes	1–1	Paris Saint-Germain	Troyes
20:45	Dallet 49'	Report	Pauleta 36'; Cissé (yellow card) 16' (yellow-red card) 56'	Stadium: Stade de l'Aube; Attendance: 17,507; Referee: Éric Poulat

27 August 2005 5	Paris Saint-Germain	1–2	Nice	Paris
20:00	Pauleta 2'; Armand (red card) 90'	Report	Rozehnal 73' (o.g.); Bagayoko 88'	Stadium: Parc des Princes; Attendance: 43,475; Referee: Bertrand Layec

10 September 2005 6	Paris Saint-Germain	1–0	Strasbourg	Paris
20:00	Kalou 28'	Report	Abd Rabo (yellow card) 25' (yellow-red card) 65'	Stadium: Parc des Princes; Attendance: 40,748; Referee: Damien Ledentu

18 September 2005 7	Saint-Étienne	3–0	Paris Saint-Germain	Saint-Étienne
21:00	F. Mendy 38'; Piquionne 53'; Feindouno 79'	Report		Stadium: Stade Geoffroy-Guichard; Attendance: 27,771; Referee: Alain Sars

21 September 2005 8	Paris Saint-Germain	2–1	Lille	Paris
20:45	Pauleta 14', 54'	Report	Fauvergue 4'	Stadium: Parc des Princes; Attendance: 35,889; Referee: Bruno Coué

24 September 2005 9	Le Mans	0–0	Paris Saint-Germain	Le Mans
20:00		Report		Stadium: Stade Léon-Bollée; Attendance: 14,728; Referee: Fredy Fautrel

1 October 2005 10	Paris Saint-Germain	2–0	Nantes	Paris
17:15	Yepes 66'; Pauleta 73'; Cissé (yellow card) 44' (yellow-red card) 47'	Report	Leray (yellow card) 19' (yellow-red card) 87'	Stadium: Parc des Princes; Attendance: 42,164; Referee: Stéphane Moulin

16 October 2005 11	Marseille	1–0	Paris Saint-Germain	Marseille
21:00	Cana 78'	Report		Stadium: Stade Vélodrome; Attendance: 54,260; Referee: Éric Poulat

22 October 2005 12	Paris Saint-Germain	1–0	Nancy	Paris
20:00	Kalou 53'	Report		Stadium: Parc des Princes; Attendance: 40,140; Referee: Saïd Ennjimi

30 October 2005 13	Auxerre	2–0	Paris Saint-Germain	Auxerre
20:45	Cissé 52' (o.g.); Pieroni 86'	Report		Stadium: Stade de l'Abbé-Deschamps; Attendance: 19,980; Referee: Philippe Malige

6 November 2005 14	Paris Saint-Germain	0–0	Monaco	Paris
20:45		Report		Stadium: Parc des Princes; Attendance: 43,555; Referee: Alain Sars

20 November 2005 15	Bordeaux	0–2	Paris Saint-Germain	Bordeaux
20:45		Report	Yepes 36'; Pauleta 51'	Stadium: Stade Chaban-Delmas; Attendance: 32,204; Referee: Bruno Coué

27 November 2005 16	Paris Saint-Germain	3–4	Lens	Paris
18:00	Pauleta 7', 89'; Yepes 90+2'	Report	Thomert 2'; Dindane 33', 70'; Jussiê 41'	Stadium: Parc des Princes; Attendance: 40,895; Referee: Stéphane Bré

3 December 2005 17	Lyon	2–0	Paris Saint-Germain	Lyon
17:15	Fred 5'; Carew 90'	Report		Stadium: Stade de Gerland; Attendance: 38,134; Referee: Bertrand Layec

10 December 2005 18	Paris Saint-Germain	2–0	Rennes	Paris
20:00	Pauleta 39', 63'	Report		Stadium: Parc des Princes; Attendance: 37,747; Referee: Bruno Ruffray

17 December 2005 19	Ajaccio	1–1	Paris Saint-Germain	Ajaccio
17:15	Rocchi 44'	Report	Kalou 41'	Stadium: Stade François Coty; Attendance: 3,672; Referee: Thierry Auriac

4 January 2006 20	Paris Saint-Germain	3–1	Sochaux	Paris
20:30	Landrin 28'; Pancrate 57'; Pauleta 74'	Report	Sène 55'	Stadium: Parc des Princes; Attendance: 36,806; Referee: Tony Chapron

12 January 2006 21	Toulouse	1–0	Paris Saint-Germain	Toulouse
21:00	Moreira 87'	Report		Stadium: Stadium de Toulouse; Attendance: 19,609; Referee: Alain Sars

15 January 2006 22	Paris Saint-Germain	2–1	Troyes	Paris
18:00	Pauleta 45' (pen.); Pancrate 90'	Report	Ba 55'	Stadium: Parc des Princes; Attendance: 35,118; Referee: Philippe Kalt

21 January 2006 23	Nice	1–0	Paris Saint-Germain	Nice
20:00	Traoré 87'	Report		Stadium: Stade du Ray; Attendance: 11,941; Referee: Laurent Duhamel

4 February 2006 25	Paris Saint-Germain	2–2	Saint-Étienne	Paris
17:15	Pauleta 31'; Pancrate 81'	Report	Piquionne 16'; Postiga 34'	Stadium: Parc des Princes; Attendance: 43,026; Referee: Stéphane Lannoy

8 February 2006 24	Strasbourg	1–1	Paris Saint-Germain	Strasbourg
20:00	Diané 13'	Report	Pauleta 31'	Stadium: Stade de la Meinau; Attendance: 17,732; Referee: Thierry Auriac

12 February 2006 26	Lille	0–0	Paris Saint-Germain	Villeneuve-d'Ascq
21:00		Report		Stadium: Stadium Nord Lille Métropole; Attendance: 13,392; Referee: Éric Poulat

18 February 2006 27	Paris Saint-Germain	0–1	Le Mans	Paris
20:00		Report	Fauré 5'	Stadium: Parc des Princes; Attendance: 39,655; Referee: Olivier Thual

25 February 2006 28	Nantes	0–0	Paris Saint-Germain	Nantes
17:15		Report	Armand (yellow card) 50' (yellow-red card) 70'	Stadium: Stade de la Beaujoire; Attendance: 32,691; Referee: Laurent Duhamel

5 March 2006 29	Paris Saint-Germain	0–0	Marseille	Paris
17:00		Report		Stadium: Parc des Princes; Attendance: 43,906; Referee: Alain Sars

11 March 2006 30	Nancy	1–1	Paris Saint-Germain	Tomblaine
17:15	Brison 24'	Report	Kalou 76'	Stadium: Stade Marcel Picot; Attendance: 17,631; Referee: Fredy Fautrel

19 March 2006 31	Paris Saint-Germain	4–1	Auxerre	Paris
20:45	Kalou 26', 57'; Bolf 37' (o.g.); Pauleta 55'	Report	Mathis 60'	Stadium: Parc des Princes; Attendance: 35,528; Referee: Claude Colombo

26 March 2006 32	Monaco	1–1	Paris Saint-Germain	Fontvieille
20:45	Chevantón 52'	Report	Paulo César 15'	Stadium: Stade Louis II; Attendance: 11,668; Referee: Thierry Auriac

2 April 2006 33	Paris Saint-Germain	3–1	Bordeaux	Paris
20:45	Pauleta 6', 38' (pen.), 42'	Report	Perea 22'	Stadium: Parc des Princes; Attendance: 41,913; Referee: Tony Chapron

8 April 2006 34	Lens	1–1	Paris Saint-Germain	Lens
17:15	Jussiê 90' (pen.)	Report	Kalou 77'; Yepes (red card) 90'	Stadium: Stade Félix Bollaert; Attendance: 39,513; Referee: Bertrand Layec

16 April 2006 35	Paris Saint-Germain	0–1	Lyon	Paris
21:00		Report	Fred 24'	Stadium: Parc des Princes; Attendance: 43,128; Referee: Stéphane Bré

3 May 2006 36	Rennes	1–1	Paris Saint-Germain	Rennes
20:45	Källström 71' (pen.)	Report	Kalou 90'	Stadium: Stade de la Route de Lorient; Attendance: 28,425; Referee: Alain Sars

6 May 2006 37	Paris Saint-Germain	2–4	Ajaccio	Paris
20:00	Yepes 30'; Pauleta 52'	Report	Chafni 19', 60'; Abdoun 58'; Scarpelli 90+1'	Stadium: Parc des Princes; Attendance: 41,361; Referee: Bruno Ruffray

13 May 2006 38	Metz	1–0	Paris Saint-Germain	Metz
20:00	Huszti 87'	Report		Stadium: Stade Saint-Symphorien; Attendance: 15,807; Referee: Bertrand Layec

=== Coupe de France ===
7 January 2006 Round of 64	Vermelles	0–4	Paris Saint-Germain	Lens
17:30			Pauleta 9'; Armand 50'; Bueno 80'; Rodríguez 84'; Dhorasoo (yellow card); M'Bami (yellow card)	Stadium: Stade Félix-Bollaert; Attendance: 15,311; Referee: Jean-Charles Cailleux

1 February 2006 Round of 32	Paris Saint-Germain	1–0	Auxerre	Paris
17:00	Grichting 75' (o.g.)			Stadium: Parc des Princes; Attendance: 18,000; Referee: Stéphane Bré

14 March 2006 Round of 16	Lyon-Duchère	0–3	Paris Saint-Germain	Lyon
20:30	Chérif (yellow card) 50'; Damiani (yellow card) 65'		Bueno 29'; Pauleta 75', 77'	Stadium: Stade de Gerland; Attendance: 9,000; Referee: Damien Ledentu

11 April 2006 Quarter-finals	Paris Saint-Germain	2–1	Lille	Paris
18:15	Kalou (yellow card) 26' (goal) 40'; Pauleta 57' (yellow card) 90'; Pancrate (yellow card) 59'; Cissé (yellow card) 76'		Tavlaridis 30' (yellow card) 37'; Bodmer (yellow card) 87'	Stadium: Parc des Princes; Attendance: 21,345; Referee: Claude Colombo

20 April 2006 Semi-finals	Nantes	1–2	Paris Saint-Germain	Nantes
20:45	Diallo (yellow card) 47'; Faé (yellow card) 69'; Cetto 72'		Pancrate 68'; Pauleta (yellow card) 56' (goal) 86'; Mendy (yellow card) 75'	Stadium: Stade de la Beaujoire; Attendance: 35,968; Referee: Damien Ledentu

29 April 2006 Final	Marseille	1–2	Paris Saint-Germain	Paris
20:45	Oruma (yellow card) 43'; Maoulida 67'; Taiwo (yellow card) 82'	Report	Kalou 5'; M'Bami (yellow card) 43'; Dhorasoo 49'; Armand (yellow card) 53'; Pauleta (yellow card) 82'; Letizi (yellow card) 84'	Stadium: Stade de France; Attendance: 79,061; Referee: Laurent Duhamel

=== Coupe de la Ligue ===
26 October 2005 Round of 32	Paris Saint-Germain	4–1	Troyes	Paris
21:00	Cissé 8'; Pauleta 47', 58'; Yepes (yellow card) 68'; Badiane 79'	Report	Kouassi (yellow card) 58'; Nivet 90' (pen.)	Stadium: Parc des Princes; Attendance: 20,399; Referee: Olivier Thual

21 December 2005 Round of 16	Toulouse	2–0	Paris Saint-Germain	Toulouse
17:00	Mansaré 87'; Moreira 90' (pen.)	Report	Pichot (yellow card) 50'	Stadium: Stadium Municipal; Attendance: 17,132; Referee: Stéphane Lannoy
