= 2004–05 Paris Saint-Germain FC season =

35th season in existence of Paris Saint-Germain

Paris Saint-Germain
2004–05 season
- President: Francis Graille (until 2 May 2005); Pierre Blayau (from 2 May 2005)
- Head coach: Vahid Halilhodžić (until 8 February 2005); Laurent Fournier (from 9 February 2005)
- Stadium: Parc des Princes
- Ligue 1: 9th
- Coupe de France: Round of 16
- Coupe de la Ligue: Third round
- Trophée des Champions: Runners-up
- UEFA Champions League: Group stage
- Top goalscorer: League: Pauleta (14); All: Pauleta (19)
- Highest home attendance: 43,904 (vs Rennes, 28 May 2005)
- Lowest home attendance: 32,814 (vs Caen, 14 August 2004)
- Average home league attendance: 35,369
Home colours	Away colours	Third colours

The 2004–05 season was Paris Saint-Germain's 35th season in existence. PSG played their home league games at the Parc des Princes in Paris, registering an average attendance of 35,369 spectators per match. The club was presided by Francis Graille until 2 May 2005, when Pierre Blayau became the new president. The team was coached by Vahid Halilhodžić until 8 February 2005, when Laurent Fournier replaced him. José-Karl Pierre-Fanfan was the team captain.

== Season summary ==
The season before, PSG had won the Coupe de France and finished second in Ligue 1, just three points away from title glory. However, manager Vahid Halilhodžić's second season at the club was not a success. From their opening Champions League group stage 0–3 home loss to Chelsea, to their poor domestic form, PSG never looked like replicating the winning form of the previous season. Going into the final round of Champions League group stage fixtures in December, the team still had a chance of advancing to the knockout stage. The club, however, suffered a disappointing 1–3 defeat at home, courtesy of a Sergei Semak hat-trick, which meant straight elimination from Europe. It was a bitter loss that even prompted club president Francis Graille to publicly relay his disappointment at the "lack of pride" shown by the squad, though remaining guardedly coy when explicitly asked about Halilhodžić's future at the club.

With only domestic competition to worry about, PSG began 2005 looking to improve its league standing. Sluggish form continued, however, and on 8 February, following a 2–0 home defeat versus Lens that saw PSG drop to 12th, the club's management decided to sack Halilhodžić. He was replaced by the coach of the reserves team, Laurent Fournier, under whom the club eventually finished ninth in the league.

Following the conclusion of the season, Sochaux's Guy Lacombe was appointed as manager.

== Players ==
As of the 2004–05 season.

=== Squad ===
Note: Flags indicate national team as defined under FIFA eligibility rules; some limited exceptions apply. Players may hold more than one non-FIFA nationality.

No.	Pos.	Nation	Player
1	GK	FRA	Lionel Letizi
2	DF	FRA	Stéphane Pichot
5	DF	FRA	Bernard Mendy
6	DF	COL	Mario Yepes
7	MF	FRA	Fabrice Pancrate
8	FW	BRA	Reinaldo
9	FW	POR	Pauleta
10	MF	SCG	Branko Bošković (Note: Bošković was born in Bačka Topola, SFR Yugoslavia (now Serbia), and represented Serbia and Montenegro internationally following Yugoslavia's dissolution, but also qualified to represent Montenegro internationally after they declared independence and would make his international debut for Montenegro in March 2007.)
11	MF	RUS	Sergei Semak (Note: Semak was born in Sychanske, Soviet Union (now Ukraine), but also qualified to represent Russia internationally and made his international debut for Russia in 1997.)
13	MF	TUN	Hocine Ragued (Note: Ragued was born in Paris, France, but also qualified to represent Tunisia internationally and represented them at U-23 level before making his international debut for Tunisia in 2006.)
14	MF	FRA	Édouard Cissé
16	GK	FRA	Jérôme Alonzo
17	DF	CMR	Jean-Hugues Ateba
18	MF	TUN	Selim Benachour (Note: Benachour was born in Paris, France, but also qualified to represent Tunisia internationally and made his international debut for Tunisia in 2002.)
19	MF	ALB	Lorik Cana (Note: Cana was born in Pristina, SFR Yugoslavia (now Kosovo, but part of Serbia and Montenegro during 2004–05), but also qualified to represent Albania, Switzerland, and France internationally, and made his international debut for Albania in June 2003.)

No.	Pos.	Nation	Player
20	DF	POR	Hélder (Note: Hélder was born in Luanda, Angola, but also qualified to represent Portugal internationally and made his international debut for Portugal in February 1992.)
21	MF	POR	Filipe Teixeira (Note: Teixeira was born in Paris, France, but also qualified to represent Portugal internationally through his parents and represented Portugal at U-18 and U-21 level.)
22	DF	FRA	Sylvain Armand
23	MF	CMR	Modeste M'bami
24	DF	FRA	José-Karl Pierre-Fanfan (captain)
25	MF	FRA	Jérôme Rothen
26	DF	FRA	Jean-Michel Badiane
27	MF	MTQ	Charles-Édouard Coridon
28	FW	SCG	Danijel Ljuboja (Note: Ljuboja was born in Vinkovci, SFR Yugoslavia (now Croatia), but also qualified to represent Serbia and Montenegro internationally and made his international debut for Serbia and Montenegro in 2003.)
30	GK	ALG	Mohamed Benhamou (Note: Benhamou was born in Paris, France, but also qualified to represent Algeria internationally and made his international debut for Algeria in 2004.)
33	DF	CIV	Sol Bamba (Note: Bamba was born in Ivry-sur-Seine, France, but also qualified to represent Ivory Coast internationally through his parents and represented Ivory Coast at U-20 and U-23 level before making his international debut for Ivory Coast in 2008.)
35	GK	FRA	Nicolas Cousin
—	DF	SEN	Boukary Dramé (Note: Dramé was born in Villepinte, France, but also qualified to represent Senegal internationally and made his international debut for Senegal in 2005.)
—	DF	FRA	Youness Bengelloun
—	MF	FRA	Rudy Haddad

=== Left club during season ===
Note: Flags indicate national team as defined under FIFA eligibility rules; some limited exceptions apply. Players may hold more than one non-FIFA nationality.

No.	Pos.	Nation	Player
11	MF	FRA	Fabrice Fiorèse (to Marseille)
12	FW	NGR	Bartholomew Ogbeche (on loan to Metz)

No.	Pos.	Nation	Player
15	FW	BIH	Vedad Ibišević (to Dijon)
21	MF	FRA	Romain Rocchi (on loan to Bastia)

== Competitions ==
=== Overview ===
Competition	First match	Last match	Starting round	Final position	Record							
Competition	First match	Last match	Starting round	Final position	Pld	W	D	L	GF	GA	GD	Win %
Ligue 1	7 August 2004	28 May 2005	Matchday 1	9th	38	12	15	11	40	41	−1	31.58
Coupe de France	8 January 2005	2 March 2005	Round of 64	Round of 16	4	3	0	1	11	5	+6	75.00
Coupe de la Ligue	10 November 2004	21 December 2004	Round of 32	Round of 16	2	1	0	1	3	3	+0	50.00
Trophée des Champions	31 July 2004		Final	Runners-up	1	0	1	0	1	1	+0	0.00
UEFA Champions League	14 September 2004	7 December 2004	Group stage	Group stage	6	1	2	3	3	8	−5	16.67
Total					51	17	18	16	58	58	+0	33.33

Source: Competitions

=== Trophée des Champions ===
31 July 2004	Paris Saint-Germain	1–1 (6–7 p)	Lyon	Cannes
20:45	Fiorèse 71'	Report	Élber 54'	Stadium: Stade Pierre de Coubertin; Attendance: 9,429; Referee: Gilles Veissière
	Penalties
	Pauleta (penalty scored); Rothen (penalty scored); Yepes (penalty scored); Armand (penalty missed); Mendy (penalty scored); Cissé (penalty scored); Benachour (penalty scored); Touré (penalty missed)		(penalty scored) Bergougnoux; (penalty scored) Viale; (penalty missed) Malouda; (penalty scored) Balmont; (penalty scored) Juninho; (penalty scored) Essien; (penalty scored) Abidal; (penalty scored) Berthod

=== Ligue 1 ===
==== League table ====
Pos	Team	Pld	W	D	L	GF	GA	GD	Pts	Qualification or relegation
7	Lens	38	13	13	12	45	39	+6	52	Qualification to Intertoto Cup second round
8	Auxerre	38	14	10	14	48	47	+1	52	Qualification to UEFA Cup first round (Note: Auxerre was qualified for the 2005–06 UEFA Cup as winners of the 2004–05 Coupe de France.)
9	Paris Saint-Germain	38	12	15	11	40	41	−1	51	
10	Sochaux	38	13	11	14	42	41	+1	50	
11	Strasbourg	38	12	12	14	42	43	−1	48	Qualification to UEFA Cup first round (Note: Strasbourg was qualified for the 2005–06 UEFA Cup as winners of the 2004–05 Coupe de la Ligue.)

Source: Ligue 1
Rules for classification: 1) points; 2) goal difference; 3) number of goals scored.

==== Results summary ====
Overall								Home						Away					
Pld	W	D	L	GF	GA	GD	Pts	W	D	L	GF	GA	GD	W	D	L	GF	GA	GD
38	12	15	11	40	41	−1	51	9	8	2	24	15	+9	3	7	9	16	26	−10

Source: LFP.fr

==== Results by match ====
Match	1	2	3	4	5	6	7	8	9	10	11	12	13	14	15	16	17	18	19	20	21	22	23	24	25	26	27	28	29	30	31	32	33	34	35	36	37	38
Ground	A	H	A	H	A	H	A	H	A	A	H	A	H	A	H	A	H	A	H	A	H	A	H	A	H	A	H	H	A	H	A	H	A	H	A	H	A	H
Result	L	D	L	D	D	L	D	W	W	L	W	D	W	L	D	D	D	W	W	D	D	D	D	L	L	L	W	W	L	W	D	D	W	W	L	D	L	W
Position	13	14	14	14	14	17	18	16	16	16	14	14	10	12	12	12	12	11	10	10	9	9	10	11	12	13	12	12	12	12	11	11	10	7	8	9	10	9

Source: LFP.fr
A = Away; H = Home; W = Win; D = Draw; L = Loss

==== Matches ====
7 August 2004 1	Rennes	2–1	Paris Saint-Germain	Rennes
20:00	Sorlin 22'; Frei 23'	Report	Pauleta 40' (pen.)	Stadium: Stade de la Route de Lorient; Attendance: 25,150; Referee: Alain Hamer

14 August 2004 2	Paris Saint-Germain	2–2	Caen	Paris
17:15	Fiorèse 8'; Yepes 56'; Yepes (red card) 89'	Report	Hengbart 43'; Sarr 72' (pen.)	Stadium: Parc des Princes; Attendance: 32,814; Referee: Olivier Thual

21 August 2004 3	Toulouse	2–1	Paris Saint-Germain	Toulouse
20:00	Moreira 55'; Eduardo 70'	Report	Reinaldo 75'	Stadium: Stadium de Toulouse; Attendance: 34,080; Referee: Alain Sars

29 August 2004 4	Paris Saint-Germain	2–2	Saint-Étienne	Paris
18:00	Pauleta 69' (pen.); Ogbeche 74'	Report	Piquionne 64', 86'	Stadium: Parc des Princes; Attendance: 41,763; Referee: Damien Ledentu

11 September 2004 5	Istres	1–1	Paris Saint-Germain	Nîmes
20:00	Saïfi 2'	Report	Pauleta 68' (pen.)	Stadium: Stade des Costières; Attendance: 10,512; Referee: Philippe Kalt

19 September 2004 6	Paris Saint-Germain	0–1	Monaco	Paris
21:00		Report	Adebayor 82'	Stadium: Parc des Princes; Attendance: 40,039; Referee: Stéphane Bré

22 September 2004 7	Lens	2–2	Paris Saint-Germain	Lens
20:30	Bąk 81'; Hilton 86'	Report	Cana 44'; Pancrate 76'	Stadium: Stade Félix Bollaert; Attendance: 36,649; Referee: Éric Poulat

25 September 2004 8	Paris Saint-Germain	1–0	Strasbourg	Paris
20:00	Pauleta 78'	Report		Stadium: Parc des Princes; Attendance: 32,935; Referee: Bruno Ruffray

2 October 2004 9	Bastia	1–2	Paris Saint-Germain	Furiani
20:00	Hadji 17'	Report	Reinaldo 28'; Pancrate 29'	Stadium: Stade Armand-Cesari; Attendance: 7,164; Referee: Gilles Veissière

16 October 2004 10	Nantes	1–0	Paris Saint-Germain	Nantes
20:00	Savinaud 88' (pen.)	Report		Stadium: Stade de la Beaujoire; Attendance: 35,232; Referee: Laurent Duhamel

23 October 2004 11	Paris Saint-Germain	1–0	Ajaccio	Paris
20:00	Pancrate 10'	Report		Stadium: Parc des Princes; Attendance: 35,487; Referee: Dominique Fraise

30 October 2004 12	Auxerre	1–1	Paris Saint-Germain	Auxerre
20:00	Kalou 58'	Report	Pauleta 35'; Ibišević (red card) 88'	Stadium: Stade de l'Abbé-Deschamps; Attendance: 20,736; Referee: Alain Sars

7 November 2004 13	Paris Saint-Germain	2–1	Marseille	Paris
21:00	Pauleta 32'; Cissé 69'; Armand (red card) 20'	Report	Batlles 41'	Stadium: Parc des Princes; Attendance: 43,131; Referee: Gilles Veissière

13 November 2004 14	Bordeaux	3–0	Paris Saint-Germain	Bordeaux
20:00	Pichot 6' (o.g.); Laslandes 48'; Rool 76'	Report		Stadium: Stade Chaban-Delmas; Attendance: 31,988; Referee: Bertrand Layec

19 November 2004 15	Paris Saint-Germain	0–0	Lyon	Paris
21:00	Yepes (yellow card) 12' (yellow-red card) 22'	Report		Stadium: Parc des Princes; Attendance: 42,478; Referee: Alain Sars

28 November 2004 16	Nice	1–1	Paris Saint-Germain	Nice
21:00	Traoré 68' (pen.)	Report	Pancrate 68' (pen.); Cissé (yellow card) 61' (yellow-red card) 64'	Stadium: Stade du Ray; Attendance: 11,760; Referee: Philippe Kalt

4 December 2004 17	Paris Saint-Germain	1–1	Lille	Paris
17:15	Reinaldo 33'	Report	Bodmer 16'	Stadium: Parc des Princes; Attendance: 36,940; Referee: Laurent Duhamel

12 December 2004 18	Sochaux	1–2	Paris Saint-Germain	Montbéliard
21:00	Santos 74'	Report	Pauleta 24', 41'	Stadium: Stade Auguste-Bonal; Attendance: 17,209; Referee: Stéphane Bré

18 December 2004 19	Paris Saint-Germain	3–0	Metz	Paris
20:00	Méniri 39' (o.g.); Pauleta 68' (pen.); Pancrate 74'	Report		Stadium: Parc des Princes; Attendance: 36,881; Referee: Alain Hamer

12 January 2005 20	Caen	0–0	Paris Saint-Germain	Caen
18:00		Report		Stadium: Stade Michel d'Ornano; Attendance: 20,930; Referee: Gilles Veissière

15 January 2005 21	Paris Saint-Germain	0–0	Toulouse	Paris
20:00	Cana (yellow card) 59' (yellow-red card) 72'	Report		Stadium: Parc des Princes; Attendance: 37,559; Referee: Philippe Malige

22 January 2005 22	Saint-Étienne	0–0	Paris Saint-Germain	Saint-Étienne
20:00	Sablé (yellow card) 73' (yellow-red card) 89'	Report	Mendy (yellow card) 23' (yellow-red card) 75'	Stadium: Stade Geoffroy-Guichard; Attendance: 31,672; Referee: Stéphane Lannoy

26 January 2005 23	Paris Saint-Germain	2–2	Istres	Paris
20:30	Hélder 30'; Pauleta 52'	Report	Bakayoko 61' (pen.); Pelé 81'	Stadium: Parc des Princes; Attendance: 29,445; Referee: Dominique Fraise

30 January 2005 24	Monaco	2–0	Paris Saint-Germain	Fontvieille
21:00	Kallon 36'; Bernardi 56'	Report		Stadium: Stade Louis II; Attendance: 12,147; Referee: Éric Poulat

6 February 2005 25	Paris Saint-Germain	0–2	Lens	Paris
21:00		Report	Diarra 41'; Leroy 45'	Stadium: Parc des Princes; Attendance: 34,111; Referee: Thierry Auriac

19 February 2005 26	Strasbourg	3–1	Paris Saint-Germain	Strasbourg
17:15	Niang 20'; Pagis 36' (pen.); Abdessadki 60'	Report	Lacour 82' (o.g.)	Stadium: Stade de la Meinau; Attendance: 16,987; Referee: Bruno Coué

26 February 2005 27	Paris Saint-Germain	1–0	Bastia	Paris
20:00	Benachour 66' (pen.)	Report		Stadium: Parc des Princes; Referee: Claude Colombo

5 March 2005 28	Paris Saint-Germain	1–0	Nantes	Paris
20:00	Pauleta 88' (pen.)	Report		Stadium: Parc des Princes; Attendance: 33,737; Referee: Damien Ledentu

12 March 2005 29	Ajaccio	1–0	Paris Saint-Germain	Ajaccio
20:00	André Luiz 15' (pen.)	Report		Stadium: Stade François Coty; Attendance: 2,557; Referee: Thierry Auriac

20 March 2005 30	Paris Saint-Germain	1–0	Auxerre	Paris
18:00	Pauleta 7'	Report		Stadium: Parc des Princes; Attendance: 35,896; Referee: Laurent Duhamel

3 April 2005 31	Marseille	1–1	Paris Saint-Germain	Marseille
21:00	Batlles 74'	Report	Nakata 46' (o.g.)	Stadium: Stade Vélodrome; Attendance: 56,087; Referee: Éric Poulat

9 April 2005 32	Paris Saint-Germain	1–1	Bordeaux	Paris
20:00	Ljuboja 32'	Report	Meriem 72' (pen.)	Stadium: Parc des Princes; Attendance: 39,433; Referee: Bruno Coué

17 April 2005 33	Lyon	0–1	Paris Saint-Germain	Lyon
21:00		Report	Ljuboja 44'	Stadium: Stade de Gerland; Attendance: 37,864; Referee: Claude Colombo

22 April 2005 34	Paris Saint-Germain	3–1	Nice	Paris
20:00	Pauleta 39' (pen.); Rothen 43'; Semak 85'	Report	Armand 90' (o.g.)	Stadium: Parc des Princes; Attendance: 36,098; Referee: Pascal Viléo

7 May 2005 35	Lille	1–0	Paris Saint-Germain	Lille
20:00	Mirallas 85'	Report		Stadium: Stadium Nord Lille Métropole; Attendance: 16,823; Referee: Tony Chapron

14 May 2005 36	Paris Saint-Germain	2–2	Sochaux	Paris
20:00	Armand 88'; Yepes 89'	Report	Santos 48', 57'	Stadium: Parc des Princes; Attendance: 39,959; Referee: Bruno Ruffray

21 May 2005 37	Metz	3–2	Paris Saint-Germain	Metz
20:45	Signorino 7'; Obraniak 26'; Tum 73'	Report	Pierre-Fanfan 51'; Yepes 57'	Stadium: Stade Saint-Symphorien; Attendance: 23,874; Referee: Bruno Coué

28 May 2005 38	Paris Saint-Germain	1–0	Rennes	Paris
20:00	Pauleta 52'	Report		Stadium: Parc des Princes; Attendance: 43,904; Referee: Laurent Duhamel

=== Coupe de France ===
8 January 2005 Round of 64	Langueux	1–6	Paris Saint-Germain	Guingamp
20:00	Briend 59'		Teixeira 4'; Pauleta 21', 29'; Reinaldo 61', 72'; Ljuboja 70'	Stadium: Stade de Roudourou; Attendance: 17,990; Referee: Yves Brizou

13 February 2005 Round of 32	Paris Saint-Germain	3–1 (a.e.t.)	Bordeaux	Paris
21:00	Mendy (yellow card) 17'; Reinaldo (yellow card) 45'; Yepes 86'; Pauleta 95', 117'		Chamakh 41' (yellow card) 40' (yellow-red card) 41'; Rool (yellow card) 45'; Jurietti (yellow card) 107'	Stadium: Parc des Princes; Attendance: 38,000; Referee: Gilles Veissière

2 March 2005 Round of 16	Auxerre	3–2	Paris Saint-Germain	Auxerre
20:45	Kalou 30', 76'; Akalé 79'; Mignot (yellow card) 25'; Kalou (yellow card) 90'		Pierre-Fanfan 3' (yellow card) 79'; Hélder (yellow card) 22'; Reinaldo 23'; Rothen (yellow card) 55'; Teixeira (yellow card) 83'	Stadium: Stade de l'Abbé-Deschamps; Attendance: 8,000; Referee: Bertrand Layec

=== Coupe de la Ligue ===
10 November 2004 Round of 32	Marseille	2–3	Paris Saint-Germain	Marseille
21:00	Pedretti (yellow card) 4'; Lizarazu (yellow card) 8'; Meïté (yellow card) 30'; Pedretti 38'; Bamogo 41' (pen.)	Report	Benachour (yellow card) 4'; Hélder (yellow card) 23'; Bošković 45', 53'; Ateba (yellow card) 47'; Pierre-Fanfan (yellow card) 59'; Mendy 89'	Stadium: Stade Vélodrome; Attendance: 54,281; Referee: Stéphane Bré

21 December 2004 Round of 16	Montpellier	1–0	Paris Saint-Germain	Montpellier
21:00	Godemèche (yellow card) 20'; Atik (yellow card) 40'; Mendy (yellow card) 57'; Mansaré 85' (pen.)	Report	Cana (yellow card) 13'; Cissé (yellow card) 43' (yellow-red card) 68'; Bošković (yellow card) 57'; Pichot (yellow card) 83'	Stadium: Stade de la Mosson; Attendance: 16,356; Referee: Pascal Viléo

=== UEFA Champions League ===
==== Group stage ====
Pos	Team	Pld	W	D	L	GF	GA	GD	Pts	Qualification
1	(England) Chelsea	6	4	1	1	10	3	+7	13	Advance to knockout stage
2	(Portugal) Porto	6	2	2	2	4	6	−2	8	Advance to knockout stage
3	(Russia) CSKA Moscow	6	2	1	3	5	5	0	7	Transfer to UEFA Cup
4	(France) Paris Saint-Germain	6	1	2	3	3	8	−5	5	

14 September 2004 1	Paris Saint-Germain (France)	0–3	(England) Chelsea	Paris, France
20:45		Report	Terry 29'; Drogba 45+1', 76'	Stadium: Parc des Princes; Attendance: 40,000; Referee: Manuel Mejuto González (Spain)

29 September 2004 2	CSKA Moscow (Russia)	2–0	(France) Paris Saint-Germain	Moscow, Russia
18:30	Semak 64'; Vágner Love 77' (pen.)	Report		Stadium: Lokomotiv Stadium; Attendance: 29,000; Referee: Massimo Busacca (Switzerland)

20 October 2004 3	Paris Saint-Germain (France)	2–0	(Portugal) Porto	Paris, France
20:45	Coridon 30'; Pauleta 31'	Report		Stadium: Parc des Princes; Attendance: 41,000; Referee: Pierluigi Collina (Italy)

2 November 2004 4	Porto (Portugal)	0–0	(France) Paris Saint-Germain	Porto, Portugal
20:45		Report		Stadium: Estádio do Dragão; Attendance: 30,210; Referee: Stuart Dougal (Scotland)

24 November 2004 5	Chelsea (England)	0–0	(France) Paris Saint-Germain	London, England
20:45		Report		Stadium: Stamford Bridge; Attendance: 39,626; Referee: René Temmink (Netherlands)

7 December 2004 6	Paris Saint-Germain (France)	1–3	(Russia) CSKA Moscow	Paris, France
20:45	Pancrate 37'	Report	Semak 28', 64', 70'	Stadium: Parc des Princes; Attendance: 40,000; Referee: Markus Merk (Germany)
