= 2006–07 Paris Saint-Germain FC season =

37th season in existence of Paris Saint-Germain

Paris Saint-Germain
2006–07 season
- President: Alain Cayzac
- Head coach: Guy Lacombe (until 15 January 2007); Paul Le Guen (from 15 January 2007)
- Stadium: Parc des Princes
- Ligue 1: 15th
- Coupe de France: Quarter-finals
- Coupe de la Ligue: Round of 16
- Trophée des Champions: Runners-up
- UEFA Cup: Round of 16
- Top goalscorer: League: Pauleta (15); All: Pauleta (24)
- Highest home attendance: 44,431 (vs Marseille, 10 September 2006)
- Lowest home attendance: 12,079 (vs Nîmes Olympique, 7 January 2007)
- Average home league attendance: 36,360
Home colours	Away colours	Third colours

The 2006–07 season was Paris Saint-Germain's 37th season in existence. PSG played their home league games at the Parc des Princes in Paris, registering an average attendance of 36,360 spectators per match. The club was presided by Alain Cayzac. The team was coached by Guy Lacombe until 15 January 2007, when Paul Le Guen replaced him. Pauleta was the team captain.

== Players ==
As of the 2006–07 season.

=== Squad ===
Note: Flags indicate national team as defined under FIFA eligibility rules; some limited exceptions apply. Players may hold more than one non-FIFA nationality.

No.	Pos.	Nation	Player
1	GK	FRA	Mickaël Landreau
4	DF	CZE	David Rozehnal
5	DF	FRA	Bernard Mendy
6	DF	COL	Mario Yepes
7	FW	FRA	Péguy Luyindula (Note: Luyindula was born in Kinshasa, Zaire (now the Democratic Republic of the Congo, but also qualified to represent France internationally and represented them at U-21 level before making his international debut for France in 2004.)
8	MF	FRA	Édouard Cissé
9	FW	POR	Pauleta (captain)
10	MF	ARG	Marcelo Gallardo
11	FW	CIV	Amara Diané
12	DF	FRA	Larrys Mabiala (Note: Mabiala was born in Montfermeil, France, and represented them at U-21 level, but also qualifies to represent the Democratic Republic of the Congo internationally and would make his international debut for the Democratic Republic of the Congo in 2008.)
13	FW	FRA	Pierre-Alain Frau
14	FW	FRA	David Ngog
15	MF	CIV	Bonaventure Kalou
16	GK	FRA	Jérôme Alonzo
17	DF	MLI	Sammy Traoré (Note: Traoré was born in Créteil, France, but also qualified to represent Mali internationally and made his international debut for Mali in 2001.)

No.	Pos.	Nation	Player
18	FW	FRA	Samuel Piètre
19	FW	FRA	Youssouf Mulumbu (Note: Mulumbu was born in Kinshasa, Zaire (now the Democratic Republic of the Congo, but also qualified to represent France internationally and represented them at U-20 and U-21 level before making his international debut for the Democratic Republic of the Congo in March 2008.)
20	MF	FRA	Clément Chantôme
21	MF	URU	Cristian Rodríguez
22	DF	FRA	Sylvain Armand
23	MF	FRA	Jérémy Clément
24	MF	FRA	David Hellebuyck
25	MF	FRA	Jérôme Rothen
26	DF	SEN	Boukary Dramé (Note: Dramé was born in Villepinte, France, but also qualified to represent Senegal internationally and made his international debut for Senegal in 2005.)
27	MF	CMR	Albert Baning
30	GK	FRA	Nicolas Cousin
31	DF	FRA	Jean-Yves Mvoto
32	FW	FRA	Yannick Boli
33	MF	FRA	Granddi Ngoyi (Note: Ngoyi was born in Melun, France, and represented them at U-21 and U-19 level, but also qualifies to represent the Democratic Republic of the Congo internationally and would make his international debut for the Democratic Republic of the Congo in July 2011.)
—	DF	FRA	Mamadou Sakho

=== Left club during season ===
Note: Flags indicate national team as defined under FIFA eligibility rules; some limited exceptions apply. Players may hold more than one non-FIFA nationality.

No.	Pos.	Nation	Player
7	MF	FRA	Fabrice Pancrate (on loan to Real Betis)
10	MF	FRA	Vikash Dhorasoo (sacked)
12	DF	CMR	Jean-Hugues Ateba (to Châteauroux)
19	FW	CIV	Franck Dja Djédjé (on loan to GF38)

No.	Pos.	Nation	Player
20	FW	URU	Carlos Bueno (on loan to Sporting CP)
23	MF	CMR	Modeste M'bami (to Marseille)
28	DF	BRA	Paulo César (to Toulouse)

== Competitions ==
=== Overview ===
Competition	First match	Last match	Starting round	Final position	Record							
Competition	First match	Last match	Starting round	Final position	Pld	W	D	L	GF	GA	GD	Win %
Ligue 1	4 August 2006	26 May 2007	Matchday 1	15th	38	12	12	14	42	42	+0	31.58
Coupe de France	7 January 2007	28 February 2007	Round of 64	Quarter-finals	4	3	0	1	6	2	+4	75.00
Coupe de la Ligue	20 September 2006	25 October 2006	Round of 32	Round of 16	2	1	0	1	4	3	+1	50.00
Trophée des Champions	30 July 2006		Final	Runners-up	1	0	1	0	1	1	+0	0.00
UEFA Cup	14 September 2006	15 March 2007	First round	Round of 16	10	5	3	2	15	8	+7	50.00
Total					55	21	16	18	68	56	+12	38.18

Source: Competitions

=== Trophée des Champions ===
30 July 2006 Final	Lyon	1–1 (5–4 p)	Paris Saint-Germain	Lyon
	Benzema 71' (pen.)		Rothen 62'	Stadium: Stade Gerland; Attendance: 30,529; Referee: Bertrand Layec
	Penalties
	Carew (penalty scored); Toulalan (penalty scored); Ben Arfa (penalty scored); Benzema (penalty scored); Diarra (penalty scored)		(penalty scored) Yepes; (penalty scored) Paulo César; (penalty scored) Frau; (penalty scored) Rothen; (penalty missed) Kalou

=== Ligue 1 ===
==== League table ====
Pos	Team	Pld	W	D	L	GF	GA	GD	Pts
13	Nancy	38	13	10	15	37	44	−7	49
14	Lorient	38	12	13	13	33	40	−7	49
15	Paris Saint-Germain	38	12	12	14	42	42	0	48
16	Nice	38	9	16	13	34	40	−6	43
17	Valenciennes	38	11	10	17	36	48	−12	43

Source: Ligue 1
Rules for classification: 1) points; 2) goal difference; 3) number of goals scored.

==== Results summary ====
Overall								Home						Away					
Pld	W	D	L	GF	GA	GD	Pts	W	D	L	GF	GA	GD	W	D	L	GF	GA	GD
38	12	12	14	42	42	0	48	7	5	7	24	23	+1	5	7	7	18	19	−1

Source: LFP.fr

==== Results by match ====
Match	1	2	3	4	5	6	7	8	9	10	11	12	13	14	15	16	17	18	19	20	21	22	23	24	25	26	27	28	29	30	31	32	33	34	35	36	37	38
Ground	H	A	H	A	H	A	H	A	H	A	H	H	A	H	A	H	A	H	A	H	A	H	A	H	A	H	A	H	A	A	H	A	H	A	H	A	H	A
Result	L	D	W	L	L	W	D	L	W	D	W	L	D	L	D	D	L	D	D	L	L	D	D	W	W	L	L	L	L	W	W	D	W	W	D	L	W	W
Position	13	13	10	12	15	14	13	14	12	13	10	12	12	14	13	13	14	15	15	17	17	16	17	16	15	17	18	19	19	17	16	17	15	15	15	15	15	15

Source: LFP.fr
A = Away; H = Home; W = Win; D = Draw; L = Loss

==== Matches ====
5 August 2006 1	Paris Saint-Germain	2–3	Lorient	Paris
20:00	Frau 21'; Pancrate 45+1'	Report	Fiorèse 31', 55'; Saïfi 73'	Stadium: Parc des Princes; Attendance: 36,215; Referee: Philippe Kalt

12 August 2006 2	Valenciennes	0–0	Paris Saint-Germain	Valenciennes
20:00		Report		Stadium: Stade Nungesser; Attendance: 16,301; Referee: Bruno Coué

19 August 2006 3	Paris Saint-Germain	1–0	Lille	Paris
20:00	Pauleta 60'	Report	Schmitz (red card) 64'	Stadium: Parc des Princes; Attendance: 35,077; Referee: Laurent Duhamel

26 August 2006 4	Sochaux	3–2	Paris Saint-Germain	Montbéliard
20:00	Ziani 30', 82' (pen.); Sène 36'	Report	Pauleta 70', 75'	Stadium: Stade Auguste-Bonal; Attendance: 16,317; Referee: Tony Chapron

10 September 2006 5	Paris Saint-Germain	1–3	Marseille	Paris
21:00	Pauleta 22' (pen.)	Report	Niang 7' (pen.); Nasri 67'; Pagis 88'	Stadium: Parc des Princes; Attendance: 44,431; Referee: Stéphane Bré

17 September 2006 6	Monaco	1–2	Paris Saint-Germain	Fontvieille
19:00	Kallon 33'	Report	Rozehnal 42'; Hellebuyck 54'	Stadium: Stade Louis II; Attendance: 12,433; Referee: Stéphane Lannoy

23 September 2006 7	Paris Saint-Germain	0–0	Nancy	Paris
20:00		Report		Stadium: Parc des Princes; Attendance: 34,103; Referee: Jean-Charles Cailleux

1 October 2006 8	Saint-Étienne	1–0	Paris Saint-Germain	Saint-Étienne
21:00	Ilan 38'	Report		Stadium: Stade Geoffroy-Guichard; Attendance: 25,734; Referee: Olivier Thual

14 October 2006 9	Paris Saint-Germain	4–2	Sedan	Paris
20:00	Frau 6', (red card) 42'; Yepes 49'; Pauleta 56', 72' (pen.)	Report	Marin 17'; Boutabout 90+3'	Stadium: Parc des Princes; Attendance: 36,329; Referee: Bruno Coué

22 October 2006 10	Auxerre	0–0	Paris Saint-Germain	Auxerre
17:30		Report		Stadium: Stade de l'Abbé-Deschamps; Attendance: 14,146; Referee: Eric Poulat

28 October 2006 11	Paris Saint-Germain	1–0	Rennes	Paris
20:00	Diané 44'; Pauleta (yellow card) 90+3' (yellow-red card) 90+4'	Report		Stadium: Parc des Princes; Attendance: 37,568; Referee: Bruno Ruffray

5 November 2006 12	Paris Saint-Germain	1–3	Lens	Paris
21:00	Armand 27'	Report	Cousin 50', 67'; Thomert 81'	Stadium: Parc des Princes; Attendance: 35,894; Referee: Thierry Auriac

11 November 2006 13	Le Mans	1–1	Paris Saint-Germain	Le Mans
20:00	Lucau 38'	Report	Kalou 11' (pen.)	Stadium: Stade Léon-Bollée; Attendance: 12,983; Referee: Damien Ledentu

18 November 2006 14	Paris Saint-Germain	0–2	Bordeaux	Paris
20:30		Report	Wendel 28'; Laslandes 87'	Stadium: Parc des Princes; Attendance: 38,394; Referee: Stéphane Lannoy

26 November 2006 15	Nantes	1–1	Paris Saint-Germain	Nantes
18:00	Da Rocha 75'	Report	Kalou 1'	Stadium: Stade de la Beaujoire; Attendance: 32,104; Referee: Bruno Coué

10 December 2006 17	Lyon	3–1	Paris Saint-Germain	Lyon
21:00	Wiltord 45'; Cris 87'; Malouda 88'	Report	Pauleta 60'	Stadium: Stade de Gerland; Attendance: 36,072; Referee: Alain Hamer

17 December 2006 18	Paris Saint-Germain	0–0	Nice	Paris
15:00		Report		Stadium: Parc des Princes; Attendance: 28,341; Referee: Eric Poulat

23 December 2006 19	Troyes	1–1	Paris Saint-Germain	Troyes
15:00	Ba 74'	Report	Diané 48'	Stadium: Stade de l'Aube; Attendance: 12,046; Referee: Laurent Duhamel

13 January 2007 20	Paris Saint-Germain	1–2	Valenciennes	Paris
15:00	Pauleta 90' (pen.)	Report	Savidan 61'; Roudet 88'; Paauwe (yellow card) 33' (yellow-red card) 50'	Stadium: Parc des Princes; Attendance: 27,866; Referee: Fredy Fautrel

17 January 2007 16	Paris Saint-Germain	0–0	Toulouse	Paris
20:30		Report		Stadium: Parc des Princes; Attendance: 29,158; Referee: Damien Ledentu

24 January 2007 21	Lille	1–0	Paris Saint-Germain	Villeneuve-d'Ascq
18:00	Makoun 75'	Report		Stadium: Stadium Nord Lille Métropole; Attendance: 12,950; Referee: Eric Poulat

27 January 2007 22	Paris Saint-Germain	0–0	Sochaux	Paris
20:00		Report		Stadium: Parc des Princes; Attendance: 33,119; Referee: Stéphane Bré

4 February 2007 23	Marseille	1–1	Paris Saint-Germain	Marseille
21:00	Cissé 68'	Report	Pauleta 74'	Stadium: Stade Vélodrome; Attendance: 56,592; Referee: Bertrand Layec

10 February 2007 24	Paris Saint-Germain	4–2	Monaco	Paris
17:10	Diané 5', 35'; Gallardo 82'; Rodríguez 86'	Report	Piquionne 50'; Koller 87'	Stadium: Parc des Princes; Attendance: 34,171; Referee: Olivier Thual

17 February 2007 25	Nancy	0–3	Paris Saint-Germain	Tomblaine
20:00	Kim (red card) 77'	Report	Pauleta 70'; Frau 86'; Gallardo 89'	Stadium: Stade Marcel Picot; Attendance: 19,252; Referee: Damien Ledentu

25 February 2007 26	Paris Saint-Germain	0–2	Saint-Étienne	Paris
21:00		Report	Perquis 32'; Ilan 44'	Stadium: Parc des Princes; Attendance: 38,857; Referee: Saïd Ennjimi

3 March 2007 27	Sedan	2–0	Paris Saint-Germain	Sedan
20:00	Landreau 7' (o.g.); Boutabout 74'	Report		Stadium: Stade Louis Dugauguez; Attendance: 15,851; Referee: Eric Poulat

11 March 2007 28	Paris Saint-Germain	0–1	Auxerre	Paris
18:00		Report	Kaboul 41'	Stadium: Parc des Princes; Attendance: 33,826; Referee: Jean-Charles Cailleux

18 March 2007 29	Rennes	1–0	Paris Saint-Germain	Rennes
21:00	Briand 76'	Report	Mendy (red card) 90+3'	Stadium: Stade de la Route de Lorient; Attendance: 27,085; Referee: Thierry Auriac

1 April 2007 30	Lens	1–2	Paris Saint-Germain	Lens
21:00	Rozehnal 52' (o.g.)	Report	Diané 2'; Armand 72'	Stadium: Stade Félix Bollaert; Attendance: 37,808; Referee: Bruno Coué

7 April 2007 31	Paris Saint-Germain	2–1	Le Mans	Paris
20:00	Luyindula 56'; Diané 80'	Report	Grafite 30'	Stadium: Parc des Princes; Attendance: 42,368; Referee: Philippe Malige

14 April 2007 32	Bordeaux	0–0	Paris Saint-Germain	Bordeaux
17:10		Report		Stadium: Stade Chaban-Delmas; Attendance: 31,731; Referee: Laurent Duhamel

21 April 2007 33	Paris Saint-Germain	4–0	Nantes	Paris
17:10	Pauleta 16', 65'; Rothen 45'; Luyindula 67'	Report		Stadium: Parc des Princes; Attendance: 42,744; Referee: Eric Poulat

28 April 2007 34	Toulouse	1–3	Paris Saint-Germain	Toulouse
17:10	Mansaré 8'	Report	Luyindula 32', (yellow card) 35' (yellow-red card) 82'; Cissé 44'; Rothen 90+3'	Stadium: Stadium de Toulouse; Attendance: 30,591; Referee: Stéphane Lannoy

5 May 2007 35	Paris Saint-Germain	1–1	Lyon	Paris
17:10	Cissé 47'	Report	Juninho 90+4'	Stadium: Parc des Princes; Attendance: 41,577; Referee: Olivier Thual

9 May 2007 36	Nice	1–0	Paris Saint-Germain	Nice
20:30	Vahirua 1'	Report		Stadium: Stade du Ray; Attendance: 12,271; Referee: Stéphane Bré

19 May 2007 37	Paris Saint-Germain	2–1	Troyes	Paris
20:45	Pauleta 71' (pen.), 79'	Report	Nivet 23'	Stadium: Parc des Princes; Attendance: 40,816; Referee: Thierry Auriac

26 May 2007 38	Lorient	0–1	Paris Saint-Germain	Lorient
20:45		Report	Pauleta 54'	Stadium: Stade du Moustoir; Attendance: 15,621; Referee: Alexandre Castro

=== Coupe de France ===
7 January 2007 Round of 64	Paris Saint-Germain	3–0	Nîmes Olympique	Paris
15:00	Kalou 9', 58'; Pauleta 22'		Poulain (yellow card) 47'	Stadium: Parc des Princes; Attendance: 12,079; Referee: Stéphane Lannoy

21 January 2007 Round of 32	Paris Saint-Germain	1–0	Gueugnon	Paris
15:15	Chantôme (yellow card) 40'; Kalou 66'		Touré (yellow card) 24'; Bernardet (yellow card) 60'	Stadium: Parc des Princes; Attendance: 15,000; Referee: Saïd Ennjimi

30 January 2007 Round of 16	Paris Saint-Germain	1–0	Valenciennes	Paris
20:45	Rodríguez 55'; Yepes (yellow card) 90'		Bratu (yellow card) 32'; Haddad (yellow card) 44'; Hassli (yellow card) 62'	Stadium: Parc des Princes; Attendance: 15,737; Referee: Philippe Kalt

28 February 2007 Quarter-finals	Sochaux	2–1	Paris Saint-Germain	Montbéliard
21:00	Isabey 25'; Dagano 40'; Afolabi (yellow card) 67'; Tošić (yellow card) 72'		Afolabi 75' (o.g.); Rothen (yellow card) 83'	Stadium: Stade Auguste-Bonal; Attendance: 18,054; Referee: Laurent Duhamel

=== Coupe de la Ligue ===
20 September 2006 Round of 32	Paris Saint-Germain	3–1	Lorient	Paris
21:00	Pauleta 58', 61'; Pancrate 65'; Armand (yellow card) 48'; Rodríguez (yellow card) 90+1'	Report	Barry 27'	Stadium: Parc des Princes; Attendance: 17,525; Referee: Philippe Malige

25 October 2006 Round of 16	Lyon	2–1	Paris Saint-Germain	Lyon
21:00	Squillaci (yellow card) 25'; Vercoutre (yellow card) 57'; Wiltord 88', 90'	Report	Rodríguez (yellow card) 15'; César 58' (pen.); Mulumbu (yellow card) 84'; Chantôme (yellow card) 90'	Stadium: Stade de Gerland; Attendance: 35,816; Referee: Stéphane Bré

=== UEFA Cup ===
==== First round ====
14 September 2006 First leg	Derry City (Republic of Ireland)	0–0	(France) Paris Saint-Germain	Derry, Northern Ireland
20:00		Report		Stadium: Brandywell Stadium; Attendance: 3,400; Referee: Richard Havrilla (Slovakia)

28 September 2006 Second leg	Paris Saint-Germain (France)	2–0 (2–0 agg.)	(Republic of Ireland) Derry City	Paris, France
21:00	Cissé 7'; Pauleta 42'	Report		Stadium: Parc des Princes; Attendance: 25,000; Referee: Oleh Oriekhov (Ukraine)

==== Group stage ====
Pos	Team	Pld	W	D	L	GF	GA	GD	Pts	Qualification	PAN	PSG	HTA	RAP	MLA
1	(Greece) Panathinaikos	4	2	1	1	3	4	−1	7	Advance to knockout stage	—	—	2–0	0–0	—
2	(France) Paris Saint-Germain	4	1	2	1	6	4	+2	5	Advance to knockout stage	4–0	—	2–4	—	—
3	(Israel) Hapoel Tel Aviv	4	1	2	1	7	7	0	5	Advance to knockout stage	—	—	—	2–2	1–1
4	(Romania) Rapid București	4	0	4	0	3	3	0	4		—	0–0	—	—	1–1
5	(Czech Republic) Mladá Boleslav	4	0	3	1	2	3	−1	3		0–1	0–0	—	—	—

19 October 2006 1	Rapid București (Romania)	0–0	(France) Paris Saint-Germain	Bucharest, Romania
20:00		Report		Stadium: Stadionul Giulești-Valentin Stănescu; Attendance: 10,900; Referee: Nikolai Ivanov (Russia)

23 November 2006 2	Paris Saint-Germain (France)	2–4	(Israel) Hapoel Tel Aviv	Paris, France
20:45	Frau 14'; Pauleta 25'	Report	Tuama 2', 6'; Badir 44'; Barda 57'	Stadium: Parc des Princes; Attendance: 30,000; Referee: Michael Weiner (Germany)

30 November 2006 3	Mladá Boleslav (Czech Republic)	0–0	(France) Paris Saint-Germain	Mladá Boleslav, Czech Republic
20:45		Report	Diané (yellow card) (yellow-red card) 45+1'	Stadium: Městský stadion Attendance: 4,840; Referee: Novo Panić (Bosnia and Herzegovina)

13 December 2006 4	Paris Saint-Germain (France)	4–0	(Greece) Panathinaikos	Paris, France
20:45	Pauleta 29', 47'; Kalou 52', 54'	Report		Stadium: Parc des Princes; Attendance: 20,000; Referee: Carlos Megía Dávila (Spain)

==== Knockout phase ====
===== Round of 32 =====
14 February 2007 First leg	AEK Athens (Greece)	0–2	(France) Paris Saint-Germain	Athens, Greece
20:45		Report	Traoré 45+1'; Mendy 88'	Stadium: Olympic Stadium; Attendance: 36,000; Referee: Craig Thomson (Scotland)

22 February 2007 Second leg	Paris Saint-Germain (France)	2–0 (4–0 agg.)	(Greece) AEK Athens	Paris, France
20:45	Frau 42'; Mendy 90+1'	Report		Stadium: Parc des Princes; Attendance: 25,000; Referee: Gianluca Paparesta (Italy)

===== Round of 16 =====
8 March 2007 First leg	Paris Saint-Germain (France)	2–1	(Portugal) Benfica	Paris, France
20:45	Pauleta 36'; Frau 41'	Report	Simão 9'	Stadium: Parc des Princes; Attendance: 43,000; Referee: Graham Poll (England)

15 March 2007 Second leg	Benfica (Portugal)	3–1 (4–3 agg.)	(France) Paris Saint-Germain	Lisbon, Portugal
22:00	Simão 12', 88' (pen.); Petit 27'	Report	Pauleta 32'	Stadium: Estádio da Luz; Attendance: 58,800; Referee: Florian Meyer (Germany)
