= 2004 Trophée des Champions =

- Event: Trophée des Champions
Paris Saint-Germain	Lyon
1	1
- Lyon won 7–6 on penalties
- Date: 31 July 2004
- Venue: Stade Pierre de Coubertin, Cannes, France
- Referee: Gilles Veissière
- Attendance: 9,429

The 2004 Trophée des Champions was a football match held at Stade Pierre de Coubertin, Cannes on 31 July 2004, that saw 2003–04 Ligue 1 champions Olympique Lyonnais defeat 2003–04 Coupe de France winners Paris Saint-Germain 7–6 on penalty kicks after a draw of 1–1.

== Match details ==
31 July 2004
20:45 CET

Paris Saint-Germain	1–1	Lyon
Fiorèse 71'	Report	Élber 54'
Penalties
Pauleta (penalty scored); Rothen (penalty scored); Yepes (penalty scored); Armand (penalty missed); Mendy (penalty scored); Cissé (penalty scored); Benachour (penalty scored); Touré (penalty missed)	6–7	(penalty scored) Bergougnoux; (penalty scored) Viale; (penalty missed) Malouda; (penalty scored) Balmont; (penalty scored) Juninho; (penalty scored) Essien; (penalty scored) Abidal; (penalty scored) Berthod

Stade Pierre de Coubertin, Cannes
Attendance: 9,429
Referee: Gilles Veissière

Paris Saint-Germain	Lyon

PARIS-SAINT-GERMAIN:
GK	16	(France) Jérôme Alonzo
RB	5	(France) Bernard Mendy
CB	3	(Colombia) Mario Yepes
CB	24	(France) José-Karl Pierre-Fanfan (c)
LB	22	(France) Sylvain Armand
RM	11	(France) Fabrice Fiorèse	(substituted off) 88'
CM	14	(France) Édouard Cissé
CM	17	(Cameroon) Jean-Hugues Ateba
LM	25	(France) Jérôme Rothen
FW	8	(Brazil) Reinaldo	(substituted off) 64'
FW	28	(Serbia and Montenegro) Danijel Ljuboja	(substituted off) 79'
Substitutes:
GK	1	(France) Lionel Letizi
DF	2	(France) Stéphane Pichot
MF	18	(Tunisia) Selim Benachour		(substituted on) 88'
FW	7	(France) Alioune Touré		(substituted on) 79'
FW	9	(Portugal) Pauleta		(substituted on) 64'
Manager:
(Bosnia and Herzegovina) Vahid Halilhodžić

OLYMPIQUE LYONNAIS:
GK	1	(France) Grégory Coupet
RB	12	(France) Anthony Réveillère
CB	5	(Brazil) Caçapa (c)
CB	20	(France) Eric Abidal
LB	23	(France) Jérémy Berthod
RM	14	(France) Sidney Govou	(substituted off) 78'
CM	4	(Ghana) Michael Essien
CM	8	(Brazil) Juninho
LM	10	(France) Florent Malouda
FW	9	(Brazil) Giovane Élber	(substituted off) 67'
FW	13	(France) Pierre-Alain Frau	(substituted off) 72'
Substitutes:
GK	30	(France) Nicolas Puydebois
DF	27	(France) Johann Truchet
MF	6	(France) Florent Balmont		(substituted on) 78'
FW	19	(France) Julien Viale		(substituted on) 67'
FW	21	(France) Bryan Bergougnoux		(substituted on) 72'
Manager:
(France) Paul Le Guen

MATCH OFFICIALS

- Assistant referees:
  - Alain Taxil
  - Stéphane Djouzi

== See also ==
- 2004–05 Ligue 1
- 2004–05 Coupe de France
- 2004–05 Olympique Lyonnais season
- 2004–05 Paris Saint-Germain FC season
