= 2006 Trophée des Champions =

- Event: Trophée des Champions
Lyon	Paris Saint-Germain
1	1
- Lyon won 5–4 on penalties
- Date: 30 July 2006
- Venue: Stade de Gerland, Lyon, France
- Referee: Bertrand Layec
- Attendance: 30,529

The 2006 Trophée des Champions was a football match held at Stade Gerland, Lyon on 30 July 2006 that saw 2005–06 Ligue 1 champions Lyon defeat 2005–06 Coupe de France champions Paris Saint-Germain 5–4 on penalties following a 1–1 draw after normal time.

== Match ==
=== Details ===
30 July 2006
17:45 CET

Lyon	1–1	Paris Saint-Germain
Benzema 71' (pen.)	Report	Rothen 62'
Penalties
Carew (penalty scored); Toulalan (penalty scored); Ben Arfa (penalty scored); Benzema (penalty scored); Diarra (penalty scored)	5–4	(penalty scored) Yepes; (penalty scored) Paulo César; (penalty scored) Frau; (penalty scored) Rothen; (penalty missed) Kalou

Stade Gerland, Lyon
Attendance: 30,529
Referee: Bertrand Layec

Lyon	Paris Saint-Germain

GK	30	(France) Rémy Vercoutre
RB	2	(France) François Clerc	(substituted off) 81'
CB	5	(Brazil) Caçapa (c)
CB	29	(France) Sébastien Squillaci
LB	23	(France) Jérémy Berthod	(substituted off) 68'
MF	7	(Mali) Mahamadou Diarra
MF	6	(Sweden) Kim Källström
MF	28	(France) Jérémy Toulalan
MF	18	(France) Hatem Ben Arfa
FW	9	(Norway) John Carew
FW	19	(France) Karim Benzema
Substitutes:
GK	35	(France) Rémy Riou
DF	4	(Switzerland) Patrick Müller	(substituted on) 81'
DF	12	(France) Anthony Réveillère	(substituted on) 68'
DF	24	(France) Romain Beynié
MF	26	(France) Benoît Pedretti
MF	34	(France) Loïc Rémy
FW	39	(France) Grégory Bettiol
Manager:
(France) Gérard Houllier

GK	1	(France) Mickaël Landreau (c)
RB	5	(France) Bernard Mendy (yellow card) 69'
CB	4	(Czech Republic) David Rozehnal
CB	6	(Colombia) Mario Yepes	(yellow card) 73'
CB	17	(Mali) Sammy Traoré	(substituted off) 75'
LB	22	(France) Sylvain Armand	(yellow card) 70'
CM	8	(France) Édouard Cissé
CM	28	(Brazil) Paulo César	(yellow card) 64'
RM	7	(France) Fabrice Pancrate	(substituted off) 63'
LM	25	(France) Jérôme Rothen
FW	13	(France) Pierre-Alain Frau
Substitutes:
GK	16	(France) Jérôme Alonzo
DF	26	(Senegal) Boukary Dramé
MF	24	(France) David Hellebuyck
MF	27	(Cameroon) Albert Baning
MF	33	(France) Clément Chantôme		(substituted on) 75'
FW	14	(France) David Ngog
FW	15	(Ivory Coast) Bonaventure Kalou		(substituted on) 63'
Manager:
(France) Guy Lacombe

MATCH OFFICIALS

- Assistant referees:
  - Patrick Reinbold
  - Franck Leloup
- Fourth official: Jérôme Auroux

== See also ==
- 2006–07 Ligue 1
- 2006–07 Coupe de France
- 2006–07 Olympique Lyonnais season
- 2006–07 Paris Saint-Germain FC season
