= Cristian Rodríguez =

Uruguayan footballer (born 1985)

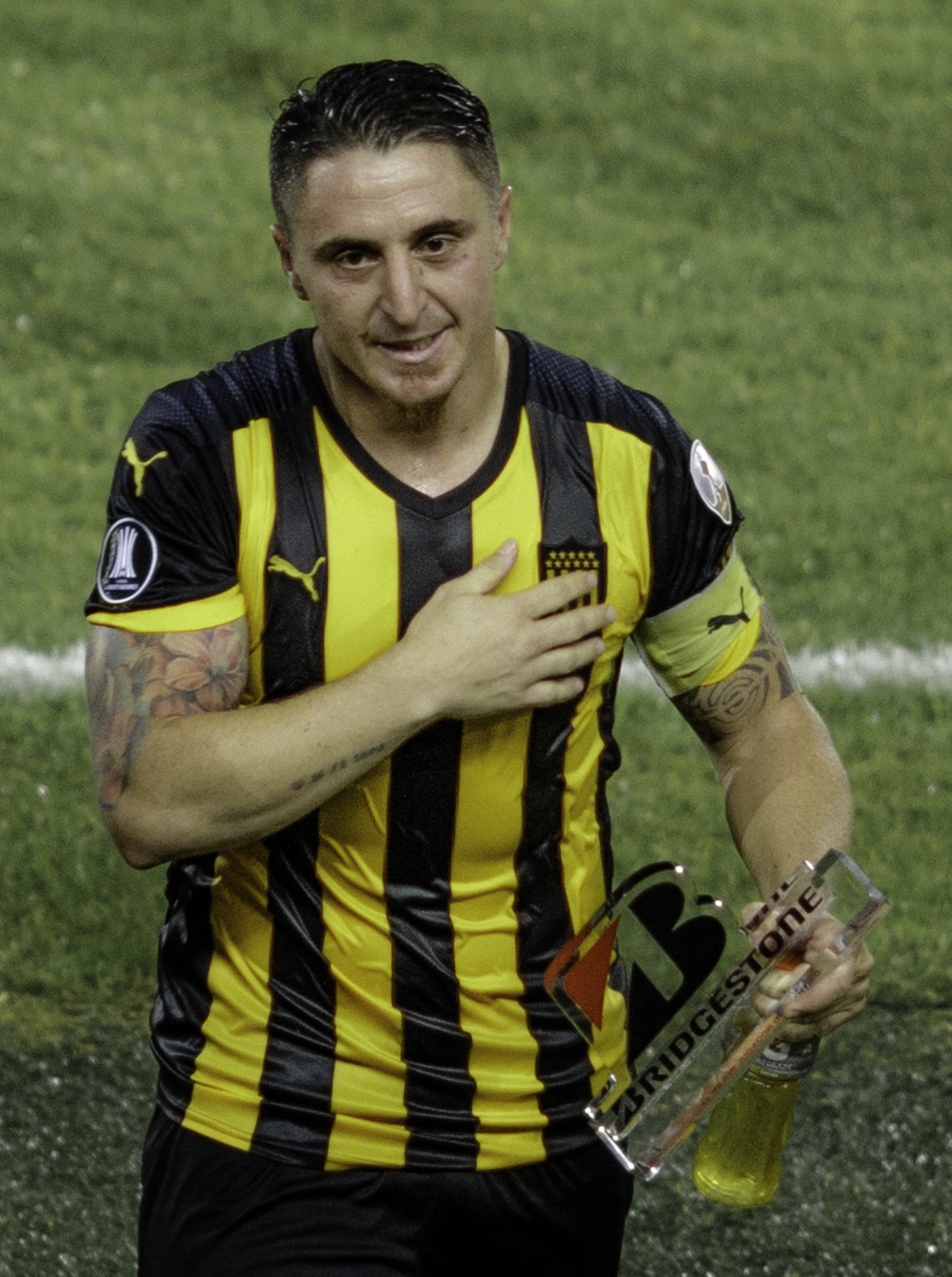
- Rodríguez with Peñarol in 2018

Personal information
- Full name: Cristian Gabriel Rodríguez Barrotti
- Date of birth: 30 September 1985 (age 41)
- Place of birth: Juan Lacaze, Uruguay
- Height: 1.78 m (5 ft 10 in)
- Position: Winger

Youth career
- Peñarol

Senior career*
| Years | Team | Apps | (Gls) |
| 2002–2005 | Peñarol | 55 | (5) |
| 2005–2008 | Paris Saint-Germain | 36 | (1) |
| 2007–2008 | → Benfica (loan) | 24 | (6) |
| 2008–2012 | Porto | 70 | (12) |
| 2012–2015 | Atlético Madrid | 59 | (2) |
| 2015 | → Parma (loan) | 5 | (0) |
| 2015 | → Grêmio (loan) | 0 | (0) |
| 2015–2016 | Independiente | 26 | (3) |
| 2017–2021 | Peñarol | 98 | (31) |
| 2021–2022 | Plaza Colonia | 37 | (4) |
| Total | | 410 | (64) |

International career
| 2003–2005 | Uruguay U20 | 13 | (5) |
| 2003–2018 | Uruguay | 110 | (11) |
- * Club domestic league appearances and goals

Cristian Gabriel Rodríguez Barrotti (Spanish pronunciation: [ˈkɾistjan roˈðɾiɣes]; born 30 September 1985) is a Uruguayan former professional footballer who played as a winger.

Having received the nickname Cebolla (onion) from his Peñarol days, from his father, he was known for his speed and technical ability. He spent several seasons in Portugal with Benfica and Porto, and also played in France, Spain, Italy, Brazil and Argentina.

Rodríguez earned 110 caps for Uruguay, representing the country in two World Cups and four Copa América tournaments and winning the 2011 edition of the latter.

== Club career ==
=== Peñarol and Paris Saint-Germain ===
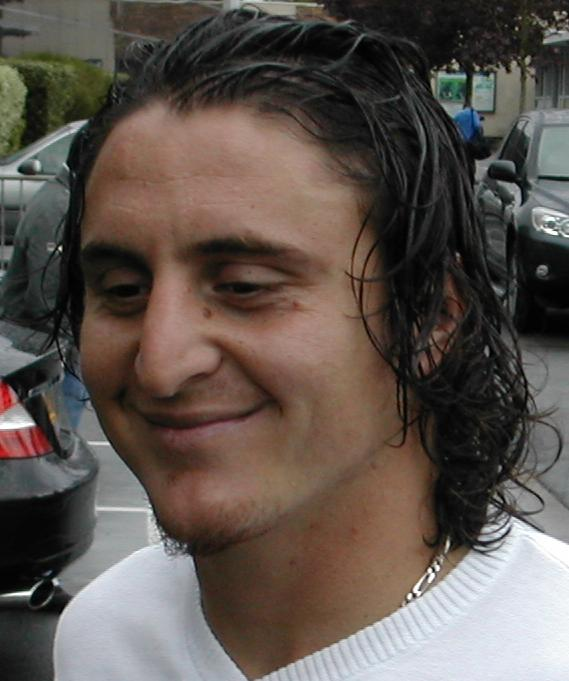
Rodríguez whilst at Paris Saint-Germain

Born in Juan Lacaze, Rodríguez started playing professionally with local Peñarol in the Uruguayan Primera División, helping the side to the 2003 title aged 18. After an injury ruled him out for some games in late 2004, he was spotted by television cameras jumping in the stands alongside the supporters, but he eventually escaped a fine or suspension.

In 2005, Rodríguez was transferred to French club Paris Saint-Germain FC on a free transfer, along with Carlos Bueno. He appeared scarcely in his first season in Ligue 1, but was important in helping the team to barely avoid relegation in the second, scoring his only goal in a 4–2 home win against AS Monaco FC.

=== Porto ===
In late August 2007, Rodríguez moved to Portugal's S.L. Benfica in a season-long loan, together with compatriot Maxi Pereira who arrived from Defensor Sporting. After being one of their most important players throughout 2007–08, he was bought by fellow Primeira Liga club FC Porto in June 2008 (but part of the transfer fee was paid to Play International B.V.). During the two teams' match in Lisbon, on 30 August 2008, he was subjected to vitriolic abuse from the stands in a 1–1 final draw. He eventually settled nonetheless, forming an attacking trio with Argentine Lisandro López and Brazilian Hulk and also scoring occasionally through headers.

Silvestre Varela was bought by Porto in the 2009 off-season, and Rodríguez was relegated to a substitute role. He still made 28 competitive appearances in the 2010–11 campaign (two goals, including one in 11 matches in a victorious run in the UEFA Europa League).

On 17 February 2014, Rodríguez was condemned to pay a €45,000 fine for assaulting two stewards at the Estádio da Luz, following a tunnel brawl during a 1–0 away league loss to Benfica on 20 December 2009.

=== Atlético Madrid ===
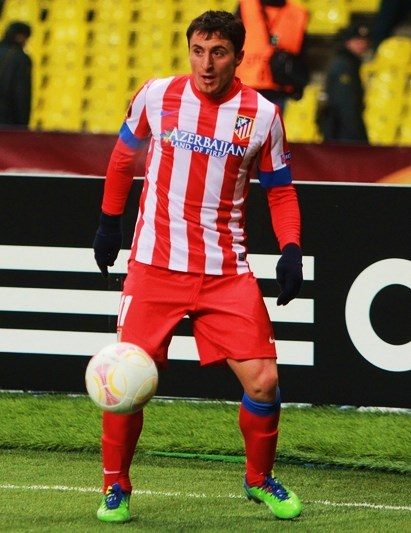
Rodríguez playing for Atlético Madrid in 2013

On 28 May 2012, Rodríguez signed a four-year contract with Atlético Madrid after being released by Porto. He scored his first two goals for his new team in the Europa League group stage, against Hapoel Tel Aviv F.C. (3–0 away victory) and FC Viktoria Plzeň (home); in the latter, he netted the game's only goal through a thunderous left-foot shot in the 93rd minute.

On 20 January 2015, Rodríguez joined Parma F.C. until the end of the season. Less than two months later, however, due to the Italian club's precarious financial situation, he joined Brazil's Grêmio FBPA also on loan.

Rodríguez left Grêmio on 8 May 2015, after struggling with injuries and totalling less than 80 minutes of action.

=== Independiente ===
On 24 July 2015, Rodríguez agreed to a two-year deal at Club Atlético Independiente as a free agent. After suffering from several injury problems, his contract was terminated on 19 December 2016.

=== Return to Uruguay ===
On 3 February 2017, Rodríguez announced his return to Peñarol. He went on to win the 2017 and 2018 national championships as well as the 2018 Supercopa Uruguaya, ending his second stint in April 2021 with 126 appearances and 39 goals in all competitions.

Rodríguez joined Club Plaza Colonia de Deportes on 20 April 2021. On 17 January 2023, he announced his retirement at the age of 37.

== International career ==
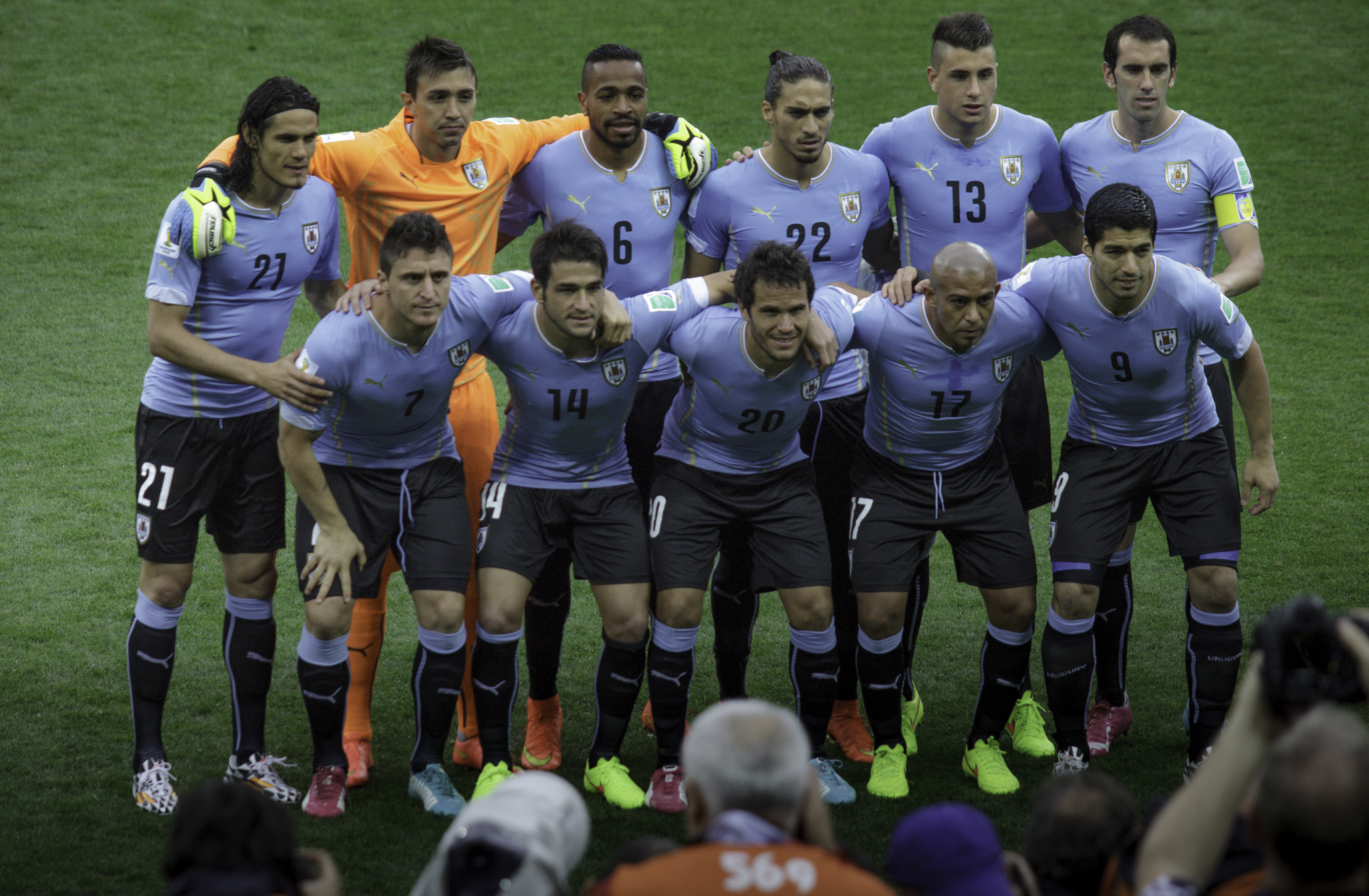
Rodríguez (bottom row, first left) lining up for Uruguay during the 2014 World Cup

Rodríguez made his Uruguay national team debut at age 18 in a friendly against Mexico, and represented the nation in two Copa América tournaments, scoring in the 2007 edition in a 4–1 quarter-final win over Venezuela, the hosts. After assaulting Argentina's Gabriel Heinze during the 2010 FIFA World Cup qualifying stage (0–1 home loss) he received a four-match ban, and coach Oscar Tabárez opted to not select him to the final stages in South Africa.

Picked for the 2011 Copa América in Argentina, Rodríguez featured against Peru (1–1) and Mexico (1–0 victory) in the group stage. Uruguay went on to win the tournament for the 15th time in their history.

Rodríguez was included in the 2015 Copa América squad, scoring the only goal in the tournament opener against Jamaica in Antofagasta. The 32-year-old was also selected to the 2018 World Cup.

== Career statistics ==
=== Club ===
Appearances and goals by club, season and competition
| Club | Season | League | | | National cup | | Continental | | Other | | Total | |
| Club | Season | Division | Apps | Goals | Apps | Goals | Apps | Goals | Apps | Goals | Apps | Goals |
|---|---|---|---|---|---|---|---|---|---|---|---|---|
| Peñarol | 2002 | Uruguayan Primera División | 6 | 0 | — | | — | | — | | 6 | 0 |
| Peñarol | 2003 | Uruguayan Primera División | 21 | 2 | — | | 0 | 0 | — | | 21 | 2 |
| Peñarol | 2004 | Uruguayan Primera División | 28 | 3 | — | | 9 | 1 | — | | 37 | 4 |
| Peñarol | 2005 | Uruguayan Primera División | 0 | 0 | — | | 1 | 0 | 3 | 0 | 4 | 0 |
| Peñarol | Total | | 55 | 5 | — | | 10 | 1 | 3 | 0 | 68 | 6 |
| Paris Saint-Germain | 2005–06 | Ligue 1 | 11 | 0 | 4 | 1 | — | | 0 | 0 | 15 | 1 |
| Paris Saint-Germain | 2006–07 | Ligue 1 | 25 | 1 | 4 | 1 | 6 | 0 | 0 | 0 | 35 | 2 |
| Paris Saint-Germain | 2007–08 | Ligue 1 | 0 | 0 | 0 | 0 | — | | 0 | 0 | 0 | 0 |
| Paris Saint-Germain | Total | | 36 | 1 | 8 | 2 | 6 | 0 | 0 | 0 | 50 | 3 |
| Benfica (loan) | 2007–08 | Primeira Liga | 24 | 6 | 4 | 1 | 8 | 0 | 0 | 0 | 36 | 7 |
| Porto | 2008–09 | Primeira Liga | 29 | 6 | 4 | 0 | 10 | 1 | 2 | 0 | 45 | 7 |
| Porto | 2009–10 | Primeira Liga | 18 | 4 | 4 | 1 | 6 | 0 | 2 | 0 | 30 | 5 |
| Porto | 2010–11 | Primeira Liga | 13 | 1 | 2 | 0 | 11 | 1 | 2 | 0 | 28 | 2 |
| Porto | 2011–12 | Primeira Liga | 10 | 1 | 1 | 0 | 2 | 0 | 4 | 1 | 17 | 2 |
| Porto | Total | | 70 | 12 | 11 | 1 | 29 | 2 | 10 | 1 | 120 | 16 |
| Atlético Madrid | 2012–13 | La Liga | 33 | 1 | 8 | 0 | 6 | 2 | 1 | 0 | 48 | 3 |
| Atlético Madrid | 2013–14 | La Liga | 20 | 1 | 7 | 0 | 10 | 0 | 2 | 0 | 39 | 1 |
| Atlético Madrid | 2014–15 | La Liga | 6 | 0 | 2 | 1 | 2 | 0 | 1 | 0 | 11 | 1 |
| Atlético Madrid | Total | | 59 | 2 | 17 | 1 | 18 | 2 | 4 | 0 | 98 | 5 |
| Parma (loan) | 2014–15 | Serie A | 5 | 0 | 1 | 0 | — | | — | | 6 | 0 |
| Grêmio (loan) | 2015 | Série A | 0 | 0 | 0 | 0 | — | | 2 | 0 | 2 | 0 |
| Independiente | 2015 | Argentine Primera División | 8 | 3 | 0 | 0 | 5 | 0 | — | | 13 | 3 |
| Independiente | 2016 | Argentine Primera División | 10 | 0 | 0 | 0 | 3 | 0 | — | | 13 | 0 |
| Independiente | 2016–17 | Argentine Primera División | 9 | 0 | 0 | 0 | 0 | 0 | — | | 9 | 0 |
| Independiente | Total | | 27 | 3 | 0 | 0 | 8 | 0 | — | | 35 | 3 |
| Peñarol | 2017 | Uruguayan Primera División | 29 | 15 | — | | 6 | 0 | — | | 35 | 15 |
| Peñarol | 2018 | Uruguayan Primera División | 20 | 10 | — | | 8 | 4 | 1 | 1 | 29 | 15 |
| Peñarol | 2019 | Uruguayan Primera División | 23 | 5 | — | | 8 | 1 | 1 | 1 | 32 | 7 |
| Peñarol | 2020 | Uruguayan Primera División | 26 | 1 | — | | 4 | 1 | — | | 30 | 2 |
| Peñarol | Total | | 98 | 31 | — | | 26 | 6 | 2 | 2 | 126 | 39 |
| Plaza Colonia | 2021 | Uruguayan Primera División | 27 | 4 | 0 | 0 | 0 | 0 | 0 | 0 | 27 | 4 |
| Plaza Colonia | 2022 | Uruguayan Primera División | 9 | 0 | 2 | 1 | 1 | 0 | 1 | 0 | 13 | 1 |
| Plaza Colonia | Total | | 36 | 4 | 2 | 1 | 1 | 0 | 1 | 0 | 40 | 5 |
| Career total | | | 410 | 64 | 43 | 6 | 106 | 11 | 22 | 3 | 581 | 84 |

=== International ===
Appearances and goals by national team and year
| National team | Year | Apps | Goals |
|---|---|---|---|
| Uruguay | 2003 | 1 | 0 |
| Uruguay | 2004 | 7 | 1 |
| Uruguay | 2005 | 0 | 0 |
| Uruguay | 2006 | 0 | 0 |
| Uruguay | 2007 | 12 | 1 |
| Uruguay | 2008 | 9 | 1 |
| Uruguay | 2009 | 7 | 0 |
| Uruguay | 2010 | 4 | 1 |
| Uruguay | 2011 | 7 | 0 |
| Uruguay | 2012 | 7 | 1 |
| Uruguay | 2013 | 16 | 3 |
| Uruguay | 2014 | 13 | 0 |
| Uruguay | 2015 | 6 | 1 |
| Uruguay | 2016 | 6 | 2 |
| Uruguay | 2017 | 7 | 0 |
| Uruguay | 2018 | 8 | 0 |
| Total | | 110 | 11 |

Scores and results list Uruguay's goal tally first, score column indicates score after each Rodríguez goal.

List of international goals scored by Cristian Rodríguez
| No. | Date | Venue | Opponent | Score | Result | Competition |
|---|---|---|---|---|---|---|
| 1 | 9 October 2004 | Estadio Monumental, Buenos Aires, Argentina | Argentina | 1–4 | 2–4 | 2006 FIFA World Cup qualification |
| 2 | 7 July 2007 | Polideportivo Pueblo Nuevo, San Cristóbal, Venezuela | Venezuela | 3–1 | 4–1 | 2007 Copa América |
| 3 | 25 May 2008 | RewirpowerSTADION, Bochum, Germany | Turkey | 3–2 | 3–2 | Friendly |
| 4 | 12 October 2010 | Wuhan Sports Center, Wuhan, China | China | 3–0 | 4–0 | Friendly |
| 5 | 10 June 2012 | Estadio Centenario, Montevideo, Uruguay | Peru | 3–2 | 4–2 | 2014 World Cup qualification |
| 6 | 6 February 2013 | Khalifa International Stadium, Doha, Qatar | Spain | 1–1 | 1–3 | Friendly |
| 7 | 15 October 2013 | Estadio Centenario, Montevideo, Uruguay | Argentina | 1–0 | 3–2 | 2014 FIFA World Cup qualification |
| 8 | 13 November 2013 | Amman International Stadium, Amman, Jordan | Jordan | 4–0 | 5–0 | 2014 World Cup qualification |
| 9 | 13 June 2015 | Estadio Regional, Antofagasta, Chile | Jamaica | 1–0 | 1–0 | 2015 Copa América |
| 10 | 6 September 2016 | Estadio Centenario, Montevideo, Uruguay | Paraguay | 2–0 | 2–0 | 2018 FIFA World Cup qualification |
| 11 | 11 October 2016 | Metropolitano Roberto Meléndez, Barranquilla, Colombia | Colombia | 1–1 | 2–2 | 2018 FIFA World Cup qualification |

== Honours ==
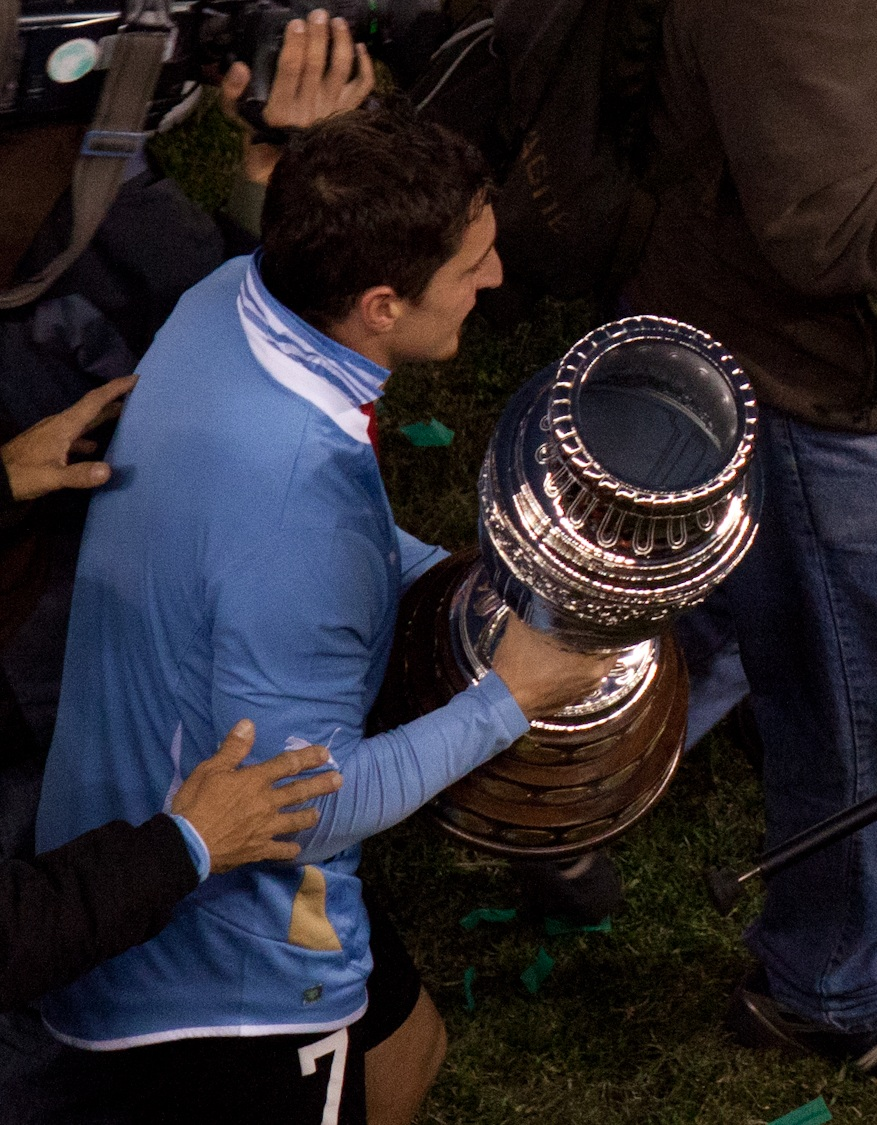
Rodríguez with the 2011 Copa América trophy

Peñarol

- Uruguayan Primera División: 2003, 2017, 2018
- Supercopa Uruguaya: 2018

Paris Saint-Germain

- Coupe de France: 2005–06

Porto

- Primeira Liga: 2008–09, 2010–11, 2011–12
- Taça de Portugal: 2008–09, 2009–10, 2010–11
- Supertaça Cândido de Oliveira: 2010
- UEFA Europa League: 2010–11

Atlético Madrid

- La Liga: 2013–14
- Copa del Rey: 2012–13
- Supercopa de España: 2014
- UEFA Super Cup: 2012

Uruguay

- Copa América: 2011

== See also ==
- List of footballers with 100 or more caps
