= José-Karl Pierre-Fanfan =

French footballer (born 1975)

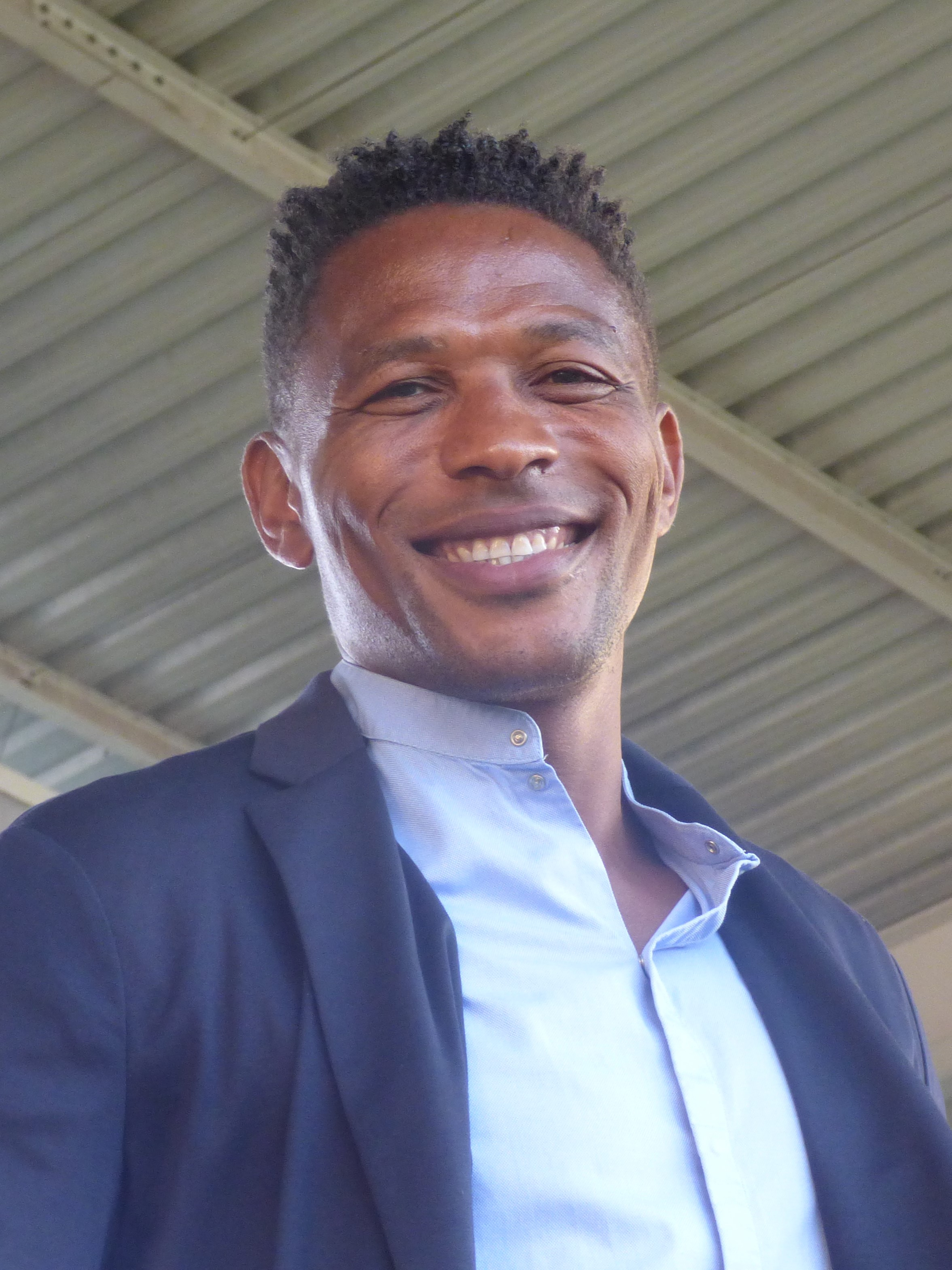
- Pierre-Fanfan in 2023

Personal information
- Full name: José-Karl Pierre-Fanfan
- Date of birth: 26 July 1975 (age 51)
- Place of birth: Saint-Pol-sur-Mer, France
- Height: 1.89 m (6 ft 2 in)
- Position: Centre-back

Senior career*
Years	Team	Apps	(Gls)
1993–1997	Dunkerque	45	(1)
1997–2001	Lens	72	(4)
2001–2003	Monaco	29	(1)
2003–2004	Paris Saint-Germain (loan)	34	(1)
2004–2005	Paris Saint-Germain	33	(1)
2005–2006	Rangers	7	(1)
2007–2009	Al-Siliya		

International career
- Martinique
- * Club domestic league appearances and goals

José-Karl Pierre-Fanfan (born 26 July 1975) is a French former professional footballer who played as a centre-back.

== Career ==
A central defender, Pierre-Fanfan was born in Saint-Pol-sur-Mer and began his career at USL Dunkerque, where he played for four seasons before earning a move to RC Lens. In his first season at Lens he helped them to the French title and played a key role in the clubs run to the UEFA Cup semi-final in 2000.

He joined AS Monaco in 2001, then moved to Paris Saint-Germain in 2004, where he played in the 2004–05 UEFA Champions League campaign.

On 6 July 2005, Fanfan signed for Scottish Premier League club Rangers on a free transfer. After scoring in Rangers' 3–0 defeat of Livingston on his debut, he fell out of favour with Alex McLeish and hardly played a game after September; his final appearance in a Rangers shirt came in November 2005 against Celtic. Incoming Ibrox manager Paul Le Guen deemed him surplus to requirements in July 2006 and he was released on 31 August, hours before the closure of the transfer window.

After being more than a year without a club, he joined Al-Sailiya from Qatar for a spell. In June 2009 Fanfan announced his retirement from football.

Because of his Martiniquais background, Fanfan qualifies to play for their national team.

== Honours ==
RC Lens

- Ligue 1: 1997-98

Paris Saint-Germain

- Coupe de France: 2003–04
