= Pauleta =

Portuguese footballer (born 1973)

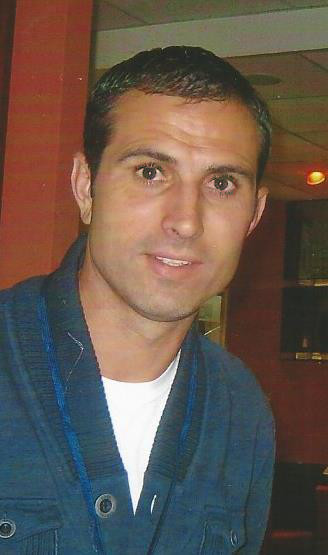
- Pauleta in 2012

Personal information
- Full name: Pedro Miguel Carreiro Resendes
- Date of birth: 28 April 1973 (age 53)
- Place of birth: Ponta Delgada, Azores, Portugal
- Height: 1.80 m (5 ft 11 in)
- Position: Striker

Youth career
- 1987–1989: Santa Clara
- 1989–1990: Porto

Senior career*
Years	Team	Apps	(Gls)
1990–1992	Santa Clara	11	(0)
1992–1994	Operário		
1994	Angrense		
1995	Micaelense	23	(11)
1995–1996	Estoril	29	(18)
1996–1998	Salamanca	71	(34)
1998–2000	Deportivo La Coruña	58	(18)
2000–2003	Bordeaux	98	(65)
2003–2008	Paris Saint-Germain	168	(76)
2010	São Roque	1	(2)
Total		459	(224)

International career
1988	Portugal U16	4	(0)
1996	Portugal U21	1	(0)
1997–2006	Portugal	88	(47)
Medal record
Men's football
Representing Portugal
UEFA European Championship
Runner-up	2004 Portugal
- * Club domestic league appearances and goals

Pedro Miguel Carreiro Resendes ComM OIH (born 28 April 1973), known as Pauleta (Portuguese pronunciation: [pawˈletɐ]), is a Portuguese former professional footballer who played as a striker.

During 18 years as a senior he never played in the Primeira Liga, having spent 12 of those campaigns in Spain and France. He had his most successful spell at Paris Saint-Germain, where he scored 109 goals across all competitions. Three times the top goalscorer in Ligue 1, he was also voted twice as the division's player of the season.

Pauleta also scored 47 goals in 88 matches for Portugal, a national record at the time of his retirement. He played for his country in two World Cups and two European Championships.

== Club career ==
=== Early years and Spain ===
Born in Ponta Delgada, São Miguel Island in the Azores, Pauleta started his career with local clubs in his native region, before turning professional in the lower leagues. He was part of FC Porto's youth team for a brief stint yet left soon due to homesickness, signing his first professional contract with CU Micaelense in 1994 and spending one year there. He then moved to second division's G.D. Estoril Praia in 1995, helping them to the 12th position in his first and only season.

The goals continued to flow following a switch to Spanish second level side UD Salamanca in 1996, with Pauleta scoring 19 goals as it gained promotion to La Liga in the following year, adding a further 15 in his first season in the top flight. That rate earned him a move to Deportivo de La Coruña, in summer 1998.

Pauleta scored his first goal in European competition in the 1999–2000 UEFA Cup, netting in a 3–1 home win against Montpellier HSC and repeating the feat in the second leg (2–0). On 22 November 1999 he netted a hat-trick for Depor in a home fixture against Sevilla FC, going on to enjoy a two-year spell with the Galicians which included 33 goals in 92 official matches, including eight from 12 starts as the club won its first league championship title in 2000.

=== Bordeaux ===
On 1 September 2000, after being tracked by the likes of Newcastle United, Aston Villa and Sunderland, Pauleta joined FC Girondins de Bordeaux in France, reportedly for financial and family reasons. He scored three as his new club crushed FC Nantes 5–0 in an away match, and some days later, on 26 September, did the same in a UEFA Cup first round match against Lierse SK, with his team qualifying for the next round; he enjoyed an impressive run in his first season, ending it as team top scorer with 26 goals in all competitions, and the Ligue 1's second leading scorer with 20.

In the 2001–02 campaign, Pauleta was the league's top scorer with 22 goals. He also led the team charts in all competitions with 35 successful strikes – a record. Subsequently, he was voted the best player in the French League and was also awarded the 'Oscar of football' by fellow players and coaches, and was named one of the 50 players shortlisted for the 2002 European Footballer of the Year award (Ballon d'Or), with only one other player from the French League in the list; additionally, he won the French League Cup, being instrumental to the success by netting twice in the final. After these performances, Manchester City's manager Kevin Keegan expressed an interest in the striker, but Bordeaux's chairman Jean-Louis Triaud said that, initially, they were not interested in the transfer, showing that he could be for sale only in the right circumstances.

In 2002–03, Pauleta proved himself another time, scoring 23 league goals and 30 overall. For the second time he won the title for the best player in the league, and was also named in its team of the year. In total, he registered 65 league goals in 98 games and 91 in 130 matches in all competitions for Bordeaux, ranking third all-time upon his departure.

=== Paris Saint-Germain ===
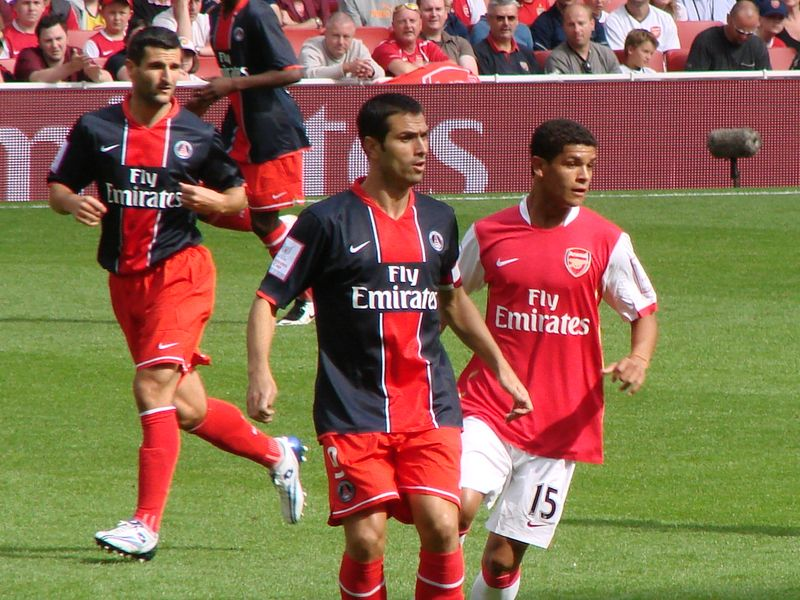
Pauleta in action for PSG at the Emirates Cup in July 2007, finding space around Denílson of Arsenal

Pauleta joined Paris Saint-Germain F.C. ahead of the 2003–04 season, signing a three-year contract in a reported €12 million transfer deal. He helped the capital side to its first silverware in six years by scoring the only goal of the 2004 French Cup final against LB Châteauroux, and continued with his goal scoring exploits in the league, netting 18 times in 37 contests as they finished the league in second place.

On 2 April 2006, Pauleta scored his first hat-trick for Paris Saint-Germain against former club Bordeaux, as the hosts won 3–1. Despite reported interest from defending champions Olympique Lyonnais, he stayed put to help clinch the 2006 French Cup; he netted his 99th and 100th overall goals for the side in heroic fashion, off a fantastic volley and a textbook header respectively.

Pauleta scored one of PSG's goals as they won the 2008 Coupe de la Ligue Final 2–1 against RC Lens. After the 2007–08 campaign, as PSG faced relegation until the very last matchday (eventually reaching safety at 16th), Pauleta retired from football after his last match on 17 May 2008, with the possible exception being if any of the Big three (S.L. Benfica, Sporting CP and Porto) in Portugal came calling, which they did not. He retired at 35 without having played one game in Portugal's Primeira Liga, subsequently staying at PSG but in an ambassadorial role; he remained the club's top scorer of all time with 109 goals in 211 matches, until the record was broken by Zlatan Ibrahimović in October 2015.

In late May 2009, Pauleta played his farewell match at the Parc des Princes, playing one half each with a team of friends and PSG – former and current – players. His son André, 13, replaced him at the end of the game and scored the final two goals.

=== São Roque ===
Pauleta returned to football at the age of 37, joining amateurs Grupo Desportivo São Roque in the Azores' regional leagues and retiring shortly after arriving.

== International career ==
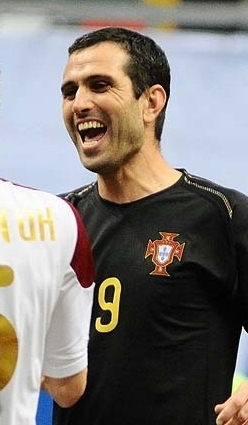
Pauleta with Portugal in 2011

Pauleta was the first Portugal national team player to never have played in the Portuguese top level when he made his international debut against Armenia, in August 1997. He would have to wait 18 months for his first start, against the Netherlands. His first goals came a month later, when he scored two in a 7–0 rout of Azerbaijan in a UEFA Euro 2000 qualifier on 26 March 1999.

A substitute at the Euro 2000 tournament, Pauleta led the Portuguese attack at the 2002 FIFA World Cup, scoring three times against Poland and ending with that tally in as many games, as the nation was ousted in the group stage. On 19 November 2003, he scored four goals in an 8–0 friendly win over Kuwait in Leiria.

Although he played all but one game on the road to the final of Euro 2004, Pauleta did not score in that tournament finals. After the competition, with the international retirements of Fernando Couto, Luís Figo and Rui Costa, he was made captain, a role he held until Figo's return; however, he sporadically played as captain in the latter's absence, including a 2–0 win over Egypt at the Estádio de São Miguel in his hometown on 17 August 2005. On 12 October, against Latvia, he netted twice to become the national team's all-time goal scoring leader at the time, surpassing Eusébio's previous record of 41.

During the 2006 World Cup qualifying campaign, Pauleta was the European zone's top scorer and, in a friendly match against Cape Verde in May 2006 preluding the final stages, he showed great form as he netted a hat-trick in a 4–1 win. However, after scoring the side's first goal in the group stage match against Angola, he failed to find the net again during the tournament; after Portugal's defeat to Germany in the third place play-off, he announced his international retirement.

== Style of play ==
A goalscorer in his prime, Pauleta usually operated as a lone striker or alongside another forward, and combined mobility, pace and athleticism with good technique, two-footedness and strength in the air.

== Personal life ==
Pauleta's nickname was passed down from generation to generation in the family of his father's maternal grandmother, while his goal celebration of spreading his arms like wings earned him the additional moniker The Eagle of the Azores.

In November 2005, he signed to become a FIFA ambassador for the SOS Children's Villages, the first Portuguese to do so.

== Career statistics ==
=== Club ===
Appearances and goals by club, season and competition
Club	Season	League			National cup (Note: Includes Taça de Portugal, Copa del Rey, Coupe de France)		League cup (Note: Includes Coupe de la Ligue)		Europe		Other		Total	
Club	Season	Division	Apps	Goals	Apps	Goals	Apps	Goals	Apps	Goals	Apps	Goals	Apps	Goals
Estoril	1995–96	Segunda Liga	29	18	4	5	–		–		–		33	23
Salamanca	1996–97	Segunda División	37	19	3	0	–		–		–		40	19
Salamanca	1997–98	La Liga	34	15	1	0	–		–		–		35	15
Salamanca	Total		71	34	4	0	–		–		–		75	34
Deportivo	1998–99	La Liga	28	10	9	1	–		–		–		37	11
Deportivo	1999–2000	La Liga	30	8	3	0	–		7 (Note: Appearances in UEFA Cup)	3	–		40	11
Deportivo	2000–01	La Liga	0	0	0	0	–		–		1 (Note: Appearance in Supercopa de España)	0	1	0
Deportivo	Total		58	18	12	1	–		7	3	1	0	78	22
Bordeaux	2000–01	Ligue 1	28	20	1	3	1	0	7	3	–		37	26
Bordeaux	2001–02	Ligue 1	33	22	2	4	4	4	6	5	–		45	35
Bordeaux	2002–03	Ligue 1	37	23	5	5	2	1	4	1	–		48	30
Bordeaux	Total		98	65	8	12	7	5	17	9	–		130	91
Paris Saint-Germain	2003–04	Ligue 1	37	18	5	5	0	0	–		–		42	23
Paris Saint-Germain	2004–05	Ligue 1	35	14	2	4	0	0	6 (Note: Appearances in UEFA Champions League)	1	1 (Note: Appearance in Trophée des Champions)	0	44	19
Paris Saint-Germain	2005–06	Ligue 1	36	21	6	5	2	2	–		–		44	28
Paris Saint-Germain	2006–07	Ligue 1	33	15	3	1	2	2	9	6	0	0	47	24
Paris Saint-Germain	2007–08	Ligue 1	27	8	2	1	5	6	–		–		34	15
Paris Saint-Germain	Total		168	76	18	16	9	10	15	7	1	0	212	109
Career total			424	211	46	34	16	15	39	19	2	0	526	279

=== International ===
National Team	Year	Friendlies		International Competition		Total		Goals per match
National Team	Year	App	Goals	App	Goals	App	Goals	Goals per match
Portugal	1997	0	0	3	0	3	0	0
Portugal	1998	1	0	0	0	1	0	0
Portugal	1999	2	1	5	2	7	3	0.429
Portugal	2000	5	1	4	1	9	2	0.222
Portugal	2001	3	0	7	7	10	7	0.7
Portugal	2002	8	4	3	3	11	7	0.636
Portugal	2003	12	8	0	0	12	8	0.667
Portugal	2004	4	3	10	6	14	9	0.643
Portugal	2005	5	2	7	5	12	7	0.583
Portugal	2006	3	3	6	1	9	4	0.444
Portugal	Total	43	22	45	25	88	47	0.534

== Honours ==
Deportivo

- La Liga: 1999–2000
- Supercopa de España: 2000

Bordeaux

- Coupe de la Ligue: 2001–02

Paris Saint-Germain

- Coupe de France: 2003–04, 2005–06
- Coupe de la Ligue: 2007–08

Portugal

- UEFA European Championship: runner-up 2004

Individual

- Segunda División top scorer: 1996–97
- Ligue 1 top scorer: 2001–02, 2005–06, 2006–07
- UNFP Ligue 1 Footballer of the Year: 2001–02, 2002–03
- UNFP Ligue 1 Team of the Year: 2002–03, 2005–06
- UNFP Ligue 1 Player of the Month: October 2003
- UNFP 20 Year Special Team Trophy: 2011

Orders

- Commander of the Order of Merit
- Officer of the Order of Prince Henry
- Medal of Merit, Order of the Immaculate Conception of Vila Viçosa (House of Braganza)
