= Rudy Haddad =

Footballer (born 1985)

Rudy Haddad רודי חדד
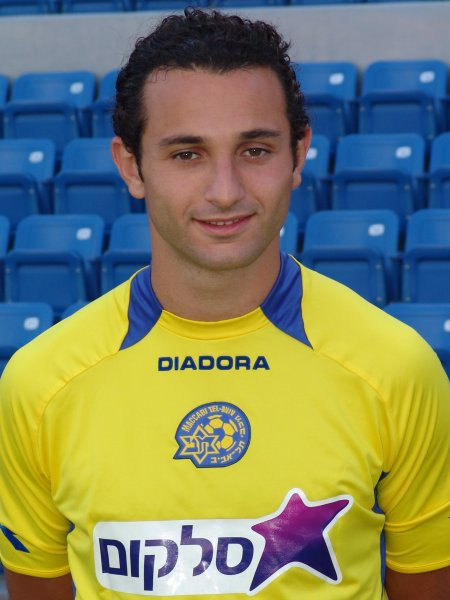
- Haddad with Maccabi Tel Aviv

Personal information
- Date of birth: 5 February 1985 (age 41)
- Place of birth: Paris, France
- Height: 1.80 m (5 ft 11 in)
- Position: Attacking midfielder

Youth career
- Maccabi Paris

Senior career*
Years	Team	Apps	(Gls)
2004–2007	Paris Saint-Germain	9	(0)
2006–2007	→ Valenciennes (loan)	29	(1)
2007–2009	Maccabi Tel Aviv	43	(1)
2009	→ Châteauroux (loan)	18	(0)
2009–2011	Châteauroux	64	(4)
2011–2014	Auxerre	35	(3)
2015–2018	Hapoel Ashkelon	73	(4)
Total		271	(13)

International career
2005–2006	France U21	6	(1)
- * Club domestic league appearances and goals

Rudy Haddad (Hebrew: רודי חדד; born 5 February 1985) is a French former professional footballer who played as an attacking midfielder.

== Career ==
Haddad is Jewish, and was born in Paris and raised in France to a family of Tunisian Jewish descent. He is a previously highly touted young player, having come up through the youth system at Paris Saint-Germain. On 21 January 2009, he was loaned out to Valenciennes FC.

He was unable to hold down a regular first team place at Paris Saint-Germain. He has been noted as a player of some promise but the presence of Portuguese goalscorer Pauleta restricted his first team opportunities. He signed with Maccabi Tel Aviv in July 2007. His Jewish ethnicity made him a prime target for some football clubs in Israel, where he would not count as a foreigner. Maccabi Tel Aviv placed a €500,000 bid for his services.

On 16 June 2011, Haddad signed a three-year contract with Ligue 1 side AJ Auxerre after a three-year stint with LB Châteauroux in Ligue 2.

In August 2015, Hadad signed a two-year contract with Hapoel Ashkelon from Liga Leumit. In the end of the 2015–16 Hadad was one of the key players of Ashkelon's promotion to the Israeli Premier League.

Rudy Haddad holds French and Israeli citizenships.

== See also ==
- List of select Jewish football (association; soccer) players
