= Georges Ba =

Ivorian footballer (born 1979)

Personal information
- Date of birth: 21 January 1979 (age 47)
- Place of birth: Abidjan, Ivory Coast
- Height: 1.86 m (6 ft 1 in)
- Position: Forward

Senior career*
Years	Team	Apps	(Gls)
1997–2001	Tours FC	69	(25)
2001–2002	Entente SSG	26	(6)
2002–2003	Besançon	32	(15)
2003–2005	Nice	21	(3)
2004–2005	→ Montpellier (loan)	6	(0)
2005	→ Le Mans (loan)	13	(7)
2005–2007	Troyes	27	(4)
2007	Maccabi Netanya	8	(2)
2008	Gillingham	4	(0)
2008	Maccabi Netanya	10	(1)
2009–2010	Ajaccio	10	(1)
2010–2011	Vendée Poiré sur Vie	13	(2)
2012	SS Saint-Louisienne	17	(9)
2013	USS Tamponnaise	17	(9)

International career
2003	Ivory Coast	2	(0)
- * Club domestic league appearances and goals

Georges Ba (born 21 January 1979) is an Ivorian former professional footballer who played as a forward.

== Career ==
Ba played for a number of clubs in France and also for Israel's Maccabi Netanya. He traveled to England in early 2008 for a trial with Leeds United, and on 29 March 2008 instead joined another League One side, Gillingham, on a deal which ran until the end of the 2007–08 season. He made his Gillingham debut in a 2–1 home win against Luton Town on 1 April, He was released at the end of the season after four games for the Kent-based club, and rejoined Maccabi Netanya. On 17 December he was released from his contract with Netanya for the second time.

== Post-playing career ==
Ba runs a Professional Soccer Training Business in Irvine, California, as of October 2023.

== Personal life ==
Born in Abidjan, Ba holds both Ivorian and French nationalities.
