= Jean-Michel Badiane =

French footballer (born 1983)

Personal information
- Full name: Jean-Michel Badiane
- Date of birth: 9 May 1983 (age 43)
- Place of birth: Paris, France
- Height: 6 ft 0 in (1.83 m)
- Position: Defender

Youth career
- 1992–1994: AS Neuville-sur-Oise
- 1994–2003: PSG

Senior career*
Years	Team	Apps	(Gls)
2003–2006	PSG	31	(1)
2006–2009	Sedan	47	(3)
2010–2013	Paris FC	52	(2)

International career
2005–2006	France U21	7	(0)
- * Club domestic league appearances and goals

Jean-Michel Badiane (born 9 May 1983) is a French football defender of Senegalese descent, last playing for Ligue 2 side CS Sedan Ardennes.

== Career ==
Jean-Michel Badiane spent three years at the INF Clairefontaine academy, between 1996 and 1999.

A Paris Saint-Germain player until the summer of 2006, Badiane was the third choice centre back for the Parisian side, and made his professional début on 21 August 2004 in a match against Nantes. He signed his first professional contract with the club in 2004, having been with PSG since the age of 10 in the youth teams.

Badiane has represented France at under-15, under-17 and has been in the under-21 squad.

Badiane had trials with English Championship side Stoke City in the summer of 2007, seemingly to replace the outgoing captain Danny Higginbotham.

On 15 April 2009 the defender and CS Sedan Ardennes officials mutually agreed to terminate the player's contract, this season, Badiane has never been able to play due to recurrent knee injuries.
