= Stéphane Pichot =

French footballer (born 1976)

Personal information
- Date of birth: 2 September 1976 (age 50)
- Place of birth: Ernée, France
- Height: 1.79 m (5 ft 10 in)
- Position: Defender

Team information
- Current team: Lille U19 (manager)

Youth career
- Ernéenne Football

Senior career*
Years	Team	Apps	(Gls)
1996–2000	Laval	141	(5)
2000–2004	Lille	115	(0)
2004–2006	Paris Saint-Germain	46	(0)
2006–2009	Sochaux	87	(0)
2009–2011	Strasbourg	59	(0)
2011–2014	Mouscron	103	(1)
Total		551	(6)

Managerial career
- 2014–2015: Mouscron (assistant)
- 2015–2016: Lille (U15)
- 2016–2017: Lille (U16)
- 2017–2019: Lille (U17)
- 2019–2021: Le Mans (assistant)
- 2020: Le Mans (caretaker)
- 2021–: Lille B
- * Club domestic league appearances and goals

Stéphane Pichot (born 2 September 1976) is a French professional football coach and a former defender. He is the head coach of Lille U19.

== Club career ==
Pichot was born in Ernée, France. He played for PSG and on 2 July 2009 RC Strasbourg Alsace signed the former Sochaux right-back on a free transfer where he played until June 2011. While at Sochaux he played as they won the 2007 Coupe de France Final.

== Coaching career ==
Pichot retired at the age of 37 in the summer 2014 and then started his coaching career. He was immediately hired as an assistant coach for his latest club, Mouscron, in the summer 2014. He left the position in July 2015.

In the following years, Pichot worked as a youth coach for his former club Lille OSC. He was in charge of the U15s in the 2015-16 season, the U16s in the 2016-17 season and from July 2017 to June 2019, he was in charge of the U17, which he - in his last season led to the second place in the French U17 championship.

In June 2017 it was confirmed, that Pichot had been hired as an assistant coach at newly promoted Ligue 2 club Le Mans FC under head coach Richard Déziré. After Déziré was fired on 25 February 2020, Pichot was appointed caretaker manager. Pichot was in charge until 29 February 2020, where Réginald Ray was appointed as the new head coach. Pichot then continued in his role as an assistant.
