= Stéphane Lannoy =

French football referee

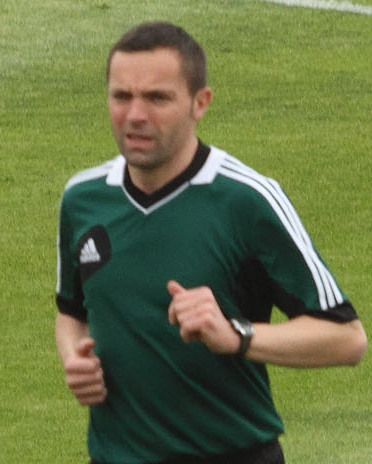
- Lannoy in 2014
- Full name: Stéphane Laurent Lannoy
- Born: 18 September 1969 (age 57); Boulogne-sur-Mer

Stéphane Laurent Lannoy (born 18 September 1969 in Boulogne-sur-Mer) is a French football referee. Lannoy played football at an early age before moving into officiating matches. He has been a FIFA international referee since 2006. He lives in Sailly-sur-la-Lys and works as a video games distributor. He has refereed games at the 2008 Olympics, in the UEFA Champions League, UEFA Cup and qualifiers for the UEFA Euro 2008 and 2010 FIFA World Cup.

He was selected as a referee for the 2010 FIFA World Cup. Lannoy refereed the group stage match between The Netherlands and Denmark and the match between Brazil and Ivory Coast. He was also picked as one referee of the referees for UEFA Euro 2012. On 28 June 2012, Lannoy refereed the Euro 2012 semifinal between Italy and Germany, won 2–1 by Italy. He booked Mario Balotelli, in accordance with UEFA guidelines, for taking his shirt off after a goal celebration.

Since July 31, 2024 he is the head of the Central Refereeing Committee of the Hellenic Football Federation.

== Controversy ==
Stéphane Lannoy came into controversy for his refereeing in the match between Brazil and Ivory Coast of the 2010 FIFA World Cup when he awarded Brazilian player Kaká a second yellow card turned into red card in the 88th minute for a violent contact with Ivoirian player Abdul Kader Keïta. However, camera evidence showed that Abdul Kader Keïta was running into Kaká and dived in the ground, covering his face as if he was injured, after the contact was made.
