= Nicolas Cousin =

French footballer (born 1985)

Personal information
- Date of birth: 11 July 1985 (age 41)
- Place of birth: Nemours, Seine-et-Marne, France
- Height: 1.84 m (6 ft 0 in)
- Position: Goalkeeper

Team information
- Current team: Paris Saint-Germain (youth coach)

Senior career*
Years	Team	Apps	(Gls)
2003–2007	Paris Saint-Germain B		
2007–2009	Angers SCO	1	(0)
2009–2010	US Créteil		
2010	Avion	6	(0)
2011–2019	FC Chartres	190	(0)
- * Club domestic league appearances and goals

Nicolas Cousin (born 11 July 1985) is a retired French professional football player. He previously played for Angers SCO and Paris Saint-Germain at the professional level.

== Coaching career ==
Cousin retired at the end of the 2018-19 season, having played 190 games for FC Chartres. He then returned to Paris Saint-Germain in a goalkeeper coaching role, working with the youth teams at the academy.
