= Paulo César (footballer, born 1978) =

Brazilian footballer and manager

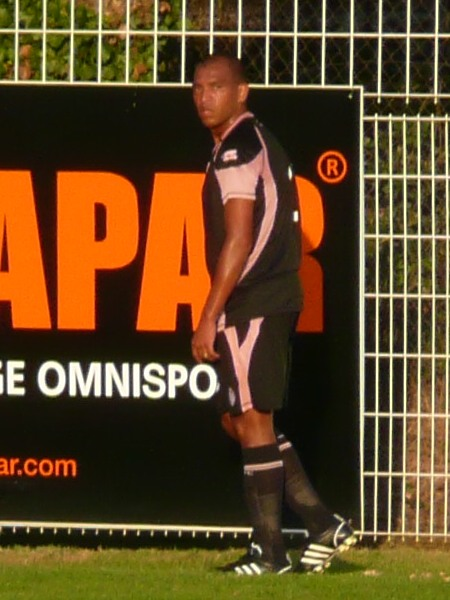

Personal information
- Full name: Paulo César Arruda Parente
- Date of birth: 26 August 1978 (age 48)
- Place of birth: Osasco, SP, Brazil
- Height: 1.76 m (5 ft 9 in)
- Position: Midfielder

Team information
- Current team: Paris Saint-Germain Women (head coach)

Senior career*
Years	Team	Apps	(Gls)
1995	Nacional (SP)		
1996	Flamengo		
1997–2001	Fluminense		
1998	→ Vitória (loan)		
1999	→ Botafogo (loan)		
1999	→ Vasco da Gama (loan)		
2002–2007	Paris Saint-Germain	48	(5)
2004–2005	→ Santos (loan)		
2007–2009	Toulouse	52	(3)
2009	Fluminense		
2010	Barueri		
2011	São Caetano		
2011	Villa Nova		
2012	Audax		
2014	Taboão da Serra		

International career
2002	Brazil	3	(0)

Managerial career
- 2017: Juventude
- 2025–: Paris Saint-Germain (women)
- * Club domestic league appearances and goals

Paulo César Arruda Parente (born 26 August 1978), known as Paulo César, is a Brazilian football manager and former player who is currently the head coach of Paris Saint-Germain Women.

== Playing career ==
César has previously played for Nacional-SP, Flamengo, Fluminense FC, EC Vitória, Botafogo, Vasco da Gama, Santos FC and Paris St-Germain.

On 24 January 2007 he made his Toulouse Ligue 1 debut against Nice and on 26 August 2009 the Brazilian midfielder of Toulouse FC, had announced his transfer to Fluminense FC, the footballer has signed a contract for one season with Tricolor carioca. On 12 January 2010, Fluminense released the midfielder at his request. On 25 February 2010 Grêmio Recreativo Barueri signed the former Fluminense right-back until the end of the season. On 11 January 2011, the ex-national team player set to move to São Caetano from Barueri.

== Coaching career ==
César was appointed manager of Juventude in 2017.

== Personal life ==
Cesár was born in Osasco, São Paulo.

In 2008 he was made an Italian citizen in Potenza Picena, Province of Macerata, in the Italian region of Marche, thanks to his wife's Italian heritage. The interesting fact to this, is that also the footballers Mauro Camoranesi and Cicinho also have immediate family hailing from this village of 15,000 people.

== Honours ==
Paris Saint-Germain

- Coupe de France: 2005–06
