= Fabrice Pancrate =

French footballer (born 1980)

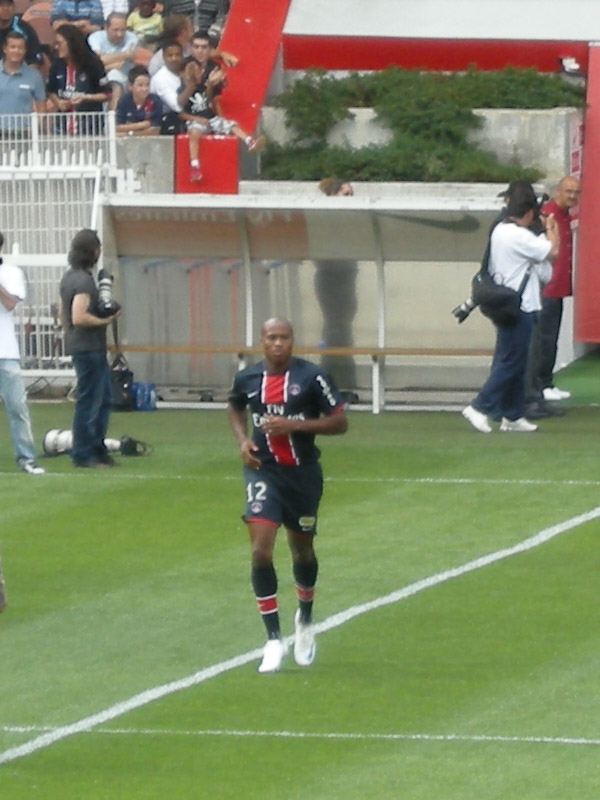
- Pancrate with Paris Saint-Germain in 2007

Personal information
- Full name: Fabrice Dimitri Pancrate
- Date of birth: 2 May 1980 (age 46)
- Place of birth: Paris, France
- Height: 1.85 m (6 ft 1 in)
- Position: Attacking midfielder

Senior career*
Years	Team	Apps	(Gls)
1999–2000	Louhans-Cuiseaux	2	(0)
2000–2002	Guingamp	6	(0)
2002–2004	Le Mans	64	(8)
2004–2009	Paris Saint-Germain	95	(10)
2007	→ Real Betis (loan)	7	(1)
2007–2008	→ Sochaux (loan)	18	(1)
2009–2010	Newcastle United	16	(1)
2011	AEL	8	(1)
2011–2014	Nantes	60	(10)
Total		276	(32)
- * Club domestic league appearances and goals

Fabrice Dimitri Pancrate (French pronunciation: [fabʁis pɑ̃ˈkʁat]; born 2 May 1980) is a French former professional footballer who played as a midfielder.

== Career ==
=== In France ===
Pancrate started his professional career in Louhans-Cuiseaux in 1999, where he played two matches. Then, he joined Guingamp, where he stayed from 2000 until 2002, playing six matches. After his spell at Guingamp, he was transferred to Le Mans, where he scored eight times in 64 appearances.

=== Paris Saint-Germain and loans ===
On 2 August 2004, Pancrate was sold to Paris Saint-Germain for £2,000,000 and played 91 matches, scoring 10 in the domestic league. In 2007, he went on loan from February until May to Real Betis in the Spanish La Liga, playing his first match against Athletic Bilbao on 4 February. Pancrate was again sent on loan for the 2007–08 season, this time to Sochaux. After five years, he was released by Paris Saint-Germain.

=== Newcastle United ===
On 21 November 2009, Pancrate signed a contract with Newcastle until the end of the season with an option to extend. He was given the number 21 shirt. In January 2010, Newcastle signed up fellow right winger Wayne Routledge from Queens Park Rangers on a long-term deal, putting Pancrate's future in doubt, with many Toon fans doubting his ability.

Pancrate made his debut for Newcastle, coming on as a substitute, in a 3–0 win over Swansea City. He scored his first goal on 5 December 2009, after producing an impressive bit of skill, before mullering the ball in off the crossbar, in a 2–0 home victory over Watford, after coming on as a substitute. He has also set up goals for Ryan Taylor in games against Coventry City and Preston North End.

Pancrate was released at the end of the season.

== Honours ==
Paris Saint-Germain

- Coupe de France: 2005–06

Newcastle United

- Football League Championship: 2009–10
