= Jean-Hugues Ateba =

Cameroonian footballer (born 1981)

Personal information
- Full name: Jean-Hugues Ateba Bilayi
- Date of birth: 1 April 1981 (age 45)
- Place of birth: Yaoundé, Cameroon
- Height: 1.72 m (5 ft 8 in)
- Positions: Defender; midfielder

Senior career*
Years	Team	Apps	(Gls)
1997–2004	Nantes	60	(3)
2004–2007	Paris Saint-Germain	30	(0)
2007–2009	Châteauroux	64	(0)
2009–2011	Atromitos	22	(3)
2012–2015	Kingston City	?	(?)
2015	Boulogne-Billancourt	4	(0)

International career
2004–2007	Cameroon	25	(3)
- * Club domestic league appearances and goals

Jean-Hugues Ateba Bilayi (born 1 April 1981) is a Cameroonian former professional footballer who played as a defender.

Born in Yaoundé, Ateba joined Nantes in 1997, coming from Cameroon where he played with Nassara and Brasseries du Cameroun. His debut for the first team came in the 2000–01 season. At the end of the 2003–04 season his contract came to an end, and he chose a transfer to Paris Saint-Germain. After only making 30 appearances in three years for PSG, Bilayi chose to move down to Ligue 2 with Châteauroux.
