= Bernard Mendy =

French footballer (born 1981)

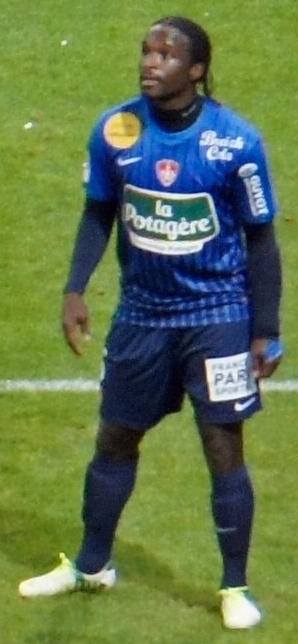
- Mendy playing for Brest in 2012

Personal information
- Date of birth: 20 August 1981 (age 45)
- Place of birth: Évreux, France
- Height: 1.80 m (5 ft 11 in)
- Position: Right-back

Youth career
- 1987–1996: ALM Évreux
- 1996–1998: Caen

Senior career*
Years	Team	Apps	(Gls)
1998–2000	Caen	34	(2)
2000–2008	Paris Saint-Germain	189	(2)
2002–2003	→ Bolton Wanderers (loan)	21	(0)
2008–2010	Hull City	49	(2)
2011–2012	OB	40	(2)
2012–2014	Brest	38	(0)
2014	Chennaiyin	13	(1)
2015	AEL Limassol	12	(0)
2015	Chennaiyin	14	(2)
2016	East Bengal	12	(2)
2016	Chennaiyin	9	(2)
Total		431	(15)

International career
2002–2003	France U21	14	(1)
2004	France	3	(0)

Managerial career
- 2017–2022: Paris Saint-Germain Féminine (assistant)
- 2018: Paris Saint-Germain Féminine (caretaker)
- 2022: Paris Saint-Germain Féminine (caretaker)
Medal record
Men's football
Representing France
UEFA European Under-18 Championship
Winner	2000 Germany
- * Club domestic league appearances and goals

Bernard Mendy (born 20 August 1981) is a French former professional footballer who played as a right-back. He was known for his blistering pace and constant overlapping runs. He most recently served as the assistant manager of Paris Saint-Germain Féminine.

Having started his professional career with Caen in the 1998–99 season, Mendy moved to Paris Saint-Germain in 2000 where his eight-year was only interrupted by a season-long loan at Bolton Wanderers. He went on to play for Hull City and OB before returning to France joining Brest in 2012. Later in his career, he had stints with Indian clubs Chennaiyin FC and East Bengal FC as well as with Cypriot side AEL Limassol.

== Early life ==
Bernard Mendy was born on 20 August 1981 in Évreux, Eure. He is of Senegalese descent through his parents.

== Playing career ==
A fan of Paris Saint-Germain since his childhood, Mendy achieved his ambitions in 2000 when he joined PSG from SM Caen. Even though he had impressed a lot of people with his qualities during his first two seasons at PSG, he was loaned to Bolton Wanderers of England for a year, where he was appreciated for his offensive and speedy style. The new manager of PSG, Vahid Halilhodzic, decided to give him an opportunity to assert himself by using him as a first choice. That year, Mendy played one of his best seasons and was rewarded by playing his first match with the France national team against Brazil. However, he was not selected for the country's 2006 FIFA World Cup roster. In 2008, he came on as a substitute and scored the decisive goal in the final of the Coupe de la Ligue against RC Lens in a 2–1 victory, calmly stroking the ball home from the penalty spot.

Mendy had stated his desire to return to England, to play for his favourite football club, Manchester United. Instead, on 20 June 2008, it was reported by BBC Radio Humberside that Hull City had offered Mendy a three-year deal to join the newly promoted English club. He accepted the offer and joined Hull City for training in Italy. Hull manager Phil Brown had been assistant manager at Bolton during Mendy's time there. He scored his first goal for Hull City, a lob against Manchester United, in a game they lost 4–3. He was released from his contract on 17 May 2010.

On 9 February 2011, Mendy signed a 1 1/2-year contract with Danish club Odense Boldklub having passed the medical examination. On 25 June 2012, Mendy returned to playing in the French league by signing a two-year contract for Stade Brestois on a free transfer.

On 21 August 2014, Mendy was a first round pick in the Inaugural ISL International Draft, signing for the Chennaiyin FC. He started in their first match on 15 October, a 2–1 win at FC Goa.

On 12 January 2016, Mendy signed to play for the I-League side East Bengal in the 2015–16 season.

For the 2016 ISL season, he returned to Chennaiyin for one final season, playing 9 games and scoring twice as Chennaiyin had a disappointing season, finishing 7th in the points table. He decided to end his career at the end of the 2016 ISL season.

== Coaching career ==
Mendy was appointed as assistant manager of Paris Saint-Germain Féminine in December 2017. With manager Patrice Lair joining Chamois Niortais prior to the final of 2017–18 Coupe de France féminine, Mendy took over as caretaker manager and led his side to a 1–0 victory against six-time defending champions Lyon. It was also second major title in team's history after the cup victory in 2010. He continues in his role of assistant manager after the appointment of Olivier Echouafni as manager.

== Personal life ==
Mendy is married to former gymnast Lucy Hughes and has three daughters.

== Career statistics ==
=== Club ===
Appearances and goals by club, season and competition
Club	Season	League			Cup		Continental		Total	
Club	Season	Division	Apps	Goals	Apps	Goals	Apps	Goals	Apps	Goals
Caen	1998–99	Ligue 2	4	0	0	0	—		4	0
Caen	1999–2000	Ligue 2	30	2	1	0	—		31	2
Caen	Total		34	2	1	0	—		35	2
Paris Saint-Germain	2000–01	Ligue 1	19	0	0	0	7 (Note: Appearances in UEFA Champions League)	0	26	0
Paris Saint-Germain	2001–02	Ligue 1	21	1	3	1	3 (Note: Appearances in UEFA Cup/UEFA Europa League)	1	27	3
Paris Saint-Germain	2003–04	Ligue 1	33	0	5	0	—		38	0
Paris Saint-Germain	2004–05	Ligue 1	29	0	3	1	5	0	37	1
Paris Saint-Germain	2005–06	Ligue 1	36	0	4	0	—		40	0
Paris Saint-Germain	2006–07	Ligue 1	28	0	3	0	8	2	39	2
Paris Saint-Germain	2007–08	Ligue 1	23	1	8	3	—		31	4
Paris Saint-Germain	Total		189	2	26	5	23	3	238	10
Bolton Wanderers (loan)	2002–03	Premier League	21	0	0	0	—		21	0
Hull City	2008–09	Premier League	28	2	5	0	—		33	2
Hull City	2009–10	Premier League	21	0	2	0	—		23	0
Hull City	Total		49	2	7	0	—		56	2
OB	2010–11	Danish Superliga	11	0	0	0	—		11	0
OB	2011–12	Danish Superliga	29	2	0	0	6	0	35	2
OB	Total		40	2	0	0	6	0	46	2
Brest	2012–13	Ligue 1	31	0	2	0	—		33	0
Brest	2013–14	Ligue 2	7	0	1	0	—		8	0
Brest	Total		38	0	3	0	—		41	2
Chennaiyin FC	2014	Indian Super League	13	1	—		—		13	1
AEL Limassol	2014–15	Cypriot First Division	12	0	5	0	—		17	0
Chennaiyin FC	2015	Indian Super League	14	2	—		—		14	2
East Bengal	2015–16	I-League	9	2	—		—		9	2
Chennaiyin FC	2016	Indian Super League	12	2	—		—		12	2
Career total			431	15	42	5	29	3	502	23

== Honours ==
Paris Saint-Germain

- Coupe de France: 2003–04, 2005–06
- Coupe de la Ligue: 2007–08
- UEFA Intertoto Cup: 2001

Chennaiyin

- Indian Super League: 2015

France U18

- UEFA European Under-18 Championship: 2000

Individual

- UNFP Team of the Year: 2003–04
