= 1996–97 AS Monaco FC season =

Monaco
1996–97 season
- President: Jean-Louis Campora
- Head coach: Jean Tigana
- Stadium: Stade Louis II
- French Division 1: 1st
- Coupe de France: Round of 64
- Coupe de la Ligue: Semi-finals
- UEFA Cup: Semi-finals
- Top goalscorer: League: Sonny Anderson (19); All: Sonny Anderson (27)

The 1996–97 season was AS Monaco FC's 73rd season in existence and the club's 20th consecutive season in the top flight of French football. In addition to the domestic league, Monaco participated in this season's editions of the Coupe de France and the Coupe de la Ligue. The season covers the period from 1 July 1996 to 30 June 1997.

== Players ==
=== First-team squad ===
Note: Flags indicate national team as defined under FIFA eligibility rules; some limited exceptions apply. Players may hold more than one non-FIFA nationality.

No.	Pos.	Nation	Player
—	GK	FRA	Fabien Barthez
—	GK	FRA	Stéphane Porato
—	DF	FRA	Martin Djetou
—	DF	FRA	Bruno Irles
—	DF	FRA	Philippe Christanval
—	DF	FRA	Franck Dumas
—	DF	BEL	Philippe Léonard
—	DF	CPV	Manuel dos Santos
—	DF	FRA	Éric Di Meco
—	DF	FRA	Patrick Blondeau
—	DF	FRA	Lilian Martin
—	MF	FRA	Emmanuel Petit
—	MF	SEN	Salif Diao

No.	Pos.	Nation	Player
—	MF	FRA	Laurent Viaud
—	MF	FRA	Gilles Grimandi
—	MF	SCO	John Collins
—	MF	FRA	Sylvain Legwinski
—	MF	ALG	Ali Benarbia
—	MF	BEL	Enzo Scifo
—	FW	NGA	Victor Ikpeba
—	FW	FRA	Thierry Henry
—	FW	BRA	Sonny Anderson
—	FW	FRA	David Trezeguet
—	FW	DEN	Dan Petersen
—	FW	SUI	Marco Grassi

== Transfers ==
=== In ===
Date	Player	From	Type	Fee
1 July 1996	(Switzerland) Marco Grassi	Rennes	Transfer	€6,000,000
1 July 1996	(Scotland) John Collins	Celtic	Transfer	Free
1 July 1996	(France) Lilian Martin	Dunkerque	Transfer	Undisclosed
1 July 1996	(Belgium) Philippe Léonard	Standard Liège	Transfer	Undisclosed
2 July 1996	(France) Martin Djetou	Strasbourg	Transfer	Free

==== Out ====
Date	Player	To	Type	Fee
1 July 1996	(France) Lilian Thuram	Parma	Transfer	Free
1 July 1996	(France) Fabien Piveteau	Bastia	Transfer	Undisclosed
1 July 1996	(France) Mickaël Madar	Deportivo La Coruña	Transfer	Undisclosed
1 July 1996	(France) Marc Delaroche	Caen	Transfer	Undisclosed
1 July 1996	(Liberia) Christopher Wreh	Guingamp	Transfer	Undisclosed
1 July 1996	(Senegal) Tony Sylva	Épinal	Loan	Free
1 July 1996	(France) Claude Puel	Retired		

== Competitions ==
=== Overview ===
Competition	First match	Last match	Starting round	Final position	Record							
Competition	First match	Last match	Starting round	Final position	Pld	W	D	L	GF	GA	GD	Win %
French Division 1	10 August 1996	May 1997	Matchday 1	Winners	38	23	10	5	69	30	+39	60.53
Coupe de France	17 January 1997		Round of 64	Round of 64	1	0	0	1	0	1	−1	0.00
Coupe de la Ligue	11 December 1996	18 February 1997	Round of 32	Semi-finals	4	2	1	1	8	6	+2	50.00
UEFA Cup	10 September 1996	22 April 1997	First round	Semi-finals	10	8	0	2	19	7	+12	80.00
Total					53	33	11	9	96	44	+52	62.26

Source: Competitions

=== French Division 1 ===
==== League table ====
Pos	Team	Pld	W	D	L	GF	GA	GD	Pts	Qualification or relegation
1	Monaco (C)	38	23	10	5	69	30	+39	79	Qualification to Champions League group stage
2	Paris Saint-Germain	38	18	13	7	57	31	+26	67	Qualification to Champions League second qualifying round
3	Nantes	38	16	16	6	61	32	+29	64	Qualification to UEFA Cup first round
4	Bordeaux	38	16	15	7	59	42	+17	63	Qualification to UEFA Cup first round
5	Metz	38	17	11	10	40	30	+10	62	Qualification to UEFA Cup first round

Source: Ligue 1
Rules for classification: 1) points; 2) goal difference; 3) number of goals scored.
(C) Champions

==== Results summary ====
Overall								Home						Away					
Pld	W	D	L	GF	GA	GD	Pts	W	D	L	GF	GA	GD	W	D	L	GF	GA	GD
38	23	10	5	69	30	+39	79	12	7	0	37	11	+26	11	3	5	32	19	+13

Source: French Division 1

==== Results by round ====
Round	1	2	3	4	5	6	7	8	9	10	11	12	13	14	15	16	17	18	19	20	21	22	23	24	25	26	27	28	29	30	31	32	33	34	35	36	37	38
Ground	A	H	A	A	H	A	H	A	H	A	H	A	H	A	H	A	H	A	H	A	H	H	A	H	A	H	A	H	A	H	A	H	A	H	A	H	A	H
Result	W	D	L	W	W	D	D	W	D	L	W	D	W	W	W	L	W	W	W	W	D	W	W	W	D	W	L	D	W	W	W	W	L	D	W	D	W	W
Position	1	5	8	5	3	4	6	4	4	7	2	3	2	2	2	2	2	2	2	2	1	1	1	1	1	1	1	1	1	1	1	1	1	1	1	1	1	1

Source: French Division 1
A = Away; H = Home; W = Win; D = Draw; L = Loss

==== Matches ====
10 August 1996 1	Nantes	1–3	Monaco	Nantes
20:00				Stadium: Stade de la Beaujoire; Attendance: 16,777

15 August 1996 2	Monaco	1–1	Montpellier	Monaco
20:30				Stadium: Stade Louis II; Attendance: 10,000

24 August 1996 3	Guingamp	2–1	Monaco	Guingamp
20:00				Stadium: Stade de de Roudourou; Attendance: 11,435

28 August 1996 4	Cannes	0–2	Monaco	Cannes
20:00				Stadium: Stade Pierre de Coubertin; Attendance: 8,985

3 September 1996 5	Monaco	5–1	Lens	Monaco
20:00				Stadium: Stade Louis II; Attendance: 8,215

6 September 1996 6	Paris Saint-Germain	0–0	Monaco	Paris
20:00				Stadium: Parc des Princes; Attendance: 40,529

14 September 1996 7	Monaco	0–0	Lyon	Monaco
20:00				Stadium: Stade Louis II; Attendance: 3,500

20 September 1996 8	Le Havre	1–2	Monaco	Le Havre
20:00				Stadium: Stade Jules Deschaseaux; Attendance: 12,350

28 September 1996 9	Monaco	1–1	Metz	Monaco
20:00				Stadium: Stade Louis II; Attendance: 4,500

2 October 1996 10	Auxerre	2–0	Monaco	Auxerre
20:00				Stadium: Stade de l'Abbé Deschamps; Attendance: 8,000

5 October 1996 11	Monaco	3–1	Rennes	Monaco
20:00				Stadium: Stade Louis II; Attendance: 3,000

12 October 1996 12	Bastia	0–0	Monaco	Furiani
20:00				Stadium: Stade Armand Cesari; Attendance: 7,000

19 October 1996 13	Monaco	4–1	Nice	Monaco
20:00				Stadium: Stade Louis II; Attendance: 6,000

25 October 1996 14	Lille	1–4	Monaco	Lille
20:00				Stadium: Stade Grimonprez-Jooris; Attendance: 13,500

2 November 1996 15	Monaco	3–1	Bordeaux	Monaco
20:00				Stadium: Stade Louis II; Attendance: 7,000

5 November 1996 16	Marseille	3–1	Monaco	Marseille
20:30				Stadium: Stade Vélodrome; Attendance: 19,000

13 November 1996 17	Monaco	2–0	Strasbourg	Monaco
20:00				Stadium: Stade Louis II; Attendance: 2,500

16 November 1996 18	Caen	0–1	Monaco	Caen
20:00				Stadium: Stade Michel d'Ornano; Attendance: 19,968

23 November 1996 19	Monaco	2–0	Nancy	Monaco
20:00				Stadium: Stade Louis II; Attendance: 2,500

28 November 1996 20	Montpellier	0–1	Monaco	Montpellier
20:30				Stadium: Stade de la Mosson; Attendance: 10,511

7 December 1996 21	Monaco	0–0	Guigamp	Monaco
20:00				Stadium: Stade Louis II; Attendance: 3,000

14 December 1996 22	Monaco	1–0	Cannes	Monaco
20:00				Stadium: Stade Louis II; Attendance: 5,000

20 December 1996 23	Lens	1–3	Monaco	Lens
20:00				Stadium: Stade Félix-Bollaert; Attendance: 21,538

26 January 1997 24	Monaco	2–0	Paris Saint-Germain	Monaco
20:45				Stadium: Stade Louis II; Attendance: 16,000

2 February 1997 25	Lyon	3–3	Monaco	Lyon
20:45				Stadium: Stade de Gerland; Attendance: 21,642

14 February 1997 26	Monaco	3–0	Le Havre	Monaco
20:00				Stadium: Stade Louis II; Attendance: 3,000

22 February 1997 27	Metz	2–0	Monaco	Metz
20:00				Stadium: Stade Saint-Symphorien; Attendance: 15,337

9 March 1997 28	Monaco	0–0	Auxerre	Monaco
20:30				Stadium: Stade Louis II; Attendance: 5,000

13 March 1997 29	Rennes	0–3	Monaco	Rennes
20:30				Stadium: Stade de la Route de Lorient; Attendance: 12,479

22 March 1997 30	Monaco	3–1	Bastia	Monaco
20:00				Stadium: Stade Louis II; Attendance: 5,500

26 March 1997 31	Nice	0–2	Monaco	Nice
20:00				Stadium: Stade du Ray; Attendance: 5,783

4 April 1997 32	Monaco	2–0	Lille	Monaco
20:00				Stadium: Stade Louis II; Attendance: 4,000

16 April 1997 33	Bordeaux	2–1	Monaco	Bordeaux
20:00				Stadium: Stade du Parc Lescure; Attendance: 29,000

26 April 1997 34	Monaco	1–1	Marseille	Monaco
20:00				Stadium: Stade Louis II; Attendance: 12,000

29 April 1997 35	Strasbourg	0–2	Monaco	Strasbourg
20:00				Stadium: Stade de la Meinau; Attendance: 25,229

4 May 1997 36	Monaco	2–2	Caen	Monaco
20:30				Stadium: Stade Louis II; Attendance: 6,000

17 May 1997 37	Nancy	1–3	Monaco	Tomblaine
20:00				Stadium: Stade Marcel Picot; Attendance: 11,734

24 May 1997 38	Monaco	2–1	Nantes	Monaco
20:00				Stadium: Stade Louis II; Attendance: 15,000

=== Coupe de France ===
17 January 1997 Round of 64	Stade Lavallois	1–0	Monaco	Laval
20:30				Stadium: Stade Francis Le Basser; Attendance: 13,208

=== Coupe de la Ligue ===
11 December 1996 Round of 32	Monaco	3–3 (a.e.t.) (4–2 p)	Troyes	Monaco
20:00				Stadium: Stade Louis II; Attendance: 1,000

12 January 1997 Round of 16	Le Mans	1–3	Monaco	Le Mans
17:00				Stadium: Stade Léon-Bollée; Attendance: 9,273

29 January 1997 Quarter-finals	Lens	0–1	Monaco	Lens
20:45				Stadium: Stade Bollaert-Delelis; Attendance: 8,000

18 February 1997 Semi-finals	Strasbourg	2–1	Monaco	Strasbourg
20:30				Stadium: Stade de la Meinau; Attendance: 25,787

== Statistics ==
=== Appearances ===
Pos.	Player	Ligue 1	Coupe de France	Coupe de la Ligue	UEFA Cup	Total
GK	(France) Fabien Barthez	36	1	3	10	50
GK	(France) Stéphane Porato	2	0	1	0	3
DF	(France) Bruno Irles	11	0	1	4	16
DF	(France) Patrick Blondeau	31	1	2	10	44
DF	(Cape Verde) Manuel dos Santos	2	0	1	0	3
DF	(Belgium) Philippe Léonard	19	1	1	4	25
DF	(France) Philippe Christanval	0	0	1	0	1
DF	(France) Martin Djetou	26	1	3	10	40
DF	(France) Franck Dumas	36	1	3	8	48
DF	(France) Éric Di Meco	2	0	2	0	4
DF	(France) Lilian Martin	26	1	3	9	39
MF	(Senegal) Salif Diao	0	0	0	0	0
MF	(France) Sylvain Legwinski	37	0	3	9	49
MF	(France) Laurent Viaud	24	1	4	3	32
MF	(Algeria) Ali Benarbia	35	1	3	8	47
MF	(France) Gilles Grimandi	24	0	2	6	32
MF	(France) Emmanuel Petit	29	1	3	7	40
MF	(Scotland) John Collins	28	0	2	9	39
MF	(Belgium) Enzo Scifo	15	1	2	5	23
FW	(Brazil) Sonny Anderson	34	1	3	10	48
FW	(France) Thierry Henry	36	1	2	9	48
FW	(Nigeria) Victor Ikpeba	31	1	3	10	45
FW	(France) David Trezeguet	5	0	0	0	5
FW	(Switzerland) Marco Grassi	12	1	4	3	20
FW	(Denmark) Dan Petersen	10	0	2	0	12

Last updated: 25 August 2023.
