= 2000–01 FC Nantes Atlantique season =

Nantes Atlantique
2000–01 season
- President: Kléber Bobin
- Head coach: Raynald Denoueix
- Division 1: 1st
- Coupe de France: Semi-finals
- Coupe de la Ligue: Semi-finals
- Trophée des Champions: Runners-up
- UEFA Cup: Fourth round
- Top goalscorer: League: Olivier Monterrubio (12); All: Viorel Moldovan (22)
- Average home league attendance: 32,408
- Biggest win: Pacy Vallée-d'Eure Football 0–9 Nantes
- Biggest defeat: Nantes 0–5 Bordeaux

The 2000–01 season was the 58th season in the existence of Nantes Atlantique and the club's 39th consecutive season in the top flight of French football. They participated in the Ligue 1, the Coupe de France and Coupe de la Ligue.

Nantes Atlantique was crowned champions of Division 1 for the eighth time in its history.

== Competitions ==
=== Overview ===
Competition	First match	Last match	Starting round	Final position	Record							
Competition	First match	Last match	Starting round	Final position	Pld	W	D	L	GF	GA	GD	Win %
Division 1	29 July 2000	19 May 2001	Matchday 1	Winners	34	21	5	8	58	36	+22	61.76
Coupe de France	20 January 2001	20 April 2001	Round of 64	Semi-finals	5	4	0	1	18	5	+13	80.00
Coupe de la Ligue	5 January 2001	10 April 2001	Round of 32	Semi-finals	4	2	1	1	8	6	+2	50.00
Trophée des Champions	22 July 2000		Final	Runners-up	1	0	1	0	0	0	+0	0.00
UEFA Cup	14 September 2000	22 February 2001	First round	Fourth round	8	7	0	1	19	9	+10	87.50
Total					52	34	7	11	103	56	+47	65.38

Source: Soccerway

=== Division 1 ===
==== League table ====
Pos	Team	Pld	W	D	L	GF	GA	GD	Pts	Qualification or relegation
1	Nantes (C)	34	21	5	8	58	36	+22	68	Qualification to Champions League first group stage
2	Lyon	34	17	13	4	57	30	+27	64	Qualification to Champions League first group stage
3	Lille	34	16	11	7	43	27	+16	59	Qualification to Champions League third qualifying round
4	Bordeaux	34	15	12	7	48	33	+15	57	Qualification to UEFA Cup first round
5	Sedan	34	14	10	10	47	40	+7	52	Qualification to UEFA Cup first round

Source: Ligue 1
Rules for classification: 1) points; 2) goal difference; 3) number of goals scored.
(C) Champions

==== Results summary ====
Overall								Home						Away					
Pld	W	D	L	GF	GA	GD	Pts	W	D	L	GF	GA	GD	W	D	L	GF	GA	GD
34	21	5	8	58	36	+22	68	12	2	3	27	16	+11	9	3	5	31	20	+11

Source: Ligue 1

==== Results by round ====
Round	1	2	3	4	5	6	7	8	9	10	11	12	13	14	15	16	17	18	19	20	21	22	23	24	25	26	27	28	29	30	31	32	33	34
Ground	H	A	A	H	A	H	A	H	A	H	A	H	A	H	A	H	A	H	H	A	H	A	H	A	H	A	H	A	H	A	H	A	H	A
Result	L	W	W	W	D	L	D	L	L	D	W	W	L	W	L	W	W	W	W	L	W	W	D	L	W	D	W	W	W	W	W	W	W	W
Position	18	7	4	3	4	7	7	10	13	15	11	7	10	6	9	6	5	2	2	4	2	1	1	2	2	2	2	2	2	1	1	1	1	1

Source: Ligue 1
A = Away; H = Home; W = Win; D = Draw; L = Loss

==== Matches ====
29 July 2000 1	Nantes	0–2	Lens	Nantes
20:00 CET (UTC+1)		Report		Stadium: Stade de la Beaujoire

4 August 2000 2	Monaco	2–5	Nantes	Monaco
18:45 CET (UTC+1)		Report		Stadium: Stade Louis II

12 August 2000 3	Guingamp	0–1	Nantes	Guingamp
20:00 CET (UTC+1)		Report		Stadium: Stade de Roudourou

19 August 2000 4	Nantes	3–2	Marseille	Nantes
20:00 CET (UTC+1)		Report		Stadium: Stade de la Beaujoire

26 August 2000 5	Toulouse	1–1	Nantes	Toulouse
20:00 CET (UTC+1)		Report		Stadium: Stadium de Toulouse

6 September 2000 6	Nantes	0–5	Bordeaux	Nantes
20:00 CET (UTC+1)		Report		Stadium: Stade de la Beaujoire

9 September 2000 7	Auxerre	2–2	Nantes	Auxerre
20:00 CET (UTC+1)		Report		Stadium: Stade Abbé-Deschamps

17 September 2000 8	Nantes	0–1	Lyon	Nantes
18:30 CET (UTC+1)		Report		Stadium: Stade de la Beaujoire

23 September 2000 9	Paris Saint-Germain	2–1	Nantes	Paris
20:00 CET (UTC+1)		Report		Stadium: Parc des Princes

1 October 2000 10	Nantes	0–0	Lille	Nantes
18:30 CET (UTC+1)		Report		Stadium: Stade de la Beaujoire

14 October 2000 11	Strasbourg	0–5	Nantes	Strasbourg
17:15 CET (UTC+1)		Report		Stadium: Stade de la Meinau

21 October 2000 12	Nantes	1–0	Rennes	Nantes
20:00 CET (UTC+1)		Report		Stadium: Stade de la Beaujoire

29 October 2000 13	Sedan	2–0	Nantes	Sedan
19:00 CET (UTC+1)		Report		Stadium: Stade Louis Dugauguez

4 November 2000 14	Nantes	2–0	Metz	Nantes
20:00 CET (UTC+1)		Report		Stadium: Stade de la Beaujoire

18 November 2000 16	Nantes	4–0	Troyes	Nantes
20:00 CET (UTC+1)		Report		Stadium: Stade de la Beaujoire

26 November 2000 17	Saint-Étienne	0–2	Nantes	Saint-Étienne
17:00 CET (UTC+1)		Report		Stadium: Stade Geoffroy-Guichard

29 November 2000 18	Nantes	3–1	Monaco	Nantes
20:00 CET (UTC+1)		Report		Stadium: Stade de la Beaujoire

2 December 2000 19	Nantes	2–1	Guingamp	Nantes
20:00 CET (UTC+1)		Report		Stadium: Stade de la Beaujoire

10 December 2000 20	Marseille	2–0	Nantes	Marseille
17:00 CET (UTC+1)		Report		Stadium: Stade Vélodrome

13 December 2000 15	Bastia	3–1	Nantes	Furiani
20:00 CET (UTC+1)		Report		Stadium: Stade Armand-Cesari

17 December 2000 21	Nantes	3–2	Toulouse	Nantes
18:30 CET (UTC+1)		Report		Stadium: Stade de la Beaujoire

21 December 2000 22	Bordeaux	0–2	Nantes	Bordeaux
18:00 CET (UTC+1)		Report		Stadium: Stade Chaban-Delmas

13 January 2001 23	Nantes	1–1	Auxerre	Nantes
17:15 CET (UTC+1)		Report		Stadium: Stade de la Beaujoire

27 January 2001 24	Lyon	3–1	Nantes	Lyon
17:15 CET (UTC+1)		Report		Stadium: Stade de Gerland

3 February 2001 25	Nantes	1–0	Paris Saint-Germain	Nantes
17:15 CET (UTC+1)		Report		Stadium: Stade de la Beaujoire

7 February 2001 26	Lille	1–1	Nantes	Lille
20:00 CET (UTC+1)		Report		Stadium: Stade Grimonprez-Jooris

18 February 2001 27	Nantes	1–0	Strasbourg	Nantes
18:30 CET (UTC+1)		Report		Stadium: Stade de la Beaujoire

4 March 2001 28	Rennes	0–2	Nantes	Rennes
20:45 CET (UTC+1)		Report		Stadium: Roazhon Park

17 March 2001 29	Nantes	4–1	Sedan	Nantes
20:00 CET (UTC+1)		Report		Stadium: Stade de la Beaujoire

7 April 2001 30	Metz	1–2	Nantes	Metz
20:00 CET (UTC+1)		Report		Stadium: Stade Saint-Symphorien

14 April 2001 31	Nantes	1–0	Bastia	Nantes
17:15 CET (UTC+1)	Monterrubio 27'	Report		Stadium: Stade de la Beaujoire; Attendance: 35,096; Referee: Alain Sars

29 April 2001 32	Troyes	0–1	Nantes	Troyes
18:00 CET (UTC+1)		Report	Da Rocha 59'	Stadium: Stade de l'Aube; Attendance: 16,856; Referee: Bruno Derrien

12 May 2001 33	Nantes	1–0	Saint-Étienne	Nantes
20:00 CET (UTC+1)	Vahirua 9'	Report		Stadium: Stade de la Beaujoire; Attendance: 35,852; Referee: Stéphane Bré

19 May 2001 34	Lens	1–4	Nantes	Lens
20:00 CET (UTC+1)				Stadium: Stade Bollaert-Delelis; Attendance: 40,651; Referee: Damien Ledentu

=== Coupe de France ===
20 January 2001 Round of 64	Pacy Vallée-d'Eure Football	0–9	Nantes	Mantes-la-Ville
20:00 CET (UTC+1)				Stadium: Stade Aimé Bergeal; Attendance: 6,000

10 February 2001 Round of 32	Bordeaux	0–1	Nantes	Bordeaux
17:00 CET (UTC+1)				Stadium: Stade Chaban-Delmas; Attendance: 12,000; Referee: Stéphane Bré

10 March 2001 Round of 16	FA Carcassonne-Villalbe	0–3	Nantes	Carcassonne
20:00 CET (UTC+1)				Stadium: Stade Albert Domec; Attendance: 10,000

31 March 2001 Quarter-finals	Nantes	4–1 (a.e.t.)	Auxerre	Nantes
17:00 CET (UTC+1)				Stadium: Stade de la Beaujoire; Attendance: 25,567; Referee: Pascal Garibian

20 April 2001 Semi-finals	Strasbourg	4–1	Nantes	Strasbourg
20:45 CET (UTC+1)		Report		Stadium: Stade de la Meinau; Attendance: 16,469; Referee: Claude Colombo

=== Coupe de la Ligue ===
5 January 2001 Round of 32	Rennes	2–4 (a.e.t.)	Nantes	Rennes
18:00 CET (UTC+1)				Stadium: Roazhon Park

30 January 2001 Round of 16	ASOA Valence	1–1 (a.e.t.) (2–4 p)	Nantes	Valence
16:15 CET (UTC+1)				Stadium: Stade Georges Pompidou; Referee: Hervé Piccirillo

13 March 2001 Quarter-finals	Troyes	0–1	Nantes	Troyes
18:00 CET (UTC+1)				Stadium: Stade de l'Aube

10 April 2001 Semi-finals	Lyon	3–2	Nantes	Lyon
20:45 CET (UTC+1)				Stadium: Stade de Gerland

=== Trophée des Champions ===
22 July 2000 Final	Monaco	0–0 (6–5 p)	Nantes	Lyon
17:00 CEST (UTC+2)		Report		Stadium: Montbéliard; Attendance: 9,918; Referee: Stéphane Moulin
	Penalties
	Riise (penalty scored); Christanval (penalty missed); Gallardo (penalty missed); Contreras (penalty missed); Eloi (penalty scored); Irles (penalty scored); Djetou (penalty scored); Costinha (penalty scored); Farnerud (penalty scored)		(penalty scored) Leroy; (penalty missed) Carrière; (penalty scored) Fabbri; (penalty missed) Savinaud; (penalty missed) Da Rocha; (penalty scored) Laspalles; (penalty scored) Piocelle; (penalty scored) Vahirua; (penalty missed) Armand

=== UEFA Cup ===
==== First round ====
14 September 2000 First leg	Kryvbas Kryvyi Rih (Ukraine)	0–1	(France) Nantes	Kryvyi Rih, Ukraine
20:00 CET (UTC+1)		Report	Ziani 81'	Stadium: Metalurh Stadium; Attendance: 16,000; Referee: Roy Helge Olsen (Norway)

28 September 2000 Second leg	Nantes (France)	5–0 (6–0 agg.)	(Ukraine) Kryvbas Kryvyi Rih	Nantes, France
20:00 CET (UTC+1)	Moldovan 8', 33', 54'; Da Rocha 34'; Gillet 64'	Report		Stadium: Stade de la Beaujoire; Attendance: 16,334; Referee: Sorin Corpodean (Romania)

==== Second round ====
26 October 2000 First leg	Nantes (France)	2–1	(Hungary) MTK Budapest	Nantes, France
18:45 CET (UTC+1)	Ziani 64'; Gillet 74'	Report	Ferenczi 28'	Stadium: Stade de la Beaujoire; Attendance: 13,925; Referee: Wolfgang Stark (Germany)

9 November 2000 Second leg	MTK Budapest (Hungary)	0–1 (1–3 agg.)	(France) Nantes	Budapest, Hungary
18:00 CET (UTC+1)		Report	Monterrubio 88'	Stadium: Hidegkuti Nándor Stadium; Attendance: 1,537; Referee: Mikko Vuorela (Finland)

==== Third round ====
23 November 2000 First leg	Nantes (France)	4–3	(Switzerland) Lausanne-Sport	Nantes, France
19:15 CET (UTC+1)	Moldovan 18'; Monterrubio 43'; Puce 73'; Gillet 86'	Report	Kuźba 41' (pen.), 70'; Mazzoni 53'	Stadium: Stade de la Beaujoire; Attendance: 18,000; Referee: Atanas Uzunov (Bulgaria)

7 December 2000 Second leg	Lausanne-Sport (Switzerland)	1–3 (4–7 agg.)	(France) Nantes	Lausanne, Switzerland
20:15 CET (UTC+1)	Lombardo 49'	Report	Ziani 24'; Moldovan 59'; Carrière 88'	Stadium: Stade Olympique de la Pontaise; Attendance: 14,200; Referee: Roelof Luinge (Netherlands)

==== Fourth round ====
15 February 2001 First leg	Porto (Portugal)	3–1	(France) Nantes	Porto, Portugal
22:30 CET (UTC+1)	Esquerdinha 16' (pen.); Gillet 59' (o.g.); Secretário 85'	Report	Ahamada 14'	Stadium: Estádio das Antas; Attendance: 22,100; Referee: Konrad Plautz (Austria)

22 February 2001 Second leg	Nantes (France)	2–1 (3–4 agg.)	(Portugal) Porto	Nantes, France
20:45 CET (UTC+1)	Vahirua 69'; Armand 74'	Report	Pena 35'	Stadium: Stade de la Beaujoire; Attendance: 29,000; Referee: Juan Fernández Marín (Spain)

== Statistics ==
=== Goalscorers ===
Rank	No.	Pos	Nat	Name	Division 1	Coupe de France	Coupe de la Ligue	Trophée des Champions	UEFA Cup	Total
1	9	FW	(Romania)	Viorel Moldovan	11	4	2	0	5	22
2	18	MF	(France)	Olivier Monterrubio	12	1	0	0	2	15
2	19	FW	(France)	Marama Vahirua	7	5	2	0	1	15
4	9	MF	(France)	Stéphane Ziani	4	1	1	0	3	9
Totals					58	18	8	0	19	103
