= 2000 Trophée des Champions =

- Event: Trophée des Champions
Monaco	Nantes
0	0
- Monaco won 6–5 on penalties
- Date: 22 July 2000
- Venue: Stade Auguste Bonal, Montbéliard, France
- Referee: Stéphane Moulin
- Attendance: 9,918

The 2000 Trophée des Champions was a football match held at Stade Auguste Bonal, Montbéliard on 22 July 2000, that saw 1999–2000 Division 1 champions AS Monaco FC defeat 1999–2000 Coupe de France winners FC Nantes 6-5 on penalty kicks after a draw of 0–0.

== Match details ==
22 July 2000
17:00 CET

Monaco	0–0	Nantes
	Report
Penalties
Riise (penalty scored); Christanval (penalty missed); Gallardo (penalty missed); Contreras (penalty missed); Eloi (penalty scored); Irles (penalty scored); Djetou (penalty scored); Costinha (penalty scored); Farnerud (penalty scored)	6–5	(penalty scored) Leroy; (penalty missed) Carrière; (penalty scored) Fabbri; (penalty missed) Savinaud; (penalty missed) Da Rocha; (penalty scored) Laspalles; (penalty scored) Piocelle; (penalty scored) Vahirua; (penalty missed) Armand

Stade Auguste Bonal, Montbéliard
Attendance: 9,918
Referee: Stéphane Moulin

MONACO:
GK	1	(France) Stéphane Porato
RB	23	(France) Bruno Irles
CB	2	(Chile) Pablo Contreras
CB	5	(France) Philippe Christanval
LB	17	(Belgium) Philippe Léonard	(substituted off) 45'
RM	8	(France) Ludovic Giuly	(substituted off) 72'
CM	6	(France) Martin Djetou (c)
CM	7	(Portugal) Costinha
LM	10	(Argentina) Marcelo Gallardo
FW	11	(Italy) Marco Simone
FW	20	(Croatia) Dado Pršo	(substituted off) 85'
Substitutes:
GK	16	(France) André Biancarelli
DF	3	(Norway) John Arne Riise		(substituted on) 72'
MF	21	(Sweden) Pontus Farnerud		(substituted on) 45'
FW	9	(France) Xavier Gravelaine
FW	14	(Haiti) Wagneau Eloi		(substituted on) 85'
Manager:
(France) Claude Puel

NANTES:
GK	1	(France) Mickaël Landreau (c)
RB	3	(France) Nicolas Laspalles
CB	2	(Argentina) Néstor Fabbri
CB	4	(Portugal) Mário Silva
LB	6	(Cameroon) Salomon Olembé	(substituted off) 60'
MF	10	(France) Eric Carrière
MF	12	(France) Sébastien Piocelle
MF	13	(France) Mathieu Berson	(substituted off) 86'
MF	15	(France) Nicolas Savinaud
FW	8	(France) Frédéric Da Rocha
FW	18	(France) Olivier Monterrubio	(substituted off) 86'
Substitutes:
GK	16	(France) Willy Grondin
DF	22	(France) Sylvain Armand		(substituted on) 86'
MF	14	(France) Mehdi Leroy		(substituted on) 60'
FW	7	(France) Alioune Touré
FW	19	(France) Marama Vahirua		(substituted on) 86'
Manager:
(France) Raynald Denoueix

MATCH OFFICIALS

- Assistant referees:
  - Richard Delorme
  - Attilio Ugolini
- Fourth official: Gilles Cheron

== See also ==
- 2000–01 French Division 1
- 2000–01 Coupe de France
- 2000–01 FC Nantes season
