= David Trezeguet =

French footballer (born 1977)

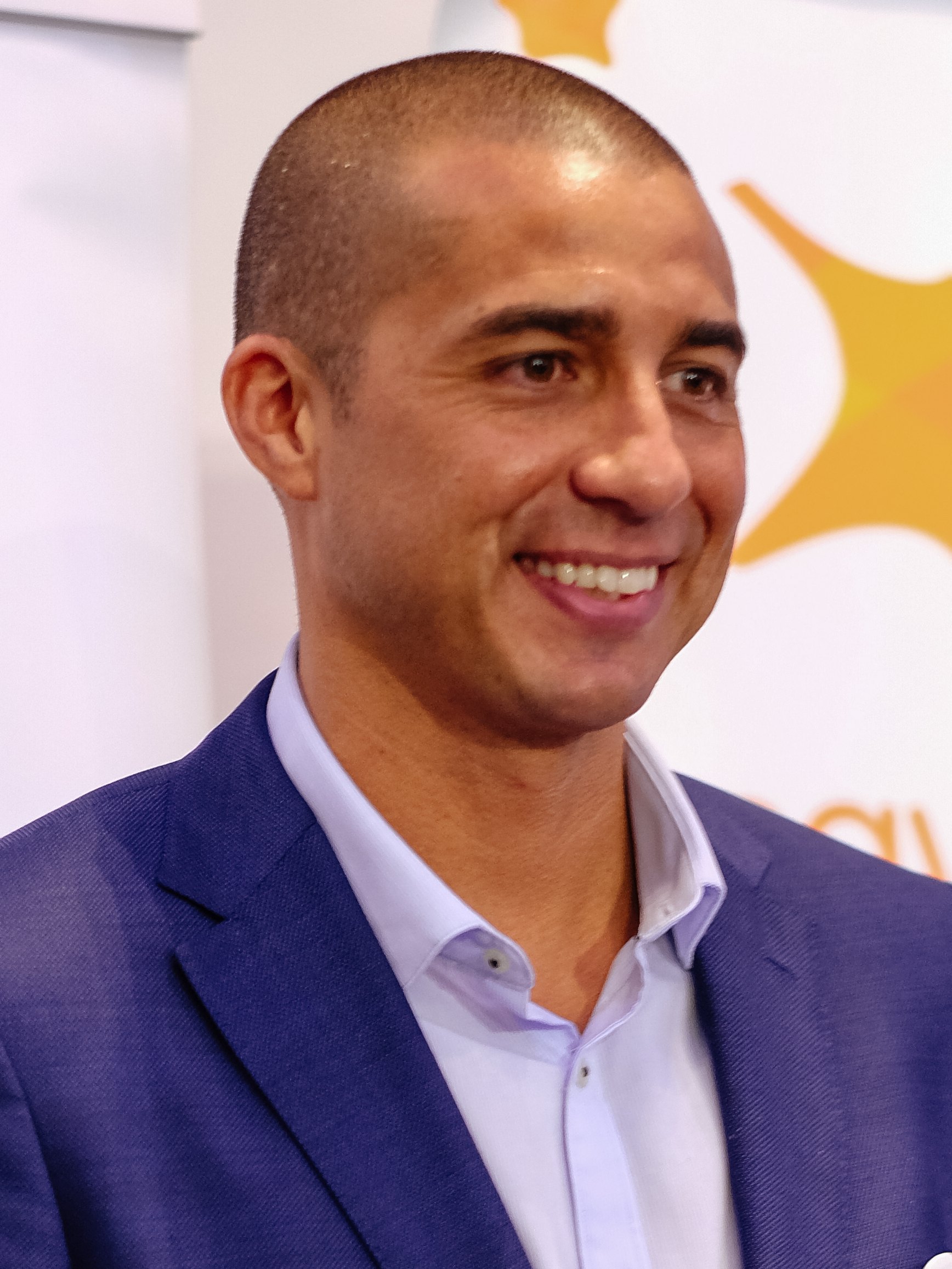
- Trezeguet in 2017

Personal information
- Full name: David Sergio Trezeguet
- Date of birth: 15 October 1977 (age 49)
- Place of birth: Rouen, Seine-Maritime, France
- Height: 1.90 m (6 ft 3 in)
- Position: Striker

Youth career
- 1984–1993: Platense

Senior career*
Years	Team	Apps	(Gls)
1994–1995	Platense	5	(0)
1995–2000	Monaco	93	(52)
2000–2010	Juventus	245	(138)
2010–2011	Hércules	31	(12)
2011	Baniyas	3	(0)
2012–2013	River Plate	35	(16)
2013–2014	Newell's Old Boys	24	(7)
2014	Pune City	9	(2)
Total		445	(227)

International career
1995–1996	France U18	12	(15)
1996–1997	France U20	14	(12)
1997–1998	France U21	6	(10)
1998–2008	France	71	(34)
Medal record
Men's football
Representing France
FIFA World Cup
Winner	1998
Runner-up	2006
UEFA European Championship
Winner	2000
- * Club domestic league appearances and goals

David Sergio Trezeguet (French: [david sɛʁʒjo tʁezəɡɛ], Spanish: [daˈβið ˈseɾxjo tɾeseˈɣe(t)]; born 15 October 1977) is a French former professional footballer who played as a striker. Trezeguet played in teams like Monaco, Juventus and River Plate, he also was part of the France national team who won the 1998 FIFA World Cup and the UEFA Euro 2000, scoring the golden goal in the final.

Trezeguet began his career in Argentina with Club Atlético Platense at the age of eight, progressing through their youth system to their first team, where he made his debut in the Primera División in 1994. After one season, he transferred to Division 1 side Monaco, where he would form a striking partnership with international teammate Thierry Henry, winning the league in the 1996–97 season. He left the club in 2000, having scored 52 goals in 93 Division 1 appearances and having claimed two Division 1 championships and the 1997 Trophée des champions.

In 2000, Trezeguet signed for Serie A club Juventus for a transfer fee of £20 million. With 24 goals, he was the joint recipient of the Capocannoniere award for top scorer as his team won the 2001–02 Serie A title; Trezeguet also scored eight goals in 10 Champions League appearances as Juventus reached the second round of the tournament. Despite struggling with injuries the following season, he won another league title with the club, and also scored four goals in 10 Champions League appearances as Juventus reached the final of the tournament, eventually losing 2–3 on penalties to Milan, as Trezeguet missed his spot kick in the resulting shoot-out. Overall, Trezeguet scored 138 goals in 245 league appearances for Juventus, making him the fourth-highest goalscorer in the club's history. Later in his career he had brief spells in Spain, the United Arab Emirates, Argentina and India.

Born in France where his Argentine father was playing football, Trezeguet grew up in Argentina. At international level, Trezeguet chose to represent the France national team. He scored 34 goals in 71 appearances for France between 1998 and 2008. He also played for France at under–18, under–20, and under–21 levels. Trezeguet represented France at the 1997 FIFA World Youth Championship, the 1998 FIFA World Cup, UEFA Euro 2000, the 2002 World Cup, Euro 2004 and the 2006 World Cup (where he missed his penalty in the shoot-out against Italy in the final). Trezeguet is part of the FIFA 100 list of 125 Greatest living players. In 2015, he was named one of the Golden Foot Award Legends.

== Early life ==
David Sergio Trezeguet was born on 15 October 1977 in Rouen, Seine-Maritime, France, but grew up in Buenos Aires, Argentina. His father Jorge Trezeguet was playing football for FC Rouen. He left the club in 1979 and returned to Argentina with his family. In 1999, David Trezeguet married Beatriz, who is from Alicante, Spain. They have two sons together, Aarón (born 2000) and Noraan (born 2008). They divorced in 2012.

== Club career ==
=== Platense ===
Trezeguet began his career at Platense in the Argentine Primera División, where he played his first professional game on 12 June 1994 as a 16-year-old in a 1–1 tie against Gimnasia. After just five matches with the team, he moved to play for AS Monaco.

=== Monaco ===
In 1995, he was close to joining Paris Saint-Germain, but the deal was cancelled after the two clubs failed to agree a deal. Shortly afterwards, he opted to join Monaco. Monaco coach Jean Tigana was "impressed" by Trezeguet, who scored five goals in trial, signing a deal which saw him earn 15,000 francs a month. Trezeguet spent two seasons with Monaco B, having made just nine appearances in total for the club's first team during his first two seasons. In 1998, Trezeguet scored the fastest ever goal in terms of velocity in UEFA Champions League history in a quarter-final match against Manchester United. The shot that resulted in a goal was clocked at 97.6 mph (157.3 km/h). With Monaco, he won Ligue 1 twice and was named Ligue 1 Young Player of the Year in 1998. He scored a total of 60 goals in 113 appearances for the Monégasque club and it was here that he made his name as a potent goalscoring poacher.

=== Juventus ===
During his first season with Juventus, under manager Carlo Ancelotti, Trezeguet managed 14 goals in Serie A, despite being predominantly utilised as a substitute striker, behind Filippo Inzaghi, who started alongside Alessandro Del Piero. Juventus missed out on the 2000–01 Serie A title that season, finishing in second place behind Roma. In his second season at the club, under manager Marcello Lippi, he scored 24 league goals in 34 league matches to finish as the Serie A top goalscorer, along with Dario Hübner of Piacenza, as Juventus won the 2001–02 Serie A title. That same season, he was named Serie A Footballer of the Year and Serie A Foreign Footballer of the Year, also reaching the final of the 2001–02 Coppa Italia; he also scored eight goals in ten UEFA Champions League appearances, although the club were eliminated in the second round of the competition. In January 2002, a car carrying Trezeguet and teammates Mark Iuliano, Gianluca Zambrotta and Enzo Maresca after a 3–1 win over Hellas Verona, collided with two others; none of the four players were injured in the accident.

In his third season, his appearances were limited by injuries, although he still helped Juventus to defend the Serie A title, also winning the 2002 Supercoppa Italiana and scoring four goals in ten appearances as Juventus reached the 2003 UEFA Champions League Final. In the final, Trezeguet was one of three Juventus players to have their penalty saved by Milan keeper Dida, as Juventus lost 3–2 on penalty kicks after a 0–0 draw. This would be the closest Trezeguet ever got to winning the Champions League. During the 2003–04 season, Trezeguet helped the team to win a second consecutive Supercoppa Italiana title, scoring a goal during the match, also reaching another Coppa Italia final, although their European and domestic league campaigns would be less successful, despite his 16 goals in Serie A that season, as the club finished the league in third place. In 2004, Brazilian legend Pelé included Trezeguet in the FIFA 100, his list of the 125 greatest living footballers.

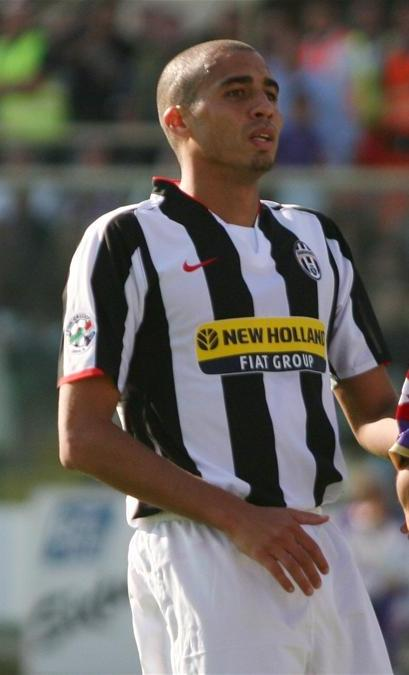
Trezeguet playing for Juventus in 2007.

Although Trezeguet won the 2004–05 Serie A and 2005–06 Serie A titles with Juventus, scoring 23 league goals in the 2005–06 season, Juventus were caught in the 2006 Italian football scandal that rocked Italian football, and along with Milan, Fiorentina, Lazio, and Reggina were accused of match fixing. While the players had no part in the scandal, Juventus were subsequently stripped of their 2004–05 and 2005–06 titles, relegated to Serie B, and were to start the 2006–07 season with a deficit of 30 points, eventually reduced to nine points on appeal. Following the enforced relegation to Serie B, the club lost several of its star players, including Fabio Cannavaro to Real Madrid, Gianluca Zambrotta to Barcelona, Adrian Mutu to Fiorentina, and Zlatan Ibrahimović to Internazionale. Trezeguet's compatriots Lilian Thuram and Patrick Vieira also left Juventus, for Barcelona and Inter, respectively. Manager Fabio Capello defected to Real Madrid and former Juventus legend and Trezeguet's former France teammate and captain, Didier Deschamps, was appointed the new manager of Juve. As one of the club's star players, Trezeguet was heavily linked to a move away from Juventus, but he ultimately stayed with the Bianconeri to help the club return to Italy's top flight.

On 16 September 2006, before Juventus' Serie B match against Vicenza, he was awarded a commemorative plate in recognition of his 125 career goals. On 19 May 2007, Juventus achieved promotion to Serie A after a 5–1 win over Arezzo. Trezeguet scored the fifth goal which made the promotion mathematically possible. Despite the successful return to Serie A, and an eventual Serie B title, the season was not without controversy. After scoring a goal in Juventus' final match of the 2006–07 Serie B season against Spezia, Trezeguet made a gesture toward the club president, making a number 15 with his fingers – the number of goals he scored throughout the Serie B season – which was followed by a hand gesture which, in Italian, means "I'm out of here". Juventus, however, announced on 25 June 2007 that Trezeguet had renewed his contract until 2011.

During the 2007–08 Serie A season, Trezeguet scored 20 league goals and was second only to teammate and club captain Alessandro Del Piero for the Capocannoniere. Juventus finished third in the league to qualify for the Champions League after missing out on the tournament for two consecutive seasons. In the 2008–09 season, Trezeguet sustained a groin injury that kept him out for most of the season. Trezeguet finally made his return on 4 February 2009 against Napoli in the Coppa Italia and had a goal controversially disallowed. Nevertheless, he was one of the players who scored in the penalty shootout, which Juventus won 4–3. Trezeguet would shortly get his first goal of 2009 in a 2–0 win against Palermo in late February – a match where he received the captaincy for the first time in his professional career. Juventus finished the season in second place in the league, also reaching the semi-finals of the Coppa Italia and the round of 16 of the UEFA Champions League. On 9 December 2009, Trezeguet scored his 168th goal for Juventus in a 4–1 defeat to Bayern Munich in the 2009–10 UEFA Champions League, making him the club's highest-ever foreign goalscorer, surpassing Omar Sívori's total of 167 goals. At the end of the 2009–10 season, Trezeguet ranked fourth among Juventus' all-time top goalscorers with 171 goals. In August 2010, he was released from the remaining 12 months of his contract by Juventus.

=== Hércules ===
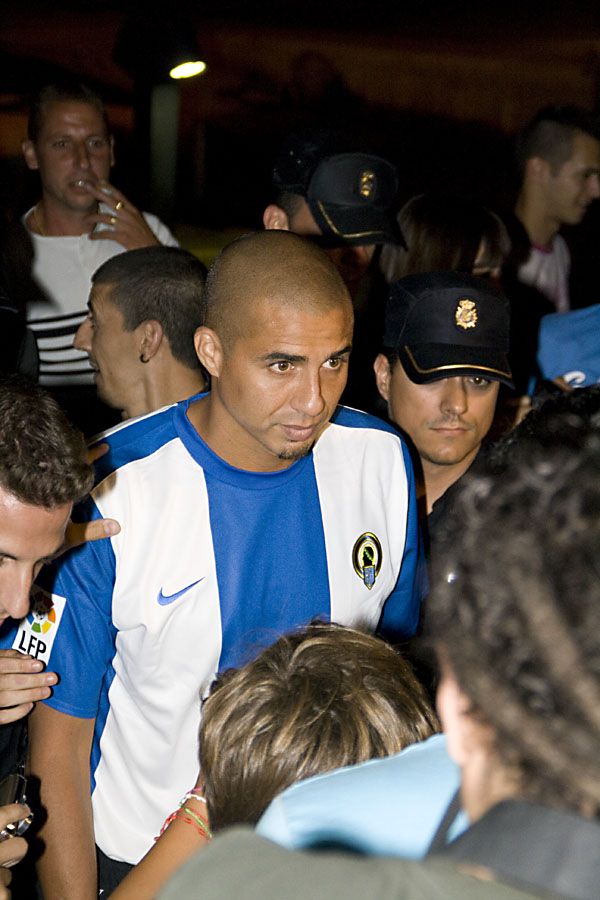
Trezeguet during his presentation as a player of Hércules in August 2010.

On 28 August 2010, Trezeguet completed his move to newly promoted La Liga team Hércules on a two-year deal; the club is based in his then wife's hometown. He made his debut on 11 September in a 2–0 surprise victory against defending champions Barcelona. Eight days later, Trezeguet scored his first goal for the club, a conversion from the penalty spot in a 2–1 loss against Valencia. He was unable to prevent relegation for the side, however, and left the club at the start of the summer of 2011. Trezeguet made 31 league appearances and scored 12 goals, making him the club's top goalscorer for the season.

=== Baniyas ===
On 30 August 2011, Trezeguet completed his move to UAE Pro-League side Baniyas on a one-year deal. On 21 November 2011, his contract was mutually terminated due to an injury which had kept him sidelined for most of the season. Trezeguet only appeared in the opening league match and a fixture in the Etisalat Emirates Cup for Baniyas.

=== River Plate ===
On 19 December 2011, Trezeguet moved to River Plate in Argentina on a three-year contract, shortly after the club was relegated to the Argentine second division for the first time in its history. Trezeguet, a childhood fan of River, having grown up in Buenos Aires, spoke of it as his dream move, saying, "Being here is a unique feeling, motivated by everything that River represents." On 19 January 2012, Trezeguet scored in his first appearance for River Plate in a friendly match against Racing Club. He made his official debut on 13 February 2012. He played his first match at Estadio Monumental the following week and scored his first official goal for River Plate after coming on as a substitute. On 26 February, he scored his second official goal, again after coming on as a substitute in the second half.

Trezeguet scored his first double in River Plate on 10 March against Defensa y Justicia, the first goal giving River Plate a 2–1 lead, while the second one tying the match 3–3. In the next match, he played for the first time in the starting XI and scored in the first half to maintain his excellent scoring form for River Plate. Trezeguet would later state that the adrenaline he gets while playing for River surpasses any other moment he experienced in his career, including winning the 1998 FIFA World Cup with France and scoring the golden goal in the finals of UEFA Euro 2000: "I am feeling things that I have never felt before. Not with Juventus, nor with Monaco and not even at international level with France. Being a River fan and seeing the passion that exists in this team, all the people and all the pressure, I have more adrenaline than ever before." In the final match of the championship against Almirante Brown on 23 June, Trezeguet secured victory by scoring both of River's goals to seal promotion back to the top flight; Trezeguet also missed a penalty during the match. Trezeguet finished his first season at River Plate with 13 goals in 18 matches, finishing sixth behind the team's top goalscorer, Fernando Cavenaghi. On 9 September 2012, he scored his first goal in the Primera División Argentina against Newell's Old Boys in a 3–3 draw. He would later score against Estudiantes de La Plata in a 1–0 win and also against Colón in a 2–1 victory. Despite being a key member of the River Plate squad which returned to the Primera División Argentina, it was decided in June by head coach and manager Ramón Díaz that he would no longer be a part of the team's squad, despite fan protests.

=== Newell's Old Boys ===
On 22 July 2013, Trezeguet joined Newell's Old Boys on a one-year deal. He made his debut on 18 August coming on as a substitute for Víctor Aquino in the 73rd minute, his side drew 0–0 with Belgrano. In his second game for the NOB he scored his first goal in the 90th minute against Atletico Rafaela, they won the game 2–0. On 1 November, Trezeguet scored his 300th career goal against Colón and 11 minutes later followed up with his 301st career goal and subsequently the equaliser, drawing 2–2 on the night.

=== Pune City ===
On 30 July 2014, Trezeguet signed for Indian Super League club Pune City. Trezeguet scored his first goal for the club against Goa, by the virtue of which, his franchise registered their first victory in the tournament. This was followed by his second and his last goal in ISL, which came in a defeat against Kerala Blasters. On 20 January 2015, it was announced that Trezeguet had retired as a player and was set to join the Juventus management team. It was confirmed by Trezeguet's agent.

== International career ==
As a French–Argentine, Trezeguet was eligible to play for France or Argentina. Trezeguet first competed internationally in the French youth squad alongside Thierry Henry, Willy Sagnol, and William Gallas, and played in the 1997 FIFA World Youth Championship. In the lead up to the 1998 World Cup in France, Aimé Jacquet gave younger players such as David Trezeguet, Henry and Patrick Vieira the chance to display their talent, and all three were eventually selected for the World Cup ahead of experienced French players including David Ginola. Trezeguet scored one goal in the tournament, in the 4–0 win over Saudi Arabia, as France went on to win the World Cup, defeating Brazil 3–0 in the final at the Stade de France. Two years later France were crowned European champions after defeating Italy 2–1 in the Euro 2000 final, courtesy of Trezeguet's golden goal in extra time from a Robert Pires assist.

Although ranked first in the world, France was not very successful in the 2002 World Cup, being eliminated in the group stage without scoring a single goal, despite David Trezeguet, Thierry Henry and Djibril Cissé being the top goalscorers respectively in Serie A, the Premier League and Ligue 1 that season. The failure was then followed up by a quarter-final exit at Euro 2004 at the hands of unheralded Greece with Trezeguet scoring just one goal in the tournament in a 2–2 draw against Croatia. However, with the return of Zinedine Zidane from brief international retirement, France would go on to reach the final of the 2006 World Cup. Throughout the tournament, Trezeguet found himself out of place in Raymond Domenech's 4–2–3–1 formation which only used one striker – a position allocated to Thierry Henry. On 9 July 2006, Trezeguet took part in the final, coming on as a substitute. The match, against Italy, went to a penalty shootout and Trezeguet was the only player from either team to miss his penalty, his shot hitting the crossbar, as Italy won 5–3 on penalty kicks after a 1–1 draw.

On 19 October 2007, Trezeguet threatened to quit France after being overlooked for two Euro 2008 qualifying matches by coach Raymond Domenech. On 26 March 2008, Trezeguet was selected for a friendly against England to replace the injured Karim Benzema, which would turn out to be his last appearance for France as he was subsequently not chosen for the squad that competed in Euro 2008. On 9 July 2008, he announced his retirement from international football, finishing his France career ranked third among France's all-time top goalscorers with 34 goals from 71 caps. He cited "the awful Euro 2008 and the reappointment of the coach" being the main reasons for this decision, and also added "I see football differently from how they see it in France. Euro 2008 was very negative, but what annoys me more is that Domenech is staying."

== Style of play ==
Trezeguet was a prolific, complete, and talented striker, who was gifted with pace, power, instinct, and an eye for goal. A highly opportunistic player, he was excellent at taking advantage of chances and loose balls in the area, and was an accurate striker of the ball, known for his clinical finishing, as well as his ability to score with few touches, due to his ability to shoot first time and finish off chances from close range, even when off-balance or from awkward positions. He was capable of scoring with either foot, despite being naturally right footed, as well as with his head, and excelled in the air; he was also known for having a penchant for scoring acrobatic goals. Although he wasn't particularly known for his link-up play, he was highly regarded for his positional sense, anticipation, reactions, offensive movement, and his ability to lose his markers, as well as for his skill at playing with his back to goal, courtesy of his solid technique. Considered to be one of the best strikers of his generation, due to the number of goals he scored for Juventus he gained the nicknames: Cobra, Trezegol, and Re David (King David, in Italian), during his time at the club. Despite his ability, his playing time throughout his career was often limited by injuries.

== Career statistics ==
=== Club ===
Appearances and goals by club, season and competition
Club	Season	League			National cup (Note: Includes Coupe de France, Coppa Italia, Copa Argentina)		Continental		Other		Total	
Club	Season	Division	Apps	Goals	Apps	Goals	Apps	Goals	Apps	Goals	Apps	Goals
Platense	1993–94	Primera División	3	0	—		—		—		3	0
Platense	1994–95	Primera División	2	0	—		—		—		2	0
Platense	Total		5	0	—		—		—		5	0
Monaco	1995–96	Division 1	4	0	0	0	—		1 (Note: Appearance(s) in Coupe de la Ligue)	0	5	0
Monaco	1996–97	Division 1	5	0	0	0	—		—		5	0
Monaco	1997–98	Division 1	27	18	3	1	9 (Note: Appearances in UEFA Champions League)	4	2	1	41	24
Monaco	1998–99	Division 1	27	12	1	0	5 (Note: Appearances in UEFA Cup)	2	2	0	35	14
Monaco	1999–2000	Division 1	30	22	1	0	6	2	1	0	38	24
Monaco	Total		93	52	5	1	21	8	6	1	125	62
Juventus	2000–01	Serie A	25	14	2	0	5	1	—		32	15
Juventus	2001–02	Serie A	34	24	2	0	10	8	—		46	32
Juventus	2002–03	Serie A	17	9	1	0	10	4	0	0	28	13
Juventus	2003–04	Serie A	25	16	3	1	5	4	1 (Note: Appearance in Supercoppa Italiana)	1	34	22
Juventus	2004–05	Serie A	18	9	1	1	5	4	—		24	14
Juventus	2005–06	Serie A	32	23	0	0	9	6	1	0	42	29
Juventus	2006–07	Serie B	31	15	1	0	—		—		32	15
Juventus	2007–08	Serie A	36	20	3	0	—		—		39	20
Juventus	2008–09	Serie A	8	1	1	0	4	0	—		12	1
Juventus	2009–10	Serie A	19	7	0	0	8 (Note: Four appearances and one goal in UEFA Champions League, three appearances and two goals in UEFA Europa League)	3	—		27	10
Juventus	2010–11	Serie A	0	0	0	0	1 (Note: Appearance in UEFA Europa League)	0	—		1	0
Juventus	Total		245	138	16	2	57	30	2	1	320	171
Hércules	2010–11	La Liga	31	12	0	0	—		—		31	12
Baniyas	2011–12	UAE Pro League	3	0	0	0	—		1 (Note: Appearance in UAE League Cup)	0	4	0
River Plate	2011–12	Primera B Nacional	19	13	2	1	—		—		21	14
River Plate	2012–13	Primera División	16	3	0	0	—		—		16	3
River Plate	Total		35	16	2	1	—		—		37	17
Newell's Old Boys	2013–14	Primera División	24	7	0	0	6 (Note: Appearances in Copa Libertadores)	2	—		30	9
Pune City	2014	Indian Super League	9	2	0	0	—		—		9	2
Career total			445	227	23	4	82	40	9	2	559	273

=== International ===
Appearances and goals by national team and year
National team	Year	Apps	Goals
France	1998	12	2
France	1999	2	1
France	2000	12	9
France	2001	7	5
France	2002	7	3
France	2003	8	8
France	2004	7	1
France	2005	5	2
France	2006	8	3
France	2007	2	0
France	2008	1	0
Total		71	34

Scores and results list France's goal tally first, score column indicates score after each Trezeguet goal.

List of international goals scored by David Trezeguet
No.	Date	Venue	Opponent	Score	Result	Competition
1	5 June 1998	Helsinki Olympic Stadium, Helsinki, Finland	Finland	1–0	1–0	Friendly
2	18 June 1998	Stade de France, Saint-Denis, France	Saudi Arabia	2–0	4–0	1998 FIFA World Cup
3	9 October 1999	Stade de France, Saint-Denis, France	Iceland	3–2	3–2	UEFA Euro 2000 qualifying
4	26 April 2000	Stade de France, Saint-Denis, France	Slovenia	1–2	3–2	Friendly
5	26 April 2000	Stade de France, Saint-Denis, France	Slovenia	3–2	3–2	Friendly
6	28 May 2000	Stadion Maksimir, Zagreb, Croatia	Croatia	2–0	2–0	Friendly
7	21 June 2000	Amsterdam Arena, Amsterdam, Netherlands	Netherlands	2–1	2–3	UEFA Euro 2000
8	2 July 2000	De Kuip, Rotterdam, Netherlands	Italy	2–1	2–1	UEFA Euro 2000
9	16 August 2000	Stade Vélodrome, Marseille, France	FIFA XI	1–0	5–1	Friendly
10	16 August 2000	Stade Vélodrome, Marseille, France	FIFA XI	2–0	5–1	Friendly
11	16 August 2000	Stade Vélodrome, Marseille, France	FIFA XI	3–0	5–1	Friendly
12	15 November 2000	BJK İnönü Stadium, Istanbul, Turkey	Turkey	1–0	4–0	Friendly
13	24 March 2001	Stade de France, Saint-Denis, France	Japan	4–0	5–0	Friendly
14	24 March 2001	Stade de France, Saint-Denis, France	Japan	5–0	5–0	Friendly
15	28 March 2001	Mestalla Stadium, Valencia, Spain	Spain	1–2	1–2	Friendly
16	1 September 2001	Estadio Nacional, Santiago, Chile	Chile	1–2	1–2	Friendly
17	11 November 2001	Cricket Ground, Melbourne, Australia	Australia	1–1	1–1	Friendly
18	27 March 2002	Stade de France, Saint-Denis, France	Scotland	2–0	5–0	Friendly
19	27 March 2002	Stade de France, Saint-Denis, France	Scotland	4–0	5–0	Friendly
20	26 May 2002	World Cup Stadium, Suwon, South Korea	South Korea	1–0	3–2	Friendly
21	29 March 2003	Stade Félix-Bollaert, Lens, France	Malta	5–0	6–0	UEFA Euro 2004 qualifying
22	2 April 2003	Stadio Renzo Barbera, Palermo, Italy	Israel	1–1	2–1	UEFA Euro 2004 qualifying
23	6 September 2003	Stade de France, Saint-Denis, France	Cyprus	1–0	5–0	UEFA Euro 2004 qualifying
24	6 September 2003	Stade de France, Saint-Denis, France	Cyprus	5–0	5–0	UEFA Euro 2004 qualifying
25	10 September 2003	Bežigrad Stadium, Ljubljana, Slovenia	Slovenia	1–0	2–0	UEFA Euro 2004 qualifying
26	11 October 2003	Stade de France, Saint-Denis, France	Israel	2–0	3–0	UEFA Euro 2004 qualifying
27	15 November 2003	Arena AufSchalke, Gelsenkirchen, Germany	Germany	2–0	3–0	Friendly
28	15 November 2003	Arena AufSchalke, Gelsenkirchen, Germany	Germany	3–0	3–0	Friendly
29	17 June 2004	Estádio Dr. Magalhães Pessoa, Leiria, Portugal	Croatia	2–2	2–2	UEFA Euro 2004
30	9 February 2005	Stade de France, Saint-Denis, France	Sweden	1–1	1–1	Friendly
31	30 March 2005	Ramat Gan Stadium, Ramat Gan, Israel	Israel	1–0	1–1	2006 FIFA World Cup qualification
32	7 June 2006	Stade Geoffroy-Guichard, Saint-Étienne, France	China	1–0	3–1	Friendly
33	11 October 2006	Stade Auguste Bonal, Montbéliard, France	Faroe Islands	4–0	5–0	UEFA Euro 2008 qualifying
34	11 October 2006	Stade Auguste Bonal, Montbéliard, France	Faroe Islands	5–0	5–0	UEFA Euro 2008 qualifying

== Honours ==
Monaco

- Division 1: 1996–97, 1999–2000
- Trophée des Champions: 1997

Juventus

- Serie A: 2001–02, 2002–03
- Serie B: 2006–07
- Supercoppa Italiana: 2003

River Plate

- Primera B Nacional: 2011–12

France

- FIFA World Cup: 1998, runner-up: 2006
- UEFA European Championship: 2000

Individual

- FIFA World Youth Championship Silver Shoe: 1997
- UNFP Division 1 Young Player of the Year: 1997–98
- UEFA Team of the Year: 2001
- Serie A Footballer of the Year: 2001–02
- Serie A Foreign Footballer of the Year: 2001–02
- Capocannoniere: 2001–02
- FIFA 100
- Golden Foot: 2015 (Under the category of "Football Legend")
- Juventus Greatest XI of All Time: 2017
- Juventus FC Hall of Fame: 2025

Orders

- Knight of the Legion of Honour: 1998
