= Delaroche =

Delaroche is a surname. Notable people with the surname include:

- Christine Delaroche (born 1944), French actress and singer
- François-Étienne de La Roche (or Delaroche) (1781 – 1813), Swiss ichthyologist
- Hippolyte Delaroche (a.k.a. Paul Delaroche, 1797 – 1856), French painter
- Marc Delaroche (born 1971), French footballer
- Mazo de la Roche (1879 – 1961), Canadian author
