= Emmanuel Petit =

French footballer (born 1970)

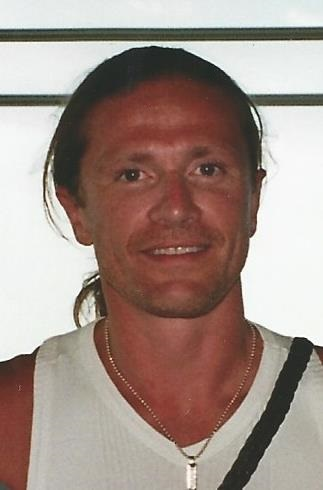
- Petit in 2005

Personal information
- Full name: Emmanuel Laurent Petit
- Date of birth: 22 September 1970 (age 56)
- Place of birth: Dieppe, Seine-Maritime, France
- Height: 1.85 m (6 ft 1 in)
- Position: Defensive midfielder

Youth career
- 1977–1985: Arques-la-Bataille
- 1985–1989: Monaco

Senior career*
Years	Team	Apps	(Gls)
1988–1997	Monaco	222	(4)
1997–2000	Arsenal	85	(9)
2000–2001	Barcelona	23	(1)
2001–2004	Chelsea	55	(2)
Total		385	(16)

International career
1990–2003	France	63	(6)
Medal record
Men's football
Representing France
FIFA World Cup
Winner	1998 France
UEFA European Championship
Winner	2000 Belgium–Netherlands
- * Club domestic league appearances and goals

Emmanuel Laurent Petit (French pronunciation: [emanɥɛl lɔʁɑ̃ pəti]; born 22 September 1970) is a French former professional footballer who played as a defensive midfielder at club level for Arsenal, Barcelona, Monaco, and Chelsea. He represented France at international level in two FIFA World Cups and two UEFA European Championships; he scored the third goal in France's 3–0 victory in the 1998 FIFA World Cup Final and was also a member of the French squad that won UEFA Euro 2000. He was known for his strong defensive abilities, including tackling, interceptions, and marking, as well as his passing range and ability to transition play from defense to attack. In his prime, he was one of the best left-footed players in European and world football.

== Early life ==
Emmanuel Laurent Petit was born on 22 September 1970 in Dieppe, Seine-Maritime, and grew up in Arques-la-Bataille, Seine-Maritime.

== Club career ==
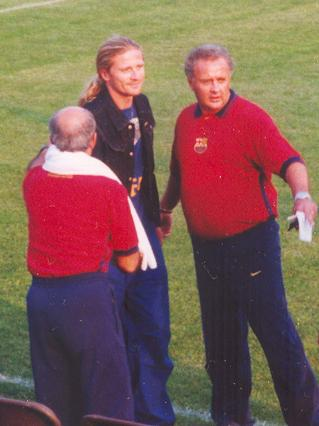
Petit (centre) in 2000

Petit began his career at minor club ES Arques-la-Bataille before being signed by Arsène Wenger's Monaco side at the age of 18. He made his debut soon after and played in the 1989 Coupe de France final. Petit became a regular at Monaco, playing as a left-sided or central midfielder. In 1991, he won the Coupe de France with Monaco and also played in the 1992 European Cup Winners' Cup final (which Monaco lost to Werder Bremen). In 1996–97, his final season at Monaco, he captained his side to the Ligue 1 title.

Petit joined Arsenal in June 1997 for £2.5 million, where he was reunited with his former Monaco manager Arsène Wenger. Wenger switched Petit from central midfielder to defensive midfielder, and partnered him with fellow Frenchman Patrick Vieira. The French duo formed a midfield partnership which brought instant success, as Petit won the double with Arsenal in his very first season, clinching both the Premier League title and the FA Cup. Altogether, in the three seasons in his Arsenal career, Petit made 118 appearances and scored 11 goals, including a stunning drive from outside the area against Derby County (which was also the winning goal), during the 1997–98 season.

Petit moved to Barcelona (together with Arsenal teammate Marc Overmars) in the summer of 2000 for £7 million (€14 million). At Barcelona, he was moved back into defence and suffered a rash of niggling injuries. As a result, he failed to settle and could not hold down a regular place. In his biography, published in 2008, the midfielder gave his time at Barcelona a special chapter in which he exposed that coach Lorenzo Serra Ferrer did not even know what position he played when he joined the team. His only goal for Barcelona came on 13 May 2001 at home to Rayo Vallecano in a 5–1 win.

After his first season at the Camp Nou, Petit was linked with moves back to England with Manchester United, Tottenham and Chelsea, joining the latter in 2001 in a £7.5 million transfer deal. He initially was a first-team regular for the Blues in a largely disappointing first season and played in the 2002 FA Cup final which Chelsea lost to his old club, Arsenal. He scored his first goal for Chelsea in a 2–1 win over Derby on 30 March 2002. His second season saw a significant improvement, as he formed an impressive midfield partnership with Frank Lampard as Chelsea impressed in the winner-takes-all final game of the season against Liverpool as Chelsea secured the fourth UEFA Champions League berth. He also scored twice throughout the season: against Everton in the League Cup, and former club Arsenal in the league. After a series of knee injuries, however, he spent much of the final season of his career on the sidelines, and he was released on a free transfer in the summer of 2004, his final appearance for the club coming against Blackburn Rovers on 1 February 2004.

After being released by Chelsea, Petit rejected the chance to sign for Bolton Wanderers, and he announced his retirement on 20 January 2005 after failing to fully recover following knee surgery.

== International career ==
Playing for the France national team, Petit earned 63 caps and scored six international goals in his career and won the 1998 FIFA World Cup and UEFA Euro 2000. He scored twice in the 1998 FIFA World Cup, the first from a powerful shot from just outside the box against Denmark, which turned out to be the match winner, and a second in the final against Brazil. The goal he scored in the final was particularly memorable, as he had embarked on an optimistic run across field before calmly slotting in the goal in the final minute of regular time. That same goal happened to be the 1,000th goal in the history of the French Football Federation and the last FIFA World Cup Finals goal of the 20th century. France won the match 3–0. An earlier Petit corner kick had set up Zinedine Zidane's header for France's first goal. Petit was also part of the 2002 FIFA World Cup squad, though France failed to advance past the group stages and failed to score a single goal in three matches during their defence of the trophy.

Petit retired from international football in September 2003.

== Style of play ==
Although capable of playing as a defender, Petit usually played as a defensive midfielder throughout his career, and was known for his energy, work-rate, strength, tackling, aerial prowess, and positional intelligence in this position, as well as his elegance, his passing range, and his striking ability from distance with his left foot; as such, he was not only capable of breaking up attacks, but of dictating play in midfield, creating chances for teammates, and even scoring goals.

== Personal life ==
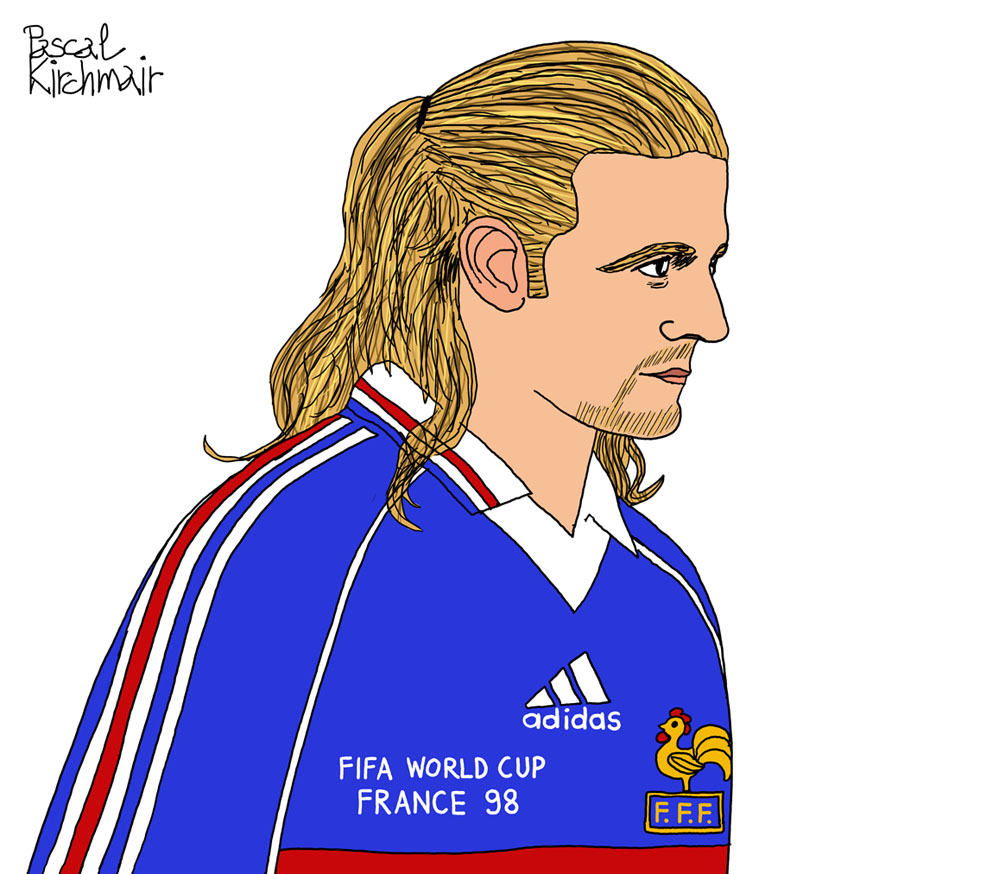
Portarit drawing of Petit

Petit married French actress Agathe de La Fontaine, in 2000, but they divorced in 2002 after having two children, Zoe and Louise Petit. He now shares his life with Maria Servello, with whom he had another child, Violet, in 2007. He has often appeared on French TV as a football analyst.

His brother Olivier was an amateur footballer when Petit was a teenager. While playing for his club Arques in 1988, Olivier collapsed and was rushed to hospital where he was pronounced dead due to a blood clot of the brain. In his biography, Petit explained that this event shocked him to such an extent that it almost made him quit football. He viewed his brother as a gifted young man who had good looks and did well in all his endeavours, whether it was football or education. At age 18, he was already facing the demanding rigors of the Monaco youth academy, and not so soon, he had lost his grandfather. His brother's and grandfather's loss happened in a bracket of two years and the passing of his brother almost became the final straw. Petit wore the number 17 shirt in club football throughout his career as 17 was his brother's age when he died.

He starred as himself in a Christmas special episode of British police show The Bill in 1998. Petit has been an ambassador for the Homeless World Cup movement since the tournament was hosted by Paris in 2011.

== Career statistics ==
=== Club ===
Appearances and goals by club, season and competition
Club	Season	League			National cup (Note: Includes Coupe de France, FA Cup, Copa del Rey)		League cup (Note: Includes Coupe de la Ligue, Football League Cup)		Continental		Other		Total	
Club	Season	Division	Apps	Goals	Apps	Goals	Apps	Goals	Apps	Goals	Apps	Goals	Apps	Goals
Monaco	1988–89	Division 1	9	0	9	1	–		0	0	–		18	1
Monaco	1989–90	Division 1	28	0	1	0	–		7 (Note: Appearances in UEFA Cup Winners' Cup)	0	–		36	0
Monaco	1990–91	Division 1	27	1	6	0	–		5 (Note: Appearances in UEFA Cup)	0	–		38	1
Monaco	1991–92	Division 1	28	0	4	0	–		7	0	–		39	0
Monaco	1992–93	Division 1	25	1	2	0	–		–		–		27	1
Monaco	1993–94	Division 1	28	0	2	0	–		10 (Note: Appearances in UEFA Champions League)	0	–		40	0
Monaco	1994–95	Division 1	25	1	1	0	1	0	–		–		27	1
Monaco	1995–96	Division 1	23	1	3	0	0	0	1	0	–		27	1
Monaco	1996–97	Division 1	29	0	1	0	3	0	7	0	–		40	0
Monaco	Total		222	4	29	1	4	0	37	0	–		292	5
Arsenal	1997–98	Premier League	32	2	7	0	3	0	2	0	–		44	2
Arsenal	1998–99	Premier League	26	4	3	2	0	0	3	0	1 (Note: Appearance in FA Charity Shield)	0	33	6
Arsenal	1999–2000	Premier League	27	3	3	0	0	0	10 (Note: Two appearances in UEFA Champions League, eight appearances in UEFA Cup)	0	1	0	41	3
Arsenal	Total		85	9	13	2	3	0	15	0	2	0	118	11
Barcelona	2000–01	La Liga	23	1	5	0	–		10 (Note: Four appearances in UEFA Champions League, six appearances in UEFA Cup)	0	–		38	1
Chelsea	2001–02	Premier League	27	1	6	0	2	0	3	0	–		38	1
Chelsea	2002–03	Premier League	24	1	5	0	1	1	1	0	–		31	2
Chelsea	2003–04	Premier League	4	0	1	0	0	0	2	0	–		7	0
Chelsea	Total		55	2	12	0	3	1	6	0	–		76	3
Career total			385	16	59	3	10	1	68	0	2	0	524	20

=== International ===
Appearances and goals by national team and year
National team	Year	Apps	Goals
France	1990	1	0
France	1991	0	0
France	1992	5	0
France	1993	7	0
France	1994	1	0
France	1995	0	0
France	1996	1	0
France	1997	2	0
France	1998	10	2
France	1999	5	1
France	2000	14	1
France	2001	7	1
France	2002	9	1
France	2003	1	0
Total		63	6

Scores and results list France's goal tally first, score column indicates score after each Petit goal.

List of international goals scored by Emmanuel Petit
No.	Date	Venue	Opponent	Score	Result	Competition
1	24 June 1998	Stade de Gerland, Lyon, France	Denmark	2–1	2–1	1998 FIFA World Cup
2	12 July 1998	Stade de France, Saint-Denis, France	Brazil	3–0	3–0	1998 FIFA World Cup
3	5 June 1999	Stade de France, Saint-Denis, France	Russia	1–1	2–3	UEFA Euro 2000 qualifying
4	2 September 2000	Stade de France, Saint-Denis, France	England	1–0	1–1	Friendly
5	6 October 2001	Stade de France, Saint-Denis, France	Algeria	2–0	4–1	Friendly
6	13 February 2002	Stade de France, Saint-Denis, France	Romania	2–0	2–1	Friendly

== Honours ==
Monaco

- Division 1: 1996–97
- Coupe de France: 1990–91
- European Cup Winners' Cup runner-up: 1991–92

Arsenal

- Premier League: 1997–98
- FA Cup: 1997–98
- FA Charity Shield: 1998, 1999
- UEFA Cup runner-up: 1999–2000

Chelsea

- FA Cup runner-up: 2001–02

France

- FIFA World Cup: 1998
- UEFA European Championship: 2000

Individual

- Division 1 Rookie of the Year: 1990
- Ballon d'Or twelfth place: 1998, nominee: 1999
- Premier League Player of the Month: April 1998
- Onze de Bronze: 1998
- PFA Premier League Team of the Year: 1998–99

=== Orders ===
- Knight of the Legion of Honour: 1998
