= Jorge Trezeguet =

Argentine footballer

Personal information
- Full name: Jorge Ernesto Trezeguet
- Date of birth: 13 May 1951 (age 75)
- Place of birth: Morón, Argentina
- Position: Defender

Senior career*
Years	Team	Apps	(Gls)
	Chacarita Juniors	14	(1)
	Estudiantes (BA)	81	(2)
1976–1979	FC Rouen	7	(0)
	Almagro	33	(1)
	Deportivo Español	57	(14)
	Sportivo Italiano	33	(7)
	El Porvenir	14	(0)
Total		239	(25)
- * Club domestic league appearances and goals

Jorge Ernesto Trezeguet (born 13 May 1951) is an Argentine former professional footballer who played as a defender. He is the father of David Trezeguet.

== Career ==
Born in Morón, Trezeguet played for Estudiantes (BA), Almagro, Deportivo Español, Sportivo Italiano, El Porvenir and Chacarita Juniors in Argentina, as well as FC Rouen in France.

He was provisionally banned for failing a doping control in 1974 while playing for Estudiantes (BA) in the second-tier Primera B Nacional along with two teammates. He was subsequently pardoned, but his career was adversely impacted by the allegations.

Trezeguet later worked as the agent for his son David, as well as a European scout for Juventus.
