= Sonny Anderson =

Brazilian footballer (born 1970)

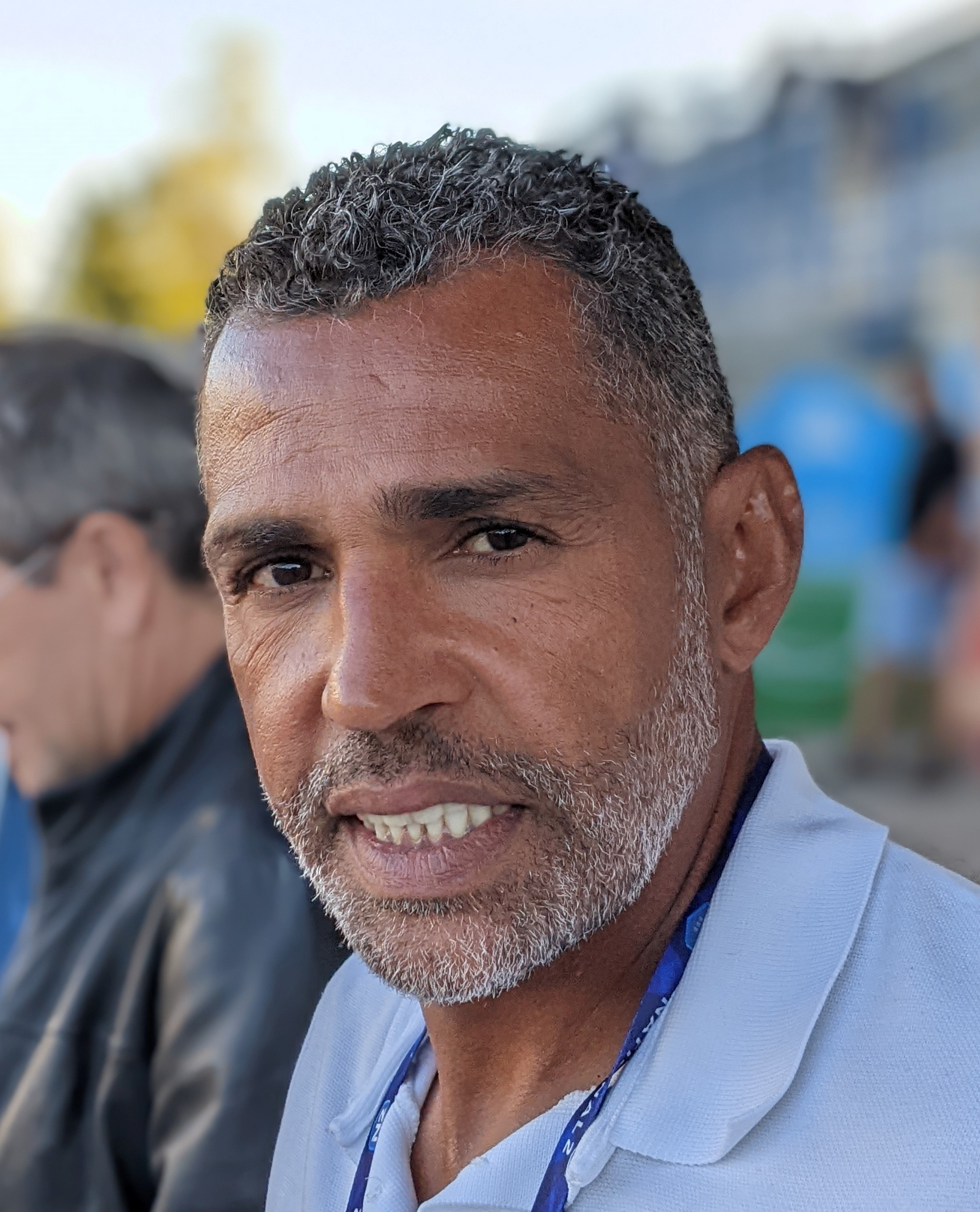
- Sonny Anderson in 2022

Personal information
- Full name: Anderson da Silva
- Date of birth: 19 September 1970 (age 56)
- Place of birth: Goiatuba, Brazil
- Height: 1.81 m (5 ft 11 in)
- Position: Striker

Youth career
- 1987: XV de Jaú

Senior career*
Years	Team	Apps	(Gls)
1988–1991	Vasco da Gama	42	(1)
1992	Guarani	18	(4)
1992–1994	Servette	52	(31)
1994	Marseille	20	(16)
1994–1997	Monaco	91	(51)
1997–1999	Barcelona	47	(16)
1999–2003	Lyon	110	(71)
2003–2004	Villarreal	38	(13)
2004–2005	Al-Rayyan	20	(24)
2005–2006	Al-Gharafa	19	(6)
Total		457	(231)

International career
1987	Brazil U17	2	(0)
1989	Brazil U20	6	(3)
1997–2001	Brazil	6	(1)

Managerial career
- 2011: Neuchâtel Xamax
- * Club domestic league appearances and goals

Anderson da Silva (born 19 September 1970), better known as Sonny Anderson, is a Brazilian former professional footballer who played as a striker. A prolific goalscorer at the club level, he was best known for his spells with Lyon, Monaco (he played most of his abroad career in France, amassing Ligue 1 totals of 221 matches and 138 goals) and Barcelona.

He participated with Brazil in the 2001 Confederations Cup, and won a total of six caps for his country, scoring one goal.

== Club career ==
Born in Goiatuba, Goiás, Anderson started playing professionally with CR Vasco da Gama, but failed to make an early impression. After failing to score in 18 matches in his last year, he moved to Guarani.

Anderson's first abroad experience came with Servette FC, and his impact was instant, scoring 18 goals in his first season then helping the club to the national league in the following by netting 11 in just the first half of the campaign, as he left in January 1994 to Olympique de Marseille.

After six months, with L'OM relegated due to a bribery scandal, Anderson moved to fellow Division 1 side AS Monaco FC, scoring at an equally impressive pace and winning team (1997 league) and individual accolades alike.

In 1997, Anderson joined FC Barcelona: having to battle for first-choice status with the likes of Luis Enrique and Patrick Kluivert, he fared well, scoring ten times in La Liga alone in his first season, as the Catalans won the double. In his second year, which included some run-ins with manager Louis van Gaal, he played less, which prompted a return to France with rising Olympique Lyonnais, for approximately €18 million. He would be a very important attacking figure as the team won the first two of seven consecutive national championships.

Aged 33, free agent Anderson returned to Spain with Villarreal CF. In his only full campaign he scored 12 times, including against Real Madrid (1–0, after only two minutes on the pitch), former club Barcelona (2–1, in the 89th minute) and Valencia CF (1–0), while also helping the Yellow Submarine to the semifinals of the UEFA Cup.

After being instrumental in Villarreal's 2004 UEFA Intertoto Cup win, Anderson finished his career in Qatar. He then returned to Lyon, going on work with the team's strikers.

In June 2007, Anderson played a farewell match at the Stade de Gerland, in a match facing his friends and the 2002 French champions. Four years later he rescinded his link with Lyon and started a coaching career, joining Neuchâtel Xamax in Switzerland. On 24 July, after only two league games, he was sacked.

== International career ==
Anderson could not translate his club success to the international front. He only won six caps for the Brazil side, the first coming in a friendly against South Korea on 11 August 1997, in which he scored his only international goal. He was also a member of the team that took part at the 2001 FIFA Confederations Cup, and obtained his final international cap that same year.

== Career statistics ==
=== Club ===
Appearances and goals by club, season and competition
Club	Season	League			National cup		League cup		Continental		Other		Total	
Club	Season	Division	Apps	Goals	Apps	Goals	Apps	Goals	Apps	Goals	Apps	Goals	Apps	Goals
Vasco	1988	Série A	3	0	0	0	0	0	0	0	—		3	0
Vasco	1989	Série A	9	0	0	0	0	0	0	0	—		9	0
Vasco	1990	Série A	12	1	0	0	0	0	5	0	—		17	1
Vasco	1991	Série A	18	0	0	0	0	0	0	0	—		18	0
Vasco	Total		42	1	0	0	0	0	5	0	0	0	47	1
Guarani	1992	Série A	18	4	0	0	0	0	0	0	0	0	18	4
Servette	1992–93	Nationalliga A	35	20	—		—		—		—		35	20
Servette	1993–94	Nationalliga A	17	11	—		—		4 (Note: Appearances in UEFA Cup)	2	—		21	13
Servette	Total		52	31	0	0	0	0	4	2	0	0	56	33
Marseille	1993–94	Division 1	20	16	—		—		—		—		20	16
Monaco	1994–95	Division 1	23	11	1	2	3	3	—		—		27	16
Monaco	1995–96	Division 1	34	21	1	0	2	1	2	1	—		39	23
Monaco	1996–97	Division 1	34	19	0	0	3	4	10	4	—		47	27
Monaco	Total		91	51	2	2	8	8	12	5	0	0	113	66
Barcelona	1997–98	La Liga	23	10	5	0	—		5 (Note: Appearances in UEFA Champions League)	1	4 (Note: Two appearances in UEFA Super Cup, two appearances in Supercopa de España)	0	37	11
Barcelona	1998–99	La Liga	24	6	1	0	—		6	4	—		31	10
Barcelona	Total		47	16	6	0	0	0	11	5	4	0	68	21
Lyon	1999–2000	Division 1	32	23	2	0	3	2	8 (Note: Six appearances and three goals in UEFA Cup, two appearances in UEFA Champions League)	3	—		45	28
Lyon	2000–01	Division 1	29	22	4	2	3	2	14	5	—		50	31
Lyon	2001–02	Division 1	25	14	2	1	2	0	5 (Note: Four appearances and three goals in UEFA Cup, one appearance in UEFA Champions League)	3	—		34	18
Lyon	2002–03	Division 1	24	12	0	0	0	0	7 (Note: Six appearances and five goals in UEFA Champions League, one appearance in UEFA Cup)	5	1 (Note: Appearance in Trophée des Champions)	0	32	17
Lyon	Total		110	71	8	3	8	4	34	16	1	0	161	94
Villarreal	2003–04	La Liga	35	12	0	0	—		18 (Note: Twelve appearances and six goals in UEFA Cup, six appearances and one goal in UEFA Intertoto Cup)	7	—		53	19
Villarreal	2004–05	La Liga	3	1	0	0	—		7 (Note: Seven appearances and four goals in UEFA Intertoto Cup)	4	—		10	5
Villarreal	Total		38	13	0	0	0	0	25	11	0	0	63	24
Al-Rayyan	2004–05	Qatar Stars League	20	24	0	0	0	0	0	0	0	0	20	24
Al-Gharafa	2005–06	Qatar Stars League	19	6	0	0	0	0	0	0	0	0	19	6
Career total			457	233	16	5	16	12	91	39	5	0	585	289

== Honours ==
Vasco da Gama

- Campeonato Brasileiro Série A: 1989

Servette

- Swiss Super League: 1993–94

Monaco

- Ligue 1: 1996–97

Barcelona

- La Liga: 1997–98, 1998–99
- Copa del Rey: 1997–98
- UEFA Super Cup: 1997

Lyon

- Ligue 1: 2001–02, 2002–03
- Coupe de la Ligue: 2000–01
- Trophée des Champions: 2002

Villarreal

- UEFA Intertoto Cup: 2003, 2004

Individual

- Swiss Super League Top Scorer: 1992–93
- Swiss Super League Best Foreign Player: 1992–93
- Ligue 1 Top Scorer: 1995–96, 1999–2000, 2000–01
- Ligue 1 Étoile d'Or: 1995–96
- Ligue 1 Best Player: 1996–97
- UEFA Cup Top Scorer: 2003–04 (6 goals)
- Qatar Stars League Top Scorer: 2004–05 (24 goals)
