= Lilian Martin =

French footballer (born 1971)

Personal information
- Date of birth: 28 May 1971 (age 55)
- Place of birth: Valréas, Vaucluse, France
- Height: 1.80 m (5 ft 11 in)
- Position: Right-back

Senior career*
Years	Team	Apps	(Gls)
1988–1990	ASOA Valence		
1990–1992	Nancy	44	(10)
1992–1993	Dijon	23	(4)
1993–1996	USL Dunkerque	108	(9)
1996–1999	Monaco	43	(0)
1999–2000	Marseille	2	(0)
2000–2001	Derby County	9	(0)
2002	Hibernian	1	(0)
2002	JS Saint Jean Beaulieu	1	(0)

Managerial career
- 2007–2008: Imperia
- * Club domestic league appearances and goals

Lilian Martin (born 28 May 1971) is a French former professional footballer who played as a right-back. He was a regular set-piece taker.

== Early life and playing career ==
Martin was born in Valréas, Vaucluse. He started his career at ASOA Valence. After two seasons in the Championnat National club, he joined AS Nancy. After scoring nine goals in his first season with the club, his second year had less success after the team was relegated to the French Division 2. He moved to Dijon FCO in the following season and was transferred to USL Dunkerque in 1993.

After three seasons with the French Division 2 club, he joined AS Monaco. He played 26 league matches in his first season of the match, mostly as a starter, and won the 1996–97 French Division 1 as well as reaching the 1996–97 UEFA Cup semifinals in which he played the second leg against Inter Milan. Martin had his opportunities limited in the next season due to a groin injury, but started in both 1997–98 UEFA Champions League semifinal matches against Juventus when the club was knocked out of the competition. He had only ten league appearances in the 1998–99 season and joined Marseille after the season.

Martin started a single league match for OM in December 1999, also featuring a substitute later in the season. After no appearances in the beginning of the 2000–01 season, he moved to Derby County on a free transfer until the end of the season. He played nine league matches and was released after the season.

He joined Hibernian early in 2002 in a two-year contract after an invite from Franck Sauzée, recently appointed as player-manager. However, Sauzée was fired less than three months after in charge and Martin could not communicate with new manager Bobby Williamson, which led him to leave the club and return to France. After six months, he played for amateur club JS Saint Jean Beaulieu before ending his career.

== Managerial career ==
Martin was appointed manager of Imperia, a club in the Italian Serie D. He was sacked after the club suffered financial problems and had to be sold. He also worked with AS Monaco youth sides.

== Honours ==
Monaco

- Division 1: 1996–97
- Trophée des Champions: 1997
