= Laurent Viaud =

French retired footballer (born 1969)

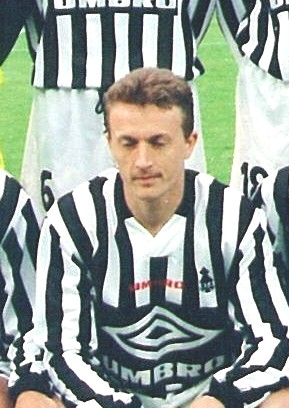
- Viaud in 1998

Personal information
- Full name: Laurent Viaud
- Date of birth: 8 October 1969 (age 57)
- Place of birth: Nantes, France
- Height: 1.75 m (5 ft 9 in)
- Position: Midfielder

Senior career*
Years	Team	Apps	(Gls)
1989–1993	Angers	128	(9)
1993–1997	Monaco	97	(5)
1997–1998	Rennes	36	(1)
1999–2000	Extremadura	58	(5)
2000–2002	Laval	68	(11)
2002–2005	Albacete	92	(2)
2005–2006	Saumur		
Total		479	(33)
- * Club domestic league appearances and goals

Laurent Viaud (born 8 October 1969 in Nantes) is a French former footballer who played as a midfielder.

== Football career ==
After starting out professionally with Angers SCO in the second division, Viaud moved to AS Monaco FC, making his Ligue 1 debut on 23 July 1993 in a 0–1 away loss against FC Nantes. Gradually imposing himself in the starting XI, he contributed with 24 matches in the 1996–97 season as the club won the national title after nine years.

At almost 30, in January 1999, Viaud moved abroad, playing one 1/2 seasons with lowly Extremadura CF, one in each major division. He then returned to France with second level's Stade Lavallois, then went back to Spain, appearing for another modest side, Albacete Balompié, again in La Liga and the second level.

After one season with amateurs Olympique Saumur FC, Viaud retired from the game, eventually becoming a scout for Premier League club Liverpool.
