= Martin Djetou =

French footballer (born 1974)

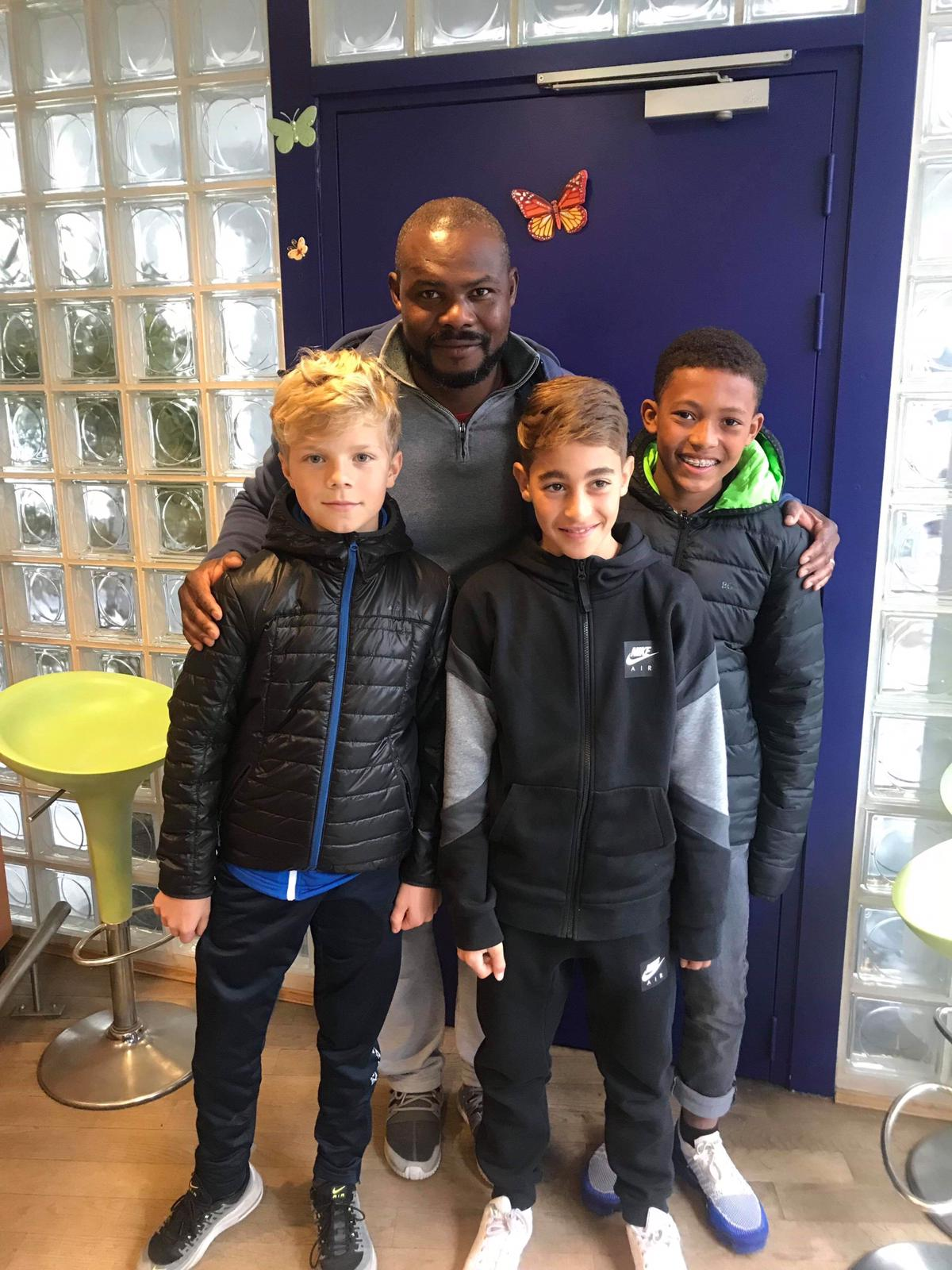
- Djetou in 2018

Personal information
- Full name: Martin Okelo Djetou
- Date of birth: 15 December 1974 (age 51)
- Place of birth: Brogohlo, Ivory Coast
- Height: 6 ft 2 in (1.88 m)
- Position: Defender

Senior career*
Years	Team	Apps	(Gls)
1992–1996	Strasbourg	84	(1)
1996–2001	Monaco	116	(3)
2001–2005	Parma	23	(2)
2002–2004	→ Fulham (loan)	51	(1)
2005	Nice	5	(0)
2005–2006	Bolton Wanderers	3	(0)
2006	Istres	10	(1)
2007	SC Schiltigheim	2	(0)
Total		294	(8)

International career
1996–2000	France	6	(0)
- * Club domestic league appearances and goals

Martin Okelo Djetou (born 15 December 1974) is a French former professional footballer who played as a defender.

== Club career ==
Djetou was born in Brogohlo, in the Ivory Coast. His clubs included Strasbourg, Monaco, Parma, Fulham, Nice, Bolton Wanderers and Istres and SC Schiltigheim. At Monaco he was part of the squad that won Ligue 1 in 1997 and 2000.

Djetou made his name as a powerful defensive midfielder for Monaco, most notably dominating a Champions League quarter final against Manchester United in 1998. Following that game Djetou - who also played in defence - was linked with a host of top European clubs, but chose Parma as his next destination.

Prior to his brief spell at Bolton, his only other experience in English football came by the way of a two-year loan spell at Fulham where he amassed over half a century of appearances (and scored the winner against Leeds United in a 1–0 win in December 2002) but a permanent deal could not be agreed with Italian club Parma.

In November 2006 he was awarded a trial at English club Leeds United but was not offered a permanent deal. After his spell with Bolton, he moved back to France, joining up with Istres. However, after some sluggish performances, he was released from his contract in 2006.

In 2007, he stopped his professional career, started to play for SC Schiltigheim (amateur) and retired in summer 2008.

== International career ==
The Ivorian-born Djetou won full international honours with France, the country in which he grew up. He played on the French team at the 1996 Summer Olympics. He was in France's preliminary squad of 28 players for the 1998 FIFA World Cup on home soil, but was one of six players dropped by head coach Aime Jacquet in the final cut prior to the start of the tournament. France went on to be victorious in the tournament and become national heroes.

== Personal life ==
In 2007, Djetou opened a beauty parlour, in the town of Illkirch (Espace Djétou).

== Honours ==
Strasbourg

- UEFA Intertoto Cup: 1995

Monaco

- Ligue 1: 1996–97
- Ligue 1: 1999–2000
- Trophée des Champions: 2000

Parma

- Coppa Italia: 2001–02
