= 1995–96 French Division 1 =

58th season of French Division 1

Division 1
- Season: 1995–96
- Dates: 18 July 1995 – 18 May 1996
- Champions: Auxerre (1st title)
- Relegated: Gueugnon; Saint-Étienne; Martigues
- Matches: 380
- Goals: 867 (2.28 per match)
- Best Player: Zinedine Zidane
- Top goalscorer: Sonny Anderson (21)

The 1995–96 Division 1 season was the 58th since its establishment. Auxerre won their first league title in history with 72 points.

== Participating teams ==
- Auxerre
- Bastia
- Bordeaux
- AS Cannes
- FC Gueugnon
- EA Guingamp
- Le Havre AC
- RC Lens
- Lille OSC
- Olympique Lyonnais
- FC Martigues
- FC Metz
- AS Monaco
- Montpellier HSC
- FC Nantes Atlantique
- OGC Nice
- Paris Saint-Germain FC
- Stade Rennais FC
- AS Saint-Étienne
- RC Strasbourg
Location of teams in 1995–96 Division 1

== League table ==
Pos	Team	Pld	W	D	L	GF	GA	GD	Pts	Qualification or relegation
1	Auxerre (C)	38	22	6	10	66	30	+36	72	Qualification to Champions League group stage
2	Paris Saint-Germain	38	19	11	8	65	36	+29	68	Qualification to Cup Winners' Cup first round (Note: Paris Saint-Germain qualified for the Cup Winners' Cup as defending champions.)
3	Monaco	38	19	11	8	64	39	+25	68	Qualification to UEFA Cup first round
4	Metz	38	18	11	9	42	30	+12	65	Qualification to UEFA Cup first round
5	Lens	38	16	15	7	45	31	+14	63	Qualification to UEFA Cup first round
6	Montpellier	38	17	9	12	51	40	+11	60	Qualification to UEFA Cup first round
7	Nantes	38	14	13	11	44	42	+2	55	Qualification to Intertoto Cup group stage
8	Rennes	38	13	15	10	44	41	+3	54	Qualification to Intertoto Cup group stage
9	Strasbourg	38	14	12	12	46	44	+2	54	Qualification to Intertoto Cup group stage
10	Guingamp	38	13	14	11	34	33	+1	53	Qualification to Intertoto Cup group stage
11	Lyon	38	10	18	10	41	41	0	48	
12	Nice	38	12	9	17	37	44	−7	45	
13	Le Havre	38	11	12	15	33	45	−12	45	
14	Cannes	38	12	8	18	45	51	−6	44	
15	Bastia	38	12	8	18	45	55	−10	44	
16	Bordeaux	38	11	9	18	44	52	−8	42	
17	Lille	38	9	12	17	27	50	−23	39	
18	Gueugnon (R)	38	8	14	16	27	46	−19	38	Relegation to French Division 2
19	Saint-Étienne (R)	38	6	16	16	36	59	−23	34	Relegation to French Division 2
20	Martigues (R)	38	9	7	22	31	58	−27	34	Relegation to French Division 2

Source: Ligue 1
Rules for classification: 1) points; 2) goal difference; 3) number of goals scored.
(C) Champions; (R) Relegated
Notes:

Promoted from Ligue 2, who will play in Division 1 season 1996/1997

- SM Caen : champion of Ligue 2
- Olympique Marseille : runners-up
- AS Nancy : 3rd place

== Results ==
Home \ Away	AUX	BAS	BOR	CAN	GUE	GUI	LHA	RCL	LIL	OL	MAR	MET	ASM	MHS	FCN	NIC	PSG	REN	STE	RCS
Auxerre		3–0	2–0	5–1	4–0	1–2	1–0	0–1	1–2	2–0	4–0	0–0	1–2	1–0	2–1	2–1	3–0	2–1	2–0	1–0
Bastia	1–1		2–0	2–1	1–2	0–1	1–0	3–2	4–0	0–0	2–0	1–0	2–1	1–0	4–1	1–2	2–2	0–0	0–0	1–1
Bordeaux	0–1	1–3		2–1	3–1	2–0	3–1	0–0	1–0	1–1	1–1	4–0	2–4	3–0	3–0	4–1	2–2	0–0	2–0	1–1
Cannes	0–1	1–0	1–1		2–0	3–0	0–0	5–2	2–1	3–0	2–1	1–2	1–1	2–1	0–2	1–3	0–2	3–0	2–0	0–3
Gueugnon	0–0	1–0	2–2	1–1		2–2	0–1	0–1	3–1	0–0	0–0	0–0	2–2	0–2	0–1	1–0	1–3	1–0	1–0	0–1
Guingamp	1–1	1–0	1–0	2–0	0–0		2–2	1–0	0–1	1–0	2–0	0–0	0–0	0–0	3–1	0–0	0–0	0–0	3–0	3–0
Le Havre	0–4	1–0	1–0	0–0	0–2	1–0		1–1	4–1	2–1	1–0	0–0	2–1	2–2	0–1	0–0	1–1	0–0	2–2	2–0
Lens	0–0	3–1	0–0	1–1	2–0	0–1	2–0		1–1	2–2	1–0	2–0	2–1	2–1	2–1	0–0	3–1	1–0	3–0	0–0
Lille	0–4	0–2	0–2	0–2	2–0	0–3	2–0	1–3		2–1	0–0	0–0	0–0	1–1	0–0	1–0	0–0	0–0	1–1	2–0
Lyon	0–1	1–1	1–0	1–0	0–0	1–1	3–2	0–0	1–1		5–1	1–1	3–3	3–2	1–1	1–0	0–0	2–2	2–1	1–1
Martigues	1–2	3–1	3–1	2–1	3–0	2–1	0–1	0–1	1–0	1–2		0–1	0–4	0–1	0–4	0–0	2–4	1–2	1–1	2–0
Metz	3–1	2–0	2–0	0–0	1–2	3–0	2–1	2–0	2–0	0–1	2–0		0–3	1–0	0–0	4–0	0–3	0–0	1–2	3–2
Monaco	2–2	0–0	2–0	1–0	0–0	1–0	2–1	1–1	2–1	0–2	0–1	0–1		3–1	4–1	1–0	1–0	3–1	2–0	5–1
Montpellier	3–1	4–3	3–0	3–1	2–2	2–1	2–0	0–0	0–0	2–1	2–0	1–2	0–0		1–0	0–1	1–0	3–1	1–0	2–2
Nantes	1–0	3–1	2–0	2–0	1–0	0–0	1–1	1–1	1–2	0–0	3–0	1–0	2–2	1–0		1–0	1–2	2–2	2–2	2–0
Nice	1–3	3–1	1–0	1–2	3–1	2–1	1–2	1–1	2–1	1–0	1–0	0–1	1–2	1–2	1–0		1–2	0–0	2–0	2–2
Paris SG	3–1	5–1	3–0	2–1	1–1	1–1	2–0	1–0	0–1	2–0	0–0	2–3	2–1	2–3	5–0	3–2		1–1	4–0	2–0
Rennes	2–1	2–0	4–3	3–2	2–1	3–0	1–0	2–1	3–1	1–0	1–3	0–0	2–3	1–1	2–2	1–0	0–1		3–0	0–0
Saint-Étienne	0–5	3–0	2–0	2–2	2–0	4–0	1–1	1–1	1–1	1–1	2–2	1–1	2–4	0–2	0–0	1–1	1–1	0–0		2–0
Strasbourg	1–0	4–3	3–0	1–0	0–0	0–0	3–0	1–2	2–0	2–2	2–0	1–2	2–0	1–0	1–1	1–1	1–0	3–1	3–1	

Source: Ligue 1
Legend: Blue = home team win; Yellow = draw; Red = away team win.

== Top goalscorers ==
Rank	Player	Club	Goals
1	(Brazil) Sonny Anderson	Monaco	21
2	(Federal Republic of Yugoslavia) Anto Drobnjak	Bastia	20
3	(France) Florian Maurice	Lyon	18
4	(Panama) Julio César Dely Valdes	Paris Saint-Germain	15
4	(Chad) Japhet N'Doram	Nantes	15
4	(France) Sylvain Wiltord	Rennes	15
7	(Brazil) Raí	Paris Saint-Germain	14
8	(France) Youri Djorkaeff	Paris Saint-Germain	13
8	(France) Corentin Martins	Auxerre	13
10	(Liberia) James Debbah	Nice	12
10	(France) Christophe Horlaville	Cannes	12
10	(France) Lilian Laslandes	Auxerre	12

== Attendances ==
#	Club	Average
1	PSG	37,353
2	Lens	25,492
3	Nantes	24,475
4	Olympique lyonnais	22,251
5	Metz	16,003
6	Strasbourg	15,334
7	Girondins	14,764
8	Saint-Étienne	13,746
9	Stade rennais	13,031
10	Guingamp	11,496
11	AJA	11,015
12	MHSC	9,929
13	Le Havre	9,590
14	LOSC	8,676
15	Gueugnon	6,540
16	Monaco	6,308
17	Nice	5,429
18	Cannes	4,839
19	Bastia	4,816
20	Martigues	3,520
