= Franck Dumas =

French footballer (born 1968)

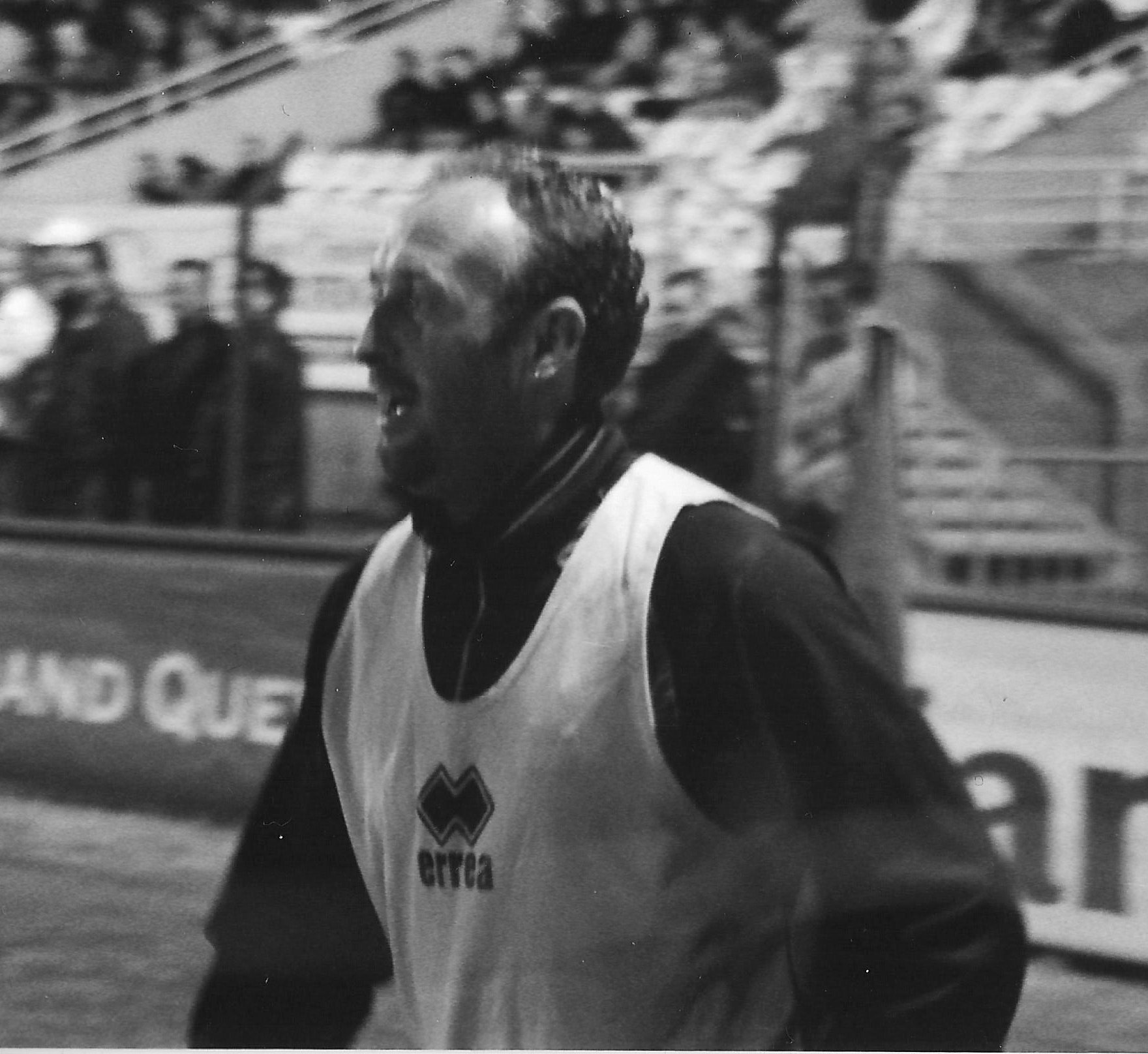
- Dumas in 2004

Personal information
- Date of birth: 9 January 1968 (age 58)
- Place of birth: Bayeux, Calvados, France
- Height: 1.80 m (5 ft 11 in)
- Position: Centre-back

Youth career
- INF Vichy
- ASPTT Caen

Senior career*
Years	Team	Apps	(Gls)
1987–1992	Caen	180	(11)
1992–1999	Monaco	222	(2)
1999–2000	Newcastle United	6	(0)
2000	Marseille	12	(0)
2000–2001	Lens	25	(0)
2001–2004	Caen	66	(0)
Total		511	(13)

Managerial career
- 2004–2005: Caen (sporting director)
- 2005–2012: Caen
- 2013–2014: Arles-Avignon
- 2014: Arles-Avignon (sporting director)
- 2014: MAS Fez
- 2017–2018: Equatorial Guinea
- 2018–2019: JS Kabylie
- 2019–2020: CA Bordj Bou Arréridj
- 2020–2021: CR Belouizdad
- 2021–2022: TP Mazembe
- 2023–2024: ES Sétif
- * Club domestic league appearances and goals

Franck Dumas (born 9 January 1968) is a French football coach and former player and a current manager. He played as a defender.

== Early life and playing career ==
Dumas was born in Bayeux, Calvados. He started his career at Caen and played there for five seasons before moving to Monaco. Dumas played in Jean Tigana's talented Monaco side which famously put Manchester United out of the Champions League in 1998 on away goals after a 1–1 draw at Old Trafford. He was also a key part of the side that won the 1996–97 Ligue 1 title.

Dumas joined Newcastle United in England in July 1999, before moving back to France to join Marseille in January 2000.

== Managerial career ==
Dumas later returned to Caen where he continued playing until his retirement in 2004, and where he would later manage.

In August 2014, Dumas was appointed as manager of Moroccan Botola side MAS Fez, on a one-year contract.

Dumas became manager of Democratic Republic of Congo club TP Mazembe in summer 2021. In October 2022 he was fired after the club lost to Ugandan side Vipers SC in CAF Champions League qualification thereby missing out on the competition's group stage.

On 13 September 2023, he was appointed as manager ao Algerian club ES Sétif. On 9 February 2024, he left ES Sétif.

== Tax evasion ==
In January 2017, Dumas was sentenced in first instance to three years of jail including ten months suspended by the French Tribunal of Caen for tax evasion, after a complaint from the French taxation authority to which he owed €557,496. The sentence was suspended after the judge heard Dumas' plea for mitigation which cited a gambling addiction and an "impossibly difficult" business situation.

In January 2023, The Court of Appeal sentenced Dumas to two years in prison, one of which was suspended, for tax fraud. It stated he had not paid his debt for nearly ten years. At the time, €300,000 had been recovered but "never voluntarily" and he was still owing €139,579 excluding penalties.
