= Marama Vahirua =

Tahitian footballer (born 1980)

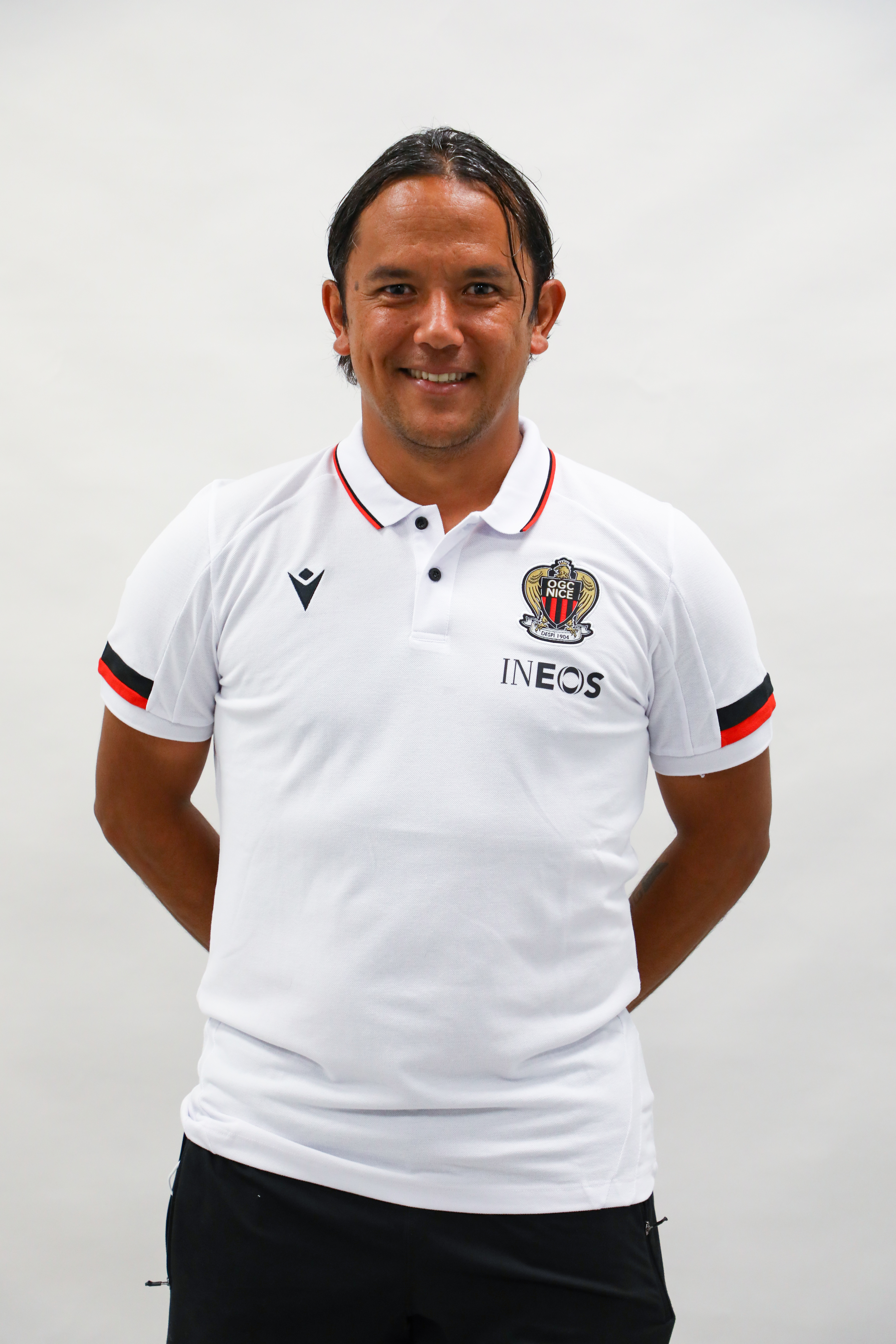
- Vahirua in 2021

Personal information
- Full name: Marama Kevin Vahirua
- Date of birth: 12 May 1980 (age 46)
- Place of birth: Pape'ete, Tahiti
- Height: 1.72 m (5 ft 8 in)
- Position: Striker

Youth career
- 1996–1997: Pirae
- 1997–1998: Nantes

Senior career*
Years	Team	Apps	(Gls)
1998–2004	Nantes	111	(28)
2004–2007	Nice	99	(19)
2007–2010	Lorient	86	(19)
2010–2013	Nancy	25	(5)
2011–2012	→ Monaco (loan)	12	(2)
2012–2013	→ Panthrakikos (loan)	26	(3)
2013–2016	Pirae		
2016–2017	Temanava		
2017–2018	A.S. Dragon		
Total		359	(76)

International career
2001–2002	France U21	6	(2)
2013–2018	Tahiti	5	(0)
- * Club domestic league appearances and goals

Marama Vahirua (born 12 May 1980) is a Tahitian former professional footballer who played as a striker. He spent most of his career in France before finishing his professional career in Greece with Panthrakikos F.C. In July 2018, he became president of Tahitian club A.S. Dragon. Between 2013 and 2014, he was the technical director of the Tahitian Football Federation.

== Club career ==
Vahirua started his career at the famed youth academy of Nantes, winning several honors including a Ligue 1 championship. Vahirua became known for being a "super sub" in the 2000–01 championship season as he often scored goals coming on as a substitute. His goal celebration was to mimic kayaking, a tribute to his Tahitian roots. He scored a goal in the 2001–02 Champions League when Nantes played against PSV Eindhoven.

Vahirua then went to Nice in August 2004, where he enjoyed two spectacular seasons, being reconverted to attacking midfielder in the process. After falling out with coach Frédéric Antonetti, he would leave the club in the Summer of 2007, joining fellow Ligue 1 side Lorient. The striker of Lorient announced on 12 May 2010 that he would play the following season with Nancy, and signed a three-year deal. On 11 August 2011, he joined Ligue 2 side Monaco on loan until the end of the 2011–12 season.

On 12 October 2013, he had signed with his hometown club A.S. Pirae.

In 2016, he joined Temanava. In May 2017 he scored in the semi-final of the Tahiti Cup against A.S. Dragon but his team lost after penalties.

In summer 2017, he transferred to A.S. Dragon where he would play in the OFC Champions League in March 2018.

In September 2018, he retired as a player.

== International career ==
Vahirua is a former France under-21 international, being given his chance by former senior team coach Raymond Domenech.

After winning 2012 OFC Nations Cup, Tahiti coach Eddy Etaeta called Vahirua up for 2014 FIFA World Cup qualification matches against Solomon Islands and New Caledonia in September 2012 and for the 2013 Confederations Cup in Brazil. Vahirua was the only full-time footballer in the mostly semi-professional squad, as well as the only one to play outside Tahiti.

He earned his first full cap for Tahiti on 17 June 2013 against Nigeria in a 6–1 losing effort at the Confederations Cup. He played the first 70 minutes of the game, setting up Tahiti's first goal of the tournament with a corner. After the tournament, Vahirua announced his retirement from the professional game, considering that he was leaving at the pinnacle of his career.

On 20 March 2018, Vahirua returned for Tahiti, playing in a 0–0 draw in a friendly against New Caledonia.

== Non-playing career ==
In July 2018, Vahirua became president of Tahitian club A.S. Dragon, whom he last played for.

== Personal life ==
His cousin, Pascal Vahirua, is a former French international.

After his last professional contract, at Panthrakikos in 2013, Vahirua suffered from depression for two years.

== Career statistics ==
=== International ===
Appearances and goals by national team and year
National team	Year	Apps	Goals
Tahiti	2013	3	0
Tahiti	2014	0	0
Tahiti	2015	0	0
Tahiti	2016	0	0
Tahiti	2017	0	0
Tahiti	2018	2	0
Total		5	0

== Honours ==
Nantes

- Division 1: 2000–01
- Coupe de France: 1998–99, 1999–2000

Pirae

- Super Ligue Mana: 2013–14

Individual

- Oceania Footballer of the Year: 2005
