= Marc Delaroche =

French footballer (born 1971)

Personal information
- Date of birth: 18 April 1971 (age 55)
- Place of birth: Creil
- Height: 1.85 m (6 ft 1 in)
- Position: Goalkeeper

Senior career*
Years	Team	Apps	(Gls)
1989–1992	AS Monaco II		
1991–1996	AS Monaco		
1996–1997	SM Caen		
1998–1999	Girondins Bordeaux		
1999–2002	Nîmes Olympique		
- * Club domestic league appearances and goals

Marc Delaroche (born 18 April 1971) is a retired French football goalkeeper.
