= Bruno Irles =

French footballer and manager (born 1975)

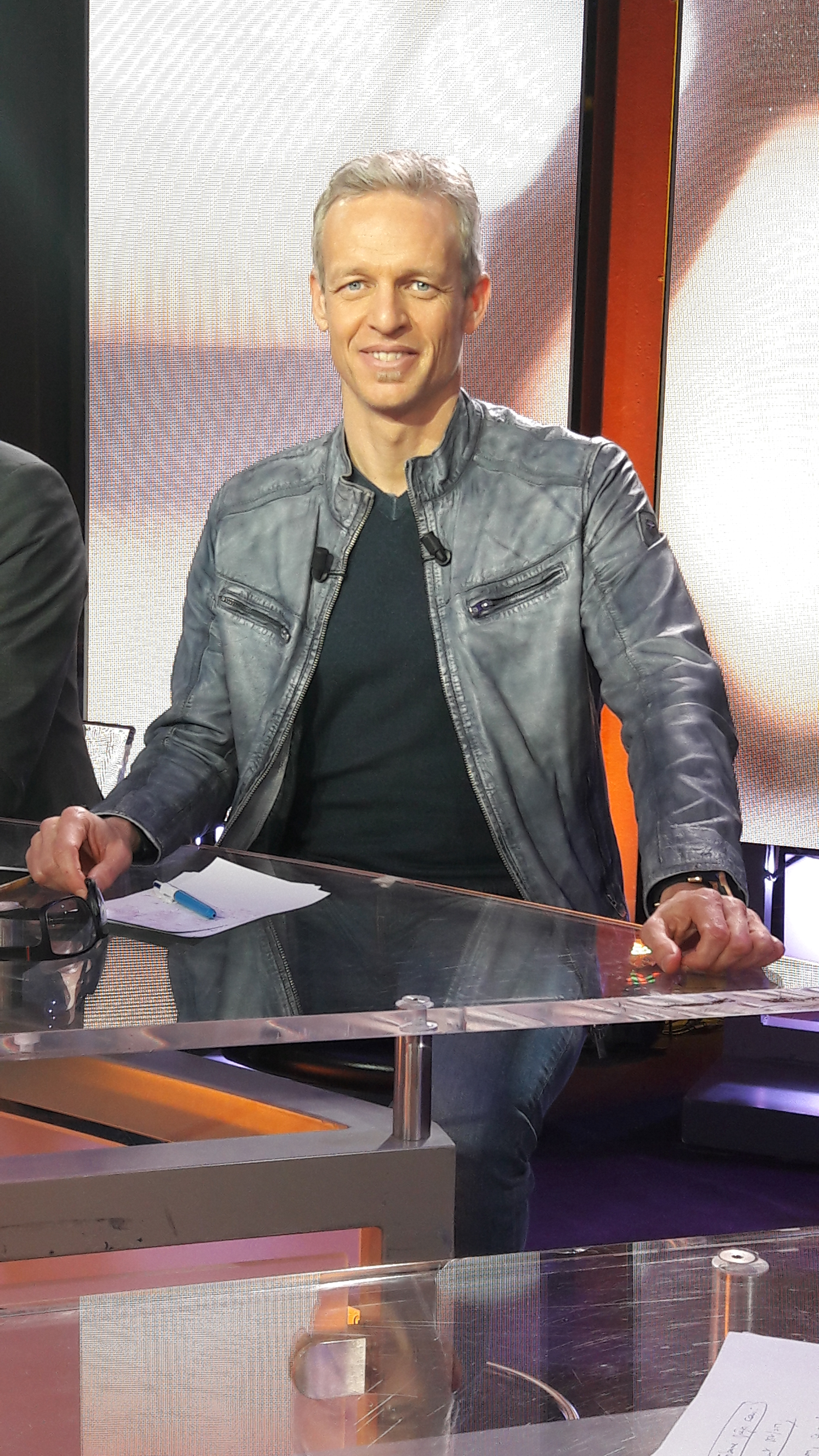
- Irles in 2018

Personal information
- Full name: Bruno Gilles Irles
- Date of birth: 16 August 1975 (age 51)
- Place of birth: Rochefort, Charente-Maritime, France
- Height: 1.85 m (6 ft 1 in)
- Position: Defender

Youth career
- –1994: Monaco

Senior career*
Years	Team	Apps	(Gls)
1994–2002	Monaco	57	(0)

International career
1994	France U18	4	(0)
1996–1997	France U21	6	(0)

Managerial career
- 2012–2014: Monaco B
- 2016: Sheriff Tiraspol
- 2018–2020: Pau
- 2020–2022: Quevilly-Rouen
- 2022: Troyes
- 2024: RWDM
- 2024–2026: Bordeaux
- * Club domestic league appearances and goals

Bruno Gilles Irles (born 16 August 1975) is a French professional football manager and former player who was most recently manager of Championnat National 1 club Bordeaux. He is also a pundit on French television.

== Early life and playing career ==
Bruno Gilles Irles was born on 16 August 1975 in Rochefort, Charente-Maritime. He played his senior career with Monaco in Ligue 1, where he made 83 appearances without scoring.

== Coaching career ==
=== Monaco ===
Irles began his coaching career at the AS Monaco training centre, first scouting the opponents for Didier Deschamps' staff during their run to the 2004 UEFA Champions League Final.

For six years from 2005, he coached the club's Under-17 team, taking reins of the Monegasque reserve team in CFA 3 as well as management of the training centre in September 2011.

=== AC Arles-Avignon ===
In 2014, as part of a partnership initiated between AS Monaco and AC Arles-Avignon, Irles became the assistant coach of the Ligue 2 team on 6 October that year.

=== Sheriff Tiraspol ===
After obtaining his professional coaching license in 2016, he became head coach at Sheriff Tiraspol in Moldova. He won the Moldovan Super Cup in August 2016 and played in the second qualifying round of the UEFA Champions League. After an away defeat at the end of September 2016, he was surprisingly relieved of his duties while his team was leading the Moldovan championship with six victories in eight matches and with the most goals scored.

=== TV pundit (2017-2022) ===
Without a club, Irles became a pundit on Canal+ in France in January 2017, starting on the Infosport+ programme, before joining the Late Football Club team when it launched in August 2017.

He continued to work as a pundit while returning to coaching with lower division clubs Pau FC and Quevilly-Rouen, until joining ESTAC Troyes in January 2022.

=== RWDM ===
After being out of football for another year, Irles was brought in to do a fire-fighting role at relegation-threatened Belgian Pro League club RWDM of Brussels. Irles was appointed on 16 February 2024, following the sacking of Caçapa with the club second-from-bottom in the table.

=== Bordeaux ===
On 28 August 2024, Irles was appointed head coach of FC Girondins de Bordeaux in the Championnat National 2.
