= 1996–97 French Division 1 =

59th season of French Division 1

Division 1
- Season: 1996–97
- Dates: 9 August 1996 – 24 May 1997
- Champions: Monaco (6th title)
- Relegated: Caen; Nancy; Lille; Nice
- Matches: 380
- Goals: 884 (2.33 per match)
- Best player: Sonny Anderson
- Top goalscorer: Stéphane Guivarc'h (22)

The 1996–97 Division 1 season was the 59th since its establishment. AS Monaco won the French Association Football League with 79 points. Four teams were relegated to Second division and only two were promoted because in 1997–1998, only 18 would participate the championship.

== Participating teams ==
- Auxerre
- Bastia
- Bordeaux
- SM Caen
- AS Cannes
- EA Guingamp
- Le Havre AC
- RC Lens
- Lille OSC
- Olympique Lyonnais
- Olympique de Marseille
- FC Metz
- AS Monaco
- Montpellier HSC
- AS Nancy
- FC Nantes Atlantique
- OGC Nice
- Paris Saint-Germain FC
- Stade Rennais FC
- RC Strasbourg
Location of teams in 1996–97 Division 1

== League table ==
Pos	Team	Pld	W	D	L	GF	GA	GD	Pts	Qualification or relegation
1	Monaco (C)	38	23	10	5	69	30	+39	79	Qualification to Champions League group stage
2	Paris Saint-Germain	38	18	13	7	57	31	+26	67	Qualification to Champions League second qualifying round
3	Nantes	38	16	16	6	61	32	+29	64	Qualification to UEFA Cup first round
4	Bordeaux	38	16	15	7	59	42	+17	63	Qualification to UEFA Cup first round
5	Metz	38	17	11	10	40	30	+10	62	Qualification to UEFA Cup first round
6	Auxerre	38	17	10	11	49	32	+17	61	Qualification to Intertoto Cup group stage
7	Bastia	38	17	10	11	54	47	+7	61	Qualification to Intertoto Cup group stage
8	Lyon	38	16	12	10	59	50	+9	60	Qualification to Intertoto Cup group stage
9	Strasbourg	38	19	3	16	52	49	+3	60	Qualification to UEFA Cup first round (Note: Strasbourg was qualified for the 1997–98 UEFA Cup as winners of the 1996–97 Coupe de la Ligue.)
10	Montpellier	38	12	15	11	40	40	0	51	Qualification to Intertoto Cup group stage
11	Marseille	38	12	13	13	43	48	−5	49	
12	Guingamp	38	11	13	14	32	36	−4	46	
13	Lens	38	12	9	17	40	52	−12	45	
14	Le Havre	38	10	13	15	34	43	−9	43	
15	Cannes	38	9	14	15	25	41	−16	41	
16	Rennes	38	10	10	18	40	58	−18	40	
17	Caen (R)	38	7	16	15	35	46	−11	37	Relegation to Division 2
18	Nancy (R)	38	9	10	19	33	51	−18	37	Relegation to Division 2
19	Lille (R)	38	8	11	19	32	58	−26	35	Relegation to Division 2
20	Nice (R)	38	5	8	25	30	68	−38	23	Cup Winners' Cup first round and relegation to Division 2 (Note: Nice qualified for the 1997–98 UEFA Cup Winners' Cup as winners of the 1996–97 Coupe de France.)

Source: Ligue 1
Rules for classification: 1) points; 2) goal difference; 3) number of goals scored.
(C) Champions; (R) Relegated
Notes:

Promoted from Ligue 2, who will play in Division 1 season 1997/1998

- LB Châteauroux : champion of Ligue 2
- Toulouse FC : runners-up

== Results ==
Home \ Away	AUX	BAS	BOR	CAE	CAN	GUI	LHA	RCL	LIL	OL	OM	MET	ASM	MHS	NAL	FCN	NIC	PSG	REN	RCS
Auxerre		1–2	2–1	2–0	3–1	1–0	2–0	1–0	2–0	7–0	0–0	2–3	2–0	0–2	1–0	2–2	3–1	2–1	4–1	0–1
Bastia	2–1		3–1	4–2	1–0	1–0	1–2	0–1	0–0	3–1	2–0	2–1	0–0	2–2	2–0	0–0	1–0	1–1	2–0	3–1
Bordeaux	0–0	3–1		3–1	1–0	0–0	1–0	2–1	3–0	2–2	4–0	1–0	2–1	3–1	0–1	0–0	4–1	5–3	2–0	1–2
Caen	2–3	2–2	0–0		3–0	0–1	4–0	0–2	1–0	1–1	1–0	0–0	0–1	0–1	1–1	0–0	1–2	1–3	0–0	3–0
Cannes	1–1	1–1	1–1	2–0		1–0	2–0	0–0	0–1	0–1	0–0	0–0	0–2	1–0	0–1	1–1	1–1	0–1	1–0	2–2
Guingamp	0–0	2–1	2–2	1–1	0–1		2–2	1–0	1–0	1–0	3–1	0–1	2–1	0–0	0–1	0–0	0–1	2–2	1–0	2–1
Le Havre	0–2	0–1	1–2	1–1	0–0	0–1		0–0	0–0	4–1	1–1	0–0	1–2	0–0	1–3	3–1	1–0	1–0	1–1	2–0
Lens	2–1	1–1	3–4	0–0	0–0	2–1	0–1		1–0	0–1	2–0	2–2	1–3	3–2	3–1	0–4	3–2	1–2	2–0	1–2
Lille	0–1	1–2	0–0	1–0	1–2	1–1	2–2	2–1		1–1	1–1	1–0	1–4	0–4	2–0	3–3	3–2	0–1	3–1	2–4
Lyon	2–0	4–2	2–2	3–0	3–1	2–1	2–1	0–0	0–0		8–0	0–0	3–3	1–1	2–0	0–1	3–1	1–1	2–0	2–0
Marseille	3–0	1–0	0–0	0–1	3–1	2–1	0–0	2–1	5–1	3–1		1–2	3–1	2–2	4–1	0–1	1–0	1–0	3–1	0–1
Metz	1–0	1–0	1–1	2–2	0–0	2–0	1–2	2–0	1–0	0–1	1–1		2–0	1–1	1–0	0–1	1–0	0–1	2–0	3–1
Monaco	0–0	3–1	3–1	2–2	1–0	0–0	3–0	5–1	2–0	0–0	1–1	1–1		1–1	2–0	2–1	4–1	2–0	3–1	2–0
Montpellier	0–0	3–1	2–0	0–0	0–1	1–0	2–1	1–0	0–1	2–1	2–0	1–0	0–1		1–1	2–2	2–1	0–3	0–0	1–4
Nancy	0–0	2–2	1–1	1–2	1–2	2–0	0–1	1–1	2–2	2–3	0–0	2–3	1–3	0–0		1–3	1–0	0–0	1–0	2–0
Nantes	0–0	3–0	3–1	1–1	5–1	1–1	1–1	0–1	1–0	2–2	1–1	0–1	1–3	3–0	2–0		7–0	0–0	3–3	3–0
Nice	0–1	1–1	0–1	1–1	0–0	1–2	0–3	1–2	1–1	0–1	0–0	3–0	0–2	1–1	1–0	1–2		0–1	3–1	1–1
Paris SG	1–1	3–0	2–2	2–0	1–1	1–1	2–0	4–0	3–1	3–1	0–0	2–0	0–0	1–1	1–2	1–0	5–0		1–1	2–1
Rennes	1–0	1–3	1–1	1–1	3–0	1–1	1–1	2–2	2–0	2–1	4–2	1–3	0–3	2–0	1–0	0–1	3–1	2–1		2–0
Strasbourg	2–1	1–3	1–1	2–0	2–0	2–1	1–0	1–0	3–0	3–0	2–1	0–1	0–2	2–1	3–1	0–1	3–1	0–1	3–0	

Source: Ligue 1
Legend: Blue = home team win; Yellow = draw; Red = away team win.

== Top goalscorers ==
Rank	Player	Club	Goals
1	(France) Stéphane Guivarc'h	Rennes	22
2	(Chad) Japhet N'Doram	Nantes	21
3	(Brazil) Sonny Anderson	Monaco	19
3	(France) Alain Caveglia	Lyon	19
3	(France) David Zitelli	Strasbourg	19
6	(Federal Republic of Yugoslavia) Anto Drobnjak	Bastia	18
7	(France) Jean-Pierre Papin	Bordeaux	16
7	(France) Ludovic Giuly	Lyon	16
9	(France) Xavier Gravelaine	Marseille	15
9	(France) Patrice Loko	Paris Saint-Germain	15

== Awards ==
=== Individual awards ===
Award	Winner	Club
Ligue 1 Player of the Year	(Brazil) Sonny Anderson	Monaco
Ligue 1 Young Player of the Year	(France) Thierry Henry	Monaco
Ligue 1 Manager of the Year	(France) Jean Tigana	Monaco

Team of the Year
Goalkeeper	(France) Fabien Barthez (Monaco)			
Defenders	(France) Patrick Blondeau (Monaco)	(France) Franck Silvestre (Auxerre)	(France) Franck Dumas (Monaco)	(France) Emmanuel Petit (Monaco)
Midfielders	(France) Ibrahim Ba (Bordeaux)	(France) Sylvain Legwinski (Monaco)	(Algeria) Ali Benarbia (Monaco)	(Chad) Japhet N'Doram (Nantes)
Forwards	(Brazil) Sonny Anderson (Monaco)	(France) David Zitelli (Strasbourg)		

== Attendances ==
No.	Club	Average attendance	Change
1	Paris Saint-Germain FC	35,582	-4.7%
2	RC Lens	22,977	-9.9%
3	FC Nantes	22,372	-8.6%
4	Olympique lyonnais	21,624	-2.8%
5	Girondins de Bordeaux	20,249	37.2%
6	Olympique de Marseille	17,862	-0.5%
7	RC Strasbourg	17,341	13.1%
8	SM Caen	15,893	24.7%
9	FC Metz	14,701	-8.1%
10	Stade rennais	13,177	1.1%
11	Le Havre AC	10,586	10.4%
12	AJ auxerroise	10,503	-4.6%
13	LOSC	10,347	19.3%
14	MHSC	10,125	2.0%
15	AS Nancy	9,239	29.7%
16	EA Guingamp	8,434	-26.6%
17	AS Saint-Étienne	8,061	-41.4%
18	AS Monaco	7,103	12.6%
19	SC Bastia	5,415	12.4%
20	OGC Nice	5,024	-7.5%
