= 1999–2000 AS Monaco FC season =

AS Monaco
1999–2000 season
- Manager: Claude Puel
- Stadium: Stade Louis II
- Ligue 1: 1st
- Coupe de France: Semi-final
- Coupe de la Ligue: Round of 16
- UEFA Cup: Fourth round
- Top goalscorer: League: David Trezeguet (22); All: Marco Simone (28)
Home colours	Away colours

During the 1999–2000 French football season, AS Monaco FC competed in the French Ligue 1, winning the title by seven points over nearest challengers Paris Saint-Germain.

== Squad ==
Squad at end of season

Note: Flags indicate national team as defined under FIFA eligibility rules; some limited exceptions apply. Players may hold more than one non-FIFA nationality.

No.	Pos.	Nation	Player
1	GK	FRA	Fabien Barthez
2	DF	CHI	Pablo Contreras
3	DF	FRA	Christophe Pignol
4	DF	MEX	Rafael Márquez
5	DF	FRA	Philippe Christanval
6	DF	FRA	Martin Djetou (Note: Djetou was born in Brogohlo, Ivory Coast.)
7	MF	FRA	Sabri Lamouchi
8	MF	FRA	Ludovic Giuly
9	FW	FRA	David Trezeguet
10	MF	ARG	Marcelo Gallardo
11	FW	ITA	Marco Simone
12	FW	HAI	Wagneau Eloi
14	MF	FRA	Fabien Lefèvre
16	GK	FRA	Jean-Marie Aubry

No.	Pos.	Nation	Player
17	DF	BEL	Philippe Léonard
18	MF	POR	Costinha
19	DF	FRA	Willy Sagnol
20	FW	CRO	Dado Pršo
21	MF	SWE	Pontus Farnerud
22	MF	SEN	Moussa N'Diaye
23	DF	FRA	Bruno Irles
25	MF	SEN	Salif Diao
27	DF	FRA	Julien Rodriguez
28	DF	NOR	John Arne Riise
29	DF	FRA	David Di Tommaso
30	GK	SEN	Tony Sylva
31	MF	FRA	Grégory Lacombe
40	GK	FRA	Patrice Luzi

== Transfers ==
In: Note: Flags indicate national team as defined under FIFA eligibility rules; some limited exceptions apply. Players may hold more than one non-FIFA nationality.

No.	Pos.	Nation	Player
2	DF	CHI	Pablo Contreras (from (Chile) Colo-Colo)
4	DF	MEX	Rafael Márquez (from (Mexico) Atlas)
10	MF	ARG	Marcelo Gallardo (from (Argentina) River Plate)
11	FW	ITA	Marco Simone (from (France) Paris Saint-Germain)
12	FW	HAI	Wagneau Eloi (from (France) Lens)
20	FW	CRO	Dado Pršo (loan return from (France) Ajaccio)

Out: Note: Flags indicate national team as defined under FIFA eligibility rules; some limited exceptions apply. Players may hold more than one non-FIFA nationality.

No.	Pos.	Nation	Player
2	DF	FRA	Lilian Martin (to (France) Marseille)
3	DF	FRA	Christophe Pignol (to (France) Lille)
5	DF	FRA	Franck Dumas (to (England) Newcastle United)
10	MF	CHA	Japhet N'Doram (Retired)
11	FW	CRO	Robert Špehar (to (Italy) Hellas Verona)
14	MF	FRA	Fabien Lefèvre
15	MF	FRA	Sylvain Legwinski (to (France) Bordeaux)
20	MF	FRA	Franck Gava (to (France) Rennes)
21	DF	BIH	Muhamed Konjić (to (England) Coventry City)
24	FW	NGA	Victor Ikpeba (to (Germany) Borussia Dortmund)
32	MF	FRA	Uliano Courville
—	DF	MLI	Sékou Berthé (to (France) Tours)

== Competitions ==
=== Division 1 ===
==== League table ====
Pos	Team	Pld	W	D	L	GF	GA	GD	Pts	Qualification or relegation
1	Monaco (C)	34	20	5	9	69	38	+31	65	Qualification to Champions League first group stage
2	Paris Saint-Germain	34	16	10	8	54	40	+14	58	Qualification to Champions League first group stage
3	Lyon	34	16	8	10	45	42	+3	56	Qualification to Champions League third qualifying round
4	Bordeaux	34	15	9	10	52	40	+12	54	Qualification to UEFA Cup first round
5	Lens	34	14	7	13	42	41	+1	49	Qualification to Intertoto Cup third round

Source: Ligue 1
Rules for classification: 1) points; 2) goal difference; 3) number of goals scored.
(C) Champions

==== Results summary ====
Overall								Home						Away					
Pld	W	D	L	GF	GA	GD	Pts	W	D	L	GF	GA	GD	W	D	L	GF	GA	GD
34	20	5	9	69	38	+31	65	13	4	0	37	11	+26	7	1	9	32	27	+5

Last updated: 26 February 2015.
Source: Competitive matches

==== Results by round ====
Round	1	2	3	4	5	6	7	8	9	10	11	12	13	14	15	16	17	18	19	20	21	22	23	24	25	26	27	28	29	30	31	32	33	34
Ground	H	A	H	A	H	A	H	A	H	A	H	H	A	H	A	H	A	H	A	H	A	H	A	H	A	H	A	A	H	A	H	A	H	A
Result	D	L	W	W	W	L	D	W	W	L	W	W	W	D	W	W	W	W	L	W	W	W	D	W	L	W	L	W	W	L	D	L	W	L
Position	8	13	8	3	1	4	6	2	1	3	3	5	3	3	2	2	1	1	1	1	1	1	1	1	1	1	1	1	1	1	1	1	1	1

Source: Ligue 1
A = Away; H = Home; W = Win; D = Draw; L = Loss

==== Matches ====
30 July 1999 1	Monaco	2–2	Saint-Étienne	Fontvieille
20:45 CEST (UTC+2)	Simone 11'; Trezeguet 29'; Contreras (yellow card) 36'; Christanval (yellow card) 82'; Legwinski (yellow card) 87'; Costinha (yellow card) 90'	Report	Mettomo (yellow card) 20'; Pédron 21'; Aloísio 52'; Wallemme (yellow card) 78'	Stadium: Stade Louis II; Attendance: 14,668; Referee: Bruno Derrien

6 August 1999 2	Lens	1–0	Monaco	Lens
20:00 CEST (UTC+2)	Moreira 40'	Report	Lamouchi (yellow card) 32'	Stadium: Stade Bollaert-Delelis; Attendance: 40,468; Referee: Pierre Renaudin

14 August 1999 3	Monaco	4–0	Bastia	Fontvieille
20:00 CEST (UTC+2)	Márquez (yellow card) 25'; Trezeguet 40', 74', 78'; Costinha (yellow card) 42'; Giuly 87'	Report	Née (yellow card) 72'	Stadium: Stade Louis II; Attendance: 13,864; Referee: Gilles Cheron

20 August 1999 4	Montpellier	2–3	Monaco	Montpellier
20:00 CEST (UTC+2)	Loko (yellow card) 23'; Sorlin 28'; Fugier (yellow card) 33'; Barbosa (yellow card) 46'; Maoulida 75'	Report	Trezeguet (yellow card) 14' (goal) 51'; Christanval (yellow card) 47'; Simone 52', 82'; Gallardo (yellow card) 67'	Stadium: Stade de la Mosson; Attendance: 21,598; Referee: Philippe Kalt

29 August 1999 5	Monaco	3–0	Troyes	Fontvieille
19:00 CEST (UTC+2)	Trezeguet 31', 44'; Legwinski (yellow card) 40'; Márquez (yellow card) 70'; Simone 77'	Report	Berthé (yellow card) 47'; Rival (yellow card) 74'; Thomas (yellow card) 88'	Stadium: Stade Louis II; Attendance: 9,600; Referee: Alain Hamer

12 September 1999 6	Rennes	2–1	Monaco	Rennes
18:45 CEST (UTC+2)	Costinha 25' (o.g.); Diouf (yellow card) 42'; Nonda 66'; Grégoire (yellow card) 77'; Sommeil (yellow card) 89'	Report	Gallardo 24'; Léonard (yellow card) 35'; Lamouchi (yellow card) 43'; Trezeguet (yellow card) 44'; Márquez (yellow card) 57'	Stadium: Stade de la Route de Lorient; Attendance: 14,297; Referee: Jean-Claude Puyalt

19 September 1999 7	Monaco	2–2	Metz	Fontvieille
18:00 CEST (UTC+2)	N'Diaye 17'; Riise (yellow card) 42'; Léonard (yellow card) 52'; Trezeguet 66'	Report	Gaillot (yellow card) 7' (goal) 76'; Pierre (yellow card) 16'; Kastendeuch (yellow card) 49'; Jestrović (yellow card) 71'; Skachenko (yellow card) 83' (goal) 85'	Stadium: Stade Louis II; Attendance: 6,486; Referee: Hervé Piccirillo

25 September 1999 8	Paris Saint-Germain	0–3	Monaco	Paris
20:00 CEST (UTC+2)	Laspalles (yellow card) 60'; Lama (yellow card) 63'; Cissé (yellow card) 86'	Report	Léonard (yellow card) 25' (goal) 82'; Christanval (yellow card) 30'; Trezeguet 65' (yellow card) 89'; Giuly 90'	Stadium: Parc des Princes; Attendance: 43,899; Referee: Laurent Duhamel

3 October 1999 9	Monaco	1–0	Lyon	Fontvieille
18:45 CEST (UTC+2)	Gallardo 5' (yellow card) 89'; Léonard (yellow card) 58'; Lamouchi (yellow card) 60'; Giuly (yellow card) 65'; Pršo (yellow card) 87'	Report	Fournier (yellow card) 32'; Carteron (yellow card) 34'; Laville (yellow card) 42'; Violeau (yellow card) 75'	Stadium: Stade Louis II; Attendance: 13,086; Referee: Pascal Garibian

13 October 1999 10	Girondins de Bordeaux	3–2	Monaco	Bordeaux
20:00 CEST (UTC+2)	Laslandes 18', 29'; Pavon (yellow card) 38'; Bonnissel (yellow card) 42'; Wiltord 75'; Diabaté (yellow card) 88'	Report	Sagnol (yellow card) 26'; Simone 27', 86' (yellow card) 40'; Barthez (yellow card) 44'	Stadium: Stade Chaban-Delmas; Attendance: 31,400; Referee: Stéphane Bré

16 October 1999 11	Monaco	3–0	RC Strasbourg	Fontvieille
20:00 CEST (UTC+2)	Simone 28', 72'; Contreras (yellow card) 59' (yellow-red card) 74'; Lamouchi 90'	Report	Zitelli (yellow card) 54'; Diop (yellow card) 66'; Bertin (yellow card) 77'	Stadium: Stade Louis II; Attendance: 6,173; Referee: Laurent Duhamel

23 October 1999 12	Monaco	Postponed	AJ Auxerre	Fontvieille
CEST (UTC+2)		[ Report]		Stadium: Stade Louis II

29 October 1999 13	Nantes	0–3	Monaco	Nantes
20:45 CEST (UTC+2)	Savinaud (yellow card) 43'	Report	Simone 9'; Gallardo (yellow card) 31'; Trezeguet 63' (yellow card) 73'; Léonard (yellow card) 70'; Giuly 87'; N'Diaye (yellow card) 87'	Stadium: Stade de la Beaujoire; Attendance: 28,980; Referee: Bruno Derrien

7 November 1999 14	Monaco	1–1	Marseille	Fontvieille
20:45 CET (UTC+1)	Márquez (yellow card) 11' (goal) 30'; Gallardo (yellow card) 24'; Sagnol (yellow card) 48'; Costinha (yellow card) 63'	Report	Luccin 24' (yellow card) 70'; Brando (yellow card) 25' (yellow-red card) 75'; Blondeau (yellow card) 29'; Fischer (yellow card) 47'	Stadium: Stade Louis II; Attendance: 14,529; Referee: Stéphane Bré

10 November 1999 15	AS Nancy	1–2	Monaco	Nancy
19:00 CET (UTC+1)	Lécluse (yellow card) 24'; Chiba (yellow card) 59'; Correa 69' (yellow card) 70' (yellow-red card) 89'	Report	Costinha (yellow card) 26' (goal) 87'; Simone 73'; Lamouchi (yellow card) 73'; N'Diaye (yellow card) 82'	Stadium: Stade Marcel Picot; Attendance: 10,136; Referee: Bertrand Layec

20 November 1999 16	Monaco	2–1	Sedan	Fontvieille
20:30 CET (UTC+1)	Márquez 11'; Lamouchi 31' (yellow card) 78'; Legwinski (yellow card) 68'; Costinha (yellow card) 90'; Léonard (yellow card) 90'	Report	Oliveira 21'; Di Rocco (yellow card) 74'	Stadium: Stade Louis II; Attendance: 5,902; Referee: Stéphane Moulin

27 November 1999 17	Havre AC	1–4	Monaco	Le Havre
20:00 CET (UTC+1)	Mamouni 25'; Diallo (yellow card) 68'; Mansouri (yellow card) 77'	Report	Simone 16', 75'; Costinha (yellow card) 40'; Lamouchi 45'; Contreras (yellow card) 60'; Márquez 76'	Stadium: Stade Océane; Attendance: 16,272; Referee: Pascal Garibian

1 December 1999 12	Monaco	2–0	AJ Auxerre	Fontvieille
20:30 CET (UTC+1)	Gallardo 26', 41' (yellow card) 50'; Djetou (yellow card) 59'	Report		Stadium: Stade Louis II; Attendance: 9,387; Referee: Éric Poulat

5 December 1999 18	Monaco	2–0	Lens	Fontvieille
18:45 CET (UTC+1)	Trezeguet 15', 41'	Report	Barul (yellow card) 11'; Coridon (yellow card) 49'	Stadium: Stade Louis II; Attendance: 9,352; Referee: Gilles Cheron

12 December 1999 19	SC Bastia	1–0	Monaco	Bastia
17:00 CET (UTC+1)	Świerczewski (yellow card) 30'; Née (yellow card) 73'; Camara 86'; Matingou (yellow card) 90'	Report	Costinha (yellow card) 40'; Contreras (yellow card) 72'; Giuly (yellow card) 88'	Stadium: Stade Armand Cesari; Attendance: 7,327; Referee: Bruno Derrien

18 December 1999 20	Monaco	1–0	Montpellier	Fontvieille
20:00 CET (UTC+1)	Simone 33'; Lamouchi (yellow card) 44'; Gallardo (yellow card) 50'; Sagnol (yellow card) 66'; Trezeguet (yellow card) 81'	Report	Silvestre (yellow card) 32'; Fugier (yellow card) 41'; Decroix (yellow card) 86'	Stadium: Stade Louis II; Attendance: 5,810; Referee: Bertrand Layec

12 January 2000 21	Troyes	1–4	Monaco	Troyes
20:00 CET (UTC+1)	Arpinon (yellow card) 22'; Ghazi (yellow card) 24'; Đukić (yellow card) 25'; Saïfi 80'	Report	Simone 5'; Gallardo 9', 70'; Giuly 11'; Barthez (yellow card) 85'	Stadium: Stade de l'Aube; Attendance: 14,829; Referee: Patrick Lhermitte

15 January 2000 22	Monaco	3–1	Rennes	Fontvieille
20:00 CET (UTC+1)	Trezeguet 9', 17'; Simone 42'; Sagnol (yellow card) 59'; Léonard (yellow card) 65'	Report	Le Roux (yellow card) 16' (goal) 51'; Sommeil (yellow card) 20'; Diouf (yellow card) 25' (yellow-red card) 53'	Stadium: Stade Louis II; Attendance: 5,998; Referee: Franck Glochon

25 January 2000 23	Metz	1–1	Monaco	Metz
20:45 CET (UTC+1)	Baticle 58'	Report	Simone 65'; Di Tommaso (yellow card) 67'	Stadium: Stade Saint-Symphorien; Attendance: 19,861; Referee: Bruno Ruffray

1 February 2000 24	Monaco	1–0	Paris Saint-Germain	Fontvieille
20:45 CET (UTC+1)	Trezeguet (yellow card) 18' (goal) 84'; Lamouchi (yellow card) 40'; Márquez (yellow card) 84'	Report	Robert (yellow card) 17' (yellow-red card) 44'; Algerino (yellow card) 64'; Cissé (yellow card) 80'; Rabésandratana (yellow card) 83'	Stadium: Stade Louis II; Attendance: 14,915; Referee: Damien Ledentu

6 February 2000 25	Lyon	2–1	Monaco	Lyon
20:45 CET (UTC+1)	Anderson 5' (red card) 52'; Sagnol 21' (o.g.); Vairelles (yellow card) 22'; Linarès (yellow card) 40'; Uras (yellow card) 42'; Laville (yellow card) 50'; Carteron (yellow card) 75'	Report	Trezeguet 38'; Djetou (yellow card) 44'; Gallardo (yellow card) 44'; Léonard (yellow card) 86'; Costinha (yellow card) 90'	Stadium: Stade de Gerland; Attendance: 38,478; Referee: Stéphane Bré

16 February 2000 26	Monaco	1–0	Girondins de Bordeaux	Fontvieille
20:00 CET (UTC+1)	Giuly (yellow card) 63'; Riise 83'	Report	Afanou (yellow card) 66'; Pavon (yellow card) 78'	Stadium: Stade Louis II; Attendance: 13,885; Referee: Laurent Duhamel

27 February 2000 27	RC Strasbourg	3–2	Monaco	Strasbourg
18:45 CET (UTC+1)	Echouafni 16'; Bertin 39'; Hemdani 62'; Ehret (yellow card) 63'; Njanka (yellow card) 75'	Report	Trezeguet 23', 30'; Contreras (yellow card) 63'; Djetou (yellow card) 88'; Barthez (yellow card) 90'	Stadium: Stade de la Meinau; Attendance: 31,330; Referee: Bruno Derrien

12 March 2000 28	AJ Auxerre	0–2	Monaco	Auxerre
20:45 CET (UTC+1)	Jay (yellow card) 33'	Report	Costinha (yellow card) 19'; Christanval (yellow card) 36'; Léonard 49'; Simone (yellow card) 50'; Gallardo 64'	Stadium: Stade de l'Abbé-Deschamps; Attendance: 15,385; Referee: Éric Poulat

26 March 2000 29	Monaco	2–0	Nantes	Fontvieille
20:45 CEST (UTC+2)	Pršo 22'; Giuly 25'; Christanval (yellow card) 44'	Report	Savinaud (yellow card) 87'	Stadium: Stade Louis II; Attendance: 9,914; Referee: Jean-Claude Puyalt

7 April 2000 30	Marseille	4–2	Monaco	Stade Vélodrome
20:45 CEST (UTC+2)	Martini (yellow card) 24'; Pouget 30' de la Peña (red card) 37'; Bakayoko 55', 78'; Blondeau (yellow card) 56'; Brando 90'	Report	Léonard (yellow card) 34' (yellow-red card) 44'; Gallardo (yellow card) 41' (yellow-red card) 45'; Trezeguet 60', 70'; Costinha (yellow card) 67'	Stadium: Marseille; Attendance: 55,895; Referee: Pierre Renaudin

15 April 2000 31	Monaco	2–2	AS Nancy	Fontvieille
20:00 CEST (UTC+2)	Simone 12'; Costinha (yellow card) 26'; Trezeguet (yellow card) 79'; Pršo (yellow card) 88' (goal) 90+2'	Report	Rambo 10'; Lefèvre 40'; Biancalani (yellow card) 41'; Ferreira (yellow card) 50'; Moustaïd (yellow card) 52' (yellow-red card) 55'; Méniri (yellow card) 60'	Stadium: Stade Louis II; Attendance: 11,875; Referee: Pascal Garibian

29 April 2000 32	Sedan	2–1	Monaco	Sedan
20:00 CEST (UTC+2)	Mionnet (yellow card) 6'; Sagnol 20' (o.g.); Deblock 53'; Huard (yellow card) 57'	Report	Léonard (yellow card) 69'; Simone (yellow card) 79' (goal) 82'	Stadium: Stade Louis Dugauguez; Attendance: 17,113; Referee: Patrick Lhermitte

4 May 2000 33	Monaco	5–2	Havre AC	Fontvieille
20:00 CEST (UTC+2)	Simone 19', 72'; Gallardo 48'; Trezeguet 77', 83'	Report	Beuzelin 70'; Čustović 78'	Stadium: Stade Louis II; Attendance: 8,953; Referee: Gilles Cheron

13 May 2000 34	Saint-Étienne	3–1	Monaco	Saint-Étienne
20:00 CEST (UTC+2)	Wallemme 12'; Christanval 20' (o.g.); Aloísio (yellow card) 31'; Sablé (yellow card) 37'; Guel 43'	Report	Simone 16' (yellow card) 19'; Costinha (yellow card) 44'; Lamouchi (yellow card) 64'	Stadium: Stade Geoffroy-Guichard; Attendance: 35,558; Referee: Bertrand Layec

=== Coupe de la Ligue ===
7 January 2000 Round of 32	Auxerre	0–0 (a.e.t.) (4–5 p)	Monaco	Auxerre
CET (UTC+1)	Jeunechamp (yellow card) 85'; Kapo (yellow card) 100'; Ciechelski (yellow card) 104'	Report	Eloi (yellow card) 23'; Costinha (yellow card) 32'; Trezeguet (yellow card) 45'; Contreras (yellow card) 79'; Sagnol (yellow card) 117'	Stadium: Stade de l'Abbé-Deschamps; Attendance: 10,901; Referee: Laurent Duhamel
	Penalties
	Carnot (penalty scored); Marlet (penalty scored); Reyes (penalty scored); Agboh (penalty scored) (penalty missed)		Giuly (penalty scored); Riise (penalty scored); Sagnol (penalty scored); Simone (penalty scored); Costinha (penalty scored)

29 January 2000 Round of 16	Monaco	2–3 (a.e.t.)	RC Strasbourg	Fontvieille
CET (UTC+1)	Giuly (yellow card) 85' (goal) 110'; Pršo 90'	Report	Bertin 31'; Marsiglia (yellow card) 38'; Amzine (yellow card) 56'; Garay 106', 118'	Stadium: Stade Louis II; Attendance: 4,973; Referee: Jean-Claude Puyalt

=== Coupe de France ===
21 January 2000 Round of 64	Racing 92	0–1	Monaco	Paris
CET (UTC+1)		[ Report]	Pršo 67'	Stadium: Stade Olympique Yves-du-Manoir

11 February 2000 Round of 32	Thouars Foot 79	1–2	Monaco	Nîmes
CET (UTC+1)	Dudoit 84'	[ Report]	Connen 73'; Léonard 76'	Stadium: Stade Jean-Bouin

4 March 2000 Round of 16	GSI Pontivy	0–4	Monaco	Guingamp
CET (UTC+1)		[ Report]	Pršo 49'; Eloi 63'; Riise 80', 82'	Stadium: Stade de Roudourou

19 March 2000 Quarter-final	Lyon	1–3	Monaco	Lyon
CET (UTC+1)	Laigle 35'	[ Report]	Pršo 59'; Simone 79'; Giuly 90'	Stadium: Stade de Gerland

12 April 2000 Semi-final	Monaco	0–1	Nantes	Fontvieille
CEST (UTC+2)		[ Report]	Da Rocha 82'	Stadium: Stade Louis II

=== UEFA Cup ===
==== First round ====
16 September 1999 First leg	Monaco (France)	3–0	(Scotland) St Johnstone	Fontvieille, Monaco
20:45 CEST (UTC+2)	Márquez (yellow card) 46'; Simone 69', 89'; Trezeguet 72'	Report	Bollan (yellow card) 67'; Lowndes (yellow card) 86'	Stadium: Stade Louis II; Referee: Edgar Steinborn

30 September 1999 Second leg	St Johnstone (Scotland)	3–3 (3–6 agg.)	(France) Monaco	Perth, Scotland
20:45 CEST (UTC+2)	Léonard 5' (o.g.); Dasovic 33'; O'Neil 75'	Report	Pršo 20'; Riise 24'; Legwinski (yellow card) 59' (goal) 69'; Márquez (yellow card) 73'	Stadium: McDiarmid Park; Referee: Victor José Esquinas Torres

==== Second round ====
21 October 1999 First leg	Widzew Łódź (Poland)	1–1	(France) Monaco	Łódź, Poland
18:00 CEST (UTC+2)	Wichniarek 5' (pen.); Gula (yellow card) 72'	Report	Contreras (yellow card) 32'; Giuly 40'; Lamouchi (yellow card) 71'; N'Diaye (yellow card) 75'; Márquez (yellow card) 87'	Stadium: Stadion Widzewa; Referee: Fiorenzo Treossi

2 November 1999 Second leg	Monaco (France)	2–0 (3–1 agg.)	(Poland) Widzew Łódź	Fontvieille, Monaco
18:00 CET (UTC+1)	Lamouchi 50'; Gallardo (yellow card) 58'; Léonard (yellow card) 63'; Trezeguet 84'	Report	Zając (yellow card) 62'; Terlecki (yellow card) 81'	Stadium: Stade Louis II; Referee: Ivan Dobrinov

==== Third round ====
23 November 1999 First leg	AEK Athens (Greece)	2–2	(France) Monaco	Athens, Greece
17:00 CET (UTC+1)	Nikolaidis (yellow card) 13' (goal) 45', 89'	Report	Giuly 26'; Gallardo (yellow card) 45'; Djetou (yellow card) 50'; Christanval (yellow card) 63'; Simone 78'; Lamouchi (yellow card) 84'	Stadium: Olympic Stadium; Referee: Claus Bo Larsen

9 December 1999 Second leg	Monaco (France)	1–0 (3-2 agg.)	(Greece) AEK Athens	Fontvieille, Monaco
19:30 CET (UTC+1)	Sagnol (yellow card) 24'; Simone 32'; Márquez (yellow card) 33'; Sylva (yellow card) 78'	Report	Grétarsson (yellow card) 42'; Kasapis (yellow card) 61'; Zikos (yellow card) 68'	Stadium: Stade Louis II; Attendance: 5,000; Referee: Dieter Schoch

==== Fourth round ====
2 March 2000 First leg	Mallorca (Spain)	4–1	(France) Monaco	Palma, Spain
21:30 CET (UTC+1)	Stanković 42', 53' (pen.), 62' (pen.); Tristán 90+2'	Report	Simone 2'; Sagnol (yellow card) 47'; Márquez (yellow card) 55' (yellow-red card) 55'; Barthez (yellow card) 62'; Costinha (yellow card) 71'	Stadium: Son Moix; Attendance: 17,755; Referee: Pierluigi Collina

9 March 2000 Second leg	Monaco (France)	1–0 (2–4 agg.)	(Spain) Mallorca	Fontvieille, Monaco
19:15 CET (UTC+1)	Simone 33'; Gallardo (yellow card) 52' (yellow-red card) 52'; Trezeguet (yellow card) 65'	Report	Engonga (yellow card) 26'; Carlitos (yellow card) 55'	Stadium: Stade Louis II; Attendance: 9,000; Referee: Graham Poll

== Statistics ==
=== Appearances and goals ===
No.	Pos	Nat	Player	Total		Division 1		Coupe de France		Coupe de la Ligue		UEFA Cup	
No.	Pos	Nat	Player	Apps	Goals	Apps	Goals	Apps	Goals	Apps	Goals	Apps	Goals
1	GK	(France) FRA	Fabien Barthez	31	0	24	0	0	0	2	0	5	0
2	DF	(Chile) CHI	Pablo Contreras	23	0	15+2	0	0	0	1	0	4+1	0
4	DF	(Mexico) MEX	Rafael Márquez	31	3	22+1	3	0	0	2	0	6	0
5	DF	(France) FRA	Philippe Christanval	32	0	25	0	0	0	0	0	6+1	0
6	DF	(France) FRA	Martin Djetou	30	0	20+2	0	0	0	2	0	5+1	0
7	MF	(France) FRA	Sabri Lamouchi	41	4	31+1	3	0	0	1	0	8	1
8	MF	(France) FRA	Ludovic Giuly	42	8	28+5	5	0	0	1+1	1	6+1	2
9	FW	(France) FRA	David Trezeguet	38	24	28+2	22	0	0	1	0	6+1	2
10	MF	(Argentina) ARG	Marcelo Gallardo	35	8	27+1	8	0	0	0	0	6+1	0
11	FW	(Italy) ITA	Marco Simone	43	27	34	21	0	0	2	0	7	6
12	FW	(Haiti) HAI	Wagneau Eloi	12	0	2+7	0	0	0	2	0	1	0
16	GK	(France) FRA	Jean-Marie Aubry	5	0	4	0	0	0	0	0	1	0
17	DF	(Belgium) BEL	Philippe Léonard	25	3	17+2	2	0	0	0	0	6	1
18	MF	(Portugal) POR	Costinha	35	1	25+3	1	0	0	2	0	4+1	0
19	DF	(France) FRA	Willy Sagnol	34	0	25+1	0	0	0	2	0	6	0
20	FW	(Croatia) CRO	Dado Pršo	27	4	7+13	2	0	0	1+1	1	1+4	1
21	MF	(Sweden) SWE	Pontus Farnerud	18	0	5+10	0	0	0	2	0	1	0
22	MF	(Senegal) SEN	Moussa N'Diaye	18	1	1+12	1	0	0	0	0	2+3	0
23	DF	(France) FRA	Bruno Irles	9	0	7+1	0	0	0	0	0	1	0
25	MF	(Senegal) SEN	Salif Diao	2	0	0+1	0	0	0	0	0	0+1	0
27	DF	(France) FRA	Julien Rodriguez	2	0	1+1	0	0	0	0	0	0	0
28	DF	(Norway) NOR	John Arne Riise	29	1	10+11	1	0	0	0+2	0	3+3	0
29	MF	(France) FRA	David di Tommaso	9	0	1+6	0	0	0	1	0	0+1	0
30	GK	(Senegal) SEN	Tony Sylva	9	0	5+1	0	0	0	0	0	2+1	0
31	MF	(France) FRA	Grégory Lacombe	2	0	0+1	0	0	0	0+1	0	0	0
40	GK	(France) FRA	Patrice Luzi	1	0	1	0	0	0	0	0	0	0
Players who left Monaco during the season:
3	DF	(France) FRA	Christophe Pignol	5	0	5	0	0	0	0	0	0	0
15	MF	(France) FRA	Sylvain Legwinski	12	1	4+6	0	0	0	0	0	1+1	1

=== Goal scorers ===
Place	Position	Nation	Number	Name	Division 1	Coupe de France	Coupe de la Ligue	UEFA Cup	Total
1	FW	(Italy)	11	Marco Simone	21	1	0	6	28
2	FW	(France)	9	David Trezeguet	22	0	0	2	24
3	MF	(Argentina)	10	Marcelo Gallardo	8	0	0	0	8
3	MF	(France)	8	Ludovic Giuly	5	1	1	2	8
5	FW	(Croatia)	20	Dado Pršo	2	2	1	1	6
6	MF	(France)	7	Sabri Lamouchi	3	0	0	1	4
6	DF	(Belgium)	17	Philippe Léonard	2	1	0	1	4
8	DF	(Mexico)	4	Rafael Márquez	3	0	0	0	3
8	DF	(Norway)	28	John Arne Riise	1	2	0	0	3
10	MF	(Senegal)	22	Moussa N'Diaye	1	0	0	0	1
10	MF	(Portugal)	18	Costinha	1	0	0	0	1
10	MF	(France)		Renaud Connen	0	1	0	0	1
10	FW	(Haiti)	12	Wagneau Eloi	0	1	0	0	1
10				Unknown	0	1	0	0	1
10	MF	(France)	15	Sylvain Legwinski	0	0	0	1	1
				TOTALS	69	10	2	14	95

=== Disciplinary record ===
Number	Nation	Position	Name	Division 1		Coupe de France		Coupe de la Ligue		UEFA Cup		Total	
Number	Nation	Position	Name	Booked	Sent off (straight red)	Booked	Sent off (straight red)	Booked	Sent off (straight red)	Booked	Sent off (straight red)	Booked	Sent off (straight red)
1	(France)	GK	Fabien Barthez	3	0	0	0	0	0	1	0	4	0
2	(Chile)	DF	Pablo Contreras	6	1	0	0	1	0	1	0	8	1
4	(Mexico)	DF	Rafael Márquez	5	0	0	0	0	0	6	1	11	1
5	(France)	DF	Philippe Christanval	5	0	0	0	0	0	1	0	6	0
6	(France)	DF	Martin Djetou	3	0	0	0	0	0	1	0	4	0
7	(France)	MF	Sabri Lamouchi	8	0	0	0	0	0	2	0	10	0
8	(France)	MF	Ludovic Giuly	3	0	0	0	1	0	0	0	4	0
9	(France)	FW	David Trezeguet	7	0	0	0	1	0	1	0	9	0
10	(Argentina)	MF	Marcelo Gallardo	9	1	0	0	0	0	4	1	13	2
11	(Italy)	FW	Marco Simone	4	0	0	0	0	0	0	0	4	0
12	(Haiti)	FW	Wagneau Eloi	0	0	0	0	1	0	0	0	1	0
15	(France)	MF	Sylvain Legwinski	3	0	0	0	0	0	1	0	4	0
17	(Belgium)	DF	Philippe Léonard	11	1	0	0	0	0	1	0	12	1
18	(Portugal)	MF	Costinha	12	0	0	0	1	0	1	0	14	0
19	(France)	DF	Willy Sagnol	4	0	0	0	1	0	2	0	7	0
20	(Croatia)	FW	Dado Pršo	2	0	0	0	0	0	0	0	2	0
22	(Senegal)	MF	Moussa N'Diaye	2	0	0	0	0	0	1	0	3	0
28	(Norway)	DF	John Arne Riise	1	0	0	0	0	0	0	0	1	0
29	(France)	DF	David Di Tommaso	1	0	0	0	0	0	0	0	1	0
30	(Senegal)	GK	Tony Sylva	0	0	0	0	0	0	1	0	1	0
			TOTALS	89	3	0	0	6	0	30	2	113	5
