= Willy Sagnol =

French footballer and manager (born 1977)

- Sagnol in 2024

Personal information
- Full name: Willy David Frédéric Sagnol
- Date of birth: 18 March 1977 (age 49)
- Place of birth: Saint-Étienne, Loire, France
- Height: 1.80 m (5 ft 11 in)
- Position: Right back

Youth career
- 1990–1995: Saint-Étienne

Senior career*
Years	Team	Apps	(Gls)
1995–1997	Saint-Étienne	46	(1)
1997–2000	Monaco	71	(0)
2000–2009	Bayern Munich	184	(7)
2003–2008	Bayern Munich II	3	(0)
Total		304	(8)

International career
1997	France U20	5	(0)
2000–2008	France	58	(0)

Managerial career
- 2013: France U20 (interim)
- 2013–2014: France U21
- 2014–2016: Bordeaux
- 2017: Bayern Munich (interim)
- 2021–2026: Georgia
Medal record
Men's football
Representing France
FIFA Confederations Cup
Winner	2001
Winner	2003
FIFA World Cup
Runner-up	2006
- * Club domestic league appearances and goals

Willy David Frédéric Sagnol (French pronunciation: [wili saɲɔl]; born 18 March 1977) is a French professional football manager and former player who played as a defender.

Sagnol spent much of his professional career playing for Bayern Munich in Germany's Bundesliga. He was also part of the French squad at the 1997 FIFA World Youth Championship, 2002 FIFA World Cup, UEFA Euro 2004, 2006 FIFA World Cup and UEFA Euro 2008.

As a manager, he had a two-year period in charge of Bordeaux before being appointed as coach of Georgia in 2021, subsequently leading them to their first ever major tournament by qualifying for UEFA Euro 2024.

== Early life ==
Willy David Frédéric Sagnol was born on 18 March 1977 in Saint-Étienne, Loire.

== Club career ==
Sagnol first made his way in the world of football at his father's former club in Haute-Loire, Montfaucon-en-Velay where he developed his defensive game at right back, as well as performing exceptionally on the right side of midfield.

=== Saint-Étienne ===
From Montfaucon he progressed, eventually joining the region's flagship club Saint-Étienne.

=== Monaco ===
An impressive two-year spell saw him earn a transfer to Monaco in 1997. With Monaco, he experienced his first taste of success, winning Division 1 in 2000. Sagnol also played in Jean Tigana's talented Monaco team which knocked Manchester United out of the UEFA Champions League in 1998 on away goals after a 1–1 draw at Old Trafford. His form saw him pressing for a call up to represent France internationally, but he was initially overlooked by national coach Roger Lemerre.

=== Bayern Munich ===
In the summer of 2000, Sagnol transferred to German club Bayern Munich, and did not take long to break into the first team. A solid defender but also equally comfortable operating in attacking positions (often as a wing back), Sagnol's superb crossing ability marked him out as a key player in Bayern's attacking play. With the Bavarian club, he won the Bundesliga in 2001, 2003, 2005, 2006 and 2008; the UEFA Champions League in 2001; and the DFB-Pokal in 2003, 2005, 2006 and 2008.

Because of continuing problems with his Achilles tendon, Sagnol announced his retirement from playing on 1 February 2009.

== International career ==
At international level, he had less success, often finding himself on the bench playing second fiddle to Lilian Thuram on the right side of the French defence. It was not until the retirement of Marcel Desailly and Thuram's consequent move into the centre of the French defence that Sagnol finally became first-choice right back in 2004, and remained there for the next four years.

Sagnol was part of France's squad for the 2006 FIFA World Cup in Germany, starting each of his country's seven games en route to the final. His competent performances, aided by France's progression to the final led to him being named as one of the outstanding defensive performers in the tournament. He saved his best display for the biggest stage of them all, the World Cup final, and was one of the better performers in a game largely remembered for off-the-ball events rather than on-the-field performances. Indeed, Sagnol's name could have been immortalised had his strong effort on goal not been successfully repelled by Gianluigi Buffon. Nonetheless, his performance was notable for a solid defensive contribution as well as important involvement in several attacking moves, such as when he provided a cross for his captain Zinedine Zidane, whose header was again saved by Buffon. Sagnol also took and scored the final spot kick for France in the shoot-out, which they lost 5–3.

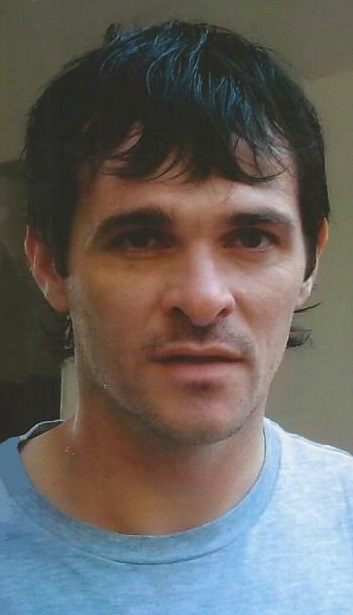
Sagnol in 2007

In the qualification campaign for UEFA Euro 2008, fans saw a completely new side of Sagnol. On several occasions, Sagnol had good efforts on goal as well as still supplying his trademark crosses for teammates like Thierry Henry against Scotland at Hampden Park on 7 October 2006. Sagnol was one of his country's better performers in France's shock loss, having three efforts on goal from his right back spot, one in particular forcing a save from Scottish goalkeeper Craig Gordon. The following match, against the Faroe Islands in Paris, was his 50th for his country. His displays in that qualification campaign once more provided proof that Sagnol could be counted on for his consistent defensive play and also to provide extra quality when joining the attack.

== Coaching career ==
=== Bordeaux ===
Sagnol was head coach of the France national under-21 team until he was appointed head coach of Bordeaux on 23 May 2014. He signed a two-year contract which expired on 30 June 2016. Girondins de Bordeaux originally wanted Zinedine Zidane as their head coach. This was Sagnol's first coaching job at club level. In Sagnol's first season, Bordeaux finished sixth in Ligue 1, the round of 32 in the Coupe de France, and the round of 16 in the Coupe de la Ligue. The season included a 4–1 win against Monaco, a 3–2 win against Paris Saint-Germain and a 5–0 loss to Lyon.

In the 2015–16 season, Bordeaux defeated AEK Larnaca and Kairat Almaty to qualify for the group stage of the UEFA Europa League. Bordeaux started the league season with a win, four draws and a loss. On matchday seven, on 23 September 2015, Bordeaux lost to Nice 6–1.

Sagnol was dismissed on 14 March 2016 after a 4–0 loss to Toulouse in the Derby de la Garonne.

=== Bayern Munich ===
On 9 June 2017, Sagnol re-joined Bayern Munich as an assistant coach under Carlo Ancelotti. Ancelotti was dismissed by the club on 28 September 2017 and Sagnol was announced as interim manager. After managing Bayern for eight days and one match (a 2–2 draw against Hertha BSC), Sagnol left the club when permanent manager Jupp Heynckes and his assistants Peter Hermann and Hermann Gerland were announced.

=== Georgia ===
Sagnol was appointed the manager of the Georgia national team on 15 February 2021. In 2024, he led them to their first ever major international tournament, UEFA Euro 2024, after defeating Greece in the qualifying play-off final on penalties. He led Georgia to the knockout stage of the final tournament following a 2–0 victory against Portugal in the last group game. They were defeated by Spain in the round of 16 despite taking the lead early in the game.

On 12 November 2024, he signed a new contract with Georgia through 2028.

== Personal life ==
He is married and has four children.

== Career statistics ==
=== Club ===
Appearances and goals by club, season and competition
Club	Season	League			National Cup (Note: Includes Coupe de France, DFB-Pokal)		Continental (Note: Includes UEFA Champions League, UEFA Cup)		Other (Note: Includes Trophée des Champions, Coupe de la Ligue, DFL-Ligapokal, DFL-Supercup, UEFA Super Cup, Intercontinental Cup)		Total	
Club	Season	Division	Apps	Goals	Apps	Goals	Apps	Goals	Apps	Goals	Apps	Goals
Saint-Étienne	1995–96	Division 1	10	0			—		—		10	0
Saint-Étienne	1996–97	Division 2	36	1			—		—		36	1
Saint-Étienne	Total		46	1			—		—		46	1
Monaco	1997–98	Division 1	25	0			8	0	—		33	0
Monaco	1998–99	Division 1	20	0			4	0	—		24	0
Monaco	1999–2000	Division 1	26	0	2	0	6	0	2	0	36	0
Monaco	Total		71	0	2	0	18	0	2	0	93	0
Bayern Munich	2000–01	Bundesliga	27	0	1	0	0	0	1	0	29	0
Bayern Munich	2001–02	Bundesliga	28	1	1	0	10	0	2	0	41	1
Bayern Munich	2002–03	Bundesliga	23	2	5	1	4	0	1	0	33	3
Bayern Munich	2003–04	Bundesliga	21	1	3	0	6	0	0	0	30	1
Bayern Munich	2004–05	Bundesliga	22	1	3	0	7	0	0	0	32	1
Bayern Munich	2005–06	Bundesliga	31	1	5	0	7	0	1	0	44	1
Bayern Munich	2006–07	Bundesliga	23	1	3	0	0	0	2	0	28	1
Bayern Munich	2007–08	Bundesliga	9	0	3	0	5	0	0	0	17	0
Bayern Munich	2008–09	Bundesliga	0	0	0	0	0	0	0	0	0	0
Bayern Munich	Total		184	7	24	1	39	0	7	0	254	8
Bayern Munich II	2003–04	Regionalliga Süd	1	0	—		—		—		1	0
Bayern Munich II	2004–05	Regionalliga Süd	0	0	1	0	—		—		1	0
Bayern Munich II	2007–08	Regionalliga Süd	2	0	—		—		—		2	0
Bayern Munich II	Total		3	0	1	0	—		—		4	0
Career total			304	8	27	1	57	0	9	0	397	9

=== International ===
Appearances and goals by national team and year
National team	Year	Apps	Goals
France	2000	1	0
France	2001	7	0
France	2002	4	0
France	2003	8	0
France	2004	7	0
France	2005	7	0
France	2006	17	0
France	2007	2	0
France	2008	5	0
Total		58	0

=== Coaching record ===
As of match played 25 September 2026

Team	From	To	Record								
Team	From	To	M	W	D	L	GF	GA	GD	Win %	Ref.
France U20	1 June 2013	10 June 2013	0	0	0	0	0	0	+0	—	
France U21	1 July 2013	30 June 2014	8	6	2	0	23	0	+23	75.00	
Bordeaux	1 July 2014	14 March 2016	88	35	28	25	117	118	−1	39.77	
Bayern Munich (interim)	28 September 2017	6 October 2017	1	0	1	0	2	2	+0	0.00	
Georgia	15 February 2021	26 September 2026	59	25	11	23	95	81	+14	42.37	
Total			156	66	42	48	237	207	+30	42.31	

== Honours ==
Monaco

- Division 1: 1999–2000
- Trophée des Champions: 1997

Bayern Munich

- Bundesliga: 2000–01, 2002–03, 2004–05, 2005–06, 2007–08
- DFB-Pokal: 2002–03, 2004–05, 2005–06, 2007–08
- DFL-Ligapokal: 2000
- UEFA Champions League: 2000–01
- Intercontinental Cup: 2001

France

- FIFA Confederations Cup: 2001, 2003
- FIFA World Cup runner-up: 2006
