= John Arne Riise =

Norwegian football manager (born 1980)

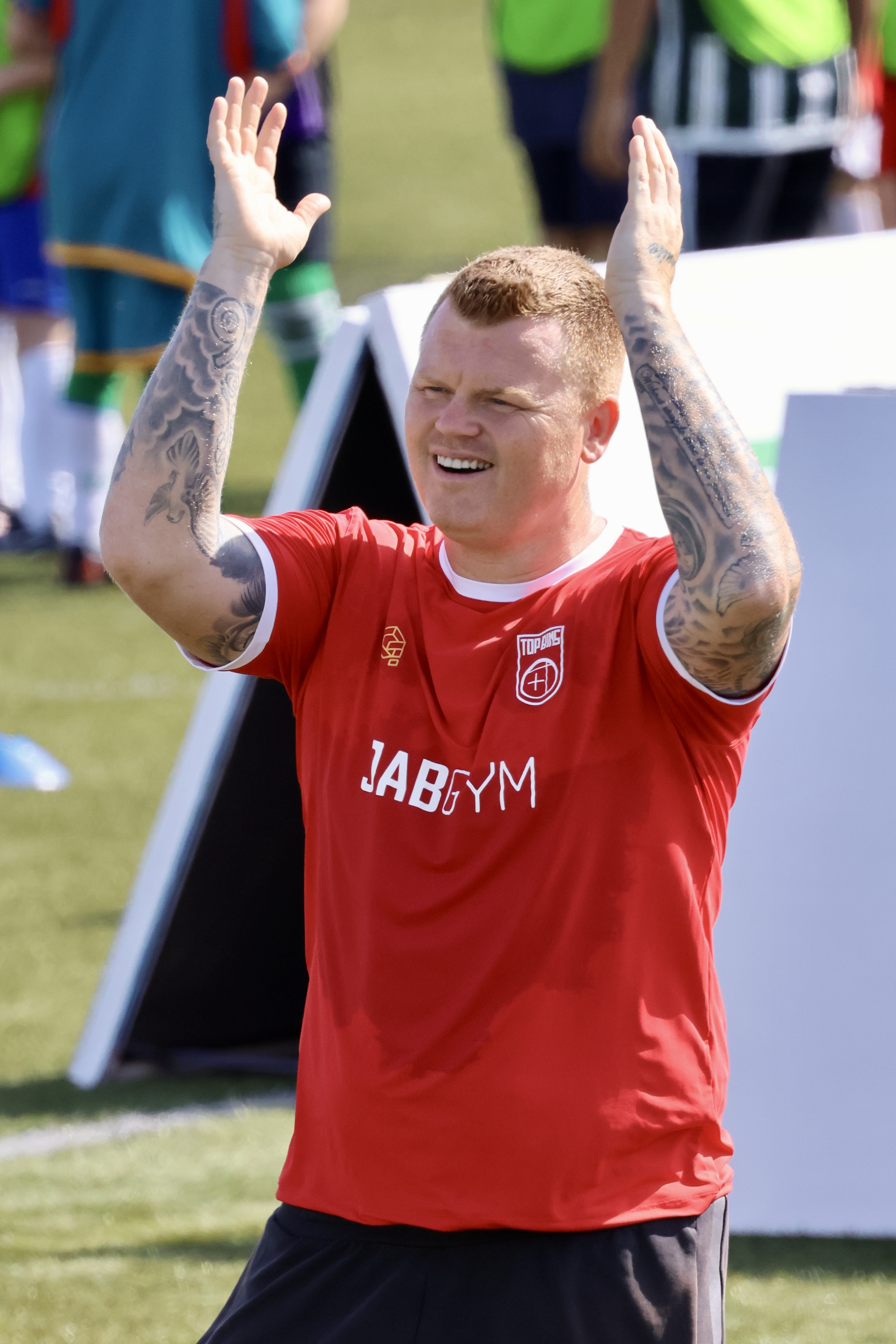
- Riise in 2024

Personal information
- Full name: John Arne Semundseth Riise
- Date of birth: 24 September 1980 (age 46)
- Place of birth: Molde, Norway
- Height: 1.85 m (6 ft 1 in)
- Positions: Left-back; left winger

Youth career
- 1996: Aalesund

Senior career*
Years	Team	Apps	(Gls)
1996–1998	Aalesund	26	(5)
1998–1999	Monaco 2	9	(2)
1998–2001	Monaco	44	(4)
2001–2008	Liverpool	234	(21)
2008–2011	Roma	99	(7)
2011–2014	Fulham	87	(0)
2014–2015	APOEL	25	(4)
2015–2016	Delhi Dynamos	13	(1)
2016	Aalesund	10	(0)
2016–2017	Chennaiyin	10	(1)
2017	Rollon	2	(0)
2023	Avaldsnes	1	(1)
Total		560	(46)

International career
1996	Norway U15	9	(2)
1997	Norway U16	5	(2)
1997	Norway U17	2	(0)
1997–1999	Norway U18	8	(0)
1999	Norway U19	1	(0)
1999–2001	Norway U21	17	(2)
2000–2013	Norway	110	(16)

Managerial career
- 2019–2021: Flint Tønsberg
- 2021–2023: Avaldsnes
- * Club domestic league appearances and goals

John Arne Semundseth Riise (born 24 September 1980) is a Norwegian former professional footballer and coach.

With 110 caps, Riise is the most capped player for the Norway national team. He was named in the Norway squad for UEFA Euro 2000 but did not play in the tournament. Riise scored 16 goals before his retirement from international duty in 2013. He spent seven years playing for Premier League side Liverpool, in which he won many honours, including the 2004–05 UEFA Champions League, before moving to Roma in 2008. The Norwegian Football Federation has described him as the Norwegian player with the most appearances in the Premier League.

== Club career ==
=== Early career ===
Riise began his career in his homeland with Aalesund. After a single season as a senior player for the club, he moved abroad in 1998, playing the formative years of his professional career with French club Monaco. When Aalesund opened their new stadium in April 2005, businessman Olav Nils Sunde donated a statue to the club, which was erected in front of the stadium. While Sunde denied it, the statue bore a very strong resemblance to Riise. In 2007, when Riise played in the Champions League Final, a Norwegian commentator demanded the statue officially carry his name. Riise himself has said, "[The name change] is not for me to decide. Everyone sees who it is, and I know that it was made for me."

Riise was a regular member of the 1999–2000 Ligue 1 championship-winning side, however, he fell out of favour with coach Claude Puel after admitting his desire to leave. Riise was a subject of interest from Premier League clubs, especially Fulham and Leeds United that both offered £4 million bids in 2000, though both came to nothing as Monaco wanted £6 million for him.

He was then sold to Liverpool for £4 million the following summer.

=== Liverpool ===
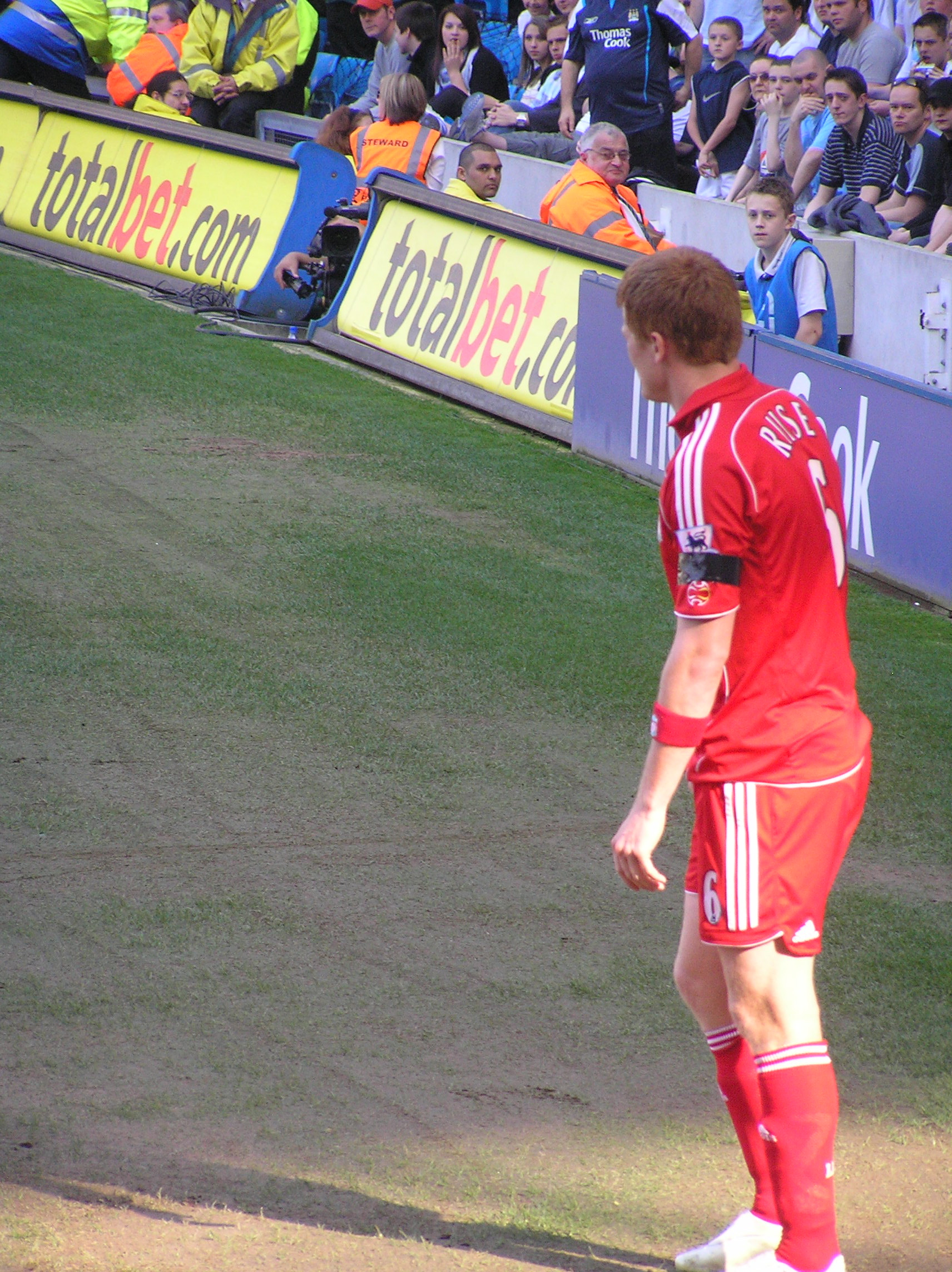
Riise playing for Liverpool.

He made his debut for Liverpool in the 2001 UEFA Super Cup game against Bayern Munich played at the Stade Louis II. He scored as Liverpool went on to win the game 3–2. He also scored important goals throughout the Premier League season against teams such as Arsenal, Everton, Newcastle United and Manchester United. Riise initially wore the number 18 shirt but changed to the number 6 shirt in 2004–05 season, which had been vacated by defender Markus Babbel. He scored 8 goals in his first season with Liverpool.

Riise endured what were considered below-average seasons by most in the 2002–03 and 2003–04 seasons, but he rediscovered his form in 2004–05 following the appointment of Rafael Benítez as manager. He won a UEFA Champions League winner's medal, providing the assist for Liverpool's first goal of the final, although his attempt in the penalty shoot-out against Milan was saved. In the 2005 Football League Cup Final, he scored 45 seconds into the game, the fastest goal in the fixture history, according to the official Liverpool homepage; however, Chelsea eventually prevailed 3–2 after extra time.

In January 2006, Riise signed a new contract at Anfield to keep him at the club until 2009. In February 2008, Riise announced his desire to stay at Liverpool for the rest of his career.

Riise helped the club to win the 2005–06 FA Cup, scoring in the semi-final against Chelsea and successfully converting his attempt in the penalty shoot-out against West Ham in the final.

After a poor run of form in Liverpool's away games in the autumn of 2006, Riise reacted to comments made by teammates Pepe Reina and Jamie Carragher that Liverpool could effectively write off their chances of winning the league, saying, "We never give up. Cowards give up."

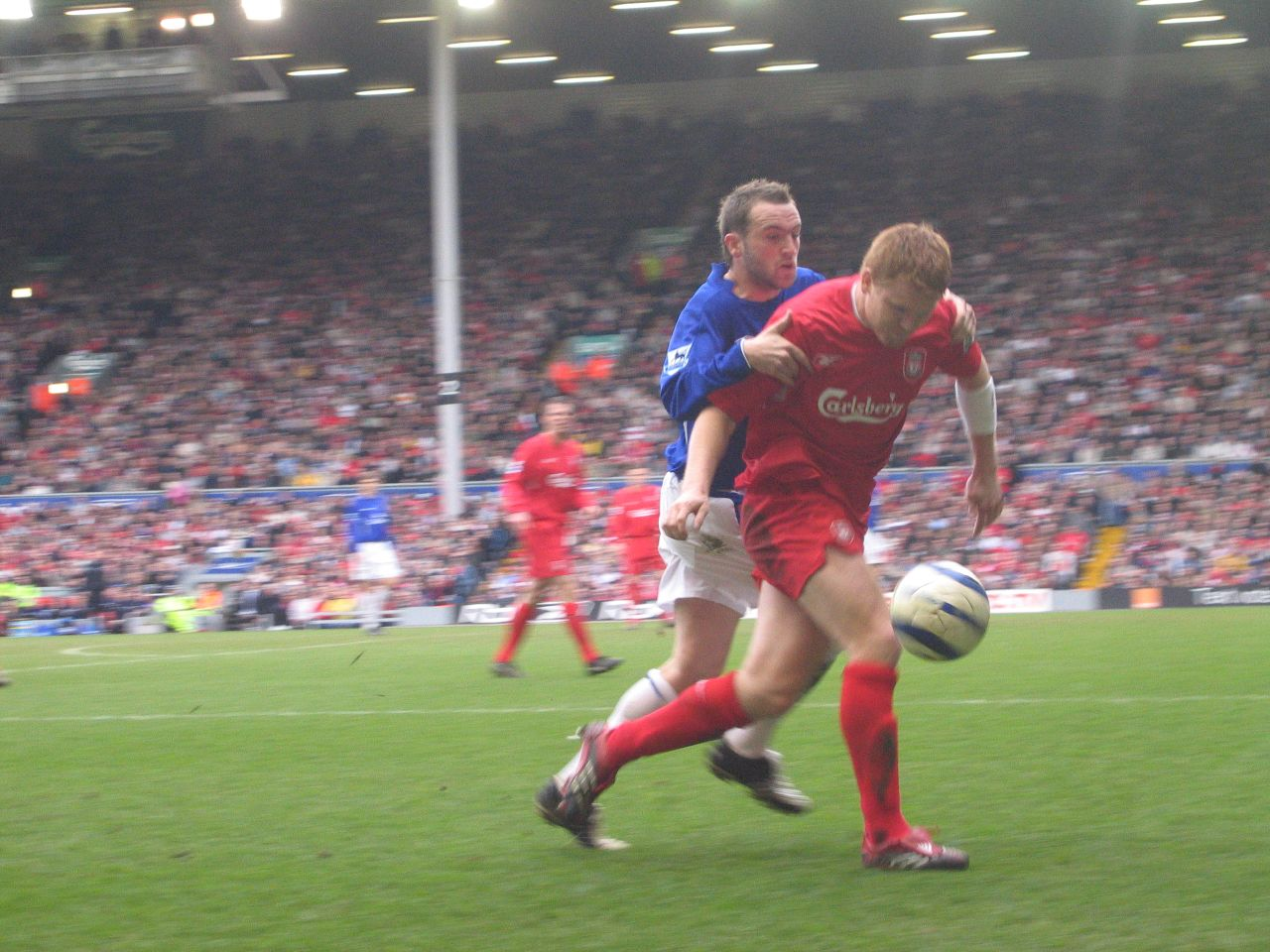
Riise competing in a match against Everton.

Riise made it into the list of the top 50 Liverpool appearance-makers of all time when he played in the 5–0 victory over Luton Town on 15 January 2008.

On 22 April 2008, in Liverpool's Champions League semi-final first leg against Chelsea at Anfield, Riise scored an own goal in the 95th minute to equalise. Liverpool went on to lose 3–2 after extra time in the away match and were eliminated from the tournament 4–3 on aggregate.

Riise made 348 appearances in all competitions for Liverpool. In an interview with Talksport in 2025, Riise said when manager Rafael Benítez told him he was being released, the player asked if he could appear in two additional matches as a substitute to achieve a 350 appearances milestone. Benítez denied his request. “I went to the dressing room and the guys asked me what happened and I said, ‘I’m done’. I went to the car, cried a little bit by myself. Called my agent, cried to him," Riise said in the interview. “It was such a shock as I’d been there for seven seasons."

=== Roma ===
Throughout the 2007–08 season, Riise's natural place in the side was often taken by Fábio Aurélio, the Brazilian establishing himself as the club's first choice left-back. On 18 June 2008, after being linked with moves to other English clubs, Riise signed a four-year contract with Italian Serie A club Roma. The club paid €5 million total (which could go up to €5.5 million), including €2.8 million per year. Riise soon became a fan favourite with his hard working spirit which drove Roma to several important victories. In fact, Riise's first goal for the club was against league leaders Internazionale in a pivotal top of the table game. Two months later, he scored again in the same stadium against Milan with a free kick into the top right corner, also providing an assist for Roma's second goal of the game. Riise was named the Man of the Match for the game, which ended 3–2 in favour of Roma. On 24 January 2010, Riise scored a late header three minutes into injury time in Roma's 2–1 away win over Juventus. He was also responsible for the dismissal of influential goalkeeper Gianluigi Buffon in the same game after making a terrific run leaving Buffon no choice but to foul the full-back. Given the nature of the game, it is seen as one of Riise's most memorable moments in a Roma jersey.

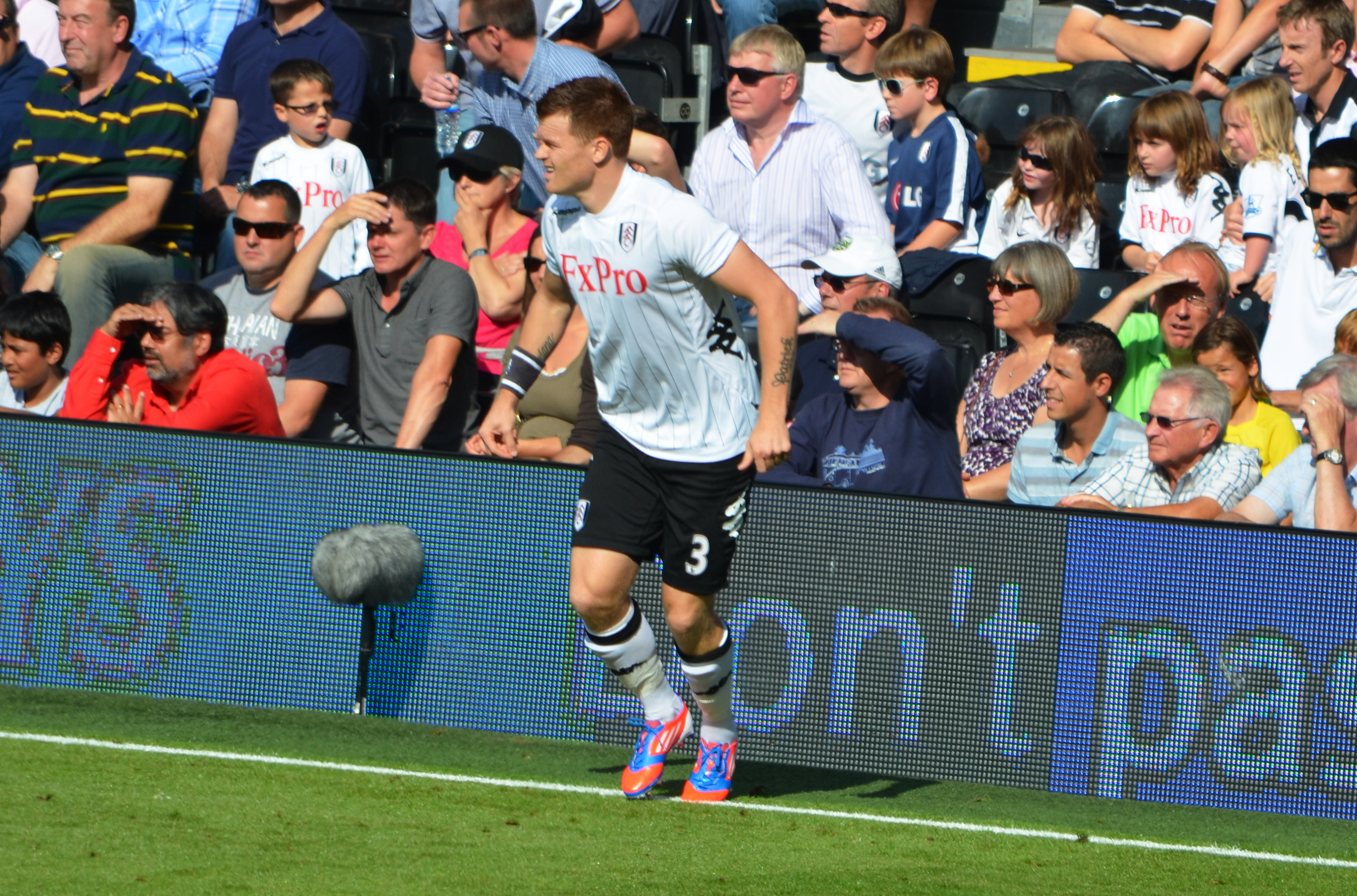
Riise playing for Fulham in 2012

=== Fulham ===
On 13 July 2011, Fulham announced that Riise had signed a three-year deal with the club for an undisclosed fee. Riise joined his brother, Bjørn Helge Riise, at Fulham who signed for the club in 2009. Riise made his Fulham debut on 21 July 2011, playing in the UEFA Europa League against Crusaders at Craven Cottage.

On 23 May 2014, he was released from the club at the end of his contract.

=== APOEL ===
On 1 September 2014, John Arne Riise signed a one-year contract, with the option of a further season with Cypriot side APOEL. He made his official debut on 20 September 2014, playing the full 90 minutes and providing two assists in APOEL's 3–1 away victory against Ayia Napa for the Cypriot First Division. He made his only 2014–15 UEFA Champions League group stage appearance with APOEL on 21 October 2014, coming on as a 41st-minute substitute in his team's 0–1 home defeat to Paris Saint-Germain. He scored his first official goal for APOEL on 11 January 2015, opening the scoreline in his team's 1–2 defeat at AEL Limassol for the Cypriot First Division. On 20 May 2015, Riise played a key role in APOEL's 4–2 win over AEL in the final of the Cypriot Cup, scoring his side's decisive fourth goal with a trademark blistering 30-metre free-kick and lifted his first trophy with APOEL in Cyprus. On 24 May 2015, APOEL secured their third consecutive Cypriot league title after beating Ermis Aradippou 4–2, and Riise celebrated the second championship trophy of his career, 15 years after winning the French league with Monaco. On 25 May 2015, one day after winning the double with APOEL, the team announced that Riise's contract was terminated by mutual consent.

=== Delhi Dynamos ===
On 24 August 2015, Indian Super League side Delhi Dynamos confirmed the signing of Riise for the upcoming 2015 tournament.

=== Aalesund ===
On 11 March 2016, Riise announced on his Twitter page that he had signed for Aalesunds FK, marking his return to the club at which he began his career. Riise later wrote that his return to Aalesund was motivated partly by a desire to finish his career where it had begun, to play again with his brother, and to live closer to his eldest daughter who was based in Ålesund with her mother.

Shortly before the move on 8 March 2016, Riise temporarily terminated his agreement with betting company Betsson which had complicated his return to Norwegian football. In his autobiography, he said the Norwegian Football Federation had told him he could not play in the top flight while being paid by a competing betting company. He wrote that Betsson proposed suspending the deal so he could complete the move, and that already-produced advertisements were withdrawn. After leaving Aalesund, he resumed his role as a Betsson ambassador.

Riise’s return to Aalesund was brief. He later described the spell as unsuccessful, saying that he struggled for form, was often substituted, and lost motivation after thirteen matches. He scored once during the comeback, a penalty in a Norwegian Cup tie against Brattvåg, which Aalesund lost on penalties.

On 13 June 2016, shortly after ending his spell with Aalesund, Riise announced his retirement from football at the age of 35.

=== Chennaiyin ===
On 18 August 2016, Riise returned from retirement to play for Indian Super League club Chennaiyin on a two-month contract, as a marquee signing for the Indian club. Co-owner Vita Dani said that he was "delighted" at the signing, and praised Riise's "exceptional" experience as a player. He played ten matches for the club and also scored a goal in the season.

=== Avaldsnes ===
In June 2023, Riise came out of retirement for a second time to sign for fifth-tier Avaldsnes IL, the women's team of which he was currently managing. Riise made his debut as a substitute for their men's team in a 9-2 win over Rubbestadnes IL, scoring his first goal for the club 24 minutes after coming on.

== International career ==
Riise made his debut for the Norway national team against Iceland on 31 January 2000. His first international goals came against Turkey in a Friendly match on 23 February 2000, a game Norway won 2–0. Later that year, he made the only international tournament appearance of his career at UEFA Euro 2000, but was an unused substitute in all three of the team's Group C matches. Through the next decade, Riise was Norway's first-choice left-back, and on 12 November 2011, he played his 100th international match when Norway lost 4–1 against Wales. On 15 August 2012, Riise played his 104th match for Norway and equalled Thorbjørn Svenssen's record as the most capped Norwegian player, eventually surpassing it before retiring from international football in 2013.

== Style of play ==
According to his profile on Fulham FC's website, Riise was "renowned for his unrivalled stamina and powerful shooting ... impressing both as an accomplished defender and as a marauding full-back." He also was a threat from set pieces. While primarily a left-back, he often also played as a left midfielder whilst at Liverpool.

== Post-playing career ==
On 4 January 2019, Riise joined Maltese club Birkirkara as a sports director but resigned after less than three months for personal reasons.

On 5 November 2019, Riise was announced as the new manager of Norwegian Third Division club Flint Tønsberg. He left the club at the end of the 2021 season which ended with relegation to the Norwegian Fourth Division.

On 8 December 2021, Riise was presented as the new manager of Toppserien club Avaldsnes on a two-year contract. In the 2022 Toppserien, Avaldsnes had to contest the relegation playoff, but survived following a 3–2 aggregate score against Øvrevoll Hosle. Avaldsnes were relegated from the 2023 Toppserien due to financial problems and Riise announced his departure from the club on 20 December 2023.

== Personal life ==
Riise has a younger brother named Bjørn Helge Riise who was also a Norwegian international. The two both played for Fulham in the 2011–12 season. Riise's nephew, Fillip Jenssen Riise, is also a professional footballer, currently playing for Stabæk.

Riise was married to his childhood sweetheart, the Norwegian model Guri Havnevik, from 2003 until they divorced in 2004. He has one daughter with Guri named Ariana, born in January 2001. He has Ariana's name tattooed on his right arm.

Riise got engaged to Maria Elvegard in 2007. The couple were due to be married in the summer of 2008 but had to postpone the day after moving to Rome. They married on 21 June 2010 in a private ceremony in New York City, inviting only their family and close friends. Maria decided to have a double-barrelled surname, Elvegard-Riise. With Maria, he has one daughter named Emma born on 4 August 2009 and one son named Patrick born in November 2011. He has Emma's name and date of birth tattooed on his left arm. He also has Patrick's name tattooed on his left arm. In February 2012, they announced that they would divorce.

In May 2014, he married Louise Angelica.

Since retiring as a player Riise has been involved in various bankruptcies, either by him directly or by companies owned or managed by him. He was sued by his ex-wife for an alleged illegal removal of funds from an account belonging to their child. He also received publicized financial assistance from Silje Sandmæl, one of the main economists from the popular TV-show "Luksusfellen", which is a reality-like show that explores the hardships of people in helpless financial situations.

On the ninth of August 2019, his fourth child, Colin, was born with Louise Angelica Riise.

Riise would prepare for big matches by relaxing in his hotel room and binge-watching his favourite TV series. In preparation for the 2005 Champions League Final, he watched 24.

== Career statistics ==
=== Club ===
Appearances and goals by club, season and competition
Club	Season	League			National cup (Note: Includes Coupe de France, FA Cup, Coppa Italia, Cypriot Cup, Norwegian Football Cup)		League cup (Note: Includes Coupe de la Ligue, Football League Cup)		Continental		Other		Total	
Club	Season	Division	Apps	Goals	Apps	Goals	Apps	Goals	Apps	Goals	Apps	Goals	Apps	Goals
Aalesund	1997	Norwegian First Division	9	1	0	0	—		—		—		9	1
Aalesund	1998	Norwegian First Division	17	4	0	0	—		—		—		17	4
Aalesund	Total		26	5	0	0	—		—		—		26	5
Monaco 2	1998–99	Championnat National 2	9	2	—		—		—		—		9	2
Monaco	1998–99	French Division 1	7	0	1	0	2	0	1 (Note: Appearance(s) in UEFA Cup)	0	—		11	0
Monaco	1999–2000	French Division 1	21	1	3	2	2	0	6	1	—		32	4
Monaco	2000–01	French Division 1	16	3	0	0	2	0	2 (Note: Appearances in UEFA Champions League)	0	1 (Note: Appearance in Trophée des Champions)	0	21	3
Monaco	Total		44	4	4	2	6	0	9	1	1	0	64	7
Liverpool	2001–02	Premier League	38	7	2	0	0	0	14	0	2 (Note: One appearance in FA Community Shield, one appearance and one goal in UEFA Super Cup)	1	56	8
Liverpool	2002–03	Premier League	37	6	3	0	4	0	11 (Note: Six appearances in UEFA Champions League, five appearances in UEFA Cup)	0	1 (Note: Appearance in FA Community Shield)	0	56	6
Liverpool	2003–04	Premier League	28	0	1	0	2	0	4	0	—		35	0
Liverpool	2004–05	Premier League	37	6	0	0	5	1	15	1	—		57	8
Liverpool	2005–06	Premier League	32	1	6	3	0	0	14	0	3 (Note: One appearance in UEFA Super Cup, two appearances in FIFA Club World Cup)	0	52	4
Liverpool	2006–07	Premier League	33	1	1	0	1	1	12	2	1	1	48	5
Liverpool	2007–08	Premier League	29	0	4	0	1	0	10	0	—		44	0
Liverpool	Total		234	21	17	3	13	2	77	3	7	2	348	31
Roma	2008–09	Serie A	31	2	2	0	—		8	0	1 (Note: Appearance in Supercoppa Italiana)	0	42	2
Roma	2009–10	Serie A	36	5	4	0	—		12 (Note: Appearances in UEFA Europa League)	3	—		52	8
Roma	2010–11	Serie A	32	0	4	0	—		5	0	1	1	42	1
Roma	Total		99	7	10	0	—		25	3	2	1	136	11
Fulham	2011–12	Premier League	36	0	2	0	0	0	6	0	—		44	0
Fulham	2012–13	Premier League	31	0	1	0	0	0	—		—		32	0
Fulham	2013–14	Premier League	20	0	2	0	3	0	—		—		25	0
Fulham	Total		87	0	5	0	3	0	6	0	—		101	0
APOEL	2014–15	Cypriot First Division	25	4	4	2	—		1	0	—		30	6
Delhi Dynamos	2015	Indian Super League	13	1	—		—		—		2 (Note: Appearances in Indian Super League play-offs)	0	15	1
Aalesund	2016	Tippeligaen	10	0	3	1	—		—		—		13	1
Chennaiyin	2016	Indian Super League	10	1	—		—		—		—		10	1
Rollon	2017	4. divisjon	2	0	—		—		—		—		2	0
Career total			559	45	43	8	22	2	118	7	12	3	754	65

=== International ===
Appearances and goals by national team and year
National team	Year	Apps	Goals
Norway	2000	7	1
Norway	2001	4	0
Norway	2002	9	2
Norway	2003	11	0
Norway	2004	10	0
Norway	2005	10	2
Norway	2006	6	0
Norway	2007	11	2
Norway	2008	8	1
Norway	2009	9	4
Norway	2010	7	1
Norway	2011	8	1
Norway	2012	8	2
Norway	2013	2	0
Total		110	16

Scores and results list Norway's goal tally first, score column indicates score after each Riise goal.

List of international goals scored by John Arne Riise
No.	Date	Venue	Opponent	Score	Result	Competition
1	23 February 2000	Ali Sami Yen Stadium, Istanbul, Turkey	Turkey	1–0	2–0	Friendly
2	7 September 2002	Ullevaal Stadion, Oslo, Norway	Denmark	1–1	2–2	UEFA Euro 2004 qualification
3	16 October 2002	Ullevaal Stadion, Oslo, Norway	Bosnia and Herzegovina	2–0	2–0	UEFA Euro 2004 qualification
4	9 February 2005	Ta'Qali Stadium, Ta' Qali, Malte	Malta	3–0	3–0	Friendly
5	8 June 2005	Råsunda Stadium, Stockholm, Sweden	Sweden	1–1	3–2	Friendly
6	2 June 2007	Ullevaal Stadion, Oslo, Norway	Malta	4–0	4–0	UEFA Euro 2008 qualification
7	12 September 2007	Ullevaal Stadion, Oslo, Norway	Greece	2–2	2–2	UEFA Euro 2008 qualification
8	28 May 2008	Ullevaal Stadion, Oslo, Norway	Uruguay	2–2	2–2	Friendly
9	1 April 2009	Ullevaal Stadion, Oslo, Norway	Finland	1–1	3–2	Friendly
10	12 August 2009	Ullevaal Stadion, Oslo, Norway	Scotland	1–0	4–0	FIFA World Cup 2010 qualification
11	5 September 2009	Laugardalsvöllur, Reykjavík, Iceland	Iceland	1–0	1–1	FIFA World Cup 2010 qualification
12	9 September 2009	Ullevaal Stadion, Oslo, Norway	Macedonia	1–0	2–1	FIFA World Cup 2010 qualification
13	8 October 2010	Antonis Papadopoulos Stadium, Larnaca, Cyprus	Cyprus	1–0	2–1	UEFA Euro 2012 qualification
14	10 August 2011	Ullevaal Stadion, Oslo, Norway	Czech Republic	2–0	3–0	Friendly
15	15 August 2012	Ullevaal Stadion, Oslo, Norway	Greece	2–3	2–3	Friendly
16	11 September 2012	Ullevaal Stadion, Oslo, Norway	Slovenia	2–1	2–1	FIFA World Cup 2014 qualification

== Honours ==
Monaco

- Division 1: 1999–2000
- Trophée des Champions: 2000

Liverpool

- FA Cup: 2005–06
- Football League Cup: 2002–03; runner-up: 2004–05
- FA Community Shield: 2001, 2006
- UEFA Champions League: 2004–05; runner-up: 2006–07
- UEFA Super Cup: 2001, 2005
- FIFA Club World Championship runner-up: 2005

APOEL

- Cypriot First Division: 2014–15
- Cypriot Cup: 2014–15

Individual

- Kniksen of the Year: 2006

== See also ==
- List of men's footballers with 100 or more international caps
