= Grégory Lacombe =

French footballer (born 1982)

Personal information
- Full name: Grégory Lacombe
- Date of birth: January 11, 1982 (age 44)
- Place of birth: Albi, France
- Height: 1.65 m (5 ft 5 in)
- Position: Attacking midfielder

Youth career
  - 1999: Monaco

Senior career*
Years	Team	Apps	(Gls)
2000 – 2005	Monaco	12	(1)
2002 – 2004	→ Ajaccio (loan)	50	(7)
2005 – 2006	Vitoria Setubal	12	(1)
2006 – 2007	Ajaccio	22	(2)
2007 – 2012	Montpellier	65	(9)
2011 – 2012	→ Monaco (loan)	8	(0)
2012 – 2013	Clermont	21	(1)
2013 – 2014	Uzès Pont du Gard	5	(1)

International career
?	France U-19	5	(1)
- * Club domestic league appearances and goals as of October 10, 2013

Grégory Lacombe (born 11 January 1982) is a French former professional footballer who played as a midfielder for clubs in Ligue 1 and Ligue 2.

== Career ==
A native of Albi, Lacombe signed his first professional football contract with AS Monaco at age 17. He was part of the Monaco side that won the 1999–2000 French Division 1 title. Lacombe had two brief spells with AC Ajaccio and one with Portuguese side Vitória F.C. before a six-year association with Montpellier HSC. Lacombe also won the 2011–12 Ligue 1 title while playing for Montpellier.
