= Ludovic Giuly =

French footballer (born 1976)

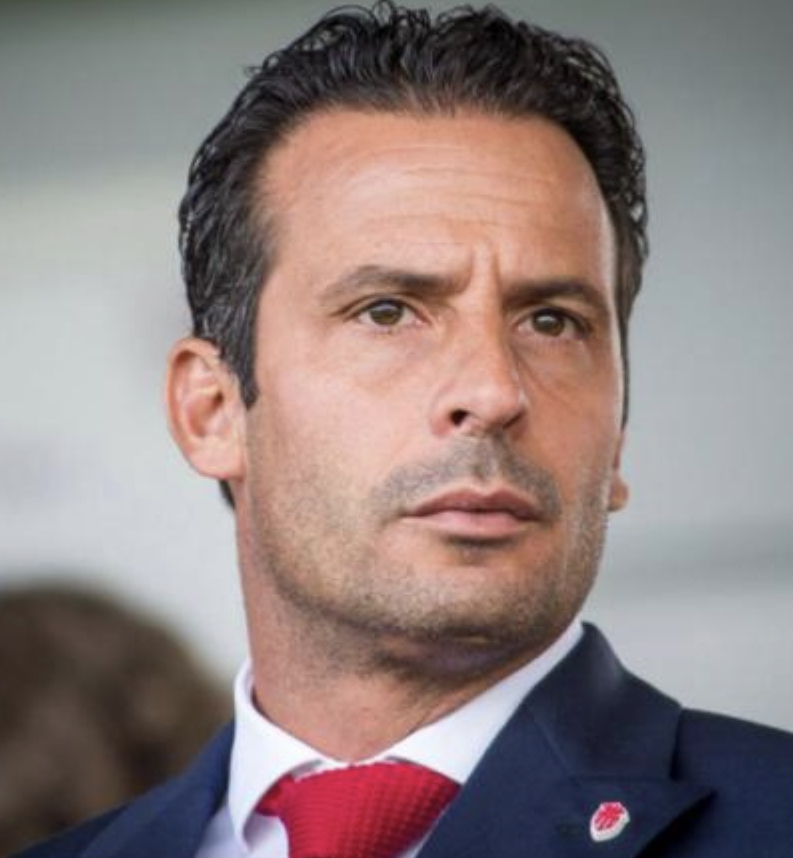
- Giuly in 2017

Personal information
- Full name: Ludovic Vincent Giuly
- Date of birth: 10 July 1976 (age 50)
- Place of birth: Lyon, Rhône-Alpes, France
- Height: 1.64 m (5 ft 5 in)
- Position: Winger

Team information
- Current team: Lyon (assistant manager)

Senior career*
Years	Team	Apps	(Gls)
1994–1998	Lyon	100	(21)
1998–2004	Monaco	184	(47)
2004–2007	Barcelona	85	(19)
2007–2008	Roma	32	(6)
2008–2011	Paris Saint-Germain	100	(16)
2011–2012	Monaco	27	(3)
2012–2013	Lorient	17	(1)
2013–2016	Monts d'Or Azergues	36	(15)
Total		581	(128)

International career
2000–2005	France	17	(3)
2011	Corsica	1	(0)
Medal record
Men's football
Representing France
FIFA Confederations Cup
Winner	2003
- * Club domestic league appearances and goals

Ludovic Vincent Giuly (born 10 July 1976) is a French former professional footballer who played as a winger.

Giuly represented France at international level, gaining 17 caps over a five-year period and was a member of their 2003 FIFA Confederations Cup-winning squad. One of his greatest moments was being part of Barcelona's squad, as he helped the team win the UEFA Champions League in 2005–06. Since June 2022, he has been the assistant manager of Lyon.

== Club career ==
=== Early life ===
Giuly was immersed in the world of football from an early age since his father, Dominique Giuly, born in the village of Zalana, in Corsica, was a former goalkeeper, who played briefly in professional football for Bastia before continuing an amateur career until the age of 32 with several clubs in the suburbs of Lyon. Ludovic Giuly made his debut in the club in which his father was then active: the ASCMO, now known as Monts d'Or Azergues Foot, in the city of Chasselay, located about twenty kilometers from Lyon. He then entered the training center of Olympique Lyonnais. In 1994, he won the Coupe Gambardella with their U18 team.

=== Lyon ===
Giuly began his career with Lyon in 1994 at age 18, and made his debut for the club in a Division 1 match on 21 January 1995 against Cannes; a 3–1 win. The following season, Giuly earned the nickname "the magic elf", referring to his low height (1.64 metres) and his vivacious character. In the 1996–97 season, Giuly finished the season with 16 goals in 37 matches. During the 1997–98 season, he played 19 matches with Lyon and scored one goal. He made his last appearance for Lyon on 10 January 1998 in a 1–0 loss against Marseille, where he played 90 minutes.

=== AS Monaco ===
Giuly was signed by Monaco in the winter break in January 1998. The transfer fee was €7.5 million (£6.6 million), although the fee was then assessed at 42 million francs, which was a considerable sum at that time.

Just ten days after playing for Lyon against Marseille, Giuly made his Monaco debut against them in a 1–1 draw on 20 January 1998. Giuly scored his first goal for Monaco in a 5–2 win over Bordeaux in May 1998, on the final day of Ligue 1. In his first half-season with Monaco, he made a total of 12 appearances, scoring once.

In the 1999–2000 season, Giuly proved to be a key member in the Monaco squad on its right side, as he led his team to the Ligue 1 title for the first time since 1997. The next season turned out to be a troublesome campaign, after Monaco finished in 11th place in the league. Giuly scored 7 goals in 30 appearances. In the 2001–02 season, Giuly started strongly with two goals against Paris Saint-Germain and Lens respectively, before he suffered ruptured ligaments in his right knee which kept him sidelined for almost the entire season and spoiled his chances of playing in the 2002 FIFA World Cup.

The 2002–03 season was decisive for Giuly. He made his return from injury in a match against Troyes in a 4–0 win on 3 August 2003. In the 2003 Coupe de la Ligue final between Monaco and Sochaux, Giuly captained the side and scored a brace in a 4–1 win to win the Coupe de la Ligue for the first time in the club's history. His good performance at Monaco led him being selected in the FIFA Confederations Cup which France won.

At the start of the 2003–04 season – Giuly's last with Monaco – he scored a superb overhead kick during a league match against Lens with an assist from Jérôme Rothen, having suffered an injury that kept him out for a week prior to the game. While the club floundered in the race for the Ligue 1 title, they had a fantastic run in the UEFA Champions League progressing through the group stage (where Giuly scored goals at home to AEK Athens and Deportivo de La Coruña) and making it through to the knockout stage. Here, Monaco eliminated Lokomotiv Moscow, Real Madrid (in which he scored a brace in the second leg) and Chelsea. Giuly captained Monaco in the final, where they lost 3–0 to José Mourinho's Porto. This was a particularly galling defeat for Giuly because he suffered a groin injury early in the match, forcing him to leave the field in the 23rd minute, being replaced by Dado Pršo. Without Giuly, the club's task of winning the final was even more compromised. Even manager Didier Deschamps admitted that losing Giuly was a "big blow" and said, "Giuly's injury was not good news for us – he is a very important player for us on the offensive side." This was Giuly's last appearance for Monaco.

=== Barcelona ===
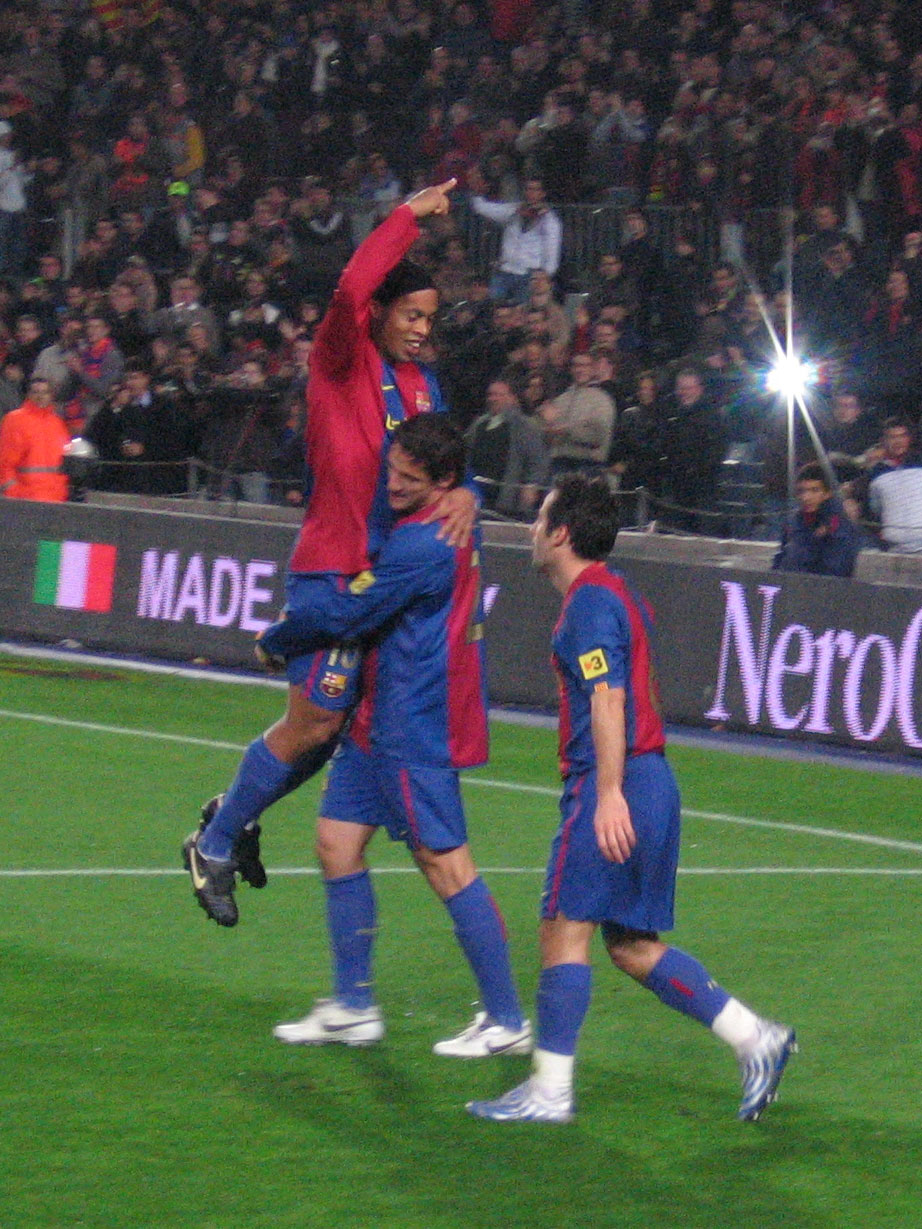
Giuly celebrating a goal against Real Sociedad with Ronaldinho and Juliano Belletti.

Barcelona paid about €7 million to Monaco in order to sign Giuly on 28 June 2004, with Giuly signing a three-year contract. On 29 August 2004, Giuly scored on his Barcelona debut against Racing de Santander in a 2–0 win and played 90 minutes. On his move, Giuly was happy after enjoying a successful start to life in Spain.

Giuly helped Barcelona to win La Liga in the 2004–05 season, ending a six-year championship drought. He was the second top scorer for the club with 11 goals. Although his season was disrupted by several muscle injuries, Giuly was able to fulfil his promise to reach double digits in goals in his first year at his new club.

In 2005–06, he helped win the Spanish title again, as well as capture the second UEFA Champions League trophy for the Catalan club. Giuly propelled Barça into the Champions League final by scoring the only goal in their semi-final against Milan. After the match, Giuly said he had called on his teammates to keep calm and finish the job: "Ronnie passed me the perfect ball. I attempted a shot from the left, the ball went in, so much the better! Now we've got one foot in the final, we have to remain cool and work hard to try and go all the way."

Giuly played the full 90 minutes in Paris as Barcelona came from a goal behind to defeat Arsenal 2–1 at the Stade de France. Giuly subsequently scored, but the goal was ruled out due to the foul resulting Jens Lehmann sending off (making him the first player and only goalkeeper to ever be sent off in a Champions League/European Cup final). FIFA president Sepp Blatter later said he believed Giuly's goal should have stood.

In the 2006–07 season, Giuly, although still a key member of the Barça squad, eventually lost his starting spot in the team, when Lionel Messi was promoted from the club's youth ranks. This resulted in Giuly saying his farewell to Barcelona.

=== Roma ===
On 17 July 2007, Giuly signed for Roma on a three-year deal after the club paid a £2.2 million transfer fee to Barça. A month later, Giuly won his first trophy with his new club, winning the Supercoppa Italiana against Internazionale (0–1). On 26 August 2007, he made his Serie A debut for Roma in a 2–0 win over Palermo. The next match, on 2 September, Giuly scored his first goal in a 3–0 win over Siena. In the UEFA Champions League group stage, Giuly scored and provided assist for Mirko Vučinić in a 4–1 win over Ukrainian side Dynamo Kyiv on 27 November. In the second leg of the round of 16 in the Coppa Italia, he also scored and provided two assists for Mancini and Roma fan favourite Francesco Totti in a 4–0 win over Torino on 16 January 2008.

However, Giuly's only season at Roma had him scoring more than many starting players which made him in the top five scorers at the club for the season he spent at Stadio Olimpico.

=== Paris Saint-Germain ===
Desiring to return to France for more playing time, Giuly was coveted by Monaco, Marseille and Lyon, but on 18 July 2008, he signed with Paris Saint-Germain on a three-year contract, with PSG paying a reported €2.5 million transfer fee to Roma. On 9 August 2008, he made his PSG debut against former club Monaco in a 1–0 loss. After an early season goal drought, marked by injury, he scored his first goal for PSG during their 1–0 win over Lille on 10 November. He scored his second goal against Le Havre and lead the team to a victory against Lyon, scoring a header against his first club. He scored his first brace of the season on 7 February 2009 against Nantes. In his first season at the club, PSG had moderate success in Ligue 1, finishing in sixth place and narrowly missing out on European play due to inferior goal difference.

In his second season (2009–10), PSG's league form was much worse and they finished in 13th place. He scored the first goal for the Parisian team against Montpellier (1–1) on the first day of the championship and scored again in their second fixture against Le Mans, as well as in their fifth fixture, against Lyon. That season, PSG won the Coupe de France, defeating his former team Monaco in the final.

In his third and final season (2010–11), Giuly began by scoring in play-off round of the UEFA Europa League, away at Maccabi Tel Aviv. In Ligue 1, PSG pushed up in the league table, especially after the arrival of winger Nenê, who had transferred in the summer of 2010. On 27 October 2010, Giuly scored against Lyon in Coupe de la Ligue, allowing PSG to win the match 2–1. Giuly scored four goals in the league that season, against Montpellier, Brest, Sochaux and Nice, and also made eight assists. On 29 June 2011, Giuly's contract with PSG was not renewed upon expiry.

=== Return to Monaco ===
Giuly spent the summer of 2011 training with his former club Monaco. On 9 August 2011, he signed a two-year contract with the club, then playing in Ligue 2. His move back to Monaco was a surprise to the Monegasque supporters, though the club's goal was to return to Ligue 1 within the year. He got back the number 8 shirt he wore during his first spell at the club. A negotiated reconversion within the club was included in the contract. In his first match, the club lost 1–2 against Stade de Reims. On 29 August 2011, Guily scored his first goal in over seven years at Monaco in a 2–2 draw against Lens. On 14 January 2012, Giuly scored his second goal in a 1–0 win over Istres. On 13 April, he scored his third goal in a 2–0 win over Metz. Upon his return, he established himself in the starting eleven throughout the season.

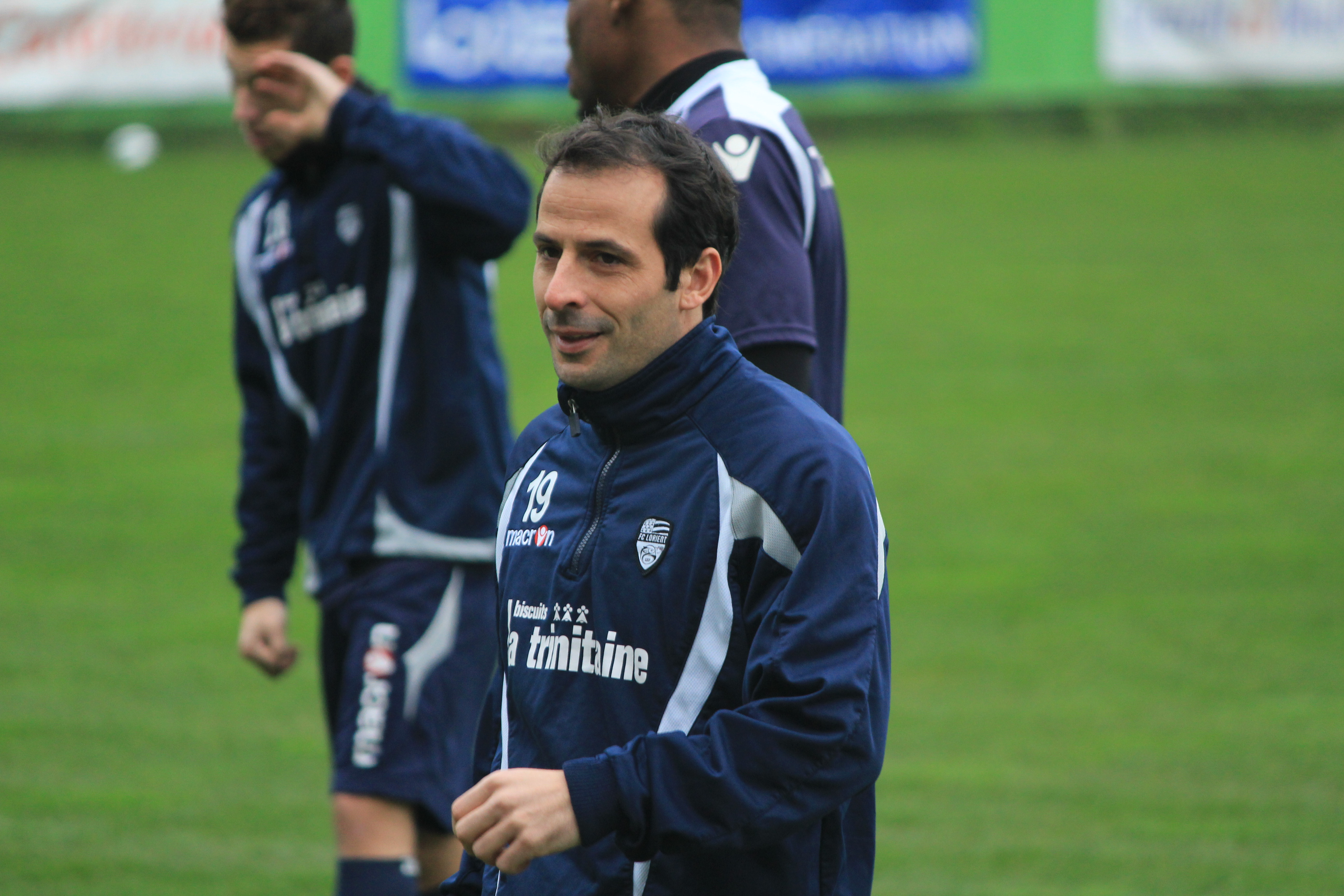
Giuly in training with Lorient in 2013

Ahead of the 2012–13 season, Giuly found himself being frozen out of the first team by newly appointed manager Claudio Ranieri and lost the captaincy to Andreas Wolf. On 27 July 2012, Giuly left Monaco by mutual consent after just one year. In a friendly match against Tours, the club hosted a ceremony in his honour. Giuly said, "Monaco has allowed me to express the best years my life as a footballer. I want to thank the leaders for the conditions in which I ended my adventure with the ASMFC."

=== Lorient ===
On 31 July 2012, Giuly signed for Lorient on a one-year contract on a free transfer. Giuly made his debut, coming on as a substitute for Yann Jouffre, in a 2–1 win over Montpellier and two weeks later, on 1 September 2012, Giuly scored his first goal for the club, in a 3–0 win over Nancy. Then, four months later, in the second round of Coupe de France, Giuly scored his last career goal, in a 1–0 win over Sedan.

Towards the end of the season, on 11 May 2013, Giuly announced his retirement. Giuly ended his professional career on 26 May 2013 in a home match against his former club Paris Saint-Germain, in the final round of the season. Giuly left the pitch in the 72nd minute to standing ovations, and was even awarded a shirt with his old number by the visitors. His last appearance was also his 401st appearance in Ligue 1.

=== Monts d'Or Azergues Foot ===
Following his retirement, Giuly joined Monts d'Or Azergues Foot, a fourth-tier team based near Lyon; the team is a successor to Chasselay, where he started his career. On 4 January 2014, he inspired his team to a penalty shootout win over Ligue 2 side Istres in the Coupe de France.

== International career ==
Giuly has been capped for France on 17 occasions between 2000 and 2005. He was a member of their 2003 FIFA Confederations Cup-winning squad, starting in the 1–0 final victory over Cameroon in Paris.

Although he was initially stated to play at UEFA Euro 2004, he was removed from his country's squad due to a leg injury he sustained in the 2004 Champions League final.

Giuly was not selected for the French 2006 FIFA World Cup squad, as young Marseille playmaker Franck Ribéry was selected over him. However, with Djibril Cissé having broken his leg in a World Cup warm-up match against China, Giuly could have been called up, but he asserted after the initial France squad was announced that he would go on holiday to Dubai and Kish instead of waiting idly in the stand-by squad, and Sidney Govou was called up instead. Despite this, France head coach Raymond Domenech opened a door for Giuly whether he wanted to play for the national team.

Giuly also qualified for the non-FIFA affiliated team of Corsica, having been called up for their 31 May 2011 friendly with Bulgaria.

== Personal life ==
On 15 May 2007, Giuly's autobiography "Giuly by Giuly" was published by Hugo & Co. In the autobiography, Giuly settles accounts with former France coach Raymond Domenech, including revelations about his alleged affair with Domenech's partner Estelle Denis.

From September 2006 to March 2007, Giuly worked as a columnist each Thursday in Luis Attaque on Radio Monte Carlo (RMC). In 2010, he incorporated Ultimate Player, a service company for professional footballers. The company employs 40 people.

Giuly tested positive for the H1N1 (Swine flu) virus in October 2009 along with two PSG teammates, Jérémy Clément and Mamadou Sakho. This led to the league postponing Marseille's match with Paris St Germain.

In January 2013, Monts d'Or Azergues Foot named their home stadium after Giuly as the Stade Ludovic Giuly.

== Career statistics ==
=== Club ===
Appearances and goals by club, season and competition
Club	Season	League			National cup (Note: Includes Coupe de France, Copa del Rey, Coppa Italia)		League cup (Note: Includes Coupe de la Ligue)		Europe		Other		Total	
Club	Season	Division	Apps	Goals	Apps	Goals	Apps	Goals	Apps	Goals	Apps	Goals	Apps	Goals
Lyon	1994–95	Division 1	8	0	1	1	2	0	—		—		11	1
Lyon	1995–96	Division 1	36	4	1	0	5	3	6 (Note: Appearances in UEFA Cup)	1	—		48	8
Lyon	1996–97	Division 1	37	16	2	0	2	1	—		—		41	17
Lyon	1997–98	Division 1	19	1	0	0	1	0	11 (Note: Seven appearances and two goals in UEFA Intertoto Cup, four appearances and three goals in UEFA Cup)	5	—		31	6
Lyon	Total		100	21	4	1	10	4	17	6	—		131	32
Monaco	1997–98	Division 1	12	1	4	0	—		—		—		16	1
Monaco	1998–99	Division 1	32	8	1	0	1	0	6	2	—		40	10
Monaco	1999–2000	Division 1	33	5	5	1	2	1	7	2	—		47	9
Monaco	2000–01	Division 1	30	7	1	0	4	0	6 (Note: Appearances in UEFA Champions League)	0	1 (Note: Appearance in Trophée des Champions)	0	42	7
Monaco	2001–02	Division 1	11	2	0	0	0	0	—		—		11	2
Monaco	2002–03	Ligue 1	36	11	1	0	4	3	—		—		41	14
Monaco	2003–04	Ligue 1	30	13	2	1	0	0	10	4	—		42	18
Monaco	Total		184	47	14	2	11	4	29	8	1	0	239	61
Barcelona	2004–05	La Liga	29	11	1	0	—		6	1	—		36	12
Barcelona	2005–06	La Liga	29	5	3	1	—		8	1	2 (Note: Appearances in Supercopa de España)	1	42	8
Barcelona	2006–07	La Liga	27	3	7	0	—		8	2	4 (Note: One appearance and one goal in Supercopa de España, one appearance in UEFA Super Cup, one appearance in FIFA Club World Cup)	1	46	6
Barcelona	Total		85	19	11	1	—		22	4	6	2	124	26
Roma	2007–08	Serie A	32	6	6	1	—		9	1	1 (Note: Appearance in Supercoppa Italiana)	0	48	8
Paris Saint-Germain	2008–09	Ligue 1	34	9	3	0	1	0	4	0	—		42	9
Paris Saint-Germain	2009–10	Ligue 1	31	3	6	1	1	0	—		—		38	4
Paris Saint-Germain	2010–11	Ligue 1	35	4	2	0	2	1	5 (Note: Appearances in UEFA Europa League)	1	1	0	45	6
Paris Saint-Germain	Total		100	16	11	1	4	1	9	1	1	0	125	19
Monaco	2011–12	Ligue 2	27	3	2	2	0	0	—		—		29	5
Lorient	2012–13	Ligue 1	17	1	2	1	1	0	—		—		20	2
Monts d'Or Azergues	2013–14	CFA	17	4	2	1	—		—		—		19	5
Monts d'Or Azergues	2014–15	CFA	19	11	1	2	—		—		—		20	13
Monts d'Or Azergues	Total		36	15	3	3	—		—		—		39	18
Career total			581	128	53	12	26	9	86	20	9	2	755	171

=== International ===
Appearances and goals by national team and year

National team	Year	Apps	Goals
France	2000	3	0
France	2001	0	0
France	2002	1	0
France	2003	5	1
France	2004	4	1
France	2005	4	1
Total		17	3

International goals

Giuly – goals for France
#	Date	Venue	Opponent	Score	Result	Competition
1.	22 June 2003	Stade de France, Saint-Denis, France	New Zealand	4–0	5–0	2003 Confederations Cup
2.	8 September 2004	Tórsvøllur, Tórshavn, Faroe Islands	Faroe Islands	1–0	2–0	2006 World Cup qualifier
3.	12 October 2005	Stade de France, Saint-Denis, France	Cyprus	4–0	4–0	2006 World Cup qualifier

== Honours ==
Lyon

- UEFA Intertoto Cup: 1997

Monaco

- Division 1: 1999–2000
- Coupe de la Ligue: 2002–03
- Trophée des Champions: 2000
- UEFA Champions League runner-up: 2003–04

Barcelona

- La Liga: 2004–05, 2005–06
- Supercopa de España: 2005, 2006
- UEFA Champions League: 2005–06

Roma

- Coppa Italia: 2007–08
- Supercoppa Italiana: 2007

Paris Saint-Germain

- Coupe de France: 2009–10

France

- FIFA Confederations Cup: 2003

Individual

- Etoile d'Or: 2002–03
- UNFP Ligue 1 Team of the Year: 2002–03, 2003–04
- UNFP Ligue 1 Player of the Month: September 2003, November 2003
- ESM Team of the Year: 2003–04
