= Philippe Léonard =

Belgian footballer

Personal information
- Date of birth: 14 February 1974 (age 52)
- Place of birth: Liège, Belgium
- Height: 1.85 m (6 ft 1 in)
- Position: Left-back

Senior career*
Years	Team	Apps	(Gls)
1992–1996	Standard Liège	124	(3)
1996–2003	Monaco	99	(3)
2004	Nice	14	(0)
2004–2006	Standard Liège	55	(3)
2006–2007	Feyenoord	2	(0)
2008	Rapid București	10	(0)
Total		304	(9)

International career
1991	Belgium U19	2	(0)
1992–1995	Belgium U21	9	(1)
1994–2006	Belgium	26	(0)
- * Club domestic league appearances and goals

Philippe Léonard (born 14 February 1974) is a Belgian former professional footballer who played as a left-back.

After playing most notably for Standard Liège and Monaco, he rarely appeared for his following four teams (including Standard again) in a 16-year professional career.

Léonard represented Belgium at Euro 2000, being an international over a 12-year period.

== Club career ==
Born in Liège, Léonard started his professional career at Standard Liège. There, alongside Régis Genaux and Michaël Goossens, he was part of The Three Musketeers generation – with Roberto Bisconti playing a smaller role – hailed for their sporting talent but with a troublesome character.

He won the Belgian Cup in 1993, only 19, having scored in the final against Charleroi, and also helped the side to two runner-up league places (1992–93 and 1994–95), each time bowing out to Anderlecht.

Subsequently, Léonard moved to France where he played with Monaco, also having a brief stint with Nice. Whilst at Monaco, he scored in the semifinal of the 1997–98 UEFA Champions League against Juventus, in a 6–4 aggregate loss, being the only Belgian player to score at this stage of the competition; in the previous round, he helped oust Manchester United on the away goals rule after a 1–1 draw at Old Trafford.

After two Ligue 1 titles with Monaco, to which he contributed with 38 games and two goals combined, Léonard returned to Standard, where he again finished second, in the 2005–06 season, again to Anderlecht. Subsequently, he had short spells abroad, with Feyenoord and Rapid București.

Léonard ended his career in 2009, at the age of 35, after not being able to find a new club. He subsequently took up writing columns in Belgian newspapers.

== International career ==
Léonard played 26 times with Belgium, and was in the team for UEFA Euro 2000, where he appeared in the 2–1 win for the hosts against Sweden. His debut coming in 1994, he was a regular fixture in the next two years, as right back Genaux, but Belgium failed to qualify for Euro 1996.

They both lost their place with the arrival of coach Georges Leekens, and Léonard was dropped at the last minute for the 1998 FIFA World Cup. Because of a conflict with then coach Robert Waseige, he spent five years without being called after Euro 2000, so he also missed the 2002 World Cup in Japan and South Korea.

== Honours ==
Standard Liège

- Belgian Cup: 1992–93

Monaco

- Ligue 1: 1996–97, 1999–2000
- Coupe de la Ligue: 2002–03; runner-up 2000–01
- Trophée des Champions: 1997, 2000
