= Sabri Lamouchi =

Football manager (born 1971)

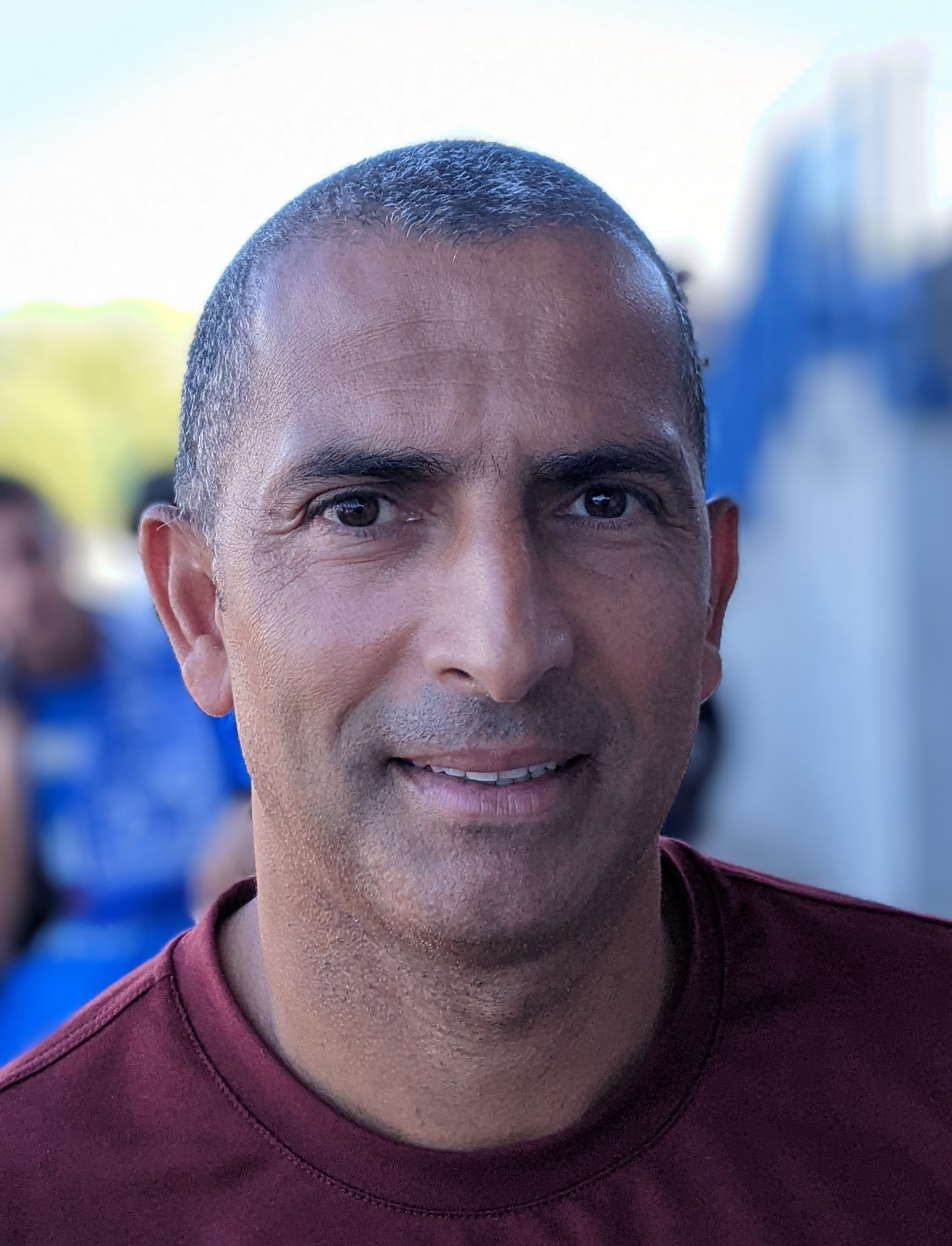
- Lamouchi in 2022

Personal information
- Full name: Sabri Lamouchi
- Date of birth: 9 November 1971 (age 55)
- Place of birth: Lyon, France
- Height: 1.75 m (5 ft 9 in)
- Position: Midfielder

Youth career
- 1977–1982: AS Lyon-Duchère
- 1982–1989: Cascol Oullins

Senior career*
Years	Team	Apps	(Gls)
1990–1994	Alès	106	(26)
1994–1998	Auxerre	129	(19)
1998–2000	Monaco	56	(4)
2000–2003	Parma	90	(7)
2003–2005	Inter Milan	16	(0)
2004–2005	→ Genoa (loan)	20	(1)
2005–2006	Marseille	37	(5)
2006–2007	Al-Rayyan	13	(10)
2007–2008	Umm-Salal	10	(1)
2009	Al-Kharitiyath	29	(9)
Total		506	(92)

International career
1996–2001	France	12	(1)

Managerial career
- 2012–2014: Ivory Coast
- 2014–2017: El Jaish
- 2017–2018: Rennes
- 2019–2020: Nottingham Forest
- 2020–2021: Al-Duhail
- 2023: Cardiff City
- 2024–2025: Al-Riyadh
- 2025: Al-Diriyah
- 2026: Tunisia
- * Club domestic league appearances and goals

Sabri Lamouchi (born 9 November 1971) is a French professional football manager and former player, who was most recently the head coach of the Tunisia national football team.

During his playing career as a midfielder, Lamouchi played for clubs in France, Italy, and Qatar. He appeared 12 times for the France national team, scoring once.

== Early life ==
Lamouchi was born in Lyon, France, to Tunisian parents, and was raised in France. He holds French and Tunisian citizenship.

== Club career ==
Lamouchi started his professional career with Alès and then moved to Auxerre for four years. He then went on to join Monaco, who he helped to the Ligue 1 title in 2000, before being snapped up by Parma of Italy. He later moved to Inter Milan.

Lamouchi had a spell at Genoa before joining Marseille on loan the following year. In January 2006, the loan deal was made a permanent move. He played for Marseille for six further months, until he announced that he was leaving the club on 18 September 2006, although his contract ran until June 2007.

In 2006, Lamouchi moved to Al-Rayyan in the Qatar Stars League, where he scored a spectacular goal in his first match. The next season, he joined Umm-Salal.

In January 2009, Lamouchi transferred to Al-Kharitiyath.

== International career ==
Sabri Lamouchi holds Tunisian and French nationalities by birth since he was born in France before 1994 to parents born in French protectorate of Tunisia before its independence. Lamouchi was capped 12 times and scored one goal for the France national team. He made his debut in 1996 and was a member of the French European Championship squad the same year. He was in France's 28 men-preliminary squad for the 1998 FIFA World Cup on home soil. However he was one of the six players axed by head coach Aimé Jacquet just before the tournament began. The team went on to win the tournament.

== Managerial career ==
=== Ivory Coast ===
In May 2012, he became manager of the Ivory Coast national team, his first managerial position. The Elephants qualified for the 2014 FIFA World Cup, ranked 23rd at the time – highest ranked in Africa – and started their group play with a 2–1 victory over Japan. That was followed by a 2–1 loss to group favourite Colombia. On his last game as Ivory Coast's manager, he and his team lost 2–1 against Greece and they were eliminated from the FIFA World Cup. The team featured stars such as Yaya Touré, Gervinho, Wilfried Bony and Didier Drogba. Lamouchi resigned from the position following Les Elephants' exit from the competition.

=== Rennes ===
On 8 November 2017, Lamouchi became the manager of French side Rennes. He led the team to a 5th place synonymous with Europa League qualification. On 3 December 2018 after a string of poor results, he was sacked from the club.

=== Nottingham Forest ===
==== 2019–20 season ====
On 28 June 2019, following the departure of Martin O'Neill, it was announced that Lamouchi would become head coach of Nottingham Forest for the 2019–20 season. He enjoyed a strong start to the season and won the league's Manager of the Month award for September 2019. On 19 June 2020, Nottingham Forest announced that Lamouchi had signed an extension to his managerial contract. Forest were in the play-off positions for nearly the whole season, but missed out by finishing seventh on the final day of the season after being beaten at home 1–4 by Stoke City. Lamouchi had guided Forest to their highest league position since the 2010–11 season, and also became the first Forest manager to complete a full season in over nine years.

==== 2020–21 season ====
Following Forest's disappointing end to the season, Lamouchi flew to Athens to meet with the Forest board, including Forest owner Evangelos Marinakis, where it was decided that Lamouchi would remain as Forest's Head Coach. To improve on the shortcomings of the previous season, four new additions were made to Lamouchi's coaching staff, along with a change in transfer strategy that would place a greater focus on domestic signings.

On 5 September 2020, Nottingham Forest were knocked out of the League Cup in a 1–0 defeat to Barnsley. In a video call to the squad following that game, Marinakis described the result as a 'humiliation' to the football club that Forest would lose twice to a club that had barely survived relegation the previous season. It was clear that Marinakis' patience with Lamouchi was running out, and Marinakis angrily told Albert Adomah and João Carvalho that they could leave the club without consulting Lamouchi.

On 6 October 2020, Lamouchi's contract was terminated and he was immediately replaced by Chris Hughton. Forest had lost all five competitive games of the new season, and had failed to win in their last eleven games.

=== Al-Duhail ===
In October 2020, Lamouchi was appointed manager of Qatari side Al-Duhail. On 9 August 2021, his contract was terminated by mutual consent.

=== Cardiff City ===
On 27 January 2023, Lamouchi returned to British football when he was appointed as manager of Welsh club Cardiff City. Despite successfully helping the team steer clear of relegation at the end of the 2022–23 season, on 16 May 2023, Cardiff City announced that Lamouchi would leave the club at the end of his contract.

=== Saudi Arabia ===
On 12 July 2024, Lamouchi was appointed manager of Saudi Pro League club Al-Riyadh. He was sacked on 19 April 2025.

On 20 July 2025, Lamouchi was appointed as manager of Saudi First Division League club Al-Diriyah. He was sacked on 6 December 2025.

=== Tunisia ===
On 14 January 2026, the Tunisian Football Federation announced an agreement with Lamouchi to coach the Tunisia national team on a contract extending until 31 July 2028. However, he was dismissed on 15 June after just five games, the day after Tunisia's 5–1 defeat to Sweden in their opening match at the 2026 FIFA World Cup in Monterrey, Mexico.

== Managerial statistics ==
As of 16 June 2026

Managerial record by team and tenure
Team	Nat.	From	To	Record					Ref.
Team	Nat.	From	To	G	W	D	L	Win %	Ref.
Ivory Coast	(Ivory Coast)	28 May 2012	25 June 2014	28	14	7	7	50.00	
El Jaish	(Qatar)	27 December 2014	1 July 2017	92	50	16	26	54.35	
Rennes	(France)	8 November 2017	3 December 2018	50	19	13	18	38.00	
Nottingham Forest	(England)	28 June 2019	6 October 2020	55	20	16	19	36.36	
Al-Duhail	(Qatar)	14 October 2020	9 August 2021	37	21	5	11	56.76	
Cardiff City	(Wales)	27 January 2023	16 May 2023	18	6	2	10	33.33	
Al-Riyadh	(Saudi Arabia)	12 July 2024	19 April 2025	30	10	7	13	33.33	
Al-Diriyah	(Saudi Arabia)	20 July 2025	6 December 2025	10	6	3	1	60.00	
Tunisia	(Tunisia)	14 January 2026	16 June 2026	5	1	1	3	20.00	
Career Total				325	147	70	108	45.23	

== Honours ==
=== Player ===
Auxerre

- Division 1: 1995–96
- Coupe de France: 1995–96

Monaco

- Division 1: 1999–2000

Parma

- Coppa Italia: 2001–02

Marseille

- UEFA Intertoto Cup: 2005

=== Manager ===
El Jaish

- Qatar Crown Prince Cup: 2016

Individual

- EFL Championship Manager of the Month: September 2019, January 2020
