= Philippe Christanval =

French footballer (born 1978)

Personal information
- Full name: Philippe Charles Lucien Christanval
- Date of birth: 31 August 1978 (age 48)
- Place of birth: Paris, France
- Height: 1.85 m (6 ft 1 in)
- Position: Centre-back

Youth career
- 1993–1994: Sarcelles
- 1994–1997: Monaco
- 1992–1995: Clairefontaine

Senior career*
Years	Team	Apps	(Gls)
1997–2001	Monaco	81	(1)
2001–2003	Barcelona	31	(0)
2003–2005	Marseille	13	(0)
2005–2008	Fulham	36	(1)
Total		161	(2)

International career
1998–1999	France U21	16	(1)
2000–2002	France	6	(0)
- * Club domestic league appearances and goals

Philippe Charles Lucien Christanval (born 31 August 1978) is a French former professional footballer who played as a centre-back. During his career, he played for Monaco, Barcelona, Marseille and Fulham and earned six full international caps with the France national team, as well as selection to the 2002 FIFA World Cup.

== Early life ==
Christanval was born in Paris.

== Club career ==
=== Monaco ===
Christanval's career began at AS Monaco in 1999, where he made 81 appearances, scoring one goal. They won the 1999–2000 league title, earning him the title of Young Player of the Year, and he made several UEFA Champions League appearances. In January 2001, it was reported that Monaco were considering exchanging him for Frank LeBoeuf of Chelsea.

=== Barcelona and Marseille ===
Christanval was then signed by Barcelona of Spain's La Liga for a £6.5 million fee in June 2001, the team he supported as a child. After being released from Barcelona in 2003, he joined Marseille on 18 July on a four-year contract. They reached the 2004 UEFA Cup Final in his first season, but he was an unused substitute as they lost 2–0 to Valencia.

=== Fulham ===
After two weeks on trial at Arsenal, their manager Arsène Wenger opted not to sign Christanval. He then joined another Premier League team from across London, Fulham, on 9 September 2005. Upon his signing, manager Chris Coleman stated:

"He can be captain for the next five years if he shows the same consistency and level of performance."

In his first appearances at Fulham, he found himself playing in defensive midfield with Papa Bouba Diop. He was later moved back to his typical position. His only Premier League goal was a late equaliser in a 3–3 draw with West Ham United on 13 January 2007.

In the 2007–08 season he made a single substitute appearance. At the end of the season, Christanval was released by Fulham and was offered a trial with Premier League club Blackburn Rovers. On 9 April 2009, Christanval retired from football, having been unable to find a new club.

== International career ==
Christanval was part of the France squad at the 1997 FIFA World Youth Championship.

He made his full debut on 7 October 2000, in a 0–0 friendly draw away to South Africa. Christanval played four more friendlies in 2002 before his last appearance, a 2–1 away win against Cyprus in qualification for UEFA Euro 2004. He was selected for the 2002 FIFA World Cup but did not enter the field of play.

== Personal life ==
An artificial pitch in his native Sarcelles was named after Christanval.

== Career statistics ==
Appearances and goals by club, season and competition
Club	Season	League			Cup (Note: Includes Coupe de France, Coupe de la Ligue, EFL Cup and FA Cup.)		Continental (Note: Includes UEFA Champions League and UEFA Cup.)		Total	
Club	Season	Division	Apps	Goals	Apps	Goals	Apps	Goals	Apps	Goals
Monaco	1996–97	Division 1	–		1	0	–		1	0
Monaco	1997–98	Division 1	10	0	2	0	3	0	15	0
Monaco	1998–99	Division 1	23	1	–		4	0	27	1
Monaco	1999–00	Division 1	25	0	4	0	7	0	36	0
Monaco	2000–01	Division 1	23	0	4	0	5	0	32	0
Monaco	Total		81	1	11	0	19	0	111	1
Barcelona	2001–02	Primera División	26	0	–		13	0	39	0
Barcelona	2002–03	Primera División	5	0	–		3	0	8	0
Barcelona	Total		31	0	0	0	16	0	47	0
Marseille	2003–04	Ligue 1	13	0	1	0	3	0	17	0
Fulham	2005–06	Premier League	15	0	4	0	–		19	0
Fulham	2006–07	Premier League	20	1	3	0	–		23	1
Fulham	2007–08	Premier League	1	0	–		–		1	0
Fulham	Total		36	1	7	0	0	0	43	1
Career total			161	2	19	0	38	0	218	2

== Honours ==
Monaco

- Division 1: 1999–2000
- Trophée des Champions: 2000

Marseille

- UEFA Cup runner-up: 2003–04

Individual

- UNFP Ligue 1 Young Player of the Year: 2000
