= Pascal Fugier =

French footballer (born 1968)

Personal information
- Full name: Pascal Fugier
- Date of birth: September 22, 1968 (age 58)
- Place of birth: Guilherand-Granges, France
- Position: Defender

Youth career
- 1982–1983: ASOA Valence
- 1983–1987: Olympique Lyonnais

Senior career*
Years	Team	Apps	(Gls)
1987–1993	Olympique Lyonnais	196	(3)
1993–1994	Olympique de Marseille	21	(1)
1994–1996	Stade Rennais FC	73	(1)
1996–2003	Montpellier HSC	183	(6)
- * Club domestic league appearances and goals

Pascal Fugier (born 22 September 1968) is a former football defender.

== Honours ==
Montpellier

- UEFA Intertoto Cup: 1999
