= Uliano Courville =

French association football player (born 1978)

Personal information
- Date of birth: 8 August 1978
- Place of birth: France
- Position(s): Midfielder

Senior career*
Years	Team	Apps	(Gls)
-2001	AS Monaco FC	5	(0)
1999-2000	→ AC Ajaccio (loan)	30	(0)
2001/2002	Portsmouth F.C.	0	(0)
- FC Mantois 78
	Rapid de Menton	2+	(1+)
- *Club domestic league appearances and goals

Uliano Courville (born 8 August 1978) is a French retired footballer.

== Career ==
Courville started his career with AS Monaco in the French Ligue 1, where he made 5 league appearances.

In 2001, Courville signed for English first division side Portsmouth, where he failed to make an appearance. After that, he joined French lower league club Mantois 78, where he was given a 6-month ban due to substance use.
