= Jean-Marie Aubry =

French footballer (born 1969)

Personal information
- Date of birth: 3 April 1969 (age 57)
- Place of birth: Forbach, France
- Height: 1.76 m (5 ft 9 in)
- Position: Goalkeeper

Senior career*
Years	Team	Apps	(Gls)
1987–1988	RC Strasbourg	2	(0)
1988–1995	Angers SCO	148	(0)
1995–1998	Lille	100	(0)
1998–2001	Monaco	17	(0)
2001–2003	Caen	40	(0)
Total		306	(0)

International career
2004–2009	France Beach Soccer		
- * Club domestic league appearances and goals

Jean-Marie Aubry (born 3 April 1969) is a French retired footballer. He currently plays for the French national Beach Football Team.
