= Renaud Connen =

French football midfielder (born 1980)

Personal information
- Date of birth: 21 March 1980 (age 46)
- Place of birth: Melun, France
- Height: 1.73 m (5 ft 8 in)
- Position: Midfielder

Senior career*
Years	Team	Apps	(Gls)
1999–2000	AS Monaco	?	(?)
2000–05	AC Ajaccio	86	(1)
2005–06	Grenoble Foot	30	(2)
2006–2007	AC Ajaccio	1	(0)

International career
2006–2007	Monaco	?	(?)
- * Club domestic league appearances and goals as of December 31, 2006

Renaud Connen (born 21 March 1980) is a French former footballer who played as a midfielder. He represented Monaco in unofficial international matches.
