= 1999–2000 French Division 1 =

62nd season of French Division 1

Division 1
- Season: 1999–2000
- Dates: 30 July 1999 – 13 May 2000
- Champions: Monaco (7th title)
- Relegated: Nancy; Le Havre; Montpellier
- Matches: 306
- Goals: 787 (2.57 per match)
- Best player: Marcelo Gallardo
- Top goalscorer: Sonny Anderson (23 goals)

The 1999–2000 Ligue 1 season (then called Division 1) was the 62nd since its establishment. AS Monaco won the French Association Football League with 65 points.

== Participating teams ==
- Auxerre
- Bastia
- Bordeaux
- Le Havre
- RC Lens
- Olympique Lyonnais
- Olympique de Marseille
- FC Metz
- AS Monaco
- Montpellier HSC
- AS Nancy
- FC Nantes Atlantique
- Paris Saint-Germain FC
- Stade Rennais FC
- AS Saint-Étienne
- Sedan
- RC Strasbourg
- Troyes AC
Location of teams in 1999–2000 Ligue 1

== League table ==
Pos	Team	Pld	W	D	L	GF	GA	GD	Pts	Qualification or relegation
1	Monaco (C)	34	20	5	9	69	38	+31	65	Qualification to Champions League first group stage
2	Paris Saint-Germain	34	16	10	8	54	40	+14	58	Qualification to Champions League first group stage
3	Lyon	34	16	8	10	45	42	+3	56	Qualification to Champions League third qualifying round
4	Bordeaux	34	15	9	10	52	40	+12	54	Qualification to UEFA Cup first round
5	Lens	34	14	7	13	42	41	+1	49	Qualification to Intertoto Cup third round
6	Saint-Étienne	34	13	9	12	46	47	−1	48	
7	Sedan	34	13	9	12	43	44	−1	48	Qualification to Intertoto Cup second round
8	Auxerre	34	13	8	13	37	39	−2	47	Qualification to Intertoto Cup second round
9	Strasbourg	34	13	7	14	42	52	−10	46	
10	Bastia	34	11	12	11	43	39	+4	45	
11	Metz	34	9	17	8	38	33	+5	44	
12	Nantes	34	12	7	15	39	40	−1	43	Qualification to UEFA Cup first round (Note: Nantes was qualified for the 2000–01 UEFA Cup as winners of the 1999–2000 Coupe de France.)
13	Rennes	34	12	7	15	44	48	−4	43	
14	Troyes	34	13	4	17	36	52	−16	43	
15	Marseille	34	9	15	10	45	45	0	42	
16	Nancy (R)	34	11	9	14	43	45	−2	42	Relegation to French Division 2
17	Le Havre (R)	34	9	7	18	30	52	−22	34	Relegation to French Division 2
18	Montpellier (R)	34	7	10	17	39	50	−11	31	Relegation to French Division 2

Source: Ligue 1
Rules for classification: 1) points; 2) goal difference; 3) number of goals scored.
(C) Champions; (R) Relegated
Notes:

Promoted from Ligue 2, who will play in 2000–01 French Division 1

- Lille OSC: champion of Ligue 2
- EA Guingamp: runners-up
- Toulouse FC: third place

== Results ==
Home \ Away	AUX	BAS	BOR	LHA	RCL	OL	OM	MET	ASM	MHS	NAL	NAN	PSG	REN	STE	SED	STR	TRO
Auxerre		3–1	1–0	2–1	3–2	2–0	2–2	1–1	0–2	2–1	2–1	1–1	1–0	4–0	2–1	3–1	0–1	0–1
Bastia	2–0		1–1	1–1	2–0	3–0	0–0	0–0	1–0	1–0	1–1	2–1	1–2	4–2	4–0	1–0	3–0	5–0
Bordeaux	1–0	3–2		3–0	1–2	1–3	2–1	0–0	3–2	2–0	2–1	3–0	1–1	1–0	1–2	1–1	3–0	4–0
Le Havre	0–0	2–2	3–0		1–1	0–1	0–0	1–0	1–4	2–1	0–1	0–1	3–1	0–1	1–0	2–1	0–1	2–0
Lens	2–1	4–0	3–3	4–0		4–3	0–0	1–0	1–0	1–0	0–1	1–2	3–2	1–1	0–2	0–3	3–0	0–1
Lyon	0–0	2–1	1–1	3–0	1–0		2–0	2–0	2–1	1–2	2–1	2–0	1–0	2–2	0–0	2–0	0–0	1–3
Marseille	0–1	1–1	0–2	2–0	1–2	0–1		1–1	4–2	0–0	2–2	1–1	4–1	1–1	3–3	3–0	4–1	1–0
Metz	3–0	1–1	2–1	3–0	0–0	0–1	2–0		1–1	2–2	2–2	2–1	1–3	0–0	1–1	1–1	0–0	3–1
Monaco	2–0	4–0	1–0	5–2	2–0	1–0	1–1	2–2		1–0	2–2	2–0	1–0	3–1	2–2	2–1	3–0	3–0
Montpellier	2–0	1–1	2–2	0–0	1–1	2–2	3–1	0–1	2–3		1–0	3–0	0–1	1–2	0–1	1–1	1–1	2–2
Nancy	2–0	1–0	2–2	3–0	2–1	1–0	2–2	0–0	1–2	1–2		2–1	1–1	3–0	1–0	0–2	2–3	1–2
Nantes	3–1	1–1	0–1	1–0	0–1	6–1	0–0	1–3	0–3	3–0	2–0		0–4	3–0	0–1	1–0	3–1	3–0
Paris SG	1–1	2–0	2–1	2–1	4–1	2–2	0–2	2–1	0–3	3–0	1–1	0–0		1–0	2–0	3–2	4–2	1–0
Rennes	1–0	0–0	2–1	2–1	3–0	1–2	1–2	2–0	2–1	1–3	3–1	0–0	1–3		4–1	5–0	2–1	2–2
Saint-Étienne	0–0	1–1	1–2	3–3	0–2	1–1	5–1	2–0	3–1	5–4	2–1	0–2	1–1	1–0		2–3	0–1	1–0
Sedan	1–1	2–0	0–1	0–1	0–0	2–0	2–2	0–2	2–1	2–1	3–1	0–0	1–1	2–1	3–2		2–1	2–1
Strasbourg	1–3	2–0	2–2	0–1	1–0	4–2	3–1	1–1	3–2	2–0	0–2	3–2	1–1	2–1	0–1	1–1		2–0
Troyes	2–0	1–0	2–0	3–1	0–1	1–2	1–2	2–2	1–4	2–1	2–0	1–0	2–2	1–0	0–1	0–2	2–1	

Source: Ligue 1
Legend: Blue = home team win; Yellow = draw; Red = away team win.

== Top goalscorers ==
Rank	Player	Club	Goals
1	(Brazil) Sonny Anderson	Lyon	23
2	(France) David Trezeguet	Monaco	22
3	(Italy) Marco Simone	Monaco	21
4	(Brazil) Christian Corrêa Dionisio	Paris Saint-Germain	16
4	(Democratic Republic of the Congo) Shabani Nonda	Rennes	16
6	(Republic of Ireland) Tony Cascarino	Nancy	15
6	(Brazil) Alex	Saint-Étienne	15
8	(France) Stéphane Guivarc'h	Auxerre	14
8	(France) Lilian Laslandes	Bordeaux	14
10	(France) Sylvain Wiltord	Bordeaux	13
10	(France) Antoine Sibierski	Nantes	13

== Awards ==
=== Individual awards ===
Award	Winner	Club
Ligue 1 Player of the Year	(Argentina) Marcelo Gallardo	Monaco
Ligue 1 Young Player of the Year	(France) Philippe Christanval	Monaco
Ligue 1 Manager of the Year	(France) Claude Puel	Monaco

Team of the Year
Goalkeeper	(France) Fabien Barthez (Monaco)			
Defenders	(France) Patrice Carteron (Lyon)	(France) Éric Rabésandratana (Paris Saint-Germain)	(Mexico) Rafael Márquez (Monaco)	(France) Jérôme Bonnissel (Bordeaux)
Midfielders	(France) Michel Pavon (Bordeaux)	(France) Sabri Lamouchi (Monaco)	(Argentina) Marcelo Gallardo (Monaco)	(France) Ludovic Giuly (Monaco)
Forwards	(Brazil) Sonny Anderson (Lyon)	(Italy) Marco Simone (Monaco)		

== Attendances ==
No.	Club	Average attendance	Change	Highest
1	Olympique de Marseille	51,918	1.0%	60,000
2	Paris Saint-Germain FC	43,185	5.6%	44,784
3	RC Lens	38,805	7.7%	41,000
4	Olympique lyonnais	35,456	20.0%	40,000
5	Girondins de Bordeaux	30,084	16.6%	35,000
6	AS Saint-Étienne	28,052	21.6%	38,000
7	FC Nantes	28,051	5.1%	36,000
8	FC Metz	19,868	13.4%	34,000
9	RC Strasbourg	19,852	13.2%	25,648
10	ESTAC	14,139	143.7%	22,072
11	MHSC	13,956	-5.0%	27,960
12	Stade rennais	13,723	-12.1%	17,734
13	CS Sedan	12,953	112.2%	18,000
14	Le Havre AC	12,323	4.4%	17,500
15	AJ auxerroise	11,954	1.3%	20,000
16	AS Nancy	10,373	-6.8%	17,000
17	AS Monaco	10,026	34.9%	18,500
18	SC Bastia	6,926	32.6%	10,800
