= 1998–99 FC Nantes Atlantique season =

Nantes Atlantique
1998–99 season
- Manager: Raynald Denoueix
- Stadium: Stade de la Beaujoire
- Division 1: 7th
- Coupe de France: Winners
- Coupe de la Ligue: Round of 32
- Top goalscorer: League: Olivier Monterrubio (8); All: Olivier Monterrubio (12)
- Average home league attendance: 26,700

The 1998–99 season was the 56th season in the existence of Nantes Atlantique and the club's 37th consecutive season in the top flight of French football.

== Season summary ==
Nantes Atlantique competed in the French Division 1, the Coupe de France, and the Coupe de la Ligue, Trophée des Champions.

The 1998–99 season saw Nantes win their second Coupe de France title, and first in twenty years, qualifying for the following season's Trophée des Champions and UEFA Cup.

== Squad ==
Note: Flags indicate national team as defined under FIFA eligibility rules; some limited exceptions apply. Players may hold more than one non-FIFA nationality.

No.	Pos.	Nation	Player
1	GK	FRA	Mickaël Landreau
2	DF	ARG	Néstor Fabbri
4	DF	FRA	Éric Decroix
5	DF	FRA	Nicolas Gillet
6	MF	CMR	Salomon Olembe
7	MF	FRA	Christophe Le Roux
8	MF	FRA	Nicolas Savinaud
9	FW	SEN	Samba N'Diaye
10	MF	FRA	Antoine Sibierski
11	FW	ARG	Diego Bustos
12	MF	FRA	Sébastien Piocelle
13	MF	FRA	Charles Devineau
14	MF	FRA	Frédéric Da Rocha
15	MF	FRA	Eric Carrière

No.	Pos.	Nation	Player
16	GK	FRA	Willy Grondin
17	FW	FRA	Alioune Touré
18	MF	FRA	Olivier Monterrubio
19	DF	FRA	Jean-Marc Chanelet
20	MF	FRA	Mehdi Leroy
21	DF	FRA	Pascal Delhommeau
22	MF	FRA	Samuel Fenillat
24	DF	FRA	Yves Deroff
25	FW	FRA	Patrick Suffo
27	MF	CMR	Sébastien Macé
28	FW	ARG	Sérgio Comba
33	FW	FRA	Marama Vahirua
—	GK	FRA	Éric Loussouarn

== Overall record ==
Competition	First match	Last match	Starting round	Final position	Record							
Competition	First match	Last match	Starting round	Final position	Pld	W	D	L	GF	GA	GD	Win %
Division 1	8 August 1998	29 May 1999	Matchday 1	7th	34	12	12	10	40	34	+6	35.29
Coupe de France	23 January 1999	15 May 1999	Round of 64	Winners	6	5	1	0	9	2	+7	83.33
Coupe de la Ligue	9 January 1999		Round of 32	Round of 32	1	0	0	1	0	1	−1	0.00
Total					41	17	13	11	49	37	+12	41.46

Source: Competitions

== Competitions ==
=== French Division 1 ===
==== League table ====
Pos	Team	Pld	W	D	L	GF	GA	GD	Pts	Qualification or relegation
5	Rennes	34	17	8	9	45	38	+7	59	Qualification to Intertoto Cup third round
6	Lens	34	14	7	13	46	43	+3	49	Qualification to UEFA Cup first round (Note: Lens was qualified for the 1999–2000 UEFA Cup as winners of the 1998–99 Coupe de la Ligue. Also, Nantes was qualified for the 1999–2000 UEFA Cup as winners of the 1998–99 Coupe de France.)
7	Nantes	34	12	12	10	40	34	+6	48	Qualification to UEFA Cup first round
8	Montpellier	34	11	10	13	53	50	+3	43	Qualification to Intertoto Cup second round
9	Paris Saint-Germain	34	10	9	15	34	35	−1	39	

Source: Ligue 1
Rules for classification: 1) points; 2) goal difference; 3) number of goals scored.

==== Results summary ====
Overall								Home						Away					
Pld	W	D	L	GF	GA	GD	Pts	W	D	L	GF	GA	GD	W	D	L	GF	GA	GD
34	12	12	10	40	34	+6	48	8	7	2	20	8	+12	4	5	8	20	26	−6

Source: Ligue 1

==== Results by round ====
Round	1	2	3	4	5	6	7	8	9	10	11	12	13	14	15	16	17	18	19	20	21	22	23	24	25	26	27	28	29	30	31	32	33	34
Ground	A	H	A	H	A	H	A	H	A	H	A	A	H	A	H	A	H	A	H	A	H	A	H	A	H	A	H	H	A	H	A	H	A	H
Result	L	W	L	W	W	D	W	W	L	D	L	D	D	L	D	W	W	D	W	D	W	D	W	L	D	D	L	D	L	D	W	W	L	L
Position	18	9	13	10	5	7	5	3	6	6	7	6	7	9	11	8	6	6	4	5	4	5	4	5	6	6	7	6	6	7	6	6	6	7

Source: Ligue 1
A = Away; H = Home; W = Win; D = Draw; L = Loss

=== Coupe de France ===
23 January 1999 Round of 64	La Roche VF	0–1	Nantes	La Roche-sur-Yon
			Monterrubio 7'	Attendance: 4,978

20 February 1999 Round of 32	Paris Saint-Germain	1–1 (a.e.t.) (3–5 p)	Nantes	Parc des Princes, Paris
			Decroix 33'	Attendance: 25,000

14 March 1999 Round of 16	Metz	1–3	Nantes	Stade Saint-Symphorien, Metz
			Monterrubio 33'; Savinaud 48'; Touré 90'	Attendance: 9,214

10 April 1999 Quarter-final	Nantes	2–0	Guingamp	Stade de la Beaujoire, Nantes
	Monterrubio 30'; Deroff 90'			Attendance: 29,321

28 April 1999 Semi-final	Nantes	1–0	Nîmes	Stade de la Beaujoire, Nantes
	Savinaud 77'	Report		Attendance: 24,688

15 May 1999 Final	Nantes Atlantique	1–0	Sedan	Stade de France, Saint-Denis
	Monterrubio 58' (pen.)	Report		Attendance: 78,586; Referee: Pascal Garibian

=== Coupe de la Ligue ===
9 January 1999 Round of 32	Metz	1–0	Nantes	Stade Saint-Symphorien, Metz
		Report	Potillon 11' (o.g.)	Attendance: 10,801
