= 1999–2000 FC Nantes Atlantique season =

Nantes Atlantique
1999–2000 season
- Manager: Raynald Denoueix
- Stadium: Stade de la Beaujoire
- Division 1: 12th
- Coupe de France: Winners
- Coupe de la Ligue: Round of 32
- Trophée des Champions: Winners
- UEFA Cup: Third round
- Top goalscorer: League: Antoine Sibierski (13); All: Antoine Sibierski (23)
- Average home league attendance: 28,335

The 1999–2000 season was the 57th season in the existence of Nantes Atlantique and the club's 38th consecutive season in the top flight of French football.

== Season summary ==
Nantes Atlantique competed in the French Division 1, the Coupe de France, Coupe de la Ligue, Trophée des Champions, and the UEFA Cup. Nantes Atlantique entered the season as reigning Coupe de France winners, having defeated Sedan in the final in May 1999. Despite struggling in the league and only finishing one point above the relegation zone, the 1999–2000 season would prove to be one of the most successful campaigns in club history, winning both the Coupe de France and Trophée des Champions.

The Coupe de France final is noteworthy as Nantes Atlantique's opponents, Calais, became the first amateur club to reach the final. Nantes would prevail with a 90th-minute penalty converted by top scorer Antoine Sibierski after a back and forth match. Calais' cup run was voted as the best of all time by France Football magazine readers in 2017 and the club went through bankruptcy and liquidation later that same year.

== Competitions ==
=== French Division 1 ===
==== League table ====
Pos	Team	Pld	W	D	L	GF	GA	GD	Pts	Qualification or relegation
10	Bastia	34	11	12	11	43	39	+4	45	
11	Metz	34	9	17	8	38	33	+5	44	
12	Nantes	34	12	7	15	39	40	−1	43	Qualification to UEFA Cup first round (Note: Nantes was qualified for the 2000–01 UEFA Cup as winners of the 1999–2000 Coupe de France.)
13	Rennes	34	12	7	15	44	48	−4	43	
14	Troyes	34	13	4	17	36	52	−16	43	

Source: Ligue 1
Rules for classification: 1) points; 2) goal difference; 3) number of goals scored.

==== Results summary ====
Overall								Home						Away					
Pld	W	D	L	GF	GA	GD	Pts	W	D	L	GF	GA	GD	W	D	L	GF	GA	GD
34	12	7	15	39	40	−1	43	9	2	6	27	17	+10	3	5	9	12	23	−11

Source: Ligue 1

==== Results by round ====
Round	1	2	3	4	5	6	7	8	9	10	11	12	13	14	15	16	17	18	19	20	21	22	23	24	25	26	27	28	29	30	31	32	33	34
Ground	H	A	H	A	H	A	H	A	H	A	H	A	H	H	A	H	A	H	A	H	A	H	A	H	A	H	A	H	A	A	H	A	H	A
Result	W	W	L	L	W	L	W	L	L	L	L	L	L	W	D	W	D	L	W	D	L	W	D	L	D	W	L	W	L	D	D	L	W	W
Position	6	2	3	8	5	6	4	7	9	12	14	15	17	15	15	12	12	14	13	13	15	13	13	16	15	14	14	13	13	14	15	16	14	12

Source: Ligue 1
A = Away; H = Home; W = Win; D = Draw; L = Loss

=== Coupe de France ===
22 January 2000 Round of 64	FA Carcassonne-Villalbe	0–4	Nantes	Stade Jean-Claude-Mazet, Carcassonne
			Sibierski 15', 66'; Caveglia 24'; Carrière 42'	Attendance: 10,000

12 February 2000 Round of 32	FC Montceau Bourgogne	0–6	Nantes	Stade des Alouettes, Montceau-les-Mines
			Carrière 13'; Da Rocha 26'; Devineau 47'; Sibierski 61'; Caveglia 68' (pen.); Suffo 85'	Attendance: 5,781

19 March 2000 Round of 16	Nantes	0–0 (a.e.t.) (5–3 p)	Gueugnon	Stade de la Beaujoire, Nantes
				Attendance: 17,000

19 March 2000 Quarter-final	Nantes	2–1 (a.e.t.)	Rennes	Stade de la Beaujoire, Nantes
	Fabbri 37'; Sibierski 118'			Attendance: 25,000

12 April 2000 Semi-final	AS Monaco	0–1	Nantes	Stade Louis II, Monaco
		(Report)	Da Rocha 82'	Attendance: 14,000

7 May 2000 Final	Nantes	2–1	Calais RUFC	Stade de France, Saint-Denis
	Sibierski 50', 90' (pen.)	Report	Dutitre 34'	Attendance: 78,586; Referee: Claude Colombo

=== Coupe de la Ligue ===
9 January 2000 Round of 32	Saint-Étienne	3–1	Nantes	Stade Geoffroy-Guichard, Saint-Étienne
			Potillon 11' (o.g.)	Attendance: 16,953

=== Trophée des Champions ===
19 July 1999 Final	Bordeaux	0–1	Nantes	Stade de la Licorne, Amiens
		Report	Monterrubio 57'	Attendance: 11,858; Referee: Stéphane Bré

=== UEFA Cup ===
==== First round ====
16 September 1999 First leg	Ionikos (Greece)	1–3	(France) Nantes	Neapoli Stadium, Nikaia
	Dimitriadis 90'		Lièvre 56'; Monterrubio 67', 83'	Attendance: 3,500; Referee: Stéphane Bré

30 September 1999 Second leg	Nantes (France)	1–0 (4–1 agg.)	(Greece) Ionikos	Stade de la Beaujoire, Nantes
	Da Rocha 48'			Attendance: 18,522

==== Second round ====
21 October 1999 First leg	Inter Bratislava (Slovakia)	0–3	(France) Nantes	Štadión Pasienky, Bratislava
		Report	Sibierski 26' (pen.); Da Rocha 35'; Carrière 86'	Attendance: 4,486; Referee: Roy Helge Olsen (Norway)

4 November 1999 Second leg	Nantes (France)	4–0 (7–0 agg.)	(Slovakia) Inter Bratislava	Stade de la Beaujoire, Nantes
	Sibierski 49'; Monterrubio 61'; Devineau 74'; Da Rocha 82'	Report		Attendance: 15,000; Referee: Marcel Lica (Romania)

==== Third round ====
25 November 1999 First leg	Arsenal (England)	3–0	(France) Nantes	Arsenal Stadium, London
	Overmars 13' (pen.); Winterburn 81'; Bergkamp 90'	Report		Attendance: 36,618; Referee: Dani Koren (Israel)

9 December 1999 Second leg	Nantes (France)	3–3 (3–6 agg.)	(England) Arsenal	Stade de la Beaujoire, Nantes
	Sibierski 12', 57'; Vahirua 77'	Report	Grimandi 25'; Henry 31'; Overmars 42'	Attendance: 17,000; Referee: Jan Wegereef (Netherlands)
