= 1999 Coupe de France final =

Final of the 1998–99 edition of the Coupe de France

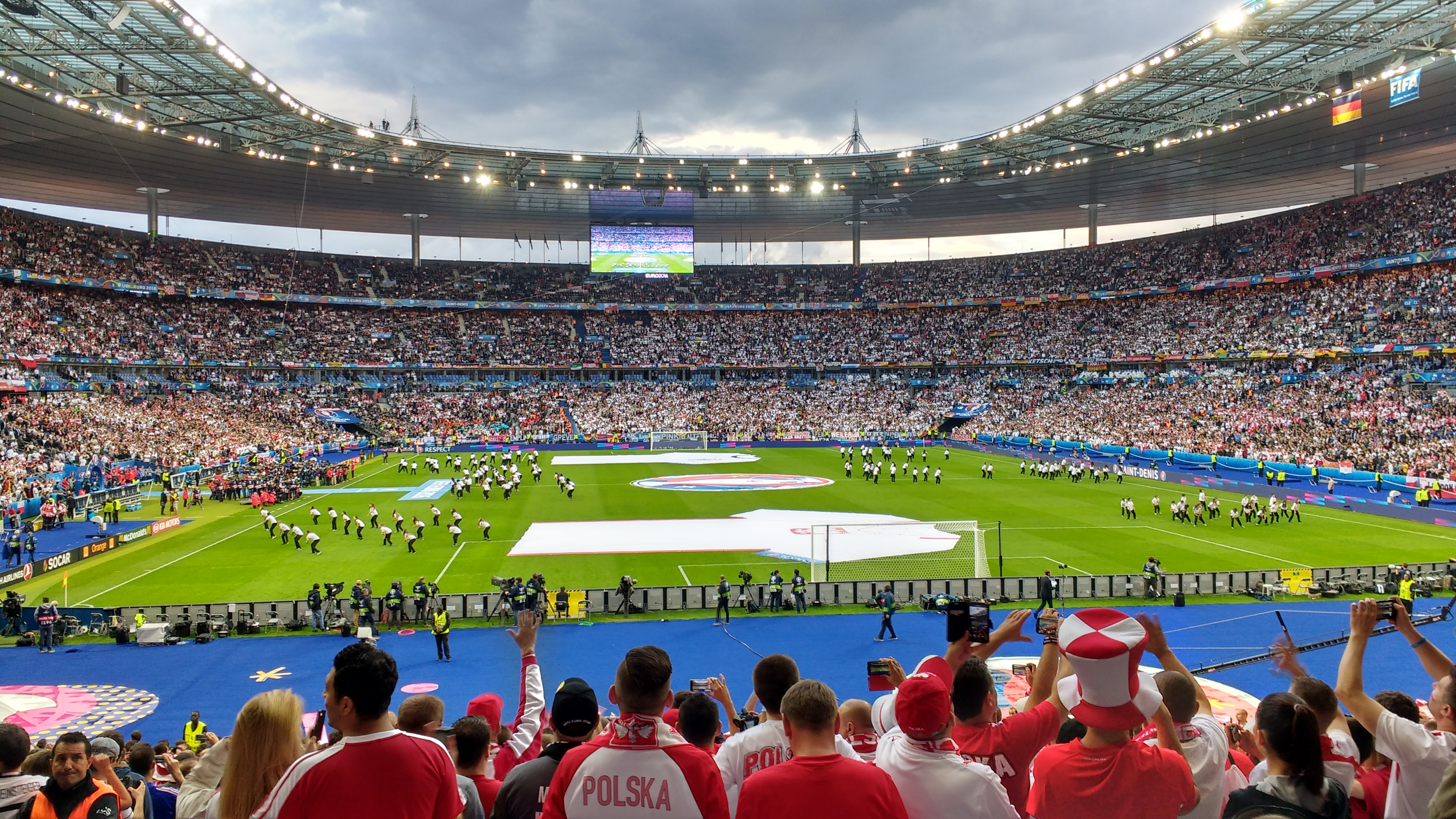
- Event: 1998–99 Coupe de France
Nantes	Sedan
1	0
- Date: 15 May 1999
- Venue: Stade de France, Saint-Denis
- Referee: Pascal Garibian
- Attendance: 78,586

The 1999 Coupe de France final was a football match held at Stade de France, Saint-Denis on 15 May 1999 that saw FC Nantes Atlantique defeat CS Sedan Ardennes from Division 2 1–0 thanks to a goal by Olivier Monterrubio.

== Road to the final ==
Nantes			Round	Sedan
Opponent	H/A	Result	1998–99 Coupe de France	Opponent	H/A	Result
La Roche	A	1–0	Round of 64	Chaumont	A	3–0
Paris SG	A	1–1 (a.e.t.); 5−4 pen.	Round of 32	Dijon	A	4–0
Metz	A	3–1	Round of 16	Amiens	A	2–1
Guingamp	H	2–0	Quarter-finals	Rouen	A	2–0
Nîmes	H	1–0	Semi-finals	Le Mans	H	4–3 (a.e.t.)

== Match details ==
15 May 1999
20:45

Nantes	1–0	Sedan
Monterrubio 58' (pen.)

Stade de France, Saint-Denis
Attendance: 78,586
Referee: Pascal Garibian

GK	1	(France) Mickaël Landreau (c)
DF	2	(France) Jean-Marc Chanelet
DF	4	(France) Éric Decroix
DF	5	(Argentina) Néstor Fabbri	(substituted off) 67'
DF	3	(Cameroon) Salomon Olembé
MF	10	(France) Yves Deroff
MF	9	(France) Eric Carrière
MF	6	(France) Sébastien Piocelle
MF	7	(France) Charles Devineau	(substituted off) 87'
FW	8	(France) Frédéric Da Rocha	(substituted off) 93'
FW	11	(France) Olivier Monterrubio
Substitutes:
DF	15	(France) Nicolas Gillet	(substituted on) 67'
MF	16	(France) Nicolas Savinaud	(substituted on) 87'
FW	14	(Cameroon) Patrick Suffo	(substituted on) 93'
Manager:
(France) Raynald Denoueix

GK	1	(France) Nicolas Sachy
DF	4	(France) Christophe Borbiconi	(substituted off) 77'
DF	5	(Brazil) Eduardo Oliveira	(substituted off) 70'
DF	3	(France) Luis Satorra (c)
DF	11	(France) Cédric Elzéard
MF	7	(France) Pierre Deblock
MF	6	(France) Bruno Pabois	(substituted off) 61'
MF	2	(France) Jean-Philippe Faure
MF	8	(France) Olivier Quint
FW	9	(France) Cédric Mionnet
FW	10	(France) Alex Di Rocco
Substitutes:
FW	12	(Cameroon) Pius N'Diefi	(substituted on) 61'
DF	14	(France) Hippolyte Dangbeto	(substituted on) 70'
MF	15	(France) Éric Crosnier	(substituted on) 77'
Manager:
(France) Patrick Rémy

== See also ==
- 1998–99 Coupe de France
