= 2000 Coupe de France final =

Final of the 1999–2000 edition of the Coupe de France

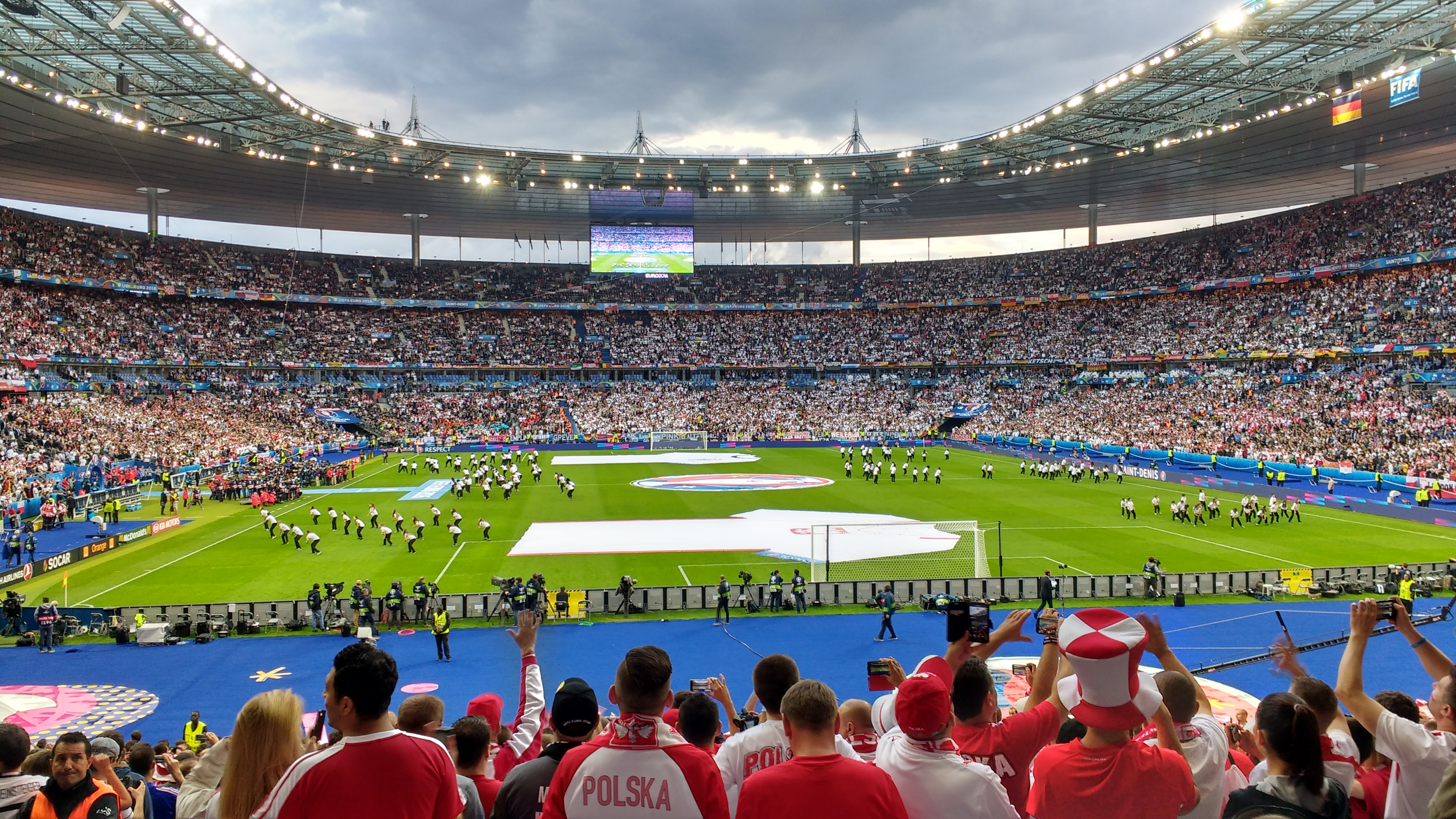
- Event: 1999–2000 Coupe de France
Nantes	Calais
2	1
- Date: 7 May 2000
- Venue: Stade de France, Saint-Denis
- Referee: Claude Colombo
- Attendance: 78,717

The 2000 Coupe de France final was a football match held at Stade de France, Saint-Denis on 7 May 2000 that saw FC Nantes Atlantique defeat the surprising amateur team of Calais RUFC from CFA 2–1 thanks to two goals by Antoine Sibierski.

== Road to the final ==
Nantes			Round	Calais
Opponent	H/A	Result	1999–2000 Coupe de France	Opponent	H/A	Result
Bye	—	—	Fourth Round	Campagne-lès-Hesdin	A	10–0
Bye	—	—	Fifth Round	Saint-Nicolas-les-Arras	A	3–1
Bye	—	—	Sixth Round	Marly	A	2–1
Bye	—	—	Seventh Round	Béthune	H	1–0
Bye	—	—	Eighth Round	Dunkerque	H	4–0
Carcassonne	A	4–1	Round of 64	Lille	A	1–1 (a.e.t.); 7−6 pen.
Montceau	H	6–1	Round of 32	Langon-Castet	H	3–0
Gueugnon	H	0–0 (a.e.t.); 5−3 pen.	Round of 16	Cannes	H	1–1 (a.e.t.); 4−1 pen.
Rennes	H	2–1 (a.e.t.)	Quarter-finals	Strasbourg	H	2–1
Monaco	A	1–0	Semi-finals	Bordeaux	H	3–1 (a.e.t.)

== Match details ==
7 May 2000
20:45

Nantes	2–1	Calais
Sibierski 50', 90' (pen.)		Dutitre 34'

Stade de France, Saint-Denis
Attendance: 78,717
Referee: Claude Colombo

GK	1	(France) Mickaël Landreau (c)
DF	2	(France) Jean-Marc Chanelet
DF	4	(France) Nicolas Gillet
DF	5	(Argentina) Nestor Fabbri
DF	6	(Cameroon) Salomon Olembé
MF	9	(France) Eric Carrière
MF	3	(France) Mathieu Berson
MF	10	(France) Antoine Sibierski
MF	11	(France) Charles Devineau	(substituted off) 69'
FW	7	(France) Alioune Touré	(substituted off) 73'
FW	8	(France) Frédéric da Rocha
Substitutes:
MF	15	(France) Olivier Monterrubio	(substituted on) 69'
FW	14	(France) Alain Caveglia	(substituted on) 73'
Manager:
(France) Reynald Denoueix

GK	1	(France) Cédric Schille
DF	2	(France) Jocelyn Merlen
DF	4	(France) Fabrice Baron
DF	5	(France) Grégory Deswarte
DF	3	(France) Réginald Becque (c)
MF	7	(France) Cédric Jandau
MF	6	(France) Grégory Lefebvre	(substituted off) 54'
MF	10	(France) Emmanuel Vasseur
MF	8	(France) Christophe Hogard
FW	9	(France) Mickaël Gérard
FW	11	(France) Jérôme Dutitre	(substituted off) 54'
Substitutes:
MF	12	(France) Stéphane Canu	(substituted on) 54'
MF	13	(France) Mathieu Millien	(substituted on) 54' (substituted off) 90'
MF	14	(France) Benoît Lestavel	(substituted on) 90'
Manager:
(Spain) Ladislas Lozano

== See also ==
- 1999–2000 Coupe de France
