= Réginald Becque =

French football player and manager (born 1972)

Personal information
- Date of birth: 13 September 1972 (age 54)
- Place of birth: Denain, France
- Height: 1.72 m (5 ft 8 in)
- Position: Defender

Youth career
- 1989–1990: Valenciennes

Senior career*
Years	Team	Apps	(Gls)
1990–1991	Le Havre B		
1991–1993	Niort B		
1993–1996	Fontainebleau		
1996–1998	Valenciennes		
1998–2005	Calais		

Managerial career
- 2005–2009: Calais B
- 2009–2012: AS Audruicq
- Marck
- * Club domestic league appearances and goals

Réginald Becque (born 13 September 1972) is a French former professional football player and manager. (Note: Réginald Becque at WorldFootball.net) As of April 2020, he works for the French Football Federation.

== Playing career ==
In 2000, Becque captained fourth-division side Calais RUFC to the Coupe de France Final, which they eventually lost by a score of 2–1 against Nantes. At the end of the match, Mickaël Landreau, who was the captain of Nantes, let Becque lift the Coupe de France trophy with him.

== After football ==
Becque retired from football in 2005, at the age of 32. He went on to be a coach for Calais B, AS Audruicq, and AS Marck.

As of April 2020, Becque works in the FFF amateur departments.

== Honours ==
Valenciennes

- Championnat de France Amateur: 1997–98

Calais

- Coupe de France runner-up: 1999–2000
