= Mickaël Landreau =

French footballer and manager (born 1979)

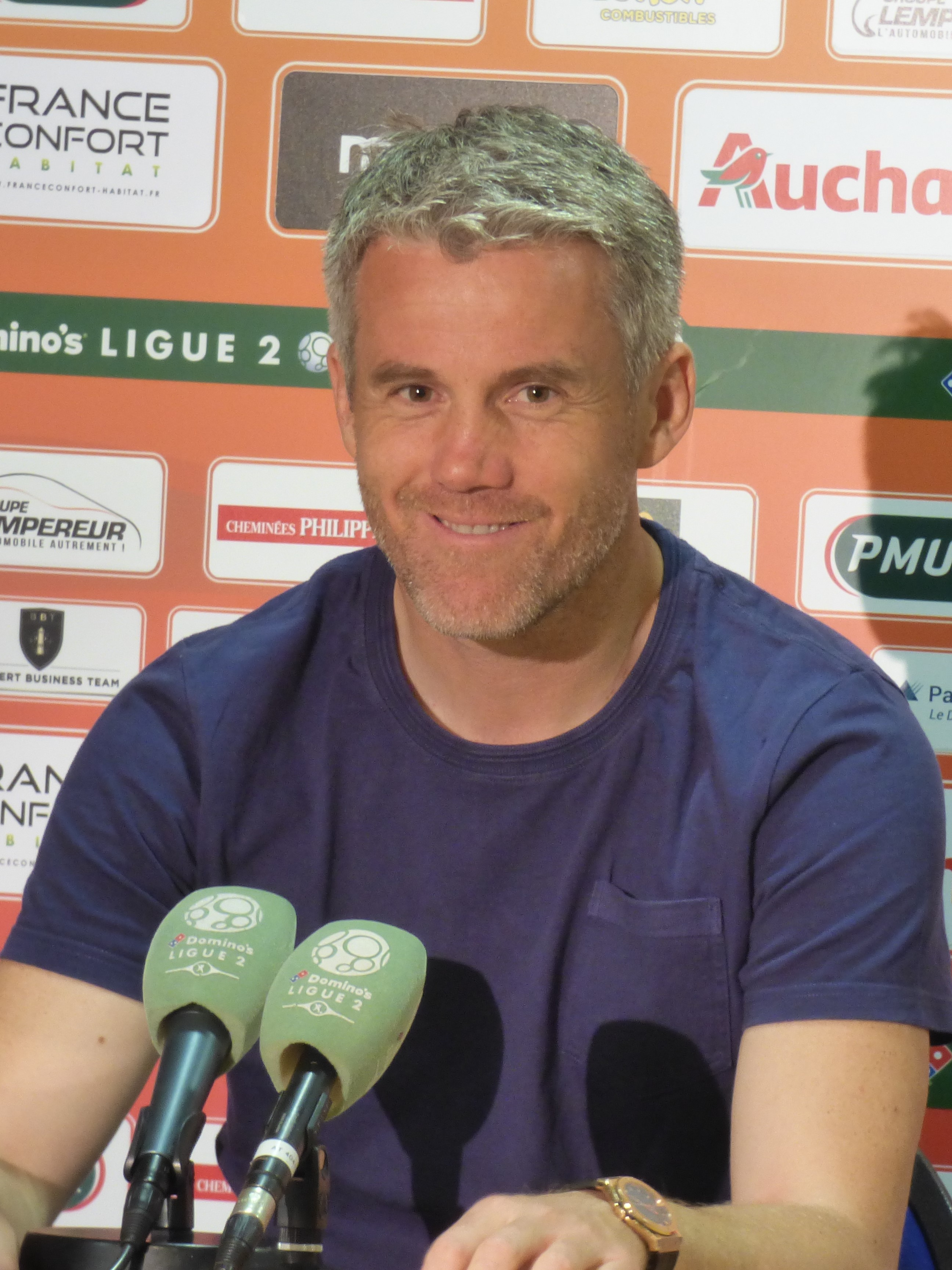
- Landreau as Lorient manager in 2019

Personal information
- Full name: Mickaël Vincent André-Marie Landreau
- Date of birth: 14 May 1979 (age 47)
- Place of birth: Machecoul, France
- Height: 1.84 m (6 ft 0 in)
- Position: Goalkeeper

Youth career
- 1985–1992: Étoile Arthonnaise
- 1992–1993: GS Saint-Sébastien-sur-Loire
- 1993–1996: Nantes

Senior career*
Years	Team	Apps	(Gls)
1996–2006	Nantes	335	(0)
2006–2009	Paris Saint-Germain	114	(0)
2009–2012	Lille	119	(0)
2012–2014	Bastia	50	(0)
Total		618	(0)

International career
1997–2002	France U21	46	(0)
2001–2014	France	11	(0)

Managerial career
- 2016–2017: Paris FC (assistant)
- 2017–2019: Lorient
Medal record
Men's football
Representing France
FIFA Confederations Cup
Winner	2001
Winner	2003
FIFA World Cup
Runner-up	2006
UEFA European Under-21 Championship
Runner-up	2002
- * Club domestic league appearances and goals

Mickaël Vincent André-Marie Landreau (French pronunciation: [mikaɛl lɑ̃dʁo]; born 14 May 1979) is a French professional football manager and former player who played as a goalkeeper.

Landreau holds the record for Ligue 1 appearances, with 618 for Nantes, Paris Saint-Germain, Lille and Bastia between 1996 and 2014. He won a league title with Nantes in 2001 and Lille in 2011.

Landreau was a long-term France international but always as back-up. He was part of their squads that won the Confederations Cup in 2001 and 2003, and finished runners-up at the 2006 World Cup, along with other tournament call-ups.

== Club career ==
=== Nantes ===
Born in Machecoul, Landreau graduated from the Nantes Atlantique "Centre of Excellence" in La Jonelière. His first professional match for Nantes was a 0–0 draw against Bastia on 2 October 1996 and saved the penalty from Ľubomír Moravčík. Since 1996, he remained a mainstay in the Nantes starting line-up, and consistently produced excellent performances. At age 19, Landreau became captain. He was selected to represent the France youth national team at the 1997 FIFA World Youth Championship.

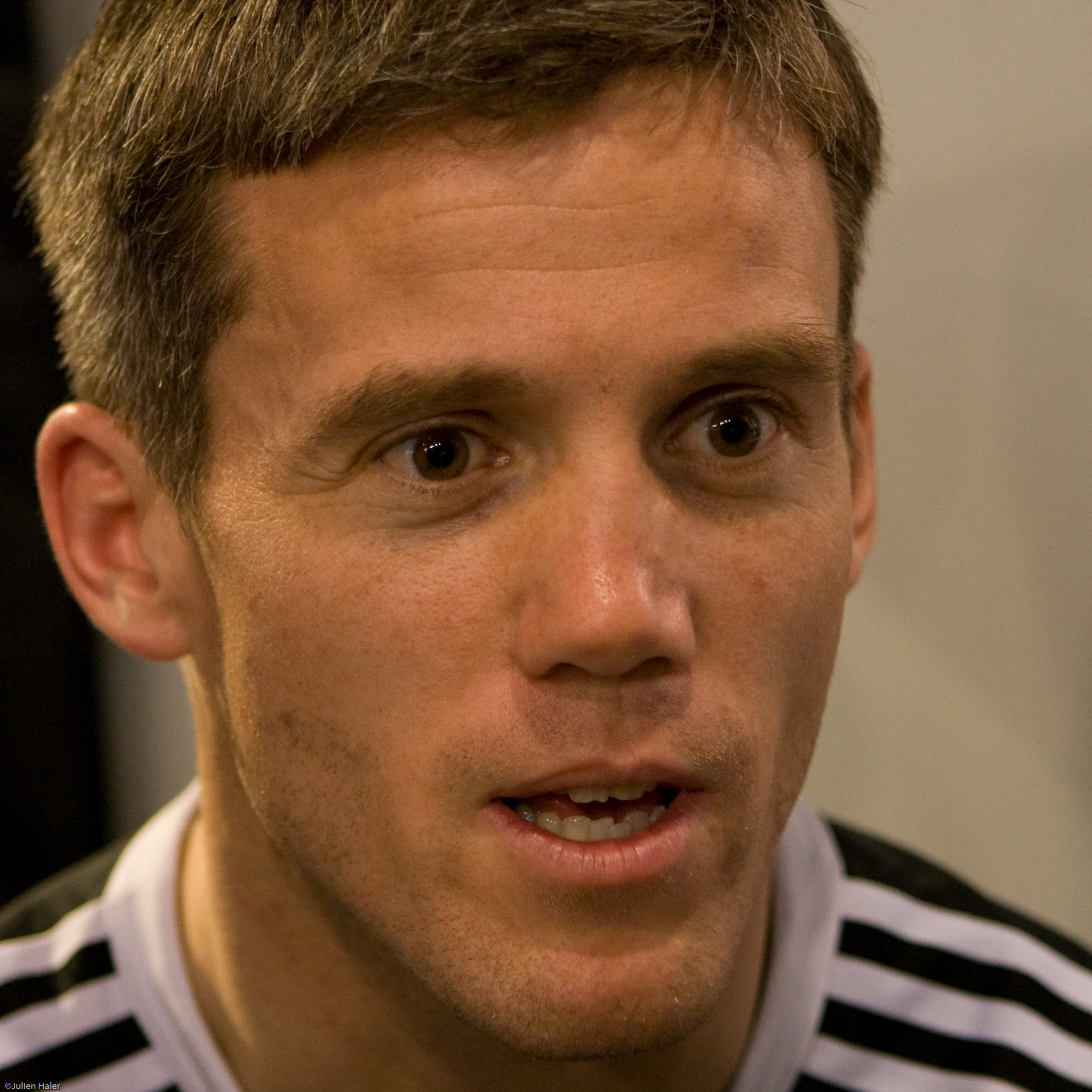
Landreau during a casting organized by Adidas.

In the next ten years, he hardly missed a game, completing in July 2005 300 matches for Nantes and was an important support for his team during their successes around the turn of the millennium. Having won two consecutive Coupe de France trophies in 1999 and 2000 (captained in the 2000 final), Nantes were crowned 2001 Ligue 1 champions for the first time since 1995. In the same when Nantes won the Ligue 1, Landreau signed a new contract, keeping him until 2006. His good performance at Nantes led Landreau drew strong interest from clubs like Barcelona, Monaco, Roma, Juventus, Marseille, Manchester United and Celtic.

On 11 October 2003, Landreau had an operation on his articular disk which was a serious injury in his football career. On 22 November 2003, Landreau made his return in a 3–1 win over his (first match in his career) against Bastia. In the semi-final of the 2004 French Cup, Landreau produced several saves, but to no avail as the team could not score and were eliminated from the competition. In the final of Coupe de la Ligue against Sochaux-Montbéliard, the match was 1–1 and played until the penalty shootout. Landreau shot the seventh penalty in a panenka style, only to be saved by Teddy Richert. Nantes were about to lose the game when Pascal Delhommeau missed, allowing Benoît Pedretti to score the winning penalty. After the match, Landreau said he had "no regrets" on missing the penalty in that manner.

At the end of the 2005–06 Ligue 1 season, Landreau's contract with Nantes was set to expire but Nantes was set to offer Landreau a new contract along with Mauro Cetto and Jérémy Toulalan. He gave a press conference and announced that after thirteen years, he would leave FC Nantes to meet new challenges in a more important team. He announced his intention to leave his first club just before the end of the 2005–2006 season. As his contract expired, Arsenal and A.C. Milan were among interested signing him. During his last match at Stade de la Beaujoire on 6 May 2006, he received a tribute from the fans who saluted his dedication and loyalty to the club for thirteen years. The season following his departure, Nantes was relegated to Ligue 2 for the first time since 1963.

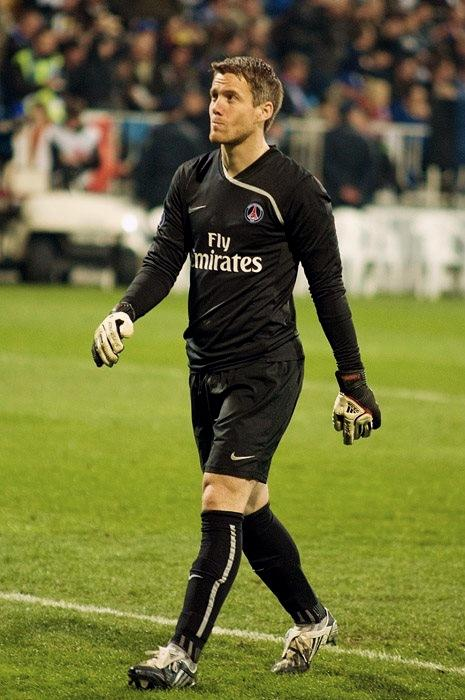
Landreau during a match between Dynamo Kyiv and PSG.

=== Paris Saint-Germain ===
Landreau then joined Paris Saint-Germain on a free transfer, signing a four-years contract on 15 May 2006. After his move to Paris, Landreau says moving to Paris could earn him a call up from France.

At Paris Saint-Germain, Landreau established himself as a first choice goalkeeper beating Jérôme Alonzo and youngster Nicolas Cousin He also became a fan favorite. On 5 August 2006, Landreau made his debut for PSG in a 3–2 loss against Lorient. In the 2006–07, the 2007–08 and the 2008–09 season, Landreau played all 38 appearance in his PSG Career. At his last appearance at PSG in a match against AS Monaco which resulted in a 0–0 draw and his last clean sheet, he thanked the fans for his time at the club and they passed him with a rare standing ovation. After the 2007–08 season ended, Landreau had been linked with a move away from the club after Grégory Coupet remained keen to play abroad at PSG, who could replaced him as a first choice goalkeeper. However, Charles Villeneuve said he had not confirmed Landreau's place in the squad for next season and had hinted at an interest in Coupet but Sebastien Bazin (the chairman of PSG's majority shareholders Colony Capital) insisted Landreau will not be leaving the club. Reports claims Landreau could be set to move to Real Madrid in order to become Iker Casillas’ understudy. Coupet eventually move to Paris Saint-Germain putting Landreau’s future in doubt.

=== Lille ===
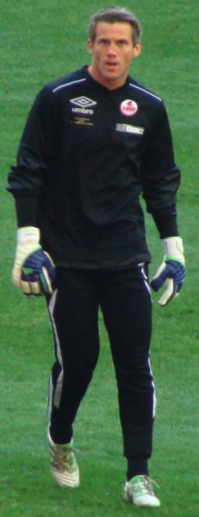
Landreau in training just before the final of the Coupe de France match with Lille.

After the 2009–10 season, Lille OSC made a €2 million (£1.7 million) offer for Landreau who wanted him to replace the veteran goalkeeper Grégory Malicki who left Lille to join Dijon on a free transfer and was the first choice goalkeeper for Lille in the 2008–09 season. The move was agreed and was completed. Five days after signing for Lille, he suffered a massive blow by damaging cruciate ligaments during a training session which kept him out of action for around six months. During his absence due to injury, Ludovic Butelle got more playing time and played about 10 matches until Landreau returned and he later became the first choice-goalkeeper ever since. On 22 October 2009, Landreau was back on the bench in Europa League during the match against Genoa (3–0) and made his league debut for Lille in a 2–0 win over Grenoble on 30 October 2009.

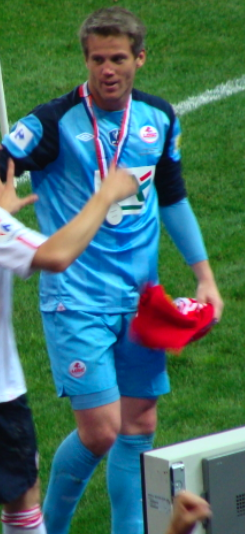
Landreau wearing the medal of the winner of the Coupe de France 2011.

In the 2010–11 season, Landreau was involved in the Lille squad that won the Ligue 1 for the third time in club history and the first time since 1954. He made history by becoming the first player ever to compete in the Trophée des Champions with three clubs.

On 7 November 2012, he allowed six goals from Bayern Munich during a Champions League match. In December 2012 as a remaining first choice goalkeeper, Landreau left Lille by mutual consent after a strained relationship with general manager Frederic Paquet. In the press conference, Landreau said "The most important thing is to blossom on the pitch. I could not anymore. And a year and a half is a long way to go when you have hard days." and left the club both sportingly and psychologically.

=== Bastia ===
On 23 December 2012, Landreau signed a six-month contract with the Corsican club SC Bastia. Upon moving to Bastia, he revealed that he had turned down a move to Italian side Inter Milan. On 4 December 2013, Landreau broke the record for the most appearances by any player in Ligue 1 or Division 1 - the top flight in French football - when he started in the match against AC Ajaccio. It was Landreau's 603rd Ligue 1 match. Three days earlier, he had equalled the previous record of 602 Ligue 1 or Division 1 matches held by former AS Monaco goalkeeper Jean-Luc Ettori when he appeared in the SC Bastia-Evian TG match.

=== Management ===
In August 2016, Landreau was appointed assistant manager to Réginald Ray at Championnat National club Paris FC. In May 2017, he was given a four-year contract at Lorient, newly relegated to Ligue 2. He quit that job halfway through the deal in May 2019, having finished sixth and therefore missed out on the objective of promotion.

== International career ==
Landreau was part of the France squad that won the 2001 FIFA Confederations Cup in South Korea and Japan. He made his debut in his only appearance of the tournament, a 4–0 win over Mexico in the final group game on 3 June. He did not play again until the 2003 edition that the team won again on home soil, taking part in a 5–0 win over New Zealand at the exact same stage at the Stade de France.

At UEFA Euro 2004 and the 2006 FIFA World Cup, Landreau wore France's number one jersey despite being the third-choice goalkeeper behind Fabien Barthez and Grégory Coupet and unused in both tournaments as a result. He played half of the 12 matches in UEFA Euro 2008 qualifying, but was overlooked for the final tournament in Austria and Switzerland, where Sébastien Frey and Steve Mandanda backed up Coupet.

Landreau was recalled to the France national team in September 2012 by newly appointed manager Didier Deschamps for upcoming 2014 FIFA World Cup qualification matches against Finland on 7 September and Belarus on 11 September. It was his first national call-up since November 2007. He went to the finals in Brazil, as third choice behind Hugo Lloris and Stéphane Ruffier. After the tournament, he retired from club and international football at the age of 35, to spend more time with his family.

== Career statistics ==
=== Club ===
Appearances and goals by club, season and competition
Club	Season	League			National cup (Note: Includes Coupe de France)		League cup (Note: Includes Coupe de la Ligue)		Europe		Other (Note: Includes Trophée des champions, UEFA Supercup, and FIFA Club World Cup)		Total	
Club	Season	Division	Apps	Goals	Apps	Goals	Apps	Goals	Apps	Goals	Apps	Goals	Apps	Goals
Nantes	1996–97	Division 1	29	0	0	0	1	0	2	0	—		32	0
Nantes	1997–98	Division 1	33	0	2	0	1	0	2	0	—		38	0
Nantes	1998–99	Division 1	31	0	6	0	0	0	—		—		37	0
Nantes	1999–2000	Division 1	33	0	6	0	1	0	6	0	1	0	47	0
Nantes	2000–01	Division 1	33	0	5	0	3	0	8	0	1	0	50	0
Nantes	2001–02	Division 1	33	0	0	0	1	0	11	0	1	0	46	0
Nantes	2002–03	Ligue 1	36	0	1	0	3	0	—		—		40	0
Nantes	2003–04	Ligue 1	34	0	5	0	4	0	2	0	—		45	0
Nantes	2004–05	Ligue 1	37	0	3	0	2	0	1	0	—		43	0
Nantes	2005–06	Ligue 1	36	0	5	0	2	0	—		—		43	0
Nantes	Total		335	0	33	0	18	0	32	0	3	0	421	0
Paris Saint-Germain	2006–07	Ligue 1	38	0	4	0	0	0	10	0	1	0	53	0
Paris Saint-Germain	2007–08	Ligue 1	38	0	2	0	5	0	—		—		45	0
Paris Saint-Germain	2008–09	Ligue 1	38	0	2	0	3	0	10	0	—		53	0
Paris Saint-Germain	Total		114	0	8	0	8	0	20	0	1	0	151	0
Lille	2009–10	Ligue 1	28	0	0	0	2	0	7	0	—		37	0
Lille	2010–11	Ligue 1	38	0	6	0	2	0	9	0	—		55	0
Lille	2011–12	Ligue 1	38	0	3	0	0	0	5	0	1	0	47	0
Lille	2012–13	Ligue 1	15	0	0	0	0	0	6	0	—		21	0
Lille	Total		119	0	9	0	4	0	27	0	1	0	160	0
Bastia	2012–13	Ligue 1	19	0	—		—		—		—		19	0
Bastia	2013–14	Ligue 1	31	0	1	0	1	0	—		—		33	0
Bastia	Total		50	0	1	0	1	0	—		—		52	0
Career total			618	0	51	0	31	0	79	0	5	0	784	0

=== International ===
Appearances and goals by national team and year
National team	Year	Apps	Goals
France	2001	1	0
France	2003	1	0
France	2004	1	0
France	2006	1	0
France	2007	7	0
Total		11	0

== Managerial statistics ==
As of 17 May 2019

Team	From	To	Record							
Team	From	To	G	W	D	L	GF	GA	GD	Win %
Lorient	30 May 2017	28 May 2019	88	42	21	25	134	98	+36	47.73
Career totals			88	42	21	25	134	98	+36	47.73

== Honours ==
Nantes

- Division 1: 2000–01
- Coupe de France: 1998–99, 1999–2000
- Trophée des Champions: 1999, 2001

Paris Saint-Germain

- Coupe de la Ligue: 2007–08

Lille

- Ligue 1: 2010–11
- Coupe de France: 2010–11

France

- FIFA Confederations Cup: 2001, 2003
- FIFA World Cup runner-up: 2006
