= Alioune Touré =

French footballer (born 1978)

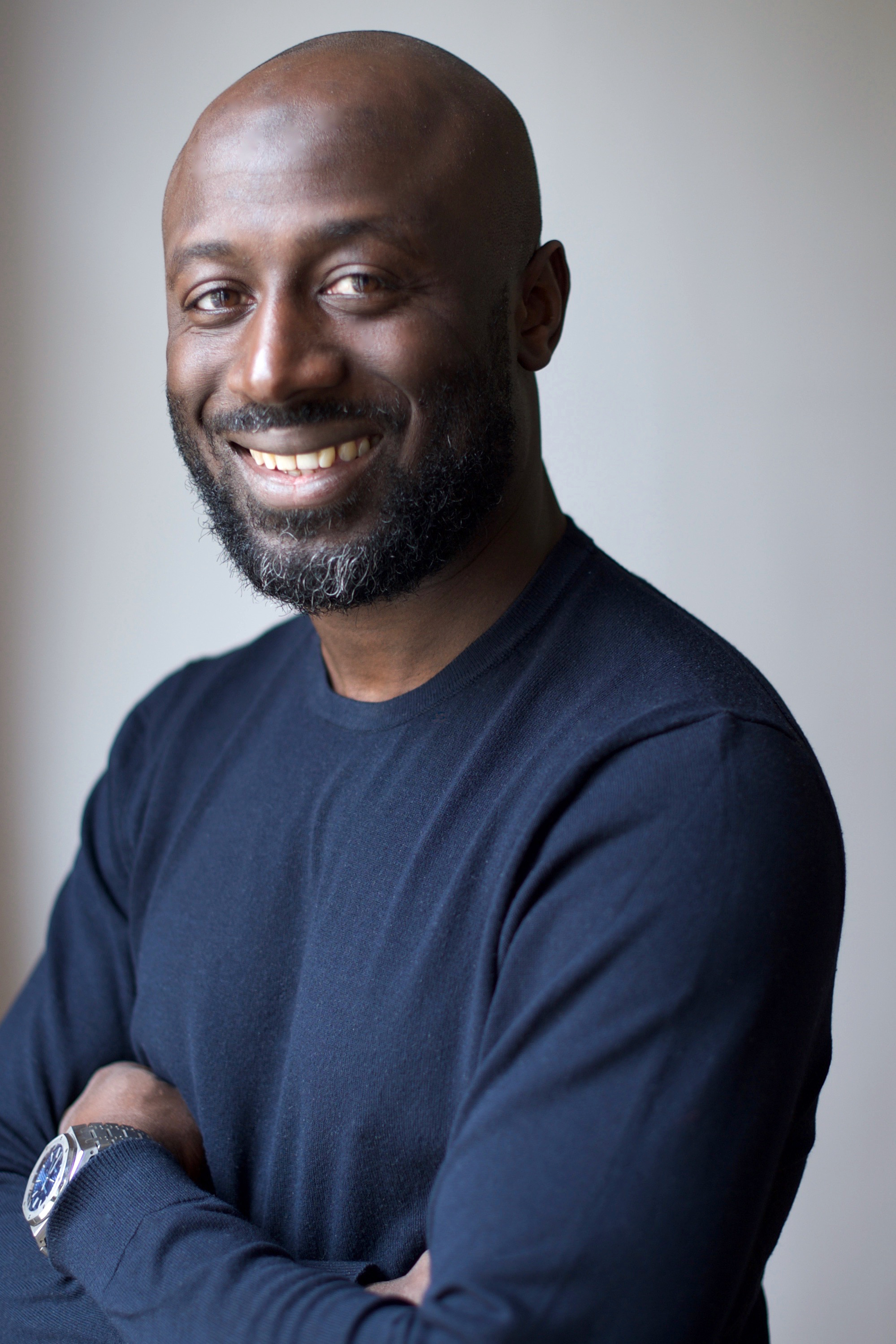

Personal information
- Full name: Alioune Kissima Touré
- Date of birth: 9 September 1978 (age 48)
- Place of birth: Saint-Denis, France
- Height: 1.72 m (5 ft 8 in)
- Position: Attacking midfielder

Youth career
- INF Clairefontaine
- Nantes

Senior career*
Years	Team	Apps	(Gls)
1996–2001	Nantes	49	(3)
2001–2002	Manchester City	1	(0)
2002–2004	Paris Saint-Germain	25	(1)
2004–2005	→ Guingamp (loan)	11	(0)
2005–2007	União de Leiria	40	(2)
2007–2008	Dubai CSC		
2008–2009	Olympiakos Nicosia	0	(0)
2009–2010	Paris FC	2	(1)

International career
1997	France U18		
1998	France U21		

Managerial career
- 2012–: Shanghai Shenhua (Coach)
- * Club domestic league appearances and goals

Alioune Kissima Touré (born 9 September 1978) is a French former professional footballer. He is an attacking midfielder but can play both as a forward or as a winger.

== Playing career ==
Born in Saint-Denis, Alioune started his career in 1996 with FC Nantes and signed his first professional contract in 1997. During his 7 seasons with the club, he became Ligue 1 winner in 2001 (to which he contributed 15 appearances) and twice a winner of the Coupe de France in 1999 and 2000.

Alioune Toure was then transferred to Manchester City with whom he won the Championship gaining promotion to the Premier League.

In 2002, he signed with Paris Saint-Germain on a five-year contract where he was finalist of the Coupe de France in 2003 before winning it in 2004.

He then played for the Portuguese club União de Leiria between 2005 and 2007 and in Qatar for Dubai CSC in 2008. Back in Europe in 2009, he pursued his career at the Olympiakos Nicosia in Cyprus. After a brief time playing for Paris FC in 2010, he ended his professional footballer's career in 2011.

== Managerial career ==
Then, in 2012 Alioune joined the first league Chinese club Shanghai Shenhua as a coach assistant. In 2013, he pursued his coach training while supervising and detecting young talents in Africa. Finally, he obtained his UEFA A Coaching Licence from the French Football Federation in 2015.

== Honours ==
=== Club ===
Nantes

- Ligue 1: 2000–01
- Coupe de France: 1998–99, 1999–2000
- Trophée des Champions: 1999, 2001

Manchester City

- Football League Championship: 2001–02

Paris Saint-Germain

- Coupe de France: 2004

=== International ===
France

- UEFA U19 Football Championship: 1997
