= Cédric Schille =

French footballer (born 1975)

Personal information
- Date of birth: 8 November 1975 (age 51)
- Place of birth: Metz, France
- Height: 1.80 m (5 ft 11 in)
- Position: Goalkeeper

Youth career
- RS Magny
- 1993–1994: Metz

Senior career*
Years	Team	Apps	(Gls)
1994–1996	Metz B	31	(0)
1996–1997	CS Blénod	26	(0)
1997–1998	Épinal	2	(0)
1998–2011	Calais	427	(0)
Total		486	(0)
- * Club domestic league appearances and goals

Cédric Schille (born 8 November 1975) is a French former footballer who played as a goalkeeper. He helped amateur side Calais RUFC reach the Coupe de France Final 2000.

Schille retired from football in 2011.

== Honours ==
- Coupe de France runner-up: 2000
