= Grégory Deswarte =

French footballer (born 1976)

Personal information
- Date of birth: 22 June 1976 (age 50)
- Place of birth: Dunkirk, France
- Height: 1.78 m (5 ft 10 in)
- Positions: Midfielder; defender

Senior career*
Years	Team	Apps	(Gls)
1996–1998	Dunkerque		
1998–2001	Calais		
2001–2004	Dunkerque		
- * Club domestic league appearances and goals

Grégory Deswarte (born 22 June 1976) is a French former professional footballer who played as a midfielder and defender.

== Career ==
Deswarte never played in a professional league during his eight-year football career, although he did play in the 2000 Coupe de France Final with Calais RUFC, a match that was won 2–1 by Nantes.

== After football ==
As of 2020, Deswarte has been director of teams of production in the British-Swedish pharmaceutical company AstraZeneca.

== Honours ==
Calais

- Coupe de France runner-up: 1999–2000
