= Alain Caveglia =

French footballer (born 1968)

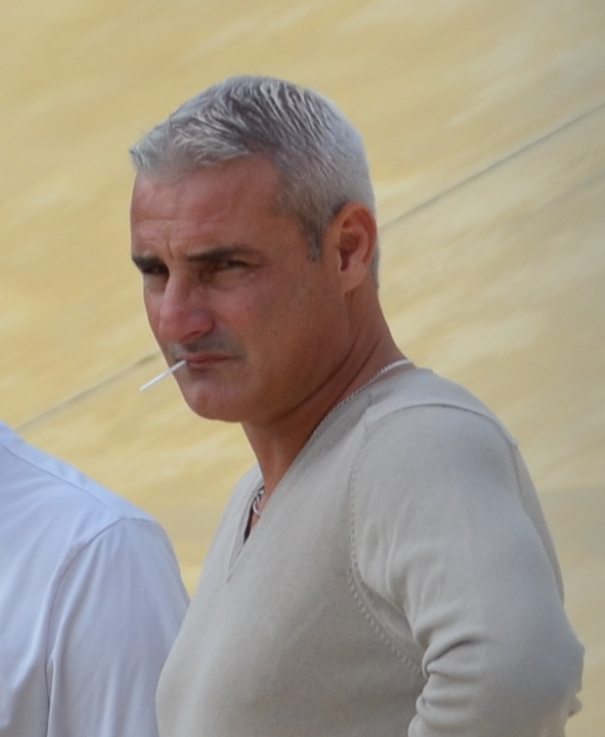
- Caveglia in 2013

Personal information
- Date of birth: 28 March 1968 (age 58)
- Place of birth: Vénissieux, France
- Height: 1.81 m (5 ft 11 in)
- Position: Striker

Team information
- Current team: Olympique Lyon Sud (Advisor)

Youth career
- 1981–1986: Lyon

Senior career*
Years	Team	Apps	(Gls)
1988–1990	Gueugnon	50	(29)
1990–1994	Sochaux	129	(45)
1994–1996	Le Havre	72	(31)
1996–1999	Lyon	112	(47)
2000	Nantes	10	(1)
2000–2002	Le Havre	72	(30)
Total		445	(183)
- * Club domestic league appearances and goals

Alain Caveglia (born 28 March 1968) is a French former professional footballer who played as a striker.

== Career ==
Caveglia was born in Vénissieux, Rhône. A prolific goalscorer, he started at Guegnon, making his Ligue 1 debuts on 21 August 1990 with Sochaux, against Brest. After two more top division seasons at Le Havre he moved to Lyon, being eventually named captain on both teams and being affectionately nicknamed Cavégol in the latter.

In January 2000, Caveglia joined Nantes, going on to win his only professional silverware in his six-month stint, the season's Coupe de France, gaining a penalty in the last minute of a 2–1 final win over amateurs Calais RUFC which was converted by Antoine Sibierski. In July of that year he returned to Le Havre, going on to amass a further 30 Ligue 2 goals (in 2001–02, his 14 helped the side return to the top flight) and subsequently retiring in June 2002, aged 34.

On 19 August 2011, Caveglia was appointed director of football at Caen. He left the club at the end of April 2019, and one month later, he was appointed, still as sporting director, at AS Villers-Houlgate.

== Honours ==
Lyon

- UEFA Intertoto Cup: 1997

Nantes

- Coupe de France: 1999–2000
