= Cédric Jandau =

French footballer (born 1976)

Personal information
- Date of birth: 2 November 1976 (age 50)
- Place of birth: Calais, France
- Height: 1.84 m (6 ft 0 in)
- Position: Midfielder

Senior career*
Years	Team	Apps	(Gls)
1994–2002	Calais		
2002–2006	Gravelines		
2006–2007	Boulogne		
2007–2008	US Castanet		
- * Club domestic league appearances and goals

Cédric Jandau (born 2 November 1976) is a French former professional footballer who played as a midfielder.

== Playing career ==
In his days as a player, Jandau never played in a professional division, reaching the third tier of French football only on two occasions in his career.

In the 1999–2000 Coupe de France semi-final on 12 April 2000, Jandau scored a goal against Bordeaux in a 3–1 win to help his team qualify for the final, while being an amateur side from the fourth division. The ultimate game of the competition was played out between Calais and Nantes; in the end, Les Canaris were victorious by a score of 2–1, with Jandau participating in the match.

== Coaching career ==
Jandau retired from football in 2008, at the age of 31. He became a coach for the U10 and U11 teams at Muret, and was later contacted by Toulouse for a job with the U8 and U9 teams at their club, an offer which he declined. Jandau received a second offer from TFC, this time for the U13 team, and accepted it.

== Honours ==
Calais

- Coupe de France runner-up: 1999–2000
