= Ladislas Lozano =

Football player and manager (born 1952)

Personal information
- Full name: Ladislao Lozano Léon
- Date of birth: 24 June 1952 (age 74)
- Place of birth: Valhermoso de la Fuente, Spain
- Height: 1.68 m (5 ft 6 in)
- Position: Forward

Senior career*
Years	Team	Apps	(Gls)
1970–1971	Real Santander		
1971–1972	Paris-Joinville		
1972–1976	Abbeville		
1976–1978	Amiens		
1978–1983	Abbeville		
1983–1986	AS Trouville-Deauville		
1986–1988	Friville-Escarbotin		

Managerial career
- 1983–1986: AS Trouville-Deauville
- 1986–1988: Friville-Escarbotin
- 1988–1994: Saint-Omer
- 1994–1995: Berck-sur-Mer
- 1995–2001: Calais
- 2001–2002: Wydad Casablanca
- 2002: Créteil
- 2002–2003: Al-Khor
- 2003–2004: Reims
- 2004–2006: Al-Rayyan
- 2007: Wydad Casablanca
- 2007: Al-Khor
- 2007–2009: Al-Saliya
- 2011: CA Bordj Bou Arreridj
- 2012: ES Zarzis
- 2013–2014: Muaither SC
- * Club domestic league appearances and goals

Ladislas Lozano (born 24 June 1952 as Ladislao Lozano Léon) is a former football player and manager. Born in Spain, he spent a majority of his career in France. He is best remembered for having guided amateur club Calais RUFC to the 2000 Coupe de France final.

== Managerial career ==
On 22 January 2011, Lozano signed a six-month contract with Algerian club CA Bordj Bou Arreridj. However, he resigned from his position just a month later.

On 19 June 2013, Lozano agreed a deal to become the new head coach of the newly promoted Qatar Stars League outfit Muaither SC. Prior to being named Muaither's coach, he formerly had coaching stints at several clubs in Qatar, including Al-Khor, Al-Rayyan and Al-Saliya.

== Honours ==
=== Managerial ===
Calais

- Coupe de France runner-up: 1999–2000

Al-Khor

- Sheikh Jassim Cup: 2002
