= 1999 Trophée des Champions =

- Event: Trophée des Champions
Bordeaux	Nantes
0	1
- Date: 24 July 1999
- Venue: Stade de la Licorne, Amiens, France
- Referee: Stéphane Bré
- Attendance: 11,858

The 1999 Trophée des Champions was a football match held at Stade de la Licorne, Amiens on 24 July 1999, that saw 1998–99 Coupe de France winners FC Nantes defeat 1998–99 Division 1 champions FC Girondins de Bordeaux 1–0.

== Match details ==
24 July 1999
21:00 CET

Bordeaux	0–1	Nantes
	Report	Monterrubio 57'

Stade de la Licorne, Amiens
Attendance: 11,858
Referee: Stéphane Bré

BORDEAUX:
GK	16	(France) Ulrich Ramé
RB	14	(France) François Grenet
CB	21	(France) Kodjo Afanou
CB	24	(France) Hervé Alicarte	(yellow card) 58'
LB	5	(France) Jérôme Bonnissel
MF	6	(France) Jean-Christophe Rouvière		(substituted off) 73'
MF	7	(France) Michel Pavon (c)	(yellow card) 77'
MF	8	(France) Johan Micoud
MF	10	(France) Stéphane Ziani
FW	9	(France) Lilian Laslandes
FW	11	(France) Sylvain Wiltord
Substitutes:
GK	1	(France) Teddy Richert
DF	4	(Federal Republic of Yugoslavia) Niša Saveljić
DF	18	(Ivory Coast) Lassina Diabaté
MF	20	(France) Laurent Batlles
FW	27	(Guinea) Pascal Feindouno		(substituted on) 73'
Manager:
(France) Élie Baup

NANTES:
GK	1	(France) Mickaël Landreau (c)
RB	19	(France) Jean-Marc Chanelet
CB	2	(Argentina) Néstor Fabbri
CB	15	(France) Nicolas Savinaud
LB	6	(Cameroon) Salomon Olembé
CM	9	(France) Eric Carrière
CM	12	(France) Sébastien Piocelle
CM	20	(France) Charles Devineau	(substituted off) 73'
RW	8	(France) Frédéric Da Rocha
LW	18	(France) Olivier Monterrubio	(substituted off) 77'
FW	10	(France) Antoine Sibierski
Substitutes:
GK	16	(France) Willy Grondin
DF	21	(France) Pascal Delhommeau
MF	14	(France) Mehdi Leroy	(substituted on) 73'
FW	25	(Cameroon) Patrick Suffo	(substituted on) 77'
FW	28	(France) Hassan Ahamada
Manager:
(France) Raynald Denoueix

MATCH OFFICIALS

- Assistant referees:
  - Nelly Viennot
  - Alain Augu
- Fourth official: Laurent Duhamel

== See also ==
- 1999–2000 French Division 1
- 1999–2000 Coupe de France
- 1999–2000 FC Nantes season
