= Jocelyn Merlen =

French footballer (born 1972)

Personal information
- Date of birth: 8 November 1972 (age 53)
- Place of birth: Calais, France
- Height: 1.78 m (5 ft 10 in)
- Position: Right-back

Senior career*
Years	Team	Apps	(Gls)
1993–2003	Calais		
2003–2006	Dunkerque		
2006–2012	Gravelines		

Managerial career
- Marck
- –2023: Grand Calais Pascal FC
- * Club domestic league appearances and goals

Jocelyn Merlen (born 24 November 1972) is a French former footballer who played as a right-back.

== Playing career ==
Merlen never played in a professional division during his career, but participated in the 2000 Coupe de France final with Calais. The final score eventually turned out to be a 2–1 victory in the favor of Nantes. Earlier in the tournament, he scored the game-winning goal off a free-kick in their 2–1 win over top-flight Strasbourg in the quarter-finals.

Merlen participated in a commemorative rematch against Nantes 20 years later at the Stade de l'Épopée in Calais.

== Managerial career ==
In April 2023, Merlen was sacked as the manager of Régional 1 club Grand Calais Pascal FC.

== Honours ==
Calais

- Coupe de France runner-up: 1999–2000
