= Emmanuel Vasseur =

French footballer (born 1976)

Personal information
- Date of birth: 3 September 1976 (age 50)
- Place of birth: France
- Position: Midfielder

Senior career*
Years	Team	Apps	(Gls)
1999–2001	Calais		
2001	Leyton Orient	2	(0)
2001–2002	Calais		
2002-2003	RC Paris		
2003–2004	Canet Roussillon		
2004–20xx	Calais		
20xx–2009	Gravelines		
2009–2014	Calais	45	(0)
201x–201x	Amicale Pascal Calais	10+	(2+)
201x–201x	Fort Vert		
- * Club domestic league appearances and goals

Emmanuel Vasseur (born 3 September 1976) is a French retired footballer who played as a midfielder.

== Career ==
Masseur started his career in Calais RUFC, where he made it to the 2000 Coupe de France Final. In 2001, Vasseur signed for Leyton Orient in the English Football League Third Division, where he made two appearances and scored zero goals. After that, he played for French clubs Calais RUFC, Racing Club de France Football, Canet Roussiillon, Union Sportive Gravelines Football, Amicale Pascal Calais and Fort Vert before retiring.
