= Eduardo Oliveira (footballer, born 1972) =

Brazilian footballer

Personal information
- Full name: Eduardo Oliveira dos Santos
- Date of birth: 28 September 1972 (age 54)
- Place of birth: São Paulo, Brazil
- Height: 1.87 m (6 ft 2 in)
- Position: Defender

Team information
- Current team: Thouars (assistant); Thouars B (head coach)

Senior career*
Years	Team	Apps	(Gls)
1989–1991	Corinthians		
1991–1994	Île-Rousse		
1994–1995	Martigues B		
1995–1997	Istres		
1997–2002	Sedan	106+ (Note: Statistics are missing for the 1997–98 season.)	(1+)
2002–2003	Saint-Étienne	50	(1)
2003–2004	Leiria	11	(0)
2004–2007	Brest	72	(1)
2007–2008	Saumur		
2008–2012	Thouars		

Managerial career
- 2008–2019: Thouars U19
- 2019–: Thouars (assistant)
- 2021–: Thouars B
- * Club domestic league appearances and goals

Eduardo Oliveira dos Santos (born 28 September 1972), known as Eduardo Oliveira, is a Brazilian former professional footballer who played as a defender. As of 2021, he simultaneously works as an assistant coach for Thouars and as the head coach of the club's reserve team.

He acquired French nationality by naturalization on 17 June 1998.

== Honours ==
Île-Rousse

- Division 4: 1992–93

Sedan

- Coupe de France runner-up: 1998–99

Saint-Étienne

- Ligue 2: 2003–04
