= Éric Crosnier =

French footballer (born 1972)

Personal information
- Date of birth: 22 December 1972 (age 53)
- Place of birth: Sainte-Maure-de-Touraine, France
- Height: 1.75 m (5 ft 9 in)
- Position: Midfielder

Senior career*
Years	Team	Apps	(Gls)
1991–1993	Tours	33+ (Note: Statistics are incomplete for the 1991–92 season.)	(0+)
1993–1994	Beauvais	29	(0)
1994–1997	Poitiers		
1997–1998	Saint-Denis Saint-Leu		
1998–2000	Sedan	43	(3)
2000–2002	Laval	21	(0)
2002–2003	Rethel SF		
2003–2004	Charleville		
2004–2007	Prix-lès-Méziéres		

Managerial career
- 2008–2009: Prix-lès-Mézières (assistant)
- 2009–2010: Prix-lès-Mézières
- 2010–2011: Charleville
- * Club domestic league appearances and goals

Éric Crosnier (born 22 December 1972) is a French former professional footballer who played as a midfielder. In his career, he most notably played for Tours, Beauvais, Poitiers, Sedan, and Laval.

== Honours ==
Sedan

- Coupe de France runner-up: 1998–99
