= Nicolas Savinaud =

French former professional footballer (born 1975)

Personal information
- Date of birth: 20 November 1975 (age 50)
- Place of birth: Fontenay-le-Comte, France
- Height: 1.85 m (6 ft 1 in)
- Position: Defender

Youth career
- 1991–1995: Nantes

Senior career*
Years	Team	Apps	(Gls)
1995–2007	Nantes	315	(20)
2007–2008	Guingamp	45	(7)
2009	Vannes	14	(0)
2009–2011	Carquefou	8	(0)
Total		382	(27)
- * Club domestic league appearances and goals

Nicolas Savinaud (born 20 November 1975) is a French former professional footballer who spent most of his career at FC Nantes. Mostly deployed as a defender, he also played in other positions.

== Career ==
Born in Fontenay-le-Comte, Vendée, Savinaud began his career in 1991 in the youth teams of FC Nantes. In the 1995–96 season he was promoted to the first team. He played in the victorious 1999 and 2000 Coupe de France campaigns and contributed 25 appearances as his side won the 2000–01 French Division 1. He also won the Trophée des Champions in 1999 and 2001, scoring in the 2001 edition.

In June 2007, with his contract running out, Savinaud moved to Guingamp as a free agent, where he played until 14 January 2009 when he moved to Vannes OC.

On 9 August 2009, he left Vannes OC and signed for USJA Carquefou.

== Style of play ==
Savinaud was well known for his ability to play in any position on the field, and was called the "homme à tout faire".

== Career statistics ==
Appearances and goals by club, season and competition
Season	Club	League			National cup		League cup		Europe		Total	
Season	Club	Division	Apps	Goals	Apps	Goals	Apps	Goals	Apps	Goals	Apps	Goals
Nantes	1995–1996	Ligue 1	8	1	0	0	0	0	1	0	9	1
Nantes	1996–1997	Ligue 1	30	2	0	0	0	0	–	–	30	2
Nantes	1997–1998	Ligue 1	31	2	0	0	0	0	2	0	33	2
Nantes	1998–1999	Ligue 1	21	1	5	2	0	0	–	–	26	3
Nantes	1999–2000	Ligue 1	28	1	4	0	1	0	5	0	38	1
Nantes	2000–2001	Ligue 1	25	2	4	1	3	1	2	0	34	4
Nantes	2001–2002	Ligue 1	25	2	1	0	2	1	5	0	33	3
Nantes	2002–2003	Ligue 1	29	2	1	0	2	0	–	–	32	2
Nantes	2003–2004	Ligue 1	26	1	3	0	3	1	–	–	32	2
Nantes	2004–2005	Ligue 1	36	6	3	1	2	0	–	–	41	7
Nantes	2005–2006	Ligue 1	28	0	4	0	2	0	–	–	34	0
Nantes	2006–2007	Ligue 1	20	0	3	1	0	0	–	–	23	1
Nantes	Total		307	20	28	5	15	3	15	0	365	28
Guingamp	2007–2008	Ligue 2	38	7	3	2	1	1	–	–	42	10
Guingamp	2008–2009	Ligue 2	7	0	1	0	0	0	–	–	8	0
Guingamp	Total		45	7	4	2	1	1	0	0	50	10
Vannes	2009	Ligue 2	14	0	0	0	1	0	–	–	15	0
Career total			366	27	32	7	17	4	15	0	430	38

== Honours ==
Nantes

- Ligue 1: 2001
- Coupe de France: 1999, 2000
- Trophée des Champions: 1999, 2001
- Cup of the Alps runners-up: 2004
