= Mathieu Berson =

French footballer (born 1980)

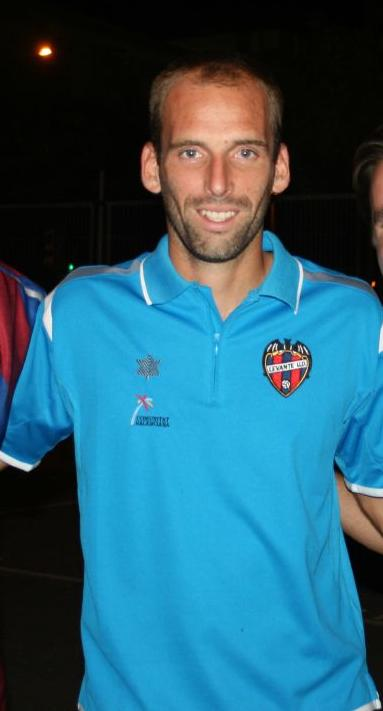
- Berson with Levante in 2007

Personal information
- Full name: Mathieu Michel Berson
- Date of birth: 23 February 1980 (age 46)
- Place of birth: Vannes, Morbihan, France
- Height: 1.80 m (5 ft 11 in)
- Position: Midfielder

Youth career
- 1997–1999: Nantes

Senior career*
Years	Team	Apps	(Gls)
1999–2004	Nantes	122	(7)
2004–2006	Aston Villa	11	(0)
2005–2006	→ Auxerre (loan)	27	(0)
2006–2008	Levante	51	(1)
2008–2010	Toulouse	28	(0)
2011–2013	Vannes	49	(0)
Total		288	(8)

International career
2002	France U21	4	(0)
Medal record
Men's football
Representing France
UEFA European Under-21 Championship
Runner-up	2002
- * Club domestic league appearances and goals

Mathieu Michel Berson (born 23 February 1980) is a French former professional footballer who played as a midfielder. Berson played for Nantes, Aston Villa, Auxerre, Levante, Toulouse, and Vannes before retiring in 2013. He was a member of the successful Nantes side that won the Coupe de France in 1999 and 2000, followed by the Division 1 title in 2001, and the Trophée des Champions in 2002.

Berson played youth football for France, playing a key role in their run to the final of the 2002 UEFA European Under-21 Championship where they lost on penalties to Czechia's U21 side.

== Career ==
Berson began his career with Nantes and made his senior debut during the 1999–2000 season, going on to start in the victorious 2000 Coupe de France Final. The following campaign, Nantes were crowned champions of France for the eight time, with Berson making 29 league appearances. He also played as Nantes won the 2001 Trophée des Champions. Having featured for the club consistently over a four-year period, he was transferred to Premier League club Aston Villa in the summer of 2004. In January 2005, Villa signed Eric Djemba-Djemba in an attempt to replicate the successful partnership they had formed at Nantes, where they played 50 games together. However, six months later, Berson was back in France, having joined Auxerre on a season-long loan. In the summer of 2006, he was transferred to La Liga side Levante. He played regularly for the next two seasons before returning to France with Toulouse in 2008. Released by Toulouse in the summer of 2010 due to budget cuts, Berson remained without a club until signing a two-year contract with Vannes in June 2011.
