= Jean-Jacques Allais =

French footballer (born 1969)

Personal information
- Full name: Jean-Jacques Allais
- Date of birth: 17 January 1969 (age 57)
- Place of birth: Bolbec, France
- Height: 1.78 m (5 ft 10 in)
- Position: Striker

Senior career*
Years	Team	Apps	(Gls)
1986–1993	Valenciennes	59	(7)
1992–1993	→ Dunkerque (loan)	20	(4)
1993–1994	Niort	31	(9)
1994–1995	Châtellerault	24	(8)
1996–1997	Stade Tamponnaise		
1997–1999	Wasquehal	73	(16)
1999–2000	Veria	14	(2)
2000–2001	Calais	26	(6)
- * Club domestic league appearances and goals

Jean-Jacques Allais (born 17 January 1969) is a French former professional footballer.

Allais spent one season with Veria F.C., making 14 appearances in the Greek second division.
