= Bruno Pabois =

French footballer (born 1969)

Personal information
- Date of birth: 23 October 1969 (age 57)
- Place of birth: Saint-Nazaire, France
- Height: 1.72 m (5 ft 8 in)
- Position: Midfielder

Youth career
- 1986–1989: Brest

Senior career*
| Years | Team | Apps | (Gls) |
| 1989–1991 | Brest | 43 | (0) |
| 1991–1995 | Nîmes | 83 | (3) |
| 1995–1996 | Dunkerque | 27 | (1) |
| 1996–1999 | Sedan | | |
| 1999–2001 | Brest | | |
| Total | | 178+ | (4+) |

International career
| 1990–1991 | France U21 | 10 | (0) |

Managerial career
- 2001–2002: Brest (assistant)
- 2002–2006: Brest B
- 2007–2010: Landerneau FC
- 2011–2014: Espérance de Plouguerneau
- * Club domestic league appearances and goals

Bruno Pabois (born 23 October 1969) is a French former professional football player and manager. As a player, he was a midfielder.

== Honours ==
Sedan

- Coupe de France runner-up: 1998–99

Brest

- Championnat de France Amateur: 1999–2000

France U21

- Toulon Tournament runner-up: 1991
