= Luis Satorra =

French football player and manager (born 1969)

Personal information
- Date of birth: 13 September 1969 (age 57)
- Place of birth: Rennes, France
- Height: 1.86 m (6 ft 1 in)
- Position: Defender

Youth career
- 1986–1989: Montpellier

Senior career*
Years	Team	Apps	(Gls)
1989–1997	Stade Briochin		
1997–2002	Sedan	106+ (Note: Statistics are missing for the 1997–98 season.)	(6+)
2002–2004	Amiens	64	(4)
2004–2005	Lunel		

Managerial career
- 2005–2006: Lunel (assistant)
- 2006–2007: Lunel
- * Club domestic league appearances and goals

Luis Satorra (born 13 September 1969) is a French former professional football player and manager. As a player, he was a defender.

== Honours ==
Sedan

- Coupe de France runner-up: 1998–99
