= Salomon Olembé =

Cameroonian footballer (born 1980)

Personal information
- Full name: René Salomon Olembé-Olembé
- Date of birth: 8 December 1980 (age 45)
- Place of birth: Yaoundé, Cameroon
- Height: 1.71 m (5 ft 7 in)
- Position: Left midfielder

Youth career
- Nantes

Senior career*
Years	Team	Apps	(Gls)
1997–2002	Nantes	103	(7)
2001–2002	→ Marseille (loan)	8	(0)
2002–2007	Marseille	67	(1)
2003–2004	→ Leeds United (loan)	12	(0)
2005–2006	→ Al Rayyan (loan)	14	(3)
2007–2008	Wigan Athletic	8	(0)
2009	Kayserispor	17	(1)
2010	AEL	0	(0)
Total		229	(12)

International career
1997–2007	Cameroon	64	(5)
Medal record
Representing Cameroon
Africa Cup of Nations
Winner	2000 Ghana-Nigeria
Winner	2002 Mali
- * Club domestic league appearances and goals

René Salomon Olembé-Olembé (born 8 December 1980) is a Cameroonian former professional footballer who played as a left midfielder.

== Club career ==
Olembé started his career with Nantes, where he contributed 30 appearances as his side won 2000–01 French Division 1. He also played in the victorious 1999 and 2000 Coupe de France finals and the 1999 Trophée des Champions. He then transferred to Marseille in 2002. While at Marseille he spent a season on loan at English Premiership strugglers Leeds United and a season at Qatari club Al Rayyan.

After leaving Marseille permanently in 2007, Olembé spent the summer on trial at Premiership newcomers Derby County, where he scored in a friendly match against Burton Albion. However, he was not offered a contract by Derby and, on 4 September, he was snapped up by Wigan Athletic manager Chris Hutchings on a one-year initial contract. He was signed as a replacement for the recently departed Leighton Baines, but only made eight appearances for the Lancashire club.

In April 2008, it was revealed that Olembé would transfer to Turkish club Kayserispor.

In January 2010, in the winter break of his second season in the Süper Lig, Olembé transferred to Greek side AEL, but spent only a few months with the club before joining English Championship team Burnley on trial in March. He played in a reserve game against Manchester City but was substituted at half-time.

== International career ==
Olembé holds Cameroonian and French nationalities. He acquired French nationality by naturalization on 17 June 1999.

He made his debut for the Cameroon national team in 1997, and made a total of 64 appearances for his country. He represented Cameroon at the 1998 FIFA World Cup and the 2004 African Cup of Nations.

== Career statistics ==
=== International ===
Cameroon score shown first

No.	Date	Opponent	Result	Competition
1	23 April 2000	Somalia	3–0	2002 FIFA World Cup qualification
2	29 January 2002	Togo	3–0	2002 Africa Cup of Nations
3	7 February 2002	Mali	3–0	2002 Africa Cup of Nations
4	7 February 2002	Mali	3–0	2002 Africa Cup of Nations

== Honours ==
Marseille

- UEFA Intertoto Cup: 2005

Cameroon

- African Cup of Nations: 2000, 2002
