= Jean-Marc Chanelet =

French footballer (born 1968)

Personal information
- Date of birth: 23 July 1968 (age 58)
- Place of birth: Paris, France
- Height: 1.78 m (5 ft 10 in)
- Position: Defender

Senior career*
Years	Team	Apps	(Gls)
1989–1993	Istres	125	(5)
1993–1995	Nîmes	73	(3)
1995–2000	Nantes	124	(3)
2000–2003	Lyon	59	(3)
2003–2005	Grenoble	39	(0)
Total		420	(14)
- * Club domestic league appearances and goals

Jean-Marc Chanelet (born 23 July 1968) is a French former professional footballer who played as a defender.

== Honours ==
Nantes

- Coupe de France: 1998–99, 1999–2000
- Trophée des Champions: 1999

Lyon

- Ligue 1: 2001–02, 2002–03
- Coupe de la Ligue: 2000-01
- Trophée des Champions: 2002
