= Olivier Monterrubio =

French footballer (born 1976)

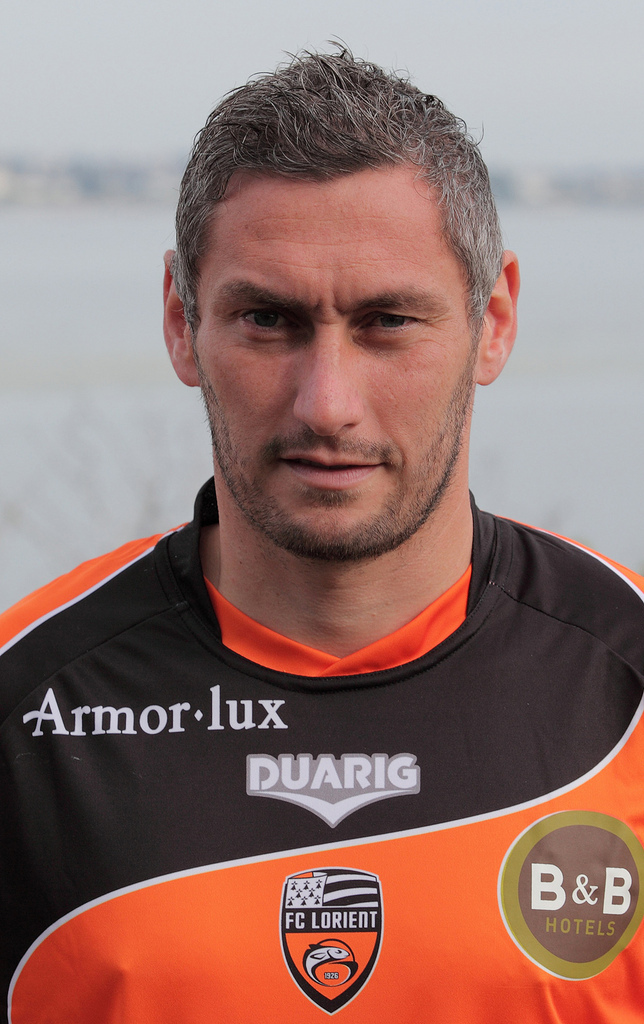
- Monterrubio with Lorient in 2010

Personal information
- Date of birth: 8 August 1976 (age 50)
- Place of birth: Gaillac, France
- Height: 1.70 m (5 ft 7 in)
- Positions: Midfielder; winger

Senior career*
Years	Team	Apps	(Gls)
1996–2001	Nantes	91	(28)
2001–2006	Rennes	215	(41)
2007–2008	Lens	67	(12)
2008–2009	Sion	35	(11)
2009–2011	Lorient	20	(4)
Total		428	(96)

International career
1999–2007	France B	3	(3)
- * Club domestic league appearances and goals

Olivier Monterrubio (born 8 August 1976) is a French former professional footballer who played as a midfielder. He played for Nantes, Rennes, Lens, Sion in Switzerland, and Lorient.

== Club career ==
=== Nantes ===
Monterrubio started his professional career at Nantes in 1996. Product of the famed "Centre of Formation" of Nantes, he was in the same crop of players such as Mickaël Landreau. He was an essential part of the squad in the 1998–99 season, and his winning penalty handed Nantes the Coupe de France title in 1999. He also scored the winning goal in the 1999 Trophée des Champions and played as a substitute when Nantes won the 2000 Coupe de France Final. Finally, in 2001, Monterrubio became a Ligue 1 winner with Les Canaries.

=== Rennes ===
In the summer of 2001, Monterrubio signed for fierce rivals Rennes. Despite having a quiet start to his spell at the club, he became one of their key players, establishing a deadly partnership with Swiss striker Alexander Frei. In the 2004–05 season, he led Ligue 1 in assists while Frei was the top scorer. Such was his influence, that he has inherited the captain's armband from Cyril Jeunechamp.

=== Lens ===
In the last few hours of the January 2007 transfer window, Monterrubio signed for RC Lens as a replacement for Olivier Thomert, who moved in the opposite direction. On 3 February 2007, he played his first Ligue 1 match for Lens against Valenciennes. During this period, he had to fight for his first team place with the Ivorian midfielder Kanga Akalé. He struck up a strong partnership with Nadir Belhadj upon the Algerian left-back's arrival at the club in January 2008, but the team were relegated to Ligue 2 at the end of the season despite Monterrubio's fine form.

=== Sion ===
Monterrubio signed a two-year contract with Swiss side Sion during the summer of 2008.

=== Lorient ===
On 28 June 2009, Monterrubio signed a contract between 30 June 2011 with Lorient leaving Sion after one year.

== International career ==
Born in France, Monterrubio is of Spanish descent. In his prime, Monterrubio was among the finest players of his unique kind. Although he did not win a single national team cap, he did receive three call-ups to the France B team, scoring in all 3 of his appearances.

== Style of play ==
Monterrubio was an accomplished left winger, but had also been featured as a striker and attacking midfielder in the early of his career. He specialized in set-pieces, especially at penalty-taking. He led Ligue 1 in assists in 2004–05 and 2005–06 and was runner-up in 2006–07.

== Honours ==
Nantes

- Ligue 1: 2000–01
- Coupe de France: 1998–99, 1999–2000
- Trophée des Champions: 1999

Sion

- Swiss Cup: 2008–09
