= Mehdi Leroy =

French footballer (born 1978)

Personal information
- Date of birth: 18 April 1978 (age 48)
- Place of birth: Saint-Nazaire, France
- Height: 1.78 m (5 ft 10 in)
- Position: Midfielder

Senior career*
Years	Team	Apps	(Gls)
1996–2001	Nantes	36	(2)
2001–2003	Troyes	26	(1)
2003–2005	Amiens	56	(9)
2005–2007	Laval	68	(4)
2007–2008	Paris FC	7	(0)
2008–2009	Vannes	1	(0)
2009	Cholet	30	(2)
Total		224	(18)

International career
- France U20
- * Club domestic league appearances and goals

Mehdi Leroy (born 18 April 1978) is a French former professional footballer who played as a midfielder.

Leroy helped Troyes become one of the winners of the 2001 UEFA Intertoto Cup. In the final Troyes beat Newcastle United on away goals after the second leg finished 4–4 at St James' Park; Leroy scored one of Troyes' goals. He also played as a substitute when Nantes won the 1999 Trophée des Champions.

== Honours ==
Nantes

- Trophée des Champions: 1999

Troyes

- UEFA Intertoto Cup: 2001
