= Mohamed Haddadou =

French footballer (born 1974)

Personal information
- Full name: Mohamed Haddadou
- Date of birth: 24 December 1974 (age 51)
- Place of birth: Saint-Germain-en-Laye, France
- Height: 1.74 m (5 ft 8 1/2 in)
- Position: Midfielder

Senior career*
Years	Team	Apps	(Gls)
1992–1997	USL Dunkerque	63	(6)
1997–1998	Tours FC	34	(14)
1998–2002	Le Mans Union Club 72	119	(9)
2002–2005	Stade Reims	68	(8)
2005–2008	AS Poissy	73	(10)
- * Club domestic league appearances and goals

Mohamed Haddadou (born 24 December 1974) is a French former professional footballer who played as a midfielder. He played in Ligue 2 with USL Dunkerque, Le Mans Union Club 72 and Stade Reims.
