= Jérôme Dutitre =

French footballer (born 1975)

Personal information
- Date of birth: 10 August 1975 (age 51)
- Place of birth: Abbeville, France
- Height: 1.75 m (5 ft 9 in)
- Position: Forward

Youth career
- 1981–1991: Abbeville
- 1991–1993: Strasbourg

Senior career*
Years	Team	Apps	(Gls)
1993–1997	Strasbourg	1	(0)
1997–1999	Angoulême	23	(3)
1999–2007	Calais	151	(50)
Total		176	(55)

International career
1992	France U17		

Managerial career
- 2010–2015: Abbeville
- 2015–2016: Saint-Omer
- 2016–2017: Calais U19
- 2018: Gravelines
- 2019–2020: Reims Sainte-Anne U16
- 2020–2023: Reims Sainte-Anne
- 2023–: FC Cormontreuil
- * Club domestic league appearances and goals

Jérôme Dutitre (born 10 August 1975) is a French football manager and former player.

== Early life ==
Dutitre was born in 1975 in Abbeville, France.

== Playing career ==
Dutitre started his career with Division 1 side Strasbourg. After that, he signed for third tier side Angoulême, where he played for two seasons. After that, he signed for fourth tier side CRUFC, helping the club reach the 2000 Coupe de France final, where he scored the first goal during a 2–1 loss to Ligue 1 side Nantes. He retired as a footballer in 2007.

== Style of play ==
Dutitre mainly operated as a center forward.

== Post-playing career ==
After retiring from football, Dutitre worked at the Caisse centrale d'activités sociales in Crépy, France, with former teammate Christophe Hogard.

== Managerial career ==
After retiring from football, Dutitre obtained his managerial licenses and was appointed player-manager of Abbeville in 2010, before being appointed manager of Saint Omer in 2015 and working as youth manager of CRUFC until the club's dissolution in 2017. In 2021, he was appointed manager of Reims Sainte-Anne. In 2023, he was appointed manager of Cormontreuil.

== Personal life ==
Dutitre has one daughter and two sons; his daughter Noa was crowned Miss Champagne-Ardenne 2023 and competed at Miss France 2024.
