= Frédéric Da Rocha =

French footballer (born 1974)

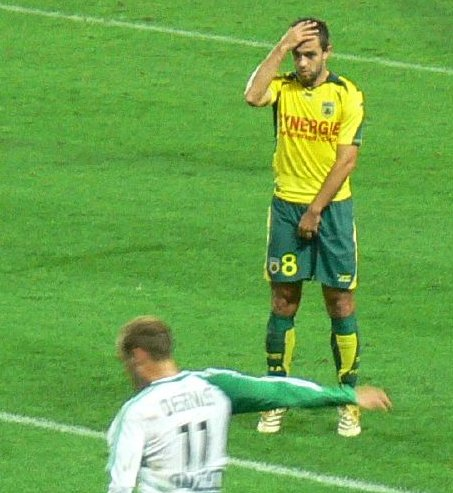

Personal information
- Full name: Frédéric Da Rocha
- Date of birth: 16 September 1974 (age 52)
- Place of birth: Cenon, France
- Height: 1.77 m (5 ft 10 in)
- Position: Midfielder

Youth career
- 1991–1996: Nantes

Senior career*
Years	Team	Apps	(Gls)
1996–2009	Nantes	409	(46)
2009–2010	Boulogne	30	(0)
2010–2011	Carquefou	17	(0)
Total		456	(46)
- * Club domestic league appearances and goals as of 16:48, 14 September 2011 (UTC)

Frédéric Da Rocha (born 16 September 1974) is a French former professional footballer who played as a midfielder.

== Career ==
=== Nantes ===
From 1996 to 2009 he was a key player for Nantes, winning the Coupe de France in 1998–99 and 1999–2000, the national championship in 2000–01 and the Trophée des Champions in 1999 and 2001. He was an attacking midfielder and winger who was renowned for his technique. In his time with Nantes, Da Rocha made over 400 appearances for the club.

=== Boulogne and Carquefou ===
In the summer of 2009, he joined newly promoted Ligue 1 side Boulogne. After one season with Boulogne, Da Rocha signed for Championnat de France Amateur club Carquefou. He finished his playing career at the end of the 2010–11 season.

== Personal life ==
Born in France, Da Rocha is of Portuguese descent. Frédéric's younger brother, Bruno Da Rocha, was also a professional footballer.
