= Eric Carrière =

French footballer (born 1973)

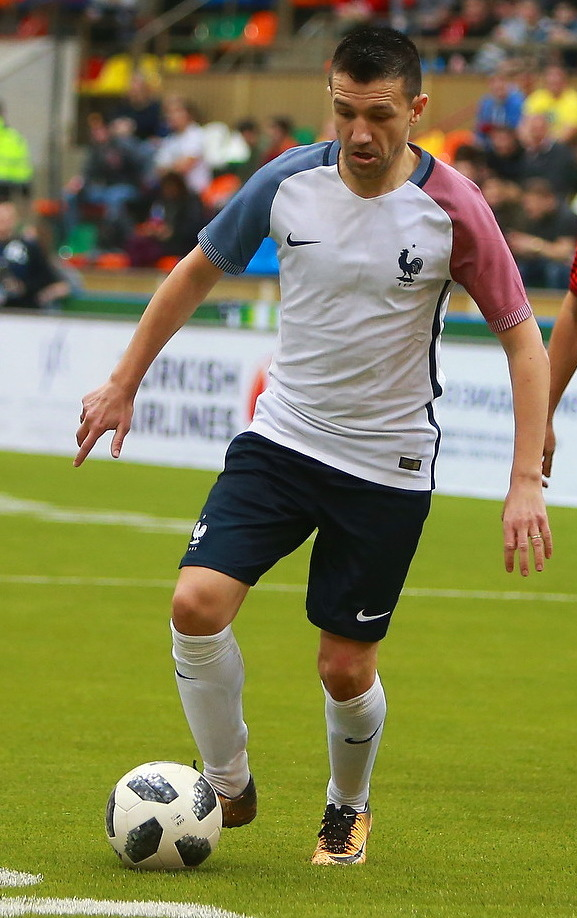
- Carrière in 2018

Personal information
- Full name: Eric Gérard Carrière
- Date of birth: 24 May 1973 (age 53)
- Place of birth: Foix, Ariège, France
- Height: 1.73 m (5 ft 8 in)
- Position: Midfielder

Youth career
- 1978–1981: US Villenave-d'Ornon
- 1981–1992: CS Auch
- 1992–1995: Muret
- 1995–1996: Nantes

Senior career*
Years	Team	Apps	(Gls)
1996–2001	Nantes	128	(12)
2001–2004	Lyon	92	(12)
2004–2008	Lens	114	(5)
2008–2010	Dijon	67	(7)
Total		401	(36)

International career
2001–2006	France	10	(5)
Medal record
Men's football
Representing France
FIFA Confederations Cup
Winner	2001
- * Club domestic league appearances and goals

Eric Gérard Carrière (born 24 May 1973) is a French former professional footballer who played as a midfielder for Nantes, Lyon, Lens, and Dijon.

== Club career ==
Carrière started his professional career at Nantes with whom he won his first Ligue 1 title in 2001. In 2001, he moved to Lyon where he won three more Ligue 1 titles in 2002, 2003 and 2004. In 2004 he signed with Lens. After Lens suffered relegation, he played for Dijon after signing a two-year contract on 26 June 2008.

== International career ==
Carrière was capped ten times and scored five goals for the France national team. He gained his first international cap on 30 March 2001 in a 5–0 win over South Korea at Daegu Stadium during the 2001 FIFA Confederations Cup.

== Style of play ==
Carrière was a skilful playmaker who was adept at taking free-kicks, penalties, and corners for his team, as well as scoring from the run of play, although he was primarily known for defence splitting passes.

== Career statistics ==
=== Club ===
Appearances and goals by club, season and competition
Club	Season	League			Cup (Note: Includes Coupe de France and Coupe de la Ligue.)		Continental (Note: Includes UEFA Champions League, UEFA Cup and UEFA Intertoto-Cup.)		Total	
Club	Season	Division	Apps	Goals	Apps	Goals	Apps	Goals	Apps	Goals
Nantes	1996–97	Division 1	2	0	1	0	3	0	6	0
Nantes	1997–98	Division 1	27	1	1	0	1	0	29	1
Nantes	1998–99	Division 1	33	1	7	0	–		40	1
Nantes	1999–00	Division 1	32	5	7	2	6	1	45	8
Nantes	2000–01	Division 1	33	5	8	2	8	1	49	8
Nantes	2001–02	Division 1	1	0	–		–		1	0
Nantes	Total		128	12	24	4	18	2	158	18
Lyon	2001–02	Division 1	27	4	4	0	9	4	40	8
Lyon	2002–03	Ligue 1	37	6	2	0	7	2	46	8
Lyon	2003–04	Ligue 1	28	2	3	0	6	0	37	2
Lyon	Total		92	12	9	0	22	6	123	18
Lens	2004–05	Ligue 1	33	3	4	0	–		37	3
Lens	2005–06	Ligue 1	26	0	2	0	12	0	40	0
Lens	2006–07	Ligue 1	32	2	5	1	9	0	46	3
Lens	2007–08	Ligue 1	23	0	6	2	6	2	35	4
Lens	Total		114	5	17	3	27	2	158	10
Dijon	2008–09	Ligue 2	36	7	2	0	–		38	7
Dijon	2009–10	Ligue 2	31	0	2	1	–		33	1
Dijon	Total		67	7	4	1	0	0	71	8
Career total			401	36	54	8	67	10	522	54

=== International ===
Appearances and goals by national team and year
National team	Year	Apps	Goals
France	2001	5	2
France	2002	5	3
Total		10	5

Scores and results list France's goal tally first, score column indicates score after each Carrière goal.

List of international goals scored by Eric Carrière
No.	Date	Venue	Opponent	Score	Result	Competition	Ref.
1	3 June 2001	Ulsan Munsu Football Stadium, Ulsan, South Korea	Mexico	2–0	4–0	2001 FIFA Confederations Cup	
2	3 June 2001	Ulsan Munsu Football Stadium, Ulsan, South Korea	Mexico	4–0	4–0	2001 FIFA Confederations Cup	
3	16 October 2002	National Stadium, Ta' Qali, Malta	Malta	4–0	4–0	UEFA Euro 2004 qualifying	
4	20 November 2002	Stade de France, Paris, France	Serbia and Montenegro	1–0	3–0	Friendly	
5	20 November 2002	Stade de France, Paris, France	Serbia and Montenegro	2–0	3–0	Friendly	

== Honours ==
Nantes

- Division 1: 2000–01
- Coupe de France: 1998–99, 1999–2000
- Trophée des Champions: 1999

Lyon

- Division/Ligue 1: 2001–02, 2002–03, 2003–04
- Trophée des Champions: 2002, 2003

Lens

- UEFA Intertoto Cup: 2005

France

- FIFA Confederations Cup: 2001

Individual

- Division 1 Player of the Year: 2001
- FIFA Confederations Cup Silver Shoe: 2001
