= Raynald Denoueix =

French football player and manager (born 1948)

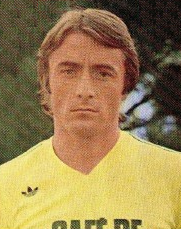
- Denoueix in 1975

Personal information
- Full name: Raynald Denoueix
- Date of birth: 14 May 1948 (age 78)
- Place of birth: Rouen, France
- Position: Defender

Senior career*
Years	Team	Apps	(Gls)
1966–1979	Nantes		

Managerial career
- 1982–1997: Nantes (youth academy)
- 1997–2001: Nantes
- 2002–2004: Real Sociedad
- * Club domestic league appearances and goals

Raynald Denoueix (French pronunciation: [dənwɛ]; born 14 May 1948) is a French football manager and former player.

Born in Rouen, Denoueix spent his whole playing career as a defender at Nantes before becoming a coach at the club's youth academy. During his time at the youth academy, he discovered players such as Didier Deschamps or Marcel Desailly. After Jean-Claude Suaudeau's retirement, he became the first team coach and won the Division 1 in the 2000–01 season. He was sacked the following season due to unsatisfying results in Ligue 1. In 2002, he was signed by the Real Sociedad and led the Spanish team to the second place in La Liga in the 2002–03 season.

== Honours ==
=== Player ===
Nantes

- Division 1: 1972–73, 1976–77
- Coupe de France: 1978–79

=== Manager ===
Nantes

- Division 1: 2000–01
- Coupe de France: 1998–99, 1999–2000
- Trophée des Champions: 1999, 2001

Individual

- Division 1 Manager of the Year: 2000–01
- Don Balón Award – La Liga Coach of the Year: 2002–03

=== Orders ===
- Knight of the National Order of Merit: 2004
