= Alex Di Rocco =

French footballer (born 1970)

Personal information
- Full name: Alexandre Di Rocco
- Date of birth: December 30, 1970 (age 55)
- Place of birth: Saint-Dié-des-Vosges, France
- Height: 1.90 m (6 ft 3 in)
- Position: Forward

Senior career*
Years	Team	Apps	(Gls)
1988–1990	Saint-Dié		
1990–1991	ASPV Strasbourg		
1991–1993	SR Saint-Dié		
1993–1995	SAS Épinal		
1995–1996	Amiens	9	(0)
1996–1997	Troyes	31	(5)
1997–2001	Sedan	86	(27)
2000–2001	→ Aberdeen (loan)	10	(3)
2001–2002	Saint-Étienne	34	(9)
2002–2003	Caen	38	(4)
2004	Saint-André-les-Vergers (am.)		
2004–2005	RCS La Chapelle		
- * Club domestic league appearances and goals

Alexandre Di Rocco, known as Alex Di Rocco (born December 30, 1970) is a French former professional footballer who played as a forward.
