= Pascal Delhommeau =

French footballer (born 1978)

Personal information
- Date of birth: 14 August 1978 (age 48)
- Place of birth: Nantes, France
- Height: 1.90 m (6 ft 3 in)
- Position: Defender

Youth career
- 1992–1998: Nantes

Senior career*
Years	Team	Apps	(Gls)
1998–2006	Nantes	121	(1)
2002	→ Lorient (loan)	13	(0)
2006–2008	Metz	51	(0)
2008–2011	Vannes	16	(2)
Total		201	(3)

International career
1997	France U18		
1998	France U21	4	(0)
- * Club domestic league appearances and goals

Pascal Delhommeau (born 14 August 1978) is a French former professional footballer who played as a defender.

== Career ==
Whilst at Nantes Delhommeau contributed nine appearances as his side won 2000–01 French Division 1. He also played as a substitute when Nantes won the 2001 Trophée des Champions. Whilst at Lorient he played as a substitute in the 2002 Coupe de France Final in which they beat Bastia.

Delhommeau won the 1997 UEFA European Under-18 Championship with France.
