= Antoine Sibierski =

French footballer (born 1974)

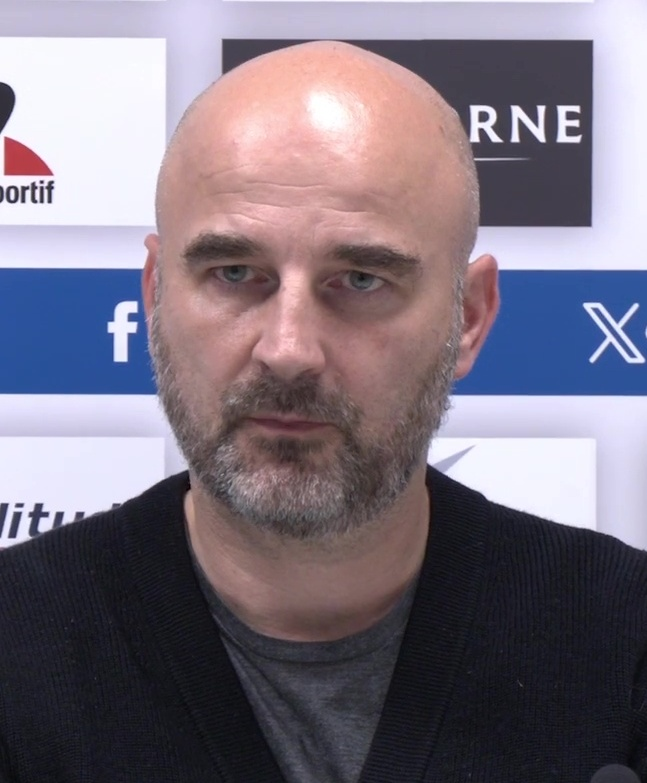
- Sibierski in 2024

Personal information
- Date of birth: 5 August 1974 (age 52)
- Place of birth: Lille, France
- Height: 1.87 m (6 ft 2 in)
- Position: Midfielder

Team information
- Current team: Anderlecht (sporting director)

Senior career*
Years	Team	Apps	(Gls)
1992–1996	Lille	97	(17)
1996–1998	Auxerre	41	(8)
1998–2000	Nantes	50	(17)
2000–2003	Lens	89	(23)
2003–2006	Manchester City	92	(11)
2006–2007	Newcastle United	26	(3)
2007–2009	Wigan Athletic	32	(4)
2008	→ Norwich City (loan)	15	(2)
Total		442	(85)

International career
1995	France U21	1	(0)
1996	France Olympic	3	(1)
- * Club domestic league appearances and goals

Antoine Sibierski (born 5 August 1974) is a French former professional footballer who played as a midfielder. He started his career at hometown club Lille, going on to play for Auxerre, Nantes, with whom he won the Coupe de France twice, and Lens. He then moved to England and played for Manchester City, Newcastle United, with whom he won the UEFA Intertoto Cup, Wigan Athletic, and Norwich City. At international level, he made three appearances for France at the 1996 Summer Olympics. He is currently the sporting director of Belgian Pro League club Anderlecht.

== Club career ==
=== Early career ===
Born in Lille, Sibierski began his career at his hometown club, where he moved up the ranks and played for four complete seasons in the first team, before playing for Auxerre and Nantes; he won the 2000 French Cup with the latter, in the final of which Sibierski scored both of Nantes' goals. He then joined Lens, and eventually became club captain during his three-year stay.

=== Manchester City ===
Sibierski moved to Manchester City for a fee of £700,000 in August 2003, where he scored on his debut against Charlton Athletic.

He was a regular substitute for the team, having started only eighteen of the thirty-three games he participated in, during an all-important first season in which he scored seven goals.

The 2005–06 season saw him fighting for a new contract at the club. Early on in the season, he won a place up front due to the injury of Andy Cole, but was soon reverted to the bench. Sibierski was subsequently released by the club that summer.

=== Newcastle United ===
Newcastle United signed Sibierski on 31 August 2006 on a one-year contract, just two hours and twenty minutes before the close of the transfer window.

He scored on his Newcastle debut in the UEFA cup first round tie against Levadia. His league debut for the club came at West Ham United on 17 September, and he scored his first domestic goal for Newcastle on 7 November against Watford in the League Cup. He scored his first league goal for the club in a 1–0 win over Portsmouth. Sibierski then went on to score his second league goal for the Magpies against Reading in a thrilling encounter in which the Magpies went on to win 3–2. His goal scoring form at the start of the season proved many doubters wrong, as Sibierski went on to be a key European figure. In Europe, Sibierski made seven appearances and scored four essential goals against Levadia Tallinn, Fenerbahçe, Celta Vigo and Zulte-Waregem respectively.

He quickly became a Newcastle favourite and an important member of the first team loved by the Newcastle faithful. Due to injuries on Tyneside, including England striker Michael Owen, Sibierski mainly played as a striker, where his partnership with Nigerian Obafemi Martins proved successful. He also played as an attacking midfielder in a 4–5–1 formation. He played a part in an exciting 2–2 draw with Manchester United, later saying he was disappointed not to get on the scoresheet against his former club's main rivals. He scored his first European goal of 2007 with a brilliant individual effort against Zulte-Waregem in the UEFA Cup on 15 February. Sibierski nut-megged a defender, took it round another, took it round the keeper and tapped home the last goal in a 3–1 win.

However, Newcastle were not willing to match Sibierski's wish of a new two-year contract at the club, instead offering just another one-year contract, which he rejected. Sibierski's agent Willie McKay stated that whilst negotiations were still ongoing, it looked increasingly likely that Sibierski would be leaving the club as his contract came to an end, especially with newly appointed manager Sam Allardyce bringing fresh ideas and tactics. Following his season with Newcastle, Sibierski described himself as a Newcastle fan. He is affectionately known among Newcastle United fans as 'Sib The Sexist' in homage to Tyneside's Silver Tongued Cavalier 'Sid The Sexist'.

=== Wigan Athletic ===
Sibierski agreed a two-year deal with Wigan Athletic on a free transfer from Newcastle United on 4 June 2007 along with Titus Bramble, who played at Newcastle with Sibierski the previous season but was also released. He scored on his debut in the 2–1 defeat at Everton on 11 August 2007. He followed this up with a second goal for the Latics on his home debut at the JJB Stadium on 15 August against Middlesbrough, and a third for Wigan's third game in a row, completing a 3–0 victory over Sunderland on 18 August. Subsequently, Sibierski suffered several injuries and his form slumped, as Wigan slipped from the top four down to the relegation zone.

However, on 12 January 2008, Sibierski scored a crucial winner within seconds of coming off the bench against Derby County with a low drive into the bottom left corner of the net from 25 yards out. He then followed this up with another spectacular goal against Chelsea, in the FA Cup.

On 1 September 2008, Sibierski joined Norwich City on loan. He scored what proved to be the winning goal on his debut against Plymouth Argyle on 13 September 2008 from a free-kick. However, after this he made little impact and returned to Wigan in January when his loan ended. He was released by Wigan at the end of the 2008–09 season, after not being offered a new contract.

== International career ==
Sibierski is of Polish descent through his paternal grandfather, who came to France from Poland to work in the mines. He represented France at the 1996 Summer Olympics, making three appearances.

== Post-playing career ==
After finishing his playing career, Sibierski briefly became a football agent with his brother. From 2024 to 2026, he served as the sporting director of Troyes. On 4 May 2026, he was appointed sporting director of Belgian club Anderlecht.

== Personal life ==
Former Lille teammate Frédéric Dindeleux, who had been his friend since the age of eight, was best man at Sibierski's wedding to Isabelle. The couple had three children together: two daughters, Axelle born in 2000 and Alessandro born in 2006 . Following the death of his 18-year-old elder daughter Sibylle on 1 February 2010, a charity "Fonds de Dotation Sibylle Sibierski" was formed in her name.

== Career statistics ==
Appearances and goals by club, season and competition
Club	Season	League			Cup (Note: Includes Coupe de France, Coupe de la Ligue, FA Cup and EFL Cup)		Continental		Total	
Club	Season	Division	Apps	Goals	Apps	Goals	Apps	Goals	Apps	Goals
Lille	1992–93	Division 1	6	0	—		—		6	0
Lille	1993–94	Division 1	22	1	1	0	—		23	1
Lille	1994–95	Division 1	36	7	2	0	—		38	7
Lille	1995–96	Division 1	33	9	4	1	—		37	10
Lille	Total		97	17	7	1	0	0	104	18
Auxerre	1996–97	Division 1	29	7	3	1	7 (Note: Appearances in UEFA Champions League)	0	39	8
Auxerre	1997–98	Division 1	12	1	0	0	10 (Note: Three appearances and one goal in UEFA Cup, seven appearances and one goal in UEFA Intertoto Cup)	2	22	3
Auxerre	Total		41	8	3	1	17	2	61	11
Nantes	1998–99	Division 1	22	4	4	0	—		26	4
Nantes	1999–2000	Division 1	28	13	7	6	6 (Note: Appearance(s) in UEFA Cup)	4	41	23
Nantes	Total		50	17	11	6	6	4	67	27
Lens	2000–01	Ligue 1	27	5	3	1	2 (Note: Appearances in UEFA Intertoto Cup)	0	32	6
Lens	2001–02	Ligue 1	25	6	3	1	—		28	7
Lens	2002–03	Ligue 1	37	12	3	1	8 (Note: Six appearances in UEFA Champions League, two appearances in UEFA Cup)	0	48	13
Lens	Total		89	23	9	3	10	0	108	26
Manchester City	2003–04	Premier League	33	5	6	1	1	1	40	7
Manchester City	2004–05	Premier League	35	4	3	2	—		38	6
Manchester City	2005–06	Premier League	24	2	5	0	—		29	2
Manchester City	Total		92	11	14	3	1	1	107	15
Newcastle United	2006–07	Premier League	26	3	4	1	9	4	39	8
Wigan Athletic	2007–08	Premier League	30	4	2	1	—		32	5
Wigan Athletic	2008–09	Premier League	2	0	0	0	–		2	0
Wigan Athletic	Total		32	4	2	1	0	0	34	5
Norwich City	2008–09	Championship	15	2	1	0	—		16	2
Career total			442	85	51	16	43	11	536	112

== Honours ==
Nantes

- Coupe de France: 1998–99, 1999–2000
- Trophée des Champions: 1999

Newcastle United

- UEFA Intertoto Cup: 2006

Individual

- Wigan Athletic Goal of the Season: against Chelsea, 26 January 2008
