= Charles Devineau =

French footballer and manager (born 1979)

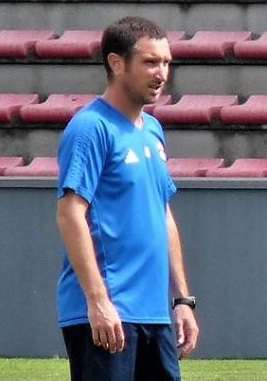
- Devineau in 2017

Personal information
- Full name: Jean Charles Devineau
- Date of birth: 2 August 1979 (age 47)
- Place of birth: Cholet, France
- Height: 1.71 m (5 ft 7 in)
- Position: Defensive midfielder

Team information
- Current team: AS La Châtaigneraie (Manager)

Youth career
- 1994–1998: Nantes

Senior career*
Years	Team	Apps	(Gls)
1998–2002	Nantes	51	(6)
2000–2001	→ Laval (loan)	13	(1)
2002–2005	Laval	95	(9)
2005–2006	FC La Châtaigneraie	15	(0)
2006–2010	Cholet	36	(5)
2010–2011	La Roche VF	6	(1)

International career
2001	France U21	3	(0)

Managerial career
- 2011–2014: Cholet
- 2014–2017: Nantes (U19)
- 2017–2019: Lyon Féminin (assistant)
- 2019–2022: La Roche VF
- 2022–: AS La Châtaigneraie
- * Club domestic league appearances and goals

Jean Charles Devineau (born 2 August 1979) is a French football manager and former player who manages AS La Châtaigneraie.

== Playing gareer ==
Devineau played for Nantes, winning the Ligue 1 in 2001 and twice becoming runners-up in the Coupe de France in 1999 and 2000.

Devineau played three times for the France under-21 national team.

== Managerial career ==
In the summer of 2011, Cholet hired Devineau as head coach for the start of the 2011–2012 season.

== Honours ==
Nantes

- Ligue 1: 2001
- Coupe de France: 1999, 2000
- DH Atlantique: 2009
- Trophée des Champions: 1999
