= 2000–01 French Division 1 =

63rd season of French Division 1

Division 1
- Season: 2000–01
- Dates: 28 July 2000 – 19 May 2001
- Champions: Nantes (8th title)
- Relegated: Toulouse; St-Étienne; Strasbourg
- Matches: 306
- Goals: 764 (2.5 per match)
- Best player: Eric Carrière
- Top goalscorer: Sonny Anderson (22 goals)

The 2000–01 Ligue 1 season (then called Division 1) was the 63rd since its establishment. FC Nantes won the French Association Football League for the eighth time with 68 points.

== Participating teams ==
- Auxerre
- Bastia
- Bordeaux
- Guingamp
- Lens
- Lille
- Lyon
- Marseille
- Metz
- Monaco
- Nantes
- Paris Saint-Germain
- Rennes
- Saint-Étienne
- Sedan
- Strasbourg
- Toulouse
- Troyes
Location of teams in 2000–01 Ligue 1

== League table ==
Pos	Team	Pld	W	D	L	GF	GA	GD	Pts	Qualification or relegation
1	Nantes (C)	34	21	5	8	58	36	+22	68	Qualification to Champions League first group stage
2	Lyon	34	17	13	4	57	30	+27	64	Qualification to Champions League first group stage
3	Lille	34	16	11	7	43	27	+16	59	Qualification to Champions League third qualifying round
4	Bordeaux	34	15	12	7	48	33	+15	57	Qualification to UEFA Cup first round
5	Sedan	34	14	10	10	47	40	+7	52	Qualification to UEFA Cup first round
6	Rennes	34	15	5	14	46	37	+9	50	Qualification to Intertoto Cup third round
7	Troyes	34	11	13	10	45	47	−2	46	Qualification to Intertoto Cup second round
8	Bastia	34	13	6	15	45	41	+4	45	Qualification to Intertoto Cup second round
9	Paris Saint-Germain	34	12	8	14	44	45	−1	44	Qualification to Intertoto Cup second round
10	Guingamp	34	11	11	12	40	48	−8	44	
11	Monaco	34	12	7	15	53	50	+3	43	
12	Metz	34	11	9	14	35	44	−9	42	
13	Auxerre	34	11	8	15	31	41	−10	41	
14	Lens	34	9	13	12	37	39	−2	40	
15	Marseille	34	11	7	16	31	40	−9	40	
16	Toulouse (R)	34	9	10	15	34	49	−15	37	Administratively relegated to Championnat National (Note: Toulouse was administratively relegated to Championnat National by the DNCG due to financial difficulties.)
17	Saint-Étienne (R)	34	8	10	16	42	56	−14	34	Relegation to French Division 2
18	Strasbourg (R)	34	7	8	19	28	61	−33	29	UEFA Cup first round and relegation to French Division 2 (Note: Strasbourg was qualified for the 2001–02 UEFA Cup as winners of the 2000–01 Coupe de France.)

Source: Ligue 1
Rules for classification: 1) points; 2) goal difference; 3) number of goals scored.
(C) Champions; (R) Relegated
Notes:

Promoted from Ligue 2, who will play in the 2001–02 Division 1

- Sochaux: champions of Ligue 2
- Lorient: runners-up
- Montpellier: third place

=== Position by round ===
Team ╲ Round	1	2	3	4	5	6	7	8	9	10	11	12	13	14	15	16	17	18	19	20	21	22	23	24	25	26	27	28	29	30	31	32	33	34
Nantes	18	7	4	3	4	7	7	10	13	15	11	7	10	6	9	6	5	2	2	4	2	1	1	2	2	2	2	2	2	1	1	1	1	1
Lyon	8	10	11	14	12	13	9	5	9	8	5	6	8	4	5	8	7	7	7	5	7	5	5	4	3	5	5	4	3	3	2	2	2	2
Lille	13	3	1	5	2	3	8	7	4	4	7	3	2	5	6	3	2	3	5	3	4	2	2	1	1	1	1	1	1	2	3	4	4	3
Bordeaux	12	16	16	16	16	14	15	16	12	12	6	9	6	3	2	1	1	1	3	1	3	4	3	3	4	3	3	5	4	4	4	3	3	4
Sedan	4	6	8	7	10	6	4	6	7	7	4	5	3	1	1	2	3	4	1	2	1	3	4	6	5	4	4	3	5	5	5	5	5	5
Rennais	9	11	12	10	11	15	16	15	16	14	10	12	13	12	12	13	15	13	10	11	10	7	9	9	10	10	7	10	6	6	6	6	6	6
Troyes	16	15	15	12	14	10	5	8	6	6	8	10	7	10	7	9	10	11	9	10	9	10	8	8	7	8	6	6	7	7	7	7	7	7
Bastia	5	2	5	2	5	2	1	1	2	1	2	2	4	8	4	7	6	5	4	6	5	8	6	5	6	6	8	9	10	11	11	9	10	8
PSG	2	5	2	6	3	4	3	3	1	2	1	1	1	2	3	4	8	9	12	9	11	11	12	10	11	11	12	11	12	10	12	12	11	9
Guingamp	7	12	17	17	18	16	14	12	10	9	12	8	5	7	8	5	4	6	8	8	6	6	7	7	8	7	9	7	8	8	8	10	9	10
Monaco	10	17	9	8	8	12	13	9	5	5	3	4	9	11	13	10	11	12	11	12	13	15	14	14	12	12	11	12	11	12	9	8	8	11
Metz	11	13	13	11	13	11	6	4	8	11	13	13	11	14	15	15	14	16	16	16	16	16	16	16	16	15	16	14	15	15	14	13	14	12
Auxerre	14	8	6	9	6	9	11	14	15	13	15	15	14	13	14	14	12	10	13	13	14	12	13	12	9	9	10	8	9	9	10	11	12	13
Lens	3	1	3	1	1	1	2	2	3	3	9	11	12	9	10	11	9	8	6	7	8	9	10	11	13	13	13	13	13	13	13	14	13	14
Marseille	1	9	10	13	9	5	10	13	11	10	14	14	15	16	16	16	16	15	15	15	15	14	15	15	15	16	14	15	16	16	15	15	15	15
Etienne	6	4	7	4	7	8	12	11	14	16	16	16	16	15	11	12	13	14	14	14	12	13	11	13	14	14	15	16	14	14	16	16	16	16
Toulouse	15	14	14	15	15	17	17	17	18	18	18	18	18	18	18	18	18	18	18	17	17	17	17	17	17	17	17	17	17	18	17	17	17	17
Strasbourg	17	18	18	18	17	18	18	18	17	17	17	17	17	17	17	17	17	17	17	18	18	18	18	18	18	18	18	18	18	17	18	18	18	18

Champions of 2000-01 Division 1
Qualified for UEFA Champions League
Qualified for UEFA Cup
Relegation to Ligue 2

First match(es) will be played on ?. Source:

== Results ==
Home \ Away	AUX	BAS	BOR	GUI	RCL	LIL	OL	OM	MET	ASM	NAN	PSG	REN	STE	SED	STR	TFC	TRO
Auxerre		1–0	0–2	1–1	3–2	1–1	0–3	0–1	1–0	1–0	2–2	1–0	0–1	4–3	0–1	1–2	2–0	2–2
Bastia	3–1		2–0	2–0	1–3	1–0	2–0	3–0	1–0	0–2	3–1	1–1	0–2	0–0	0–1	3–1	5–1	2–2
Bordeaux	1–0	0–0		0–2	1–1	1–0	1–1	3–0	1–1	2–1	0–2	2–0	3–0	2–1	2–2	2–1	2–1	2–2
Guingamp	1–0	1–0	1–1		0–1	0–1	2–3	1–0	1–3	2–2	0–1	1–1	1–6	2–2	0–3	2–1	2–1	1–1
Lens	1–0	4–0	2–2	3–2		0–1	0–0	1–0	1–1	4–3	1–4	1–1	1–2	0–0	1–1	0–0	2–1	1–1
Lille	1–1	1–0	2–2	1–1	2–1		1–2	1–0	2–1	1–1	1–1	2–0	1–0	4–1	2–0	1–1	1–0	1–2
Lyon	2–2	1–0	2–1	0–1	3–0	0–1		1–1	0–0	2–1	3–1	2–0	2–2	2–1	2–2	5–0	4–1	1–0
Marseille	0–1	2–1	0–1	3–1	0–0	0–1	1–1		4–1	2–1	2–0	1–0	0–1	2–1	2–1	0–0	1–1	3–1
Metz	1–2	3–2	2–0	1–1	2–1	1–1	0–0	1–0		1–3	1–2	1–0	0–2 (Note: Following the false passports affair, victory was awarded for Rennes 2–0 (2–2 on the pitch). Final result since 28 June 2001 (confirmed by the FFF and not contested by FC Metz before administrative justice).)	3–0	1–0	1–0	1–1	2–2
Monaco	1–1	2–1	2–2	1–0	0–0	1–2	0–2	0–2	6–1		2–5	2–0	1–2	5–3	1–0	1–0	3–0	4–3
Nantes	1–1	1–0	0–5	2–1	0–2	0–0	0–1	3–2	2–0	3–1		1–0	1–0	1–0	4–1	1–0	3–2	4–0
Paris SG	3–0	3–1	1–2	1–3	1–0	2–2	1–1	2–0	1–0	1–1	2–1		0–1	5–1	2–1	3–1	3–0	0–0
Rennes	0–1	1–2	1–2	1–2	1–0	2–0	3–4	2–0	0–1	1–1	0–2	1–1		3–0	2–0	3–0	1–1	0–2
Saint-Étienne	2–0	2–1	1–0	2–2	1–1	1–1	2–2	3–0	2–0	1–0	0–2	1–0	0–2		0–2	3–3	0–0 (Note: Following the false passports affair, the result of the ASSE-TFC match (1–0 on the field) was given the winner for Toulouse on the green carpet with a score of 0–0 by the Council of State on 25 June 2001. However, the LFP website does not seem up to date on this point.)	4–1
Sedan	1–0	3–3	0–0	2–2	2–2	1–0	1–1	2–0	0–0	1–0	2–0	5–1	2–1	2–1		1–0	2–3	2–1
Strasbourg	1–0 (Note: Match played in Caen.)	1–4	0–2	0–1	1–0	0–4	0–3	1–1	0–1	1–3	0–5	1–2	1–1	3–2	3–2		1–0	3–3
Toulouse	0–1	0–1	1–1	1–1	1–0	0–2	1–1	2–0	2–1	2–1	1–1	2–3	2–0	1–1	2–0	0–0		2–1
Troyes	1–0	0–0	1–0	0–1	1–0	2–1	1–0	1–1	3–2	1–0	0–1	5–3	3–1	0–0	1–1	0–1	1–1	

Source: Ligue 1
Legend: Blue = home team win; Yellow = draw; Red = away team win.

== Top goalscorers ==
Rank	Player	Club	Goals
1	(Brazil) Sonny Anderson	Lyon	22
2	(Portugal) Pauleta	Bordeaux	20
3	(France) Frédéric Née	Bastia	16
4	(Colombia) Victor Bonilla	Toulouse	15
5	(France) Gérald Baticle	Metz	14
5	(France) Laurent Robert	Paris Saint-Germain	14
7	(Brazil) Alex Dias	Saint-Étienne	13
8	(France) Bruno Rodriguez	Guingamp	12
8	(France) Steve Marlet	Lyon	12
8	(Democratic Republic of the Congo) Shabani Nonda	Monaco	12
8	(France) Olivier Monterrubio	Nantes	12
8	(Federal Republic of Yugoslavia) Slađan Đukić	Troyes	12

== Awards ==
=== Individual awards ===
Award	Winner	Club
Ligue 1 Player of the Year	(France) Éric Carrière	Nantes
Ligue 1 Young Player of the Year	(France) Sidney Govou	Lyon
Ligue 1 Manager of the Year	(France) Raynald Denoueix	Nantes

Team of the Year
Goalkeeper	(France) Lionel Letizi (Paris Saint-Germain)			
Defenders	(France) François Grenet (Bordeaux)	(France) Pascal Cygan (Lille)	(Brazil) Edmílson (Lyon)	(France) Jérôme Bonnissel (Bordeaux)
Midfielders	(France) Mathieu Berson (Nantes)	(France) Philippe Violeau (Lyon)	(France) Éric Carrière (Nantes)	(France) Olivier Quint (Sedan)
Forwards	(Brazil) Sonny Anderson (Lyon)	(Portugal) Pauleta (Bordeaux)		

== Attendances ==
#	Football club	Home games	Average attendance
1	Olympique de Marseille	17	50,755
2	Paris Saint-Germain	17	42,717
3	RC Lens	17	39,520
4	Olympique Lyonnais	17	34,565
5	FC Nantes	17	31,913
6	Girondins de Bordeaux	17	29,372
7	AS Saint-Étienne	17	26,487
8	Toulouse FC	17	19,926
9	Stade Rennais	17	19,454
10	FC Metz	17	18,389
11	Lille OSC	17	16,793
12	ESTAC	17	15,040
13	CS Sedan	17	14,267
14	RC Strasbourg	17	13,842
15	EA Guingamp	17	13,056
16	AJ Auxerroise	17	10,513
17	AS Monaco	17	8,897
18	SC Bastia	17	7,358
