= Calais RUFC =

Defunct football club in Calais, France

CRUFC
- Full name: Calais Racing Union Football Club
- Nicknames: Les Sangs et Ors (The Blood(-Reds) and Golds); Les Canaris (The Canaries)
- Founded: 1974
- Dissolved: 2017
- Ground: Stade de l'Épopée
- Capacity: 12,432
Home colours	Away colours

Calais Racing Union FC (Calais RUFC) was a French football club based in Calais, France.

Calais RUFC was founded in 1974 after a merger of two local clubs and, as an amateur club, reached the 2000 Coupe de France Final which it lost to top-flight Nantes. The club played at the 12,342-seater Stade de l'Épopée. Calais Racing Union was liquidated in September 2017.

== History ==
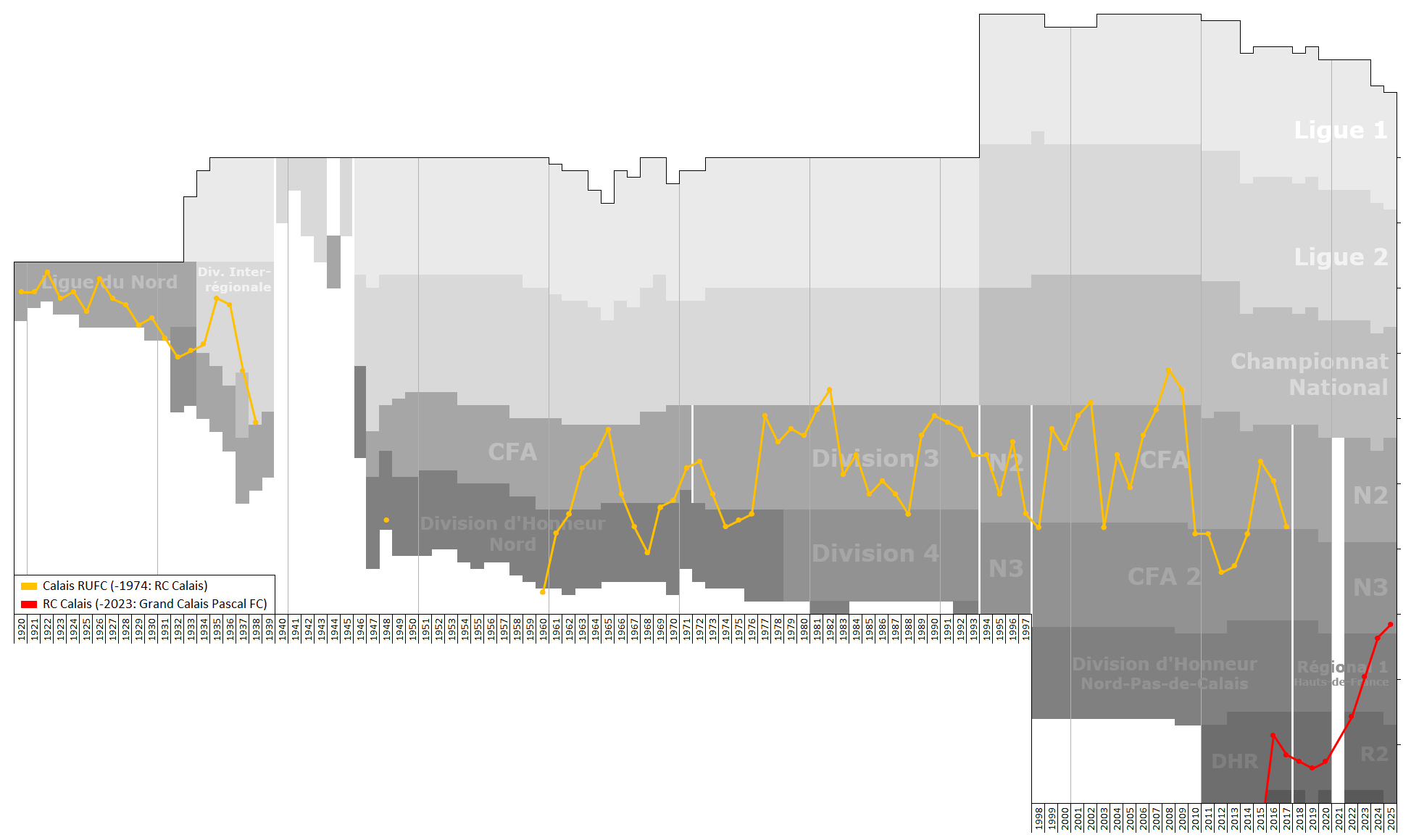
Historical league performance chart of Calais football clubs

=== Foundations ===
==== Racing Club de Calais ====
The club was founded in 1902 as Racing Club de Calais. RC Calais had excellent results in the first editions of the Coupe de France, taking part in the quarter-finals of the competition in 1921, the last 8 in 1922 and the last 16 in 1923, 1924, 1925, 1926 and 1930. In 1921 Calais even beat CASG Paris in the second round 3–2. The club joined the professional ranks in 1933. Lack of sufficient financial resources, Calais opted to give up its professional status in 1938, which remain the only 5 years of professional football in Calais. RC Calais remained in the amateur divisions, rejoining the CFA in 1962 but the following years were spent oscillating between the CFA and Division d'Honneur.

==== Union Sportive ====
Union Sportive was founded after the war in 1947, after a merger of two local clubs. Its main successes were reaching the last 32 of Coupe de France and notable appearances in Coupe Gambardella.

=== Merger ===
Racing Club was merged with Union Sportive in 1974, renamed as Calais Racing Union Football Club to reflect the names of the 2 clubs, and was given both the clubs' colours. Before the merger derby matches between the two attracted up to 5000 fans.

=== 1999–2000 Coupe de France ===
Calais RUFC entered the international spotlight during their run to the final of the 1999–2000 Coupe de France, under Spanish coach Ladislas Lozano. Made up of teachers, dock workers and office clerks, Calais' ten-round cup run saw the team defeat regional heavyweights Lille and first division teams Racing Strasbourg and Bordeaux; they played no games at their own ground, drawn as the away team in most rounds and the later 'home' ties played at the Stade Félix-Bollaert in Lens due to issues with facilities and capacity.

They eventually lost 2–1 to Nantes Atlantique in the final at the Stade de France in Paris on 7 May 2000, despite leading 1–0 at half-time.

=== Recent history ===
There was another creditable run in the 2005–06 Coupe de France, as Calais progressed through eight rounds, including a win over top-division Troyes, before losing narrowly in the quarter-finals, again to Nantes.

The club played their first match in their new Stade de l'Épopée on 27 September 2008, losing 4–1 to Laval in a Championnat National (third tier) match. Calais were relegated from the Championnat National at the end of the 2008–09 season, which would have resulted in them playing in the CFA, but on 14 July 2009, it was announced by the DNCG that Calais RUFC had been relegated to the CFA 2 due to administrative reasons. On 17 April 2010, the club broke the attendance record for a CFA 2 game, which had previously stood at 3,078. The game against Wasquehal had an attendance of around 4,000.

On 15 May 2010, CRUFC won the CFA 2 Group A by defeating Gravelines 2–0, with Alexandre Danset scoring both of the goals. They therefore qualified to compete in the CFA for the 2010–11 season. However, on 3 June 2010, the club were placed into liquidation by the Boulogne central court, and the FFF subsequently denied the club promotion. They again won their group in the 2010−11 CFA 2 season, and were again denied promotion by the FFF. They remained in CFA 2 until the 2013–14 season, when they were promoted to CFA as one of the best runners up.

In the 2016–17 season they finished bottom of CFA group B and were relegated, having had seven points deducted for various reasons during the season. Subsequently, the FFF gave them an Administrative relegation, meaning they would play the 2017–18 season at Regional level at best.

Calais RUFC eventually dissolved in September 2017.

== Honours ==
- Coupe de France
  - Runners-up: 1999–00
- CFA Group A
  - Champions: 2006–07
- Division Three (North)
  - Champions: 1980–81
- CFA 2 Group A
  - Champions: 1987–88, 1997–98, 2002–03, 2009–10
- CFA 2 Group B
  - Champions: 2010–11
- DH North
  - Champions: 1975–76
- DH North pas de Calais
  - Champions: 1990–91

== Former coaches ==
- Albert Dubreucq (1962–1965)
- (Bulgaria) Dimitri Antonov (1965–1966)
- R. Noël (1966–1967)
- Jean (1967–1968)
- Claude Plancque (1968–1973)
- Bernard Placzek (1973–1979
- Eugène Grévin (1979–1980)
- Jacques Fardoux (1980–1982)
- (Algeria) Mohamed Lekkak (1982–1983)
- Bernard Ledru (1983–1985)
- (Argentina) Gabriel Desmenez (1985–1987)
- (Italy) Richard Ellena (1987–1991)
- Jean-Marc Varnier (1991–1993)
- Jean-Claude Cloët (1993–1994)
- (Switzerland) Daniel Fuchs (1994–1995)
- (Spain) Ladislas Lozano (1995–2001)
- (Portugal) Manuel Abreu Freitas (2001–2002)
- Sylvain Jore (2002)
- Jean-Jacques Allais (2002)
- Sylvain Jore (2002–2003)
- Jean-Jacques Allais (2003)
- Sylvain Jore (2003–2007)
