= 1998–99 Coupe de France =

Tournament details
- Country: France
- Teams: 5,957

Final positions
- Champions: Nantes
- Runners-up: Sedan

Tournament statistics
- Top goal scorer(s): Dagui Bakari; Olivier Quint (5 goals)

The Coupe de France 1998–99 was its 82nd edition. It was won by FC Nantes Atlantique which defeated CS Sedan Ardennes in the Final.

== Round of 64 ==
| Team 1 | Score | Team 2 |
|---|---|---|
| Marseille (D1) | 2–0 | Auxerre (D1) |
| Metz (D1) | 1–0 | Bordeaux (D1) |
| Niort (D2) | 0–0 (a.e.t.) (2–3 p) | Strasbourg (D1) |
| Sochaux (D1) | 3–1 | Beauvais (D2) |
| Troyes (D2) | 2–1 | Montpellier (D1) |
| Amiens (D2) | 1–1 (a.e.t.) (5–4 p) | Monaco (D1) |
| Laval (D2) | 1–0 | Nancy (D1) |
| Châteauroux (D2) | 1–0 | Lyon (D1) |
| Thouars (Nat.) | 1–2 (a.e.t.) | Paris Saint-Germain (D1) |
| Paris FC (Nat.) | 1–0 | Lorient (D1) |
| Armentières (CFA) | 2–5 (a.e.t.) | Lens (D1) |
| La Roche (CFA) | 0–1 | Nantes (D1) |
| Dijon (CFA) | 2–1 | Bastia (D1) |
| Rennes (D1) | 4–0 | Coulaines (CFA2) |
| Jura Sud Foot (CFA2) | 1–1 (a.e.t.) (8–7 p) | Toulouse FC (D1) |
| Blagnac (CFA2) | 0–2 | Le Havre (D1) |
| Guingamp (D2) | 1–0 | Red Star (D2) |
| Istres (Nat.) | 1–3 | Nîmes (D2) |
| Gazélec Ajaccio (Nat.) | 1–1 (a.e.t.) (4–2 p) | Nice (D2) |
| Le Mans (D2) | 4–1 | Louhans-Cuiseaux (Nat.) |
| Valenciennes (Nat.) | 2–3 | Wasquehal (D2) |
| Chaumont (CFA2) | 0–3 | Sedan (D2) |
| Dives (DH) | 0–2 | Lille (D2) |
| Saint-Leu (CFA) | 1–0 | Angers (Nat.) |
| Saint-Georges (CFA2) | 1–1 (a.e.t.) (5–4 p) | Martigues (Nat.) |
| Éveil Mendois (DH) | 1–4 | Angoulême (Nat.) |
| Rodez (CFA) | 0–1 | Clermont (CFA) |
| Châtellerault (CFA) | 2–2 (a.e.t.) (6–5 p) | Fontenay (CFA) |
| Chasselay (DH) | 0–3 | Grenoble (CFA) |
| ASPV Strasbourg (DH) | 1–2 | Boulogne (CFA2) |
| Rouen (CFA2) | 1–0 | Sarrebourg (CFA2) |
| Mondeville (CFA2) | 0–0 (a.e.t.) (1–3 p) | Montagnarde (CFA2) |

== Round of 32 ==
| Team 1 | Score | Team 2 |
|---|---|---|
| Lens (D1) | 3–1 | Marseille (D1) |
| Paris Saint-Germain (D1) | 1–1 (a.e.t.) (4–5 p) | Nantes (D1) |
| Wasquehal (D2) | 0–2 | Metz (D1) |
| Le Mans (D2) | 2–0 | Rennes (D1) |
| Amiens (D2) | 1–0 | Le Havre (D1) |
| Guingamp (D2) | 2–1 (a.e.t.) | Strasbourg (D1) |
| Saint-Georges (CFA2) | 1–0 | Sochaux (D1) |
| Châteauroux (D2) | 1–2 | Laval (D2) |
| Gazélec Ajaccio (Nat.) | 1–1 (a.e.t.) (1–3 p) | Troyes (D2) |
| Dijon (CFA) | 0–4 | Sedan (D2) |
| Grenoble (CFA) | 2–3 (a.e.t.) | Nîmes (D2) |
| Boulogne (CFA) | 1–2 | Lille (D2) |
| Montagnarde (CFA2) | 4–0 | Paris FC (Nat.) |
| Angoulême (Nat.) | 1–0 | Châtellerault (CFA) |
| Rouen (CFA2) | 2–0 | Saint-Leu (CFA) |
| Clermont (CFA) | 4–1 | Jura Sud Foot (CFA2) |

== Round of 16 ==
| Team 1 | Score | Team 2 |
|---|---|---|
| Metz (D1) | 1–3 | Nantes (D1) |
| Lens (D1) | 1–1 (a.e.t.) (2–4 p) | Laval (D2) |
| Amiens (D2) | 1–2 | Sedan (D2) |
| Guingamp (D2) | 1–0 | Lille (D2) |
| Angoulême (Nat.) | 1–0 | Troyes (D2) |
| Clermont (CFA) | 0–2 | Le Mans (D2) |
| Saint-Georges (CFA2) | 0–2 | Nîmes (D2) |
| Montagnarde (CFA2) | 0–2 (a.e.t.) | Rouen (CFA2) |

== Quarter-finals ==
| 8 April 1999 | Le Mans (2) | 3–1 | Laval (2) | Le Mans |
| | Revillet 27'; Haddadou 64', 66' | | Chaouch 38' | Stadium: Stade Léon-Bollée; Attendance: 12,900; Referee: Stéphane Bré |

| 10 April 1999 | Nantes (1) | 2–0 | Guingamp (2) | Nantes |
| | Monterrubio 30'; Deroff 90' | | | Stadium: Stade de la Beaujoire; Attendance: 29,321; Referee: Alain Sars |

| 10 April 1999 | Angoulême (3) | 0–2 | Nîmes (2) | Angoulême |
| | | | Ecker 48'; Mendy 55' (pen.) | Stadium: Stade Camille-Lebon; Attendance: 6,000; Referee: Bruno Coué |

| 11 April 1999 | Rouen (5) | 0–2 | Sedan (2) | Le Petit-Quevilly |
| | | | Di Rocco 22'; Borbiconi 52' | Stadium: Stade Robert Diochon; Attendance: 7,200; Referee: Bruno Derrien |

== Semi-finals ==
| 27 April 1999 | Sedan (2) | 4–3 (a.e.t.) | Le Mans (2) | Sedan |
| | Di Rocco 76'; Quint 96'; N'Diefi 108', 118' | | Bakari 41' (pen.); Chagnaud 115'; Revillet 120' | Stadium: Stade Louis Dugauguez; Attendance: 13,580; Referee: Marc Batta |

| 28 April 1999 | Nantes (1) | 1–0 | Nîmes (2) | Nantes |
| | Savinaud 77' | | | Stadium: Stade de la Beaujoire; Attendance: 24,668; Referee: Gilles Veissière |

== Final ==
15 May 1999
20:45

| Nantes | 1–0 | Sedan |
|---|---|---|
| Monterrubio 58' (pen.) |

Stade de France, Saint-Denis
Attendance: 78,586
Referee: Pascal Garibian

== Topscorer ==
Dagui Bakari (5 goals)
Olivier Quint (5 goals)
