= 1999–2000 Coupe de France =

Tournament details
- Country: France
- Teams: 6,096

Final positions
- Champions: Nantes
- Runners-up: Calais

Tournament statistics
- Top goal scorer(s): Antoine Sibierski (6 goals)

The Coupe de France 1999–2000 was its 83rd edition. It was won by FC Nantes Atlantique, which defeated Calais RUFC in the final.

== Round of 64 ==
Team 1	Score	Team 2
Laval (D2)	0–0 (a.e.t.) (3–2 p)	Sedan (D1)
Sochaux (D2)	2–2 (a.e.t.) (2–4 p)	Le Havre (D1)
Amiens (D2)	1–0	Auxerre (D1)
Lorient (D2)	2–1	Montpellier (D1)
Rennes (D1)	2–0	Châteauroux (D2)
RC France (Nat.)	0–1	Monaco (D1)
Pacy VEF (Nat.)	0–2	Metz (D1)
Besançon (Nat.)	2–1	Lens (D1)
Thouars (Nat.)	1–0	Nancy (D1)
Grenoble (Nat.)	1–2 (a.e.t.)	Saint-Étienne (D1)
Vannes (CFA)	0–1	Troyes (D1)
Saint-Quentin (CFA)	1–0	Bastia (D1)
Limoges (CFA)	3–4	Paris Saint-Germain (D1)
Tours (CFA)	0–1 (a.e.t.)	Lyon (D1)
ES Segré (CFA)	0–1	Marseille (D1)
Marignane (CFA2)	0–1	Strasbourg (D1)
Schiltigheim (CFA2)	1–3	Bordeaux (D1)
Carcassonne (CFA2)	1–4	Nantes (D1)
Nîmes (D2)	2–0	Louhans (D2)
Gueugnon (D2)	1–0	Créteil (D2)
Calais (CFA)	1–1 (a.e.t.) (7–6 p)	Lille (D2)
La Roche (CFA)	1–1 (a.e.t.) (4–5 p)	Toulouse (D2)
Aurillac (CFA)	0–1	Cannes (D2)
Mondeville (CFA2)	0–2	Valence (D2)
Lyon Duchère (DH)	1–3	Niort (D2)
Baume-les-Dames (CFA2)	1–1 (a.e.t.) (5–4 p)	Évry (Nat.)
Levallois (CFA2)	0–1	Red Star (Nat.)
Pontivy (CFA)	1–0	Brest (CFA)
Porto Vecchio (CFA)	1–1 (a.e.t.) (4–3 p)	Vaulx-en-Velin (CFA2)
Langon-Castet (CFA2)	3–0	Montagnarde (CFA2)
Montceau (DH)	3–2	Vesoul (CFA2)
Les Herbiers (CFA2)	3–0	Compiègne (DH)

== Round of 32 ==
Team 1	Score	Team 2
Lyon (D1)	1–0	Troyes (D1)
Marseille (D1)	3–4	Gueugnon (D2)
Saint-Étienne (D1)	0–0 (a.e.t.) (3–4 p)	Lorient (D2)
Besançon (Nat.)	2–2 (a.e.t.) (2–4 p)	Strasbourg (D1)
Red Star (Nat.)	1–0	Le Havre (D1)
Thouars (Nat.)	1–2	Monaco (D1)
Porto Vecchio (CFA)	1–4	Bordeaux (D1)
Saint-Quentin (CFA)	1–3 (a.e.t.)	Metz (D1)
Baume-les-Dames (CFA2)	0–2	Paris Saint-Germain (D1)
Les Herbiers (CFA2)	0–4	Rennes (D1)
Montceau (DH)	0–6	Nantes (D1)
Amiens (D2)	1–1 (a.e.t.) (5–3 p)	Laval (D2)
Niort (D2)	0–3	Cannes (D2)
Nîmes (D2)	1–0	Toulouse (D2)
Pontivy (CFA)	2–1	Valence (D2)
Calais (CFA)	3–0	Langon-Castet (CFA2)

== Round of 16 ==
Team 1	Score	Team 2
Bordeaux (D1)	1–0	Metz (D1)
Strasbourg (D1)	1–0	Paris Saint-Germain (D1)
Rennes (D1)	3–2	Lorient (D2)
Nantes (D1)	0–0 (a.e.t.) (5–3 p)	Gueugnon (D2)
Red Star (Nat.)	1–2	Lyon (D1)
Pontivy (CFA)	0–4	Monaco (D1)
Nîmes (D2)	2–0	Amiens (D2)
Calais (CFA)	1–1 (a.e.t.) (4–1 p)	Cannes (D2)

== Quarter-finals ==
18 March 2000	Bordeaux (1)	1–0	Nîmes (2)	Bordeaux
	Laslandes 47'			Stadium: Parc Lescure; Attendance: 21,643; Referee: Bruno Coué

18 March 2000	Calais (4)	2–1	Strasbourg (1)	Lens
	Hogard 39'; Merlen 45'		Echouafni 6'	Stadium: Stade Félix-Bollaert; Attendance: 27,000; Referee: Jean-Claude Puyalt

19 March 2000	Lyon (1)	1–3	Monaco (1)	Lyon
	Laigle 35'		Pršo 59'; Simone 79'; Giuly 90'	Stadium: Stade de Gerland; Attendance: 24,788; Referee: Bruno Derrien

19 March 2000	Nantes (1)	2–1 (a.e.t.)	Rennes (1)	Nantes
	Fabbri 37'; Sibierski 118'		Le Roux 79'	Stadium: Stade de la Beaujoire; Attendance: 25,000; Referee: Laurent Duhamel

== Semi-finals ==
12 April 2000	Monaco (1)	0–1	Nantes (1)	Monaco
			Da Rocha 82'	Stadium: Stade Louis II; Attendance: 14,000; Referee: Eric Poulat

12 April 2000	Calais (4)	3–1 (a.e.t.)	Bordeaux (1)	Lens
	Jandau 99'; Milien 113'; Gérard 119'		Laslandes 108'	Stadium: Stade Félix-Bollaert; Attendance: 38,374; Referee: Pascal Garibian

== Final ==
7 May 2000
20:45

Nantes	2–1	Calais
Sibierski 50', 90' (pen.)		Dutitre 34'

Stade de France, Saint-Denis
Attendance: 78,717
Referee: Claude Colombo

== Topscorer ==
Antoine Sibierski (6 goals)
