= History of FC Nantes =

French football club from Nantes

The history of Football Club de Nantes, a French football club based in Nantes, began in April 1943 with the merger of several local clubs, including Saint-Pierre de Nantes, the city's main amateur club. FC Nantes achieved professional status in 1945 after being promoted to the national second division. The club had to wait about twenty years before reaching the French first division, driven by coach José Arribas. Under his leadership, the team won the French championship twice in a row, in 1965 and 1966, due to the offensive, collective, and attractive play of the "Canaries," which earned nationwide acclaim. Through its style of play, the stability of its team and management, and its youth academy, the FCN had a consistent success under coaches Jean Vincent, Jean-Claude Suaudeau (a disciple of Arribas), and Raynald Denoueix (a disciple of both).

Renowned for its distinctive playstyle, commonly referred to as jeu à la nantaise by journalists and fans, FC Nantes (known as FC Nantes Atlantique from 1992 to 2007) has established a notable legacy in French football. The club secured eight league titles between 1965 and 2001, complemented by three Coupe de France victories. Although less prominent in European competitions, with its best performances including the semifinals of the 1980 Cup Winners' Cup and the 1996 Champions League, FC Nantes has been widely recognized for the quality of its teams. These teams featured both collective cohesion and individual talent, with prominent players such as Henri Michel, Vahid Halilhodžić, and Jorge Burruchaga, alongside academy graduates like Didier Deschamps, Marcel Desailly, Christian Karembeu, and Claude Makelele.

== Creation and division 2 (1943–1960) ==
=== Creation during the occupation (1943–1944) ===
The circumstances surrounding the club's creation while Nantes was under German occupation remain unclear, with little information provided by either the municipality or the club itself. However, historical records indicate that leaders from various local clubs convened multiple meetings in central Nantes during the spring of 1943 (March 11, March 24, April 5, and April 21) in cafés in the city center—namely "Café Morice" on Place du Commerce and "Café des Alliés" on Rue de la Fosse—to establish a new club. The first team of Saint-Pierre de Nantes, the city's leading amateur club playing in the Division d'Honneur, gained autonomy under the new name, Football Club de Nantes. Two competing projects initially emerged: one led by Stade Nantais Université Club (SNUC), and the other by Marcel Saupin, a leader of La Mellinet. Saint-Pierre's participation in the latter project tipped the scales in its favor. The new club's board of directors included six members from Saint-Pierre, including its president, Marcel Braud. Other clubs in the city, particularly those associated with labor organizations, had only one representative each, such as Ateliers et Chantiers de la Basse-Loire, Association Sportive Ouvrière Nantaise, Société de Construction des Batignolles, and La Mellinet, while SNUC had two representatives. Additionally, two French Football Federation members were on the board.

Two key figures from the initial board of directors of FC Nantes stand out for their significant, albeit controversial, roles in the club's history. Saupin was known for his involvement in collaborationist activities, notably participating in the antisemitic Groupe Collaboration led by Alphonse de Châteaubriant. (Note: Information known since the opening of the Ministry of the Interior archives concerning certain collaborationist organizations, including the “Collaboration” group, by the decree of October 11, 1999 archive.) Second, Jean Le Guillou was not initially involved in Nantes' sports scene but became one of the club's first presidents. Le Guillou owned a construction company that built the Talensac Market and the Malakoff Stadium (now Stade Marcel-Saupin). He was also a prominent collaborationist in Nantes, who profited from the war by acquiring jewelry stores, fashion boutiques, and a stable of thoroughbred horses. His best-known racehorse, Ali Pacha, whose jockey wore yellow and green, inspired the club's colors. Le Guillou's construction company maintained close ties with the German occupiers, providing services to the Todt Organization, the Luftwaffe, and the Kriegsmarine, and collaborating with the Berlin-based construction firm Walter in a joint subsidiary called GWL. After the Liberation, Le Guillou was arrested on September 9, 1944, dismissed from his position, and succeeded by Saupin. He spent years in exile in Switzerland before returning to France under an amnesty in 1951.

The motivations behind the creation of FC Nantes remain unclear, though collaborationist ideology and its broader influence likely played a role. The club's founding principle, established on April 21, 1943, stated that FC Nantes aimed "to develop the physical and moral strength of young men through football and to foster friendship and solidarity among all members." While this mission aligns with typical objectives of a sports association, it must be viewed within the context of the Pétainist regime and Nazi propaganda, both of which emphasized sports as tools for ideological and social control. Contemporary press accounts described FC Nantes as bringing together "the best players from Nantes and Saint-Nazaire, naturally reinforced by several other high-caliber players," under the direction of experienced coach Aimé Nuic. For workers at the Chantiers and Batignolles shipyards, the prospect of sporting success was an appealing incentive. However, historian Louis Oury posits that the club's creation may have served a more covert purpose: retaining and influencing local youth at a time when many young men were fleeing to the maquis to escape mandatory labor under the Service du Travail Obligatoire (STO). Following the Liberation in 1944, FC Nantes underwent a transformation, with football becoming its primary focus. This marked the start of the club's journey toward its lasting place in French sports history.

=== First steps in division 2 (1944–1951) ===
In 1944, the battles for liberation prevented Nantes from capitalizing on its promotion to the second division, which it had earned by finishing second in the Division d'Honneur Ouest. Competitive play was heavily disrupted, and the few tournaments that took place were unofficial. Despite these challenges, Nantes secured an unofficial "treble" during the 1944–1945 season. The club triumphed in the Anjou amateur championship (part of the National II league) against teams such as SCO Angers, SO Cholet, and RC Ancenis. It also claimed the Western Championship, with a decisive 5–0 victory in the final against T¿Tour d'Auvergne from Rennes. Additionally, Nantes won the Western Cup, a friendly competition featuring the region's leading clubs, defeating SO Cholet 7–1 in the final. Although these achievements were not formally recognized, they underscored the club's resilience and growing prominence during a tumultuous period.

A few months later, FC Nantes joined the second division of the northern zone for the 1945–1946 season. Thus, FCN entered the professional era two years after its creation, with players largely from Saint-Pierre (Gergotich, Kerdraon, Crépin) and reinforced by some experienced players such as Antoine Raab or the Abautret brothers. The first official match played on August 26, 1945, saw the Nantes team beat CA Paris 2–0 away (goalscorers: Crépin, Ruffin), while the first-second division match at Malakoff ended in a 2–0 defeat to Troyes. In their inaugural season, Nantes finished 5th in their group.

In the 1946–1947 season, the second division championship returned to a single-group format, and coach Aimé Nuic was replaced at the start of the season by Raab, who took over as player-coach. For several seasons, the team finished in mid-table: 9th in 1947, 11th in 1948, and 9th again in 1949. Performances in the Coupe de France were not very impressive, with the team being eliminated quite early in the competition. However, the 1949–1950 season started disastrously, leading to Raab's replacement by Antoine Gorius, a team goalkeeper, who also assumed a player-coach role. At the end of the season, Nantes finished 17th and faced relegation but was ultimately saved. In 1951, following another disappointing season where the club finished 10th in the league, the municipal authorities provided a generous subsidy to the club, allowing them to recruit a prestigious coach, Émile Veinante.

=== A promotion slipping away (1951–1960) ===
The appointment of Émile Veinante as head coach signaled a strategic shift for FC Nantes. A former international with recent success in guiding FC Metz to Division 1 (D1), Veinante was brought in to accelerate Nantes' rise to the top tier. The 1951–1952 season began promisingly, with the team maintaining second place for much of the campaign. However, they faltered in the closing stages, ultimately finishing in 4th place. A defining moment of the season came during a decisive match against AS Monaco for the third-place playoff spot. In a heated and physically demanding contest, FC Nantes was reduced to ten men after Baumann sustained an injury. Leading 1-1 late in the game, Nantes conceded a controversial goal in the final ten minutes, despite an apparent offside. Adding to the frustration, a legitimate Nantes equalizer was disallowed for the same infraction. In protest, the Nantes players staged a sit-down strike on the pitch, ceasing play and ultimately suffering an 8–1 defeat. Despite the demoralizing result, club president Marcel Saupin commended the team for their efforts upon their return, reinforcing his support during a challenging season.

Émile Veinante was unable to achieve promotion for FC Nantes, with the team finishing 6th in 1953 and 9th in 1954. He resigned in the spring of 1955, shortly before the final match of the season, and was succeeded by Antoine Raab, who returned to the coaching role. Despite the presence of talented players such as the Dutch duo Gerrit Vreken and Jan van Geen—the latter becoming the club's first true star—and a growing fanbase, including a record attendance of 10,000 spectators for a 4–2 victory against Angers on November 9, 1953, the team's fortunes declined under Raab. Nantes finished 10th in 1955, and although their reserve team won the Western amateur championship, the senior squad struggled in the 1955–1956 season, hovering near relegation. Raab was dismissed with two matches remaining in the season. Under the temporary leadership of team captain Stanislas Staho, Nantes narrowly avoided relegation, finishing 17th and just above the relegation zone. This period marked a challenging chapter for the club as it grappled with inconsistent performances and organizational instability.

In 1956, FC Nantes appointed Louis Dupal, formerly of AS Monaco, with the aim of securing promotion to Ligue 1. To bolster the squad, the club brought in seasoned players such as Jean De Cecco, Roger Gabet, and Erich Habitzl (all joining in 1956), along with Guelso Zaetta, loaned from Angers in 1957, who would later become a significant figure at Nantes. Despite these efforts, the results fell short of expectations, with the club finishing 13th in both the 1956–1957 and 1957–1958 seasons. In December 1958, additional reinforcements arrived, including Raymond Wozniesko from Bordeaux and Ernest Bodini from Monaco. However, the 1958–1959 season ended with Nantes placing 14th. Amid mounting financial difficulties, the club underwent a major restructuring, resulting in Jean Clerfeuille becoming president. Dupal, unable to deliver the desired progress, was replaced at the start of the 1959–1960 season by Karel Michlowski, the former coach of Racing Club de Lens. Michlowski's tenure brought immediate improvements. The team was further strengthened by the arrivals of international players Daniel Carpentier and René Dereuddre. By autumn 1959, Nantes topped the league standings and set new attendance records at the Malakoff stadium, including a crowd of 15,912 on October 15 for a match against Nancy. However, the season was overshadowed by a scandal involving goalkeeper Lehel Somlay, on loan from Le Havre, who exposed an attempted bribery by Red Star officials during a 5–1 victory over them. This revelation led to Red Star's expulsion from the professional leagues. Despite the team's progress, Nantes narrowly missed promotion once again, finishing 8th. Frustrated by limited resources, Michlowski departed for Angers, prompting President Clerfeuille to seek new leadership and direction for the club.

== José Arribas: Promotion and first titles (1960–1976) ==
=== The climb to division 1 (1960–1963) ===
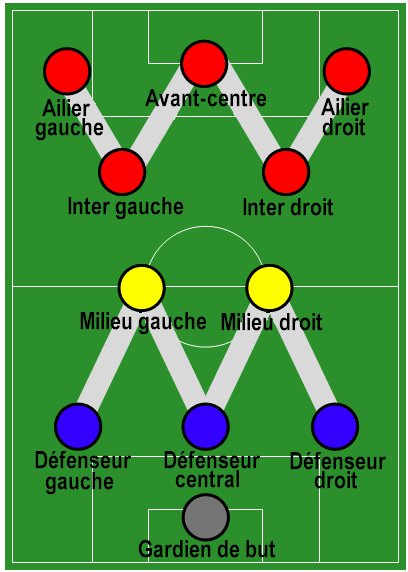
The WM.

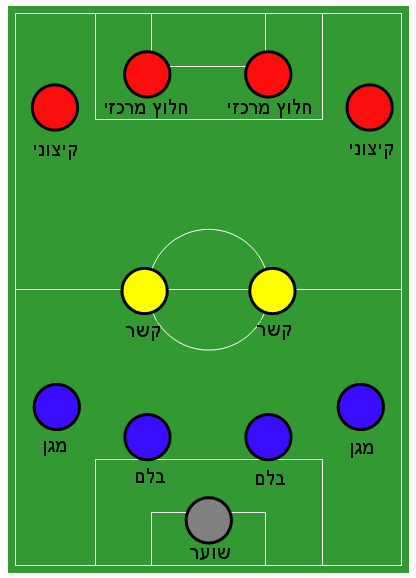
The 4–2–4.

The search for a new coach in 1960 presented a challenge for FC Nantes, as President Jean Clerfeuille encountered numerous candidates with questionable qualifications or excessive financial demands. However, one candidate stood out: José Arribas, a former player for US Le Mans and a Basque refugee from the Spanish Civil War. Arribas, who was coaching the amateur team of Noyen-sur-Sarthe at the time, impressed Clerfeuille with his modesty, focus on football, and passion for the joy of the game. Although Arribas was relatively unknown to Clerfeuille, two trusted sources provided glowing recommendations. Albert Heil, the reserve team coach at Nantes, had personal experience training with Arribas and spoke highly of him. Henri Guérin, coach of Rennes and a friend of Arribas, also endorsed him enthusiastically. On July 14, 1960, Clerfeuille met with Arribas. Their discussion lasted just ten minutes, culminating in the signing of a contract that would set the stage for a transformative era in FC Nantes' history.

José Arribas, modest in demeanor and always formal in his interactions—addressing his players with the polite "vous"—brought a revolutionary approach to FC Nantes. A natural pedagogue, he explained his strategies with clarity and precision, fostering a deeper understanding of the game among his players. As a self-taught coach and innovator, Arribas experimented with various tactical systems, giving Nantes a competitive edge. One of his earliest changes was implementing a zone defense, breaking away from the prevalent man-to-man marking of the era. After a devastating 10–2 loss to Boulogne, Arribas, who had earned the full trust of President Jean Clerfeuille, introduced another significant innovation: the adoption of the 4-2-4 formation. Inspired by the Brazilian tactics showcased in the 1958 World Cup, this system added a second central defender, reinforcing the backline to support overlaps by Gabriel Caullery and fullbacks Maurice Balloche and Daniel Carpentier. In addition to his tactical advancements, Arribas emphasized a style of play that prioritized short, quick passes, making the most of his team's technical skills rather than physicality. He also instilled a renewed sense of joy in the game, a quality that had been absent at Nantes, which resonated deeply with the players. This transformative approach led to noticeable improvement, with the club finishing a respectable 11th place in Division 2 during Arribas' first season in 1961.

Albert Heil played a pivotal role in the development of FC Nantes, not only advocating for José Arribas' arrival but also overseeing the development of numerous young talents who had been overlooked by other clubs. Heil was instrumental in recruiting future stars: Gilbert Le Chenadec in 1958, Philippe Gondet and Jean-Claude Suaudeau in 1960, Bernard Blanchet in 1962, and Robert Budzynski in 1963. In the immediate term, Arribas benefited from the presence of experienced players, including some big names nearing the end of their careers, such as René Dereuddre (1959–1961), and especially five key recruits in 1961: Pancho Gonzales in defense (1961–1963), Jean Guillot (1961–1965) and Pierre Grillet (1961–1962) from RC Paris, and forwards: André Strappe (1961–1963) and Thadée Cisowski (1961–1962). This strategy did not immediately bear fruit, as FC Nantes only finished 6th in 1961–1962. The 1962–1963 season began slowly, and it took pressure from several key players (Strappe, Gonzales, Guillot) on the club's management, with threats to leave, to prevent Arribas from being fired (despite requests from Antoine Raab, the technical advisor, to end the Basque coach's experiments). However, the results were not immediately promising, and Nantes finished 6th in the 1961–1962 season. The 1962–1963 campaign began slowly, and it took pressure from key players, including Strappe, Gonzales, and Guillot, who threatened to leave the club, to prevent Arribas from being dismissed. Despite calls from technical advisor Antoine Raab to end the Basque coach's experimental approach, and Guillot, who threatened to leave the club, to prevent Arribas from being dismissed. Despite calls from technical advisor Antoine Raab to end the Basque coach's experimental approach. However, the results were not immediately promising, and Nantes finished 6th in the 1961–1962 season. The 1962–1963 campaign began slowly, and it took pressure from key players, including Strappe, Gonzales, and Guillot, who threatened to leave the club, to prevent Arribas from being dismissed. Despite calls from technical advisor Antoine Raab to end the Basque coach's experimental approach. Nantes soon surged to the top of the standings, becoming autumn champions in December 1962. While Saint-Étienne ultimately overtook them, Nantes secured promotion on June 1, 1963, with a 3–1 victory against Sochaux (with two goals from Jean Guillot and one from Sadek Boukhalfa) in front of a record crowd of 16,959 spectators. Key contributors to this promotion included experienced players like Strappe, Gonzales, Guillot, Raymond Fiori, and Yves Jort, alongside the young talents Le Chenadec, Suaudeau, and Gondet, who were already indispensable. Mid-season recruit Rafael Santos also played a key role in replacing the ailing Gondet.

=== Conquering France (1963–1970) ===
The transition to France's top football tier proved successful for FC Nantes, despite several significant changes to the squad, including Pancho Gonzales' retirement and André Strappe's departure to Bastia. Moreover, young players skillfully identified by the club bolster the team beyond expectations. Notable additions include Jacky Simon, a young forward from Cherbourg, Robert Budzynski, a promising defender cast aside by RC Lens, and Gabriel De Michèle, an amateur left-back from Jarny, recommended by Aimé Nuic, his coach in Lorraine. On September 1, 1963, FC Nantes played their first match in Ligue 1 against Sedan. The game ended in a 2–2 draw, but Jacky Simon made history by scoring the opening goal in the 11th minute, becoming the first Nantes player to score in the top division. The 1963–1964 season was a strong one for Nantes, as they comfortably secured their survival in Ligue 1, finishing 8th in the league. The team also had a notable run in the Coupe de France, reaching the semi-finals, further solidifying their place among France's elite clubs.

José Arribas' efforts finally bore fruit in the 1964–1965 season when FC Nantes stunned the French football world by winning the championship. On May 30, 1965, over 20,000 fans gathered at the Malakoff Stadium (later renamed Stade Marcel-Saupin in honor of its founder, who died in January 1963) for the final day of the season. Facing AS Monaco, Nantes secured a 2–1 victory, with goals from their stars Jacky Simon (9th minute) and Ramon Muller (14th minute). Simon, who finished as the league's top scorer with 24 goals, was named the best season player by the press and became the first Nantes player to be called up to the French national team on May 24, 1965. Muller, the team's playmaker, captivated fans with his creativity, including a 30-meter volley that clinched the title. Nantes completed a perfect season with victories in the Coupe de la Ligue and the Challenge des Champions against Rennes (4–2). José Arribas was named the best coach of the first division.

The 1965–1966 season confirmed Nantes' dominance. The team finishes with the best attack (84 goals) and the best defense (36 goals). Philippe Gondet's return to form is a key factor, as he finishes as the league's top scorer with 36 goals in 37 matches. The solid defense, led by goalkeeper Daniel Eon and the central defensive pairing of Gilbert Le Chenadec and Robert Budzynski, also plays a crucial role. Other key players from the two titles include Sadek Boukhalfa (the left-winger who left for Bastia in 1965), Gabriel De Michèle (a left-back nicknamed Jaïr by Ramon Muller), Bernard Blanchet (a versatile winger, excellent in aerial duels and often decisive), Rafael Santos (always available to cover injuries), and Jean-Claude Suaudeau (a true link between defense and attack, often described as a perfect relay between the two). De Michèle, Gondet, and Budzynski all participated in the 1966 FIFA World Cup, but the French team was eliminated in the first round despite their efforts.

Despite a successful season, two notable disappointments marred FC Nantes' 1963–1964 campaign. The first was their defeat in the Coupe de France final against Racing Club de Strasbourg, losing 1–0. This result was particularly frustrating for Nantes, as they had to play most of the match with only ten players due to an injury to the indispensable Ramon Muller before halftime. The second disappointment came in their European Cup campaign, where they were eliminated in the first round by Partizan Belgrade, a team that would go on to reach the final that year. This setback was echoed in the 1966–1967 season when Nantes were again eliminated in the Round of 16, this time by Celtic Glasgow, who would ultimately win the competition that season.

The decline in FC Nantes' performance during the late 1960s can primarily be attributed to the departures of key players such as Boukhalfa, Guillot (1965), Muller, Santos, and Bako Touré (father of José Touré), which left the team weakened and aging. The club's recruitment efforts were insufficient, despite the arrival in 1966 of Yugoslav player Vladimir Kovacevic and two future key players, Michel Pech and Henri Michel. The team's defense, in particular, became vulnerable due to a series of setbacks: the prolonged absence of Daniel Eon, the transfer of Le Chenadec to Metz in 1967, Budzynski's tibia-fibula fracture in 1968 (which ended his career after two years of recovery), and the departure of Claude Robin in 1969. Substitutes also failed to meet expectations, notably Roger Lemerre, who, despite his talent, who struggled to adapt to Arribas' zonal defense system despite his talent. While Nantes finished second in 1967, their performance dropped to 7th place in 1968, followed by 10th-place finishes in 1969 and 1970. The 1969–70 season appeared to herald a revival, as FC Nantes reached the French Cup final. However, their hopes were crushed on May 31 at the Stade de Colombes, when they suffered a crushing 5–0 defeat at the hands of Saint-Étienne, the dominant force in French football at the time, in the final at Stade de Colombes.

=== From one cycle to another (1970–1976) ===
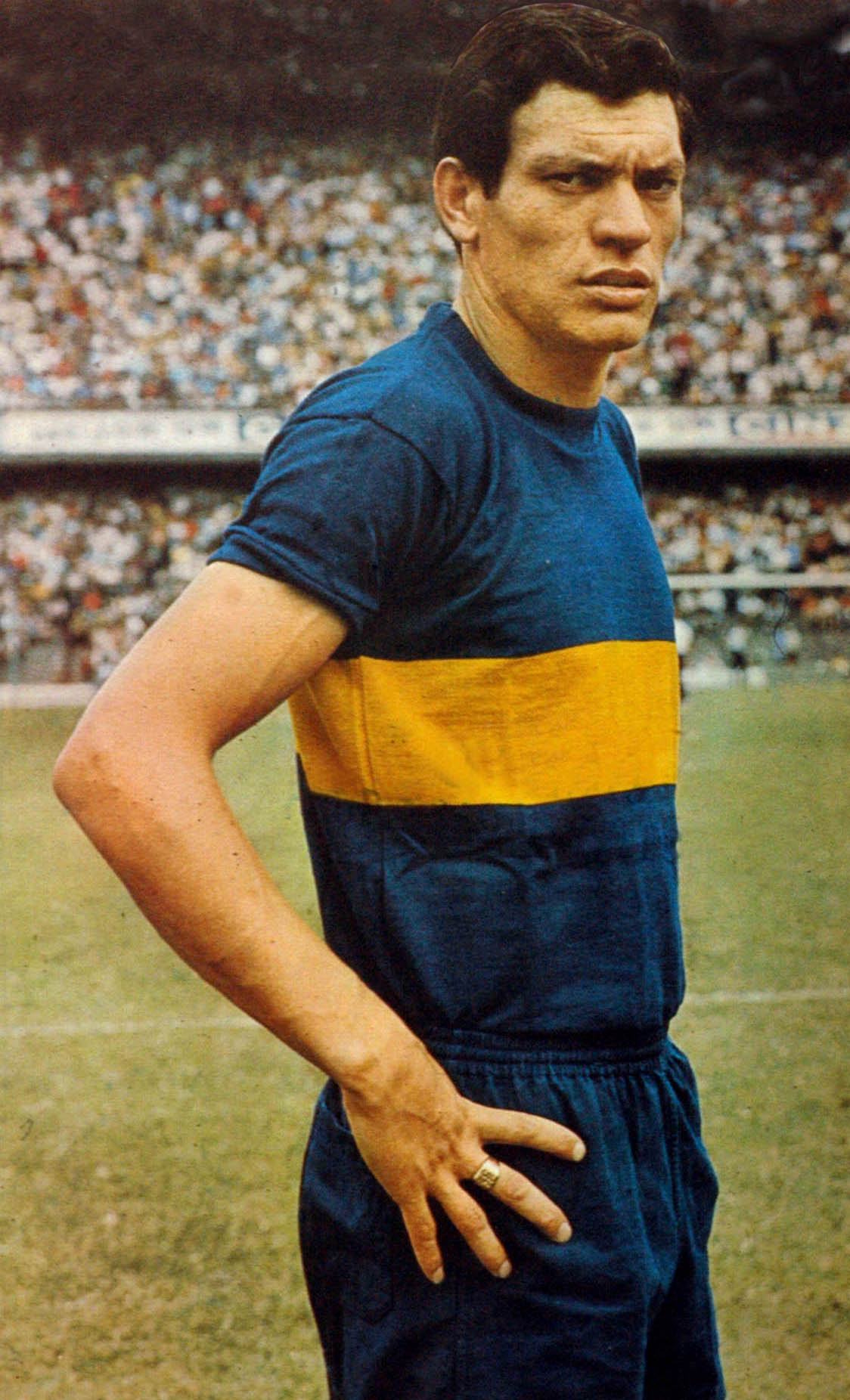
Hugo Curioni, 24 goals in one year (January 1974 - January 1975).

The 1970s began with the dominance of AS Saint-Étienne, led by Albert Batteux, and Olympique de Marseille, spearheaded by their prolific striker Josip Skoblar. Meanwhile, José Arribas focused on preparing the next generation for FC Nantes. His efforts began immediately after the 1970 Cup final defeat. Robert Budzynski, forced into retirement, was appointed as the club's sporting director—the first such role in French football. Jean-Claude Suaudeau also retired from professional play but continued his involvement as a player-coach for the reserve team in the third division, alongside Zaetta. Arribas tasked these two coaches with instilling the younger players with the tactical principles that had brought success to Nantes. Training young talent became a priority for Arribas, leading to the establishment of a modest youth academy in the city center.

Simultaneously, the club resumed recruiting promising young players: solid defenders like Patrice Rio and Bernard Gardon, goalkeeper Jean-Paul Bertrand-Demanes, who had already made appearances in the first team by 1969, and Gilles Rampillon, a 17-year-old forward who balanced training with preparing for entrance exams to Normale Sup at Lycée Clemenceau. Other recruits included René Donoyan, Omar Sahnoun, and Claude Arribas (José's son).

Tactically, FC Nantes transitioned to a 4-3-3 formation, increasingly common in European football. Arribas also shifted from a flat defensive line to a system with a stopper and a sweeper. The team finished 3rd in 1971 and 7th in 1972.

By the start of the 1972–73 season, only Bernard Blanchet and Gabriel De Michèle remained from the squad that had won the first two titles. The new team core included Henri Michel (captain since 1971), Michel Pech, Jean-Claude Osman, Gardon, Bertrand-Demanes, and Rampillon, who had established themselves as starters. Key additions like Didier Couécou, an experienced striker, and Erich Maas, a left winger from Bayern Munich, reinforced the squad. Argentine signings, Ángel Marcos and Ángel Hugo Bargas, also bolstered the team. Marcos, recruited in 1971, was brought in to fill the void left by Gondet, while Bargas, named Argentina's Athlete of the Year in 1972, joined mid-season after a series of administrative complications that even led to the resignation of the AFA president. With this strengthened lineup, FC Nantes reached the top of the league table in February and secured their third national title ahead of OGC Nice. However, they once again missed out on the double, losing to Olympique Lyonnais, led by Fleury Di Nallo, Serge Chiesa, and Bernard Lacombe, in the French Cup final at the Parc des Princes.

In the years following José Arribas' tenure, Saint-Étienne regained dominance in French football, while FC Nantes finished 2nd in 1974, 5th in 1975, and 4th in 1976, failing to progress beyond the quarterfinals in the French Cup during this period. Their performances in European competitions were similarly disappointing: they were eliminated in the Round of 16 by Cardiff City in the Cup Winners' Cup in 1971, by Tottenham in the UEFA Cup in 1972, by Vejle BK in the European Cup in 1974, and by Banik Ostrava in the UEFA Cup in 1975. In 1976, Nantes management offered José Arribas only a one-year contract extension, explaining their preference for year-by-year agreements with their coaches. A proponent of stability, Arribas chose to leave FC Nantes and signed with Marseille, where he was dismissed after a few matches. His 16 consecutive years at the club set a record for French football at the time, a record later surpassed by Guy Roux at AJ Auxerre. (Note: Guy Roux coached AJ Auxerre for twenty-six consecutive years between promotion to D2 and his first departure from the bench (1974–2000).)

== Consistency in success (1976–1988) ==
=== The Jean Vincent I era: The Young Wolves (1976–1979) ===
Jean-Claude Suaudeau, initially considered a potential successor to José Arribas, was ultimately deemed too young and too familiar with the players by the club's management. They preferred to hire a more experienced coach. Among several candidates, including Ferenc Puskás, the club directors ultimately chose Jean Vincent. The former striker for Lille OSC and Stade de Reims, with 45 international caps, was brought in with the goal of expanding Nantes' trophy collection, particularly in the Coupe de France and European competitions. The club's management was determined to avoid disappointments, early eliminations, and missed opportunities in finals.

Yet, it was in the league that Jean Vincent revived FC Nantes with a surprising approach. Upon his arrival, he sidelined Robert Gadocha and Yves Triantafilos, the team's two-star players, whom he deemed out of form, preferring to place his trust in a trio of strikers formed at the club and recently selected for the French Olympic team at the 1976 Montreal Olympics: Loïc Amisse, Bruno Baronchelli, and Éric Pécout. This trio, known as “the Olympic Attack,” marked the season. Continuing this strategy, Vincent also trusted other young players developed under Suaudeau's guidance, such as Thierry Tusseau, Omar Sahnoun, Georges Van Straelen, Gilles Rampillon, and Oscar Muller. This team of ambitious and talented youngsters started the season on fire, winning at Metz (1–2) on opening day and later defeating Sochaux (2–6). On October 15, the Canaries showed their resilience: after trailing 0–3 against PSG at Saupin, they came back to finish 3-3. Nantes led the league alongside Lyon and Bastia. After a spring loss at home to Lyon and Bastia, the young team clinched the league title. They also reached the semi-finals of the Coupe de France, but despite winning 3–0 in the first leg at Nantes, they were defeated 5–1 in extra time at Geoffroy-Guichard by Saint-Étienne.

Meanwhile, the club continued to strengthen its infrastructure. In 1978, the La Jonelière training center was opened, far from the city center, offering tranquility and space for a top-notch sports complex, including a groundbreaking training center in France.

During the 1977–1978 season, FC Nantes fielded an unchanged championship-winning team but was caught off guard, like all other contenders in the league, by AS Monaco, finishing in second place. In the European Cup, they were also taken by surprise. After overcoming Dukla Prague, Nantes was held to a 1–1 draw at home by Atlético Madrid. In the return leg at the Vicente Calderón Stadium, young Guy Lacombe, who had scored in the first match, gave Nantes the lead. However, the Madrilenians eventually secured a 2–1 victory. In the Coupe de France, Nantes was eliminated by Nice in the quarterfinals.

The 1978–1979 season was quite different. It started poorly as, despite the arrival of Victor Trossero in attack, Nantes's gameplay deteriorated and the team's offensive performance was disappointing. The Canaries were quickly eliminated from the UEFA Cup by Benfica Lisbon, and they fell behind Strasbourg by as many as nine points in the league. Jean-Claude Suaudeau was then promoted to "advisor" to Jean Vincent, who agreed to collaborate more closely with the disciple of Arribas. The collaboration paid off, and the team's play improved. However, it was too late in the league, and Nantes finished two points behind the Alsatians. But in the Coupe de France, the Canaries finally delivered what was expected of them. After a tough run (including a match against Marseille in the quarterfinals), Nantes made it to the final at the Parc des Princes. While a Nantes-Strasbourg final had been anticipated, the champion was surprised by Auxerre, a surprising second-division team led by a young coach, Guy Roux, who had won the media's favor. The Parisian crowd was entirely behind "David" and jeered at the Canaries throughout the match. Despite the hostile atmosphere, Nantes kept their cool, and though they were held to a draw at the end of regular time (1-1), they dominated in extra time, winning 4–1, largely thanks to Pécout's hat-trick, a unique feat in a cup final. (Note: Equalled since by Jean-Pierre Papin for Olympique de Marseille in the 1989 final (3-2).) Jean Vincent had fulfilled his mission, and Nantes had finally won the national trophy they had longed for.

=== Jean Vincent II era: close to European glory (1979–1982) ===
The 1979–1980 season marked a return to the top for Nantes in the league. Strengthened by the arrival of Argentine Enzo Trossero (unrelated to Victor), who replaced the departure of Sahnoun to Bordeaux, Nantes also benefited from tactical evolutions (Henri Michel moving to defense after Bargas's retirement), the confirmation of key players (Bossis, Tusseau, Baronchelli), and the emergence of new talents, notably forward José Touré, son of Bako Touré, and two full-backs, Michel Bibard and William Ayache. The title was secured with a three-point lead over Sochaux and Saint-Étienne, but the real surprise of the season came at the European level: Nantes finally made their mark on the continental stage in the Cup Winners' Cup. They eliminated Steaua Bucharest and Dynamo Moscow. In the semi-final, Nantes had a chance against Valencia CF, led by Alfredo Di Stéfano and featuring Mario Kempes and Rainer Bonhof. In the first leg at Saupin, Nantes's attacking display was not reflected in the score, as Kempes scored on his only opportunity (2–1). Nantes still held hopes for the return leg. However, as the team was about to board their flight to Valencia, they received the devastating news that their teammate Omar Sahnoun had died of a heart attack during training with Bordeaux. This tragic event deeply affected the morale and focus of the Nantes players, who were ultimately defeated 4–0 in Valencia. It is also worth noting that Nantes lacked an attacker of the caliber of Kempes, who scored twice in the return leg. While the defeat was disappointing, it should not overshadow the achievement of reaching the semi-finals—Nantes had firmly established themselves as a force in European football. An amusing side note from the summer of 1980: while in town for a concert, Bob Marley and the Wailers played a small five-a-side match at La Jonelière against a few Nantes players.

The following season proved less glorious for Nantes. Pécout was sidelined for a long time due to injury, Victor Trossero left, and the only significant reinforcement was Fabrice Poullain, a product of the youth academy. Nantes relied on their qualities and style of play, but in the UEFA Cup, it wasn't enough to overcome Inter Milan, who eliminated the Canaries in the Round of 16 (1–2 at Nantes, 1–1 at San Siro). Then, in the Coupe de France, Bordeaux ended Nantes's journey (1–4 at Nantes, 4–6 at Bordeaux). Saupin was no longer an impregnable fortress. Nantes had been undefeated at home in the league since April 15, 1976 (a loss to PSG), with an unmatched streak of 92 matches without defeat (80 wins and 11 draws, scoring 237 goals while conceding only 52). However, they were finally beaten by Auxerre and a goal from Patrick Remy. Held to a draw at home by Saint-Étienne (1-1), Nantes lost the title to the Greens. Jean Vincent's leadership came under increasing criticism, and the team, nicknamed "the Inter of Nantes," struggled. Yet, in the summer of 1981, Nantes managed to recruit an exceptional player in the form of Yugoslav forward Vahid Halilhodžić, one of Europe's best strikers. However, his adaptation was difficult. He admitted that it took him a while to adjust to the dynamic style of play at Nantes. Quickly out of form in the league, eliminated by Lokeren in the Round of 32 of the UEFA Cup, and by Nœux-les-Mines in the Round of 32 of the Coupe de France, Nantes's season was in turmoil. Jean Vincent became increasingly unwanted, and before the end of the season, he left the club to become the coach of Cameroon for the 1982 FIFA World Cup. Jean-Claude Suaudeau naturally took over to finish the season, with Nantes ending in sixth place. Bossis was the only player from Nantes to participate in the World Cup with French national team. Heading into the 1982–1983 season, many questions remained about Nantes's future.

=== Jean-Claude Suaudeau, the Heir (1982–1988) ===
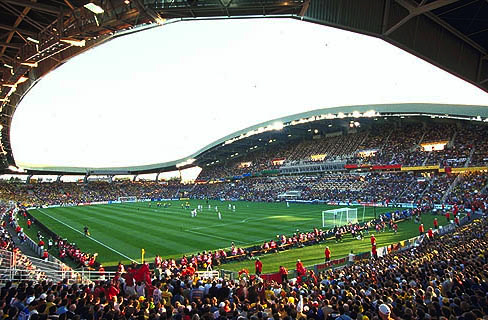
In 1984, FC Nantes moved into the brand-new, architecturally audacious Beaujoire stadium.

The managerial change marked the end of an era for FC Nantes. Henri Michel retired that summer, and Gilles Rampillon moved to AS Cannes, meaning the two key leaders of Jean Vincent's squad also departed. Despite these significant losses, Nantes experienced immediate success under the guidance of Jean-Claude "Coco" Suaudeau, with the team maturing into what is often considered the best in the club's history—a sentiment Suaudeau himself shared. No external reinforcements were made, yet the team thrived.Vahid Halilhodžić found his rhythm, while Loïc Amisse and Bruno Baronchelli shone brightly on the wings. José Touré became a key asset in a supporting striker role so brilliant that he earned the nickname Le Brésilien. (Note: This nickname was given to him during the season, even before his “Brazilian” goal in the cup final.) In midfield, the tireless Oscar Muller benefited from the addition of Seth Adonkor, a physically exceptional player who foreshadowed the defensive midfielder role that would become common in 1990s football. In goal, the ever-present Jean-Paul Bertrand-Demanes held the fort, while the defense found its balance with Maxime Bossis, repositioned as sweeper and promoted to captain, alongside the indomitable Patrice Rio, with Thierry Tusseau on the left and William Ayache on the right. The substitutes, though few, also played an important role, including Michel Bibard and Fabrice Poullain. Nantes finished as French champions, outclassing teams like Bordeaux and PSG, with impressive stats: 58 points, (Note: 24 wins, 10 draws, 4 losses (2-point win).) the best attack (77 goals scored), the best defense (29 goals conceded), and 27 goals from Halilhodžić, the top scorer in Ligue 1. Yet again, Nantes missed the double. In the match against PSG, despite playing away at Parc des Princes, the Canaries dominated the first half, leading 2–1 at halftime thanks to Baronchelli and a stunning goal by José Touré. (Note: The goal is often described as the finest ever scored in a French Cup final, and one of the finest in the history of French soccer.) However, they failed to capitalize on numerous chances in the second half. Paris was revived by Safet Sušić, before Nabatingue Toko sealed Nantes's fate.

The 1983–1984 season brought further disappointments for FC Nantes, as the departure of Thierry Tusseau to Bordeaux—against the club's wishes—disrupted the team's balance and serenity. The team faltered in the league (finishing 6th, nine points behind Bordeaux) and in Europe, where they were eliminated in the first round of the European Cup by Rapid Vienna, losing 0–3 away but winning 3–1 at home. This marked the beginning of a new era for the club, under more challenging conditions, at their new home, the Stade de la Beaujoire. While the stadium became a proud symbol for FCN, its often half-empty stands lacked the warmth and atmosphere of the old Stade Saupin.

Despite reclaiming second place in 1985, once again behind Bordeaux, FC Nantes struggled to compete financially with its rivals. Coach Jean-Claude Suaudeau had to accept the departure of his best players year after year. In 1985, the club lost key figures such as Maxime Bossis (to Matra Racing), Michel Bibard, and Fabrice Poullain (both to PSG), while new signings increasingly failed to match the quality of those who left. That same year, Nantes reinforced its squad with the solid defender Yvon Le Roux and the Argentine playmaker Jorge Burruchaga, considered one of the most gifted players in the club's history. (Note: Jean-Claude Suaudeau thinks so. (See "So Foot". No. 21. p. 40.)) Burruchaga would go on to become a World Cup champion with Argentina the following year. (Note: And decisive goalscorer in the final.) Despite these changes, Nantes maintained their position as league runners-up, this time behind PSG, and had an impressive run in the UEFA Cup. They eliminated Partizan Belgrade (1–1 away, followed by an offensive showcase with a 4–0 win at home) and Spartak Moscow (0–1 away, 1–1 at home). Their European journey ended with an honorable defeat against Inter Milan, losing 0–3 at San Siro but managing a thrilling 3–3 draw at home, after leading 3-1 for much of the match. (Note: The black mark on the evening of March 19, 1986 at La Beaujoire, however, was José Touré's injury, which deprived him of the World Cup and prevented him from playing in the yellow and green shirt until his departure for Bordeaux in the off-season, making his departure all the more sad.)

The 1986 season marked a period of significant decline for FC Nantes, as the club struggled to cope with the loss of several key players. José Touré moved to Bordeaux, Vahid Halilhodžić and William Ayache joined PSG, and the replacements brought in—Philippe Anziani, Patrice Garande, Julio Olarticoechea—did not measure up to the caliber of those they replaced. This loss of quality was compounded by a series of poor decisions under the leadership of Max Bouyer, who took over as president in December 1986. Bouyer's tenure saw the acquisition of high-profile but underperforming players such as Mo Johnston and Frankie Vercauteren in 1987, who were brought in at high prices with star status but failed to live up to expectations in their ways. While the club had been integrating talented young players for several seasons—such as Michel Der Zakarian, Antoine Kombouaré, and Didier Deschamps—this was not enough to offset the departures. Added to this was the misfortune of key player Jorge Burruchaga, who was sidelined with constant injuries starting in 1987. (Note: He even agreed to be reclassified as an amateur to make room for a foreigner in the squad.)

As a result, Nantes plunged in the standings. The constant upheavals prevented the team from maintaining its refined style of play, and there was little Jean-Claude Suaudeau could do to reverse the situation. FC Nantes finished 12th in 1987 and 10th in 1988. President Max Bouyer placed all the blame on the coach and dismissed him from his position. This marked the first true rupture in the club's history since 1960.

== Crisis and renewal (1988–2001) ==
=== The dark period under Bouyer and Blazevic (1988–1992) ===
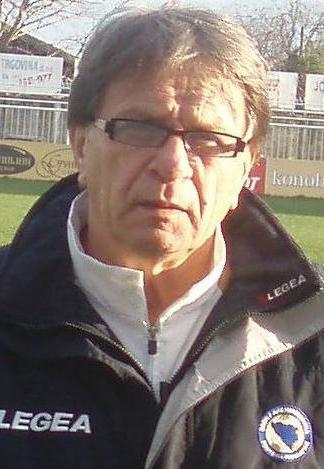
Miroslav Blazevic coached FC Nantes from 1988 to 1991.

Max Bouyer appointed Miroslav Blazevic, a Yugoslav coach with experience at Grasshopper-Club Zurich and Dinamo Zagreb, as the new manager. Immediate changes followed: Blazevic fielded his recruits, including Boris Diecket, Joël Henry, Jean-Claude Milani in goal, and William Ayache, who returned from Marseille. The most notable departures were Michel Der Zakarian and Jean-Pierre Bade, who had failed to convince. Blazevic's first season was relatively positive; he was well received by stars like Mo Johnston and Frankie Vercauteren, and the breakout player of the season, Didier Deschamps, was entrusted with the captain's armband at just 20 years old. The team finished in seventh place.

Despite some positive moments, FC Nantes' decline continued throughout the late 1980s and early 1990s, largely due to poor recruitment decisions. The club's recruitment strategy faltered: despite the arrival of Paul Le Guen, most of the recruits from Bouyer and Blazevic's partnership turned out to be costly failures, including Diecket and Milani in 1988–1989, Dragan Jakovljevic, who was disappointing in attack, and others like Claude Lowitz, Patrice Eyraud, and Thierry Fernier. Additionally, Max Bossis made a much-publicized but ultimately unnecessary return after a year of retirement. Off the field, another destabilizing issue arose with Didier Deschamps' potential departure. The young talent was sought after by the Olympique de Marseille (OM) of Bernard Tapie. Deschamps had initially been expected to leave in the summer of 1989, but he ultimately stayed before signing with OM in November. The agreement between Bouyer and Tapie occurred during a France-Cyprus match on November 18, 1989. Days later, despite not being fielded for the match, a suspicious atmosphere surrounded the negotiations, with questions raised about financial dealings related to the match. (Note: A few days before the match, OM paid 420,000 francs into a Swiss account held by Miroslav Blazevic: a simple transit in the transfer of a Yugoslav player, according to Blazevic.) On April 28, 1990, the tension surrounding Blazevic's relationship with OM reached a head when Nantes hosted Bordeaux. Blazevic revealed that he had agreed with Tapie to offer Nantes players a bonus if they beat Bordeaux, a club also competing for the title. Team captain Paul Le Guen rejected the offer on behalf of the players, and Nantes still won 2–1, with goals from Patrice Loko and Christophe Robert.

Disappointed by the team's performance and level of play, the public began to abandon Stade de la Beaujoire. On April 14, 1990, only 4,000 spectators attended a match against Toulon. The 1990–1991 season marked the failure of the Bouyer-Blazevic tandem. Results deteriorated in the fall, and from the 18th matchday (a 2–2 draw against Nice), FC Nantes failed to secure another victory. The 24th matchday was a disaster: on January 27, Nantes was crushed 6–0 by Marseille at the Stade Vélodrome. The following day, amid growing controversy surrounding Blazevic's leadership, he was dismissed from his position. Jean-Claude Suaudeau was immediately reinstated as head coach. After his dismissal in 1988, he had not received any compelling offers and had returned to the club's youth academy staff. Suaudeau managed to secure the team's survival in Ligue 1, with Nantes finishing 15th—the worst league position in their history since their promotion to the top flight. Despite the difficult season, hope was rekindled with Suaudeau's return and the emergence of several young talents developed under him and Raynald Denoueix. Players like Marcel Desailly, Patrice Loko, Nicolas Ouédec, Stéphane Ziani, Christian Karembeu, and Japhet N'Doram joined the senior squad at the start of the 1991–1992 season. N'Doram, in particular, quickly stood out for his extraordinary talent as a forward, earning the nickname "The Sorcerer," coined by teammate Joël Henry.

Despite a promising development on the field, FC Nantes continued to struggle financially. The end of Max Bouyer's presidency was overshadowed by the revelation of a significant 36-million franc deficit in January 1991. The club could not restore its financial balance, despite selling key players like Paul Le Guen (to PSG) and Christophe Robert (to Monaco). By the end of the season, the club had accumulated over 60 million francs in debt. The French National Division's Financial Control Committee (DNCG) forced Nantes into administrative relegation to Division 2, but Nantes managed to avoid this fate through a rescue plan backed by the local municipality, as well as regional and departmental support. The club was reorganized into two entities: FC Nantes, which oversaw the training center, and a separate professional sporting entity (SAOS). Bouyer resigned as president and was replaced by Guy Scherrer, the head of a Nantes-based biscuit company. Despite the financial challenges, Nantes remained in Division 1, but to balance the books, they were forced to sell off their best players. The departures included Thierry Bonalair, Jorge Burruchaga (finally recovered from injury), Marcel Desailly, Jean-Jacques Eydelie, Joël Henry, Johnny Mølby, and Jean-Louis Lima. This restructuring was seen as a necessary step for the club to regain financial stability and navigate through its challenging period.

=== Suaudeau II: The return to the top (1992–1997) ===
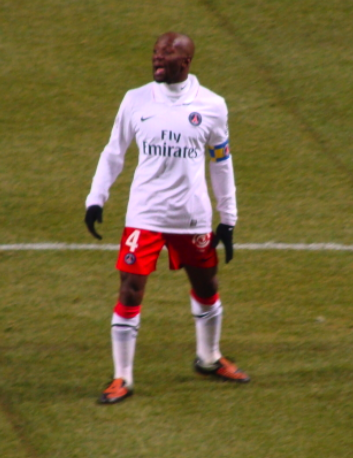
Claude Makelele, with the club from 1991 to 1997.

The 1992–1993 season marked a period of renewal for FC Nantes. The team, composed largely of young players developed at the club—such as Patrice Loko, Reynald Pedros, Christian Karembeu, Nicolas Ouédec, Laurent Guyot, and Jean-Michel Ferri—along with recruits like Japhet N'Doram, Claude Makelele, and Serge Le Dizet, began to show strong results. In the league, they finished in fifth place, securing a spot in the UEFA Cup, and in the Coupe de France, they reached the final. However, in the final against PSG, the youthful squad was undone by inexperience. After a questionable penalty for Paris, Nantes suffered three red cards and were decisively beaten 3–0. The only downside of the season was a home defeat to Marseille (0–2), a match shrouded in controversy. Rumors circulated during the game that Vulic, who was subbed off at halftime, had been bribed by OM representatives. These suspicions were later fueled by the OM-VA affair and certain aspects of the ensuing investigation.

Nantes celebrated its 50th anniversary winning an exhibition match against Botafogo 2–0. The 1993–1994 season saw continued success, with another fifth-place finish in the league, securing a UEFA Cup spot again, and a semi-final appearance in the Coupe de France. However, eliminations by Auxerre (0–1 at home) and Valencia CF in the UEFA Cup (1–1 at home, 1–3 at Mestalla) exposed a lack of experience in critical moments. After one year, Noureddine Naybet, a promising young player, left for Sporting CP.

The core of the young team remained intact for the 1994–1995 season, which became a record-breaking year for FC Nantes. The team went 32 matches unbeaten, (Note: From Matchday 1 to Matchday 32, a record still to be beaten. The 33rd matchday was the only one in which Nantes lost that season, to Strasbourg (2-0), also a record.) had the best attack (71 goals scored) and best defense (34 goals conceded), with two players finishing on the podium of the top scorers: Patrice Loko (1st with 22 goals) and Nicolas Ouédec (3rd with 18 goals). Jean-Claude Suaudeau was named the best coach of the year. Nantes fans grew accustomed to the "home rate," where the Canaries scored three goals per match at La Beaujoire—this happened 10 times in 19 games, including four 3-0 victories. A highlight of the season was the victory against the defending champions, PSG, on August 19, 1994. Loko scored the only goal of the match after a fast and instinctive team movement that showcased the collective work of the team. The sequence began with a long clearance from Karembeu, which went out for a throw-in. Cauet picked up the ball and quickly passed it to Pedros, who had called for it. A one-two between Pedros and Loko followed, and Loko's volleyed finish, struck with his right foot, found the left corner of the goal, leaving PSG's goalkeeper Lama helpless. This move, which seemed to defy the laws of physics with the ball barely touching the ground, was a result of hours of practice, especially in the "pit" at La Jonelière, a hard court surrounded by three concrete walls that encouraged quick, one-touch play. Nantes' collective play was a key feature of their success, particularly the role of holding midfielders like Jean-Michel Ferri. This type of player would become more common in the football world in the years to come. Moreover, the team's approach to recovery was very much a collective effort, with no single player solely responsible for winning back possession. Suaudeau emphasized, "I conceive attacking play through recovery, that's one of the club's great principles." Speed was also a key element, compensating for certain technical weaknesses. Suaudeau explained: "Technically, the 1995 team was very average, less strong than the team of 1983, for example. The option I chose was: fine, we have technical flaws, but we need to surprise the opposition. So, we played at full speed. And that was very spectacular." Despite these successes, the season wasn't without flaws. In the Coupe de France, Nantes suffered a surprising defeat to Saint-Leu (from the third division) in a penalty shootout. In the UEFA Cup, the team faced a significant setback due to injuries to all three goalkeepers. They were replaced by goalkeeper coach Jean-Louis Garcia, but the team was still defeated 5–1 by Bayer Leverkusen, a result too heavy to overcome despite a 0–0 draw at home.

FC Nantes lost two of its best players before the 1995–1996 season: Patrice Loko joined PSG, and Christian Karembeu moved to Sampdoria. The Canaries, further weakened by a long injury to Nicolas Ouédec, finished in seventh place. However, Nantes showcased their talent in the Champions League. After qualifying from Group A and defeating Spartak Moscow in the quarterfinals, they reached the semifinals to face Didier Deschamps' Juventus. The Italians took advantage of Nantes' inexperience. In Turin, Carotti was sent off for a simulation by Michele Padovano, while Éric Decroix was sent off after being elbowed by the same Padovano (who broke his nose) without any sanction. The score was clear: 2–0 to Juve. "Nantes continues to learn, but the problem is that we don't always learn the lesson," said Suaudeau. In the return match, Juventus capitalized on their early dominance with a goal from Vialli, but Nantes equalized in the 44th minute thanks to Éric Decroix. In the second half, Paulo Sousa restored Juventus' lead, but Nantes won the match 3–2, with goals from N'Doram and Renou. However, Juventus qualified and went on to win the final against Ajax Amsterdam. Despite these successes, Suaudeau feared the disintegration of his team: "We can't stay together. In Nantes, we never stay together. Well, maybe for a season. That's how it is... In this competition, there's no secret: you need players of European level. We become that. But they don't stay."

Cauet, Kosecki, Ouédec, Pedros, and Renou leave the club. The start of the 1996–1997 season was not considered the best, with ten matches without a win at the start of the championship. The furious public turns against the club's management and the recruitment of Robert Budzynski. However, a turning point finally comes on October 5th against Nice. The Canaries deliver a huge win (7–0) with seven different goalscorers. From then on, the trend reversed, and FC Nantes remains undefeated for 30 matches (just two matches short of the 1995 record). Japhet N'Doram scores 21 goals, just behind the league's top scorer, Stéphane Guivarc'h (22 goals). Nantes misses out on Champions League qualification again: on the last day, the Canaries are beaten 2–1 at Monaco after a goal by Le Roux is wrongly ruled offside, even though a draw would have been enough to finish second instead of PSG. The young Mickaël Landreau (17 years old) establishes himself in goal. Against Bastia in the autumn, when Nantes was at its lowest point, in his first start (due to injuries to Casagrande and Loussouarn), he helped secure a 0–0 draw by saving a penalty from Lubomir Moravcik. Reassuring and hardworking, he is kept in goal by Suaudeau for the rest of the season. Additionally, shaken by the poor start to the season, President Guy Scherrer resigned on October 30, 1996, and was replaced by Jean-René Toumelin.

A new chapter begins in the offseason. Once again faced with the departure of several key players (N'Doram, Makelele, and Pignol), Jean-Claude Suaudeau decides to step down one week before the start of the championship. Raynald Denoueix, director of the training center and groomed for this position since 1995, as well as a finalist in the Gambardella Cup with the youth team in 1996, succeeds him. Suaudeau remains at the club for one final season to help with the transition and to assist in overseeing training.

=== Denoueix, guardian of the values (1997–2001) ===
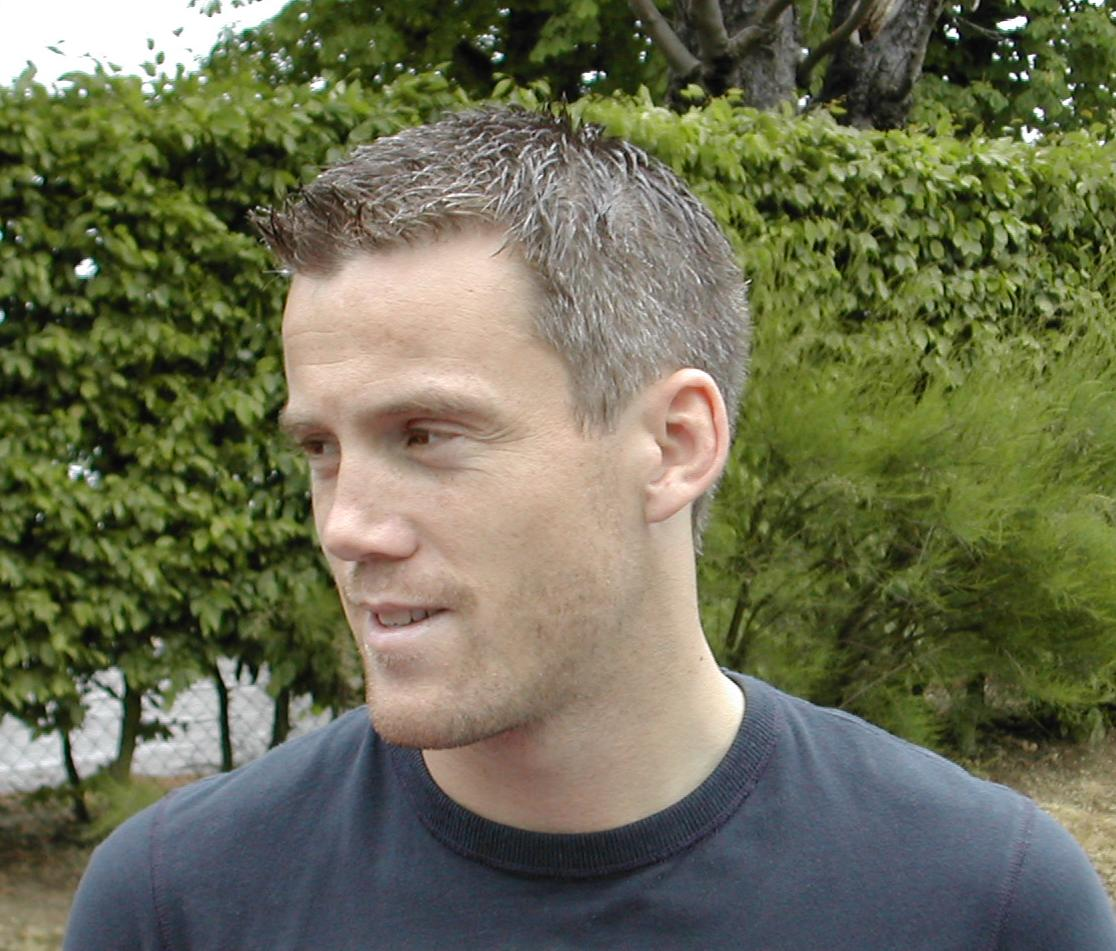
Mickaël Landreau embodies the new generation led by Raynald Denoueix, with two cups and one championship to his name.

The coach and former club trainer Raynald Denoueix was reunited with players he helped develop, such as Mickaël Landreau, Jean-Michel Ferri, Frédéric Da Rocha, Nicolas Savinaud, and the new professionals Éric Carrière, Olivier Monterrubio, and Salomon Olembe. However, the team remained weakened by years of departures that have not been adequately replaced. The 1997–1998 season was disappointing across all competitions (11th in the league, early exits in the cups). The recruitment aimed to be more ambitious in the summer of 1998 with three notable arrivals: Néstor Fabbri, an Argentine international who had been selected for the 1990 World Cup, Antoine Sibierski, who sought to relaunch his career after unfounded doping allegations during his time at AJ Auxerre, and finally Argentine striker Diego Bustos, who impressed early in the season but was then sidelined by an injury. Kléber Bobin also replaced Jean-René Toumelin as president of the club. The FCNA, led by new captain Mickaël Landreau, improved, finishing 7th in the league and winning the Coupe de France after a lackluster final against Sedan, where a controversial penalty (for simulation) converted by Monterrubio (58th minute) sealed the victory. Young players make their mark: Éric Carrière and Charles Devineau in midfield, Sébastien Piocelle as a defensive midfielder, and Olivier Monterrubio, named the best young player of the league.

In the 1999–2000 season, the team played attractive football but struggled with finishing. FCNA has a tough league campaign, finishing 12th but securing survival on the last day with a victory at Le Havre in a tense match. Led by Sibierski, who scored 23 goals in all competitions, the team achieved some notable performances. In the UEFA Cup, Nantes progressed through two rounds and faced Arsène Wenger's Arsenal FC. The Gunners dominated the Canaries 3–0 in the first leg at Highbury, but Nantes showed resilience in the return leg: Sibierski opened the scoring, and though Gilles Grimandi, Thierry Henry, and Marc Overmars put Arsenal ahead, Sibierski and young Marama Vahirua equalize (3-3). In the Coupe de France, the Canaries retained their title in a tense final against the amateur side Calais, backed by the entire Stade de France. A last-minute penalty by Sibierski gave FCNA the victory, once again in controversial circumstances as Alain Caveglia was fouled just outside the penalty area.

In the summer of 2000, Nantes lost Antoine Sibierski, who moved to Lens to meet his salary demands but strengthened its squad with key signings, including full-back Nicolas Laspalles, Sylvain Armand, Stéphane Ziani (a club-trained player loaned from Bordeaux), and striker Viorel Moldovan, who is brought in from Fenerbahçe SK for a club-record transfer fee of 40 million francs. These investments were facilitated by the sale of the club. After the club's finances were cleared up since 1992, the city sold FCNA to Socpresse. After a slow start to the season, the team began to take shape: young Sylvain Armand emerged as a left-back, Mathieu Berson became key in the defensive midfield role, with Éric Carrière taking on the role of playmaker as a central midfielder. Ziani and Frédéric Da Rocha provide width on the wings, Moldovan is close to reaching his best physical level, and Monterrubio benefits from Moldovan's presence in the box, exploiting space. The Canaries enjoy a five-match winning streak in November and go into the holiday break at the top of the league. In the second half of the season, they got eight victories, largely due to the rise of Vahirua, an unstoppable substitute (7 goals) who helped the club secure its eighth title with a 1–0 win over Saint-Étienne on May 12. The club came close to winning a double of the league and cup but is halted in the semi-finals of both the Coupe de France by Strasbourg and the Coupe de la Ligue by Lyon. In the UEFA Cup, the Canaries were narrowly eliminated by FC Porto (3–1 at the Estádio das Antas, 2–1 at the Beaujoire, aggregate score 4–3) in the Round of 16. The Nantes triumph was complete: Éric Carrière was the league's top assist provider (11 assists) and was named the league's best player, while Raynald Denoueix was awarded best coach at the Football Oscars. Moreover, Éric Carrière (wearing the No. 10 shirt in Zidane's absence), Mickaël Landreau, and Nicolas Gillet were selected for the French national team for the 2001 Confederations Cup.

What was unknown by the Canaries was that the club will go from glory to despair in just six months. The summer, which was supposed to be ambitious (with the recruitment of Pierre-Yves André, Olivier Quint, and the purchase of Stéphane Ziani's contract), saw the departures of Olivier Monterrubio and, most notably, Éric Carrière, who had committed to staying. (Note: Éric Carrière leaves the club just as the championship begins, on August 28.) In the group stage of the Champions League, Nantes was the only French club to qualify, notably with victories over PSV Eindhoven (4–1 at the Beaujoire) and Lazio Rome (1–3 at the Stadio Olimpico, 1–0 at the Beaujoire). However, deprived of its playmaker, FC Nantes was not able to win its first league match until the 11th round and remains in the relegation zone until the winter break. FC Nantes, now managed by Jean-Luc Gripond, who replaced Kléber Bobin at the helm under the Socpresse group, decides to part ways with Raynald Denoueix, the reigning champion and heir to a sporting tradition upheld since 1960.

== The 2000s: when the crisis becomes chronic ==
=== An inevitable relegation (2001–2007) ===
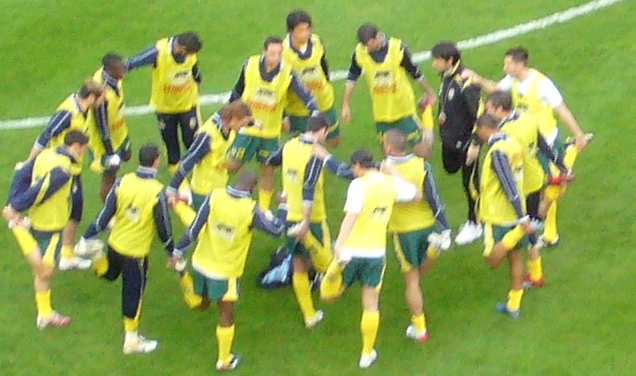
Players warming up in 2007.

Angel Marcos, a former striker for the club, (Note: Four seasons (1971–1975), 82 matches and 34 league goals, French champion in 1973.) takes over as coach of FC Nantes and benefits from the arrival of two key recruits, defenders Mario Yepes and Mauro Cetto. At the start of 2002, there was an improvement in the results: the last match under Raynald Denoueix marks the beginning of a six-match unbeaten run, with 16 points out of a possible 18. The Canaries even finish third in the league's second half. (Note: With 30 points, compared with 33 for Lyon and 32 for Lens.) The most intense match of the season remains the draw against Manchester United, featuring David Beckham, Ryan Giggs, and Ruud van Nistelrooy (1-1) in the Champions League's second phase: Nantes leads throughout the match, with Van Nistelrooy only equalizing in the dying moments with a penalty. Focused on the league, Nantes finished last in their group, which also included Boavista and Bayern Munich.

The 2002–2003 season confirmed the speed of the decline of the club. Néstor Fabbri, a historic figure for FC Nantes, left the club. The biggest transfer in the club's history (6 million euros), the young Portuguese striker of Congolese origin Ariza Makukula, turns out to be a complete disappointment (18 matches, 1 goal). The team no longer exhibited the form of spring 2002, offering a weakened offensive game and playing a secondary role in the league, finishing in ninth place in the final standings. In the Coupe de la Ligue, Nantes eliminated PSG at the Parc des Princes in the Round of 16 (2–3), due to a penalty save from specialist Mickaël Landreau: facing Ronaldinho, the goalkeeper stands well off-center to the left, and the striker, disturbed, hesitates before shooting on Landreau. But FC Nantes was then eliminated in the quarter-finals. Angel Marcos, in conflict with the players on the team, was dismissed at the end of the season. Loïc Amisse, coach of the reserve team and a historic figure at the club, took over. The team was weakened by the departures of Viorel Moldovan, whose contract expired, and Éric Djemba Djemba, who emerged in midfield that season and was quickly sold to Manchester United. The first part of the 2003–2004 season was consequently underwhelming (27 points at the halfway point, 9th place). Mid-season, Moldovan returned to the club after canceling his contract with Al Wahda Abu Dhabi, and Ivorian Gilles Yapi-Yapo joined Stéphane Ziani to strengthen the attacking midfield. Moldovan made a strong comeback, scoring eleven goals in twelve league matches. FC Nantes improved, finished 6th in the league, and had solid cup runs, reaching the final of the Coupe de la Ligue and the semi-finals of the Coupe de France, both lost on penalties.

The summer of 2004 marks a decisive moment in the deterioration of the club. While the takeover of Socpresse by Serge Dassault makes the industrialist the new owner of FC Nantes, club president Jean-Luc Gripond approves the sale of seven key players: Mario Yepes, Sylvain Armand, Marama Vahirua, Stéphane Ziani, Mathieu Berson, along with the departure of Nicolas Gillet and Viorel Moldovan at the end of their contracts. These departures were not compensated, and Gripond faced widespread criticism. By Christmas, as the club sits in 17th place in the league, captain Mickaël Landreau publicly criticized his president and coach Loïc Amisse, soon replaced by Serge Le Dizet, the director of the training center and coach of the reserve team. Despite some positive highlights, like the title of best young player for Jérémy Toulalan and strong early performances from young Romanian striker Claudiu Keserü, the club was second to last in the standings with one game left and only saves its top-flight status with a 1–0 victory over Metz, combined with defeats for Caen and Bastia. This marked the worst finish for the club since its promotion to the top division in 1963. The season ends in a toxic atmosphere, and shareholder Serge Dassault decided the fate of Jean-Luc Gripond before the final match. Rudi Roussillon, Dassault's right-hand man, became the new president of FC Nantes, as the club transitions to a Société par actions simplifiée (SASP) with a new board of directors. In October, sporting director Robert Budzynski was replaced by Japhet N'Doram. After the 10th matchday, Nantes stagnated and never exceeded 12th place. Behind the scenes, the club faced serious financial difficulties, with accumulated deficits of 16 million euros from the previous two seasons, 9 million of which come from the 2004–2005 season alone, covered by the Dassault group. The team was weakened by the departures of Jérémy Toulalan, who became a key player at Olympique Lyonnais, and captain Mickaël Landreau, whose contract was not renewed by former president Gripond after the "coup" in December 2004. Landreau refused to extend his contract and announced his departure for Paris SG at the end of the season. Nicolas Savinaud and Frédéric Da Rocha were the only players from the 2001 title-winning team remaining at the club.

For the 2006–2007 season, Rudi Roussillon announced heightened ambitions, setting sixth place as the club's objective. However, the start of the season was disastrous. After six matchdays, Nantes sat in 19th place, leading to the dismissal of Serge Le Dizet, who was replaced by Georges Eo, a long-time assistant coach (since 1987) and a familiar figure to Roussillon, (Note: Roussillon was substitute goalkeeper for Red Star (1979–1982), while Eo was player-coach (from 1980).) having declared his candidacy for the position just two weeks earlier. Despite the high-profile signing of Fabien Barthez in January, the situation did not improve. Following a crushing 2–5 home defeat against Valenciennes on the 24th matchday, Georges Eo was also dismissed. He was replaced by his own assistant, Michel Der Zakarian, who took over in a tandem with Japhet N'Doram. Amid growing criticism from club legends, mounting pressure from shareholders, questions surrounding the club's management, and persistent rumors of a sale, Nantes remained stuck at the bottom of the table from the 30th matchday onward. Ultimately, FC Nantes Atlantique was relegated, ending a remarkable run of 44 consecutive seasons in the top tier of French football.

=== Kita, a missed rupture (since 2007) ===
As an immediate consequence of relegation, Rudi Roussillon resigns and is replaced by Luc Dayan, the former president of Lille. Dayan confirms Michel Der Zakarian in his role and relies on Xavier Gravelaine to prepare the team for Ligue 2, replacing Japhet N'Doram, from whom Dayan parts ways. The team underwent almost a complete overhaul for the 2007–2008 season, with eighteen departures and eleven arrivals (excluding loan returns), prioritizing players experienced in Ligue 2, such as David De Freitas, Nicolas Goussé, and Harlington Shereni. With the departure of Nicolas Savinaud at the end of his contract, only Frédéric Da Rocha remains to represent the club's traditional values, having started under Jean-Claude Suaudeau. The new president, officially tasked with "seeking capital partners," prepares the sale of the club, as Dassault no longer wishes to continue ownership. The Franco-Polish businessman Waldemar Kita, previously known for leading Lausanne-Sport to bankruptcy, became the owner of Nantes on August 2. He presents himself as "a football enthusiast" who will "give all [his] heart and expertise to the future of this club." However, he reveals that he does not intend to restore the club's traditional identity: "Arribas, Suaudeau, Budzynski did a great job. We will not do the same thing again." He expressed his desire for a break from the past by surrounding himself with newcomers, such as the technical director Christian Larièpe.

The season begins very well on the pitch (7 wins and only 1 loss in the first 10 matches), but the team ultimately loses the title to Le Havre. As the return to Ligue 1 approaches, President Kita makes a point of never staying idle. In addition to numerous signings at the end of the summer and during the winter, announcements follow one another, such as the adoption of a new crest inspired by FC Barcelona after an online vote, the installation of heated benches at the stadium, an audit followed by a proposed social plan, a change of kit supplier, and even a project to replace La Beaujoire stadium. Locally, however, the public is less excited about the team's progress in Ligue 2 than about the achievements of the amateur team Carquefou, who reached the quarter-finals of the Coupe de France after eliminating Marseille, before being knocked out by PSG. These two matches are played at La Beaujoire in front of sold-out crowds, while the FC Nantes matches see their lowest attendance in over ten years. (Note: There were also 28,000 spectators for the Le Poiré-sur-Vie Vendée soccer-PSG match, in the 1/16th final.)

Back in Ligue 1, Nantes waits six matches before securing their first victory (against Valenciennes, 2–0). Michel Der Zakarian is fired after three games; interim coach Christian Larièpe suffers a heavy 4–1 home defeat against Le Mans; and Élie Baup, appointed afterward, fails to turn the situation around. (Note: 3 M€ for Michael Gravgaard who is on loan to Hamburg at the mercato, around 3 M€ also for Guirane N'Daw, while Ivan Klasnic, who is free, is offered a salary of between one and two million euros.) The new signings failed to justify their hefty price tags, and the team struggled to break free from the relegation zone throughout the season. Ultimately, Nantes finished in 19th place, facing consistent difficulties, particularly in attack, where they scored a disappointing thirty-three goals. This paltry total was only surpassed by Le Havre, who performed worse offensively. The supporters express their frustration, especially during the final match against Auxerre (2–1), with a quarter-hour strike by the Brigade Loire, followed by acts of violence and vandalism. Captain Frédéric Da Rocha, whose contract is not renewed, complains about the lack of a development policy, while the club's youth team reaches the final of the Coupe Gambardella, which they lose 2–0 against Montpellier. Jean-Claude Suaudeau mentions the desire to break from the past expressed by some of the club's leaders: "The results suggest that they have probably made a mistake." Michel Der Zakarian, in contrast, calls for "a return to the basics, namely youth development."

== Bibliography ==
- Garnier, Alain (1973). F.C. Nantes : la passe de trois [F.C. Nantes: three in a row] (in French). Solar.
- Étienne, Jacques (1977). Henri Michel, football quand tu nous tiens [Henri Michel, soccer when you want it] (in French). Alta.
- Chauvière, Jean-Claude (1977). Allez les jaunes !... [Go yellow!...] (in French). Calmann-Lévy.
- Verret, Bernard (1981). Les grandes heures du FC Nantes [The great hours of FC Nantes] (in French). PAC.
- Lorant, Jean-Marie (1983). Bossis, Maxi Max (in French). Calmann-Lévy.
- Verret, Bernard (1995). Le chant des Canaris [Canary Song] (in French). Leader.
- Santerre, Jean-Claude (2000). La vie en jaune - Petite histoire du FC Nantes de 1963 à 1999 [La vie en jaune - A short history of FC Nantes from 1963 to 1999] (in French). Le petit véhicule.
- Minier, Pierre (2003). Football Club de Nantes, Le doyen de l'élite - 1943-2003 [Soccer Club de Nantes, The doyen of the elite - 1943–2003] (in French). Les cahiers intempestifs.
- Batard, Yannick (2005). FC Nantes : une équipe, une légende [FC Nantes: one team, one legend] (in French). Cheminements.
- Minier, Pierre (2007). FCNA - Football Club Nantes Atlantique [FCNA - Football Club Nantes Atlantique] (in French). Calmann-Lévy.
