= List of FC Nantes players =

This is a list of notable footballers who have played for FC Nantes. Generally, this means those who appeared in 100 or more first-class (league, Coupe de France, Coupe de la Ligue and European) matches for the club. However, some players who have played fewer matches are also included, if they fell short of the total of 100 appearances but made significant contributions to the history of the club. For a full list of all Nantes players with Wikipedia articles, see Category:FC Nantes players.

Players are listed according to the date of their first professional contract signed with the club. Appearances and goals are for competitive first-team matches only. Substitute appearances included. Players whose nationality contains a link (in blue) to their country won full international caps, whilst at Nantes or elsewhere.

== List of players ==
As of 1 September 2017

Name	Nationality	Pos.	Nantes career	Apps	Goals	Notes
Seth Adonkor	France	MF	1980-1984	134	2	
Loïc Amisse	France	LW	1973-1990	602	11	Manager of Nantes, 2003-2004
Hassan Ahamada	France	FW	1999-2005	102	9	
Christian Amy	France	GK	1950-1954	109	0	
Sylvain Armand	France	DF	2000-2004	158	12	
William Ayache	France	DF	1976-1986, 1988-1989	256	2	
Ángel Bargas	Argentina	RB	1973-1979	228	14	
Bruno Baronchelli	France	RW	1974-1987	391	81	
Mathieu Berson	France	MF	1999-2004	160	7	
Jean-Paul Bertrand-Demanes	France	GK	1969-1988	649	0	Holds the record for most appearances for FC Nantes
Vincent Bessat	France	FW	2011-2015	127	7	
Michel Bibard	France	RB	1976-1985	192	6	Gold medalist at the 1984 Olympic Games
Bernard Blanchet	France	FW	1961-1974	467	140	Nantes highest scorer in Division 1/Ligue 1
Thierry Bonalair	France	LB	1987-1992	146	2	
Maxime Bossis	France	DF	1973-1985, 1990-1991	498	23	French Player of the Year in 1979 and 1981
Vincent Bracigliano	France	MF	1985-1989	130	5	
Robert Budzynski	France	DF	1963-1969	199	2	
Jorge Burruchaga	Argentina	MF	1985-1992	163	30	Scored the winning goal in the 1986 World Cup Final
Eddy Capron	France	DF	1990-1997	175	4	
Bruno Carotti	France	DF/MF	1995-1998	107	5	
Eric Carrière	France	MF	1996-2001	169	18	
Jean-Marc Chanelet	France	FB	1995-2000	190	4	
Frédéric Da Rocha	France	MF	1995-2009	498	55	
Fabien Debotté	France	MF	1981-1993	136	2	
Éric Decroix	France	DF	1994-1999	189	7	
Pascal Delhommeau	France	DF	1998-2006	153	1	
Gabriel De Michèle	France	LB	1963-1975	462	1	
Raynald Denoueix	France	FB	1968-1979	106	0	Manager of Nantes, 1997-2001
Marcel Desailly	France	DF/MF	1986-1992	178	5	
Didier Deschamps	France	MF	1985-1989	123	4	World Cup winning captain for France (1998)
Michel Der Zakarian	(Armenian Soviet Socialist Republic) Armenia	DF	1981-1988	166	2	Manager of FC Nantes, 2007-2008 and 2012-2016
Filip Đorđević	Serbia	FW	2008-2014	198	68	
Daniel Eon	France	GK	1956-1968	258	0	
Jean-Jacques Eydelie	France	DF/MF	1984-1986, 1988-1992	142	6	
Néstor Fabbri	Argentina	DF	1998-2002	159	12	
Jean-Michel Ferri	France	MF	1987-1998	335	24	
Jean-Michel Fouché	France	GK	1965-1972	119	0	
Bernard Gardon	France	DF	1969-1974	125	0	
Nicolas Gillet	France	DF	1997-2004	202	17	
Philippe Gondet	France	FW	1960-1971	272	143	French Player of the Year in 1965 and 1966
Jocelyn Gourvennec	France	MF	1995-1998	104	29	
Jean Guillot	France	FW	1961-1965	105	32	
Laurent Guyot	France	LB	1988-1998	221	6	
Vahid Halilhodžić	(Socialist Federal Republic of Yugoslavia) Yugoslavia	FW	1981-1986	192	112	
Joël Henry	France	MF	1988-1992	118	8	
Christian Karembeu	France	MF	1990-1995	153	6	
Antoine Kombouaré	France	DF	1984-1990	202	5	
Mickaël Landreau	France	GK	1996-2006	416	0	
Gilbert Le Chenadec	France	DF	1960-1967	207	10	
Serge Le Dizet	France	RB	1992-1998	201	0	Manager of Nantes, 2005-2006
Patrice Loko	France	FW	1988-1995	206	49	
Erich Maas	West Germany	FW	1970-1975	179	48	
Claude Makélélé	France	MF	1992-1997	205	12	
David Marraud	France	GK	1985-1996	316	0	
Henri Michel	France	DF	1966-1982	638	95	Most Division 1 (Ligue 1) appearances for Nantes
Olivier Monterrubio	France	LW	1996-2001	113	35	
Pierre Morice	France	MF	1980-1987	174	13	
Oscar Muller	Argentina	MF	1974-1984	244	38	His father, Ramón Muller, also played for Nantes
Japhet N'Doram	Chad	FW	1990-1997	224	81	Manager of Nantes, February–July 2007
Salomon Olembé	Cameroon	MF	1997-2001	141	8	
Jean-Claude Osman	France	RB	1967-1978	322	9	
Nicolas Ouédec	France	FW	1989-1996	185	84	
Michel Pech	France	MF	1968-1975	258	59	
Éric Pécout	France	FW	1974-1981	200	96	
Reynald Pedros	France	LW	1990-1996	184	34	
Fabrice Picot	France	MF	1977-1984	110	19	
Jean-Jacques Pierre	Haiti	DF	2005-2011	159	5	
Christophe Pignol	France	DF	1993-1997	141	4	
Fabrice Poullain	France	MF	1980-1985	122	7	
Olivier Quint	France	MF	2001-2006	145	12	
Gilles Rampillon	France	MF/FW	1971-1982	415	111	
Patrice Rio	France	DF	1970-1984	536	33	Son of France international forward Roger Rio
Christophe Robert	France	LW	1981-1991	215	40	
Claude Robin	France	DF/MF	1965-1969	120	10	
Omar Sahnoun	France	MF/FW	1972-1979	132	26	
Nicolas Savinaud	France	DF	1995-2007	371	29	
Jacky Simon	France	FW	1963-1968	183	96	
Jean-Claude Suaudeau	France	MF	1960-1969	272	28	Manager of Nantes, 1982-1991 and 1991-1997
Jérémy Toulalan	France	MF	2001-2006	121	2	
José Touré	France	MF/FW	1979-1986	208	73	
Adrien Trebel	France	MF	2011-2014	105	5	
Thierry Tusseau	France	LB	1974-1983	295	17	
Marama Vahirua	(French Polynesia) Tahiti	FW	1998-2004	145	40	France Under-21 international
Olivier Veigneau	France	DF	2011-2015	127	3	
Jordan Veretout	France	MF	2011-2015	131	14	
Thierno Youm	Senegal	FW	1987-1992	159	37	
Stéphane Ziani	France	MF	1991-1994, 2000-2004	242	19	
