= 1996–97 FC Nantes Atlantique season =

Nantes Atlantique
1996–97 season
- Manager: Jean-Claude Suaudeau
- Stadium: Stade de la Beaujoire
- Division 1: 3rd
- Coupe de France: Round of 64
- Coupe de la Ligue: Round of 16
- Intertoto Cup: Semi-finals
- Top goalscorer: Japhet N'Doram (21)
- Average home league attendance: 20,725

The 1996–97 season was the 54th season in the existence of Nantes Atlantique and the club's 35th consecutive season in the top flight of French football.

== Season summary ==
During the 1996–97 French football season, Nantes Atlantique competed in the French Division 1, Coupe de France, Coupe de la Ligue and UEFA Intertoto Cup.

Nantes Atlantique finished third in Division 1, thus qualifying for the 1997–98 UEFA Cup. At the end of the season, manager Jean-Claude Suaudeau, tired of his best players being sold in order to clear the club's debts, retired from football at the end of the season; he was replaced by the club's youth academy manager, Raynald Denoueix.

== First-team squad ==
Note: Flags indicate national team as defined under FIFA eligibility rules; some limited exceptions apply. Players may hold more than one non-FIFA nationality.

No.	Pos.	Nation	Player
—	GK	FRA	Dominique Casagrande
—	GK	FRA	Mickaël Landreau
—	DF	FRA	Eddy Capron
—	DF	FRA	Bruno Carotti (Note: Carotti was born in Palma de Mallorca, Spain.)
—	DF	FRA	Éric Decroix
—	DF	FRA	Serge Le Dizet
—	DF	FRA	Christophe Pignol
—	DF	FRA	Nicolas Savinaud
—	MF	FRA	Eric Carrière
—	MF	FRA	Frédéric Da Rocha
—	MF	FRA	Jean-Michel Ferri

No.	Pos.	Nation	Player
—	MF	FRA	Jocelyn Gourvennec
—	MF	FRA	Christophe Le Roux
—	MF	FRA	Mehdi Leroy
—	MF	FRA	Claude Makélélé
—	MF	FRA	Olivier Monterrubio
—	FW	FRA	Alioune Touré
—	FW	YUG	Nenad Bjeković
—	FW	ARG	Javier Mazzoni
—	FW	TUN	Adel Sellimi
—	FW	CHA	Japhet N'Doram

== Reserve squad ==
Note: Flags indicate national team as defined under FIFA eligibility rules; some limited exceptions apply. Players may hold more than one non-FIFA nationality.

No.	Pos.	Nation	Player
—	DF	FRA	Nicolas Gillet

== Competitions ==
=== French Division 1 ===
==== League table ====
Pos	Team	Pld	W	D	L	GF	GA	GD	Pts	Qualification or relegation
1	Monaco (C)	38	23	10	5	69	30	+39	79	Qualification to Champions League group stage
2	Paris Saint-Germain	38	18	13	7	57	31	+26	67	Qualification to Champions League second qualifying round
3	Nantes	38	16	16	6	61	32	+29	64	Qualification to UEFA Cup first round
4	Bordeaux	38	16	15	7	59	42	+17	63	Qualification to UEFA Cup first round
5	Metz	38	17	11	10	40	30	+10	62	Qualification to UEFA Cup first round

Source: Ligue 1
Rules for classification: 1) points; 2) goal difference; 3) number of goals scored.
(C) Champions

==== Results summary ====
Overall								Home						Away					
Pld	W	D	L	GF	GA	GD	Pts	W	D	L	GF	GA	GD	W	D	L	GF	GA	GD
38	16	16	6	61	32	+29	64	8	8	3	37	16	+21	8	8	3	24	16	+8

Source: Ligue 1

==== Results by round ====
Round	1	2	3	4	5	6	7	8	9	10	11	12	13	14	15	16	17	18	19	20	21	22	23	24	25	26	27	28	29	30	31	32	33	34	35	36	37	38
Ground	H	A	H	A	H	A	H	A	H	A	H	A	H	A	H	A	H	H	A	H	A	H	A	H	A	H	A	H	A	H	A	H	A	H	A	A	H	A
Result	L	D	L	L	D	L	L	D	D	D	W	D	W	W	W	D	W	D	D	W	W	D	W	D	W	D	W	W	W	W	D	D	W	D	W	D	W	L
Position	17	16	17	19	17	18	18	18	18	18	17	17	16	16	13	14	11	13	13	10	8	9	8	8	8	7	6	6	6	3	5	4	3	3	3	3	2	3

Source: Ligue 1
A = Away; H = Home; W = Win; D = Draw; L = Loss

=== Coupe de France ===
15 January 1997 Round of 64	ES Vitrolles	2–1	Nantes	Stade Jules-Ladoumègue, Vitrolles
			Sellimi 57'	Attendance: 1,500

=== UEFA Intertoto Cup ===
==== Group stage ====
Pos	Team	Pld	W	D	L	GF	GA	GD	Pts	Qualification	NAN	LIL	HEE	KAU	SLI
1	(France) Nantes	4	3	1	0	12	7	+5	10	Advanced to semi-finals	—	—	3–1	3–1	—
2	(Norway) Lillestrøm	4	3	0	1	11	4	+7	9		2–3	—	—	—	4–0
3	(Netherlands) Heerenveen	4	1	1	2	4	5	−1	4		—	0–1	—	3–1	—
4	(Lithuania) Kaunas	4	1	0	3	4	10	−6	3		—	1–4	—	—	1–0
5	(Republic of Ireland) Sligo Rovers	4	0	2	2	3	8	−5	2		3–3	—	0–0	—	—

Source: rsssf.com

29 June 1996 1	Nantes (France)	3–1	(Lithuania) Kaunas	Stade de la Beaujoire, Nantes
	N'Doram 4', 60'; Gourvennec 65'		Žalys 68'	Attendance: 3,355; Referee: Livio Bazzoli (Italy)

6 July 1996 2	Sligo Rovers (Republic of Ireland)	3–3	(France) Nantes	The Showgrounds, Sligo
	Kenny 13'; Hawtin 20'; Rooney 70'		Gourvennec 21'; N'Doram 23'; Carotti 76' (pen.)	Attendance: 1,055; Referee: Jürgen Aust (Germany)

13 July 1996 3	Nantes (France)	3–1	(Netherlands) Heerenveen	Stade de la Beaujoire, Nantes
	Kosecki 7'; N'Doram 67'; Le Roux 78'		Tomasson 2'	Attendance: 2,217; Referee: Celino Gracia Redondo (Spain)

20 July 1996 4	Lillestrøm (Norway)	2–3	(France) Nantes	Åråsen Stadion, Lillestrøm
	Strandli 65', 68'		N'Doram 42', 56'; Le Roux 54'	Attendance: 1,724; Referee: Jarmo Karhunen (Finland)

==== Semi-final ====
28 July 1996 First leg	Standard Liège (Belgium)	2–1	(France) Nantes	Stade Maurice Dufrasne, Liège
	Schepens 60' (pen.); Lawarée 73'		Carotti 43'	Attendance: 3,000; Referee: Charles Agius (Malta)

31 July 1996 Second leg	Nantes (France)	0–1 (1–3 agg.)	(Belgium) Standard Liège	Stade de la Beaujoire, Nantes
			Edmilson 86'	Attendance: 9,000; Referee: Ilca Koho (Finland)
