= Alain Michel (football manager) =

French football manager (born 1948)

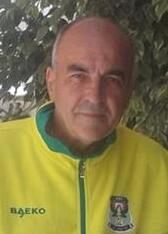
- Michel in 2014

Personal information
- Date of birth: 30 August 1948 (age 78)

Managerial career
- Years: Team
- 1977–1983: Union sportive Mer
- 1983–1994: Bourges
- 1994–1997: Louhans-Cuiseaux
- 1997–2001: Grenoble
- 2001: Saint-Étienne
- 2001–2004: Grenoble Foot 38
- 2004–2006: Rouen
- 2006–2007: Al-Ahli Dubai
- 2007–2008: Baniyas Club
- 2008–2009: MC Alger
- 2010: Al Shamal
- 2010–2011: MC Alger
- 2011: MC Oran
- 2012–2013: JSM Bejaia
- 2013: MC Alger
- 2014: JS Saoura
- 2014–2016: CR Belouizdad
- 2016–2017: NA Hussein Dey
- 2018: MO Béjaïa
- 2019: MO Béjaïa

Alain Michel (born 30 August 1948) is a French football coach, amateur goalkeeper, assistant professor and current manager.

== Biography ==
Michel is an associate professor of history and geography and is also an amateur association football goalkeeper for Beaugency, Blois and Orléans. He found work as a coach at Beaugency, Bourges, and Louhans-Cuiseaux, (where he met Christian Larièpe).

He was named coach of the Grenoble Foot 38 (GF38) at its inception in 1997. Under the leadership of Michel Destot and his team, the GF38 entered professional football in five years, advancing to the second division in four years and winning a title: National champion France in 2000-2001.

In the summer of 2001 Michel was approached by AS Saint-Étienne, who were seeking a replacement to Jean-Guy Wallemme. He returned to Grenoble within a few months, following the dismissal of Marc Westerloppe, and remained there until 2004, providing annual maintenance of the club in Division 2. In 2004, he was hired as athletic director by FC Rouen, and, at the end of the first season, he became coach following the sacking of Eric Dewilder.

In 2006, he left Normandy and went on Championship UAE, first working at Al-Ahli Dubai, and then Baniyas Club, where he was dismissed in March 2008. On 21 September 2008 he was appointed coach of Mouloudia Club of Algiers, and dean of Algerian football clubs, where his work as head of a youth team allowed his team to lead the Algeria national football championship in 2009-2010. However, he left the club in late 2009 and signed to the Qatari side Al Shamal.

After being coach of the Algerian national team, he made his return to his coaching duties for MC Alger for the 2010-2011 season, at the expense of François Bracci. In March 2011 he was sacked after his defeat in the championship against USM Blida.

On 4 January 2012, he became the coach of the JSM Bejaia in Algeria.

== Coaching successes ==
Bourges

- Promotion to Division 2: 1986, 1989

Louhans-Cuiseaux

- Promotion to Division 2: 1995

Grenoble

- Promotion to Division 3: 1999
- Promotion to Division 2: 2001
