= René Donoyan =

French footballer (1940–2021)

Personal information
- Date of birth: 8 April 1940
- Place of birth: La Ciotat, France
- Date of death: 30 October 2021 (aged 81)
- Height: 1.77 m (5 ft 10 in)
- Position: Goalkeeper

Youth career
- ?–1957: ES La Ciotat
- 1957–1959: Saint-Étienne B

Senior career*
| Years | Team | Apps | (Gls) |
| 1959–1964 | Saint-Étienne | 19 | (0) |
| 1964–1965 | → AS Cherbourg | 30 | (0) |
| 1965–1966 | → Sochaux | 21 | (0) |
| 1966–1967 | → AS Béziers | 28 | (0) |
| 1968–1970 | Lorient | 102 | (0) |
| 1970–1971 | Pays d'Aix | 30 | (0) |
| 1971–1972 | FC Bourges | 30 | (0) |
| 1972–1976 | Nantes | 23 | (0) |
| Total | | 283 | (0) |

Managerial career
- 1975–1976: Nantes II
- 1976–1977: FC Nantes C
- * Club domestic league appearances and goals

René Donoyan (8 April 1940 – 30 October 2021) was a French football player and manager. He played as a goalkeeper, notably for AS Saint-Étienne, FC Sochaux-Montbéliard, and FC Nantes. Throughout his career, he played 61 matches in Division 1, 222 matches in Division 2, and one match in the UEFA Cup.

== Honours ==
Saint-Étienne

- Division 1: 1963–64
- Division 2: 1962–63

Nantes

- Division 1: 1972–73
