= Marc Westerloppe =

French football manager, scout and former midfielder (born 1960)

Marc Westerloppe (born 14 June 1960) is a French football manager and scout, and former midfielder.

== Career ==
Westerloppe managed Le Mans FC from July 1997 to November 2000, spending all that time in Ligue 2. In 1998–99, the team reached the semi-finals of the Coupe de France, losing 4–3 after extra time away to CS Sedan Ardennes. He signed and gave a professional debut to Didier Drogba during his time at the club; after his sacking, Drogba's career momentarily declined under new manager Thierry Goudet.

Remaining in Ligue 2, Westerloppe led Grenoble Foot 38 for 16 games in the first half of the 2001–02 season, being sacked after seven games without a win.

Westerloppe was a scout for RC Lens for over a decade before moving to Paris Saint-Germain F.C. in 2013. In 2018, the website Football Leaks uploaded documents allegedly from Westerloppe, claiming that the club was recruiting too many black players. He was allegedly investigated by the club for this stance in 2014 and denied the accusations. In January 2019, Westerloppe was fined €5,000 by the Ligue de Football Professionnel for PSG's collection of data on race of recruits, which is illegal in France. The league concluded that the matter was negligent, but not discriminatory.

In January 2018, Westerloppe left PSG for Stade Rennais F.C. also of Ligue 1.
