= Japhet N'Doram =

Chadian footballer (born 1966)

Personal information
- Date of birth: 27 February 1966 (age 60)
- Place of birth: N'Djamena, Chad
- Height: 1.82 m (6 ft 0 in)
- Position: Striker

Youth career
- Tourbillon

Senior career*
Years	Team	Apps	(Gls)
1984–1988	Tourbillon		
1988–1990	Tonnerre Yaoundé	?	(33)
1990–1997	Nantes	192	(72)
1997–1998	Monaco	13	(1)

International career
1989–1997	Chad	36	(13)

Managerial career
- 2007: Nantes
- * Club domestic league appearances and goals

Japhet N'Doram (Arabic: يافث ندورام; born 27 February 1966) is a Chadian former professional footballer who played as a striker.

His 14-year senior career was mainly spent with Nantes, which he represented in several capacities. He was nicknamed The Wizard.

== Club career ==
Born in N'Djamena, N'Doram begun his career with local Tourbillon FC, then spent three seasons in Cameroon with Tonnerre Yaoundé, one of the biggest clubs in Africa. In 1990 the 24-year-old signed for FC Nantes in France, scoring two goals in 19 games in his first season in Ligue 1; his first professional contract arrived as Argentine Jorge Burruchaga was recovering from injury and accepted to be given an amateur licence on behalf of his teammate.

N'Doram became something of a cult hero at Stade de la Beaujoire, scoring important goals as the club's 2000th in the top division, through a penalty against Lille OSC (1–0 win) or the second in a 3–2 home triumph against Juventus FC in the 1995–96 UEFA Champions League semi-finals (3–4 aggregate loss). In 1994–95, he netted 12 goals as Les Canaris won their seventh national championship – the first in 12 years – bettering to a career-best 21 in the 1996–97 campaign (second-best in the competition).

Aged 31, N'Doram left Nantes and signed for fellow league side AS Monaco FC, winning the 1997 Trophée des Champions, but retired at the end of the season following a persistent injury sustained during a match against his former team. He then joined his last club's technical staff, working as a scout.

N'Doram returned to Nantes on 28 June 2005, replacing Robert Budzynski as director of football. In February 2007 he was appointed team manager, leaving his post in July as the season ended in relegation.

== Personal life ==
N'Doram holds Chadian and French nationalities. His son, Kévin, is also a footballer. He played for Monaco.

== Career statistics ==
Appearances and goals by club, season and competition
Club	Season	League			Cup		Continental		Total	
Club	Season	Division	Apps	Goals	Apps	Goals	Apps	Goals	Apps	Goals
Tourbillon	1984	Chad Premier League								
Tourbillon	1985	Chad Premier League								
Tourbillon	1986	Chad Premier League								
Tourbillon	1987	Chad Premier League								
Tourbillon	1988	Chad Premier League								
Tonnerre	1988	Elite One								
Tonnerre	1989	Elite One		15						15
Tonnerre	1990	Elite One	32	18					32	18
Nantes Atlantique	1990–91	French Division 1	19	2	3	1	0	0	22	3
Nantes Atlantique	1991–92	French Division 1	25	4	1	0	0	0	26	4
Nantes Atlantique	1992–93	French Division 1	31	10	5	0	0	0	36	10
Nantes Atlantique	1993–94	French Division 1	26	8	4	0	1	0	31	8
Nantes Atlantique	1994–95	French Division 1	32	12	1	1	8	3	41	16
Nantes Atlantique	1995–96	French Division 1	24	15	2	1	7	3	33	19
Nantes Atlantique	1996–97	French Division 1	35	21	0	0	0	0	35	21
Nantes Atlantique	Total		192	72	17	3	16	6	225	81
Monaco	1997–98	French Division 1	13	1	1	2	2	0	16	3
Career total			237	91	18	5	18	6	273	102

== Honours ==
Nantes Atlantique

- French Division 1: 1994–95

AS Monaco

- Trophée des Champions: 1997

Individual

- French Division 1 Foreign Player of the Year: 1994
- 1995 Ballon d'Or:nominated
