= Claude Makélélé =

French footballer and manager (born 1973)

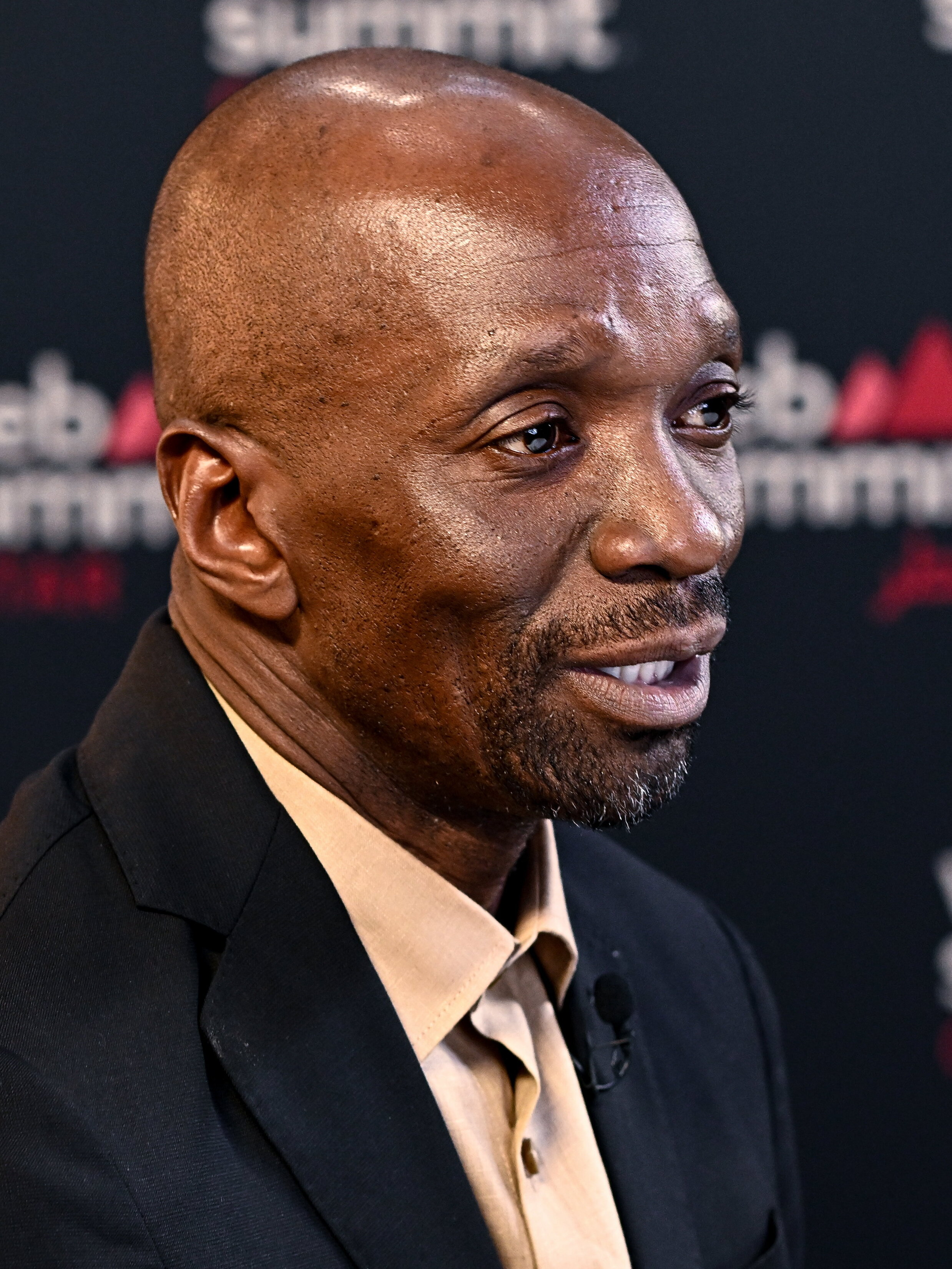
- Makélélé in 2024

Personal information
- Full name: Claude Makélélé Sinda
- Date of birth: 18 February 1973 (age 53)
- Place of birth: Kinshasa, Zaire
- Height: 1.74 m (5 ft 9 in)
- Position: Defensive midfielder

Youth career
- 1989–1990: Melun-Dammarie
- 1990–1991: Brest

Senior career*
Years	Team	Apps	(Gls)
1991–1997	Nantes	169	(9)
1997–1998	Marseille	32	(2)
1998–2000	Celta Vigo	70	(3)
2000–2003	Real Madrid	94	(1)
2003–2008	Chelsea	144	(2)
2008–2011	Paris Saint-Germain	98	(1)
Total		607	(18)

International career
1993–1994	France U21	7	(1)
1995–2008	France	71	(0)

Managerial career
- 2014: Bastia
- 2017–2019: Eupen
- 2024: Asteras Tripolis
Medal record
Men's football
Representing France
FIFA World Cup
Runner-up	2006
- * Club domestic league appearances and goals

Claude Makélélé Sinda (French pronunciation: [klod makele'le]; born 18 February 1973) is a French football manager and former professional player who played as a defensive midfielder. He last managed Super League Greece club Asteras Tripolis. Regarded as one of the greatest defensive midfielders of all time, Makélélé has been credited with redefining the defensive midfield role in English football, especially during the 2004–05 FA Premier League season, where he played a key role in helping Chelsea win the title with 95 points. In homage, the defensive midfield position is sometimes colloquially known as the "Makélélé Role".

In his playing career, which ended at Paris Saint-Germain, Makélélé also played for Nantes, Marseille, Celta Vigo, Real Madrid and Chelsea. He won league titles in France, Spain and England, as well as the 2001–02 UEFA Champions League during his time with Real Madrid. Furthermore, Makélélé was once selected in the FIFPRO Men's World 11 while playing for Chelsea.

Born in Zaire, Makélélé was a French international for 13 years and was part of the France national team which reached the final of the 2006 FIFA World Cup. He also represented his nation at the 2002 FIFA World Cup, two UEFA European Championships and the 1996 Summer Olympics.

After retiring from playing, Makélélé went into coaching and technical staff roles. He has been manager at Bastia, Eupen and Asteras Tripolis; assistant manager at Paris Saint-Germain and Swansea; a youth coach and technical mentor at Chelsea; and technical director at Monaco.

== Club career ==
=== Early career ===
Makélélé was born in Kinshasa, Zaire (now the Democratic Republic of the Congo). "Makélélé" means "noises" in Lingala, one of the languages spoken in the country. He moved to Savigny-le-Temple, a suburb of Paris in Seine-et-Marne, in 1977, when he was four years old. His father, André-Joseph Makélélé, was also a football player. He represented DR Congo, and ended his career in the third division of Belgium with Union Royale Namur.

At age 15, Makélélé signed for Sporting Melun-Dammarie 77. He played one year there, and left at the age of 16, when he joined the training centre of Brest-Armorique in Brittany. Despite maturing in Brest, but it was in the city of Nantes where he would sign a professional contract. Makélélé was recruited by Nantes in December 1991, when he was still 18 years old. Robert Budzynski, Nantes' sporting director, stated that once he had discovered Makélélé in Brest, he was sure he would become the new Emmanuel Petit.

At the beginning of the 1992–93 season, Makélélé was already in the Nantes first-team, then playing in the French first division. He played at Nantes for five seasons, winning the French championship in 1995 and helped the club to the semi-final of the UEFA Champions League the following season. This earned him a move to Marseille for whom he played for one season.

=== Celta Vigo ===
Makélélé was transferred to Celta Vigo where he spent two successful seasons at the Galician club. While playing alongside Aleksandr Mostovoi, Valeri Karpin, Haim Revivo and Míchel Salgado, Celta achieved historic victories such as 4–1 against Liverpool and 4–0 against Juventus in the UEFA Cup.

=== Real Madrid ===
…we knew that Zidane, Raúl, and Figo didn't track back, so we had to put a guy in front of the back four who would defend.

— Arrigo Sacchi describes Real Madrid's need for a holding midfielder.

In summer 2000, while Makélélé's former teammate at Nantes Christian Karembeu left Real Madrid for Middlesbrough, he was snapped up by the Spanish capital club. Makélélé's transfer was controversial, as Celta did not want to sell Makélélé unless a substantial improvement on their offer was made. Makélélé refused to train until there was resolution of his contract. Finally, Celta were reluctantly forced to sell him for €14 million, far less than their valuation of the player and only after a falsified police report was made by his agent, Marc Roger.

At Real, Makélélé added to his medal tally, winning two Spanish La Liga championships, the Champions League, the Supercopa de España, the UEFA Super Cup and the Intercontinental Cup. As an ever-present in Vicente del Bosque's Real Madrid side, Makélélé also established himself as one of the best defensive midfielders in the world.

Despite his value to the team, however, Makélélé was one of its most (relatively) under-paid members, earning a fraction of that paid to teammates like Zinedine Zidane, Luís Figo, Raúl, Ronaldo, Roberto Carlos, Steve McManaman, and Guti. In the summer of 2003, feeling that his position at the club was insecure after the shock dismissal of Del Bosque and the arrival of David Beckham, and encouraged by teammates Zidane, Raúl, McManaman and Fernando Morientes, Makélélé decided to ask for an improved contract. The Real management flatly refused to consider his request. Upset, Makélélé handed in a transfer request, whereupon he was signed by Chelsea. Club president Florentino Pérez poured scorn on Makélélé's footballing abilities and said that Makélélé would not be missed:

He wasn't a header of the ball and he rarely passed the ball more than three metres. Younger players will arrive who will cause Makélélé to be forgotten.

Pérez's opinion differed from that of players like Zidane, who remarked the following after Makélélé was sold and Beckham was bought:

Why put another layer of gold paint on the Bentley when you are losing the entire engine?

In his autobiography, published in 2006, McManaman described Makélélé as the most important and yet least appreciated midfielder at Real. Retired former Real Madrid player and captain Fernando Hierro also criticised Pérez for both Makélélé's departure and the manner of his departure, saying:

I think Claude has this kind of gift – he's been the best player in the team for years but people just don't notice him, don't notice what he does. But you ask anyone at Real Madrid during the years we were talking about and they will tell you he was the best player at Real. We all knew, the players all knew he was the most important. The loss of Makélélé was the beginning of the end for Los Galacticos. You can see that it was also the beginning of a new dawn for Chelsea. He was the base, the key and I think he is the same to Chelsea now.

=== Chelsea ===
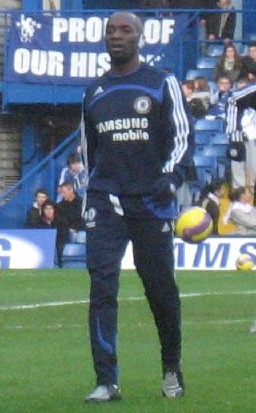
Makélélé in 2008

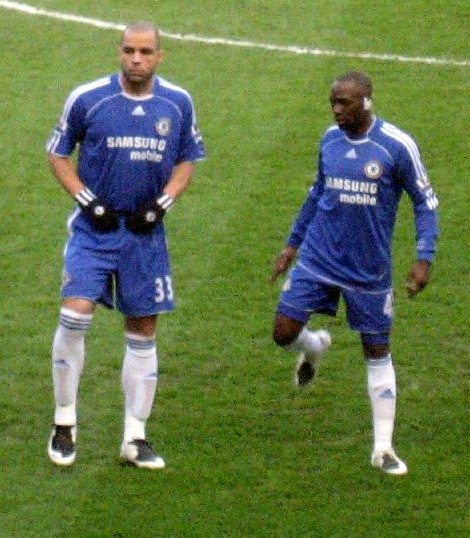
Makélélé (right) with Alex in 2008

In the summer of 2003, Makélélé signed for Chelsea for £16.8 million, where then manager Claudio Ranieri proclaimed that Makélélé would be the "battery" of the team.

==== 2003–04 ====
Chelsea finished second in the 2003–04 FA Premier League and were eliminated by Monaco in the semi-finals of the 2003–04 UEFA Champions League.

==== 2004–05 ====
Following the sacking of Ranieri and his succession by José Mourinho, Makélélé was a key player in Chelsea's successful 2004–05 season, winning both the FA Premier League and the League Cup. His defensive qualities allowed the likes of Frank Lampard, Joe Cole, Arjen Robben, Damien Duff, Eiður Guðjohnsen and Didier Drogba to parade their attacking skills. Makélélé's importance was recognised by Mourinho, who declared him Chelsea's "Player of the Year".

To cap off the 2004–05 season for the Frenchman, he was allowed to take a penalty awarded to Chelsea in the game against Charlton Athletic on the day the Premier League trophy was due to be presented. Charlton goalkeeper Stephan Andersen saved it, but Makélélé scored on the rebound. In September 2005, he was selected as a member of the World XI at the FIFPro awards. The team was chosen by a vote of professional footballers in 40 countries. He added to his sizeable medal haul the following season, winning both the FA Community Shield and the Premier League.

==== 2005–06 ====
In March 2006, Fulham defeated Chelsea 1–0 in a Premier League game in which Fulham manager Chris Coleman's tactics centered on bypassing Makélélé on the wings when Fulham had possession and putting midfielders on Makélélé when Chelsea were in possession. With Makélélé struggling to function effectively, Chelsea lost the game. Coleman later explained that Makélélé was more than a mere defensive midfielder; that he was actually Chelsea's deep-lying playmaker, and that Chelsea's attacks were channelled through him. Thus, denying him possession was instrumental in unravelling Chelsea. Mourinho was subsequently forced to counter this tactic by withdrawing Lampard and Michael Essien further back in midfield to relieve the pressure on Makélélé.

==== 2006–07 ====
On 5 November 2006, in a league encounter with Tottenham Hotspur, Makélélé scored his second goal for the club, a difficult curling volley from the edge of the 18-yard box which sped past goalkeeper Paul Robinson into the left-hand side of the goal to cue a bench-clearing celebration.

On 5 December 2006, in a League Cup game against Newcastle United, Makélélé wore the captain's armband in John Terry's absence and with Frank Lampard rested. Makélélé was substituted at half-time for Lampard. Makélélé also wore the captain's armband the following season, when Terry, Lampard, and Michael Ballack were all unavailable.

==== 2007–08 ====
The 2007–08 season was a period of renaissance for the 35-year-old Makélélé, as he played in the majority of Chelsea's fixtures. Despite an ear infection that made him miss an early part of the season, he regained his place and forced Michael Essien into the right-back position, effectively pushing Juliano Belletti out of the team. Makélélé was instrumental in Chelsea's run to the 2008 UEFA Champions League Final under the guidance of manager Avram Grant; the team were defeated by Manchester United in a penalty-shootout, after a 1–1 deadlock following both regulation and extra time.

=== Paris Saint-Germain ===
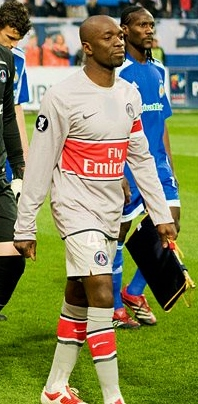
Makélélé with Paris Saint-Germain in 2009

On 18 July 2008, it was reported that Makélélé was about to take a medical the following day in Paris ahead of a proposed move back to French football. On 21 July, Chelsea announced they had released Makélélé on a free transfer, while Paris Saint-Germain confirmed that the player would join them and would be unveiled at a press conference that afternoon.

On 25 February 2010, he announced that he would retire at the end of the season, but in June, he retracted his statement and re-signed with PSG for an additional season. He won the Coupe de France with PSG at the end of the 2009–10 season. He later retired at the end of the campaign. The next season, he was appointed the assistant manager to Carlo Ancelotti, who had just joined PSG from Makélélé's previous club, Chelsea.

== International career ==
Makélélé was first capped for France in a match against Norway in July 1995, and went on to represent his country at the 1996 Summer Olympics.

Makélélé was not selected for France's 1998 World Cup and Euro 2000 successes, making his tournament debut at the 2002 World Cup, where he started the team's final Group A match against Denmark. Under Jacques Santini, Makélélé was a first-choice player in midfield at Euro 2004, starting in three of France's four matches.

Makélélé decided to retire from international football in September 2004 in order to focus on club football with Chelsea, but 11 months later, in August 2005, he and compatriots Zinedine Zidane and Lilian Thuram were persuaded out of retirement by national team manager Raymond Domenech, who coached Makélélé in the France U21 team over a decade prior, to help France qualify for the 2006 World Cup in Germany.

As a member of the France squad competing at the 2006 World Cup, Makélélé's performances as a tireless midfield spoiler were invaluable to France's progress to the final as they defeated Spain, the defending champions Brazil and Euro 2004 finalists Portugal in the knock-out rounds. His partnership with Patrick Vieira in the defensive midfield proved effective as the team conceded only three goals in seven games and took four clean-sheets, a tally only bested by world champions Italy.

After a defeat to Italy on penalties in the World Cup Final, Makélélé initially commented that he was again going to retire from international football. However, he was called up to the squad by Domenech for qualification matches for Euro 2008 against Georgia and Italy. On being asked about Makélélé being called up to his national squad despite being retired during an interview on Sky Sports, Chelsea manager José Mourinho accused the French manager of treating Makélélé like a slave and refusing to honour his retirement. Mourinho said Domenech "has been very objective – very objective – and said you have to play Georgia and you have to play Italy. Makélélé wants to retire but the national coach won't allow him to retire." FIFA confirmed that any club that refuses to release a player for national team duty is barred from using the player for two matches, a rule which is intended to discourage clubs from pretending that the player is injured. On the same evening as the Mourinho interview, Makélélé told French TV station TPS Star, "Even if my club doesn't agree, I will humbly honor the call."

Makélélé went on to continue playing with the France national team through the qualifications and then the finals for the Euro 2008 tournament, where France exited in the group stage after finishing bottom of their group. He and Thuram announced their retirement from international football on 17 June 2008, after France's 2–0 defeat to Italy.

== Style of play ==
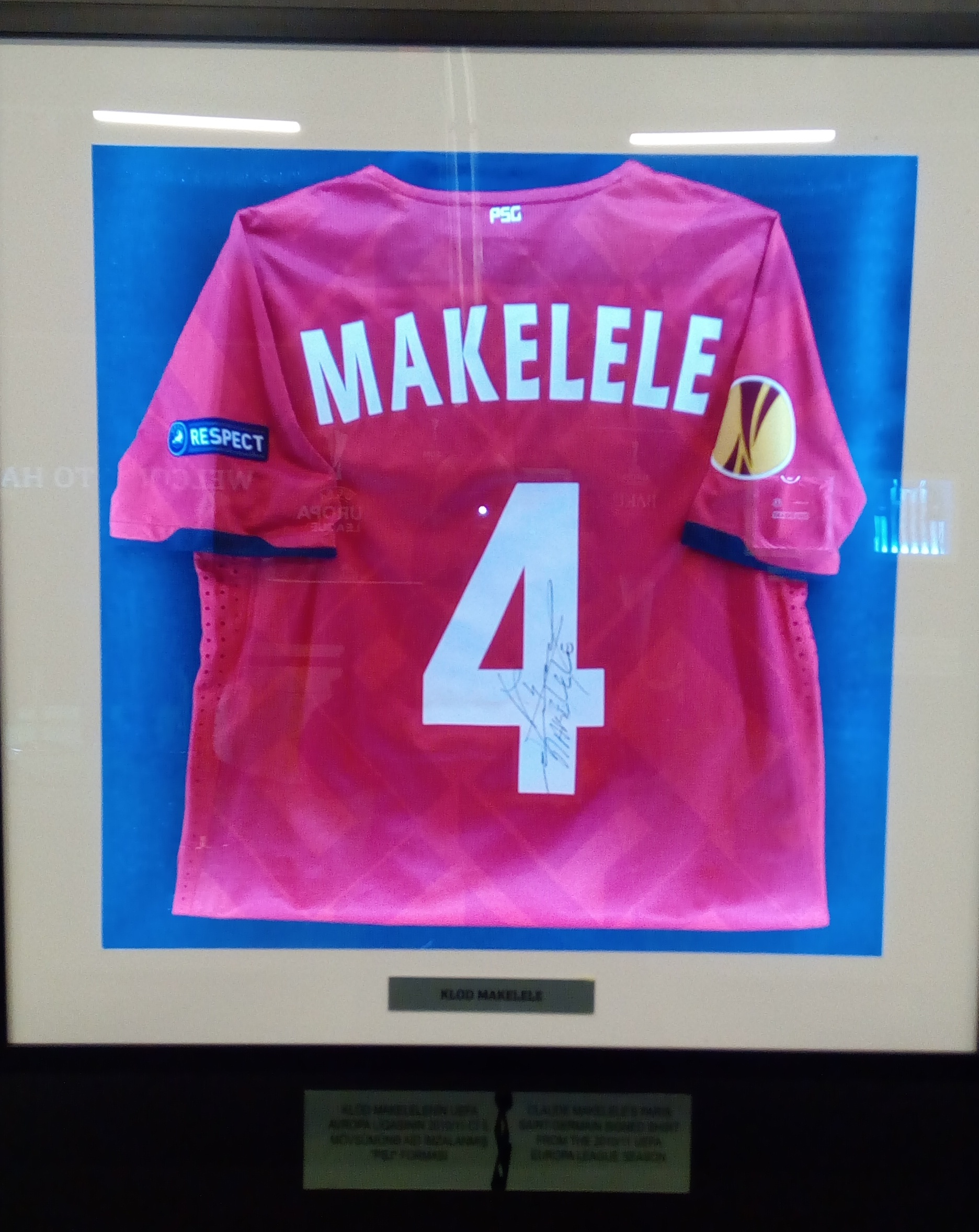
A shirt worn by Makélélé at PSG

Regarded as one of the best players ever in his position, Makélélé revolutionised the role of the defensive midfielder in the Premier League; as such, this position frequently came to be known colloquially as "the Makélélé role" in England. A combative and hard-working player, although he was capable of getting forward and playing in more advanced positions, he usually played in front of his team's back-line, where he mainly served as a defensive foil for his more offensive teammates, due to his aggressive tackling, as well as his ability to read the game, break down plays, mark and anticipate opponents, and time his challenges. In this role, he was known in particular for his acceleration, positional sense, tactical discipline, intelligence, energy, and ball-winning ability; although he was not the fastest, most talented, technically skilled player on the ball, or particularly good in the air, he was also highly regarded throughout his career for being capable of functioning as a deep-lying playmaker for his team, due to his ability to dictate the tempo of his team's play in midfield with his short, efficient passing game, which allowed him to link up the defence with the attack effectively after winning back possession. His physical strength in spite of his small stature, combined with his low centre of gravity, also gave him excellent balance on the ball in limited spaces, which allowed him to retain possession against more physical opponents. In addition to his defensive skills, Makélélé was also known for his tenacity, awareness, consistency, and strong mentality. Jonathan Wilson, when writing for The Guardian in 2013, labelled Makélélé as a type of holding midfielder he described as a "destroyer" - a player who is primarily tasked with running, winning back possession, and distributing the ball to other players.

== Managerial career ==
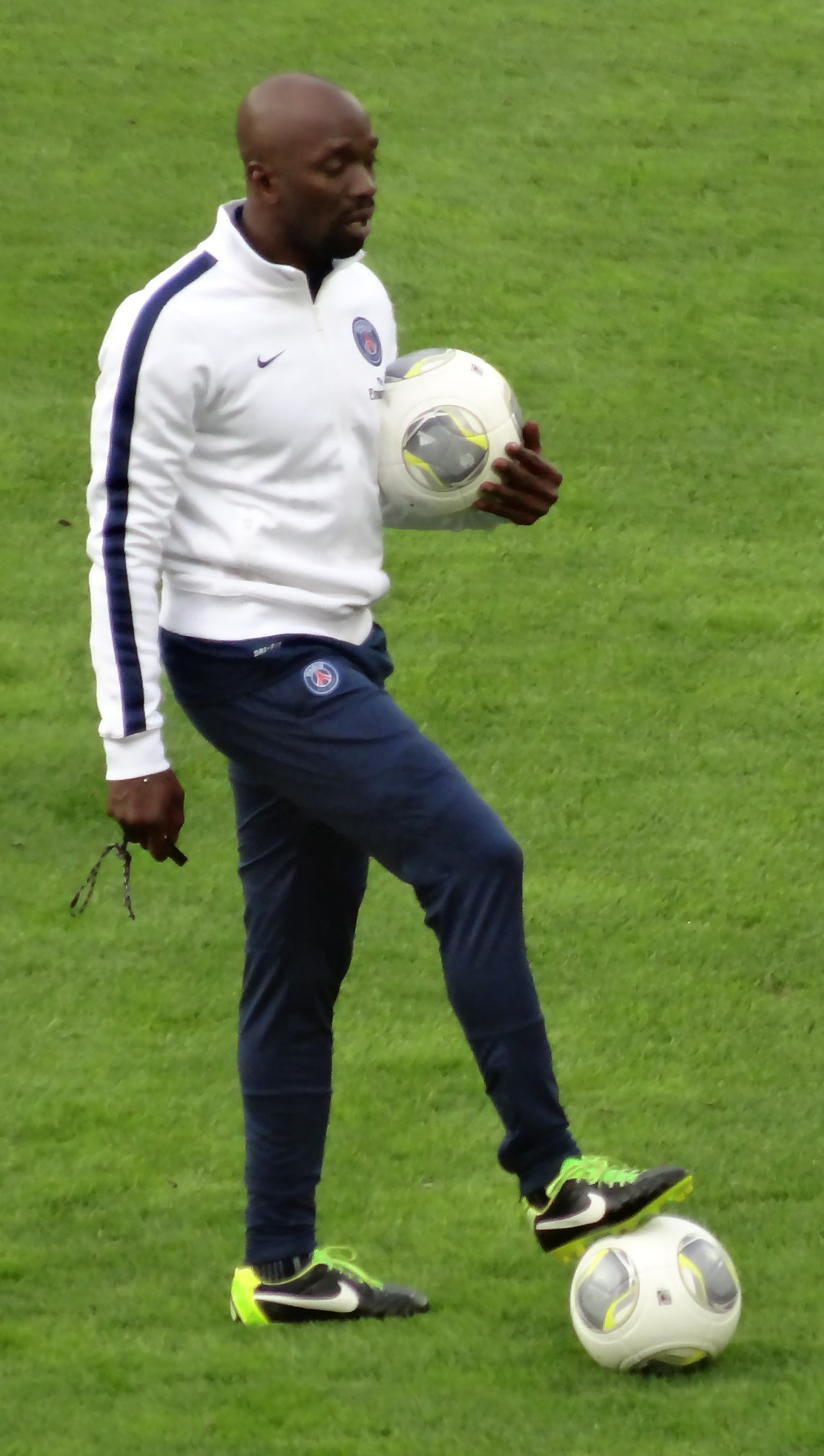
Makélélé in 2013, in his coaching role at Paris Saint-Germain

Makélélé became head coach of Bastia on 24 May 2014. After less than six months in charge, however, he was dismissed on 3 November 2014 following a 1–0 defeat to Guingamp on 1 November, due to his inability to make an impact on the club as coach. Prior to Bastia, Makélélé was an assistant coach at Paris Saint-Germain alongside Paul Clement. In January 2016, Monaco appointed Makélélé as technical director. Makélélé joined Clement as his assistant coach at Premier League club Swansea City in January 2017. Makélélé then joined Belgian side Eupen as their head coach in November 2017. He left Eupen in August 2019 after almost two full seasons as head coach to return to his former club Chelsea as a youth coach and technical mentor.

In September 2023, Makélélé left his coaching role at Chelsea by mutual decision. He was appointed head coach of Greece's club Asteras Tripolis on 14 September 2024. Caretaker manager Savvas Pantelidis had coached the team in a 1–3 loss against Atromitos the day after Makélélé's appointment, with the latter watching from the stands. In a surprise announcement, Makélélé left the club after three weeks and as many games, allegedly over board interference in his squad selections and tactics. He was unbeaten in his games in charge. Pantelidis would eventually succeed him as manager three days later.

== Personal life ==
In the spring of 2004, Makélélé began dating French model Noémie Lenoir. Lenoir gave birth to a boy, Kelyan (born 24 January 2005). The couple split in early 2009. Despite widespread reports that Lenoir was married to Makélélé, she wrote a blog in 2009 clarifying their former relationship, saying, "I'm not and have never been married. I do have a son. I have a wonderful baby's father and have a great relationship with him, however I've been single for some time now."

In May 2010, Lenoir attempted to commit suicide outside Makélélé's Paris home by ingesting a lethal amount of drugs and alcohol. Lenoir has had a long battle with substance abuse and later checked into rehab.

Claude has a son named Kaïys born in 2010. Kaïys Makelele who was previously with Juventus in Los Angeles, is currently playing football in Barcelona.

== Career statistics ==
=== Club ===
Appearances and goals by club, season and competition
Club	Season	League			National cup (Note: Includes Coupe de France, Copa del Rey, FA Cup)		League cup (Note: Includes Coupe de la Ligue, Football League Cup)		Europe		Other		Total	
Club	Season	Division	Apps	Goals	Apps	Goals	Apps	Goals	Apps	Goals	Apps	Goals	Apps	Goals
Nantes	1992–93	Division 1	34	1	6	0	—		—		—		40	1
Nantes	1993–94	Division 1	30	0	4	1	—		2 (Note: Appearances in UEFA Cup)	0	—		36	1
Nantes	1994–95	Division 1	36	3	2	0	1	1	8	1	—		47	5
Nantes	1995–96	Division 1	33	0	1	0	1	0	9 (Note: Appearances in UEFA Champions League)	0	1 (Note: Appearance in Trophée des Champions)	0	45	0
Nantes	1996–97	Division 1	36	5	0	0	1	0	0	0	—		37	5
Nantes	Total		169	9	13	1	3	1	19	1	1	0	205	12
Marseille	1997–98	Division 1	32	2	2	0	2	1	—		—		36	3
Celta Vigo	1998–99	La Liga	36	2	1	0	—		7	0	—		44	2
Celta Vigo	1999–2000	La Liga	34	1	1	0	—		9	3	—		44	4
Celta Vigo	Total		70	3	0	0	0	0	16	3	0	0	88	6
Real Madrid	2000–01	La Liga	33	0	0	0	—		14	1	2 (Note: One appearance in UEFA Super Cup, one appearance in Intercontinental Cup)	0	49	1
Real Madrid	2001–02	La Liga	32	1	6	0	—		13	0	2 (Note: Appearance(s) in Supercopa de España)	0	53	1
Real Madrid	2002–03	La Liga	29	0	0	0	—		11	0	2	0	42	0
Real Madrid	2003–04	La Liga	—		—		—		—		1	0	1	0
Real Madrid	Total		94	1	1	0	0	0	38	1	7	0	145	2
Chelsea	2003–04	Premier League	30	0	3	0	2	0	11	0	—		46	0
Chelsea	2004–05	Premier League	36	1	0	0	4	0	10	0	—		50	1
Chelsea	2005–06	Premier League	31	0	3	0	0	0	6	0	1 (Note: Appearance in FA Community Shield)	0	41	0
Chelsea	2006–07	Premier League	29	1	2	0	6	0	9	0	—		46	1
Chelsea	2007–08	Premier League	18	0	1	0	2	0	13	0	—		34	0
Chelsea	Total		144	2	9	0	14	0	49	0	1	0	217	2
Paris Saint-Germain	2008–09	Ligue 1	34	0	1	0	0	0	5	0	—		40	0
Paris Saint-Germain	2009–10	Ligue 1	31	1	5	0	0	0	—		—		36	1
Paris Saint-Germain	2010–11	Ligue 1	33	0	3	0	2	0	3 (Note: Appearances in UEFA Europa League)	0	1	0	42	0
Paris Saint-Germain	Total		98	1	9	0	2	0	8	0	1	0	118	1
Career total			607	17	34	1	21	2	130	5	10	0	809	25

=== International ===
Appearances and goals by national team and year
National team	Year	Apps	Goals
France	1995	1	0
France	1997	1	0
France	1998	1	0
France	2000	3	0
France	2001	6	0
France	2002	9	0
France	2003	6	0
France	2004	8	0
France	2005	5	0
France	2006	14	0
France	2007	11	0
France	2008	6	0
Total		71	0

== Managerial statistics ==
As of 7 October 2024

Managerial record by team and tenure
Team	From	To	Record					Ref.
Team	From	To	P	W	D	L	Win %	Ref.
Bastia	24 May 2014	3 November 2014	13	3	4	6	23.1	
Eupen	6 November 2017	30 June 2019	70	21	11	38	30.0	
Asteras Tripolis	13 September 2024	7 October 2024	3	1	2	0	33.3	
Total			86	25	17	44	29.1	

== Honours ==
=== Player ===
Nantes

- Division 1: 1994–95

Real Madrid

- La Liga: 2000–01, 2002–03
- Supercopa de España: 2001, 2003
- UEFA Champions League: 2001–02
- UEFA Super Cup: 2002
- Intercontinental Cup: 2002

Chelsea

- Premier League: 2004–05, 2005–06
- FA Cup: 2006–07
- Football League Cup: 2004–05, 2006–07
- FA Community Shield: 2005
- UEFA Champions League runner-up: 2007–08

Paris Saint-Germain

- Coupe de France: 2009–10

France

- FIFA World Cup runner-up: 2006

Individual

- FIFPro World XI: 2005
- Chelsea Players' Player of the Year: 2006
- ESPN World Team of the Decade: 2009
- UNFP Trophée d'Honneur: 2010
