= Vercauteren =

Vercauteren is a surname. Notable people with the surname include:

- Franky Vercauteren (born 1956), Belgian footballer
- Joseph Vercauteren, professor at the University of Pharmacy of Bordeaux, France
