= Jean-René Toumelin =

French sporting director (1942–2022)

- Born: 7 July 1942; Grand-Champ, France
- Died: 25 September 2022 (aged 80); Baden, France
- Occupation: Sporting director

Jean-René Toumelin (7 July 1942 – 25 September 2022) was a French sporting director.

== Biography ==
In 1996, Toumelin succeeded Guy Scherrer as President of Football Club de Nantes. While the club was emerging from a sporting crisis, he was replaced by Kléber Bobin in 1999. His presidency was marked by the sale of many players against his will.

== Death ==
He died in Baden, France, on 25 September 2022, at the age of 80.
