= Joël Henry (footballer) =

French footballer (1962–2026)

Personal information
- Date of birth: 19 April 1962
- Place of birth: Armentières, France
- Date of death: 29 March 2026 (aged 63)
- Place of death: La Tremblade, France
- Height: 1.77 m (5 ft 10 in)
- Position: Attacking midfielder

Senior career*
Years	Team	Apps	(Gls)
1978–1980	Lille	9	(2)
1980–1981	Bastia	26	(5)
1981–1983	Lille	47	(14)
1983–1986	Brest	84	(14)
1986–1987	Nice	33	(5)
1986–1987	Toulon Var	34	(4)
1988–1992	Nantes	113	(7)
1992–1993	Limoges Foot 87	0	(0)
Total		346	(51)

International career
1981–1984	France U21	3	(1)
- * Club domestic league appearances and goals

Joël Henry (19 April 1962 – 29 March 2026) was a French professional footballer who played as an attacking midfielder. He made 345 appearances and scored 51 goals in Ligue 1 for Lille, Bastia, Brest, Nice, Toulon and Nantes during the period of 1978 to 1992.

== Death ==
Henry died in La Tremblade on 29 March 2026, aged 63.
