= Jean-Claude Osman =

French footballer (born 1947)

Personal information
- Date of birth: March 6, 1947 (age 79)
- Place of birth: La Suze, France
- Position: Defender

Senior career*
Years	Team	Apps	(Gls)
1964–1978	Nantes		
1978–1979	Angers		

International career
1973	France	1	(0)
- * Club domestic league appearances and goals

Jean-Claude Osman (born March 6, 1947) is a French former professional footballer who played as a defender.
