= Ramon Muller =

Argentine footballer (1935–1986)

Ramón Muller
Personal information
- Date of birth: 16 April 1935
- Place of birth: Rosario, Argentina
- Date of death: 12 May 1986 (aged 51)
- Place of death: Nantes, France
- Height: 1.65 m (5 ft 5 in)
- Position: Striker

Senior career*
| Years | Team | Apps | (Gls) |
| 1959 | Newell's Old Boys | | |
| 1960–1962 | Sochaux | 40 | (11) |
| 1962–1963 | Strasbourg | 63 | (16) |
| 1963–1966 | Nantes | 73 | (15) |
| 1966–1968 | Strasbourg | 64 | (4) |
| 1968–1970 | Boulogne | 66 | (8) |
| 1970–1973 | Stade Briochin | | |

Managerial career
- 1969: Boulogne
- * Club domestic league appearances and goals

Ramón Muller (16 April 1935 – 12 May 1986) was an Argentine football striker who played in France with Sochaux, Strasbourg, Nantes, Boulogne and Stade Briochin. His son was Oscar Muller.
