= Christian Larièpe =

French footballer and manager (1959–2023)

Personal information
- Date of birth: 2 August 1959
- Place of birth: Montceau-les-Mines, France
- Date of death: 2 May 2023 (aged 63)
- Position: Defender

Senior career*
| Years | Team | Apps | (Gls) |
| 1978–1981 | FC Montceau Bourgogne | | |

Managerial career
- Louhans-Cuiseaux (assistant)
- 1991–2000: Saint-Étienne (assistant)
- 2000–2001: Lausanne-Sport (sporting director)
- 2001–2003: Saint-Étienne (sporting director)
- 2003–2007: Olympique de Marseille (trainer)
- 2007–2009: Nantes (sporting director)
- 2010–2012: FC Dynamo Moscow (trainer)
- 2013: ES Uzès Pont du Gard
- * Club domestic league appearances and goals

Christian Larièpe (2 August 1959 – 2 May 2023) was a French footballer and sporting director who played as a defender.

After his football career abruptly ended at the age of 21, he became a trainer, later taking roles as sporting director for many clubs, including Saint-Étienne, Olympique de Marseille, Nantes, and FC Dynamo Moscow.

== Biography ==
Born in Montceau-les-Mines on 2 August 1959, Larièpe played for FC Montceau Bourgogne until the age of 21, when he suffered a serious injury. Before arriving in Nantes, he coached the reserve team of Olympique de Marseille, but was replaced by Michel Flos due to insufficient results. Before Marseille, he was an assistant manager for Louhans-Cuiseaux FC and Saint-Étienne. He was sporting director for FC Lausanne-Sport from 2000 to 2001 before the club went bankrupt. He then returned to Saint-Étienne and served as sporting director until 2003.

Larièpe was interim coach of FC Nantes in the autumn of 2008 between the dismissal of Michel Der Zakarian and the arrival of Élie Baup. He was then a trainer for FC Dynamo Moscow from 2010 to 2013. In the autumn of 2013, he served as interim coach of ES Uzès Pont du Gard for three matches.

Christian Larièpe died on 2 May 2023, at the age of 63. He had contracted malaria after spending time in Cameroon.
