= Michel Pech =

French footballer (1946–2012)

Michel Pech (4 June 1946 – 20 September 2012) was a French footballer who played as a midfielder. Pech played for Joinville, Malakoff, Nantes, Avignon and Arles.
