= Daniel Eon =

French footballer (1939–2021)

Personal information
- Date of birth: 20 December 1939
- Place of birth: Saint-Nazaire, France
- Date of death: 15 March 2021 (aged 81)
- Position: Goalkeeper

Senior career*
Years	Team	Apps	(Gls)
1956–1968	Nantes		
1968–1975	RC Ancenis		
1975–1977	Stade Nazairien		

International career
1966–1967	France	3	(0)
- * Club domestic league appearances and goals

Daniel Eon (20 December 1939 – 15 March 2021) was a French footballer who represented the France national team. He played most of his career with FC Nantes.
