= Bruno Carotti =

French footballer (born 1972)

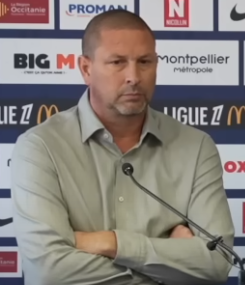
- Carotti in 2024

Personal information
- Date of birth: 30 September 1972 (age 54)
- Place of birth: Palma de Mallorca, Spain
- Height: 1.84 m (6 ft 0 in)
- Position: Defender

Team information
- Current team: Montpellier (sporting director)

Youth career
- 1991–1992: Montpellier

Senior career*
Years	Team	Apps	(Gls)
1992–1995	Montpellier	98	(6)
1995–1998	Nantes	89	(5)
1998–2000	PSG	20	(0)
2000	→ Saint-Étienne (loan)	10	(0)
2000–2001	Toulouse	28	(0)
2001–2009	Montpellier	225	(18)

International career
199?–1994	France U-21 / Olympic		

Managerial career
- 2011–: Montpellier (sporting director)
- * Club domestic league appearances and goals

Bruno Carotti (born 30 September 1972) is a retired French football player. He is currently the sporting director of Montpellier.

== Honours ==
Montpellier

- Coupe de la Ligue: 1991–92

Paris Saint-Germain

- Trophée des Champions: 1998
