= Christophe Le Roux =

French footballer (born 1969)

Personal information
- Date of birth: March 7, 1969 (age 57)
- Place of birth: Lorient, France
- Position: Midfielder

Senior career*
Years	Team	Apps	(Gls)
1987–1989	Lorient	48	(0)
1989–1994	Guingamp	104	(8)
1994–1996	Lorient	44	(9)
1996–1999	Nantes	81	(12)
1999–2002	Rennes	116	(24)
2002–2005	Guingamp	92	(12)
2005–2007	Vannes	68	(13)

International career
1998	Brittany	1	(0)
- * Club domestic league appearances and goals

Christophe Le Roux (born 7 March 1969) is a French former professional footballer.

He played his whole career in Brittany, with FC Lorient, En Avant Guingamp, FC Nantes Atlantique, Stade Rennais FC and Vannes OC.
