= Eddy Capron =

French footballer (born 1971)

Personal information
- Date of birth: 15 January 1971 (age 55)
- Place of birth: Saint-Pierre, Martinique, France
- Height: 1.85 m (6 ft 1 in)
- Position: Defender

Senior career*
| Years | Team | Apps | (Gls) |
| 1990–1997 | Nantes | 152 | (4) |
| 1997–1999 | Rennes | 28 | (1) |
| 1999–2003 | Sedan | 91 | (1) |
| 2003–2004 | Le Mans | 17 | (0) |
- * Club domestic league appearances and goals as of 15 August 2007

Eddy Capron (born 15 January 1971) is a retired French professional footballer who played as a defender.
