= Gilbert Le Chenadec =

French footballer (born 1938)

Personal information
- Date of birth: 13 July 1938 (age 88)
- Place of birth: Languidic, France
- Height: 1.76 m (5 ft 9 1/2 in)
- Position: Defender

Youth career
- US Montagnarde
- Lorient

Senior career*
Years	Team	Apps	(Gls)
1958–1967	Nantes	129	(7)
1967–1969	FC Metz	60	(3)
1969–1971	Angoulême	63	(2)
1971–1972	Paris-Joinville		

International career
1967	France	1	(0)
- * Club domestic league appearances and goals

Gilbert Le Chenadec (born 13 July 1938) is a retired French footballer who represented the France national football team.

== Club career ==
He played youth football at US Montagnarde and FC Lorient. He was then spotted by FC Nantes and won the French championship twice in 1965 and 1966. He ended his career with stints at FC Metz and AS Angoulême.
