= Bernard Gardon =

French footballer (born 1951)

Personal information
- Date of birth: 2 December 1951 (age 74)
- Place of birth: Clermont-Ferrand, France
- Height: 1.80 m (5 ft 11 in)
- Position: Defender

Senior career*
Years	Team	Apps	(Gls)
1969–1974	Nantes		
1974–1977	Lille		
1977–1980	Monaco		
1980–1982	Saint-Étienne		

International career
1973	France	1	(0)
- * Club domestic league appearances and goals

Bernard Gardon (born 2 December 1951) is a French former professional footballer who played as a defender. He obtained one cap for the France national team.

== Honours ==
Nantes

- Ligue 1: 1973

Monaco

- Ligue 1: 1978
- Coupe de France: 1980

Saint-Étienne

- Ligue 1: 1981
