= Gilles Rampillon =

French footballer (born 1953)

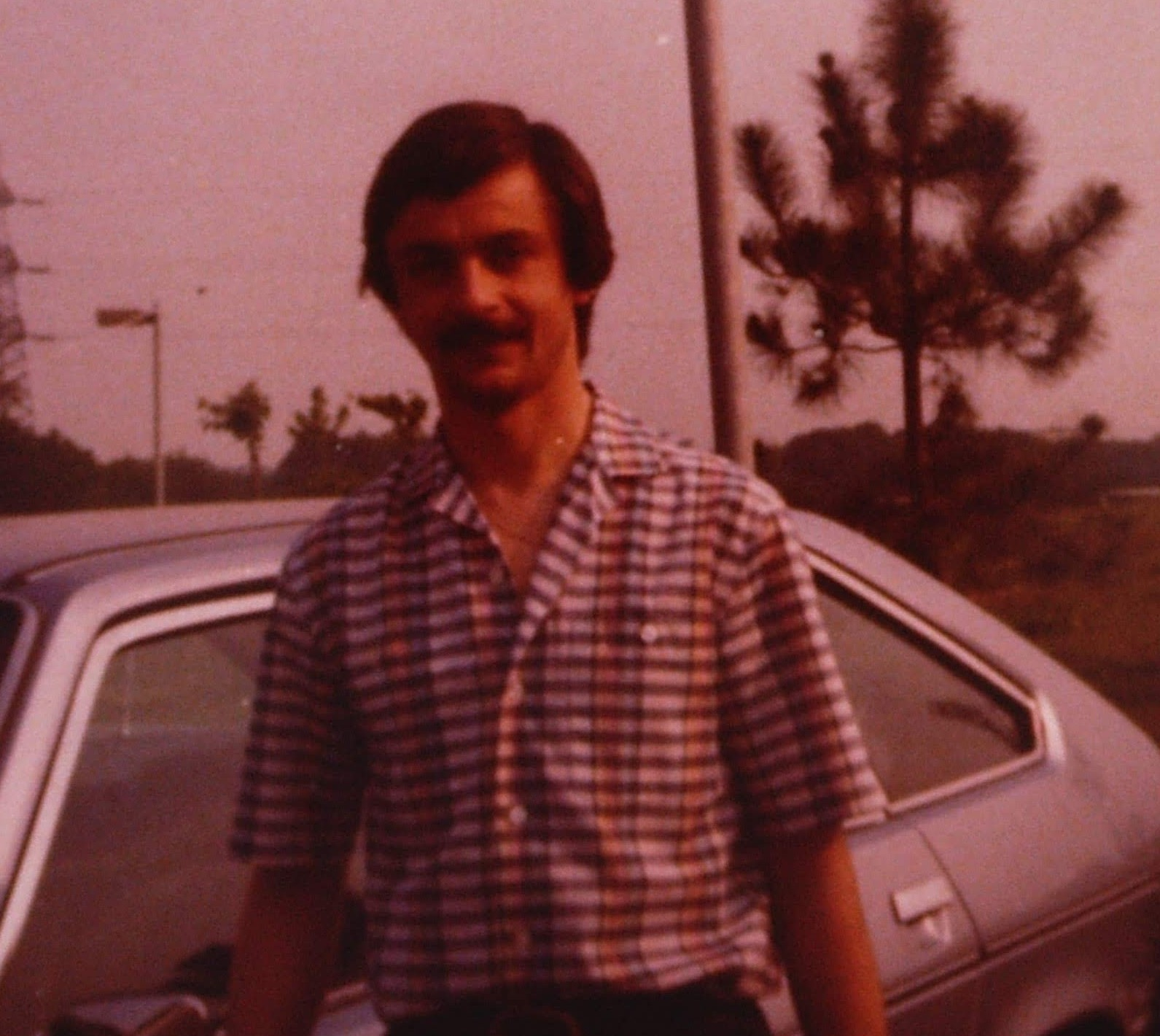

Personal information
- Full name: Gilles Rampillon
- Date of birth: July 28, 1953 (age 73)
- Place of birth: Nueil-les-Aubiers, France
- Position: Midfielder

Senior career*
Years	Team	Apps	(Gls)
1971–1982	FC Nantes		
1982–?	AS Cannes		

International career
1976–1980	France	3	(1)
- * Club domestic league appearances and goals

Gilles Rampillon (born 28 July 1953) is a French former professional footballer. He is a historic player of FC Nantes.
