= Gabriel De Michèle =

French footballer (born 1941)

Personal information
- Full name: Gabriel De Michèle
- Date of birth: 6 March 1941 (age 85)
- Place of birth: Saint-Étienne, France
- Position: Defender

Senior career*
| Years | Team | Apps | (Gls) |
| 1963–1975 | Nantes | 387 | (1) |

International career
| 1966–1967 | France | 2 | (0) |
- * Club domestic league appearances and goals

Gabriel De Michèle (born 6 March 1941) is a French former footballer who played as a defender. At club level, he spent his entire career with Nantes. At international level, he was part of France team that took part in the 1966 FIFA World Cup.

== Personal life ==
Born in France, De Michèle is of Italian descent.

== Honours ==
Nantes

- French championship: 1965, 1966, 1973
