= Serge Le Dizet =

French footballer and coach (born 1964)

Personal information
- Date of birth: 27 June 1964 (age 62)
- Place of birth: Douarnenez, France
- Position: Defender

Team information
- Current team: Caen (assistant)

Youth career
- 1971–1981: Stella Maris Douarnenez

Senior career*
| Years | Team | Apps | (Gls) |
| 1981–1982 | Quimper | | |
| 1982–1985 | Rennes | | |
| 1985–1987 | Quimper | | |
| 1987–1992 | Rennes | | |
| 1992–1998 | Nantes | | |

International career
| 1998 | Brittany | 1 | (0) |

Managerial career
- 1998–2002: Nantes U-18
- 2002–2003: Nantes youth academy
- 2003–2004: Nantes second team coach
- 2005–2006: Nantes
- Concarneau
- 2009–: Boulogne (assistant)
- * Club domestic league appearances and goals

Serge Le Dizet (born 27 June 1964) is a French football coach and former player who is an assistant manager at Ligue 2 club Caen.

He played his whole career in Brittany, with Quimper, Rennes and Nantes.

He also managed Concarneau.
