= Éric Decroix =

French footballer (born 1969)

Personal information
- Date of birth: 7 March 1969 (age 57)
- Place of birth: Croix, France
- Height: 1.85 m (6 ft 1 in)
- Position: Defender

Youth career
- 1986–1987: Roubaix Football
- 1987–1988: Lille

Senior career*
| Years | Team | Apps | (Gls) |
| 1988–1994 | Lille | 99 | (3) |
| 1994–1999 | Nantes | 149 | (4) |
| 1999 | Marseille | 3 | (0) |
| 1999–2002 | Montpellier | 15 | (0) |
| 2002–2003 | Beveren | 7 | (0) |
| Total | | 273 | (7) |
- * Club domestic league appearances and goals

Éric Decroix (born 7 March 1969) is a French former professional footballer who played as a defender.

== Honours ==
- Coupe de France: 1998–99
