= Jean-Claude Suaudeau =

French footballer and manager (born 1938)

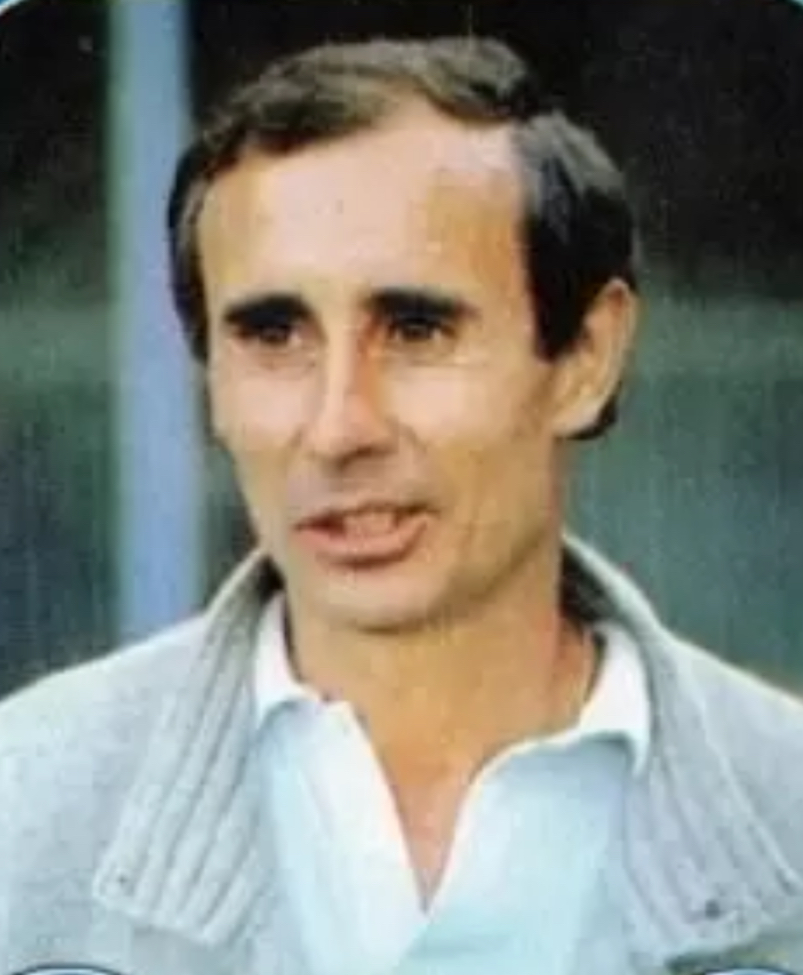

Personal information
- Full name: Jean-Claude Georges Suaudeau
- Date of birth: 24 May 1938 (age 88)
- Place of birth: Cholet, Maine-et-Loire, France
- Height: 1.65 m (5 ft 5 in)
- Position: Midfielder

Senior career*
| Years | Team | Apps | (Gls) |
| 1960–1969 | Nantes | | |

International career
| 1966–1967 | France | 4 | (0) |

Managerial career
- 1982–1988: Nantes
- 1991–1997: Nantes
- * Club domestic league appearances and goals

Jean-Claude Georges Suaudeau (born 24 May 1938) is a French former professional football manager and player.

He played as a midfielder with FC Nantes from 1963 to 1969 and then managed the youth teams from 1973 to 1982. From 1982 to 1988 and from 1991 to 1997 he coached the main team winning the championship twice in 1983 and 1995.

== Honours ==
=== Player ===
Nantes

- Division 1: 1964–65, 1965–66
- Coupe de la Ligue: 1964–65
- Challenge des Champions: 1965

=== Manager ===
Nantes

- Division 1: 1982–83, 1994–95

=== Orders ===
- Knight of the National Order of Merit: 1999
