= Jean-Michel Ferri =

French footballer (born 1969)

Personal information
- Date of birth: 7 February 1969 (age 57)
- Place of birth: Lyon, France
- Height: 1.85 m (6 ft 1 in)
- Positions: Defender; midfielder

Youth career
- Nantes

Senior career*
Years	Team	Apps	(Gls)
1987–1998	Nantes	288	(21)
1998	İstanbulspor	8	(1)
1998–1999	Liverpool	2	(0)
1999–2000	Sochaux	20	(2)

International career
1994–1995	France	5	(0)
- * Club domestic league appearances and goals

Jean-Michel Ferri (born 7 February 1969) is a French former professional footballer who played as a midfielder.

== Career ==
Ferri won the championship with Nantes in 1995. He joined Liverpool near the end of his career in 1998, but left after playing just 47 minutes for the club in two appearances as a substitute under manager Gérard Houllier.

== Honours ==
Nantes

- Division 1: 1994–95

France

- Kirin Cup: 1994
