= Robert Budzynski =

French footballer (1940–2023)

Personal information
- Date of birth: 21 May 1940
- Place of birth: Calonne-Ricouart, France
- Date of death: 17 July 2023 (aged 83)
- Position: Defender

Senior career*
Years	Team	Apps	(Gls)
1958–1963	Lens	134	(2)
1963–1968	Nantes	170	(2)
Total		304	(4)

International career
1965–1967	France	11	(0)

Managerial career
- 1970–2005: Nantes (Sport director)
- * Club domestic league appearances and goals

Robert Budzynski (21 May 1940 – 17 July 2023) was a French professional footballer who played as a defender. He notably played for France at the 1966 FIFA World Cup.

Budzynski was of Polish descent. He died on 17 July 2023, at the age of 83.
