= 1982–83 FC Nantes season =

Nantes
1982–83 season
- Chairman: Louis Fonteneau
- Manager: Jean-Claude Suaudeau
- Stadium: Stade Marcel-Saupin
- Division 1: 1st
- Coupe de France: Runners-up
- Top goalscorer: League: Vahid Halilhodžić (27 goals); All: Vahid Halilhodžić (32 goals)
- Highest home attendance: 25,000
- Lowest home attendance: 4,367
- Biggest win: 7–1 v. Baume-les-Dames (H) (12 March 1983)
- Biggest defeat: 2–3 v. Metz (A) (12 October 1982); 2–3 v. Paris Saint-Germain (A) (11 June 1983)

In the 1982–83 season, FC Nantes participated in Division 1, winning their sixth league title, but they lost to Paris Saint-Germain in the finals of the Coupe de France.

== Squad ==
Note: Flags indicate national team as defined under FIFA eligibility rules; some limited exceptions apply. Players may hold more than one non-FIFA nationality.

No.	Pos.	Nation	Player
—	GK	FRA	Jean-Paul Bertrand-Demanes
—	DF	FRA	William Ayache
—	DF	FRA	Michel Bibard
—	DF	FRA	Maxime Bossis
—	DF	FRA	Michel Der Zakarian
—	DF	FRA	Patrice Rio
—	DF	FRA	Thierry Tusseau
—	MF	FRA	Seth Adonkor
—	MF	FRA	Pierre Morice
—	MF	FRA	Oscar Muller
—	MF	FRA	Fabrice Poullain
—	FW	DEN	Henrik Agerbeck
—	FW	FRA	Loïc Amisse
—	FW	FRA	Bruno Baronchelli
—	FW	YUG	Vahid Halilhodžić
—	FW	FRA	Fabrice Picot
—	FW	FRA	José Touré

== Competitions ==
=== Overall record ===
Competition	First match	Last match	Starting round	Final position	Record							
Competition	First match	Last match	Starting round	Final position	Pld	W	D	L	GF	GA	GD	Win %
Division 1	10 August 1982	3 June 1983	Matchday 1	Winners	38	24	10	4	77	29	+48	63.16
Coupe de France	13 February 1983	1 June 1983	Round of 32	Runners-up	10	6	3	1	23	7	+16	60.00
Total					48	30	13	5	100	36	+64	62.50

=== Division 1 ===
==== League table ====
Pos	Team	Pld	W	D	L	GF	GA	GD	Pts	Qualification or relegation
1	Nantes (C)	38	24	10	4	77	29	+48	58	Qualification to European Cup first round
2	Bordeaux	38	20	8	10	67	48	+19	48	Qualification to UEFA Cup first round
3	Paris Saint-Germain	38	20	7	11	66	49	+17	47	Qualification to Cup Winners' Cup first round (Note: Paris Saint-Germain qualified for the 1983–84 European Cup Winners' Cup as winners of the 1982–83 Coupe de France.)
4	Lens	38	18	8	12	64	55	+9	44	Qualification to UEFA Cup first round
5	Laval	38	15	14	9	42	41	+1	44	Qualification to UEFA Cup first round

Source: Histoire du PSG
Rules for classification: 1) points; 2) goal difference; 3) number of goals scored.
Victory: 2 points, Draw: 1 point, Defeat: 0 points
(C) Champions

==== Matches ====
10 August 1982 1	Mulhouse	1-1	Nantes	Stade de l'Ill, Mulhouse
	Pfertzel 25'		Rio 23'	Attendance: 16,500; Referee: Alain Delmer

17 August 1982 2	Nantes	3-0	Bastia	Stade Marcel-Saupin, Nantes
	Halilhodžić 6'; Tusseau 66'; Amisse 69'			Attendance: 18,106; Referee: René López

24 August 1982 3	Bordeaux	1-2	Nantes	Stade du Parc Lescure, Bordeaux
	Müller 61' (pen.)		Amisse 19', 48'	Attendance: 27,419; Referee: Georges Konrath

27 August 1982 4	Nantes	5-1	Brest	Stade Marcel-Saupin, Nantes
	Tusseau 3'; Halilhodžić 14', 50'; Baronchelli 70', 74'		Bureau 53'	Attendance: 22,212; Referee: Mohamed Benali

3 September 1982 5	Paris Saint-Germain	2-1	Nantes	Parc des Princes, Paris
19:30	Kist 54'; Bathenay 90' (pen.)		Picot 78'	Attendance: 40,809; Referee: Daniel Lambert

10 September 1982 6	Nantes	1-0	Lyon	Stade Marcel-Saupin, Nantes
	Muller 68'			Attendance: 15,579; Referee: Michel Vautrot

21 September 1982 7	Laval	1-3	Nantes	Stade Francis Le Basser, Laval
	Þórðarson 20'		Halilhodžić 53', 74'; Touré 78'	Attendance: 18,000; Referee: Michel Dailly

24 September 1982 8	Nantes	3-0	Strasbourg	Stade Marcel-Saupin, Nantes
	Baronchelli 29', 90'; Muller 57' (pen.)			Attendance: 13,247; Referee: Jean-Marie Lartigot

2 October 1982 9	Toulouse	0-1	Nantes	Stadium de Toulouse, Toulouse
			Bossis 71'	Attendance: 29,000; Referee: Michel Dailly

12 October 1982 10	Nantes	2-3	Metz	Stade Marcel-Saupin, Nantes
	Touré 37'; Tucak 46' (o.g.)		Bernad 52'; Merry 54'; Bellus 60'	Attendance: 11,462; Referee: Jacques Ferrary

15 October 1982 11	Lille	0-2	Nantes	Stade Grimonprez-Jooris, Lille
			Baronchelli 27'; Poullain 40'	Attendance: 11,386; Referee: Gérard Biguet

27 October 1982 12	Nantes	1-0	Auxerre	Stade Marcel-Saupin, Nantes
	Poullain 69'			Attendance: 15,613; Referee: Claude Bouillet

29 October 1982 13	Sochaux-Montbéliard	1-1	Nantes	Stade Auguste-Bonal, Montbéliard
	Stopyra 54'		Touré 88'	Attendance: 7,000; Referee: Joël Quiniou

6 November 1982 14	Nantes	1-0	Rouen	Stade Marcel-Saupin, Nantes
	Halilhodžić 20'			Attendance: 14,253; Referee: Alain Delmer

16 November 1982 15	Tours	0-4	Nantes	Stade de la Vallée du Cher, Tours
			Amisse 28'; Muller 33'; Touré 81'; Halilhodžić 86'	Attendance: 12,275; Referee: Robert Wurtz

20 November 1982 16	Nantes	0-0	Monaco	Stade Marcel-Saupin, Nantes
				Attendance: 21,741; Referee: Michel Vautrot

4 December 1982 18	Nancy-Lorraine	2-2	Nantes	Stade Marcel-Picot, Tomblaine
	Philippe 30'; Zénier 56'		Baronchelli 14'; Picot 88'	Attendance: 10,897; Referee: Marcel Vautrot

11 December 1982 19	Nantes	5-1	Lens	Stade Marcel-Saupin, Nantes
	Touré 35'; Halilhodžić 47'; Picot 61'; Bossis 79'; Agerbeck 86'		Bossis 15' (o.g.)	Attendance: 16,318; Referee: Joël Quiniou

15 December 1982 17	Saint-Étienne	0-1	Nantes	Stade Geoffroy-Guichard, Saint-Étienne
			Halilhodžić 53'	Attendance: 17,021; Referee: Alain Delmer

18 December 1982 20	Bastia	1-1	Nantes	Stade Armand-Cesari, Furiani
	Ihily 48'		Halilhodžić 84'	Attendance: 3,255; Referee: Michel Dailly

15 January 1983 21	Nantes	4-0	Bordeaux	Stade Marcel-Saupin, Nantes
	Halilhodžić 18', 57' (pen.); Amisse 25', 48'			Attendance: 24,216; Referee: Gérard Biguet

22 January 1983 22	Brest	1-1	Nantes	Stade Francis-Le-Blé, Brest
	Bureau 46'		Halilhodžić 82'	Attendance: 19,000; Referee: Joël Quiniou

29 January 1983 23	Nantes	2-0	Paris Saint-Germain	Stade Marcel-Saupin, Nantes
	Poullain 17'; Touré 55'			Attendance: 20,292; Referee: Georges Konrath

6 February 1983 24	Lyon	1-2	Nantes	Stade de Gerland, Lyon
	Fournier 51'		Touré 7'; Halilhodžić 18'	Attendance: 11,574; Referee: Alain Delmer

19 February 1983 25	Nantes	0-0	Laval	Stade Marcel-Saupin, Nantes
				Attendance: 18,926; Referee: René López

27 February 1983 26	Strasbourg	2-0	Nantes	Stade de la Meinau, Strasbourg
	Mauffroy 28'; Gentes 73'			Attendance: 10,681; Referee: Claude Bouillet

9 March 1983 27	Nantes	3-0	Toulouse	Stade Marcel-Saupin, Nantes
	Adonkor 51'; Touré 76'; Halilhodžić 80'			Attendance: 15,000; Referee: Michel Dailly

19 March 1983 28	Metz	0-4	Nantes	Stade Saint-Symphorien, Metz
			Halilhodžić 17', 83'; Touré 35'; Amisse 76'	Attendance: 6,249; Referee: Alain Delmer

29 March 1983 29	Nantes	1-0	Lille	Stade Marcel-Saupin, Nantes
	Halilhodžić 39' (pen.)			Attendance: 12,288; Referee: Joël Quiniou

1 April 1983 30	Auxerre	1-1	Nantes	Stade Abbé-Deschamps, Auxerre
	Ferreri 23'		Touré 51'	Attendance: 12,737; Referee: Michel Girard

8 April 1983 31	Nantes	4-0	Sochaux-Montbéliard	Stade Marcel-Saupin, Nantes
	Amisse 12'; Touré 39', 57'; Halilhodžić 43' (pen.)			Attendance: 11,828; Referee: Jacques Ferrary

19 April 1983 32	Rouen	1-0	Nantes	Stade Robert Diochon, Le Petit-Quevilly
	Beltramini 12'			Attendance: 16,266; Referee: René López

29 April 1983 33	Nantes	2-1	Tours	Stade Marcel-Saupin, Nantes
	Halilhodžić 44', 56'		Polaniok 85' (pen.)	Attendance: 13,426; Referee: Jean-Louis Rideau

6 May 1983 34	Monaco	2-2	Nantes	Stade Louis II, Monaco
	Bijotat 33'; Ricort 55'		Touré 37'; Bossis 81'	Attendance: 5,456; Referee: Claude Bouillet

13 May 1983 35	Nantes	4-2	Saint-Étienne	Stade Marcel-Saupin, Nantes
	Poullain 11'; Rio 53'; Halilhodžić 68', 76'		Christensen 56'; Rep 82'	Attendance: 21,642; Referee: Gérard Biguet

20 May 1983 36	Nantes	3-1	Nancy-Lorraine	Stade Marcel-Saupin, Nantes
	Halilhodžić 25', 73'; Bossis 29'		Jeannol 89'	Attendance: 14,914; Referee: Michel Girard

24 May 1983 37	Lens	2-2	Nantes	Stade Bollaert, Lens
	Piette 9'; Brisson 62'		Baronchelli 29'; Halilhodžić 38'	Attendance: 26,913; Referee: René Lopez

3 June 1983 38	Nantes	2-1	Mulhouse	Stade Marcel-Saupin, Nantes
	Halilhodžić 30'; Bossis 73'		Jouanne 86'	Attendance: 18,695; Referee: Marcel Bacou

=== Coupe de France ===
==== Matches ====
12 February 1983 Round of 64	Melun	0-1	Nantes	Stade de la Faisanderie Fontainebleau, Melun
			Halilhodžić 68' (pen.)	Attendance: 6,581; Referee: Jacques Ferrary

5 March 1983 Round of 32	Baume-les-Dames	0-4	Nantes	Stade Léo Lagrange, Besançon
			Adonkor 29'; Baronchelli 41'; Halilhodžić 55', 75'	Attendance: 10,800; Referee: Gérard Biguet

12 March 1983 Round of 32	Nantes	7-1	Baume-les-Dames	Stade Marcel-Saupin, Nantes
	Touré 6', 46'; Picot 23', 76'; Agerbeck 30', 48', 49'		Sarremin 82'	Attendance: 4,367; Referee: Jean-Claude Boyer

5 April 1983 Round of 16	Bordeaux	0-0	Nantes	Stade du Parc Lescure, Bordeaux
				Attendance: 30,000; Referee: Robert Wurtz

15 April 1983 Round of 16	Nantes	4-0	Bordeaux	Stade Marcel-Saupin, Nantes
	Halilhodžić 25', 33'; Tusseau 84'; Bossis 89'			Attendance: 25,000; Referee: Mohamed Benali

3 May 1983 Quarter-final	RC Paris	2-2	Nantes	Stade Déjérine, Paris
	Bianchi 37'; Renaut 48' (pen.)		Amisse 54'; Picot 70'	Attendance: 30,000; Referee: Alain Delmer

10 May 1983 Quarter-final	Nantes	1-0	Racing Paris	Stade Marcel-Saupin, Nantes
	Picot 89'			Attendance: 11,896; Referee: Marcel Bacou

27 May 1983 Semi-final	Lille	0-1	Nantes	Stade Grimonprez-Jooris, Lille
			Amisse 24'	Attendance: 25,000; Referee: Robert Wurtz

7 June 1983 Semi-final	Nantes	1-1	Lille	Stade Marcel-Saupin, Nantes
	Amisse 69'		Marsiglia 73'	Attendance: 20,000; Referee: Georges Konrath

11 June 1983 Final	Paris Saint-Germain	3-2	Nantes	Parc des Princes, Paris
	Zaremba 3'; Sušić 65'; Toko 82'		Baronchelli 18'; Touré 41'	Attendance: 46,203; Referee: Michel Vautrot

== Statistics ==
=== Appearances and goals ===
No.	Pos	Nat	Player	Total		Division 1		Coupe de France	
No.	Pos	Nat	Player	Apps	Goals	Apps	Goals	Apps	Goals
	GK	(France) FRA	Jean-Paul Bertrand-Demanes	48	0	38	0	10	0
	DF	(France) FRA	William Ayache	43	0	35	0	8	0
	DF	(France) FRA	Michel Bibard	32	0	22	0	10	0
	DF	(France) FRA	Maxime Bossis	46	6	37	5	9	1
	DF	(France) FRA	Michel Der Zakarian	2	0	1	0	1	0
	DF	(France) FRA	Patrice Rio	46	2	36	2	10	0
	DF	(France) FRA	Thierry Tusseau	47	3	37	2	10	1
	MF	(France) FRA	Seth Adonkor	46	2	37	1	9	1
	MF	(France) FRA	Pierre Morice	7	0	4	0	3	0
	MF	(France) FRA	Oscar Muller	36	3	29	3	7	0
	MF	(France) FRA	Fabrice Poullain	27	4	21	4	6	0
	FW	(Denmark) DEN	Henrik Agerbeck	13	4	9	1	4	3
	FW	(France) FRA	Loïc Amisse	43	11	35	8	8	3
	FW	(Socialist Federal Republic of Yugoslavia) YUG	Vahid Halilhodžić	45	32	36	27	9	5
	FW	(France) FRA	Fabrice Picot	38	7	30	3	8	4
	FW	(France) FRA	José Touré	45	16	37	13	8	3
