= 1983 Coupe de France final =

- Event: 1982–83 Coupe de France
Paris Saint-Germain	Nantes
3	2
- Date: 11 June 1983
- Venue: Parc des Princes, Paris
- Referee: Michel Vautrot
- Attendance: 46,203

The 1983 Coupe de France final was a football match held at Parc des Princes, Paris on 11 June 1983. Paris Saint-Germain FC defeated FC Nantes 3–2 thanks to goals by Pascal Zaremba, Safet Sušić and Nabatingue Toko.

== Match details ==
11 June 1983

Paris Saint-Germain	3–2	Nantes
Zaremba 3'; Sušić 65'; Toko 82'		Baronchelli 17'; Touré 40'

Parc des Princes, Paris
Attendance: 46,203
Referee: Michel Vautrot

GK	1	(France) Dominique Baratelli
DF	2	(France) Franck Tanasi
DF	4	(France) Jean-Marc Pilorget
DF	5	(France) Dominique Bathenay (c)	(substituted off) 50'
DF	3	(France) Jean-Claude Lemoult
MF	6	(France) Pascal Zaremba
MF	8	(France) Luis Fernandez
MF	10	(Socialist Federal Republic of Yugoslavia) Safet Sušić
FW	7	(Chad) Nabatingue Toko
FW	9	(France) Dominique Rocheteau
FW	11	(France) Michel N'Gom
Substitutes:
MF	13	(Algeria) Mustapha Dahleb	(substituted on) 50'
FW	12	(Senegal) Saar Boubacar
Manager:
(France) Georges Peyroche Assistant Referees: Fourth Official:

GK	1	(France) Jean-Paul Bertrand-Demanes
DF	2	(France) Michel Bibard	(substituted off) 82'
DF	3	(France) William Ayache
DF	4	(France) Patrice Rio
DF	5	(France) Maxime Bossis (c)
MF	6	(France) Seth Adonkor
MF	8	(France) Thierry Tusseau	(substituted off) 73'
MF	10	(France) José Touré
FW	7	(France) Bruno Baronchelli
FW	9	(Socialist Federal Republic of Yugoslavia) Vahid Halilhodžić
FW	11	(France) Loïc Amisse
Substitutes:
MF	13	(Argentina) Oscar Muller	(substituted on) 73'
FW	12	(France) Fabrice Picot	(substituted on) 82'
Manager:
(France) Jean-Claude Suaudeau

== In popular culture ==
In the romantic comedy Le Fabuleux Destin d'Amélie Poulain, the title character avenges a trick by interfering with a man's viewing of this match on his television set. This sequence occurs approximately eight minutes into the film.

== See also ==
- Coupe de France 1982-83
