= List of FC Nantes seasons =

This is a list of the seasons played by FC Nantes, from their entry into the Championnat de France Division 2 in 1945 until the present day. The club's achievements in all major national and international competitions are listed.

Nantes has been very successful in domestic competitions, winning eight French top division titles. The club is also four-time winners of the Coupe de France and three-time winners of the Trophée des Champions, and won the Coupe de la Ligue in 1965. Since 1945, Nantes has spent 55 seasons in Ligue 1/Division 1, including 44 consecutive seasons between 1963 and 2007. The club has spent the remaining 23 seasons of their existence in Ligue 2/Division 2, having never been relegated below this level. They have been relegated only twice in their history, in 2007 and 2009.

A Nantes player has finished as top scorer in the top division on six occasions. These are listed in bold in the table below.

== FC Nantes (1945–92) ==
Season	Division	Pld	W	D	L	GF	GA	GD	Pts	Rank	Cup	LC	Other	Top Scorer(s)
1945–46	D2 Nord	26	11	4	11	47	43	4	26	5th				
1946–47	D2	42	16	13	13	66	70	−4	45	8th	R2			
1947–48	D2	38	16	6	16	79	81	−2	38	11th	R1			
1948–49	D2	36	13	12	11	58	53	5	38	9th	R2			
1949–50	D2	34	9	9	16	44	57	−13	27	17th	R2			
1950–51	D2	32	11	7	14	54	56	−2	29	10th				
1951–52	D2	34	17	8	9	61	57	4	42	4th	R1			
1952–53	D2	34	16	7	11	60	59	1	39	6th	R1	QF		
1953–54	D2	38	14	8	16	68	62	6	36	9th	R1	R1		
1954–55	D2	38	13	9	16	69	78	−9	35	10th	R1	R3		
1955–56	D2	38	10	10	18	54	84	−30	30	17th	R1	R1		
1956–57	D2	38	13	10	15	56	64	−8	36	13th	R2	R2		
1957–58	D2	42	13	11	18	53	65	−12	37	13th	R1	R1		
1958–59	D2	38	13	9	16	49	59	−10	35	14th		R1		
1959–60	D2	38	16	9	13	58	48	10	41	8th	R1	R1		
1960–61	D2	36	15	6	15	61	64	−3	36	11th	R1	R1		
1961–62	D2	36	16	8	12	43	43	0	40	6th	R1	R1		
1962–63	D2	36	25	4	7	82	38	44	54	2nd	R1	R1		
1963–64	D1	34	13	8	13	51	59	−8	34	8th	SF	QF		(France) Jacques Simon, 11
1964–65	D1	34	16	11	7	66	45	21	43	1st	R3	Drago – QF		(France) **Jacques Simon, 24**
1964–65	D1	34	16	11	7	66	45	21	43	1st	R3	Ligue – W		(France) **Jacques Simon, 24**
1965–66	D1	38	26	8	4	84	36	48	60	1st	RU		CdC – W	(France) **Philippe Gondet, 36**
1965–66	D1	38	26	8	4	84	36	48	60	1st	RU		EC – PR	(France) **Philippe Gondet, 36**
1966–67	D1	38	17	16	5	81	51	30	50	2nd	R3		CdC – RU	(France) Philippe Gondet, 14 (France) Francis Magny, 14
1966–67	D1	38	17	16	5	81	51	30	50	2nd	R3		EC – R2	(France) Philippe Gondet, 14 (France) Francis Magny, 14
1967–68	D1	38	15	11	12	55	50	5	41	7th	R3			(France) Jacques Simon, 12
1968–69	D1	34	13	6	15	44	45	−1	32	10th	R2			(France) Bernard Blanchet, 13
1969–70	D1	34	13	7	14	62	56	6	33	10th	RU			(France) Bernard Blanchet, 17
1970–71	D1	38	17	12	9	61	41	20	46	3rd	R3		ECWC – R2	(France) Bernard Blanchet, 15
1971–72	D1	38	17	9	12	70	48	22	43	7th	R2		UC – R2	(Argentina) Ángel Marcos, 20
1972–73	D1	38	23	9	6	67	31	36	55	1st	RU			(Argentina) Ángel Marcos, 11
1973–74	D1	38	19	9	10	63	41	22	58	2nd	QF		CdC – RU	(Argentina) Hugo Curioni, 14
1973–74	D1	38	19	9	10	63	41	22	58	2nd	QF		EC – R1	(Argentina) Hugo Curioni, 14
1974–75	D1	38	16	11	11	50	42	8	45	5th	R1		UC – R2	(Argentina) Hugo Curioni, 19
1975–76	D1	38	15	14	9	67	44	23	50	4th	R1			(France) Gilles Rampillon, 16
1976–77	D1	38	25	8	5	80	40	40	58	1st	SF			(France) Omar Sahnoun, 15
1977–78	D1	38	21	10	7	60	26	34	52	2nd	QF		EC – R2	(France) Éric Pécout, 14
1978–79	D1	38	23	8	7	85	33	52	54	2nd	W		UC – R1	(France) Éric Pécout, 22
1979–80	D1	38	26	5	7	76	30	46	57	1st	R2		ECWC – SF	(France) Éric Pécout, 13 (Argentina) Víctor Trossero, 13
1980–81	D1	38	22	11	5	74	36	38	55	2nd	R3		EC – R2	(France) Bruno Baronchelli, 11
1981–82	D1	38	19	5	14	64	34	30	43	6th	R1		UC – R1	(France) José Touré, 13
1982–83	D1	38	24	10	4	77	29	48	58	1st	RU			(Socialist Federal Republic of Yugoslavia) **Vahid Halilhodžić, 27**
1983–84	D1	38	18	9	11	46	32	14	45	6th	SF	Été – Grp	EC – R1	(Socialist Federal Republic of Yugoslavia) Vahid Halilhodžić, 13
1984–85	D1	38	23	9	6	61	32	29	55	2nd	QF			(Socialist Federal Republic of Yugoslavia) **Vahid Halilhodžić, 28**
1985–86	D1	38	20	13	5	53	27	26	53	2nd	R1	Été – Grp	UC – QF	(Socialist Federal Republic of Yugoslavia) Vahid Halilhodžić, 18
1986–87	D1	38	12	12	14	35	38	−3	36	12th	R1		UC – R1	(France) Philippe Anziani, 10
1987–88	D1	38	13	13	12	46	41	5	39	10th	R2			(Scotland) Mo Johnston, 13
In 1988–89, 3 points were awarded for a win as a one year experiment.
1988–89	D1	38	15	12	11	41	40	1	57	7th	R3			(Scotland) Mo Johnston, 9 (Senegal) Thierno Youm, 9
1989–90	D1	38	13	14	11	42	34	8	40	7th	R3			(Senegal) Thierno Youm, 7
1990–91	D1	38	9	16	13	34	44	−10	34	15th	QF			(France) Christophe Robert, 9
1991–92	D1	38	12	14	12	37	39	−2	38	9th	R1	Été – QF		(France) Nicolas Ouédec, 7

== FC Nantes Atlantique (1992–07) ==
Season	Division	Pld	W	D	L	GF	GA	GD	Pts	Rank	Cup	LC	Other	Top Scorer(s)
1992–93	D1	38	17	11	10	54	39	15	45	5th	RU			(France) Nicolas Ouédec, 13
1993–94	D1	38	17	11	10	47	32	15	45	5th	SF	Été – R1	UC – R1	(France) **Nicolas Ouédec, 20**
From 1994, 3 points were awarded for a win.
1994–95	D1	38	21	16	1	71	34	37	79	1st	R2	R3	UC – QF	(France) **Patrice Loko, 22**
1995–96	D1	38	14	13	11	44	42	2	55	7th	R2	R3	TdC – RU	(Chad) Japhet N'Doram, 15
1995–96	D1	38	14	13	11	44	42	2	55	7th	R2	R3	UCL – SF	(Chad) Japhet N'Doram, 15
1996–97	D1	38	16	16	6	61	32	29	64	3rd	R1	R3	UIC – SF	(Chad) Japhet N'Doram, 21
1997–98	D1	34	11	8	15	35	41	−6	41	11th	R2	R2	UC – R1	(France) Jocelyn Gourvennec, 12
1998–99	D1	34	12	12	10	40	34	6	48	7th	W	R2		(France) Olivier Monterrubio, 8
1999–2000	D1	34	12	7	15	39	40	−1	43	12th	W	R2	TdC – W	(France) Antoine Sibierski, 13
1999–2000	D1	34	12	7	15	39	40	−1	43	12th	W	R2	UC – R3	(France) Antoine Sibierski, 13
2000–01	D1	34	21	5	8	58	36	22	68	1st	SF	SF	TdC – RU	(France) Olivier Monterrubio, 12
2000–01	D1	34	21	5	8	58	36	22	68	1st	SF	SF	UC – R4	(France) Olivier Monterrubio, 12
2001–02	D1	34	12	7	15	35	41	−6	43	10th	R1	R3	TdC – W	(France) Marama Vahirua, 6
2001–02	D1	34	12	7	15	35	41	−6	43	10th	R1	R3	UCL – 2nd Grp	(France) Marama Vahirua, 6
2002–03	Ligue 1	38	16	8	14	37	39	−2	56	9th	R2	R2		(France) Marama Vahirua, 7
2003–04	Ligue 1	38	17	9	12	47	35	12	60	6th	SF	RU	UIC – SF	(Romania) Viorel Moldovan, 11
2004–05	Ligue 1	38	10	13	15	33	38	−5	43	17th	R3	R3	UIC – SF	(Mali) Mamadou Bagayoko, 7
2005–06	Ligue 1	38	11	12	15	37	41	−4	45	14th	SF	R3		(Mali) Mamadou Diallo, 10
2006–07	Ligue 1	38	7	13	18	29	49	−20	34	20th	SF	R3		(Mali) Mamadou Diallo, 4 (Romania) Claudiu Keșerü, 4 (France) Dimitri Payet, 4

== FC Nantes (2007–present) ==
Season	Division	Pld	W	D	L	GF	GA	GD	Pts	Rank	Cup	LC	Top Scorer(s)
2007–08	Ligue 2	38	19	13	6	58	34	24	70	2nd	R10	R3	(Mali) Mamadou Bagayoko, 10 (France) Nicolas Goussé, 10
2008–09	Ligue 1	38	9	10	19	33	54	−21	37	19th	R9	R3	(Mali) Mamadou Bagayoko, 7
2009–10	Ligue 2	38	12	9	17	43	54	−11	45	15th	R7	R1	(France) Stéphane Darbion, 6 (France) Jean-Claude Darcheville, 6 (Mali) Tenema N'Diaye, 6
2010–11	Ligue 2	38	11	14	13	38	40	−2	47	13th	R11	R1	(Serbia) Filip Đorđević, 12
2011–12	Ligue 2	38	14	9	15	51	42	9	51	9th	R8	R3	(France) Sylvain Wiltord, 8
2012–13	Ligue 2	38	19	12	7	54	29	25	69	3rd	R10	R1	(Serbia) Filip Đorđević, 20
2013–14	Ligue 1	38	12	10	16	38	43	−5	46	13th	R9	SF	(Serbia) Filip Đorđević, 9
2014–15	Ligue 1	38	11	12	15	29	40	−11	45	14th	R11	QF	(France) Jordan Veretout, 7
2015–16	Ligue 1	38	12	12	14	33	44	−11	48	14th	QF	R3	(Argentina) Emiliano Sala, 6
2016–17	Ligue 1	38	14	9	15	40	54	−14	51	7th	R10	QF	(Argentina) Emiliano Sala, 12
2017–18	Ligue 1	38	14	10	14	36	41	−5	52	9th	R10	R3	(Argentina) Emiliano Sala, 12
2018–19	Ligue 1	38	13	9	16	48	48	0	48	12th	SF	R4	(Argentina) Emiliano Sala, 12
2019–20	Ligue 1	28	11	4	13	28	31	−3	37	13th	R10	R4	(France) Ludovic Blas, 5 (Nigeria) Moses Simon, 5
2020–21	Ligue 1	38	9	13	16	47	55	−8	40	18th	R9		(France) Ludovic Blas, 10
2021–22	Ligue 1	38	15	10	13	55	48	7	55	9th	W		(France) Randal Kolo Muani, 12
2022–23	Ligue 1	38	7	15	16	37	55	−18	36	16th	RU		(Egypt) Mostafa Mohamed, 8
2023–24	Ligue 1	34	9	6	19	30	55	−25	33	14th	R10		(Egypt) Mostafa Mohamed, 8
2024–25	Ligue 1	34	8	12	14	39	52	−13	36	13th	R10		(France) Matthis Abline, 5
