= 2004–05 FC Nantes Atlantique season =

FC Nantes
2004–05 season
- Head coach: Loïc Amisse (until December); Serge Le Dizet (from December)
- Stadium: Stade de la Beaujoire
- Ligue 1: 17th
- Coupe de France: Round of 16
- Coupe de la Ligue: Round of 16
- Top goalscorer: League: Mamadou Bagayoko (7); All: Mamadou Bagayoko (8)

The 2004–05 season was the 63rd season in the existence of FC Nantes and the club's 43rd consecutive season in the top flight of French football. In addition to the domestic league, Nantes participated in this season's edition of the Coupe de France and the Coupe de la Ligue. The season covered the period from 1 July 2004 to 30 June 2005.

== Competitions ==
=== Overall record ===
Competition	First match	Last match	Starting round	Final position	Record							
Competition	First match	Last match	Starting round	Final position	Pld	W	D	L	GF	GA	GD	Win %
Ligue 1	7 August 2004	28 May 2005	Matchday 1	17th	38	10	13	15	33	38	−5	26.32
Coupe de France	8 January 2005	16 March 2005	Round of 64	Round of 16	3	2	0	1	7	3	+4	66.67
Coupe de la Ligue	10 November 2004	22 December 2004	Round of 32	Round of 16	2	1	0	1	3	3	+0	50.00
Total					43	13	13	17	43	44	−1	30.23

Source: Competitions

=== Ligue 1 ===
==== League table ====
Pos	Team	Pld	W	D	L	GF	GA	GD	Pts	Qualification or relegation
15	Bordeaux	38	8	20	10	37	41	−4	44	
16	Metz	38	10	14	14	33	45	−12	44	
17	Nantes	38	10	13	15	33	38	−5	43	
18	Caen (R)	38	10	12	16	36	60	−24	42	Relegation to Ligue 2
19	Bastia (R)	38	11	8	19	32	48	−16	41	Relegation to Ligue 2

Source: Ligue 1
Rules for classification: 1) points; 2) goal difference; 3) number of goals scored.
(R) Relegated

==== Results summary ====
Overall								Home						Away					
Pld	W	D	L	GF	GA	GD	Pts	W	D	L	GF	GA	GD	W	D	L	GF	GA	GD
38	10	13	15	33	38	−5	43	7	9	3	21	16	+5	3	4	12	12	22	−10

Source: Ligue 1

==== Results by round ====
Round	1	2	3	4	5	6	7	8	9	10	11	12	13	14	15	16	17	18	19	20	21	22	23	24	25	26	27	28	29	30	31	32	33	34	35	36	37	38
Ground	A	H	A	H	A	H	A	H	A	H	A	A	H	A	H	A	H	A	H	A	H	A	H	A	H	A	H	A	H	H	A	H	A	H	A	H	A	H
Result/	L	D	L	D	D	W	L	W	W	W	L	D	D	L	L	L	L	L	D	D	W	L	D	W	D	L	W	L	W	D	L	D	W	D	D	L	L	W
Position																																						

Source: Ligue 1
A = Away; H = Home; W = Win; D = Draw; L = Loss

==== Matches ====
7 August 2004 1	Metz	1–0	Nantes	Metz
CEST (UTC+2)				Stadium: Stade Saint-Symphorien

14 August 2004 2	Nantes	1–1	Bastia	Nantes
CEST (UTC+2)				Stadium: Stade de la Beaujoire

21 August 2004 3	Rennes	1–0	Nantes	Rennes
CEST (UTC+2)				Stadium: Stade de la Route de Lorient

28 August 2004 4	Nantes	2–2	Toulouse	Nantes
CEST (UTC+2)				Stadium: Stade de la Beaujoire

11 September 2004 5	Saint-Étienne	0–0	Nantes	Saint-Étienne
CEST (UTC+2)				Stadium: Stade Geoffroy-Guichard

18 September 2004 6	Nantes	1–0	Istres	Nantes
CEST (UTC+2)				Stadium: Stade de la Beaujoire

22 September 2004 7	Monaco	2–1	Nantes	Monaco
CEST (UTC+2)				Stadium: Stade Louis II

26 September 2004 8	Nantes	1–0	Lens	Nantes
CEST (UTC+2)				Stadium: Stade de la Beaujoire

2 October 2004 9	Strasbourg	0–2	Nantes	Strasbourg
CEST (UTC+2)				Stadium: Stade de la Meinau

16 October 2004 10	Nantes	1–0	Paris Saint-Germain	Nantes
CEST (UTC+2)				Stadium: Stade de la Beaujoire

23 October 2004 11	Caen	2–1	Nantes	Caen
CEST (UTC+2)				Stadium: Stade Michel d'Ornano

30 October 2004 12	Ajaccio	1–1	Nantes	Ajaccio
CEST (UTC+2)				Stadium: Stade François Coty

7 November 2004 13	Nantes	1–1	Auxerre	Nantes
CEST (UTC+2)				Stadium: Stade de la Beaujoire

13 November 2004 14	Lyon	2–0	Nantes	Lyon
CEST (UTC+2)				Stadium: Stade de Gerland

20 November 2004 15	Nantes	0–1	Bordeaux	Nantes
CEST (UTC+2)				Stadium: Stade de la Beaujoire

27 November 2004 16	Marseille	3–1	Nantes	Marseille
CEST (UTC+2)				Stadium: Stade Vélodrome

4 December 2004 17	Nantes	0–1	Nice	Nantes
CEST (UTC+2)				Stadium: Stade de la Beaujoire

11 December 2004 18	Lille	2–1	Nantes	Villeneuve-d'Ascq
CEST (UTC+2)				Stadium: Stadium Lille Métropole

19 December 2004 19	Nantes	2–2	Sochaux	Nantes
CEST (UTC+2)				Stadium: Stade de la Beaujoire

12 January 2005 20	Bastia	0–0	Nantes	Furiani
CEST (UTC+2)				Stadium: Stade Armand Cesari

15 January 2005 21	Nantes	2–0	Rennes	Nantes
CEST (UTC+2)				Stadium: Stade de la Beaujoire

22 January 2005 22	Toulouse	2–1	Nantes	Toulouse
CEST (UTC+2)				Stadium: Stadium de Toulouse

26 January 2005 23	Nantes	0–0	Saint-Étienne	Nantes
CEST (UTC+2)				Stadium: Stade de la Beaujoire

30 January 2005 24	Istres	0–1	Nantes	Fos-sur-Mer
CEST (UTC+2)				Stadium: Stade Parsemain

5 February 2005 25	Nantes	0–0	Monaco	Nantes
CEST (UTC+2)				Stadium: Stade de la Beaujoire

19 February 2005 26	Lens	2–0	Nantes	Lens
CEST (UTC+2)				Stadium: Stade Félix-Bollaert

26 February 2005 27	Nantes	2–1	Strasbourg	Nantes
CEST (UTC+2)				Stadium: Stade de la Beaujoire

5 March 2005 28	Paris Saint-Germain	1–0	Nantes	Paris
CEST (UTC+2)				Stadium: Parc des Princes

12 March 2005 29	Nantes	2–0	Caen	Nantes
CEST (UTC+2)				Stadium: Stade de la Beaujoire

19 March 2005 30	Nantes	0–0	Ajaccio	Nantes
CEST (UTC+2)				Stadium: Stade de la Beaujoire

2 April 2005 31	Auxerre	2–1	Nantes	Auxerre
CEST (UTC+2)				Stadium: Stade de l'Abbé Deschamps

9 April 2005 32	Nantes	2–2	Lyon	Nantes
CEST (UTC+2)				Stadium: Stade de la Beaujoire

16 April 2005 33	Bordeaux	0–2	Nantes	Bordeaux
CEST (UTC+2)				Stadium: Stade Chaban-Delmas

23 April 2005 34	Nantes	2–2	Marseille	Nantes
CEST (UTC+2)				Stadium: Stade de la Beaujoire

7 May 2005 35	Nice	0–0	Nantes	Nîmes
CEST (UTC+2)				Stadium: Stade des Costières

14 May 2005 36	Nantes	1–3	Lille	Nantes
CEST (UTC+2)				Stadium: Stade de la Beaujoire

21 May 2005 37	Sochaux	1–0	Nantes	Montbéliard
CEST (UTC+2)				Stadium: Stade Auguste Bonal

28 May 2005 38	Nantes	1–0	Metz	Nantes
CEST (UTC+2)				Stadium: Stade de la Beaujoire

=== Coupe de France ===
8 January 2005 Round of 64	Cournon-d'Auvergne	0–3	Nantes	Clermont-Ferrand
20:00 CET (UTC+1)				Stadium: Stade Gabriel Montpied; Attendance: 5,313

12 February 2005 Round of 32	Olympique Saumur	0–2	Nantes	Angers
20:00 CET (UTC+1)				Stadium: Stade Jean-Bouin; Attendance: 17,000

16 March 2005 Round of 16	US Boulogne	3–2	Nantes	Boulogne-sur-Mer
19:00 CET (UTC+1)				Stadium: Stade de la Libération; Attendance: 7,300

=== Coupe de la Ligue ===
10 November 2004 Round of 32	Nantes	2–1	Laval	Nantes
19:00 CET (UTC+1)				Stadium: Stade de la Beaujoire; Attendance: 19,648; Referee: Stéphane Lannoy

22 December 2004 Round of 16	Auxerre	2–1	Nantes	Auxerre
21:00 CET (UTC+1)				Stadium: Stade de l'Abbé Deschamps; Attendance: 8,000; Referee: Claude Colombo

== Statistics ==
=== Goalscorers ===
Rank	No.	Pos	Nat	Name	Ligue 1	Coupe de France	Coupe de la Ligue	Total
1	19	FW	(Mali)	Mamadou Bagayoko	7	1	0	8
2	15	MF	(France)	Nicolas Savinaud	6	1	0	7
3	13	FW	(Mali)	Mamadou Diallo	4	2	0	6
4	28	FW	(Romania)	Claudiu Keșerü	3	1	0	4
5	14	MF	(France)	Olivier Quint	3	0	0	3
6	9	FW	(Romania)	Florin Bratu	2	0	0	2
Totals					33	7	3	43
