= Pierre Morice =

French footballer (born 1962)

Personal information
- Date of birth: 25 March 1962 (age 64)
- Place of birth: Saint-Brieuc, France
- Height: 1.80 m (5 ft 11 in)
- Position: Midfielder

Senior career*
Years	Team	Apps	(Gls)
1980–1987	Nantes	142	(6)
1987–1990	Chamois Niortais	87	(19)
1988–1989	→ Saint-Étienne (loan)	21	(2)
1990–1991	Nice	9	(0)
1993	Tampa Bay Rowdies	22	(9)
1994–1995	Minnesota Thunder	18	(0)
Total		299	(36)
- * Club domestic league appearances and goals

Pierre Morice (born 25 March 1962) is a French former professional footballer who played as a midfielder.

== Career ==
Pierre played seven seasons for FC Nantes in the 1980s, where he was part of the French Division 1 winning team. He was also part of the Nantes squad that went on to the final rounds of the UEFA Cup (what is now the Champions League) where he scored the winning goal against Spartak Moscow in the round of 16.

He went onto play for Division 1 teams Chamois Niortais, AS Saint-Etienne, and OGC Nice before moving to the United States where he finished out his career in the USL with the Minnesota Thunder (now the Minnesota United FC).

== Personal life ==
His son, Max Morice, played one season of college soccer at Yale, before signing a professional contract with Ligue 1 club Rennes in August 2012.

== Honours ==
Nantes

- French Division 1: 1982–83
- Coupe de France runner-up: 1982–83
