= Seth Adonkor =

Footballer (1961–1984)

Personal information
- Date of birth: 30 October 1961
- Place of birth: Accra, Ghana
- Date of death: 18 November 1984 (aged 23)
- Place of death: France
- Height: 1.80 m (5 ft 11 in)
- Position: Midfielder

Youth career
- La Mellinet
- 1975–1981: Nantes

Senior career*
Years	Team	Apps	(Gls)
1981–1984	Nantes	113	(1)
- * Club domestic league appearances and goals

Seth Adonkor (30 October 1961 – 18 November 1984) was a professional footballer who played as a midfielder for Nantes. Born in Ghana, he held both French and Ghanaian citizenship.

== Early life ==
Born on 30 October 1961 in Ghana, Adonkor moved to France in his early youth, his father being a diplomat. He started playing football at La Mellinet, later joining Nantes.

Adonkor was the half-brother of Marcel Desailly, who went on to play for the France national team.

== Career ==
With Nantes, Adonkor won the 1982–83 French Division 1, missing only one match in the season. Managed by Jean-Claude Suaudeau, Nantes finished ten points ahead of second-placed Bordeaux at a time when wins earned two points instead of three. Adonkor also finished runner-up in the 1982–83 Coupe de France with Nantes, losing the final 3–2 against Paris Saint-Germain.

At the time of Adonkor's death Nantes led Bordeaux by one point in the 1983–84 edition of the French Division 1. During the season France national team manager Henri Michel considered calling up Adonkor.

A midfielder standing at 1.80 m, Adonkor was athletic and had good ball control.

== Death ==
Adonkor was killed in car accident on 18 November 1984 along with his teammate Jean-Michelle Labejof. The third footballer Sidi Kaba survived with serious injuries.

== Honours ==
Nantes

- Division 1: 1982–83
- Coupe de France runner-up: 1982–83
