= Henrik Agerbeck =

Danish footballer (born 1956)

Personal information
- Date of birth: 10 September 1956 (age 70)
- Place of birth: Frederiksberg, Denmark
- Height: 1.76 m (5 ft 9 in)
- Position: Striker

Senior career*
Years	Team	Apps	(Gls)
1972–1978	Kjøbenhavns Boldklub		
1978–1980	Hertha BSC	55	(12)
1980–1983	FC Nantes		
1983–1986	FC Sochaux-Montbéliard		
1986–1988	US Orléans		
1988–1990	USL Dunkerque		
1990–1993	Calais RUFC		
1993–1994	Stade Portelois		

International career
1978–1979	Denmark	4	(0)
- * Club domestic league appearances and goals

Henrik Herbert Agerbeck (born 10 September 1956) is a Danish former football player in the striker position. Besides Denmark, he played in Germany and France. He started his career with Kjøbenhavns Boldklub, with whom won the 1974 Danish 1st Division championship. He then played professionally with German club Hertha BSC and a number of clubs in French football, winning the 1982–83 French Division 1 championship with FC Nantes. He played four games for the Denmark national football team.

== Honours ==
- 1974 Danish 1st Division
- 1982–83 French Division 1
