= Maxime Bossis =

French footballer (born 1955)

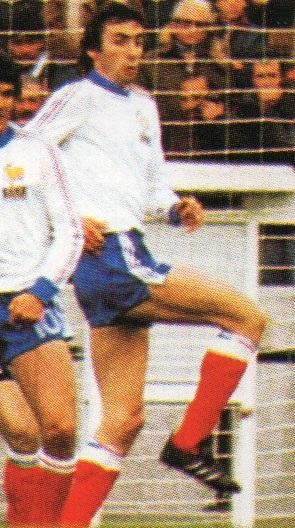
- Bossis playing for France at the 1978 FIFA World Cup

Personal information
- Full name: Maxime Jean Marcel Bossis
- Date of birth: 26 June 1955 (age 71)
- Place of birth: Saint-André-Treize-Voies, Vendée, France
- Height: 1.86 m (6 ft 1 in)
- Position: Defender

Youth career
- 1969–1970: Saint-André Sport
- 1970–1973: FC Yonnais

Senior career*
Years	Team	Apps	(Gls)
1973–1985	Nantes	379	(24)
1985–1989	RC Paris	120	(2)
1990–1991	Nantes	34	(0)
Total		533	(26)

International career
1976–1986	France	76	(1)

Managerial career
- 1996: Saint-Étienne
Medal record
Representing France
FIFA World Cup
Third place	1986
UEFA European Championship
Winner	1984
CONMEBOL–UEFA Cup of Champions
Winner	1985
- * Club domestic league appearances and goals

Maxime Jean Marcel Bossis (French pronunciation: [maksim ʒɑ̃ maʁsɛl bɔsis]; born 26 June 1955) is a French retired professional footballer who played as a defender.

Bossis spent most of his career playing for Nantes, a club he helped win three Ligue 1 titles and one Coupe de France. He obtained 76 caps (one goal) for the France national team, won UEFA Euro 1984, and played in two FIFA World Cup semi-finals.

== Early life and club career ==
Maxime Jean Marcel Bossis was born on 26 June 1955 in Saint-André-Treize-Voies, Vendée. A longtime starter for FC Nantes during the club's most successful period during the 1970s and 1980s, he was noted chiefly as a full-back on the left flank, but filled in at various roles in defence. Bossis spent much of his time at right back during Nantes' championship-winning seasons in 1977 and 1980, in which Thierry Tusseau normally started on the left, but made the left back position his own beginning in 1981. Bossis helped Nantes to finish first or second in every season between 1976 and 1981. The club added a third title in 1983, finishing ten points ahead of second-place Girondins Bordeaux. In 1985, Bossis moved to the ambitious RC Paris, but the Parisian club achieved only modest success in spite of heavy spending that acquired such players as Enzo Francescoli and Pierre Littbarski. Bossis returned to Nantes for one final season in 1990, lining up next to future French international Marcel Desailly before retiring from play.

Bossis was named Footballer of the Year by France Football in 1979 and 1981.

== International career ==
Bossis also represented the France national team for ten years, appearing at the 1978, 1982, and 1986 FIFA World Cups, reaching the semifinals of the latter two editions of the tournament. He is mostly remembered for missing France's last penalty in the 1982 World Cup semi-final against West Germany. While the score was tied at 4–4, Bossis missed the next penalty, allowing Horst Hrubesch to score the last penalty and send the Germans to the final. Bossis was also an important member of the France team that won UEFA Euro 1984 on home soil in 1984. From 1985 to 1992, he held the French record of caps, before fellow defender Manuel Amoros established a new mark with 82 caps. He also held the French record of matches played in the World Cup with 15, which was subsequently surpassed by Fabien Barthez in 2006.

== Personal life ==
Bossis' younger brother, Joël, also played professional football and holds the all-time record for most goals scored for Chamois Niortais.

== After retirement ==
After he retired in 1991, Bossis briefly embraced a career as a football executive, heading the Coupe de France Central Commission (1993–1995) before he joined Saint-Étienne as sporting director (1996–1997). He then reinvented himself as a TV commentator, working first for TPS, then for Orange Sport and since 2014 for BeIn Sport.

== Honours ==
Nantes

- Division 1: 1976–77, 1979–80, 1982–83
- Coupe de France: 1978–79

France

- UEFA European Championship: 1984
- Artemio Franchi Trophy: 1985
- FIFA World Cup third place: 1986; fourth place: 1982

Individual

- French Player of the Year: 1979, 1981
- Onze Mondial: 1979, 1980, 1981, 1983, 1984, 1985
- World XI:1984, 1986
