= Louis Fonteneau =

Louis Fonteneau (1907 – 29 January 1989) was a French sports administrator. He served as the president of FC Nantes from 1969 to 1986.

Under his presidency, the club won the French Championship four times (1973, 1977, 1980, and 1983) and the Coupe de France once (1979).

The largest stadium of Nantes, stade de la Beaujoire—Louis Fonteneau, was named after him in 1989.
