= Safet Sušić =

Bosnian football manager (born 1955)

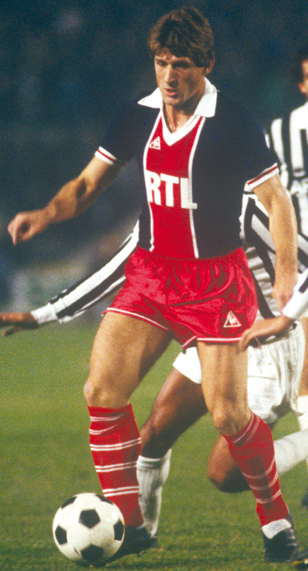
- Sušić with Paris Saint-Germain in 1983

Personal information
- Date of birth: 13 April 1955 (age 71)
- Place of birth: Zavidovići, PR Bosnia and Herzegovina, FPR Yugoslavia
- Height: 1.74 m (5 ft 9 in)
- Positions: Attacking midfielder; second striker

Youth career
- 1971–1972: Krivaja
- 1972–1973: Sarajevo

Senior career*
Years	Team	Apps	(Gls)
1973–1982	Sarajevo	221	(86)
1982–1991	Paris Saint-Germain	344	(85)
1991–1992	Red Star	17	(3)
Total		525	(155)

International career
1977–1990	Yugoslavia	54	(21)

Managerial career
- 1994–1995: Cannes
- 1996–1999: İstanbulspor
- 2001: Al Hilal
- 2004–2005: Konyaspor
- 2005–2006: Ankaragücü
- 2006–2007: Çaykur Rizespor
- 2007–2008: Çaykur Rizespor
- 2008: Ankaraspor
- 2009–2014: Bosnia and Herzegovina
- 2015–2016: Évian
- 2017: Alanyaspor
- 2018: Akhisarspor
- * Club domestic league appearances and goals

Safet "Pape" Sušić (pronounced [sǎfet sûʃitɕ]; born 13 April 1955) is a Bosnian former professional football manager and player. A gifted midfielder known for his dribbling skills and technical ability, he is strongly reputed to have been one of the finest European players of his generation. Sušić played for Yugoslavia in two FIFA World Cups, 1982 and 1990, and at UEFA Euro 1984. As a manager, he notably qualified the Bosnia and Herzegovina national team to the 2014 FIFA World Cup.

Sušić played as an attacking midfielder, often in a role of trequartista or fantasista (i.e. a creative playmaker) and rarely as a second striker for Sarajevo, Paris Saint-Germain and Red Star, and internationally for Yugoslavia. Later during his career, he was utilized more in a role of a deep-lying playmaker, both for club and national team. In 2010, France Football voted Sušić as Paris Saint-Germain's best player of all time and the best foreign player of Ligue 1 of all time, with his compatriot and friend who also had a spell with PSG, Vahid Halilhodžić, being voted seventh. As part of the UEFA Jubilee Awards in 2004, the Football Association of Bosnia and Herzegovina chose Sušić as the nation's greatest ever player.

Following his retirement from playing, Sušić started working as a manager. He worked for a number of club sides: Cannes, İstanbulspor, Al Hilal, Konyaspor, Ankaragücü, Çaykur Rizespor, Ankaraspor, Évian, Alanyaspor, Akhisarspor and the Bosnia and Herzegovina national team. After losing in the UEFA Euro 2012 qualifying play-offs, Sušić led Bosnia and Herzegovina to the top of their 2014 FIFA World Cup qualifying group, earning the country its first-ever World Cup appearance. He won his only trophy as manager with Akhisarspor, the 2018 Turkish Super Cup.

== Club career ==
=== Early career ===
Born in Zavidovići, FPR Yugoslavia, present-day Bosnia and Herzegovina, Sušić started playing football in the youth team of his hometown club Krivaja. In 1972, he joined the youth team of Sarajevo.

=== Sarajevo ===
Sušić made his senior debut for Sarajevo in 1973, one year after joining the youth team. During the 1979–80 season, he was the top scorer in the Yugoslav First League with 17 goals. In 1979, he was honoured as the Yugoslav Footballer of the Year, also being selected as the best athlete hailing from SR Bosnia and Herzegovina. In 1981, Sušić was awarded the Sixth April Award of Sarajevo.

=== Paris Saint-Germain ===
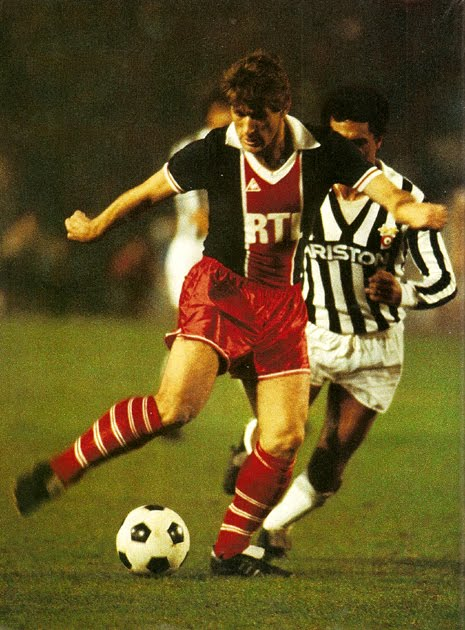
Sušić playing for Paris Saint-Germain against Juventus at the Stadio Olimpico Grande Torino, 2 November 1983

In December 1982, Sušić joined Paris Saint-Germain, where he became a star on the European stage. During his first season with the club, Sušić helped PSG to win the 1982–83 Coupe de France, scoring three goals over two legs in the semi-final against Tours, and once in 3–2 victory over Nantes in the final. The same year, he was nominated for the Ballon d'Or. During the 1985–86 season, Sušić scored ten goals as the Parisiens won their first ever national league title.

Overall, Sušić scored 85 goals and made a record 95 assists for PSG between 1982 and 1991. He is fifth in the club's all-time appearance list with 344 appearances, tied with Paul Le Guen. On 22 September 1984, in a 7–1 home drubbing of Bastia, he assisted on five of the side's goals. At 36, Sušić went to the second Paris-based club for a final year with Red Star.

On 5 February 2010, France Football chose Sušić as the best player in the history of Paris Saint-Germain, ahead of players such as Carlos Bianchi, Mustapha Dahleb, Ronaldinho, George Weah, Joël Bats, Raí and Luis Fernández.

=== Red Star ===
In his only season with Red Star, he played in Ligue 2, the second division of French Football. He played in 17 league games for the club in that season campaign, scoring 3 goals in the process. Shortly after leaving Red Star, Sušić announced his retirement from football in 1992.

== International career ==
During Sušić's playing career, Bosnia and Herzegovina was part of SFR Yugoslavia and thus he represented the Yugoslavia national team at international level.

Between 1977 and 1990, Sušić appeared 54 times for Yugoslavia, scoring 21 times. He debuted for his country in 1977 and scored his first goals for the team against Hungary in October of that year. A month later, he scored a hat-trick in a 6–4 victory against Romania during the 1978 FIFA World Cup qualification. However, this was Yugoslavia's only victory of their group and they failed to qualify for the tournament finals.

In June 1979, Sušić scored his second international hat-trick as Yugoslavia beat Italy 4–1 in a friendly match held in Zagreb. In September, he again scored three times in a 4–2 win over world champions Argentina.

Sušić was a member of the Yugoslav team that qualified for the 1982 FIFA World Cup, scoring once in a 5–0 win against Luxembourg.

Sušić was top scorer of Yugoslavia in qualification for UEFA Euro 1984. His two goals in a 3–2 win over Bulgaria in the final qualification fixture helped Yugoslavia to finish three points ahead of the Bulgarians and one point ahead of Wales and advance to the tournament finals. Yugoslavia ultimately finished bottom of their group in France, losing all three matches.

At the age of 35, Sušić made his second appearance at a World Cup finals as a member of Yugoslavia's squad for the 1990 FIFA World Cup in Italy. He scored his only World Cup goal in the team's 4–1 win against the United Arab Emirates during the group stage. He played 61 minutes before being substituted for Dejan Savićević in the penalty shootout loss to eventual runners-up Argentina at the quarter-final stage. His final international was a November 1990 European Championship qualification match away against Denmark.

In 2004, to celebrate UEFA's Jubilee, Sušić was selected as the Golden Player of Bosnia and Herzegovina by the Football Association of Bosnia and Herzegovina as their most outstanding player of the past 50 years.

His former international teammate Darko Pančev declared:

"It's well known how much I valued and still do value Safet Sušić. For me he's unsurpassable, the best Yugoslavia had. Probably one of the best in the world. I was often known to say that us other players should have to pay to play in the same team as Pape. At least I always talked and thought like that. Pape was a treasure for every forward. His crosses were unbelievable. Sometimes his ball would hit me without me even being aware of it. A wonderful player."

== Managerial career ==
=== Early career ===
Sušić first managed French club Cannes during the 1994–95 season and the beginning of the 1995–96. From 1996 until 1999, he managed İstanbulspor, then Al Hilal in 2001, Konyaspor from 2004 to 2005, Ankaragücü from 2005 until 2006, Çaykur Rizespor on two occasions, first in 2006 and the second time from 2007 to 2008. Sušić was then hired by Ankaraspor in March 2008. He left Ankaraspor in June 2008.

=== Bosnia and Herzegovina ===
==== UEFA Euro 2012 qualifying ====
On 28 December 2009, Sušić was named head coach of the Bosnia and Herzegovina national team. His debut was a friendly match against Ghana in Sarajevo. Bosnia and Herzegovina won the game 2–1 after goals from Vedad Ibišević and Miralem Pjanić. After only 2 wins in Sušić's 6 first matches in charge of the national team, including an important 2–0 loss against France in the UEFA Euro 2012 qualifying, Sušić came under a lot of criticism from several journalists and columnists who called for his head. Sušić recorded a 1–1 draw against France during a second game in Paris and ensured Bosnia and Herzegovina qualified for their second consecutive qualification play-off berth for UEFA Euro 2012 which was played against Portugal in November of that year.

==== 2014 FIFA World Cup ====
Sušić (right) with Bosnia and Herzegovina in a match against Iran at the 2014 FIFA World Cup

From August 2012 to August 2013, Sušić's Bosnia and Herzegovina side was on a nine-game unbeaten streak run. On 8 August 2013, the Bosnia and Herzegovina national team achieved their highest ever FIFA ranking, 13th place. On 15 October 2013, the country qualified for the 2014 FIFA World Cup in Brazil, their first major tournament in the country's history as an independent nation. Sušić's side fared well in their first World Cup match against Argentina despite losing 2–1. An unlucky own goal and some brilliance from football legend Lionel Messi saw them to a defeat. However, highs taken from the match were the good play the team demonstrated and the materialisation of their first World Cup goal scored by Vedad Ibišević. The team however controversially exited the competition at the group stage of the tournament after their second game against Nigeria having an equaliser scored by Edin Džeko wrongly disallowed for offside. This revitalised the calls for reformation of the FIFA governing body and the replacement of linesmen with technology so as to remove human error from lines decisions. Bosnia and Herzegovina won their last game in the competition against Iran with a healthy 3–1 victory which would've seen them through instead of Nigeria, who incidentally failed to defeat Iran, to a round of 16 match with France.

==== Contract extension and sacking ====
In July 2014, Sušić signed a two-year contract to continue as head coach, after he withdrew his resignation. On 17 November 2014, the Football Association of Bosnia and Herzegovina and Sušić parted ways after poor showing of the national team in the first four games of the UEFA Euro 2016 qualifying.

=== Évian ===
On 13 July 2015, Sušić was named manager of French Ligue 2 club Évian. On his debut he registered a draw. After the first four rounds, his new side registered four drawn games.

On 11 January 2016, Sušić was sacked by Évian due to a run of poor results at the club. After 20 rounds, the club was placed 13th on the table and were eliminated from the Coupe de la Ligue at the third round. He was replaced by Romain Revelli.

=== Alanyaspor ===
On 27 January 2017, Sušić signed a contract with Alanyaspor until June 2018. He was sacked on 25 December 2017 because of a string of poor results.

=== Akhisarspor ===
On 30 June 2018, Sušić was appointed manager of Turkish Cup winners Akhisarspor.

In August 2018, as cup winners, Akhisarspor participated in the Turkish Super Cup match against league champions Galatasaray. The result after full-time was 1–1, but Akhisar won 5–4 on penalties. This was Akhisar's second mayor trophy in the club's history and the first in Sušić's managerial career.

On 17 September 2018, after collecting two points in five games in the league, Sušić was sacked.

== Legacy ==
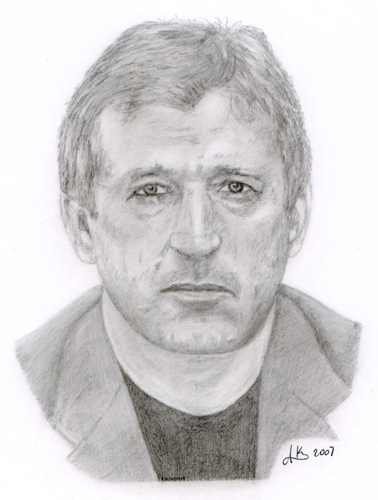
A portrait depicting Sušić

Safet Sušić Pape is a bestseller novel written by Bosnian novelist Zlatko Topčić, and published in 2007. Popular Sarajevo sketch comedy and variety TV series, Top lista nadrealista, also on occasion treated a subject of football and popular sportspeople in their program, with songs dedicated to Sušić and the Yugoslavia national football team under the management of another Sarajevan, Ivica Osim, being a prominent feature for a couple of episodes.

== Personal life ==
Sušić comes from a sporting family. Sead Sušić, a former footballer, is Safet's older brother. Safet's nephew, Tino-Sven Sušić, is also a footballer, formerly even a player of Sarajevo who also alongside Safet appeared at the 2014 FIFA World Cup in Brazil. Safet's mother Paša died on 28 April 2018 at the age of 96.

== Career statistics ==
=== Club ===
Appearances and goals by club, season and competition
Club	Season	League			Cup		Continental		Total	
Club	Season	Division	Apps	Goals	Apps	Goals	Apps	Goals	Apps	Goals
Sarajevo	1973–74	Yugoslav First League	10	2	0	0	2	0	12	2
Sarajevo	1974–75	Yugoslav First League	33	11	1	0	–		34	11
Sarajevo	1975–76	Yugoslav First League	16	2	0	0	–		16	2
Sarajevo	1976–77	Yugoslav First League	28	9	3	3	–		31	12
Sarajevo	1977–78	Yugoslav First League	33	8	2	0	–		35	8
Sarajevo	1978–79	Yugoslav First League	30	15	1	0	–		31	15
Sarajevo	1979–80	Yugoslav First League	34	17	4	1	–		38	18
Sarajevo	1980–81	Yugoslav First League	7	2	0	0	2	2	9	4
Sarajevo	1981–82	Yugoslav First League	17	11	0	0	–		17	11
Sarajevo	1982–83	Yugoslav First League	13	9	2	2	6	2	21	13
Sarajevo	Total		221	86	13	6	10	4	244	96
Paris Saint-Germain	1982–83	French Division 1	18	8					18	8
Paris Saint-Germain	1983–84	French Division 1	38	8				1	38	9
Paris Saint-Germain	1984–85	French Division 1	34	10				2	34	12
Paris Saint-Germain	1985–86	French Division 1	37	10			–		37	10
Paris Saint-Germain	1986–87	French Division 1	29	3			2	0	31	3
Paris Saint-Germain	1987–88	French Division 1	24	3			–		24	3
Paris Saint-Germain	1988–89	French Division 1	34	7			–		34	7
Paris Saint-Germain	1989–90	French Division 1	36	7				1	36	8
Paris Saint-Germain	1990–91	French Division 1	37	10			–		37	10
Paris Saint-Germain	Total		287	67		14		4	344	85
Red Star	1991–92	Division 2	17	3			–		17	3
Career total			525	155		20		8	605	184

=== International ===
Appearances and goals by national team and year
National team	Year	Apps	Goals
Yugoslavia	1977	4	5
Yugoslavia	1978	4	0
Yugoslavia	1979	5	6
Yugoslavia	1980	6	3
Yugoslavia	1981	2	0
Yugoslavia	1982	4	0
Yugoslavia	1983	5	3
Yugoslavia	1984	5	2
Yugoslavia	1985	0	0
Yugoslavia	1986	0	0
Yugoslavia	1987	0	0
Yugoslavia	1988	2	1
Yugoslavia	1989	7	0
Yugoslavia	1990	10	1
Total		54	21

=== International goals ===
Scores and results list Yugoslavia's goal tally first, score column indicates score after each Sušić goal.

List of international goals scored by Safet Sušić
No.	Date	Venue	Opponent	Score	Result	Competition
1	5 October 1977	Budapest, Hungary	Hungary	1–2	3–4	Friendly
2	5 October 1977	Budapest, Hungary	Hungary	3–4	3–4	Friendly
3	13 November 1977	Bucharest, Romania	Romania	1–1	6–4	1978 World Cup qualifier
4	13 November 1977	Bucharest, Romania	Romania	3–3	6–4	1978 World Cup qualifier
5	13 November 1977	Bucharest, Romania	Romania	4–3	6–4	1978 World Cup qualifier
6	13 June 1979	Maksimir, Zagreb, Yugoslavia	Italy	1–1	4–1	Friendly
7	13 June 1979	Maksimir, Zagreb, Yugoslavia	Italy	2–1	4–1	Friendly
8	13 June 1979	Maksimir, Zagreb, Yugoslavia	Italy	3–1	4–1	Friendly
9	16 September 1979	Marakana, Belgrade, Yugoslavia	Argentina	1–0	4–2	Friendly
10	16 September 1979	Marakana, Belgrade, Yugoslavia	Argentina	2–0	4–2	Friendly
11	16 September 1979	Marakana, Belgrade, Yugoslavia	Argentina	3–0	4–2	Friendly
12	30 March 1980	Belgrade, Yugoslavia	Romania	2–0	2–0	Balkan Cup
13	27 August 1980	Bucharest, Romania	Romania	1–3	1–4	Balkan Cup
14	10 September 1980	Luxembourg, Luxembourg	Luxembourg	1–0	5–0	1982 World Cup qualifier
15	12 October 1983	JNA, Belgrade, Yugoslavia	Norway	2–0	2–1	Euro 1984 qualifier
16	21 December 1983	Poljud, Split, Yugoslavia	Bulgaria	1–1	3–2	Euro 1984 qualifier
17	21 December 1983	Poljud, Split, Yugoslavia	Bulgaria	2–1	3–2	Euro 1984 qualifier
18	2 June 1984	Lisbon, Portugal	Portugal	1–1	3–2	Friendly
19	7 June 1984	La Línea, Spain	Spain	1–0	1–0	Friendly
20	19 November 1988	JNA, Belgrade, Yugoslavia	France	2–2	3–2	1990 World Cup qualifier
21	19 June 1990	Dall'Ara, Bologna, Italy	United Arab Emirates	1–0	4–1	1990 World Cup

== Managerial statistics ==
Managerial record by team and tenure
Team	From	To	Record							
Team	From	To	G	W	D	L	GF	GA	GD	Win %
Cannes	1 July 1994	11 September 1995	52	20	9	23	83	75	+8	38.46
İstanbulspor	25 September 1996	30 June 1999	102	45	25	32	178	148	+30	44.12
Al Hilal	1 February 2001	30 June 2001	6	2	2	2	9	8	+1	33.33
Konyaspor	1 October 2004	30 June 2005	28	10	8	10	58	53	+5	35.71
Ankaragücü	23 September 2005	9 February 2006	13	5	4	4	19	18	+1	38.46
Çaykur Rizespor	15 September 2006	19 January 2007	5	2	1	2	5	5	+0	40.00
Çaykur Rizespor	31 August 2007	1 February 2008	14	6	2	6	18	24	−6	42.86
Ankaraspor	6 March 2008	30 June 2008	10	5	2	3	11	8	+3	50.00
Bosnia and Herzegovina	29 December 2009	17 November 2014	49	23	9	17	83	49	+34	46.94
Évian	12 July 2015	11 January 2016	23	7	6	10	37	33	+4	30.43
Alanyaspor	27 January 2017	25 December 2017	35	13	5	17	62	64	−2	37.14
Akhisarspor	30 June 2018	17 September 2018	6	1	2	3	10	13	−3	16.67
Total			343	139	75	129	573	498	+75	40.52

== Honours ==
=== Player ===
Paris Saint-Germain

- French Division 1: 1985–86
- Coupe de France: 1982–83

Individual

- Yugoslav First League top goalscorer: 1979–80
- Yugoslav Footballer of the Year: 1979
- Sport Ideal European XI: 1979
- ADN Eastern European Footballer of the Season: 1979, 1984
- Ligue 1 Foreign Player of the Year: 1982–83
- Ballon d'Or nominee: 1983 (15th)
- UEFA Jubilee Awards – Greatest Bosnian Footballer of the last 50 Years: 2003

=== Manager ===
Akhisarspor

- Turkish Super Cup: 2018

Individual

- Bosnian Coach of the Year: 2013

== Awards ==
- Sixth April Award of Sarajevo: 1981
