= 1985 Artemio Franchi Cup =

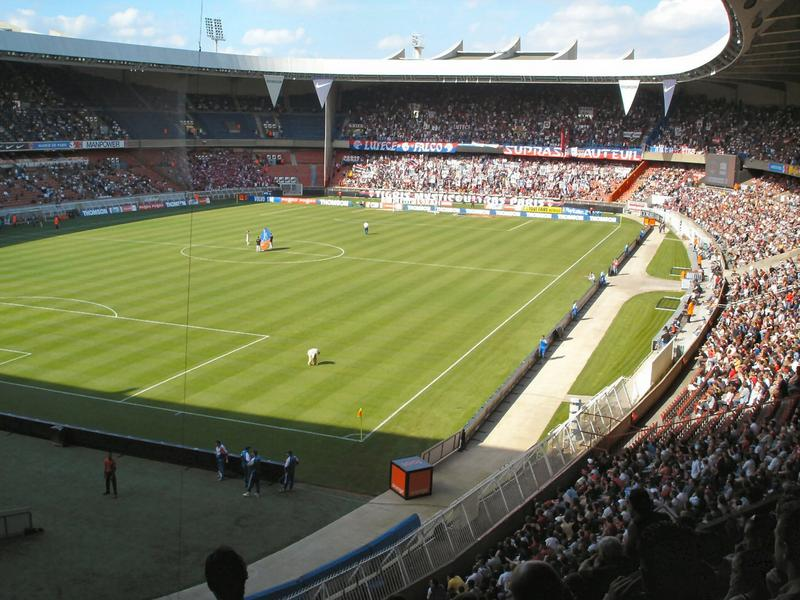
- The Parc des Princes in Paris hosted the match.
- Event: Artemio Franchi Cup
France	Uruguay
2	0
- Date: 21 August 1985
- Venue: Parc des Princes, Paris
- Referee: Abel Gnecco (Argentina)
- Attendance: 20,405

The 1985 Artemio Franchi Cup was the first edition of the Artemio Franchi Cup, a football match between the winners of the previous South American and European championships. The match featured France, winners of UEFA Euro 1984, and Uruguay, winners of the 1983 Copa América. It was played at Parc des Princes in Paris, France, on 21 August 1985.

France won the match 2–0 to become the first champions of the Artemio Franchi Cup.

== Teams ==
Team	Confederation	Qualification
France	UEFA	Winners of UEFA Euro 1984
Uruguay	CONMEBOL	Winners of the 1983 Copa América

== Match ==
=== Details ===
21 August 1985
20:00 CEST

France	2–0	Uruguay
Rocheteau 4'; Touré 56'	Report

Parc des Princes, Paris
Attendance: 20,405
Referee: Abel Gnecco (Argentina)

France	Uruguay

GK	1	Joël Bats
DF	2	Michel Bibard
DF	4	Yvon Le Roux
DF	5	Maxime Bossis
DF	3	William Ayache
MF	6	Alain Giresse
MF	7	Luis Fernandez
MF	10	Michel Platini (c)
MF	8	Thierry Tusseau
FW	11	José Touré
FW	9	Dominique Rocheteau
Substitutes:
GK	16	Albert Rust
DF	12	Jean-François Domergue
MF	13	Philippe Vercruysse
MF	14	Bruno Bellone
FW	15	Yannick Stopyra
Manager:
Henri Michel

GK	1	Rodolfo Rodríguez (c)
DF	4	Víctor Diogo	(yellow card) 20'
DF	2	Nelson Gutiérrez	(yellow card) 65'
DF	3	Darío Pereyra	(yellow card) 22'
DF	6	José Batista
MF	8	Jorge Barrios		(substituted off) 77'
MF	5	Miguel Bossio
MF	10	Sergio Santín
MF	7	Venancio Ramos
FW	9	Enzo Francescoli
FW	11	Wilmar Cabrera		(substituted off) 77'
Substitutes:
GK	12	Fernando Álvez
DF	13	Eduardo Acevedo
DF	14	Néstor Montelongo
MF	15	Mario Saralegui		(substituted on) 77'
FW	16	Gustavo Dalto		(substituted on) 77'
Manager:
Omar Borrás

Match rules

- 90 minutes.
- 30 minutes of extra time if necessary.
- Penalty shoot-out if scores still level.
- Five named substitutes.
- Maximum of two substitutions.
