= Gustavo Dalto =

Uruguayan footballer and manager (born 1963)

Personal information
- Full name: Gustavo Dalto
- Date of birth: 16 March 1963 (age 63)
- Place of birth: Pando, Uruguay
- Height: 1.77 m (5 ft 10 in)
- Position: Midfielder

Senior career*
Years	Team	Apps	(Gls)
1981–1990	Danubio	211	(47)
1990–1991	Xerez	9	(0)
1991	Independiente Santa Fe	14	(1)
1991–1992	Talleres de Córdoba	23	(0)
1992	Once Caldas		
1992	Peñarol	18	(3)
1993	Racing Club de Montevideo		
1994	La Luz		
1997	Juventud de Las Piedras		

International career
1985–1989	Uruguay	12	(1)

Managerial career
- Danubio
Medal record
Representing Uruguay
Copa América
Winner	1987 Argentina
CONMEBOL–UEFA Cup of Champions
Runner-up	1985 France
- * Club domestic league appearances and goals

Gustavo Dalto (born 16 March 1963) is a former Uruguayan footballer and football manager.

== Career ==
Dalto played for Talleres de Córdoba in the Primera División de Argentina. Dalto made 12 appearances for the senior Uruguay national football team from 1985 to 1989.
