= Michel Bibard =

French footballer and manager (born 1958)

Personal information
- Date of birth: 30 November 1958 (age 67)
- Place of birth: Amboise, France
- Height: 1.85 m (6 ft 1 in)
- Position: Defender

Team information
- Current team: FC Saint-Cloud (manager)

Youth career
- 1967–1974: Saumur

Senior career*
Years	Team	Apps	(Gls)
1976–1985	Nantes	153	(5)
1985–1991	Paris Saint-Germain	160	(1)
1991–1992	Sur SC		
Total		313+	(6+)

International career
1984–1986	France	6	(0)

Managerial career
- 1993–2001: Rueil U15
- 2001–2002: Paris Saint-Germain U17
- 2002–2007: Rueil
- 2007–: FC Saint-Cloud
Medal record
Men's football
Representing France
Gold medal – first place	1984 Los Angeles	Team competition
CONMEBOL–UEFA Cup of Champions
Winner	1985 France
- * Club domestic league appearances and goals

Michel Bibard (born 30 November 1958) is a French football manager and former player. He is the head coach of French club FC Saint-Cloud.

As a player, Bibard was a defender. He won the gold medal with the France Olympic team at the 1984 Summer Olympics in Los Angeles, and earned six international caps for the main France national team during the mid-1980s. A player of Paris Saint-Germain from 1985 to 1991, he was a member of the France team at the 1986 FIFA World Cup.

== Honours ==
Nantes

- Division 1: 1976–77, 1979–80, 1982–83
- Coupe de France: 1978–79; runner-up: 1982–83

Paris Saint-Germain

- Division 1: 1985–86

France Olympic

- Summer Olympic Games: 1984

France

- Artemio Franchi Trophy: 1985
