= Pascal Zaremba =

French footballer (born 1959)

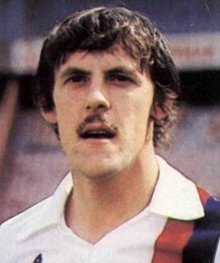
- Zaremba with Paris Saint-Germain

Personal information
- Date of birth: 2 September 1959 (age 67)
- Place of birth: Fresnes-sur-Escaut, France
- Height: 1.87 m (6 ft 2 in)
- Positions: Centre-back; defensive midfielder

Youth career
- 1971–1977: Fresnes-sur-Escaut
- 1977–1978: Valenciennes

Senior career*
Years	Team	Apps	(Gls)
1978–1982	Valenciennes	73	(17)
1982–1984	Paris Saint-Germain	59	(10)
1984–1986	Lens	72	(7)
1986–1987	Le Havre	31	(2)
1987–1989	Nancy	66	(2)
1989–1990	Vieux-Condé Foot		
1990–1993	Beauvais	94	(4)
1993–1994	Valenciennes	15	(0)
Total		410+	(42+)

International career
- France U21
- France B

Managerial career
- 1997: Valenciennes U17
- 1998: Valenciennes B (assistant)
- 1998–2001: Valenciennes (assistant)
- 2001–2003: Valenciennes B (assistant)
- Valenciennes B (assistant)
- * Club domestic league appearances and goals

Pascal Zaremba (born 2 September 1959) is a French former professional footballer who played as a centre-back and defensive midfielder.

== Club career ==
A youth graduate of Valenciennes, Zaremba was a versatile centre-back and defensive midfielder in his playing days. He notably scored from a free-kick in the 1983 Coupe de France final for Paris Saint-Germain in a 3–2 win over Nantes.

== International career ==
Zaremba was a U21 international for France. He also played for the France B team.

== Managerial career ==
Zaremba retired from football in 1994. He initially went to coach children in the Valenciennes youth academy before becoming the U17 team's coach in 1997. He stayed in this role from only July to December 1997, and became the assistant manager for the Valenciennes B team in January 1998.

In June 1998, Zaremba left his role as B team assistant to become assistant for the senior A team of the club. In 2001, he returned to the B team as assistant coach.

== Personal life ==
Pascal's older brother Bruno was also a footballer.

== Honours ==
Paris Saint-Germain

- Coupe de France: 1982–83
