= William Ayache =

French footballer and manager (born 1961)

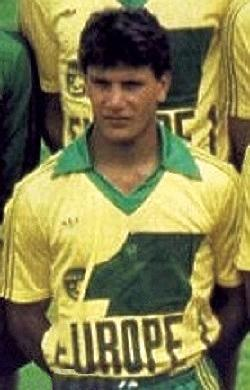
- Ayache with Nantes in 1980

Personal information
- Date of birth: 10 January 1961 (age 65)
- Place of birth: Algiers, French Algeria
- Height: 1.76 m (5 ft 9 in)
- Position: Full-back

Senior career*
Years	Team	Apps	(Gls)
1979–1986	Nantes	188	(2)
1986–1987	Paris Saint-Germain	24	(0)
1987–1988	Marseille	25	(0)
1988–1989	Nantes	22	(0)
1989–1990	Bordeaux	1	(1)
1989–1990	→ Montpellier (loan)	10	(0)
1990–1991	Nice	0	(0)
1991	→ Marseille (loan)	0	(0)
1991–1992	Nîmes	33	(1)
1992–1995	Cannes	75	(1)
Total		378	(5)

International career
1983–1988	France	20	(0)

Managerial career
- 1995: Cannes (assistant)
- 1995: Cannes (caretaker)
- 1995–1996: Cannes (assistant)
- 1996–2000: Athletic Bilbao (assistant)
Medal record
Men's football
Representing France
Gold medal – first place	1984 Los Angeles	Team competition
FIFA World Cup
Third place	1986 Mexico	National team
CONMEBOL–UEFA Cup of Champions
Winner	1985 France	National team
- * Club domestic league appearances and goals

William Ayache (Arabic: ويليام عياش, born 10 January 1961) is a French former professional footballer who played as a side back, both left and right, and then manager.

== International career ==
At international level, Ayache participated at the 1984 Summer Olympics with the France national team, winning the gold medal, and was also a member of the team that finished third at the 1986 FIFA World Cup. All together, he was capped 20 times for his country.

== Honours ==
=== Player ===
Nantes

- Division 1: 1979–80, 1982–83

Montpellier

- Coupe de France: 1989–90

France

- Summer Olympic Games Gold Medal: 1984
- FIFA World Cup third place: 1986
- Artemio Franchi Cup: 1985
