= Jean-Paul Bertrand-Demanes =

French footballer (born 1952)

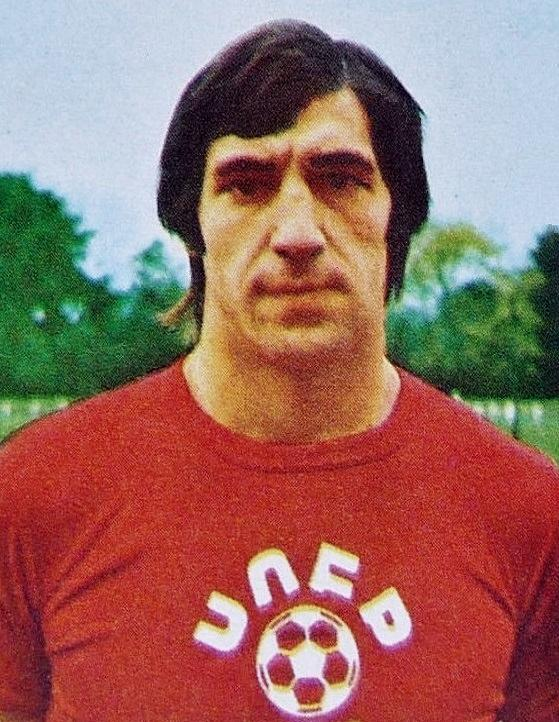
- Bertrand-Demanes in 1974

Personal information
- Full name: Jean-Paul Fernand Gabriel Bertrand-Demanes
- Date of birth: 13 May 1952 (age 74)
- Place of birth: Casablanca, French Morocco
- Height: 1.92 m (6 ft 4 in)
- Position: Goalkeeper

Youth career
- Pouillac

Senior career*
Years	Team	Apps	(Gls)
1969–1987	Nantes	532	(0)

International career
1973–1978	France	11	(0)
- * Club domestic league appearances and goals

Jean-Paul Fernand Gabriel Bertrand-Demanes (French: [ʒɑ̃ pɔl fɛʁnɑ̃ ɡabʁijɛl bɛʁtʁɑ̃ dəman]; born 13 May 1952) is a French former professional footballer who played as a goalkeeper. He earned eleven international caps for the France national team during the 1970s and was part of the France national team in the 1978 FIFA World Cup. Professionally Bertrand-Demanes spent his whole career with FC Nantes (1969–1987).

During the 1978 World Cup he played in the matches against Italy and Argentina, but was injured in the latter match after he crashed his spine against a goalpost and had to be substituted. He never played for France again.

== See also ==
- One-club man
