= Mamadou Bagayoko =

Footballer (born 1979)

Personal information
- Date of birth: 21 May 1979 (age 47)
- Place of birth: Paris, France
- Height: 1.90 m (6 ft 3 in)
- Position: Forward

Youth career
- 1997–1998: USL Dunkerque

Senior career*
Years	Team	Apps	(Gls)
1998	USL Dunkerque	7	(0)
1998–1999	FC Sens	34	(29)
1999–2003	Strasbourg	64	(4)
2003–2004	Ajaccio	34	(8)
2004–2009	Nantes	77	(24)
2005–2006	→ Nice (Loan)	32	(5)
2006–2007	→ Al-Wahda (Loan)	19	(4)
2009–2011	Nice	28	(1)
2011–2012	PAS Giannina	1	(0)
2012–2013	Doncaster Rovers	5	(2)
2013–2014	US Luzenac	9	(2)
Total		310	(79)

International career
2000–2010	Mali	34	(6)
- * Club domestic league appearances and goals

Mamadou Bagayoko (born 21 May 1979) is a former professional footballer who played as a forward. Born in France, he represented Mali at international level.

== Club career ==
Bagayoko was born in Paris. His debut at senior level came in 1999 for RC Strasbourg. He moved to AC Ajaccio in August 2003 and was seen as an integral figure in helping to keep the club in Ligue 1 that season.

Nantes signed him for around €1.3 million in July 2004 as a replacement for Marama Vahirua on a four-year contract but ended up moving on loan to OGC Nice in July 2005, helping them reach the final of the French League Cup which they lost 2–1 to Nancy.

In November 2010 he had a trial at Wolverhampton Wanderers.

On 23 December 2011, it was confirmed that Bagayoko would be joining Doncaster Rovers. The transfer eventually took place on 1 January 2012. He made his Doncaster debut in the 2–0 home loss to Notts County in the FA Cup. On 18 February 2012, Bagayoko scored two goals from the bench for Doncaster in their 3–2 loss away to Leeds United.

In January 2013, US Luzenac signed free agent Bagayoko.

== Honours ==
- FIFA World Youth Championship third place: 1999
