= Patrice Rio =

French footballer (born 1948)

Personal information
- Date of birth: 15 August 1948 (age 78)
- Place of birth: Le Petit-Quevilly, Seine-Maritime, France
- Position: Defender

Youth career
- Rouen

Senior career*
Years	Team	Apps	(Gls)
1969–1970	Rouen	33	(0)
1970–1984	Nantes	436	(20)
1984–1987	Rennes	72	(8)
Total		541	(28)

International career
1976–1978	France	17	(0)
- * Club domestic league appearances and goals

Patrice Rio (born 15 August 1948) is a French former professional footballer who played as a defender, spending most of his career with Nantes (1970–1984). He obtained a total number of 17 international caps for the France national football team in the 1970s and was a member of the French squad that competed at the 1978 FIFA World Cup. His father, Roger, was also a French international footballer.

== Honours ==
Nantes

- French championship: 1973, 1977, 1980, 1983
- Coupe de France: 1979
