= José Touré =

French footballer (born 1961)

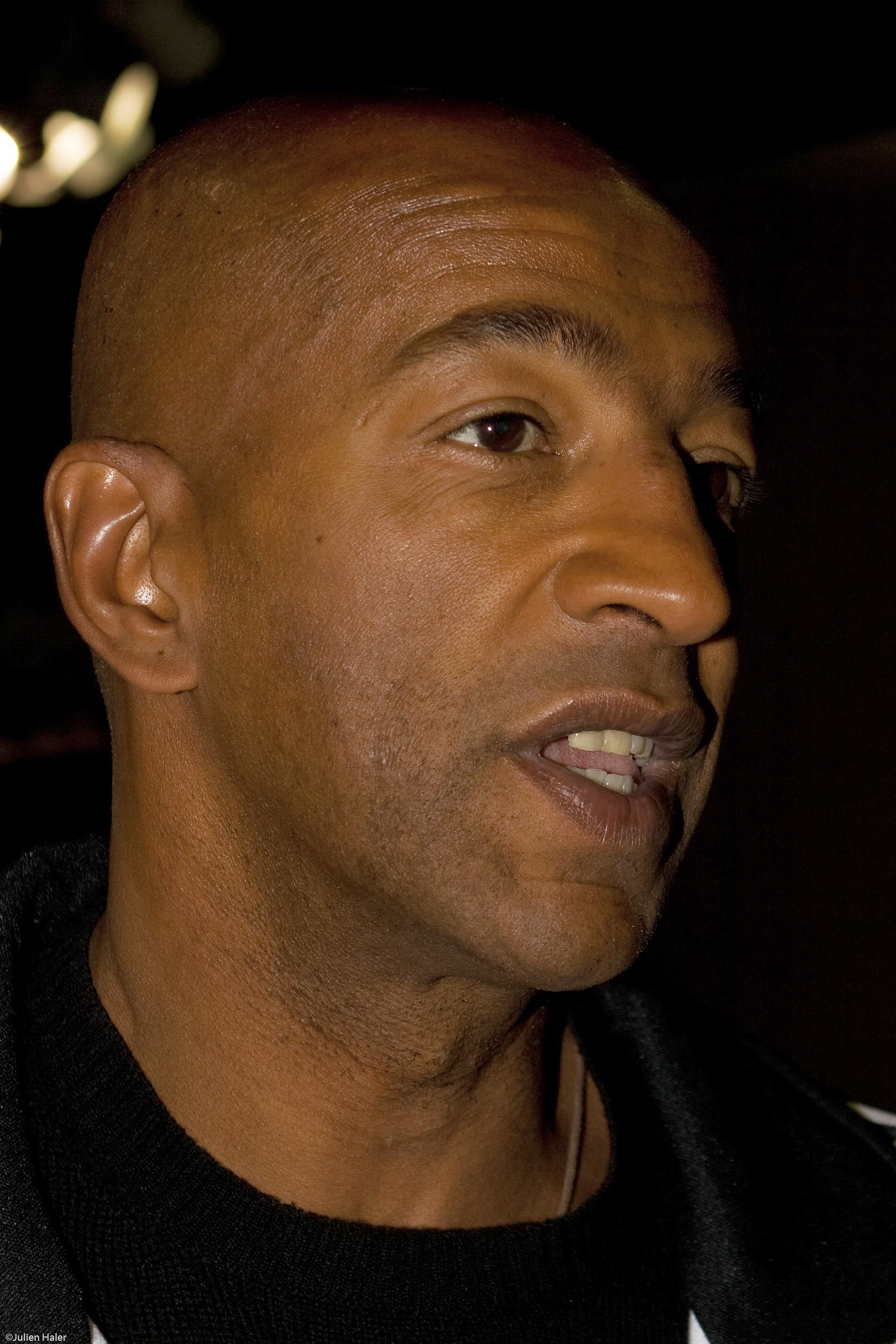
- Touré in 2009

Personal information
- Date of birth: 24 April 1961 (age 65)
- Place of birth: Nancy, France
- Position: Midfielder

Senior career*
Years	Team	Apps	(Gls)
1979–1986	Nantes	156	(21)
1986–1988	Bordeaux	54	(17)
1988–1990	Monaco	55	(6)
Total		265	(44)

International career
1983–1989	France	16	(4)
Medal record
Men's football
Representing France
Olympic Games
Gold medal – first place	1984 Los Angeles
CONMEBOL–UEFA Cup of Champions
Winner	1985 France
- * Club domestic league appearances and goals

José Touré (born 24 April 1961) is a French former professional footballer who played as a midfielder.

== Club career ==
On 11 June 1983, Touré scored a memorable goal for Nantes in the Coupe de France final to give his side the lead against Paris Saint-Germain, however Nantes eventually fell to a 3–2 defeat.

On 10 June 1987, Touré started for Bordeaux against Marseille in the final of the 1986–87 Coupe de France, with his side coming out 2–0 winners.

== International career ==
Touré was a member of the French squad that won the gold medal at the 1984 Summer Olympics in Los Angeles, California.

On 21 August 1985, Touré scored in France's 2–0 victory over Uruguay to become the inaugural winners of the CONMEBOL–UEFA Cup of Champions.

== Personal life ==
His father, Bako Touré, was a Malian international footballer.

== Honours ==
Nantes

- Division 1: 1979–80, 1982–83
- Cup of the Alps: 1982

Bordeaux

- Division 1: 1986–87
- Coupe de France: 1986–87

France Olympic

- Summer Olympics: 1984

France

- CONMEBOL–UEFA Cup of Champions: 1985
