= Vahid Halilhodžić =

Bosnian football manager (born 1952)

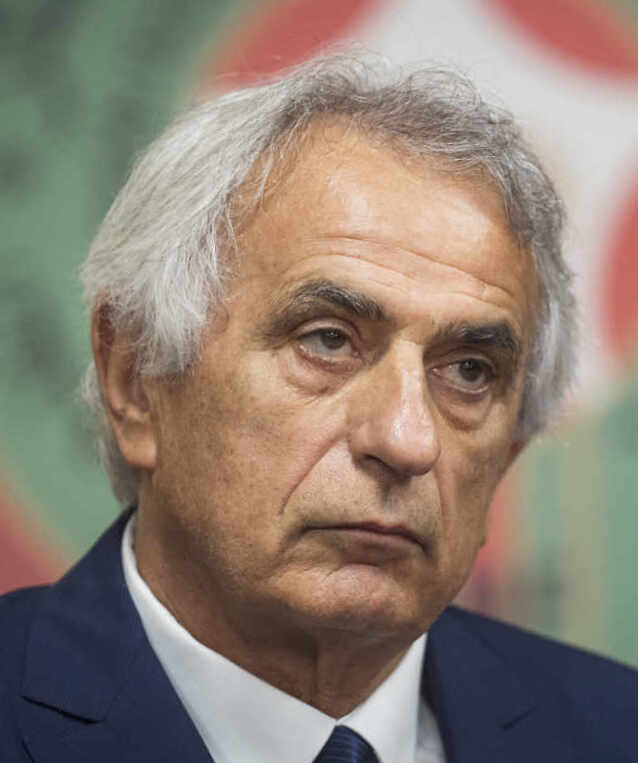
- Halilhodžić as Morocco manager in 2019

Personal information
- Date of birth: 15 October 1952 (age 74)
- Place of birth: Jablanica, PR Bosnia and Herzegovina, FPR Yugoslavia
- Height: 1.82 m (6 ft 0 in)
- Position: Forward

Youth career
- –1968: Turbina Jablanica
- 1968–1971: Velež Mostar

Senior career*
| Years | Team | Apps | (Gls) |
| 1971–1981 | Velež Mostar | 207 | (103) |
| 1971–1972 | → Neretva (loan) | 18 | (8) |
| 1981–1986 | Nantes | 163 | (93) |
| 1986–1987 | Paris Saint-Germain | 18 | (8) |
| Total | | 406 | (211) |

International career
| 1975–1978 | Yugoslavia U21 | 12 | (12) |
| 1976–1985 | Yugoslavia | 15 | (8) |

Managerial career
- 1993–1994: Beauvais
- 1997–1998: Raja Casablanca
- 1998–2002: Lille
- 2002–2003: Rennes
- 2003–2005: Paris Saint-Germain
- 2005–2006: Trabzonspor
- 2006: Al-Ittihad
- 2008–2010: Ivory Coast
- 2010–2011: Dinamo Zagreb
- 2011–2014: Algeria
- 2014: Trabzonspor
- 2015–2018: Japan
- 2018–2019: Nantes
- 2019–2022: Morocco
- 2026: Nantes
Medal record
Competitor for Yugoslavia
| Gold medal – first place | UEFA U-21 Euro | 1978 |
- * Club domestic league appearances and goals

Vahid Halilhodžić (Bosnian pronunciation: [ʋȃ:xid xǎlilxodʒitɕ]; born 15 October 1952) is a Bosnian former professional football manager and former player. He is regarded as one of the most controversially successful Bosnian football managers, due to his successful tenure in coaching various national teams yet having problematic relations with his teams and players due to different approaches.

Regarded as one of the best Yugoslav players, Halilhodžić had successful playing spells with Velež Mostar and French clubs Nantes and Paris Saint-Germain before retiring in 1987. During that time, he earned 15 full international caps for Yugoslavia and was part of national squads who won the 1978 European Under-21 Championship and played at the 1982 FIFA World Cup. He was top scorer of the French league in 1983 and 1985.

In the early 1990s, Halilhodžić turned to coaching and, after a short stint as a sporting director at Velež, permanently moved to France in 1993 after fleeing war-torn Bosnia with his family. Since then, he managed a number of teams in French-speaking countries and his achievements include winning the 1997 CAF Champions League with Moroccan side Raja Casablanca, leading French side Lille from second level to third place in Ligue 1 in less than three years, winning the 2003–04 Coupe de France with Paris Saint-Germain, and winning the Croatian league in 2011 with Dinamo Zagreb.

Halilhodžić also qualified for the 2010 World Cup with Ivory Coast (although he was sacked only months before the final tournament) and the 2014 World Cup with Algeria, with whom he reached the round of 16, Algeria's best result in history. Later, he qualified for the 2018 World Cup with Japan, but again was fired just prior to the tournament. After a short stint with Nantes in 2018, where he helped avoid relegation to Ligue 2, Halilhodžić became head coach of the Morocco national team, whom he qualified for the 2022 World Cup. Like with Ivory Coast and Japan, he was sacked by the Royal Moroccan Football Federation in August 2022, after Morocco's poor performance at the 2021 Africa Cup of Nations and his fallout with star player Hakim Ziyech.

== Playing career ==
=== Early life and Velež ===
Born in Jablanica, Halilhodžić started playing football in his early teens at local minnows Turbina Jablanica, as the club's ground was located some 100 metres from his family home. According to his admission, he did not consider becoming a professional footballer at the time and instead chose to continue his formal education, moving to the nearby city of Mostar at age 14 to study at the local electrotechnical high school, without ever appearing for Turbina in an official match. Nevertheless, it was in Mostar that he first started taking football seriously as he went on to join Yugoslav First League side Velež Mostar academy at age 16, in part on the insistence of his brother Salem, who at the time played for the club as a striker. Halilhodžić then went on to play there at youth levels for the next two and a half years, and, upon signing a professional contract with the club, was sent on a six-month loan to second-level side Neretva Metković to gain some experience.

Upon his return from loan, he quickly broke into the first-team squad in the 1972–73 season, forming a successful attacking partnership with Dušan Bajević and helping Velež finish the season as league runners-up behind Red Star Belgrade. Halilhodžić then went on to become one of the club's key players throughout the 1970s, appearing in a total of 376 matches and scoring 253 goals for the club (including 207 appearances and 103 goals in the Yugoslav First League) before leaving the country in September 1981 to join French side Nantes. Earlier that year, he was instrumental in winning the club's first major silverware, scoring two goals in their 3–2 Yugoslav Cup final win against Željezničar.

=== Nantes and PSG ===
At Nantes, he struggled in his first year although he quickly became a first-team regular, scoring 7 goals in 28 appearances in the 1981–82 season. He also got sent off in the first round of the UEFA Cup vs. Lokeren and received a 4 matches suspension from UEFA. The following season, he helped Nantes win their sixth French championship title and was the league's top scorer with 27 goals in 36 appearances. Halilhodžić went on to spend five years at La Beaujoire, appearing in a total of 163 league matches and scoring 92 goals for the club, also becoming league top scorer in the 1984–85 season with 28 goals.

In 1986, Halilhodžić decided to return to Mostar so he could spend more time with his father, who in the meantime fell seriously ill. While negotiating a new contract with Nantes, he intentionally asked for a salary bigger than anything the club could afford so that he could be released and return home. However, Francis Borelli, chairman of Paris Saint-Germain, stepped in and made him a "fantastic offer" to sign a one-year contract, with the intention of bringing Halilhodžić to Parc des Princes in order to strengthen the team for their upcoming 1986–87 European Cup campaign.

Halilhodžić accepted the offer and went on to appear for the club in the first 18 games of the 1986–87 season, scoring eight goals. However, his mother back home died during the season, and it was then that Halilhodžić decided to finally retire from active football.

== International career ==
Halilhodžić was capped 15 times for the Yugoslavia national team, scoring eight goals. After debuting as a full international in June 1976, he also appeared in a few matches for Yugoslavia under-21 team in 1978, helping them win the 1978 European Under-21 Championship where he claimed the Golden Player award for the best player in the tournament. Halilhodžić, who was 26 at the time, took advantage of the rule that allowed two players over the age of 21 to participate – hence him and Velimir Zajec (who had also already debuted for Yugoslavia full squad in 1977) were the two senior players brought in to strengthen the under-21 squad.

Spanning nine years, Halilhodžić's time with the national team was marked by frequently alternating ups and downs, periods of automatic inclusion followed by years-long omissions and frustrating substitute stints.

He made his debut as a substitute at UEFA Euro 1976 under head coach Biće Mladinić during the third place match versus Holland that Yugoslavia lost 2–3 at Zagreb's Maksimir Stadium. The 23-year-old Halilhodžić came on for Slaviša Žungul.

Over the next couple of years, he recorded two more substitute appearances – first in September 1976 in a friendly against Italy in Rome and in November 1977 at home against Spain (the infamously violent qualifying home loss at Belgrade's Marakana that ended Yugoslavia's chances of going to the 1978 World Cup).

=== Euro 80 qualifying ===
It was not until October 1978 that now 26-year-old Halilhodžić (riding high from his under-21 European championship win) got his first national team start – the opening Euro 80 qualifying clash versus Spain at home in Maksimir. With his first inclusion in the starting lineup by returning coach Mladinić also came his first goal – Yugoslavia was down 0–2 in the first half when Halilhodžić pulled one back in the 44th minute for 1–2, which ended up being the final score as Yugoslavia again lost at home to Spain. With his performance versus Spain, Halilhodžić's stock was somewhat raised and as a result he got to start the next qualifier away at Romania that Yugoslavia also lost, this time 2–3. The second consecutive qualifier loss prompted the end of Biće Mladinić's time as head coach – he got replaced by interim coach Dražan Jerković. Halilhodžić played the next friendly match under Jerković, scoring a hat-trick against Greece.

The resumption of Euro 1980 qualifying five months later in April 1979 saw the return of Miljan Miljanić to the Yugoslav bench as the FA's permanent solution at the head coaching position. Miljanić made major changes to the team he inherited from Mladinić with Halilhodžić one of the many casualties. The changes worked as Yugoslavia won its remaining four qualifiers (including a win away at Spain) as well as its two friendlies versus Italy and Argentina (none of the six matches featured Halilhodžić), but the opening two losses still proved too much to overcome as Plavi finished a point behind Spain in the group and did not progress to Euro 1980.

=== 1982 World Cup ===
Halilhodžić made two substitute appearances at the 1982 World Cup: playing the last 15 minutes of the controversial group match versus Spain as well as the entire second half against Honduras. For the position of forward at the tournament, Miljanić preferred Safet Sušić, and in his later interviews, Halilhodžić often expressed dismay and disappointment with head coach Miljanić for not giving him a more prominent role in the Yugoslav team at the 1982 World Cup.

On multiple occasions in the 2000s and 2010s, looking back on his playing days, retired-from-playing-football Halilhodžić expressed bitterness over not getting a bigger part in the national team during the 1970s and 1980s, sarcastically citing his surname being "too long for Belgrade scoreboards" as the reason, thus insinuating that discrimination against Muslims was behind his lack of playing time in the Yugoslavia national team. In a 2023 interview, Halilhodžić claimed that Yugoslav politics had a strong influence on the country's 1982 World Cup squad selection, adding non-specifically that "certain players had to make that team" and that "Hajduk Split and Red Star Belgrade players were privileged" over those from comparatively smaller sides.

== Managerial career ==
=== Raja Casablanca ===
In July 1997, he signed with Moroccan side Raja Casablanca. In his first season with the club, he won the 1997 CAF Champions League in December 1997, and the 1997–98 Moroccan Championship in May 1998. These successes raised his international profile.

=== Lille ===
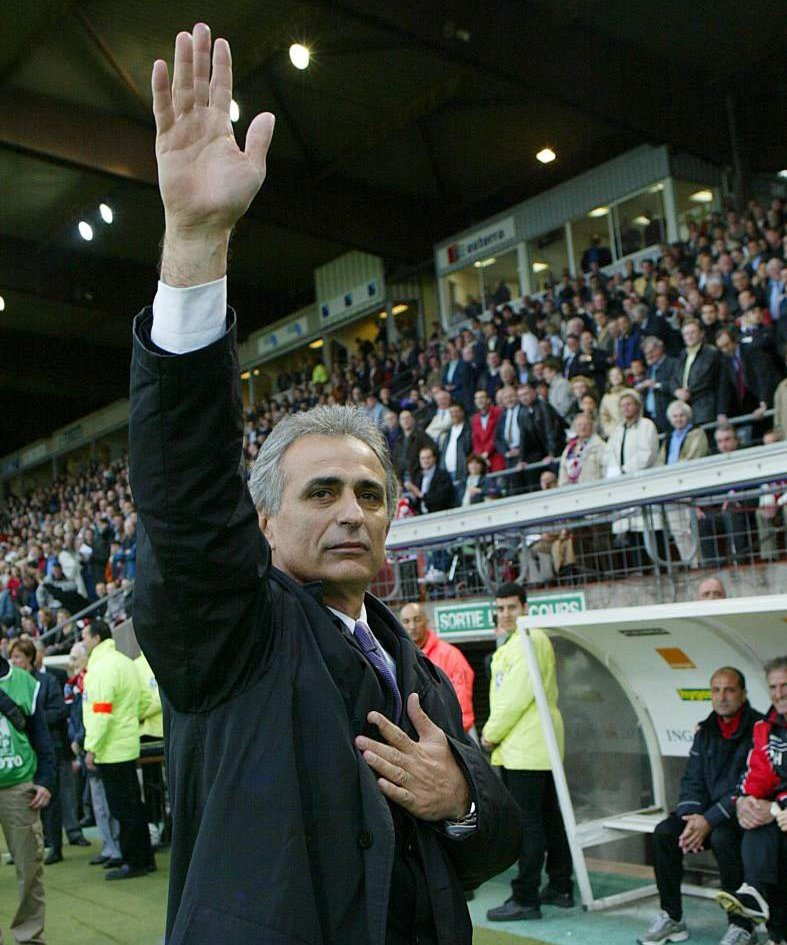
Halilhodžić saluting Lille supporters

In October 1998, he returned to France to coach Lille, which at the time was struggling to survive in the French Division 2. His first season at the club ended with Lille finishing fourth, missing a promotion spot on goal difference. In the 1999–2000 season, Halilhodžić's club dominated the competition and finished top of table, 16 points clear of second-placed Guingamp, earning promotion to the French Ligue 1.

Lille's strong performances on the pitch continued the following season, and they finished third in the 2000–01 French Division 1, only seven points behind champions Nantes, thus qualifying for the 2001–02 UEFA Champions League for the first time in club's history. The following season, after knocking out Parma in qualifying, Lille finished third in group stage behind Deportivo de La Coruña and Manchester United, progressing to the 2001–02 UEFA Cup where they reached the Round of 16 before being knocked out by Borussia Dortmund on away goals.

=== Rennes ===
On 14 October 2002, he was hired by another Ligue 1 club, Rennes, to save them from relegation after the club had picked up only eight points in the opening ten matches of the season under Philippe Bergeroo. Halilhodžić then managed to take the club to a 15th-place finish in the 20-club league, avoiding relegation zone by two points. After his successes with Lille and Rennes, he started to become one of the most sought after coaches in Europe, and whilst receiving offers from several German and Spanish clubs, he joined Paris Saint-Germain in June 2003.

=== Paris Saint-Germain ===
During his first season at the helm of PSG, the club won the 2003–04 Coupe de France and arrived second in the 2003–04 Ligue 1, just three points behind Lyon, qualifying for the 2004–05 Champions League.

Halilhodžić's second season at the club, however, was not a success. From their opening Champions League group stage 0–3 home loss versus Chelsea, to their French league struggles, PSG never succeeded in replicating the winning form of the previous season. Going into the final round of Champions League group stage fixtures in December 2004, Halilhodžić's team still had a chance of advancing by beating CSKA Moscow at home. Even just a draw combined with group leaders Chelsea winning or drawing away at Porto would have ensured progress while a draw regardless of the other match outcome guaranteed at least a spot in the UEFA Cup round of 32. The club, however, suffered a disappointing 1–3 home defeat, courtesy of a Sergei Semak hat-trick, which meant straight elimination from Europe. It was a bitter loss that even prompted club president Francis Graille to publicly relay his disappointment at the "lack of pride" shown by the squad, though remaining guardedly coy when explicitly asked about Halilhodžić's future at the club.

PSG began the calendar year 2005 with only the domestic league to compete in. Sluggish form continued, however, and on 8 February 2005, following a 0–2 home defeat versus Lens that dropped PSG to 12th spot in the 2004–05 Ligue 1 table, the club's management decided to sack Halilhodžić. He was replaced by the coach of the reserves team, Laurent Fournier, under whom the club was knocked out of 2004–05 Coupe de France by Auxerre in March and eventually finished ninth in the league.

=== Trabzonspor ===
On 2 October 2005, Halilhodžić was signed by Turkish Süper Lig side Trabzonspor. Although he led the club to fourth place in the 2005–06 Süper Lig, just behind Istanbul's "Big Three", thus qualifying for the 2006–07 UEFA Cup, Halilhodžić decided to leave Turkey in June 2006 after just one season with the club.

=== Ivory Coast ===
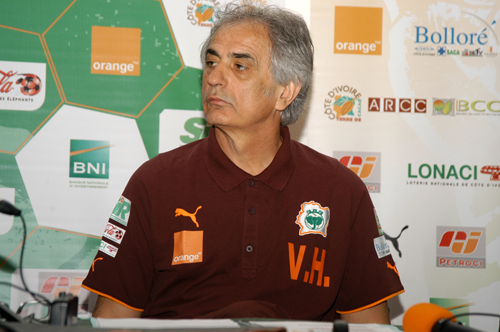
Halilhodžić as Ivory Coast manager in May 2008

In May 2008, Halilhodžić was appointed manager of the Ivory Coast national team featuring a number of established players from top European clubs; captained by Chelsea forward Didier Drogba and including the likes of FC Barcelona defensive midfielder Yaya Touré, Arsenal central defender Kolo Touré, Chelsea forward Salomon Kalou, Arsenal right back Emmanuel Eboué, and the young Le Mans left winger Gervinho.

In a two-year unbeaten run in African qualifiers, the team qualified for both the 2010 Africa Cup of Nations tournament in Angola and the 2010 FIFA World Cup in South Africa. In January 2010 in the quarter-finals of the continental championship against Algeria, however, the Ivory Coast were eliminated after Madjid Bougherra scored a 2–2 equaliser in injury time, with Hamer Bouazza adding Algeria's third goal in the opening minutes of extra time.

The defeat came as a huge disappointment for many Ivorians, for whom the national football team played a central social role and a source of national pride and unity, especially as the country was recovering from the 2002–07 civil war and preparing for its first post-war elections in October that year. As a consequence, Halilhodžić was fired on 27 February 2010, less than four months before the 2010 World Cup finals tournament in South Africa.

=== Dinamo Zagreb ===
Back in Europe, Halilhodžić was announced as the new manager of Croatian champions Dinamo Zagreb on 16 August 2010, signing a two-and-a-half-year contract to take over from club legend Velimir Zajec who had been fired after the team's Champions League qualifying elimination on penalties by the Moldovan side Sheriff Tiraspol. Although failing to qualify for the Champions League under Zajec, Dinamo still had the Europa League to compete in, and incoming Halilhodžić was tasked with guiding the rest of the club's European campaign while being expected to continue their dominance in the national championship.

Club fans immediately took to Halilhodžić, as Dinamo started playing an attractive and more attacking style of football. At the start of the Europa League group stage, on 16 September 2010, exactly one month after signing on, he led Dinamo to a somewhat improbable 2–0 victory over favoured Spanish side Villarreal. Despite some encouraging results early in the competition, Dinamo eventually failed to progress past the group stage, losing the deciding match in December 2010 at home against Greek club PAOK. Despite the setback, Halilhodžić stayed on due to support of both the fans and club management.

In the 2010–11 Croatian First League, the club was a runaway leader without any real competition, managing to clinch the domestic league title months prior to season's end. Simultaneously, issues arose over the renegotiation of terms of Halilhodžić's contract and, on 6 May 2011 two matches short of the end of the season, he abruptly left the club following a vicious shouting incident with Dinamo's president Zdravko Mamić in the team dressing room at Maksimir during half-time of the league match versus Inter Zaprešić.

=== Algeria ===
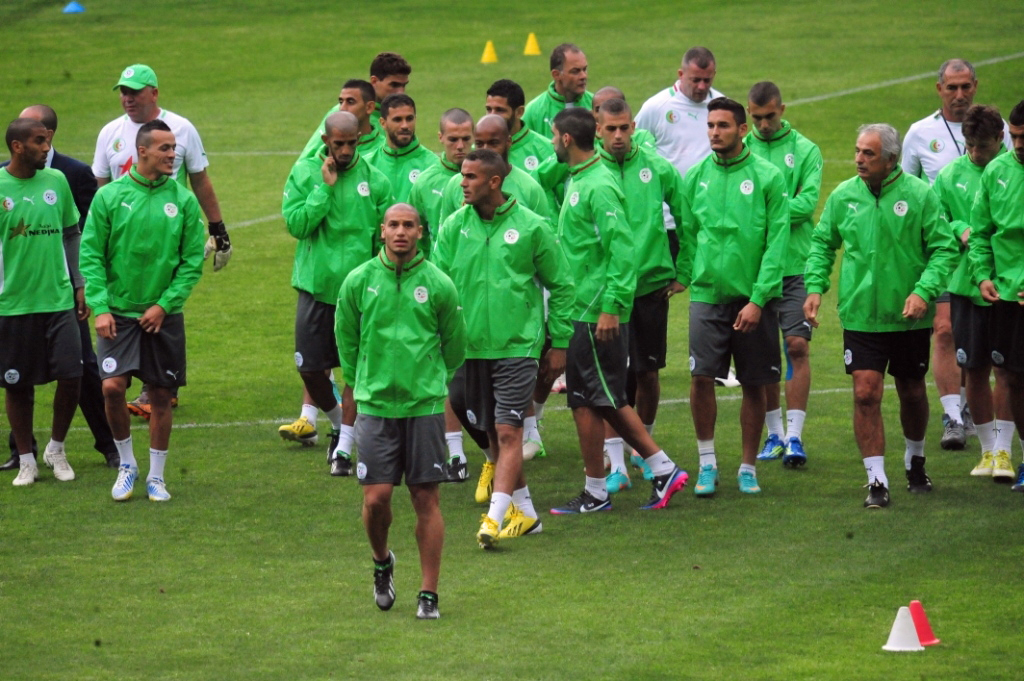
Algeria players training with Halilhodžić ahead of the 2013 Africa Cup of Nations

On 22 June 2011, the Algerian Football Federation announced that Halilhodžić would take over the vacant Algeria national team manager position starting on 1 July. On 2 July, the deal was made official with Halilhodžić signing a three-year contract. He successfully led Algeria through the 2013 Africa Cup of Nations qualification and in preparation for the finals tournament to be held in January 2013 in South Africa, the team invited Bosnia and Herzegovina (Halilhodžić's country of birth) for a friendly match in November 2012. Algeria lost 0–1 in injury time on a rainy night in Algiers.

Despite arriving at the final tournament with plenty of confidence and with the emergence of young stars Islam Slimani and El Arbi Hillel Soudani, as well as the addition to the squad of talented Valencia winger Sofiane Feghouli, Algeria finished bottom of their group, losing their opening two matches to Tunisia and Togo without scoring a single goal. Although the result was widely regarded as a disappointment, the Algerian Football Federation decided to keep Halilhodžić in charge and allow the team to gain more experience.

Now focusing on the 2014 World Cup qualifiers, Algeria under Halilhodžić secured a spot at the finals tournament on 19 November 2013 having beaten the 2013 Africa Cup of Nations runners-up Burkina Faso in a two-legged tie on away goals rule following a 3–3 aggregate score in the African qualifying play-offs. This was only the fourth time the country qualified for a World Cup in 32 years.

Algeria's performance at the 2014 World Cup in Brazil was a significant surprise as they beat South Korea 4–2 and drew with Russia 1–1 to progress past the group stage for the first time in the team's history. In the round of 16, Les Fennecs had to face a very strong Germany side. Although Algeria put up a very spirited resistance, they lost the game after a goalless 90 minutes, followed by extra time in which Germany scored twice through André Schürrle and Mesut Özil, with substitute Abdelmoumene Djabou pulling back one in the dying moments of the game to make it 1–2. Germany later went on to deliver a historic 7–1 thrashing of hosts Brazil and win their fourth World Cup title.

Despite the exit, Algeria's performance was the team's biggest success in history and Halilhodžić was frequently praised for his strategic counter-attacking tactics, calm yet motivating influence on the players, and skillful game management. Although he was offered a contract extension after the tournament, on 7 July 2014 he left the team.

=== Return to Trabzonspor ===
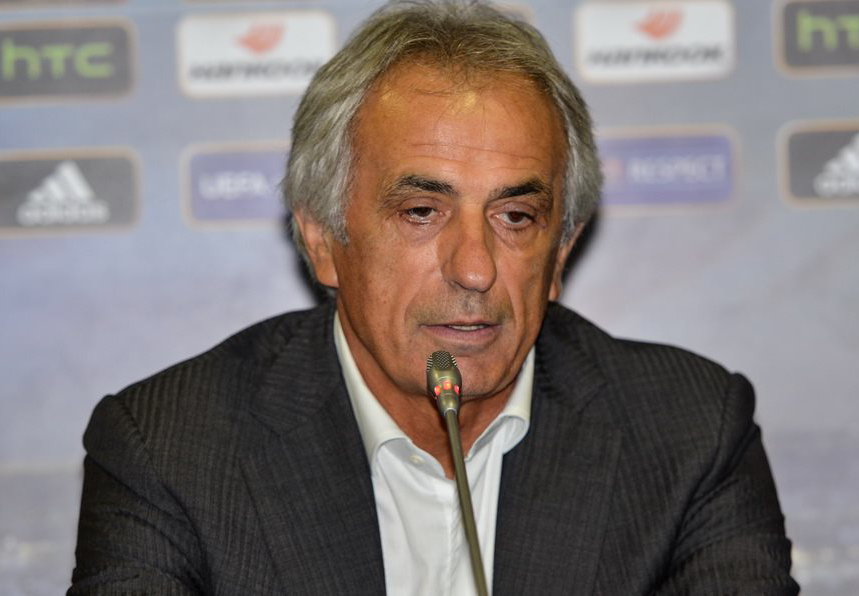
Halilhodžić at a press conference with Trabzonspor in 2014

In July 2014, Halilhodžić returned to Trabzonspor, signing a two-year contract. Under his management, the squad underwent significant changes, with nearly 20 new signings, including Óscar Cardozo, Mehmet Ekici, Kévin Constant, Waris, and Yatabare. Halilhodžić secured Trabzonspor a place in the 2014–15 UEFA Europa League group stage after eliminating Russian side Rostov in the play-off round, but was sacked in November after poor domestic results.

=== Japan ===
On 7 March 2015, in the wake of Halilhodžić being shortlisted for and eventually—following two November 2014 meetings with the Bosnian Football Association (FSBiH) representatives—rejecting the Bosnia and Herzegovina manager job offer, press reports appeared about Halilhodžić being set to take over as the Japan national team's new manager. He was officially appointed on 12 March 2015, thus replacing Javier Aguirre who had been sacked by the Japan Football Association (JFA) over his involvement in a 2011 match-fixing investigation in Spain.

In June 2016, Halilhodžić's Japan hosted Bosnia and Herzegovina in a Kirin Cup friendly, losing 1–2. In September 2016, the 2018 World Cup qualifying final round kicked off with six teams including Japan, Saudi Arabia and Australia fighting for two direct qualifying spots. In their opening match, Japan were unexpectedly beaten 1–2 by the UAE, a contest that featured a controversially disallowed Japanese goal. Nevertheless, the Japanese media raised a number of questions regarding Halilhodžić's squad selection.

Since then, media criticism of Halilhodžić's strategy and squad selection continued, and would follow him throughout his time at the job. He abandoned the decade-long Japanese traditional playing style of short passes, instead, he emphasized intense fighting for the ball (as he called it in French, "duel") and quick pace football. His most controversial decision was to drop Keisuke Honda (AC Milan), Shinji Kagawa (Dortmund) and Shinji Okazaki (Leicester). Another controversial call was to put Hotaru Yamaguchi, a player in the domestic second division, to his starting lineup.

Finishing the group with 6 wins, 2 draws, 2 losses with 7 conceded goals, Japan's performance was inconsistent, yet it secured crucial victories at critical moments to earn itself the top spot. The two critical moments was first, winning 2–1 against Saudi Arabia in November 2016 to end the first half of the group matches in the first place; second, beating Australia 2–0 in August 2017 to secure top spot and qualified to the 2018 FIFA World Cup. It is at these two moments the Japanese media temporarily admitted Halilhodžić is right on his strategy and his selection of squad. Yet they were called into questions once again after Japan's poor performance in the international friendlies in October and November against Haiti, Brazil and Belgium.

In December, Halilhodžić summoned his second and third team to 2017 East Asian Cup. Half of the team were uncapped. This unconventional inexperienced Japan team lost to South Korea 1–4. The Japanese media saw this as a humiliating defeat. Without realizing the Japan–South Korea football rivalry, Halilhodžić comments "I was amazed by South Korea's explosiveness of power, technique and control of the game. South Korea dominated us in every way." His comments made himself under siege by the Japanese media for weeks. Halilhodžić was dismissed in early April 2018, following friendlies with non-World Cup teams—last minute draw with Mali and 1–2 loss to Ukraine, with former international Akira Nishino named the new head coach. At a news conference, JFA President Kozo Tashima told reporters that poor results and a lack of "communication and trust with the players" were the reasons for Halilhodžić's dismissal.

Halilhodžić's spiky personality frequently ruffled feathers after arriving in Japan to take over from Javier Aguirre in March 2015, and rumors of his impending dismissal swirled throughout his three-year reign. Soon after Halilhodžić's dismissal, Japan's midfielder Keisuke Honda, who had had an increasingly fractious relationship with the Bosnian throughout 2017 over the head coach's rigid tactics, came out publicly against the fired coach by saying: "To submit myself to the kind of football Halilhodžić played in order to get picked, that would be shameful for me. I'm proud that I've stayed true to myself". On 24 May 2018, Halilhodžić launched a lawsuit in a Tokyo district court against the JFA president Kozo Tashima, contending he was dismissed wrongfully—specifically that Tashima failed to consult the JFA board when deciding to fire Halilhodžić.

In July 2018, Halilhodžić made a 4-man shortlist for the vacant Egyptian national team manager job alongside Quique Sánchez Flores, Jorge Luis Pinto, and Javier Aguirre. Aguirre ended up getting hired.

=== Nantes ===
In October 2018, Halilhodžić became the new manager of Nantes, a club he had played for as a striker. His first win came on 22 October when Nantes beat Toulouse 4–0 at the Stade de la Beaujoire.

On 5 May 2019, Nantes beat Dijon at home 3–0 and Halilhodžić made a club record, winning five Ligue 1 matches in a row, a venture which was not done in over 18 years in the club. Halilhodžić's Nantes beat Lyon, Paris Saint-Germain, Amiens, Marseille and at the end Dijon to capture that record.

On 2 August 2019, Halilhodžić decided to leave Nantes after disagreements with the club's owner and president Waldemar Kita.

=== Morocco ===
In August 2019, it was confirmed that Halilhodžić would take over as the Morocco national team's new manager. His first win came on 10 September when Morocco beat Niger 1–0 at the Stade de Marrakech. On 29 March 2022, Halilhodžić qualified Morocco for the 2022 World Cup, eliminating DR Congo in the CAF Third round qualifiers.

On 11 August 2022, Halilhodžić was officially sacked by the Royal Moroccan Football Federation over disagreements with its president on how the team should move forward. This marked the third time—the other two being Ivory Coast and Japan—Halilhodžić was sacked before a World Cup tournament after prior successful qualification.

=== Return to Nantes ===
On 10 March 2026, Halilhodžić rejoined relegation threatened Nantes until the end of the 2025–26 season. However, the club were relegated after finishing in the bottom two, returning to Ligue 2 for the first time since the 2012–13 season. Following their relegation, Nantes announced Halilhodžić would leave following the end of the season, however, he never got a farewell as Nantes' final match of the season versus Touslouse was vacated in the 22nd minute after hooded Nantes ultras stormed the pitch and threw flares.

== Personal life ==
During the Bosnian War in 1992, Halilhodžić was wounded in Mostar but recovered within a few months. He acquired French nationality by naturalization on 13 June 1997.

When visiting Mostar with a France 3 crew in 2001, he said:

It will never be the same as before. It's impossible. There are people with such hatred in their blood ... I could never imagine this, that people could possibly hate each other in such a way. ... For years, when I come here I stay for a day or two, and then I leave, because I can't. I become sick. [When I visit] It's 2-3 days, a little bit, to reconcile with myself.

On 23 July 2004, during his tenure as the manager of PSG, Halilhodžić was named a Knight of the Legion of Honour of the French Republic. Halilhodžić is married and has two children. His primary residence is in Lille, where his family lives.

He speaks Bosnian and French, the result of spending most of his time in France.

== Career statistics ==
=== International goals ===
Scores and results table. Yugoslavia's goal tally first.

| # | Date | Venue | Opponent | Score | Result | Competition |
|---|---|---|---|---|---|---|
| 1 | 4 October 1978 | Stadion Maksimir, Zagreb, Yugoslavia | Spain | 1–2 | 1–2 | UEFA Euro 1980 qualifying |
| 2 | 15 November 1978 | Gradski Stadion, Skopje, Yugoslavia | Greece | 1–1 | 4–1 | 1977-80 Balkan Cup |
| 3 | 15 November 1978 | Gradski Stadion, Skopje, Yugoslavia | Greece | 3–1 | 4–1 | 1977-80 Balkan Cup |
| 4 | 15 November 1978 | Gradski Stadion, Skopje, Yugoslavia | Greece | 4–1 | 4–1 | 1977-80 Balkan Cup |
| 5 | 25 March 1981 | Gradski Stadion, Subotica, Yugoslavia | Bulgaria | 1–0 | 2–1 | Friendly |
| 6 | 29 April 1981 | Stadion Poljud, Split, Yugoslavia | Greece | 2–0 | 5–1 | 1982 FIFA World Cup qualification |
| 7 | 21 November 1981 | Karađorđe Stadium, Novi Sad, Yugoslavia | Luxembourg | 1–0 | 5–0 | 1982 FIFA World Cup qualification |
| 8 | 21 November 1981 | Karađorđe Stadium, Novi Sad, Yugoslavia | Luxembourg | 2–0 | 5–0 | 1982 FIFA World Cup qualification |

== Managerial statistics ==
As of match played 8 May 2026

Managerial record by team and tenure
| Team | Nat | From | To | Record | | | | |
| Team | Nat | From | To | G | W | D | L | Win % |
|---|---|---|---|---|---|---|---|---|
| Beauvais | (France) | 1 July 1993 | 30 June 1994 | 44 | 11 | 19 | 14 | 25.00 |
| Raja Casablanca | (Morocco) | 1 October 1997 | 30 June 1998 | 45 | 28 | 14 | 3 | 62.22 |
| Lille | (France) | 1 September 1998 | 30 May 2002 | 160 | 80 | 40 | 40 | 50.00 |
| Rennes | (France) | 14 October 2002 | 30 June 2003 | 34 | 13 | 8 | 13 | 38.24 |
| Paris Saint-Germain | (France) | 1 July 2003 | 8 February 2005 | 80 | 37 | 24 | 19 | 46.25 |
| Trabzonspor | (Turkey) | 7 October 2005 | 30 May 2006 | 30 | 15 | 5 | 10 | 50.00 |
| Al-Ittihad | (Saudi Arabia) | 5 June 2006 | 1 August 2006 | 8 | 5 | 1 | 2 | 62.50 |
| Ivory Coast | (Ivory Coast) | 13 May 2008 | 27 February 2010 | 22 | 10 | 10 | 2 | 45.45 |
| Dinamo Zagreb | (Croatia) | 16 August 2010 | 24 May 2011 | 32 | 24 | 4 | 4 | 75.00 |
| Algeria | (Algeria) | 22 June 2011 | 7 July 2014 | 30 | 18 | 5 | 7 | 60.00 |
| Trabzonspor | (Turkey) | 15 July 2014 | 8 November 2014 | 12 | 3 | 7 | 2 | 25.00 |
| Japan | (Japan) | 12 March 2015 | 9 April 2018 | 38 | 21 | 9 | 8 | 55.26 |
| Nantes | (France) | 2 October 2018 | 2 August 2019 | 37 | 17 | 6 | 14 | 45.95 |
| Morocco | (Morocco) | 15 August 2019 | 11 August 2022 | 30 | 20 | 7 | 3 | 66.67 |
| Nantes | (France) | 10 March 2026 | 30 June 2026 | 8 | 1 | 3 | 4 | 12.50 |
| Career Total | | | | 610 | 303 | 162 | 145 | 49.67 |

== Honours ==
=== Player ===
Velež Mostar

- Yugoslav Cup: 1980–81

Nantes

- Division 1: 1982–83

Yugoslavia U21

- UEFA European Under-21 Championship: 1978

Individual

- UEFA European Under-21 Championship Golden Player: 1978
- Ligue 1 Foreign Player of the Year: 1984, 1985

=== Manager ===
Raja Casablanca

- CAF Champions League: 1997
- Botola: 1997–98
- CAF Super Cup runner-up: 1998

Lille

- Division 2: 1999–2000

Paris Saint-Germain

- Coupe de France: 2003–04

Dinamo Zagreb

- 1. HNL: 2010–11

Individual

- Division 2 Trainer of the Year: 1999
- French Manager of the Year: 2001

=== Orders ===
- Knight of the Legion of Honour: 2004

== See also ==
- National team managers with 100 or more matches
