= Thierry Tusseau =

French footballer (born 1958)

Personal information
- Date of birth: 19 January 1958 (age 68)
- Place of birth: Nogent-sur-Marne, France
- Height: 1.75 m (5 ft 9 in)
- Position: Left back

Senior career*
Years	Team	Apps	(Gls)
1975–1983	Nantes	237	(12)
1983–1986	Bordeaux	92	(3)
1986–1988	RC Paris	49	(1)
1988–1991	Reims	88	(2)
Total		466	(18)

International career
1977–1986	France	22	(0)
Medal record
Representing France
UEFA European Championship
Winner	1984 France
CONMEBOL–UEFA Cup of Champions
Winner	1985 France
- * Club domestic league appearances and goals

Thierry Tusseau (born 19 January 1958) is a French former professional footballer who played as a defender. As a player of French side Bordeaux (1983–1986), he was a member of the France national team in the 1986 FIFA World Cup and the team that won the European Championship in 1984.

== Club career ==
Tusseau was born in Nogent-sur-Marne, Val-de-Marne. Throughout his career, he played for Nantes (1977–1983), Bordeaux (1983–1986), RC Paris (1986–1987), Matra Racing (1987–1988), and Reims (1988–1991).

== International career ==
Tusseau was a member of the France national team that won the 1984 European Championship on home soil and also later took part at the 1986 FIFA World Cup with France. In total, he earned 22 international caps (no goals) for the France national team during the 1970s and 1980s.
