= Loïc Amisse =

French footballer (born 1954)

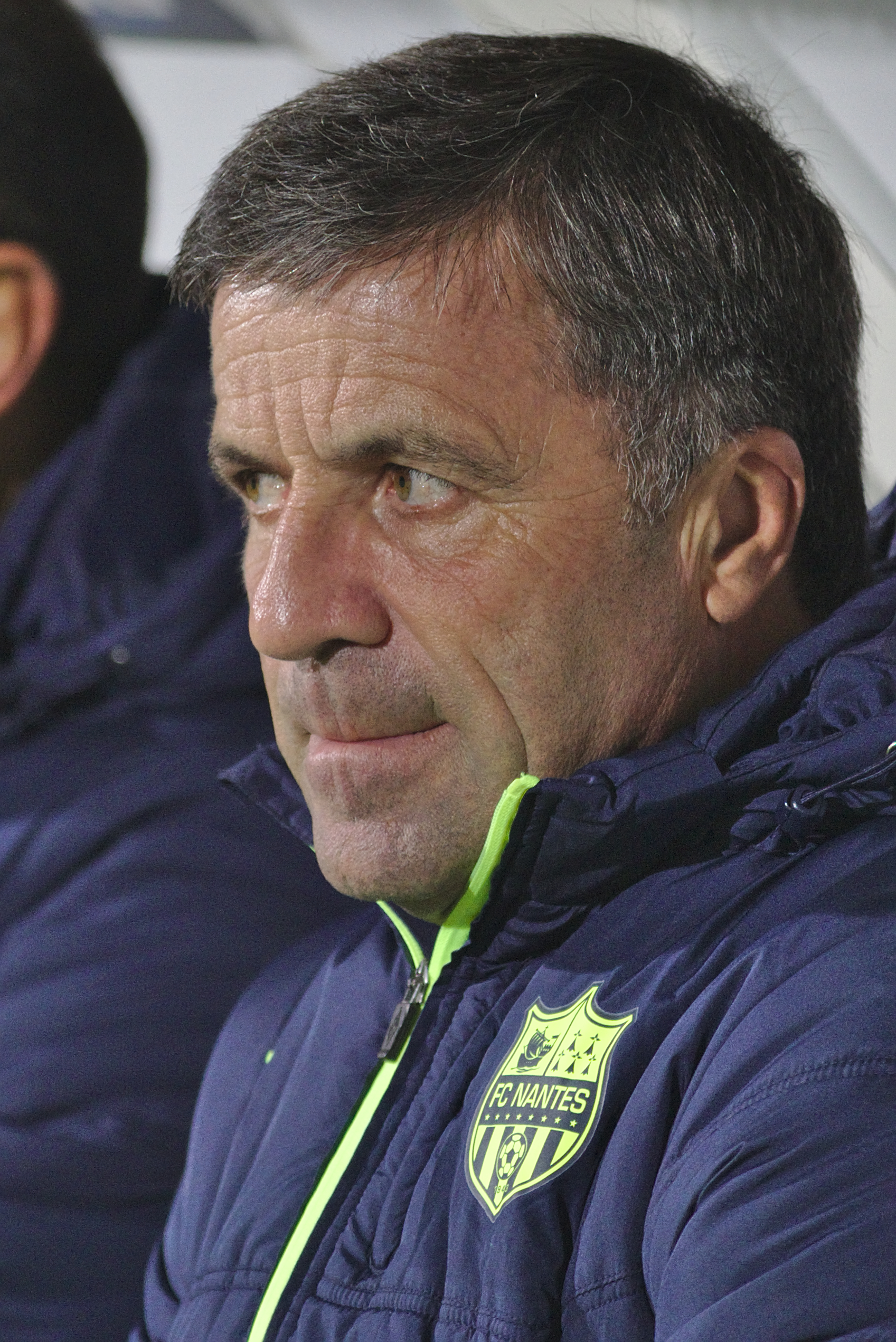
- Amisse with Nantes in 2015

Personal information
- Date of birth: 9 August 1954 (age 72)
- Place of birth: Nantes, France
- Position: Winger

Senior career*
Years	Team	Apps	(Gls)
1973–1990	Nantes	503	(86)
1990–1991	Angers		

International career
1977–1983	France	12	(2)

Managerial career
- 2003–2004: Nantes
- * Club domestic league appearances and goals

Loïc Amisse (born 9 August 1954) is a French football manager and former professional player who played as a winger.

== Career statistics ==
=== International ===
Appearances and goals by national team and year
National team	Year	Apps	Goals
France	1977	2	0
France	1978	2	0
France	1979	5	2
France	1980	1	0
France	1981	–	
France	1982	–	
France	1983	2	0
Total		12	2

Scores and results list France's goal tally first, score column indicates score after each Amisse goal.

List of international goals scored by Loïc Amisse
No.	Date	Venue	Opponent	Score	Result	Competition	Ref.
1	7 May 1979	Giants Stadium, East Rutherford, United States	United States	5–0	6–0	Friendly	
2	10 October 1979	Parc des Princes, Paris, France	United States	3–0	3–0	Friendly	
