= Bruno Baronchelli =

French footballer (born 1957)

Personal information
- Date of birth: 13 January 1957 (age 69)
- Place of birth: Tours, France
- Position: Winger

Youth career
- –1973: Saint-Pierre des Corps
- 1973–1975: Nantes

Senior career*
| Years | Team | Apps | (Gls) |
| 1975–1987 | Nantes | | |
| 1987–1990 | Le Havre | | |

International career
| 1977–1981 | France | 6 | (1) |

Managerial career
- 2000: Le Havre (caretaker)
- 2001–2002: Lille OSC (caretaker)
- * Club domestic league appearances and goals

Bruno Baronchelli (born 13 January 1957) is a former professional French football winger.
