= 1982–83 Coupe de France =

Tournament details
- Country: France

The Coupe de France 1982–83 was its 66th edition. It was won by Paris SG which defeated FC Nantes in the Final.

== Round of 16 ==
Team 1	Agg.	Team 2	1st leg	2nd leg
Girondins de Bordeaux (D1)	0–4	FC Nantes (D1)	0–0	0–4
RC Strasbourg (D1)	2–7	Paris SG (D1)	0–2	2–5
Stade Brestois (D1)	4–2	AS Monaco (D1)	4–1	0–1
FC Rouen (D1)	2–1	Toulouse FC (D1)	2–1	0–0
Tours FC (D1)	4–3	Olympique Lyonnais (D2)	2–0	2–3
Stade Lavallois (D1)	0–0 (2–4 p)	En Avant Guingamp (D2)	0–0	0–0 (a.e.t.)
FC Martigues (D2)	2–3	Lille OSC (D1)	2–1	0–2
RC Paris (D2)	3–1	Gazélec Ajaccio (D3)	3–0	0–1

== Quarter-finals ==
Team 1	Agg.	Team 2	1st leg	2nd leg
RC Paris (D2)	2–3	FC Nantes (D1)	2–2	0–1
Stade Brestois (D1)	2–3	Paris SG (D1)	2–1	0–2
En Avant Guingamp (D2)	2–4	Tours FC (D1)	1–1	1–3
Lille OSC (D1)	2–1	FC Rouen (D1)	2–0	0–1

== Semi-finals ==
=== First leg ===
27 May 1983

Paris Saint-Germain (1)	4–0	Tours (1)
Fernandez 5'; Sušić 9', 84'; Pilorget 33'

Parc des Princes, Paris
Attendance: 22,000
Referee: Jean-Marie Lartigot

27 May 1983

Lille (1)	0–1	Nantes (1)
		Amisse 24'

Stade Grimonprez-Jooris, Lille
Attendance: 25,000
Referee: Robert Wurtz

=== Second leg ===
7 June 1983

Tours (1)	3–3	Paris Saint-Germain (1)
Lorenzo 5'; Polaniok 35'; Da Fonseca 66'		Sušić 11'; Toko 24'; Sarr 28'

Stade de la Vallée du Cher, Tours
Attendance: 9,917
Referee: Alain Delmer

Paris Saint-Germain won 7–3 on aggregate.

7 June 1983

Nantes (1)	1–1	Lille (1)
Amisse 69'		Marsiglia 72'

Stade Marcel-Saupin, Nantes
Attendance: 20,000
Referee: Georges Konrath

Nantes won 2–1 on aggregate.

== Final ==
11 June 1983

Paris Saint-Germain	3–2	Nantes
Zaremba 3'; Sušić 65'; Toko 82'		Baronchelli 17'; Touré 40'

Parc des Princes, Paris
Attendance: 46,203
Referee: Michel Vautrot
