= 1982–83 French Division 1 =

45th season of French Division 1

Division 1
- Season: 1982–83
- Champions: Nantes (6th title)
- Relegated: Tours; Lyon; Mulhouse
- European Cup: Nantes
- Cup Winners' Cup: Paris Saint-Germain
- UEFA Cup: Bordeaux; Lens; Laval
- Matches: 380
- Goals: 1,090 (2.87 per match)
- Top goalscorer: Vahid Halilhodžić (27)

FC Nantes won Division 1 season 1982/1983 of the French Association Football League with 58 points.

== Participating teams ==
- Auxerre
- SEC Bastia
- Bordeaux
- Stade Brest
- Stade Lavallois
- RC Lens
- Lille
- Olympique Lyonnais
- FC Metz
- AS Monaco
- FC Mulhouse
- AS Nancy
- FC Nantes Atlantique
- Paris Saint-Germain FC
- FC Rouen
- AS Saint-Etienne
- FC Sochaux
- RC Strasbourg
- Toulouse FC
- FC Tours
Location of teams in 1982–83 Division 1

== League table ==
Pos	Team	Pld	W	D	L	GF	GA	GD	Pts	Qualification or relegation
1	Nantes (C)	38	24	10	4	77	29	+48	58	Qualification to European Cup first round
2	Bordeaux	38	20	8	10	67	48	+19	48	Qualification to UEFA Cup first round
3	Paris Saint-Germain	38	20	7	11	66	49	+17	47	Qualification to Cup Winners' Cup first round (Note: Paris Saint-Germain qualified for the 1983–84 European Cup Winners' Cup as winners of the 1982–83 Coupe de France.)
4	Lens	38	18	8	12	64	55	+9	44	Qualification to UEFA Cup first round
5	Laval	38	15	14	9	42	41	+1	44	Qualification to UEFA Cup first round
6	Monaco	38	14	15	9	55	35	+20	43	
7	Nancy	38	17	7	14	74	61	+13	41	
8	Auxerre	38	12	14	12	56	48	+8	38	
9	Metz	38	13	11	14	66	67	−1	37	
10	Brest	38	11	15	12	53	63	−10	37	
11	Toulouse	38	15	6	17	52	66	−14	36	
12	Sochaux	38	9	17	12	52	53	−1	35	
13	Lille	38	13	8	17	38	45	−7	34	
14	Saint-Étienne	38	11	12	15	41	52	−11	34	
15	Strasbourg	38	11	11	16	40	51	−11	33	
16	Rouen	38	11	10	17	45	54	−9	32	
17	Bastia	38	9	14	15	41	52	−11	32	
18	Tours (R)	38	12	7	19	58	68	−10	31	Qualification to relegation play-offs
19	Lyon (R)	38	11	6	21	57	77	−20	28	Relegation to French Division 2
20	Mulhouse (R)	38	10	8	20	46	76	−30	28	Relegation to French Division 2

Source: Histoire du PSG
Rules for classification: 1) points; 2) goal difference; 3) number of goals scored.
Victory: 2 points, Draw: 1 point, Defeat: 0 points
(C) Champions; (R) Relegated
Notes:

Promoted from Division 2, who will play in Division 1 season 1983/1984

- Stade Rennais:Champion of Division 2, winner of Division 2 group A
- Sporting Toulon Var:Runner-up, winner of Division 2 group B
- Nîmes Olympique:Third place, winner of barrages against FC Tours

== Results ==
Home \ Away	AUX	BAS	BOR	BRS	LVL	RCL	LIL	OL	MET	ASM	MUL	NAL	NAN	PSG	ROU	STE	SOC	RCS	TFC	TOU
Auxerre		1–1	2–2	4–2	0–1	0–0	3–0	3–1	2–2	1–0	2–1	2–3	1–1	3–2	2–0	4–1	2–2	0–0	5–1	3–1
Bastia	1–0		1–2	1–1	1–1	4–0	0–0	2–1	0–3	2–0	2–0	3–2	1–1	1–1	0–0	2–1	0–0	1–1	1–1	4–1
Bordeaux	3–0	0–0		0–0	4–1	3–0	2–0	5–1	2–0	3–1	2–0	3–2	1–2	2–1	3–2	1–1	3–1	1–1	1–0	1–0
Brest	2–2	4–2	0–1		3–0	2–1	0–1	2–1	1–1	1–1	4–0	0–3	1–1	3–1	4–2	4–2	2–2	1–0	2–2	4–2
Laval	1–0	1–0	2–0	1–1		0–0	2–0	1–1	2–1	1–0	0–0	0–0	1–3	1–0	3–1	0–0	3–1	2–1	2–1	3–0
Lens	0–0	2–1	2–2	2–3	2–0		2–0	1–0	4–2	2–0	4–2	2–1	2–2	4–0	2–0	4–2	3–0	2–1	3–1	2–1
Lille	1–2	2–0	2–1	4–0	0–0	1–1		1–0	1–1	1–1	4–0	2–0	0–2	1–0	5–0	1–1	1–0	1–0	3–0	2–0
Lyon	1–1	3–1	3–5	2–0	2–0	2–1	3–1		3–3	1–1	7–3	1–2	1–2	1–3	0–4	2–1	3–1	4–2	4–1	2–0
Metz	1–1	0–0	2–1	1–0	3–2	2–1	2–0	4–1		1–1	3–0	2–3	0–4	1–2	3–2	1–1	1–1	1–1	3–2	5–1
Monaco	1–1	3–0	3–1	5–0	4–1	2–1	0–0	3–0	2–1		1–0	1–0	2–2	1–1	2–0	2–2	0–0	3–0	0–0	3–0
Mulhouse	3–2	4–1	4–4	1–1	2–1	1–3	1–0	1–1	3–4	2–1		3–1	1–1	1–1	0–0	1–0	1–0	2–0	1–2	1–0
Nancy	3–1	2–2	2–1	1–1	1–1	1–2	2–2	5–2	4–0	2–1	6–0		2–2	2–3	2–0	3–1	1–2	2–1	1–2	3–3
Nantes	1–0	3–0	4–0	5–1	0–0	5–1	1–0	1–0	2–3	0–0	2–1	3–1		2–0	1–0	4–2	4–0	3–0	3–0	2–1
Paris SG	0–0	1–0	2–0	2–0	0–0	4–3	4–1	3–0	3–1	0–1	5–1	2–3	2–1		1–0	4–1	1–0	4–3	2–1	4–2
Rouen	1–1	2–1	2–1	1–1	2–2	1–1	2–0	2–1	0–0	1–1	4–2	1–0	1–0	0–1		0–1	1–1	2–1	3–0	4–2
Saint-Étienne	1–0	1–1	3–1	0–0	1–1	0–1	1–0	1–0	3–1	2–0	1–0	3–4	0–1	1–1	1–0		0–1	0–0	2–1	0–0
Sochaux	2–0	2–1	0–2	4–0	1–1	1–1	2–0	1–1	4–3	1–1	1–1	0–1	1–1	1–2	2–2	3–0		2–2	2–3	1–1
Strasbourg	0–2	2–1	0–0	0–0	1–2	2–1	1–0	2–0	2–1	0–4	2–1	2–0	2–0	1–1	1–0	2–0	1–1		3–0	1–1
Toulouse	2–1	3–1	0–1	2–2	0–1	1–0	3–0	4–1	2–1	2–1	2–1	2–1	0–1	2–1	2–1	1–1	2–6	3–1		1–1
Tours	3–2	0–1	1–2	2–0	4–1	5–1	5–0	3–0	3–2	2–2	1–0	1–2	0–4	3–1	3–1	0–2	1–1	2–0	2–0	

Legend: Blue = home team win; Yellow = draw; Red = away team win.

== Relegation play-offs ==
Team 1	Agg.	Team 2	1st leg	2nd leg
Tours	2–4	Nîmes	1–1	1–3

== Season statistics ==
=== Top goalscorers ===
Rank	Player	Club	Goals
1	(Socialist Federal Republic of Yugoslavia) Vahid Halilhodžić	Nantes	27
2	(Poland) Andrzej Szarmach	Auxerre	24
3	(Morocco) Abdelkrim Merry Krimau	Metz	23
4	(France) Bernard Lacombe	Bordeaux	20
5	(France) Jean-François Beltramini	Rouen	19
6	(West Germany) Dieter Müller	Bordeaux	17
6	(Socialist Federal Republic of Yugoslavia) Tony Kurbos	Metz	17
8	(France) Yannick Stopyra	Sochaux	16
9	(France) Jean-Marc Ferreri	Auxerre	14
9	(West Germany) Uwe Krause	Laval	14
9	(France) Thierry Meyer	Nancy	14
9	(France) Daniel Xuereb	Lens	14

== Attendances ==
#	Club	Average
1	PSG	23,928
2	Lens	19,472
3	Nantes	16,711
4	Toulouse	15,847
5	Girondins	15,562
6	Rouen	12,879
7	Saint-Étienne	11,475
8	Tours	10,987
9	Brest	10,352
10	Lyon	9,990
11	Metz	9,317
12	Nancy	9,047
13	Stade lavallois	8,417
14	LOSC	8,415
15	AJA	8,333
16	Mulhouse	8,077
17	Strasbourg	6,349
18	Sochaux	5,239
19	Bastia	3,925
20	Monaco	3,394
