= 1979 Coupe de France final =

- Event: 1978–79 Coupe de France
| Nantes | Auxerre |
| 4 | 1 |
- Date: 16 June 1979
- Venue: Parc des Princes, Paris
- Referee: Michel Vautrot
- Attendance: 46,070

The 1979 Coupe de France final was a football match held at Parc des Princes, Paris on 16 June 1979 that saw FC Nantes defeat AJ Auxerre of Division 2 4–1 thanks to goals by Eric Pécout and Oscar Muller.

== Match details ==
16 June 1979

| Nantes | 4–1 | Auxerre |
|---|---|---|
| Pécout 11', 104', 120'; Muller 113' | | Mésones 49' |

Parc des Princes, Paris
Attendance: 46,070
Referee: Michel Vautrot

GK
DF
DF
DF
DF
MF
MF
MF
FW
FW
FW
Substitutes:
MF
DF
Manager:
(France) Jean Vincent Assistant Referees: Fourth Official:

(France) Jean-Paul Bertrand-Demanes
(France) Maxime Bossis
(France) Thierry Tusseau
(France) Patrice Rio | (substituted off) 85'
(France) Henri Michel | (c)
(France) Omar Sahnoun
(Argentina) Victor Trossero | (substituted off) 61'
(Argentina) Oscar Muller
(France) Eric Pécout
(France) Gilles Rampillon
(France) Loïc Amisse
(France) Bruno Baronchelli | (substituted in) 61'
(France) Raynald Denoueix | (substituted in) 78'

GK
DF
DF
DF
DF
MF
MF
MF
FW
FW
FW
Substitutes:
FW
MF
Manager:
(France) Guy Roux

(Poland) Maryan Szeja
(France) Lucien Denis
(France) Olivier Borel
(France) Christian Roque
(France) Jean-Paul Noël
(France) Dominique Cuperly
(France) Serge Mesonès | (c)
(France) Paul Brot
(Poland) Josef Klose
(France) Jean-Marc Schaer | (substituted off) 78'
(France) Philippe Delancray | (substituted off) 106'
(France) André Truffaut | (substituted in) 78'
(France) Gérard Hallet | (substituted in) 106'

== See also ==
- Coupe de France 1978-79
