= Michel Der Zakarian =

Armenian footballer (born 1963)

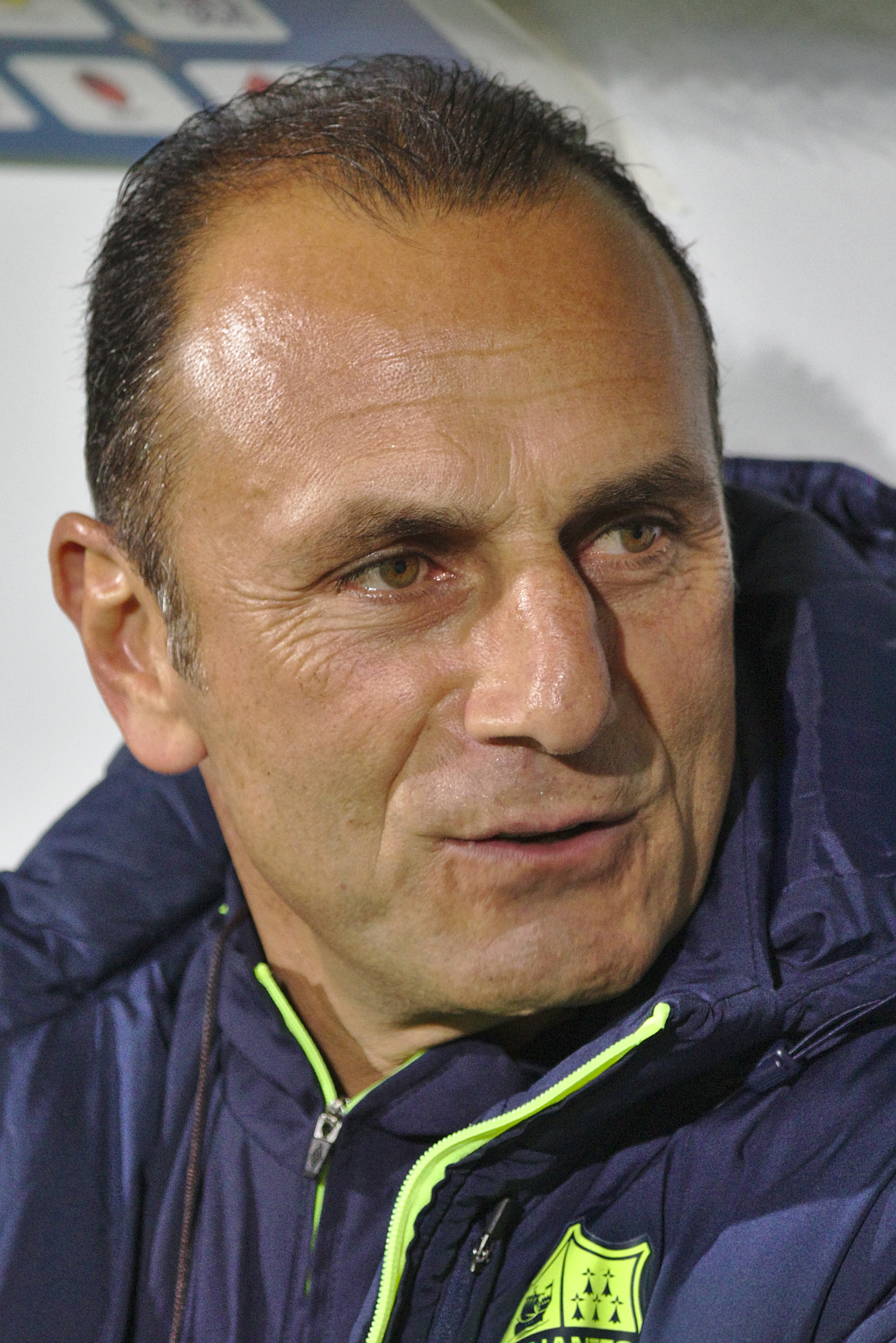
- Der Zakarian as Nantes coach in 2015

Personal information
- Full name: Michel Der Zakarian
- Date of birth: 18 February 1963 (age 63)
- Place of birth: Yerevan, Armenian SSR, Soviet Union
- Height: 1.80 m (5 ft 11 in)
- Position: Defender

Youth career
- 1969–1974: Vivaux Maronniers
- 1974–1979: Mazargues

Senior career*
| Years | Team | Apps | (Gls) |
| 1979–1988 | Nantes | 140 | (1) |
| 1988–1998 | Montpellier | 233 | (15) |
| Total | | 373 | (16) |

International career
| 1996–1997 | Armenia | 5 | (0) |

Managerial career
- 1998–1999: Montpellier C
- 2006: Nantes B
- 2007–2008: Nantes
- 2009–2012: Clermont
- 2012–2016: Nantes
- 2016–2017: Reims
- 2017–2021: Montpellier
- 2021–2022: Brest
- 2023–2024: Montpellier
- 2025: Caen
- 2026: Nantes
- * Club domestic league appearances and goals

Michel Der Zakarian (Armenian: Միշել Տեր-Զաքարյան, born on 18 February 1963) is an Armenian professional football coach and former player who played as a defender, who was most recently the head coach of Nantes.

Raised in France, he played for Nantes and Montpellier, and earned five caps for the Armenia national team in the mid-1990s. As a coach, he led Nantes, Montpellier (two spells each) and Brest in Ligue 1, and Clermont, Reims, and Caen in Ligue 2.

== Playing career ==
Der Zakarian was born in Yerevan and moved with his family to Marseille in the south of France at an young age. and spent his entire professional career in the country with Nantes and Montpellier, winning the league with the former in 1983. He was a member of the Armenia national team, participating in five international matches after his debut in a home 1998 World Cup qualifying match against Portugal.

== Managerial career ==
=== Nantes and Clermont ===
Der Zakarian was assistant to Georges Eo at Nantes, and succeeded him on 12 February 2007 when the team was 19th in Ligue 1; this was their fifth change of the position since winning the league title in 2001. The Canaris were relegated, and he brought them back immediately from Ligue 2 as runners up to Le Havre, but was sacked on 26 August 2008 after gaining one point from the first three games of the season, and was replaced by Christian Larièpe, who became the interim manager.

On 1 June 2009, Der Zakarian succeeded Didier Ollé-Nicolle at Ligue 2 club Clermont. Despite the club having one of the lowest budgets in the league, he led them to respective finishes of 6th, 7th and 5th in his three seasons before returning to Nantes.

In 2012–13, his first season back at the Stade de la Beaujoire, Der Zakarian again won Nantes promotion to Ligue 1, in third place. He kept them in the top flight in each of the following three seasons, though goals were hard to come by; they netted 38, 29 and 33 respectively over the 38-game campaigns. Club owner Waldemar Kita disliked Der Zakarian and his management, but allowed him to see out his contract instead of paying for a dismissal.

=== Reims and Montpellier ===
Der Zakarian left Nantes in May 2016 to sign for two years at Reims, newly relegated to Ligue 2. A year later, he was back in the top flight after leaving by mutual accord to join Montpellier.

In April 2019, Der Zakarian signed a new contract to stay at Montpellier until 2021. The club ended that season in 6th, missing out on UEFA Europa League qualification only due to the results of the domestic cup finals.

Der Zakarian announced in May 2021 that he was leaving Montpellier at the end of the season. He won 2–1 against former club Nantes on his final day, securing 8th place.

=== Brest ===
On 22 June 2021, Der Zakarian signed with fellow Ligue 1 side Brest. The team did not win any of their first eleven games, followed by six successive victories including over Monaco and Marseille. Having stayed up in his first season, his contract was automatically extended to 2024.

Der Zakarian was fired on 11 October 2022 with the club in last place, having won once in ten games. Results that season included a 7–0 home loss to Montpellier on 28 August.

=== Return to Montpellier ===
On 8 February 2023, Der Zakarian returned as manager of Montpellier. On 24 October 2023, he was involved in an altercation with defender Mamadou Sakho, who reportedly grabbed him by the collar before the manager fell to the floor; it is alleged that Sakho was provoked by Der Zakarian calling him a "cry-baby" over a training ground incident.

After having conceded 26 goals in 8 games, ending with a 5–0 defeat to Marseille, Der Zakarian was sacked from last-placed Montpellier on 20 October 2024.

=== Caen ===
On 18 February 2025, Der Zakarian signed with Ligue 2 side Caen. He left the club at the end of the season, having been relegated to the Championnat National.

== Personal life ==
Der Zakarian and his wife Véronique married in 1983.

== Managerial statistics ==
As of match played 22 August 2026

Managerial record by team and tenure
| Team | From | To | Record | | | | | Ref. |
| Team | From | To | G | W | D | L | Win % | Ref. |
|---|---|---|---|---|---|---|---|---|
| Nantes B | 30 June 2006 | 20 September 2006 | 7 | 1 | 3 | 3 | 14.29 | |
| Nantes | 12 February 2007 | 26 August 2008 | 63 | 26 | 20 | 17 | 41.27 | |
| Clermont | 1 July 2009 | 30 May 2012 | 130 | 50 | 41 | 39 | 38.46 | |
| Nantes | 31 May 2012 | 15 May 2016 | 173 | 67 | 47 | 59 | 38.73 | |
| Reims | 23 May 2016 | 23 May 2017 | 42 | 16 | 13 | 13 | 38.10 | |
| Montpellier | 23 May 2017 | 30 June 2021 | 161 | 62 | 54 | 45 | 38.51 | |
| Brest | 1 July 2021 | 11 October 2022 | 51 | 15 | 13 | 23 | 29.41 | |
| Montpellier | 8 February 2023 | 20 October 2024 | 61 | 22 | 16 | 23 | 36.07 | |
| Caen | 18 February 2025 | 10 May 2025 | 11 | 1 | 4 | 6 | 9.09 | |
| Nantes | 17 June 2026 | 24 August 2026 | 3 | 0 | 0 | 3 | 0.00 | |
| Total | | | 702 | 260 | 211 | 231 | 37.04 | — |

== Honours ==
Nantes

- Ligue 1: 1982–83
- Coupe de France runners-up: 1982–83

Montpellier

- Coupe de France: 1989–90; runners-up: 1993–94
- Coupe de la Ligue: 1991–92; runners-up: 1993–94
