= 1969 Campeonato Metropolitano final =

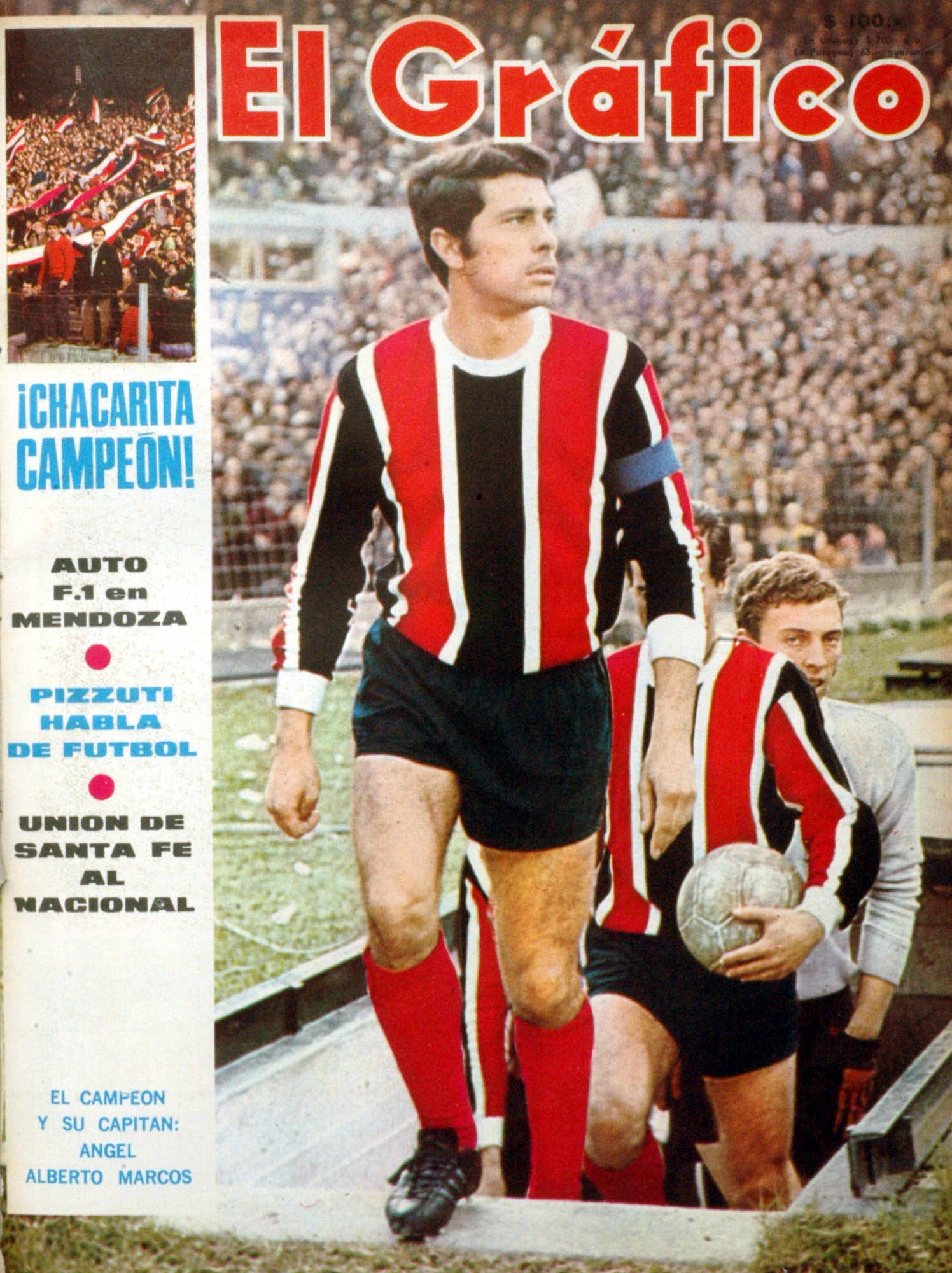
- Champions Chacarita Juniors covered on El Gráfico
- Event: 1969 Campeonato Metropolitano
Chacarita Juniors	River Plate
4	1
- Date: 6 July 1969
- Venue: Racing Club Stadium, Avellaneda
- Referee: Roberto Barreiro
- Attendance: 64,441

The 1969 Campeonato Metropolitano final was the final match of the 1969 Campeonato Metropolitano, the first of the two league championships held during the 78th season of the Argentine Primera División. The match was contested between Chacarita Juniors (who played their first Primera División final) and River Plate (contesting their 3rd final).

The match was held in a neutral venue, in this case the Racing Club Stadium in Avellaneda, on 6 July 1969.

Chacarita defeated River 4–1 to win their 1st. (and only to date) title in the upper division of Argentine football.

== Background ==
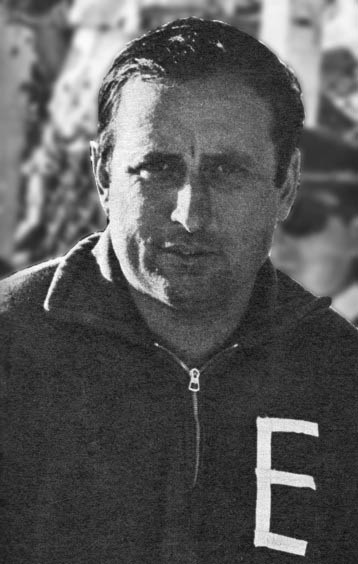
Argentino Geronazzo is regarded as "the builder" of the Chacarita champion team

Having started his tenure as manager in 1968, Argentino Geronazzo is regarded as the main responsible in the success of that team. After arriving at the club he made changes to the squad, shifting the positions of several players who would later prove crucial. Geronazzo is regarded as an innovative, restless, and tactical coach, and one of the first to spy on rivals.

Most of their players emerged from the youth divisions plus the addition of Abel Pérez (from Boca Juniors), Rodolfo Orife from Estudiantes de La Plata, and Juan C. Puntonero from Newell's Old Boys.

Federico Pizarro then replaced Geronazzo; however, he maintained the team's system and style of play. Thus, without what many would consider star players, but with a collective focused team, Chacarita Juniors began to earn points in the 1969 Metropolitano and ended up sharing the first position in their group with Boca Juniors.

Before the semifinal v Racing, Pizarro resigned due to a disagreement with the Chacarita executive committee, being replaced by Víctor Rodríguez, who was the manager in two last matches of the tournament.

== Qualified teams ==
Team	Previous app.
Chacarita Juniors	(none)
River Plate	**1932**, **1936**

- Bold: indicates winning years
- Met: Campeonato Metropolitano
- Nac: Campeonato Nacional

=== Venue ===
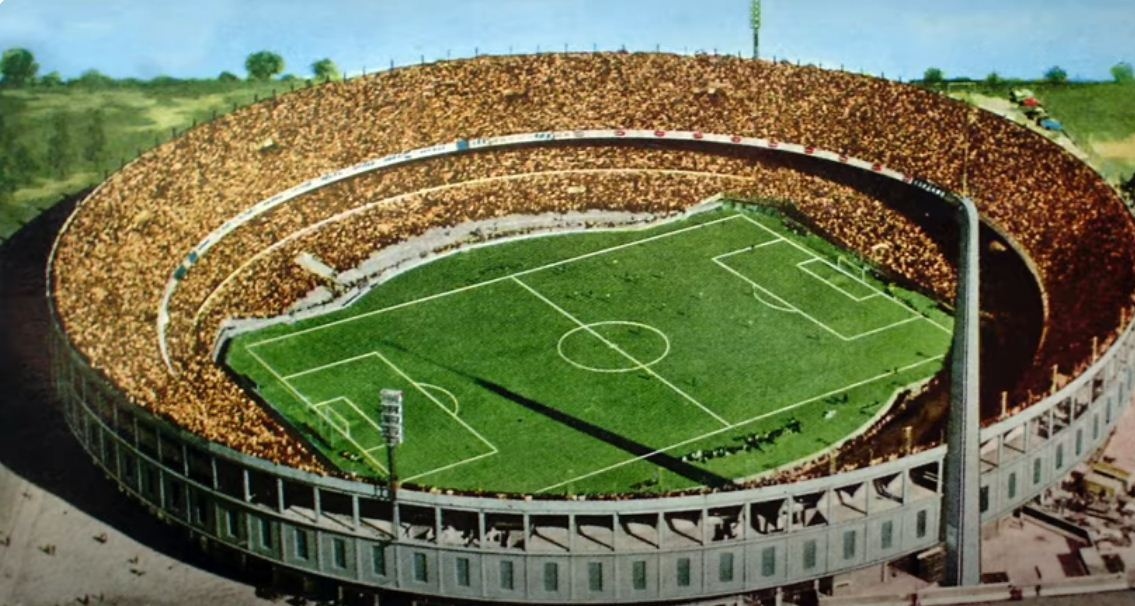
Racing Club Stadium, venue

The match was held in Estadio Presidente Perón, owned by Racing Club de Avellaneda. The stadium had been officially inaugurated in September 1950. The following year, it was selected as the main venue for the 1951 Pan American Games, hosting the opening ceremony and all football matches.

On 1 November 1967, the stadium hosted the second leg of the 1967 Intercontinental Cup, where Racing defeated Celtic 2–1. The match drew approximately 120,000 spectators, marking the highest attendance ever recorded at a stadium in Argentina.

== Road to the final ==
Participant teams were divided into two groups of 11 teams each. They played a double round-robin tournament plus two derbies (vs Platense and Boca Juniors in the cases of Chacarita and River, respectively) totalising 22 matches played.

The first two teams of each zone qualified to the semifinals, which (just like the final) were decided on one single match and held in neutral venues.

Chacarita Juniors			Round	River Plate		
Opponent	Result (home / away)		Group stage	Opponent	Result (home / away)	
Platense (Note: Inter-zonal match, usually a "derby day".)	2–1 (A)	3–2 (H)	Matchday 1	Argentinos Juniors	2–1 (A)	4–2 (H)
Lanús	1–7 (A)	3–0 (H)	Matchday 2	Boca Juniors	1–1 (A)	2–0 (H)
Colón	5–0 (H)	1–0 (A)	Matchday 3	Los Andes	1–0 (H)	0–0 (A)
Vélez Sarsfield	2–2 (A)	2–1 (H)	Matchday 4	Newell's Old Boys	2–1 (A)	4–0 (H)
Independiente	1–0 (H)	1–2 (A)	Matchday 5	Estudiantes LP	3–1 (H)	0–1 (A)
Atlanta	1–1 (A)	2–1 (H)	Matchday 6	Huracán	1–0 (A)	0–0 (H)
Boca Juniors	0–0 (H)	1–0 (A)	Matchday 7	Platense	0–4 (H)	1–1 (A)
Banfield	2–1 (A)	3–2 (H)	Matchday 8	Quilmes	3–2 (A)	1–1 (H)
Rosario Central	0–0 (H)	1–2 (A)	Matchday 9	Unión	0–0 (H)	1–0 (A)
Gimnasia y Esgrima LP	1–0 (A)	2–1 (H)	Matchday 10	Deportivo Morón	3–1 (A)	3–0 (H)
San Lorenzo	0–2 (H)	0–2 (A)	Matchday 11	Racing	2–2 (H)	1–3 (A)
**Group A winners**: Pos. / Team / Pts / W / T / L / Pl; 1 / Boca Juniors / 30 / 12 / 6 / 4 / 22; 2 / Chacarita Juniors / 30 / 13 / 4 / 5 / 22; 3 / Vélez Sarsfield / 26 / 9 / 8 / 5 / 22; 4 / Independiente / 25 / 10 / 5 / 3 / 22			Final standings	**Group B winners**: Pos. / Team / Pts / W / T / L / Pl; 1 / Racing / 35 / 14 / 7 / 1 / 22; 2 / River Plate / 31 / 12 / 7 / 3 / 22; 3 / Estudiantes (LP) / 27 / 11 / 5 / 6 / 22; 4 / Huracán / 24 / 8 / 8 / 6 / 22		
Racing	1–0 (N)		Semifinals	Boca Juniors	0–0 (a.e.t.) (Note: River Plate qualified on goal difference during the regular season.) (N)	

== Match ==
=== Summary ===
Chacarita scored two goals in the first half (both by Neumann). In the first minutes of the second half, forward Ángel Marcos start a run from the midfield to the opposite area, where he catched a pass from Leonardo Recúpero. Marcos dribbled a defender and goalkeeper Hugo Carballo, then moving to the left, when Miguel Ángel López tried to intercept him, Marcos made a nutmeg to score the third goal for Chacarita. Fifty years later, he regarded it as the best goal of his career.

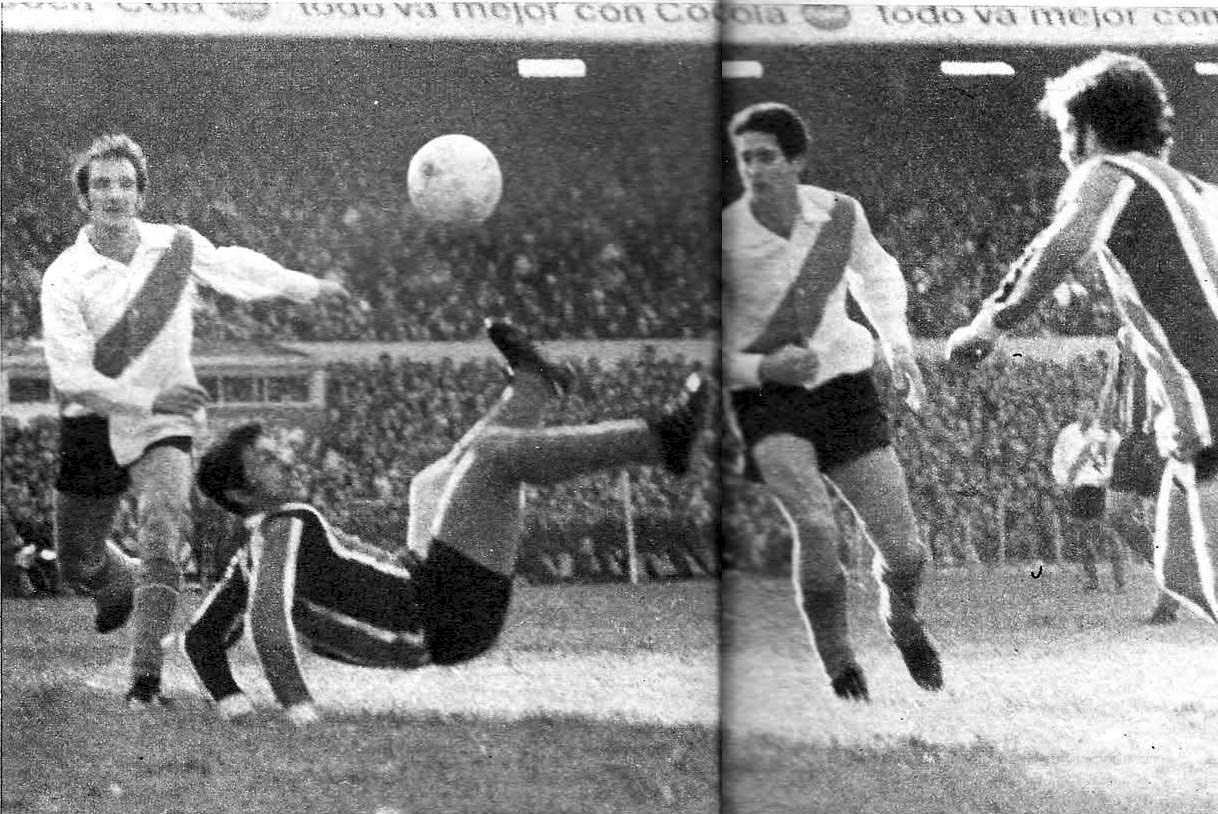
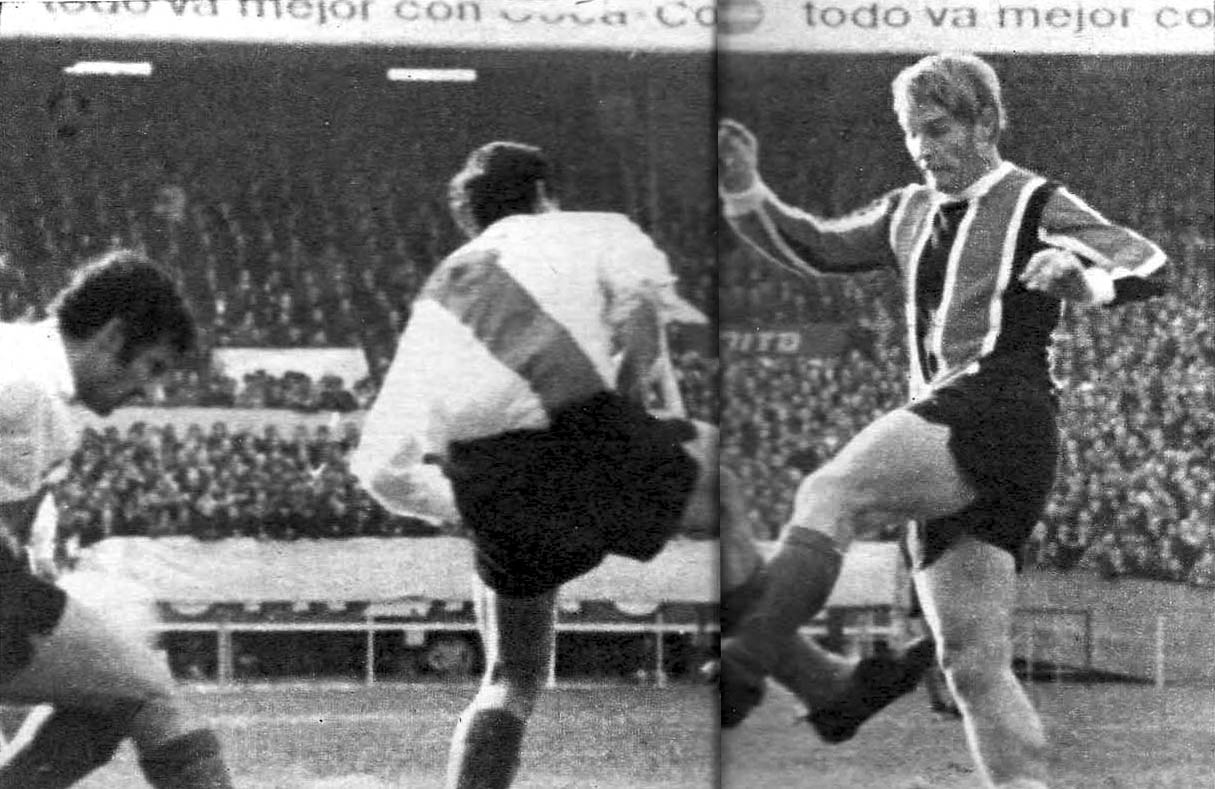
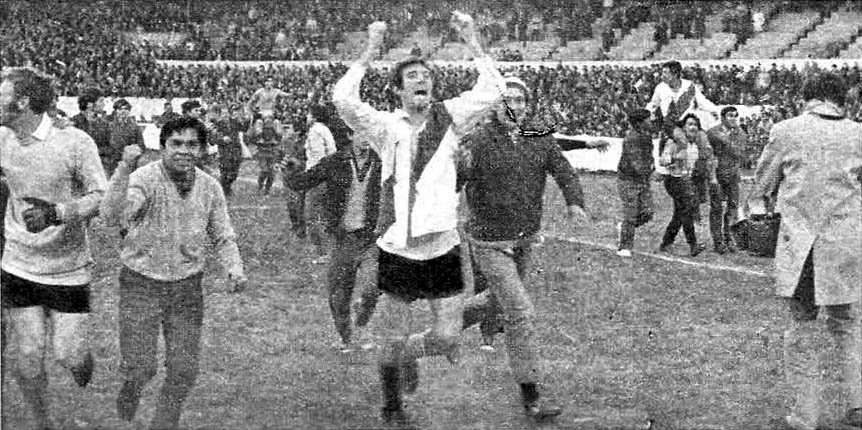
Some moments of the match and later celebrations

=== Details ===
1969 Campeonato Metropolitano Final
July 6, 1969

Chacarita Juniors	4–1	River Plate
Neumann 12', 37'; Marcos 47'; Frassoldati 56'	Report 1 Report 2	Trebucq 18'

Racing Stadium, Avellaneda
Attendance: 64,441
Referee: Roberto Barreiro

**Chacarita Juniors**	**River Plate**

GK	1	(Argentina) Eliseo Petrocelli
DF	4	(Argentina) Jorge A. Gómez
DF	2	(Argentina) Abel Pérez
DF	6	(Argentina) Ángel Bargas
DF	3	(Argentina) Franco Frassoldati
MF	8	(Argentina) Leonardo Recúpero
MF	5	(Argentina) Raúl Poncio
MF	10	(Argentina) Juan C. Puntonero
FW	7	(Argentina) Ángel Marcos
FW	9	(Argentina) Rodolfo Orife
FW	11	(Argentina) Horacio Neumann
Manager:
(Argentina) Víctor Rodríguez

GK	1	(Argentina) Hugo Carballo
DF	4	(Argentina) Roberto Ferreiro
DF	2	(Argentina) Miguel Ángel López
DF	6	(Argentina) Juan C. Guzmán
DF	3	(Argentina) Abel Vieytez
MF	8	(Argentina) Eduardo Dreyer
MF	5	(Argentina) Jorge Recio
MF	10	(Argentina) Roberto Gutiérrez
FW	7	(Argentina) Juan C. Trebucq
FW	9	(Argentina) Daniel Onega
FW	11	(Argentina) Oscar Más
Manager:
(Argentina) Ángel Labruna

== Aftermath ==
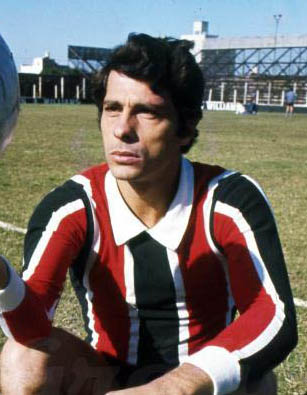
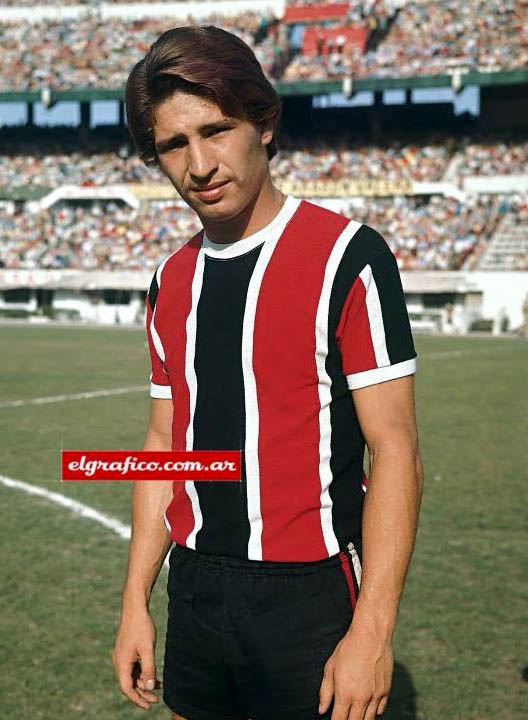
Ángel Marcos (left) and Carlos García Cambón, two key figures of Chacarita in 1969

Argentino Geronazzo, regarded by the media and his own players as the main builder of that Chacarita team, stated about his influence on that team that his best contribution to that team was "Having left on time", adding seriously: "when I left, the players had to assume their responsibility. I, as coach, absorbed everything and without me they had to mature alone. That's why they were champions".

The essential idea of that Chacarita team of '69 was to manage certain situations in a match and to respect the ball. We marked a small era. Because at that time destruction prevailed, and we played freely. We gave a breath of freedom to the skillful players, to those who believed in football as a game.

— Manager Argentino Geronazzo about his team

Regarding the players, Ángel Marcos was the key figure of Chacarita, apart from being considered the best player in the club's history. Another player from the youth divisions, Carlos García Cambón said in 2019: "I was trained by great master Ernesto Duchini. Winning a title in a small club is something wonderful because when you are champion with a big one, the following year it is already forgotten". Speaken of the factors that made Chacarita become a champion, García Cambón stated that Argentino Geronazzo deserved credit for bringing together youth players with the new ones, all under a footballing philosophy that materialized on the pitch in 1969, also praising the executive committee for their support to the team.

We were the antithesis of what was happening in our football, because Estudiantes de La Plata had won the championship with their style, which was both praised and criticized. We managed to realize our dream based on good play, pure football, and improvisation.

— Carlos García Cambón in 2019

Once the match concluded, the bus that was transporting Chacarita players and staff from Avellaneda to General San Martín Partido took almost six hours to complete the trip. They were escorted by a fire engine while being greeted by their fans, arriving to Estadio de Chacarita Juniors about 1:00 am.

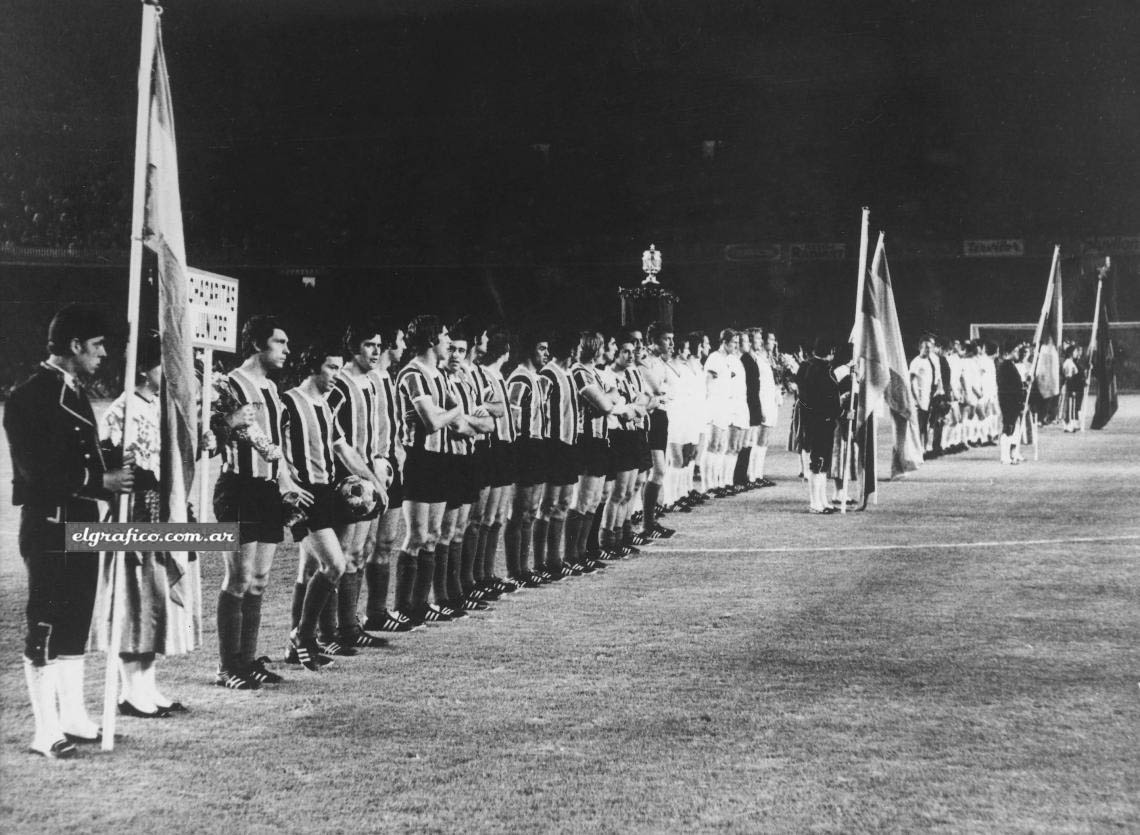
Chacarita v Bayern Munich teams in the 1971 Joan Gamper Cup

Chacarita repeated their good performance in the 1970 (where the team finished 1st of group A and lost in semifinal v Boca Juniors) and 1971 seasons (finished 3rd. in Campeonato Metropolitano)

Also in 1971 Chacarita Juniors was invited (as Argentine champions) to participate in the traditional Joan Gamper Trophy, where the team made a surprising debut defeating Bayern Munich 2–0 (goals by Marcos and Rodolfo Fucceneco). The line-up was: Daniel Carnevali; Raúl Forteis, Jorge Buzzo, Ángel Bargas, Franco Frassoldati; Luis Recúpero, Alberto Poncio, Juan Carlos Puntorero (Rodolfo Fucceneco); Ángel Marcos, Carlos María García Cambón, Horacio Neumann (Pedro Vicente Patti). The team was coached by Armando Mareque.

Chacarita qualified to play the final v host FC Barcelona (which had defeated Kispest Honvéd on penalties) but lost 1–0.
