= Georges Eo =

French footballer and manager (born 1948)

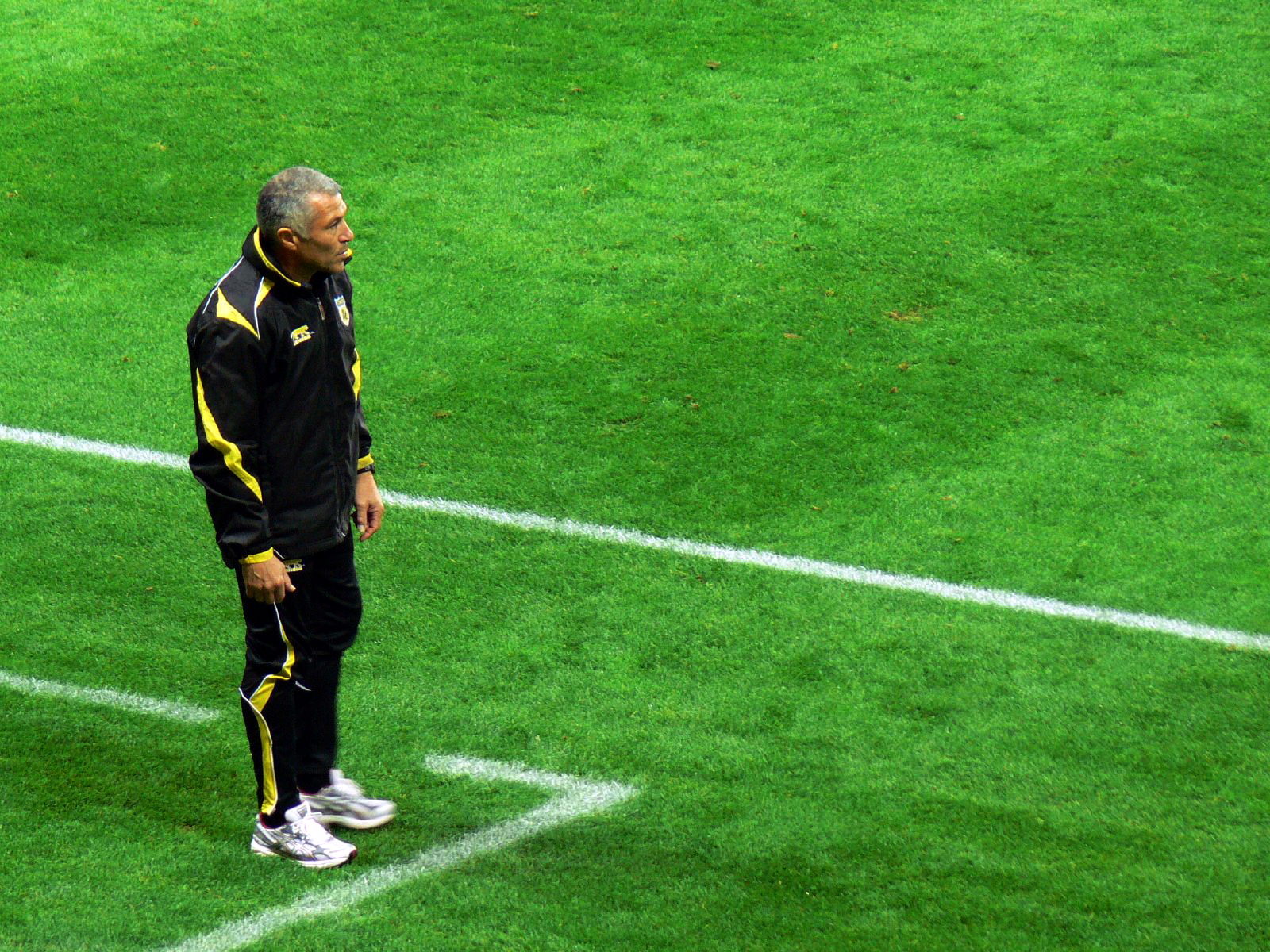
- Eo as Nantes coach in 2006

Personal information
- Date of birth: 7 November 1948 (age 77)
- Place of birth: Lorient, France
- Height: 1.70 m (5 ft 7 in)
- Position: Midfielder

Youth career
- 1958–1967: Lorient

Senior career*
Years	Team	Apps	(Gls)
1967–1972	Nantes		
1972–1974	Paris FC		
1974–1976	Marseille		
1976–1978	Red Star Saint-Ouen		
1978–1980	Paris FC		
1980–1983	Red Star Saint-Ouen		

International career
1969	France U-21	3	

Managerial career
- 1980–1985: Red Star Saint-Ouen
- 1985–1987: SC Abbeville
- 1987–2006: Nantes (assistant)
- 2006–2007: Nantes
- * Club domestic league appearances and goals

Georges Eo (born 7 November 1948) is a French football manager and former midfielder. He was assistant manager of Nantes from 1987 to 2005, during which time the club won two Ligue 1 titles. He became the club's full manager in 2006, but was replaced during the middle of the 2006–07 season by his assistant Michel Der Zakarian; they were relegated to the Ligue 2 at the end of the season.
