= YelloPark =

Proposed football stadium in Nantes, France

- Interactive map of YelloPark
- Location: Nantes, France
- Coordinates: 47.256165°N 1.5283012°W
- Capacity: 40,000 (planned)
- Surface: Grass
- Field size: 105m x 68m

Construction
- Groundbreaking: 2019 (planned)
- Opened: 2023 (planned)
- Cost: €200 million (estimated)
- Architects: HKS; ATSP

Tenant
- FC Nantes (planned) 2024 Summer Olympic Games (planned) 2023 Rugby World Cup (planned)

YelloPark was a proposed football stadium planned to be built in Nantes, France. It was expected to serve as the stadium of FC Nantes and as a football venue for the 2024 Summer Olympic Games in Paris and the 2023 Rugby World Cup. The stadium would have had a capacity of 40,000 and its construction was projected to take place between 2019 and 2022. It was to be built near the Stade de la Beaujoire that it was planned eventually to replace.

In a vote on 7 December 2018, Nantes Metropolitan Council agreed to discuss the sale of land critical to the proposed YelloPark project. Councillors also voted for the renovation of the Stade de la Beaujoire. However, after deliberations on 19 February 2019, the Council voted against selling the land needed to develop the project. On 26 February 2019, the project was subsequently cancelled.
