= Ángel Bargas =

Argentine footballer

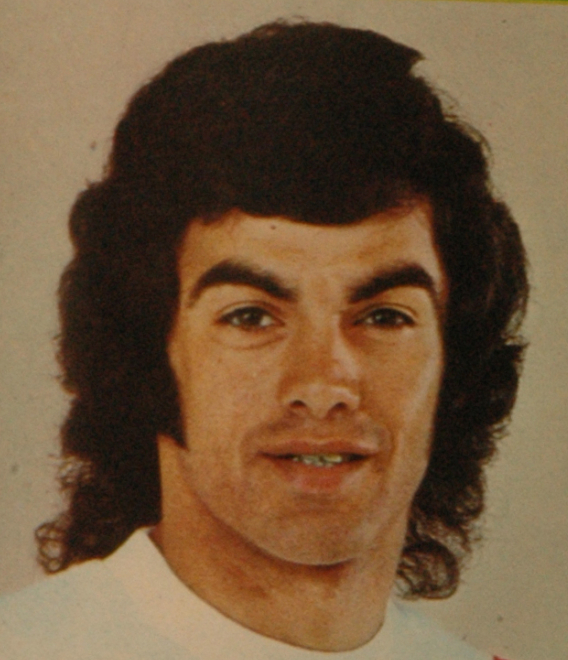
- Ángel Bargas in 1972

Personal information
- Full name: Ángel Hugo Bargas
- Date of birth: 29 October 1946 (age 80)
- Place of birth: Buenos Aires, Argentina
- Height: 1.75 m (5 ft 9 in)
- Position: Center back

Senior career*
Years	Team	Apps	(Gls)
1965	Racing Club	6	(0)
1966–1972	Chacarita Juniors	221	(4)
1973–1979	Nantes	189	(13)
1979–1981	FC Metz	63	(1)
1981–1984	CS Louhans-Cuiseaux	93	(11)
1984–1985	FC Le Puy	28	(1)
1988	AS Angoulême	1	(0)
Total		637	(31)

International career
1971–1974	Argentina	30	(1)

Managerial career
- USF Le Puy
- FC Seraing
- Chacarita Juniors
- Newell's Old Boys
- Atlético de Rafaela
- * Club domestic league appearances and goals as of August 20, 2007

Ángel Hugo Bargas (born 29 October 1946) is an Argentine former football defender. He represented Argentina at the 1974 FIFA World Cup.

== Playing career ==
Bargas, born in Buenos Aires, Argentina, started his career at Racing Club in 1965 but he moved to Chacarita Juniors in 1966. He was part of the team that won Chacarita's only Primera División title in 1969.

In 1970 Bargas was awarded the Olimpia de Plata, which is given to the player of the year in Argentine football.

Bargas moved to France in 1972 to play for FC Nantes, he stayed in France for the rest of his career, he moved on to FC Metz in 1979, CS Louhans-Cuiseaux in 1981 and FC Le Puy in 1984.

Bargas retired in 1985, but he had a brief comeback at the age of 41 in 1988 with AS Angoulême.

== International career ==
Bargas played 30 games for the Argentina national team between 1971 and 1974 scoring 1 goal.

== Honours ==
Chacarita Juniors

- Argentine Primera División: Metropolitano 1969

FC Nantes

- Ligue 1: 1972–73, 1976–77
- Coupe de France: 1978-79
