= Vincent Bracigliano =

French footballer (born 1958)

Personal information
- Date of birth: 30 September 1958 (age 68)
- Place of birth: Marange, France
- Height: 1.80 m (5 ft 11 in)
- Position: Midfielder

Senior career*
Years	Team	Apps	(Gls)
1976–1985	Metz	252	(16)
1985–1989	Nantes	112	(3)
1989–1992	Nîmes	66	(4)
1992–1994	Luçon		
- * Club domestic league appearances and goals

Vincent Bracigliano (born 30 September 1958) is a French former professional footballer who played as a midfielder. He is the uncle of Gennaro Bracigliano.

== Career ==
In 2000 Bracigliano became head of youth recruitment at his former club Nantes.

== Honours ==
Metz

- Coupe de France: 1983–84
