= Antoine Raab =

French-German footballer (1913–2006)

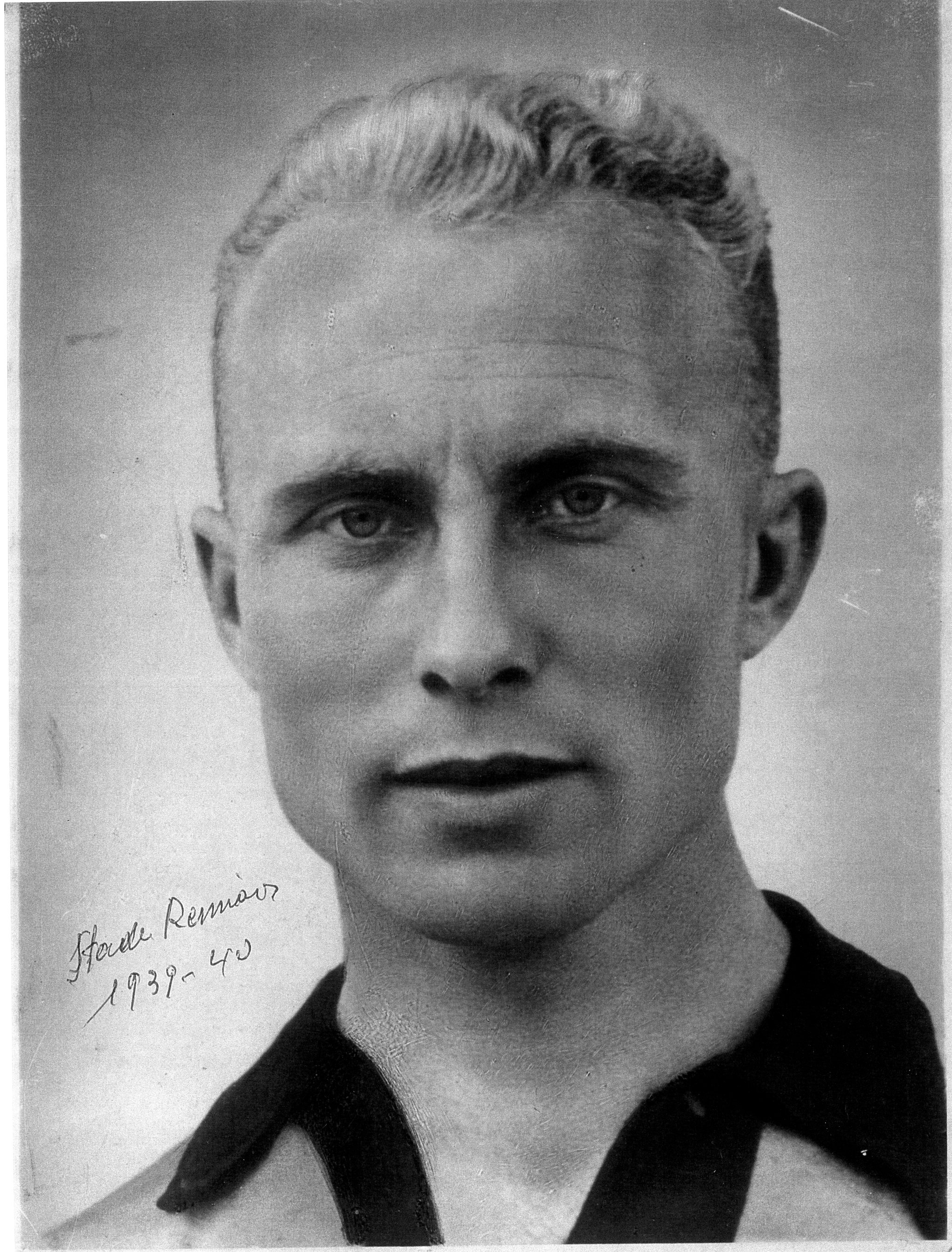
- 1939 portrait of Raab

Personal information
- Full name: Anton Raab
- Date of birth: 16 July 1913
- Place of birth: Frankfurt, German Empire
- Date of death: 12 December 2006 (aged 93)
- Place of death: Nantes, France
- Positions: Defender; midfielder

Senior career*
Years	Team	Apps	(Gls)
1929–1934	FC Union Niederrad		
1937–1938	CA Paris		
1939	UMP Saint-Nazaire		
1938–1939	Saint-Pierre de Nantes		
1939–1940	Rennes		
1944–1949	Nantes		
1949–1950	Laval		

Managerial career
- 1946–1949: FC Nantes
- 1949–1950: Stade Lavallois
- 1955–1956: FC Nantes
- 1956–1961: FC Nantes (director of sports)
- * Club domestic league appearances and goals

Anton "Antoine" Raab (16 July 1913 – 12 December 2006) was a German football player and manager. Raab spent most of his career in France after having escaped Nazi Germany, being prosecuted and incarcerated for refusing to give the Nazi salute at a football game, according to his words.

A biography about his life has been published in 2022 by a former French journalist.

== Biography ==
Raab, born in Frankfurt, Hesse, was one of four children of a German First World War veteran. His father, through his own experience during the war, raised Raab a pacifist and Christian and the latter held a strong conviction against any form of killing. Raab turned from his Christian faith however when, as a 19-year-old, he saw a priest bless a submarine in Hamburg.

A promising young player for Eintracht Frankfurt, Raab was selected to captain a German youth side in a game in Stuttgart where he refused to give the Nazi salute. He was not immediately prosecuted because of his status as a youth international, but was monitored by the police, and arrested 18 months later. Raab was detained and tortured for the next 11 months and eventually sentenced to 15 years of hard labour. Imprisoned in the fortress of Kassel, Raab contemplated suicide but was talked out of it by one of the guards. Raab fabricated a key, escaped and found shelter with a woman whose husband had been shot and killed by the Nazis. With the help of his brother, Raab escaped Germany for France on 1 May 1937, dressed in a SS uniform.

Unable to speak French and without any money Raab received help from local people and eventually made his way to Paris where he was recognised as former German youth international and, despite opposition from Germany, signed for CA Paris. Raab moved to Nantes for work reasons in 1938 but had to give up his post as a draftsman after the outbreak of the Second World War because of the company being involved in national defence contracts. He was eventually arrested because of his German nationality and sent to work in an ammunition factory until shortly before the armistice in 1940 when he escaped from the advancing German Army. During the German occupation of France Raab avoided arrest by the Germans and wrote pacifist leaflets which he distributed to German soldiers, hiding for a time in the village of Treillières.

After the liberation of Nantes in 1944 Raab joined FC Nantes and played for the club until 1949. He also had two stints as manager of FC Nantes as well as becoming the club's director of sports for a time. He became a critic of the money involved in professional football when, at the same time, there was so much suffering and poverty in the world. Raab died on 12 December 2006 in Nantes.
