= 1978–79 Coupe de France =

Tournament details
- Country: France

The Coupe de France 1978–79 was its 62nd edition. It was won by FC Nantes which defeated AJ Auxerre in the Final.

== Round of 16 ==
Team 1	Agg.	Team 2	1st leg	2nd leg
Lille OSC (D1)	5–2	AS Monaco (D1)	2–1	3–1
SC Bastia (D1)	1–6	RC Strasbourg (D1)	0–2	1–4
FC Nantes (D1)	4–2	OGC Nice (D1)	2–1	2–1
Olympique de Marseille (D1)	6–3	Angers SCO (D2)	4–2	2–1
AS Nancy (D1)	1–3	AS Angoulême (D2)	1–0	0–3
Stade de Reims (D1)	1–2	Avignon Football 84 (D2)	1–1	0–1
FC Gueugnon (D2)	3–2	AS Saint-Étienne (D1)	3–0	0–2
AJ Auxerre (D2)	2–0	Montpellier HSC (D2)	0–0	2–0

== Quarter-finals ==
Team 1	Agg.	Team 2	1st leg	2nd leg
FC Nantes (D1)	5–5 (a)	Olympique de Marseille (D1)	3–1	2–4
FC Gueugnon (D2)	0–8	RC Strasbourg (D1)	0–6	0–2
Lille OSC (D1)	1–2	AJ Auxerre (D2)	0–0	1–2
Avignon Football 84 (D2)	0–2	AS Angoulême (D2)	0–1	0–1

== Semi-finals ==
=== First leg ===
6 June 1979

Nantes (1)	6–2	Angoulême (2)
Rio 22' (pen.), 49' (pen.); Rampillon 29'; Trossero 45'; Pécout 52'; Muller 79'		Kovačić 65'; Legros 76'

Stade Marcel Saupin, Nantes
Attendance: 21,000
Referee: Robert Wurtz

5 June 1979

Auxerre (2)	0–0	Strasbourg (1)

Stade de l'Abbé Deschamps, Auxerre
Attendance: 15,000
Referee: Michel Kitabdjian

=== Second leg ===
9 June 1979

Angoulême (2)	1–1	Nantes (1)
Kovačić 57'		Sahnoun 90'

Stade Camille-Lebon, Angoulême
Attendance: 14,128
Referee: Achille Verbecke

Nantes won 7–3 on aggregate.

9 June 1979

Strasbourg (1)	2–2	Auxerre (2)
Gemmrich 13'; Piasecki 78' (pen.)		Cuperly 48'; Truffaut 82'

Stade de la Meinau, Strasbourg
Attendance: 19,043
Referee: Alain Delmer

2–2 on aggregate. Auxerre won on away goals.

== Final ==
16 June 1979

Nantes	4–1	Auxerre
Pécout 11', 104', 120'; Muller 113'		Mésones 49'

Parc des Princes, Paris
Attendance: 46,070
Referee: Michel Vautrot
