= Oscar Muller =

Argentine footballer (1957–2005)

Personal information
- Date of birth: 28 July 1957
- Place of birth: Rosario, Argentina
- Date of death: 19 August 2005 (aged 48)
- Place of death: Réunion
- Position: Midfielder

Youth career
- Stade Briochin

Senior career*
Years	Team	Apps	(Gls)
1974–1984	Nantes	193	(28)
1984–1986	Rennes	45	(2)
1986–1987	Amiens	13	(2)
1987–1988	AS Angoulême		
- * Club domestic league appearances and goals

Oscar Muller (28 July 1957 – 19 August 2005) was an Argentine professional footballer who played as a midfielder in France with Nantes, Rennes, Amiens and AS Angoulême. His father was Ramon Muller.

He played and scored for Nantes in the 1979 Coupe de France Final.
