= Víctor Trossero =

Argentine footballer

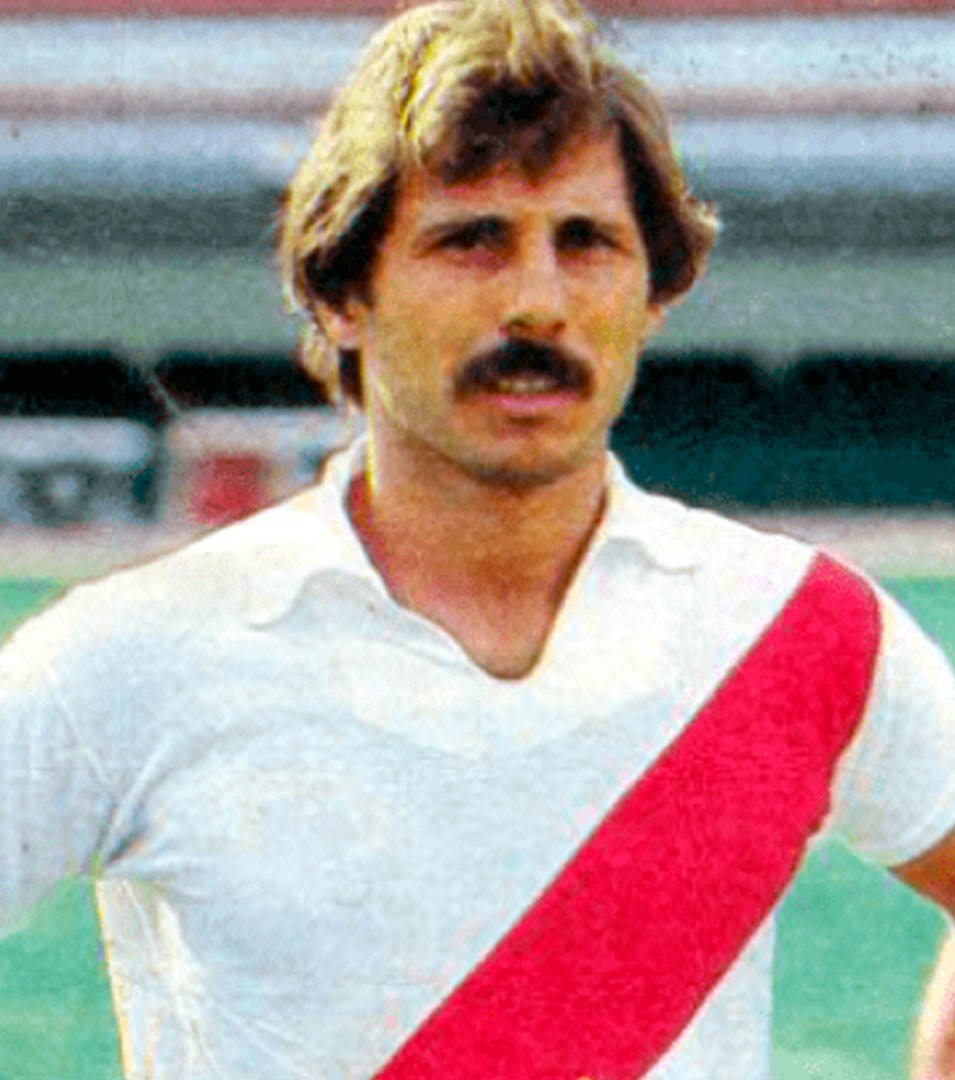
- Trossero with River Plate in 1983

Personal information
- Full name: Oscar Víctor Trossero
- Date of birth: 15 September 1953
- Place of birth: Godeken, Santa Fe, Argentina
- Date of death: October 12, 1983 (aged 30)
- Place of death: Rosario, Argentina
- Height: 1.74 m (5 ft 9 in)
- Position: Striker

Senior career*
Years	Team	Apps	(Gls)
1972	Boca Juniors	7	(1)
1973–1974	Racing Club	32	(7)
1975–1978	Unión de Santa Fe	125	(58)
1978–1980	Nantes	50	(23)
1980–1981	Monaco	37	(18)
1981–1982	Montpellier	27	(7)
1982–1983	River Plate	22	(7)
- * Club domestic league appearances and goals

Oscar Víctor Trossero (15 September 1953 – 12 October 1983) was an Argentine football striker.

== Playing career ==
He started his career with Boca Juniors but soon left for Racing Club and then Unión de Santa Fe. He played in France where he was quite successful, scoring 48 goals in 114 appearances with FC Nantes, AS Monaco FC and Montpellier HSC. With Nantes, he won the Coupe de France in 1979 and the Division 1 title in 1979–1980. He then came back to Argentina with River Plate. On 12 October 1983, he died from a Cerebral aneurysm in the locker-room after a match against Rosario Central.

== Honours ==
FC Nantes

- Coupe de France: 1978–79
- Ligue 1: 1979–80
