= FC Nantes =

Association football club in France

- Full name: Football Club de Nantes
- Nicknames: La Maison Jaune (The Yellow House); Les Canaris (The Canaries)
- Short name: FCN; Nantes
- Founded: 21 April 1943; 83 years ago
- Stadium: Stade de la Beaujoire
- Capacity: 35,322
- Owner: Waldemar Kita
- President: Waldemar Kita
- Head coach: Grégory Poirier
- League: Ligue 2
- 2025–26: Ligue 1, 17th of 18 (relegated)
- Website: www.fcnantes.com
Home colours	Away colours

Football Club de Nantes, commonly referred to as FC Nantes or simply Nantes (French: [nɑ̃t]; Breton: Naoned [ˈnãwnət]; Gallo: Naunnt), is a French professional football club based in Nantes in Pays de la Loire. The club was founded on 21 April 1943, during World War II, through a merger of five smaller local clubs based in the city. From 1992 to 2007, the club was referred to as FC Nantes Atlantique before reverting to its current name at the start of the 2007–08 season. Nantes competes in the Ligue 2, following relegation from the Ligue 1 in 2026. Nantes is one of the most successful clubs in French football, having won eight Ligue 1 titles, four Coupe de France wins and attained one Coupe de la Ligue victory.

The club is famous for its jeu à la nantaise (lit. 'Nantes-style play'), its collective spirit, mainly advocated under coaches José Arribas, Jean-Claude Suaudeau and Raynald Denoueix and for its youth system, which has produced players such as Marcel Desailly, Didier Deschamps, Mickaël Landreau, Claude Makélélé, Christian Karembeu and Jérémy Toulalan. As well as Les Canaris ('The Canaries'), Nantes is also nicknamed Les jaunes et verts ('The Green and Yellows') and La Maison Jaune ('The Yellow House').

== History ==
=== Foundation ===
The club was founded in 1943. Among the founding businessmen was the builder Jean Le Guillou, whose racehorse Ali Pacha had a jockey who wore yellow and green, colours that have since been represented on the FC Nantes jersey.

The first match played by Nantes as a professional team took place at the Stade Olympique de Colombes against CA Paris, where Nantes triumphed 2–0. The first home match was a defeat of the same score against Troyes. The club finished fifth at the end of this first season following which the club's manager Aimé Nuic left the club following a dispute, and was succeeded by Antoine Raab, who took over in a player-coach role. After winning 16 consecutive matches, Nantes lost 9–0 to Sochaux.

The club became a professional football club in 1945 after winning the Western Region championship, and started that season in the second division. Under historic president Marcel Saupin, it spent a few years as a mid-table club in that division, with even threat of relegation in 1950, avoided on the last game only.

=== The 1950s ===
Results improved from 1951 onwards, and the club just missed out on promotion in 1952, finishing 4th, under respected coach Émile Veinante. His successor Anton Raab was able to recruit more prestigious players, including Dutch stars Gerrit Vreken and Jan van Geen, but despite this, the club stagnated again. A number of coaches followed, but the club did not progress, and promising early starts to seasons often petered out by their ends.

In 1960, president Marcel Saupin selected the young and promising amateur coach José Arribas. He was credited with revolutionising the team's game, insisting on team-based, less individual play, and an attack-oriented game. He set up a 4-2-4 instead of the then traditional 4 banks of players. His system showed promise but results were not forthcoming right away: placings read 11th, 6th in his first 2 seasons, and finally 2nd in 1962, having led the second division for the first half of the season. In that time, the club took part in the short-lived Anglo-French-Scottish cup, losing 71 to Liverpool FC.

=== Life in the top division - the José Arribas years (1963 to 1976) ===
José Arribas and Nantes found their place in the top division right away and finished 8th in their first season. The following season was even better: the club becomes French champions, and their star striker Jacky Simon was the league's top goalscorer and became the first Nantes player to earn an international cap. The club also won the French League Cup.

In 1965, the club confirmed its place at the top and won the league again. Best defence (36 goals conceded), best attack (84 goals scored), Philippe Gondet ended the season as the league's top goalscorer with 36 goals in 37 games. French success did not lead to European success however, and Nantes lost their first-round European Cup game to Partizan Belgrade, who went on to reach the final. At the end of that season, three Nantes players (De Michèle, Gondet and Budzynski) were part of the French team playing the World Cup in England.

The late 60s and early 70s were not stellar years for the club, typically ending between the 10th and 7th place in the league. They made the French Cup final in 1970 but were routed by Saint-Etienne 5–0. Coach José Arribas's place was not under threat however, being very popular with players and fans alike. In parallel, the club worked hard behind the scene to modernise its structures and to develop its recruitment and player academy. Ex-players Jean-Claude Suaudeau and Robert Budzynski joined the coaching and recruitment team, and were tasked with deploying the club's playing philosophy at all levels of the club's teams. Young players such as Patrice Rio, allied with experienced Argentinians Ángel Marcos and Hugo Bargas, as well as Bayern Munich star Erich Maas enabled the club to turn its fortunes around and win the league in 1973. They also made the French Cup final but lost to Lyon.

The club was unable to break its European jinx: Danish amateur club Vejle eliminated Nantes in the first round of the European Cup. French league results were good, except the recurring disappointing European results of high-flying club Saint-Etienne. By 1976, the club and José Arribas finally parted ways after 13 years.

=== Jean Vincent and Jean-Claude Suaudeau (1976 to 1988) ===
New coach Jean Vincent was tasked with bringing more success in both domestic and European cups. He started by shuffling the players, putting aside a few stars and starting young academy players such as Loic Amisse, Eric Pécout and Bruno Baronchelli. Still using a very watchable system of play, the team won the league in 1977, for the fourth time in its history. In 1978, the team finished followed Monaco but European disappointments continued. That year, the club opened its state-of-the-art training complex La Jonelière (since renamed José Arribas Sporting Centre), the most advanced in France at the time.

In 1979, when Jean-Claude Suaudeau was made assistant manager, this promotion saw the club thrive, winning the French Cup, its first although finishing 2nd in the league. And finally in Europe, the club enjoyed some success, reaching the semi-finals of the Cup Winners Cup competition where they lost to Spanish club Valencia. With Argentinian star player Enzo Trossero, and young up-and-coming academy players José Touré and William Ayache, the club maintained 92 games unbeaten at home.

Jean Vincent left the club in 1981, struggling to fit his new star striker, Yugoslav Vahid Halilhodžić, into the Nantes system of play. Suaudeau took the reins by himself. He benefited from a star-studded defense, with French international goalkeeper Jean-Paul Bertrand-Demanes, centre-backs Patrice Rio and Maxime Bossis, and full backs Michel Bibard, Thierry Tusseau and William Ayache; Bruno Baronchelli still pulls the strings in midfield, helped by academy youngster Seth Adonkor protecting the defence; winger Loic Amisse enjoyed a purple patch in his twilight years; strikers José Touré (nicknamed 'the Brazilian') and particularly Halilhodžić enjoyed a great partnership. In their new La Beaujoire stadium, built for the 1984 Euro competition, Nantes won the title in 1983, and missed out on the double when they lost the French Cup final to Paris Saint-Germain.

Several other French clubs then increased their budgets significantly, and Nantes could not compete. The club lost Thierry Tusseau to Bordeaux, William Ayache to PSG and Maxime Bossis to Matra Racing. Nantes were still among the premier clubs in France, attracting players such as Jorge Burruchaga (World Cup winner with Argentina in 1986), and managed to finish sixth in 1984, second in 1985 and second again in 1986. Other expensive recruits such as Maurice Johnston and Eddie Vercauteren did not gel and the results gradually declined. The constant influx of talented academy players such as Didier Deschamps and Marcel Desailly was not quite enough to compensate the departures and progress made by other clubs. The club finished 12th in 1987 and tenth in 1988.

=== Crisis and renaissance (1988 to 2004) ===
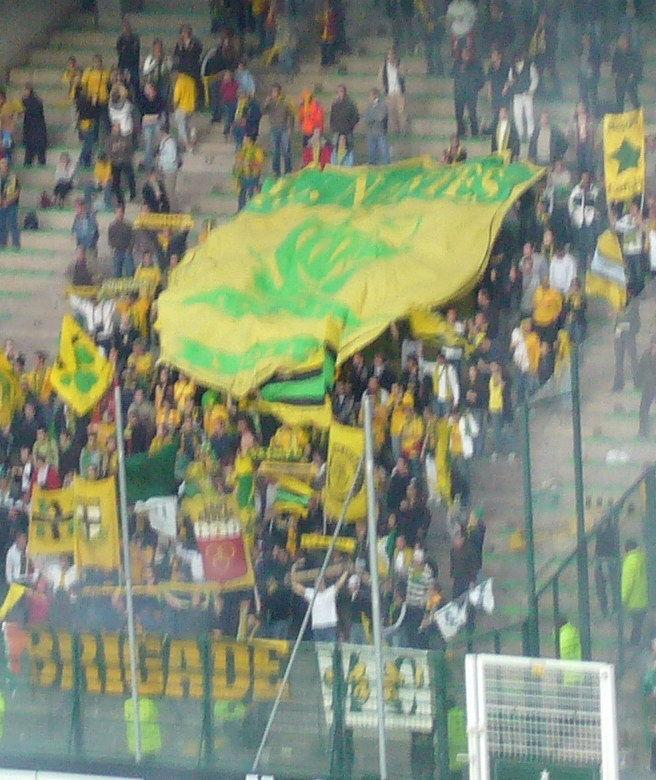
Nantes at an away match.

Suaudeau was then let go and Miroslav Blažević took his place. The club however experienced financial difficulties (and was even nearly demoted in 1992), and had to rely almost exclusively on its young academy players to survive in the top division. Eventually, Nantes became a "feeder club", selling its best young players to richer clubs: Deschamps and Yvon Le Roux to Marseille, Michel Der Zakarian to Montpellier, Antoine Kombouaré to Toulon and Vincent Bracigliano to Nîmes.

In July 1991, the club re-appointed Suaudeau, and in July 1992, after spending a fortnight in the second division due to an administrative decision by the DNCG (French Football's financial regulator), FC Nantes was renamed FC Nantes Atlantique, and was able to take its place in the first division back. Working closely with youth coach Raynald Denoueix, Suaudeau reinstated the "Nantes way of play" and, despite Marcel Desailly's departure to Marseille, stabilised the team. Soon the club could again show its trademark quick game with instant passing. The academy provided players who could mix the physical with the technical, particularly those such as Christian Karembeu, Patrice Loko, Japhet N'Doram and Nicolas Ouédec. Midfield maestros Claude Makélélé and Reynald Pedros delighted crowds all over France. The team reached the French Cup final in 1993 (losing to PSG) before winning the French league in 1995. Nantes registered ten 3–0 wins at home that season. In 1995–96 Nantes reached the semi-finals of the European Cup, coming close to eliminating Juventus after a superb performance in the return leg at home.

However, Nantes continued to sell its best players, with Karembeu and Loko sold in 1995 and Ouédec, N'Doram, Makélélé, Benoît Cauet and goalkeeper David Marraud sold in the following two years. In 1997, frustrated by this, Suaudeau left the club and Denoueix took charge. The academy came to the rescue once again, and nimble, technical, players such as Stéphane Ziani, Olivier Monterrubio, Eric Carrière, Mickaël Landreau and Frédéric Da Rocha enabled the club to win two French Cups in a row (1999 and 2000) before winning the league in 2001. Denoueix's departure for Real Sociedad impacted the club somewhat, but Nantes still managed a French Cup semi-final, a League Cup final and 6th place in the league in 2004 under Ángel Marcos.

=== Down and out (2005 to 2013) ===
Nantes finished last in the league in 2007 and were relegated, triggering a pitch invasion and protests by fans. Forty-four consecutive seasons in the top division came to an end.

In the summer of 2007, the club was sold to businessman Waldemar Kita. While the club had only five managers between 1960 and 2000, in the decade 2000 to 2010, ten were employed and sacked. The club was promoted back to the top division in 2008, only to be relegated again the next season. Nantes then finished in 15th place in Ligue 2 under the management of three different coaches.

=== Back to the top (2013 to present) ===
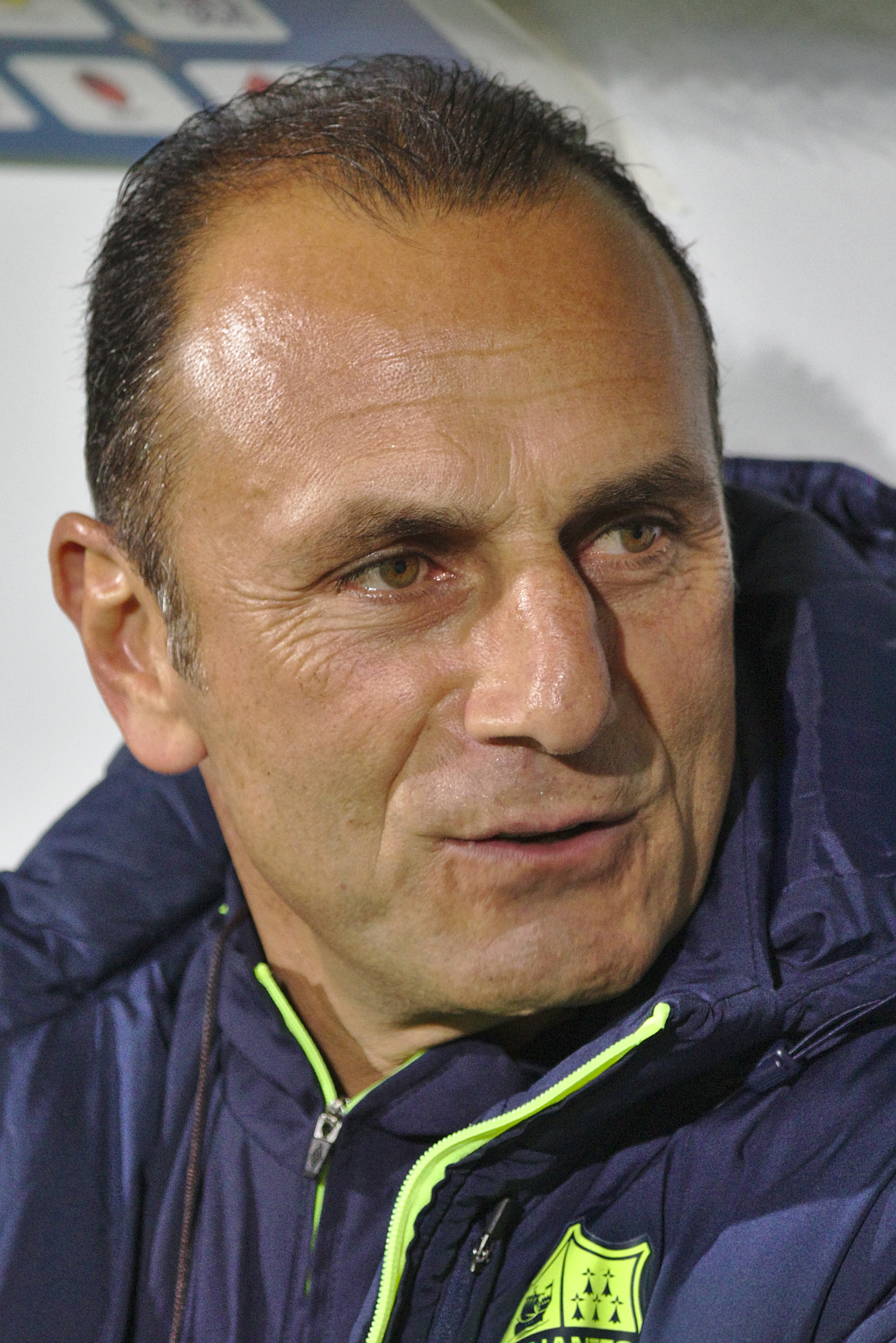
Michel Der Zakarian, former Nantes player (1979–1988) and manager (2007–2008; 2012–2016)

Ex-player Michel Der Zakarian took the helm in 2012, leading the club to promotion from the 2012–13 Ligue 2, with 20 goals from Filip Đorđević. The team made it to the semi-finals of the 2013–14 Coupe de la Ligue, losing 2–1 at home to PSG. In April 2016, after a tense relationship, club president Waldemar Kita announced that Der Zakarian would leave at the end of the season.

René Girard was sacked after 15 games with Nantes second from bottom in December 2016, and was replaced by Sérgio Conceição. He took the team to seventh place, but left in June 2017 for Porto to be closer to his family.

Following brief spells by Claudio Ranieri and Miguel Cardoso, former Nantes player Vahid Halilhodžić was hired in October 2018. The following January, the club transferred Argentine striker Emiliano Sala to Premier League club Cardiff City for £15 million; he died in a light aircraft crash in the English Channel. The club reached the semi-finals of the 2018–19 Coupe de France, losing 3–0 to PSG.

After a year with Christian Gourcuff in charge and seven games under former France national team manager Raymond Domenech, 18th-placed Nantes hired Antoine Kombouaré on 10 February 2021. He finished the season in that position, before winning the play-off against Toulouse to stay up. On 7 May 2022, Nantes won their fourth Coupe de France with a 1–0 win over Nice, their first honour since 2001; Ludovic Blas scored the only goal from the penalty spot. In the 2022–23 Ligue 1 season, Nantes avoided relegation on the final day of the campaign defeating Angers 1–0 to leapfrog Auxerre who went down instead. In the 2023–24 Ligue 1 season, Nantes finished 14th on the table, just four points above the relegation zone. In the 2025–26 Ligue 1 season, Nantes finished 17th, marking their relegation after 13 years in the top flight.

== Stadiums ==
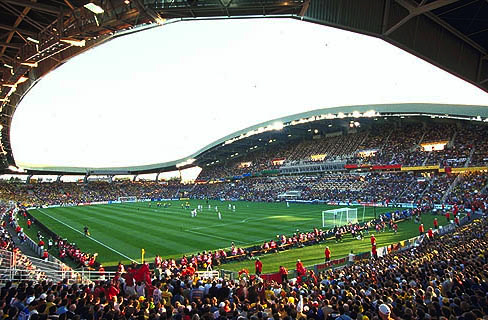
Stade de la Beaujoire, also known as the Stade de Nantes.

FC Nantes played at Stade Marcel Saupin from 1937 to 1984. They moved to their current home ground Stade de la Beaujoire in 1984; the stadium has a capacity of 35,322. A new stadium dubbed 'YelloPark' was expected to be built as Nantes' home ground in 2022, but the project was abandoned on 26 February 2019 following refusal by the Nantes Metropolitan Council to sell lands needed for development of the site.

== Players ==
=== Current squad ===
As of 7 September 2026

Note: Flags indicate national team as defined under FIFA eligibility rules; some limited exceptions apply. Players may hold more than one non-FIFA nationality.

No.	Pos.	Nation	Player
1	GK	FRA	Maxime Dupé
4	DF	GUI	Saïdou Sow (on loan from Strasbourg)
5	DF	FRA	Lucas Perrin
7	FW	FRA	Antoine Joujou
8	MF	FRA	Johann Lepenant
12	FW	FRA	Killian Corredor
13	DF	MLI	Fodé Doucouré
14	MF	SEN	Lamine Diack
16	GK	FRA	Alexis Mirbach
17	MF	FRA	Dehmaine Tabibou
18	DF	FRA	Fabien Centonze
19	MF	FRA	Louis Leroux
20	MF	FRA	Mathieu Cafaro
23	MF	CMR	Wilitty Younoussa

No.	Pos.	Nation	Player
24	DF	FRA	Frédéric Guilbert
26	MF	FRA	Ryad Hachem
27	FW	FRA	Thomas Robinet
28	MF	MLI	Ibrahima Sissoko
37	FW	CMR	Ignatius Ganago
40	GK	FRA	Yanel Zézé
44	MF	FRA	Balthazar Pierret
67	MF	FRA	Malang Gomes
69	MF	FRA	Sacha Ziani
72	DF	MLI	Sékou Doucouré
75	DF	TUN	Amin Cherni (on loan from Göztepe)
78	DF	FRA	Tylel Tati
98	DF	FRA	Kelvin Amian (captain)

=== Out on loan ===
Note: Flags indicate national team as defined under FIFA eligibility rules; some limited exceptions apply. Players may hold more than one non-FIFA nationality.

No. / Pos. / Nation / Player; — / DF / FRA / Hugo Lamy (at La Roche-sur-Yon until 30 June 2027)	No. / Pos. / Nation / Player; — / MF / MTN / Bahmed Deuff (at Antwerp until 30 June 2027)

=== Retired numbers ===
No.	Player	Nationality	Position	Reason
9	Emiliano Sala	Argentina	Striker	Posthumous

=== Notable players ===
Below are the notable former players who have represented Nantes in league and international competition since the club's foundation in 1943. To appear in the section below, a player must have played in at least 100 official matches for the club.

For a complete list of FC Nantes players, see Category:FC Nantes players

- (France) Loïc Amisse
- (France) Sylvain Armand
- (France) Jean-Kévin Augustin
- (France) William Ayache
- (France) Bruno Baronchelli
- (France) Jean-Paul Bertrand-Demanes
- (France) Bernard Blanchet
- (France) Ludovic Blas
- (France) Maxime Bossis
- (France) Vincent Bracigliano
- (France) Robert Budzynski
- (France) Eric Carrière
- (France) Frédéric Da Rocha
- (France) Marcel Desailly
- (France) Didier Deschamps
- (France) Jean-Michel Ferri
- (France) Nicolas Gillet
- (France) Philippe Gondet
- (France) Jocelyn Gourvennec
- (France) Christian Karembeu
- (France) Antoine Kombouaré
- (France) Mickaël Landreau
- (France) Yvon Le Roux
- (France) Patrice Loko
- (France) Claude Makélélé
- (France) Henri Michel
- (France) Olivier Monterrubio
- (France) Jean-Claude Osman
- (France) Nicolas Ouédec
- (France) Nicolas Pallois
- (France) Dimitri Payet
- (France) Éric Pécout
- (France) Reynald Pedros
- (France) Gilles Rampillon
- (France) Patrice Rio
- (France) Omar Sahnoun
- (France) Nicolas Savinaud
- (France) Jean-Claude Suaudeau
- (France) Jérémy Toulalan
- (France) José Touré
- (France) Thierry Tusseau
- (France) Valentin Rongier
- (France) Jordan Veretout
- (France) Stéphane Ziani
- (Algeria) Djamel Abdoun
- (Argentina) Ángel Bargas
- (Argentina) Jorge Burruchaga
- (Argentina) Mauro Cetto
- (Argentina) Néstor Fabbri
- (Argentina) Ángel Marcos
- (Argentina) Oscar Muller
- (Argentina) Julio Olarticoechea
- (Argentina) Emiliano Sala (retired No 9 shirt in posthumous honour)
- (Argentina) Victor Trossero
- (Armenia) Michel Der Zakarian
- (Belgium) Franky Vercauteren
- (Brazil) Diego Carlos
- (Brazil) Andrei Girotto
- (Bosnia and Herzegovina) Vahid Halilhodžić
- (Cameroon) Salomon Olembé
- (Chad) Japhet N'Doram
- (Venezuela) Oswaldo Vizcarrondo
- (Colombia) Mario Yepes
- (Germany) Erich Maas
- (Morocco) Noureddine Naybet
- (Morocco) Jaouad Zairi
- (Nigeria) Samson Siasia
- (Nigeria) Moses Simon
- (Poland) Robert Gadocha
- (Poland) Roman Kosecki
- (Romania) Viorel Moldovan
- (Romania) Claudiu Keșerü
- (Scotland) Mo Johnston
- (Serbia) Filip Đorđević
- (Spain) Pedro Chirivella
- (French Polynesia) Marama Vahirua
- (Tunisia) Imed Mhedhebi
- (Tunisia) Adel Sellimi
- (United States) Alejandro Bedoya

== Club officials ==
Position	Staff
Sports coordinator	(France) Philippe Mao
Head coach	(France) Grégory Poirier
Assistant coach	(France) Patrick Collot (France) Éric Blahic (France) Stéphane Mangione
Goalkeeping coach	(France) Faouzi Amzal
Fitness coach	(France) Gilles Marambaud
Conditioning coach	(France) Michel Dufour
Video Analyst	(France) Robin Freneau
Scout	(France) Martial Desbordes (France) Bernard Blanchet (France) Alain Merchadier (Guinea-Bissau) (France) Odilio Gomis
Doctor	(France) Isabelle Salaün (France) Marc Dauty
Physiotherapist	(France) Nicolas-Pierre Bernot (France) Jean-Philippe Cadu (France) Philippe Chantebel (France) Adrien Verger
Intendants	(France) Olivier Sanvers (France) Patrice Tahe
Performance manager	(Portugal) Francisco Calvete
Team Manager	(France) Tom Lahaye

== Coaches ==
- (France) Aimé Nuic (1943–46)
- (Germany) Antoine Raab (1946–49)
- (France) Antoine Gorius (1949–51)
- (France) Émile Veinante (1951–55)
- (Germany) Antoine Raab (1955–56)
- (Germany) Stanislas Staho (1956)
- (Czechoslovakia) Ludwig Dupal (1956–59)
- (Czechoslovakia) Karel Michlowsky (1959–60)
- (France) José Arribas (1960–76)
- (France) Jean Vincent (1976–82)
- (France) Jean-Claude Suaudeau (1 July 1982 – 30 June 1988)
- (Croatia) Miroslav "Ćiro" Blažević (1 July 1988 – 2 February 1991)
- (France) Jean-Claude Suaudeau (2 February 1991 – 30 June 1997)
- (France) Raynald Denoueix (1 July 1997 – 27 December 2001)
- (Argentina) Ángel Marcos (28 December Dec 2001–30 June 2003)
- (France) Loïc Amisse (5 June 2003 – 2 January 2005)
- (France) Serge Le Dizet (3 January 2005 – 10 September 2006)
- (France) Georges Eo (20 September 2006 – 12 February 2007)
- (Armenia) Michel Der Zakarian and (Chad) Japhet N'Doram (12 February 2007–07)
- (Armenia) Michel Der Zakarian (2007–26 August 2008)
- (France) Christian Larièpe (interim) (27 Aug 2008 – 2 September 2008)
- (France) Elie Baup (2 September 2008 – 30 June 2009)
- (Germany) Gernot Rohr (1 July 2009 – 3 December 2009)
- (France) Jean-Marc Furlan (3 December 2009 – 20 February 2010)
- (France) Baptiste Gentili (21 February 2010 – 6 March 2011)
- (France) Philippe Anziani (7 March 2011 – 30 May 2011)
- (France) Landry Chauvin (31 May 2011 – 30 May 2012)
- (Armenia) Michel Der Zakarian (31 May 2012 – 10 May 2016)
- (France) René Girard (11 May 2016 – 2 December 2016)
- (Portugal) Sérgio Conceição (8 December 2016 – 6 June 2017)
- (Italy) Claudio Ranieri (15 June 2017 – 19 May 2018)
- (Portugal) Miguel Cardoso (13 June 2018 – 2 October 2018)
- (Bosnia and Herzegovina) Vahid Halilhodžić (2 October 2018 – 2 August 2019)
- (France) Christian Gourcuff (August 2019 – December 2020)
- (France) Raymond Domenech (December 2020 – February 2021)
- (France) Antoine Kombouaré (February 2021 – May 2023)
- (France) Pierre Aristouy (May 2023 – 29 November 2023)
- (France) Jocelyn Gourvennec (29 November 2023 – 18 March 2024)
- (France) Antoine Kombouaré (18 March 2024 – 20 May 2025)
- (Portugal) Luís Castro (16 June 2025 – 10 December 2025)
- (Morocco) Ahmed Kantari (10 December 2025 – 10 March 2026)
- (Bosnia and Herzegovina) Vahid Halilhodžić (10 March 2026 – 30 June 2026)
- (Armenia) Michel Der Zakarian (1 July 2026 – 24 August 2026)
- (France) Grégory Poirier (25 August 2026 – present)

== Honours ==
=== National ===
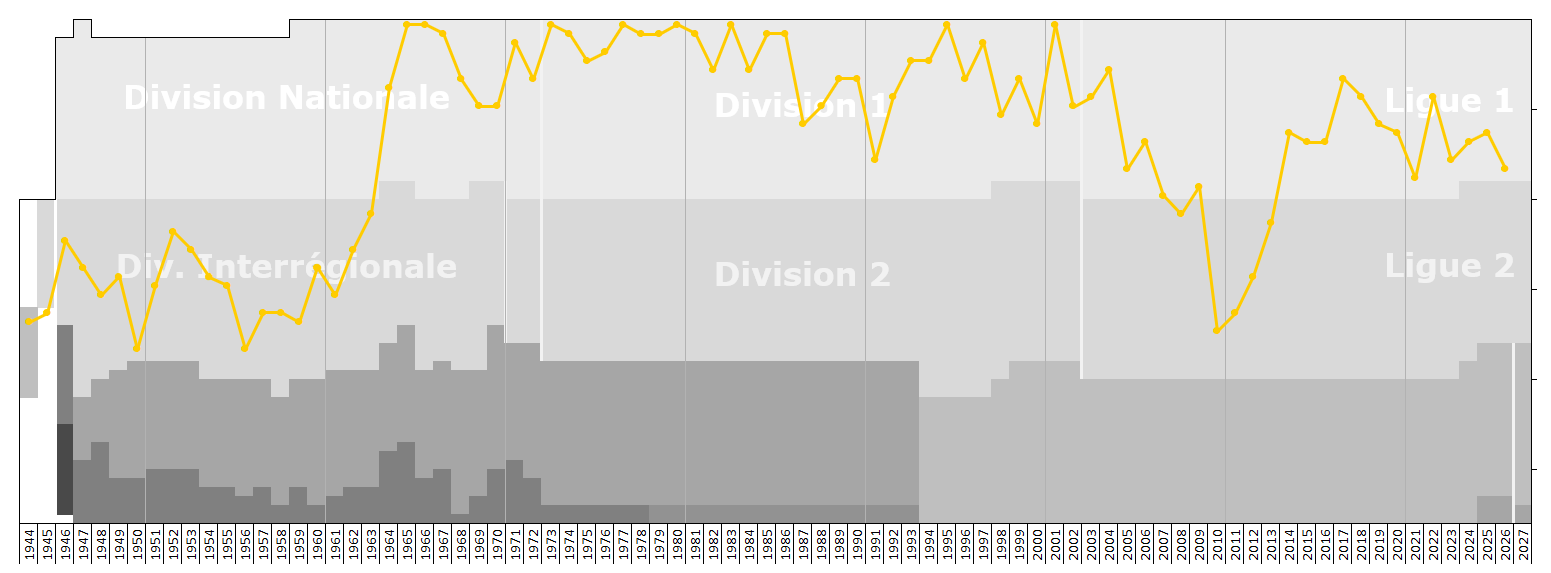
Historical league performance chart of FC Nantes

- Ligue 1
  - Winners (8): 1964–65, 1965–66, 1972–73, 1976–77, 1979–80, 1982–83, 1994–95, 2000–01
- Coupe de France
  - Winners (4): 1978–79, 1998–99, 1999–2000, 2021–22
- Coupe de la Ligue
  - Winners: 1964–65
- Trophée des Champions
  - Winners (3): 1965, 1999, 2001

=== International ===
- UEFA Champions League
  - Semi-finalists: 1995–96
- UEFA Cup
  - Quarter-finalists: 1994–95
- UEFA Cup Winners' Cup
  - Semi-finalists: 1979–80
- Cup of the Alps
  - Winners: 1982
