= Stade de la Beaujoire =

Stadium in Nantes, France

Stade de la Beaujoire – Louis Fonteneau
- La Beaujoire
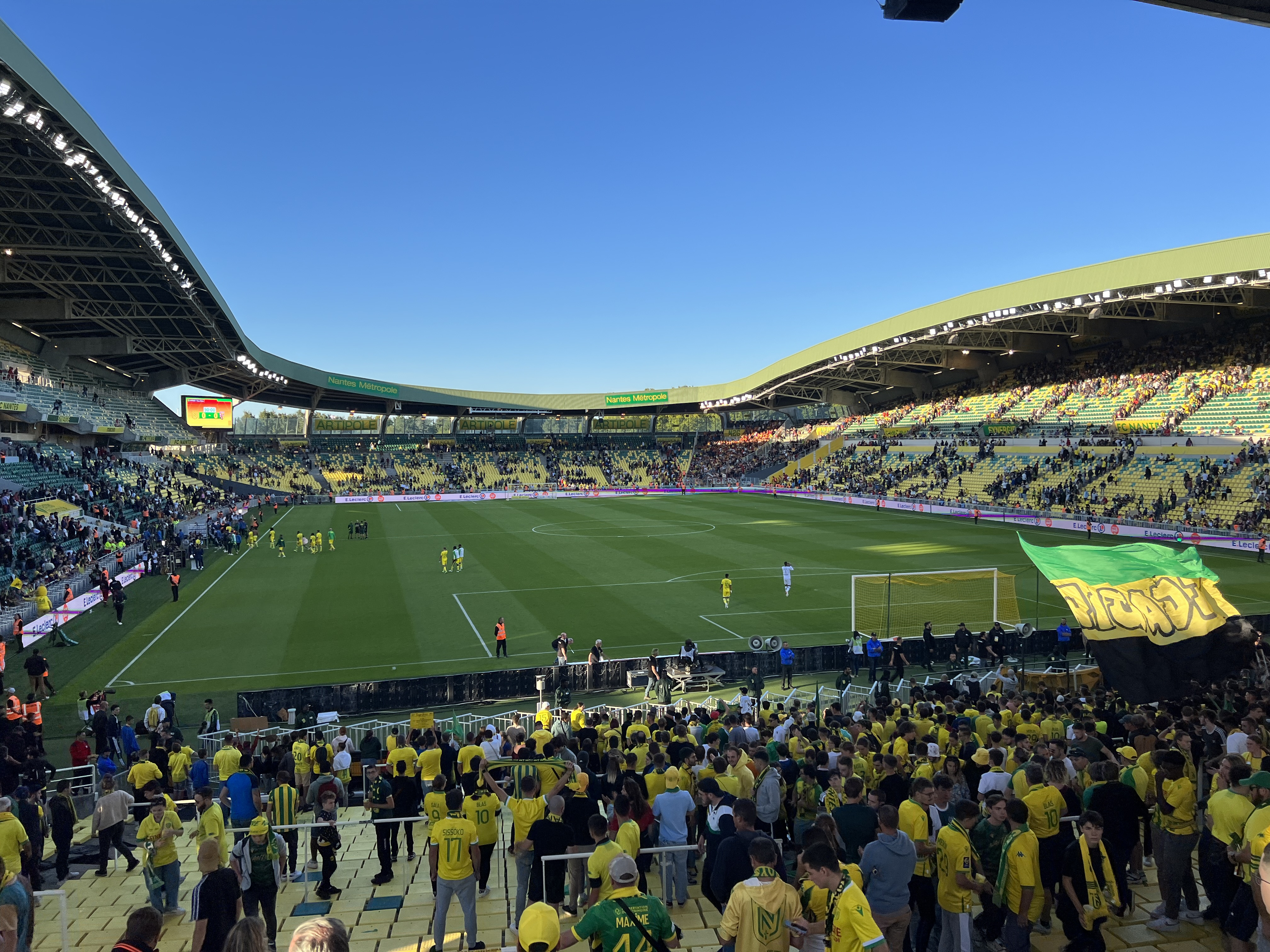

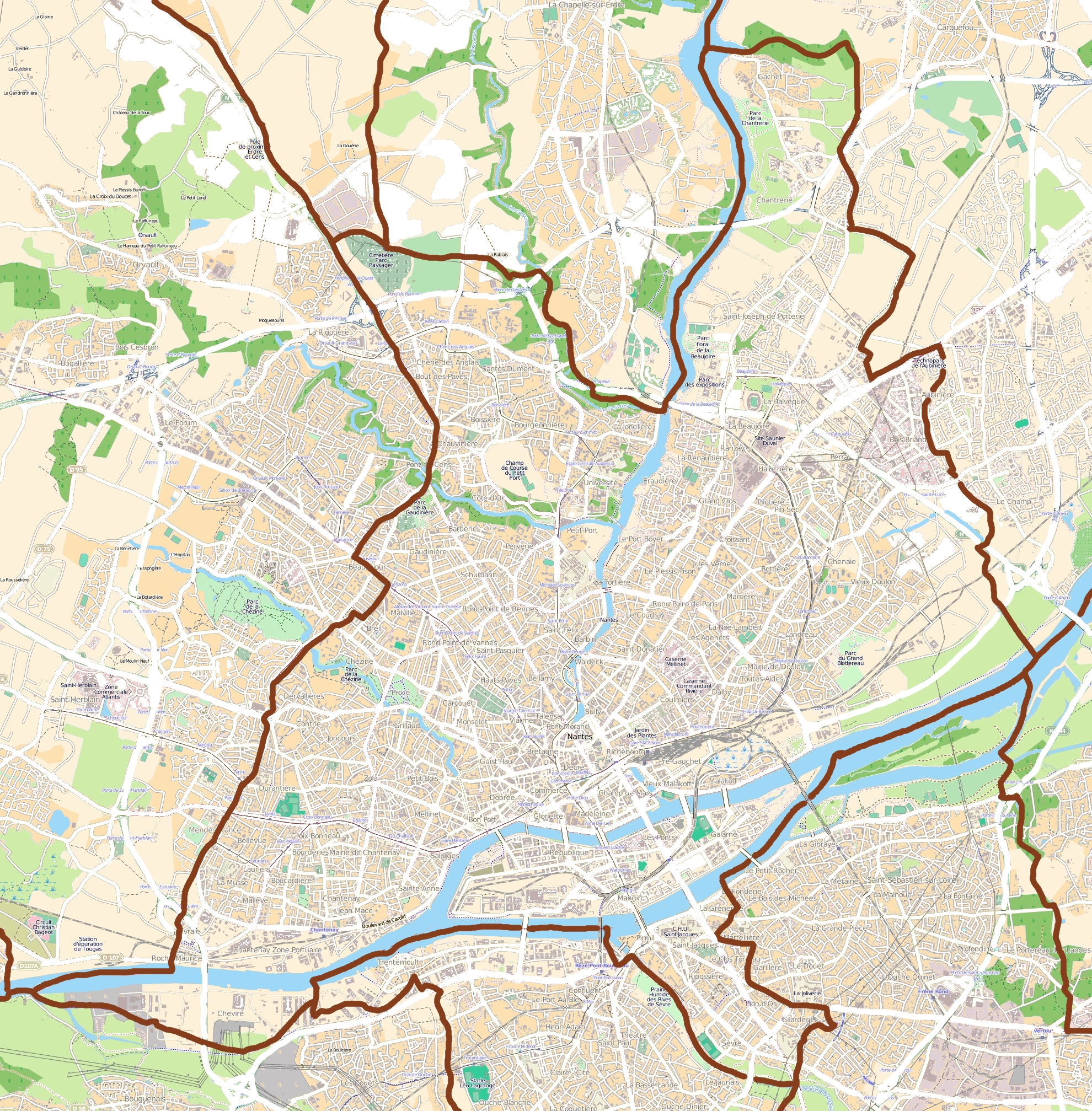
- Location in Nantes Location in France
- Location: Route de Saint Joseph 44300, Nantes, France
- Coordinates: 47.256°N 1.525°W
- Capacity: 35,318
- Surface: Desso GrassMaster
- Field size: 117 m × 78 m (384 ft × 256 ft)

Construction
- Opened: 1984
- Architect: Berdje Agopyan

Tenant
- FC Nantes (1984–present)

Website
- fcnantes.com

The Stade de la Beaujoire – Louis Fonteneau, mostly known as Stade de la Beaujoire (French pronunciation: [stad də la boʒwaʁ]), is a stadium in Nantes, France. It is the home of French football club FC Nantes, known as the canaries.

The stadium was built in a hexagon shape for football use. The construction was purposely finished in 1984 for use in the European Football Championship, then was renovated for the Football World Cup in 1998. The Beaujoire stadium has also hosted international rugby union matches, such as the group stages of both Rugby World Cups in France during 2007 and 2023. Then, it also hosted men's and women's football games in 2024 Paris Olympics in France. As well as sports, the venue also hosts music concerts.

== History ==
The current stadium is in use for FC Nantes football team, it was built as a second stadium in the city of Nantes replacing the Marcel-Saupin stadium as the team's home ground. The club's owners chose Berdje Agopyan as the architect of their new stadium, he was also responsible for the design of Parc des Princes stadium in Paris in the 1970s. The project took almost 3 years to complete from the city council's approval in June 1982.

The stadium opened for the first time on 8 May 1984, for a friendly game between FC Nantes and Romania in front of 30,000 fans. It was named after Louis Fonteneau, who was president of FC Nantes between 1969 and 1986. It was renovated in 1998 for the 1998 FIFA World Cup. While its original capacity was 52,923, in 1998 it was converted to an all-seater stadium and its current capacity is 35,322. Highest attendance was 51,359 for France-Belgium match in 1984.

=== Football ===
La Beaujoire hosted matches during the UEFA Euro 1984, including a 5–0 victory for France over Belgium with three goals from Michel Platini. Six matches were also played there during the 1998 FIFA World Cup, including the quarter-final between Brazil and Denmark. The stadium was not selected for the UEFA Euro 2016.

The France national football team have played in Nantes' stadium on five occasions, most recently in 2019 where they played a friendly match against Bolivia.

=== Rugby ===
The stadium also hosts international rugby matches, including France against New Zealand (16–3) on 15 November 1986. In September 2007, it hosted three pool matches of the 2007 Rugby World Cup: Wales vs Canada on 9 September, England vs Samoa on 22 September and Wales vs Fiji on 29 September. In domestic rugby, La Beaujoire hosted both Top 14 semifinal matches in 2013, and Paris-area Top 14 side Racing Métro 92 played their final "home" match of the 2013–14 season against Clermont at La Beaujoire on 19 April 2014.

== Tournament results ==
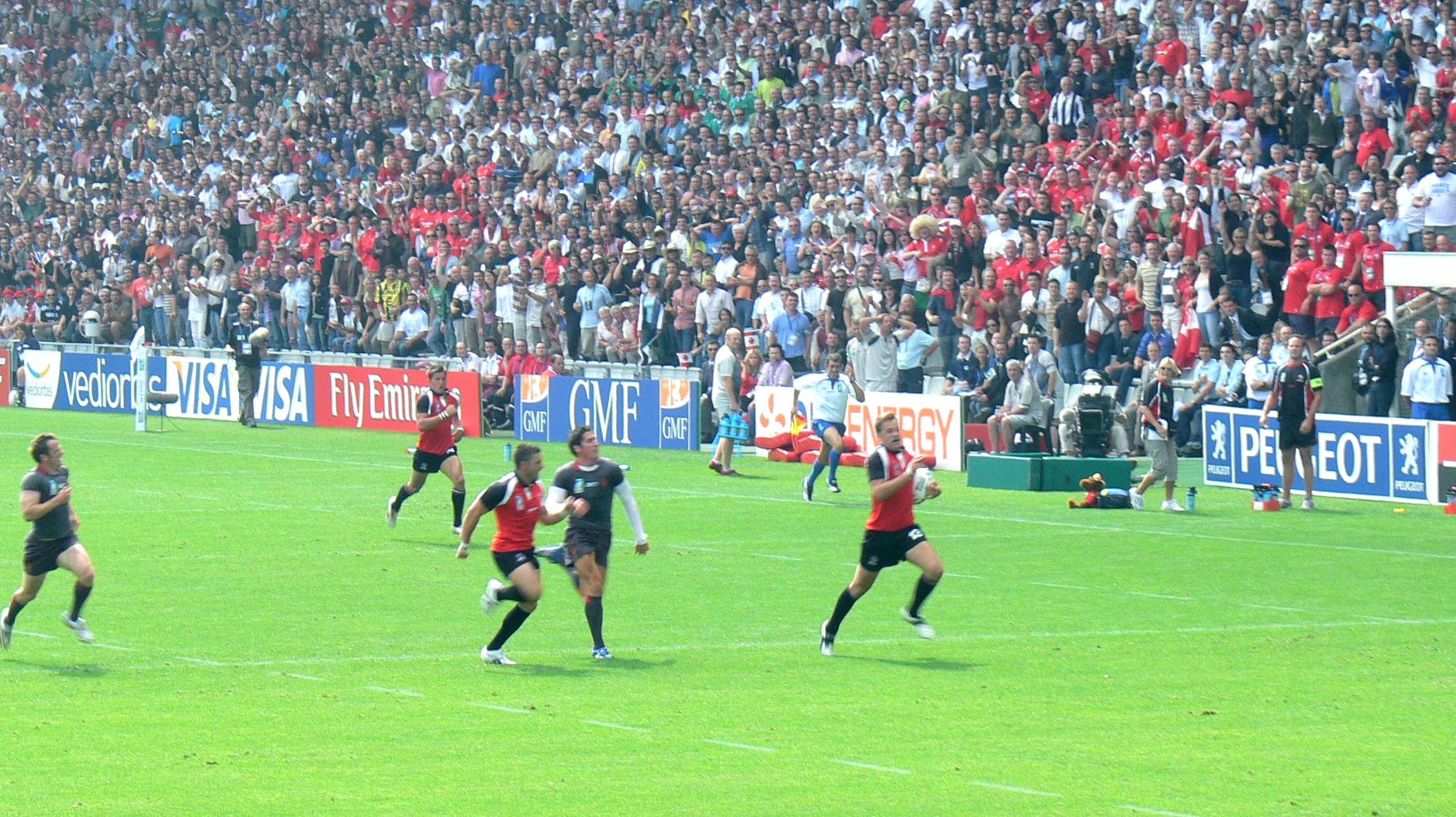
Wales v. Canada, RWC 2007.

Since 1984, the stadium in Nantes has hosted international tournament matches for football and rugby competitions in France.

=== UEFA Euro 1984 ===
The stadium was selected as one of the venues for the 1984 UEFA European Championship and held the following matches:

Date	Team #1	Result	Team #2	Round	Attendance
16 June 1984	France	5–0	Belgium	Group 1	51,359
20 June 1984	Portugal	1–0	Romania	Group 2	24,464

=== 1998 FIFA World Cup ===
The stadium was one of the venues of the 1998 FIFA World Cup and held the following matches:

Date	Team #1	Result	Team #2	Round	Attendance
13 June 1998	Spain	2–3	Nigeria	Group D	35,500
16 June 1998	Brazil	3–0	Morocco	Group A	35,500
20 June 1998	Japan	0–1	Croatia	Group H	35,500
23 June 1998	Chile	1–1	Cameroon	Group B	35,500
25 June 1998	United States	0–1	FR Yugoslavia	Group F	35,500
3 July 1998	Brazil	3–2	Denmark	Quarter-finals	35,500

=== 2007 Rugby World Cup ===
The stadium was used in the group stage of the 2007 Rugby World Cup in France.

Date	Time (CET)	Team #1	Result	Team #2	Round	Attendance
9 September 2007	14:00	Wales	42–17	Canada	Pool B	37,500
22 September 2007	16:00	England	44–22	Samoa	Pool A	37,022
29 September 2007	17:00	Wales	34–38	Fiji	Pool B	37,080

=== 2023 Rugby World Cup ===
The stadium was one of the venues of the 2023 Rugby World Cup, and hosted the following matches:

Date	Time (CET)	Team #1	Result	Team #2	Round	Attendance
16 September 2023	21:00	Ireland	59–16	Tonga	Pool B	35,673
30 September 2023	15:00	Argentina	59–5	Chile	Pool D	37,000
7 October 2023	15:00	Wales	43–19	Georgia	Pool C	33,580
8 October 2023	13:00	Japan	27–39	Argentina	Pool D	33,624

=== 2024 Summer Olympics ===
The football tournament for Men and Women at the 2024 Summer Olympics.

Date	Team #1	Result	Team #2	Round	Attendance
24 July 2024	Egypt	0–0	Dominican Republic	Men's group C	13,945
25 July 2024	Spain	2–1	Japan	Women's group C	10,377
27 July 2024	Uzbekistan	0–1	Egypt	Men's group C	20,658
28 July 2024	Spain	1–0	Nigeria	Women's group C	11,079
30 July 2024	Israel	0–1	Japan	Men's group D	11,671
31 July 2024	Japan	3–1	Nigeria	Women's group C	6,480
3 August 2024	France	0–1	Brazil	Women's quarter-finals	32,280
8 August 2024	Egypt	0–6	Morocco	Men's bronze medal match	27,391

== Music concerts ==
Since the stadium's inauguration in 1984, many musical acts have played concerts in the stadium, memorable concerts include:

- Genesis, 1987
- Pink Floyd, June 1988
- Dire Straits, May 1992
- U2, May 1993
- Johnny Hallyday, 2002
- Yannick Noah, 2009 & 2012
- Mylène Farmer, 2023

== Potential replacement ==
A new stadium named YelloPark was planned to replace the Stade de la Beaujoire, which was to be demolished for the 2024 Summer Olympics in Paris and the 2023 Rugby World Cup. On 26 February 2019, the project was cancelled.

== See also ==
- List of football stadiums in France
- Lists of stadiums
