= Éric Pécout =

French footballer (born 1956)

Personal information
- Date of birth: 17 February 1956 (age 70)
- Place of birth: Blois, Loir-et-Cher, France
- Height: 1.78 m (5 ft 10 in)
- Position: Forward

Senior career*
Years	Team	Apps	(Gls)
1974–1981	Nantes	156	(73)
1981–1983	Monaco	38	(17)
1983–1984	Metz	29	(8)
1984–1986	Strasbourg	54	(12)
1986–1988	Caen	50	(18)
1988–1989	Tours	2	(3)
Total		329	(131)

International career
1978	France Olympic	2	(0)
1979–1980	France	5	(1)
- * Club domestic league appearances and goals

Éric Pécout (born 17 February 1956) is a French former professional footballer who played as a forward. He obtained five caps (one goal) for the France national team.

== Titles ==
Nantes

- Division 1: 1976–77, 1979–80
- Coupe de France: 1978–79

Monaco

- Division 1: 1981–82

Metz

- Coupe de France: 1983–84
