= Ángel Marcos =

Argentine footballer and manager

Ángel Alberto Marcos
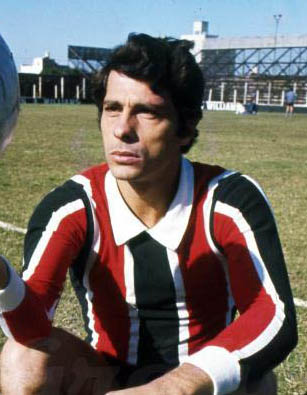
- Marcos in 1969

Personal information
- Date of birth: April 7, 1943 (age 83)
- Place of birth: Buenos Aires, Argentina
- Height: 1.74 m (5 ft 8 1/2 in)
- Position: Striker

Senior career*
| Years | Team | Apps | (Gls) |
| 1963–1966 | Ferro Carril Oeste | - | |
| 1966 | Nueva Chicago | - | |
| 1967–1971 | Chacarita Juniors | - | |
| 1971–1975 | Nantes | 82 | (34) |
| 1975–1978 | Toulouse | 86 | (38) |

International career
- Argentina

Managerial career
- 1977–1978: Toulouse
- Port-Gentil
- 1990–1993: La Rochelle
- 1993-1994: Ismaily
- Al Ain FC
- 1997-1998: Ismaily
- 1999–2001: Niort
- 2001: Lorient
- 2001–2003: Nantes
- 2008: Niort (Technical advisor)
- * Club domestic league appearances and goals

Ángel Marcos (born April 7, 1943) is an Argentine former football striker.

== Playing career ==
Marcos started his professional playing career in 1963 with Ferro Carril Oeste. He was part of the squad that won promotion to the Argentine Primera by winning the Primera B championship in 1963.

After a short spell with Nueva Chicago in 1966 Marcos joined Chacarita Juniors in 1967.

In the 1969 Metropolitano he was the captain and top scorer helping the team to win their only Argentine championship.

In 1971 Marcos joined Nantes and was part of the team that won the 1972-73 championship. He spent the last years of his playing career with Toulouse.

== Managerial career ==
He has managed several clubs in France after his playing career, including Toulouse, Niort, Lorient and Nantes. He has also coached in U.A.E and Egypt.

== Honours ==
| Season | Club | Title |
|---|---|---|
| 1963 | Ferro Carril Oeste | Argentine 2nd division |
| Metropolitano 1969 | Chacarita Juniors | Primera División Argentina |
| 1972–1973 | FC Nantes Atlantique | Ligue 1 |
