= Waldemar Kita =

Polish businessman

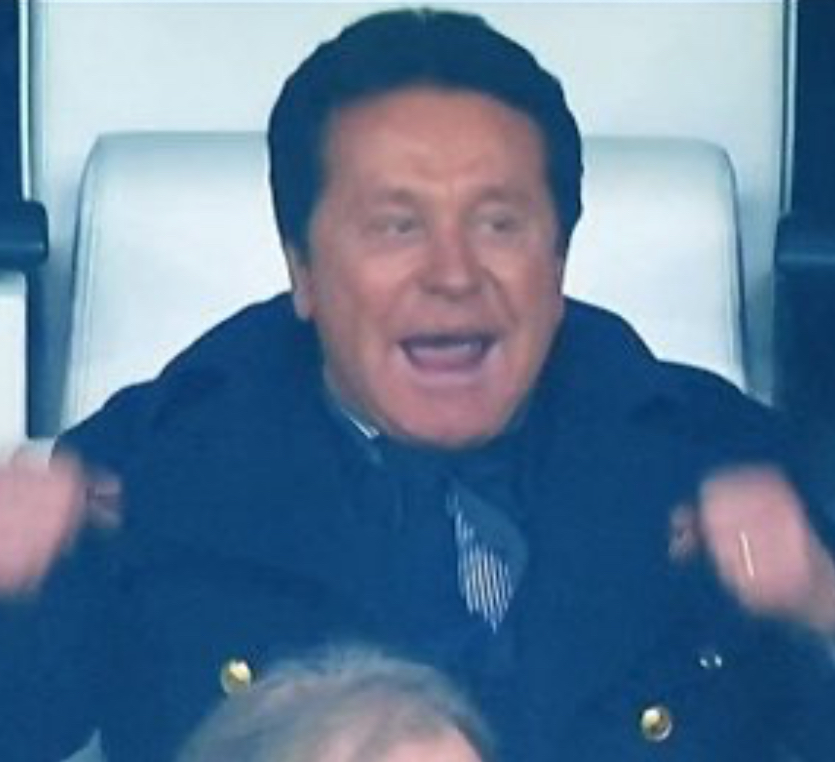
- Born: 7 May 1953 (age 72); Szczecin, Poland
- Occupations: Owner and president of FC Nantes (2007–present)

Waldemar Kita (born 7 May 1953) is a Polish businessman and owner of FC Nantes since 2007.

== Optics ==
Kita was born in Szczecin, Poland. He made his fortune by establishing Cornéal laboratories in 1986. The company grew to become the foremost French, and fourth largest European firm in designing and manufacturing intraocular lenses for cataract surgery and in the treatment of glaucoma. In December 2006, Kita sold Cornéal to Allergan for €180 million.

== Football ==
Kita is a passionate football fan. In 1998, he bought Swiss club FC Lausanne-Sport, which he led as the chairman up until 2001 when he sold the club.

In 2007, he then bought Ligue 1 club FC Nantes, an eight-time French football champion. Kita reportedly paid around €10 million for club the at the time financially strained club. He has been the chairman of the club ever since.

He was chosen as the best executive in French Football in 2014 by the prestigious magazine France Football.

== See also ==
- List of Poles
