= 2011–12 Lille OSC season =

Lille
2011–12 season
- President: Michel Seydoux
- Coach: Rudi Garcia
- Ground: Stadium Lille Métropole
- Ligue 1: 3rd
- Coupe de France: Round of 16
- Coupe de la Ligue: Quarter-finals
- UEFA Champions League: Group stage
- Top goalscorer: League: Eden Hazard (20); All: Eden Hazard (22)
- Highest home attendance: 17,921 vs Marseille (28 August 2011)
- Lowest home attendance: 15,274 vs CSKA Moscow (14 September 2011)
Home colours	Away colours

The 2011–12 season was Lille OSC's sixty-eighth season in existence and the club's twelfth consecutive season in the top flight of French football.

== Players ==
=== Squad ===
Note: Flags indicate national team as defined under FIFA eligibility rules; some limited exceptions apply. Players may hold more than one non-FIFA nationality.

No.	Pos.	Nation	Player
1	GK	FRA	Mickaël Landreau
2	DF	FRA	Mathieu Debuchy
3	DF	FRA	Lucas Digne
4	MF	FRA	Florent Balmont
5	MF	SEN	Idrissa Gueye
6	DF	SEN	Pape Souaré
7	FW	FRA	Dimitri Payet
9	FW	BRA	Túlio de Melo
10	MF	BEL	Eden Hazard
13	DF	FRA	Adama Soumaoro
14	DF	CZE	David Rozehnal
16	GK	NGR	Vincent Enyeama
17	MF	FRA	Benoît Pedretti
18	DF	FRA	Franck Béria

No.	Pos.	Nation	Player
19	FW	BEL	Gianni Bruno
20	MF	FRA	Ronny Rodelin
21	DF	FRA	Laurent Bonnart
22	DF	CMR	Aurélien Chedjou
23	FW	FRA	Nolan Roux
24	MF	FRA	Rio Mavuba (captain)
25	DF	MNE	Marko Baša
26	MF	ENG	Joe Cole
27	FW	POL	Ireneusz Jeleń
28	DF	ARG	Mauro Cetto
30	GK	CGO	Barel Mouko
40	GK	FRA	Alexandre Oukidja

=== Appearances and goals ===
No.	Pos.	Name	League 1		Coupe de France		Coupe de la Ligue		UEFA Champions League		Trophée des Champions		Total		Discipline	
No.	Pos.	Name	Apps	Goals	Apps	Goals	Apps	Goals	Apps	Goals	Apps	Goals	Apps	Goals	Yellow card	Red card
1	GK	(France) Mickaël Landreau	38	0	3	-2	0	0	5	0	1	-5	47	-46	1	0
2	DF	(France) Mathieu Debuchy	32	4	3	0	1	0	6	0	1	0	43	4	13	2
3	DF	(France) Lucas Digne	13(3)	0	1	0	1	0	0	0	0	0	18	0	1	0
4	MF	(France) Florent Balmont	30	2	1(1)	0	3	0	5	0	1	1	41	3	6	0
5	MF	(Senegal) Idrissa Gueye	14(10)	0	2(1)	0	2	0	1(2)	0	0(1)	0	33	0	5	1
6	DF	(Senegal) Pape Souaré	2(5)	0	0	0	1	0	0	0	0	0	8	0	1	0
7	FW	(France) Dimitri Payet	23(10)	6	1(2)	0	1(1)	0	1(3)	0	1	0	43	6	3	0
8	FW	(France) Moussa Sow	15(3)	6	0	0	0	0	6	3	1	1	25	10	1	0
9	FW	(Brazil) Túlio de Melo	10(6)	5	0	0	1	0	0(2)	1	0	0	19	6	4	1
10	MF	(Belgium) Eden Hazard	35(3)	20	3	1	1	0	6	0	1	1	49	22	3	0
11	MF	(Poland) Ludovic Obraniak	5(7)	2	0	0	1	0	1(4)	0	0(1)	0	19	2	2	0
13	DF	(France) Adama Soumaoro	0	0	0	0	0	0	0	0	0	0	0	0	0	0
14	DF	(Czech Republic) David Rozehnal	11(4)	1	1	0	1(1)	0	4	0	0	0	22	1	9	0
16	GK	(Nigeria) Vincent Enyeama	0	0	0	0	2	0	1	0	0	0	3	0	1	0
17	MF	(France) Benoît Pedretti	26(5)	4	2(1)	0	1	1	4	1	1	0	40	6	7	0
18	DF	(France) Franck Béria	32	0	2	0	0	0	6	0	1	0	41	0	11	0
19	FW	(Belgium) Gianni Bruno	0(10)	1	0(2)	1	0(1)	0	0	0	0	0	13	2	1	0
20	MF	(France) Ronny Rodelin	1(8)	0	0(2)	0	0(1)	0	0(1)	0	0(2)	0	15	0	0	0
21	DF	(France) Laurent Bonnart	7(4)	0	1	0	2	0	0(1)	0	0	0	15	0	2	0
22	DF	(Cameroon) Aurélien Chedjou	27	5	3	0	1	0	4	0	1	0	36	5	6	1
23	FW	(France) Nolan Roux	10(6)	5	1	1	0	0	0	0	0	0	17	6	1	0
24	MF	(France) Rio Mavuba	36(2)	1	2	0	1	0	6	0	1	0	48	1	5	0
25	DF	(Montenegro) Marko Baša	22	2	0	0	1	0	4	0	1	1	28	3	4	0
26	MF	(England) Joe Cole	20(11)	4	2(1)	3	2	2	5(1)	0	0	0	42	9	5	0
27	FW	(Poland) Ireneusz Jeleń	3(10)	1	2	2	1(1)	1	1(1)	0	0	0	19	4	1	0
28	DF	(Argentina) Mauro Cetto	6(1)	0	1	0	0	0	0	0	0	0	8	0	2	1
30	GK	(Republic of the Congo) Barel Mouko	0	0	0	0	0	0	0	0	0	0	0	0	0	0

== Transfers ==
=== In ===
No.	Pos.	Player	Transferred from	Date	Source	Notes
17	MF	(France) Benoît Pedretti	(France) Auxerre	2 June 2011		
16	GK	(Nigeria) Vincent Enyeama	(Israel) Hapoel Tel Aviv	12 June 2011		
20	FW	(France) Ronny Rodelin	(France) Nantes	13 June 2011		
25	DF	(Montenegro) Marko Baša	(Russia) Lokomotiv Moscow	23 June 2011		
23	CF	(France) Nolan Roux	(France) Stade Brest	21 January 2012		
7	FW	(France) Dimitri Payet	(France) Saint-Étienne	28 June 2011		
14	DF	(Czech Republic) David Rozehnal	(Germany) Hamburg	29 June 2011		
	FW	(France) Thomas Régnier	(France) Mulhouse	30 June 2011		
21	DF	(France) Laurent Bonnart	(France) Monaco	18 July 2011		
	FW	(Denmark) Emil Lyng	(Denmark) Nordsjælland	June 2011		Loan return
27	FW	(Poland) Ireneusz Jeleń	(France) Auxerre	30 August 2011		
20	FW	(Belgium) Gianni Bruno	(France) Lille B	8 June 2011		
3	DF	(France) Lucas Digne	(France) Lille B	27 July 2010		

=== Out ===
No.	Pos.	Player	Transferred to	Date	Fee	Source	Notes
	MF	(France) Pierre-Baptiste Baherlé	(France) Boulogna	1 June 2011	Undisclosed		
	FW	(France) Nicolas Fauvergue	(France) Sedan	14 June 2011	Undisclosed		
	GK	(France) Ludovic Butelle	(France) Arles-Avignon	24 June 2011	Free		
	FW	(France) Pierre-Alain Frau	(France) Caen	13 July 2011	Free		
	MF	(France) Yohan Cabaye	(England) Newcastle United	10 June 2011	£4.4		
	FW	(Denmark) Emil Lyng	(Switzerland) Lausanne-Sport	9 July 2011	Free		
	FW	(Ivory Coast) Gervinho	(England) Arsenal	12 July 2011	£10.5M		
	DF	(France) Adil Rami	(Spain) Valencia	See note ♠	£6		1
	DF	(Brazil) Emerson	(Portugal) Benfica	21 July 2011	Undisclosed		
	DF	(France) Peter Franquart	(Belgium) Mons	July 2011	Free		
	MF	(France) Stéphane Dumont	(France) Monaco	July 2011	Free		
	MF	(Poland) Ludovic Obraniak	(France) Bordeaux	January 2012	Undisclosed		

1 – Adil Rami was sold to Valencia on 3 January 2011 for an undisclosed fee. He remained on loan at Lille until the end of the 2010–11 season and returned to Valencia permanently on 13 June 2011

=== Loan in ===
No.	Pos.	Player	Loan from	Date	Source	Notes
26	MF	(England) Joe Cole	(England) Liverpool	31 August 2011		Until end of 2011–12 season
28	DF	(Argentina) Mauro Cetto	(Italy) Palermo	26 January 2012		Until end of 2011–12 season

=== Loan out ===
No.	Pos.	Player	Loan to	Date	Source	Notes
	DF	(France) Jerry Vandam	(France) Caen	5 July 2011		
	MF	(France) Arnaud Souquet	(France) Paris FC	July 2011		Until July 2012

== Preseason ==
9 July 2011 Friendly	Lille	1–1	Bordeaux	Stade Kéchiloa, Saint-Jean-de-Luz
16:30UTC	Hazard 6'	Report	Diabaté 27'

13 July 2011 Friendly	Lille	0–1	Reims
17:00UTC		Report	Tainmont 70'

16 July 2011 Friendly	Lille	2–0	Valenciennes	Domaine de Luchin, Camphin-en-Pévèle
16:00UTC	Payet 64'; Sow 22'	Report

23 July 2011 Friendly	Lille	0–1	Saint-Étienne	Stade Municipal, Le Chambon-sur-Lignon Le Chambon-sur-Lignon
16:00UTC		Report

== Competitions ==
=== Overview ===
Competition	Started round	Final position / round	First match	Last match
Trophée des Champions	Final	Runners-up	27 July 2011	
Ligue 1	—	3rd	6 August 2011	20 May 2012
Coupe de la Ligue	Round of 16	Quarter-finals	26 October 2011	11 January 2012
Coupe de France	Round of 32	Round of 16	7 January 2012	8 February 2012
UEFA Champions League	Group stage	Group stage	14 September 2011	7 December 2011

Updated to match played 20 May 2012
Source: Competitions

=== Trophée des Champions ===
27 July 2011 Final	Lille	4–5	Olympique de Marseille	Tangier, Morocco
20:45 CEST	Balmont 9'; Chedjou (yellow card) 40' (yellow-red card) 87'; Hazard 57'; Sow 72'; Pedretti (yellow card) 87'; Baša 90+2'	Report	A. Ayew 71', 90' (pen.), 90+5' (pen.); Morel (yellow card) 8' (goal) 85'; Rémy 87'	Stadium: Stade de Tanger; Attendance: 33,900; Referee: Bouchaïb El Ahrach

=== Ligue 1 ===
==== League table ====
Pos	Team	Pld	W	D	L	GF	GA	GD	Pts	Qualification or relegation
1	Montpellier (C)	38	25	7	6	68	34	+34	82	Qualification to Champions League group stage
2	Paris Saint-Germain	38	23	10	5	75	41	+34	79	Qualification to Champions League group stage
3	Lille	38	21	11	6	72	39	+33	74	Qualification to Champions League play-off round
4	Lyon	38	19	7	12	64	51	+13	64	Qualification to Europa League group stage (Note: Lyon won the 2011–12 Coupe de France and thus qualified for the group stage of the 2012–13 UEFA Europa League. Since they finished 4th, the spot for the Europa League play-off round goes to the fifth-placed team.)
5	Bordeaux	38	16	13	9	53	41	+12	61	Qualification to Europa League play-off round

Source: Ligue 1
Rules for classification: 1) points; 2) goal difference; 3) number of goals scored.
(C) Champions

==== Results summary ====
Overall								Home						Away					
Pld	W	D	L	GF	GA	GD	Pts	W	D	L	GF	GA	GD	W	D	L	GF	GA	GD
38	21	11	6	72	39	+33	74	12	5	2	48	23	+25	9	6	4	24	16	+8

Last updated: 20 May 2012.
Source: Competitive matches Ligue 1

==== Results by round ====
Round	1	2	3	4	5	6	7	8	9	10	11	12	13	14	15	16	17	18	19	20	21	22	23	24	25	26	27	28	29	30	31	32	33	34	35	36	37	38
Ground	A	H	A	H	A	H	A	H	A	H	A	H	A	H	A	H	A	H	A	H	A	H	A	H	A	H	A	H	A	H	A	H	A	H	A	H	A	H
Result	D	L	W	W	W	D	D	D	W	W	W	D	D	D	W	W	W	D	D	L	W	W	L	W	D	D	L	W	W	W	L	W	W	W	W	W	L	W
Position	12	14	10	7	3	4	6	6	5	4	3	3	3	3	3	3	3	3	3	3	3	3	3	3	3	3	3	3	3	3	3	3	3	3	3	3	3	3

Source: Ligue1.com
A = Away; H = Home; W = Win; D = Draw; L = Loss

==== Matches ====
6 August 2011 1	Nancy	1–1	Lille	Tomblaine
20:00 CEST (UTC+02)	Karaboué (yellow card) 24'; Diakité (yellow card) 37'; Béria 61' (o.g.); Berenguer (red card) 83'	Report	Pedretti (yellow card) 28'; Debuchy 47'; Souaré (yellow card) 53'; Baša (yellow card) 81'	Stadium: Stade Marcel Picot; Attendance: 15,060; Referee: Phillipe Kalt

14 August 2011 2	Lille	0–1	Montpellier	Villeneuve-d'Ascq
20:00 CEST (UTC+02)	Béria (yellow card) 23'; Obraniak (yellow card) 51'; Debuchy (yellow card) 90+1'	Report	Yanga-Mbiwa (yellow card) 23'; Bedimo (yellow card) 45'; Giroud 70'	Stadium: Stadium Nord Lille Métropole; Attendance: 16,304; Referee: Ruddy Buquet

1 August 2011 3	Caen	1–2	Lille	Caen
20:00 CEST (UTC+02)	Niang (yellow card) 20'; Seube (yellow card) 49'; Nivet 90' (pen.)	Report	Debuchy (yellow card) 28', (goal) 88'; Balmont (yellow card) 56'; Pedretti 69'; Obraniak (yellow card) 90'	Stadium: Stade Michel d'Ornano; Attendance: 16,938; Referee: Sébastien Moreira

28 August 2011 4	Lille	3–2	Marseille	Villeneuve-d'Ascq
20:00 CEST (UTC+02)	Sow 15', 75' (pen.); Mavuba (yellow card) 31'; Chedjou 66'; Gueye (yellow card) 79'	Report	A. Ayew (yellow card) 35'; Valbuena 57', 63', (yellow card) 63'; Fanni (yellow card) 74'; J. Ayew (yellow card) 90+2'	Stadium: Stadium Nord Lille Métropole; Attendance: 17,921; Referee: Clément Turpin

10 September 2011 5	Saint-Étienne	1–3	Lille	Saint-Étienne
18:00 CEST (UTC+02)	Rozehnal 8' (o.g.); Lemoine (yellow card) 13'; Néry (red card) 35'; Sako (yellow card) 84'	Report	Sow (yellow card) 39'; Hazard 55', 73'; Obraniak (yellow card) 66', (goal) 86'; Béria (yellow card) 70'; Debuchy (yellow card) 84'	Stadium: Stade Geoffroy-Guichard; Attendance: 23,061; Referee: Hervé Piccirillo

17 September 2011 6	Lille	2–2	Sochaux	Villeneuve-d'Ascq
20:00 CEST (UTC+02)	Debuchy (yellow card) 37' (yellow-red card) 55'; Mavuba (yellow card) 38'; Pedretti 49'; Hazard 78'		Peybernes (yellow card) 35'; Bakambu 70'; Butin (yellow card) 77'; Perquis (yellow card) 82'; Privat 86'	Stadium: Stadium Nord Lille Métropole; Attendance: 16,776; Referee: Jean-Charles Cailleux

20 September 2011 7	Bordeaux	1–1	Lille	Bordeaux
20:00 CEST (UTC+02)	Diabaté 8' (pen.), (yellow card) 89'; Chalmé (yellow card) 36'; Ben Khalfallah (yellow card) 88'	Report	Cole (yellow card) 56'; Hazard 57'; Landreau (yellow card) 80'; Rozehnal (yellow card) 89'	Stadium: Stade Chaban Delmas; Attendance: 17,927; Referee: Tony Chapron

24 September 2011 8	Lille	1–1	Lorient	Villeneuve-d'Ascq
18:00 CEST (UTC+02)	Rozehnal (yellow card) 11'; Cole 34'; Bonnart (yellow card) 90+2'	Report	Ecuele Manga (yellow card) 42'; Monnet-Paquet 90+3'	Stadium: Stadium Nord Lille Métropole; Attendance: 16,234; Referee: Alexandre Castro

2 October 2011 9	Lille	2–0	Rennes	Villeneuve-d'Ascq
18:00 CEST (UTC+02)	Sow 7'; Balmont 32', (yellow card) 58'; Gueye (yellow card) 90'	Report	Mavinga (yellow card) 23'; Tettey (yellow card) 31'; Kana Biyik (yellow card) 67'	Stadium: Stadium Nord Lille Métropole; Attendance: 16,802; Referee: Wilfried Bien

15 October 2011 10	Auxerre	1–3	Lille	Auxerre
18:00 CEST (UTC+02)	Oliech 36', (yellow card) 86'; Coulibaly (yellow card) 39'; Chafni (yellow card) 45'	Report	Payet 71'; Jeleń 82'; Béria (yellow card) 89'; Debuchy 90+4' (pen.)	Stadium: Stade de l'Abbé Deschamps; Attendance: 11,175; Referee: Laurent Duhamel

23 October 2011 11	Lille	3–1	Lyon	Villeneuve-d'Ascq
20:00 CEST (UTC+02)	Béria (yellow card) 37'; Sow 45'; Baša 64'; Balmont (yellow card) 68'; Cole 83'	Report	Briand 22'; Gonalons (yellow card) 31'; Källström (yellow card) 53'	Stadium: Stadium Nord Lille Métropole; Attendance: 17,247; Referee: Fredy Fautrel

30 October 2011 12	Valenciennes	0–0	Lille	Valenciennes
20:00 CEST (UTC+02)	Cohade (yellow card) 86'	Report	Debuchy (yellow card) 80'	Stadium: Stade du Hainaut; Attendance: 21,493; Referee: Ruddy Buquet

5 November 2011 13	Lille	1–1	Evian	Villeneuve-d'Ascq
20:00 CET (UTC+01)	Chedjou (yellow card) 30'; Pedretti 63'	Report	Khelifa 4', (yellow card) 59'; Cambon (yellow card) 26'; Tié Bi (yellow card) 40'; Ehret (yellow card) 74'	Stadium: Stadium Nord Lille Métropole; Attendance: 16,673; Referee: Benoît Millot

18 November 2011 14	Toulouse	0–0	Lille	Toulouse
20:00 CET (UTC+01)	Sissoko (yellow card) 11'; Sirieix (yellow card) 18'	Report	Rozehnal (yellow card) 34'	Stadium: Stadium Municipal; Attendance: 17,653; Referee: Clement Turpin

26 November 2011 15	Lille	2–0	Brest	Villeneuve-d'Ascq
20:00 CET (UTC+01)	Payet 11'; Rozehnal (yellow card) 68'; Sow 88'	Report	Ben Basat (yellow card) 6'; Lorenzi (yellow card) 58'	Stadium: Stadium Nord Lille Métropole; Attendance: 16,760; Referee: Pascal Vileo

3 December 2011 16	Ajaccio	2–3	Lille	Ajaccio
19:00 CET (UTC+01)	Kinkela 2'; Cavalli (yellow card) 25'; Ilan 37'; Mostefa (yellow card) 58'; Lippini (yellow card) 84'	Report	Obraniak 12'; Baša 16'; Balmont (yellow card) 25'; Hazard 80' (pen.), (yellow card) 89'	Stadium: Stade François Coty; Attendance: 5,319; Referee: Bartolomeu Varela

11 December 2011 17	Lille	2–0	Dijon	Villeneuve-d'Ascq
17:00 CET (UTC+01)	Sow 17'; Gueye (yellow card) 53'; Hazard 58'; Mavuba (yellow card) 76'	Report	Courgnaud (yellow card) 77'	Stadium: Stadium Nord Lille Métropole; Attendance: 16,726; Referee: Alexandre Castro

18 December 2011 18	Paris Saint-Germain	0–0	Lille	Paris
20:00 CET (UTC+01)	Camara (yellow card) 9'; Sissoko (yellow card) 63'; Ménez (yellow card) 70'	Report	Gueye (yellow card) 56'	Stadium: Parc des Princes; Attendance: 45,195; Referee: Clement Turpin

21 December 2011 19	Lille	4–4	Nice	Villeneuve-d'Ascq
19:00 CET (UTC+01)	Chedjou 9'; Cole 27'; Rozehnal (yellow card) 42'; Hazard 76'; Balmont 88'	Report	Civelli 16' (yellow card) 90+'; Mouloungui (yellow card) 30' (yellow-red card) 71'; Dja Djédjé 35', 45+'; Ospina (yellow card) 81'; Clerc 90+4'	Stadium: Stadium Nord Lille Métropole; Attendance: 16,847; Referee: Hervé Piccirillo

15 January 2012 20	Marseille	2–0	Lille	Marseille
21:00 CET (UTC+01)	Rémy 61', 83'; Morel (yellow card) 27'; Valbuena (yellow card) 72'; Diarra (yellow card) 81'	Report		Stadium: Stade Vélodrome; Attendance: 41,279; Referee: Ruddy Buquet

28 January 2012 21	Lille	3–0	Saint-Étienne	Villeneuve-d'Ascq
21:00 CET (UTC+01)	Rozehnal (yellow card) 27'; Hazard 50' (pen.); Roux 86', 87'	Report	Clément (yellow card) 14'; Ghoulam (yellow card) 80'	Stadium: Stadium Nord Lille Métropole; Attendance: 17,437; Referee: Pascal Vileo

12 February 2012 23	Lille	4–5	Bordeaux	Villeneuve-d'Ascq
15:00 CET (UTC+01)	Rozehnal 8'; Hazard 65'; Debuchy 75'; Pedretti (yellow card) 77'; Roux 90'	Report	Belay 2', 50'; Obraniak 17', 90+3'; Ciani (yellow card) 42'; Henrique (yellow card) 44'; Gouffran 60'; Sertic (yellow card) 90+1'	Stadium: Stadium Nord Lille Métropole; Attendance: 17,256; Referee: Fredy Fautrel

18 February 2012 24	Lorient	0–1	Lille	Lorient
19:00 CET (UTC+01)	Ecuele Manga (yellow card) 82'	Report	Cole (yellow card) 42'; Béria (yellow card) 72'; Debuchy 77'	Stadium: Stade du Moustoir; Attendance: 14,812; Referee: Wilfried Bien

22 February 2012 22	Sochaux	0–1	Lille	Montbéliard
18:30 CET (UTC+01)	Butin (yellow card) 24'; Perquis (yellow card) 45'	Report	Payet (yellow card) 10'; Roux 76'	Stadium: Stade Auguste Bonal; Attendance: 15,052; Referee: Benoît Millot

26 February 2012 25	Rennes	1–1	Lille	Rennes
21:00 CET (UTC+01)	Danzé (yellow card) 6'; Apam (yellow card) 37' (yellow-red card) 38'; Féret (yellow card) 90+1'; Erdinç 90'	Report	Digne (yellow card) 24'; Chedjou 40'; Gueye (yellow card) 45+1'; Debuchy (yellow card) 69'	Stadium: Stade de la Route de Lorient; Attendance: 19,834; Referee: Clément Turpin

3 March 2012 26	Lille	2–2	Auxerre	Villeneuve-d'Ascq
19:00 CET (UTC+01)	Cetto (yellow card) 27' (yellow-red card) 41'; Hazard 34', 63'	Report	Sahar 80'; Hengbart 84'	Stadium: Stadium Nord Lille Métropole; Attendance: 16,971; Referee: Alexandre Castro

10 March 2012 27	Lyon	2–1	Lille	Lyon
21:00 CET (UTC+01)	Lacazette 12'; López 38'; Dabo (yellow card) 52'; Lovren (yellow card) 55' (yellow-red card) 71'	Report	Chedjou 45+1'; Mavuba (yellow card) 65'	Stadium: Stade de Gerland; Attendance: 33,318; Referee: Saïd Ennjimi

18 March 2012 28	Lille	4–0	Valenciennes	Villeneuve-d'Ascq
21:00 CET (UTC+01)	Hazard 18'; Pedretti (yellow card) 22'; Angoua 57' (o.g.); Chedjou 69'; De Melo 83'	Report	Isimat-Mirin (yellow card) 37'; Camara (yellow card) 43'; Ducourtioux (yellow card) 45'	Stadium: Stadium Nord Lille Métropole; Attendance: 17,358; Referee: Hervé Piccirillo

24 March 2012 29	Evian	0–3	Lille	Annecy
19:00 CET (UTC+01)	Cambon (yellow card) 35'; Sorlin (yellow card) 52'	Report	Payet (yellow card) 30', (goal) 55'; Hazard 36', (yellow card) 50'; De Melo (yellow card) 57'; Béria (yellow card) 59'; Pedretti 67'	Stadium: Parc des Sports; Attendance: 12,248; Referee: Philippe Malige

1 April 2012 30	Lille	2–1	Toulouse	Villeneuve-d'Ascq
17:00 CEST (UTC+02)	Hazard 13'; Payet 32'; Pedretti (yellow card) 64'; Debuchy (yellow card) 67'	Report	M'Bengue (yellow card) 37'; Abdennour (yellow card) 44'; Aurier 60'; Regattin (yellow card) 63'; Sirieix (red card) 84'	Stadium: Stadium Nord Lille Métropole; Attendance: 17,057; Referee: Philippe Kalt

7 April 2012 31	Brest	3–1	Lille	Brest
19:00 CEST (UTC+02)	Daf 5'; Grougi 10' (pen.), (yellow card) 78'; Alphonse 53'; Jomâa (yellow card) 67'	Report	Payet 27', (yellow card) 53'; De Melo (yellow card) 53' (yellow-red card) 70'	Stadium: Stade Francis-Le Blé; Attendance: 12,917; Referee: Tony Chapron

15 April 2012 32	Lille	4–1	Ajaccio	Villeneuve-d'Ascq
17:00 CEST (UTC+02)	Poulard 16' (o.g.); Baša (yellow card) 17'; Béria (yellow card) 27'; Cole 37'; Mavuba (yellow card) 42'; Bruno 81'; Hazard 87' (pen.)	Report	Diawara (yellow card) 11'; André (yellow card) 61'; Cavalli (yellow card) 86'; Sammaritano 90+3'	Stadium: Stadium Nord Lille Métropole; Attendance: 16,887; Referee: Bartolomeu Varela

21 April 2012 33	Dijon	0–2	Lille	Dijon
19:00 CEST (UTC+02)	Koné (yellow card) 43'; Méïté (red card) 46'; Sankharé (yellow card) 70'; Kumordzi (red card) 77'	Report	Gueye (red card) 36'; Mavuba 39'; Hazard 45+1'; Baša (yellow card) 50'; Debuchy (yellow card) 61'; Bruno (yellow card) 67'; Chedjou (yellow card) 82'	Stadium: Stade Gaston Gérard; Attendance: 14,005; Referee: Ruddy Buquet

29 April 2012 34	Lille	2–1	Paris Saint-Germain	Villeneuve-d'Ascq
21:00 CEST (UTC+02)	Debuchy (yellow card) 27'; Hazard 71' (pen.); Roux 79'; Cole (yellow card) 82'	Report	Motta (yellow card) 3'; Pastore 48'; Tiéné (yellow card) 51'; Sakho (red card) 69'; Lugano (yellow card) 86'	Stadium: Stadium Nord Lille Métropole; Attendance: 17,262; Referee: Pascal Vileo

2 May 2012 35	Nice	0–1	Lille	Nice
19:00 CEST (UTC+02)	Gomis (yellow card) 54'; Monzón (yellow card) 90+1'	Report	De Melo 6' (yellow card) 36'; Debuchy (yellow card) 31'; Béria (yellow card) 83'	Stadium: Stade Municipal du Ray; Attendance: 10,570; Referee: Laurent Duhamel

7 May 2012 36	Lille	3–0	Caen	Villeneuve-d'Ascq
19:00 CEST (UTC+02)	De Melo 26' (pen.), 36'; Payet 60'	Summary	Thébaux (yellow card) 25'; Montaroup (yellow card) 55'; Frau (yellow card) 55'; Niang (yellow card) 85'	Stadium: Stadium Nord Lille Métropole; Attendance: 16,941; Referee: Wilfried Bien

13 May 2012 37	Montpellier	1–0	Lille	Montpellier
21:00 CEST (UTC+02)	Yanga-Mbiwa (yellow card) 13'; Bocaly (yellow card) 27'; Giroud (yellow card) 90+1'; Aït-Fana 90+4'	Report		Stadium: Stade de la Mosson; Attendance: 27,649; Referee: Fredy Fautrel

20 May 2012 38	Lille	4–1	Nancy	Villeneuve-d'Ascq
21:00 CEST (UTC+02)	Hazard 10', 27', 35' (pen.); De Melo 23'	Report	Lemaître 12'	Stadium: Stadium Nord Lille Métropole; Attendance: 17,000; Referee: Sebastien Desiage

=== Coupe de France ===
7 January 2012 Round of 64	Chantilly	0–6	Lille	Chantilly
20:45 CET (UTC+01)		Report	Cole 23', 59', 67'; Hazard 45' (pen.); Jeleń (yellow card) 31', (goal) 56', 77'	Stadium: Stade des Bourgognes

21 January 2012 Round of 32	Compiègne	0–1 (a.e.t.)	Lille	Compiègne
20:45 CET (UTC+01)		Report	Bruno 113'; Balmont (yellow card) 114'; Cole (yellow card) 115'	Stadium: Stade Paul Cosyns

8 February 2012 Round of 16	Valenciennes	2–1	Lille	Valenciennes
18:00 CET (UTC+01)	Mater (yellow card) 17'; Dossevi 71'; Aboubakar 78'	Report	Cetto (yellow card) 61'; Debuchy (yellow card) 69'; Chedjou (yellow card) 85'; Roux 88', (yellow card) 89'	Stadium: Stade du Hainaut; Referee: Bartolomeu Varela

=== Coupe de la Ligue ===
26 October 2011 Round of 16	Lille	3–1	Sedan	Villeneuve-d'Ascq
20:50 CEST (UTC+02)	Pedretti 34'; Cole 39'; De Melo (yellow card) 62'; Jeleń 70'; Enyeama (yellow card) 79'	Report	Dembélé (yellow card) 44'; Diaby 80' (pen.)	Stadium: Stade Lille-Metropole; Attendance: 17,016; Referee: Benoît Bastien

11 January 2012 Quarter-finals	Lyon	2–1	Lille	Lyon
20:50 CET (UTC+01)	Dabo (red card) 11'; Källström 41', (yellow card) 80'; López 65'	Report	Cole 28'; Bonnart (yellow card) 40'; Debuchy (yellow card) 51' (yellow-red card) 82'	Stadium: Stade de Gerland; Attendance: 29,124; Referee: Laurent Duhameld

=== UEFA Champions League ===
==== Group stage ====
Pos	Team	Pld	W	D	L	GF	GA	GD	Pts	Qualification	INT	CSKA	TRA	LIL
1	(Italy) Internazionale	6	3	1	2	8	7	+1	10	Advance to knockout phase	—	1–2	0–1	2–1
2	(Russia) CSKA Moscow	6	2	2	2	9	8	+1	8	Advance to knockout phase	2–3	—	3–0	0–2
3	(Turkey) Trabzonspor	6	1	4	1	3	5	−2	7	Transfer to Europa League	1–1	0–0	—	1–1
4	(France) Lille	6	1	3	2	6	6	0	6		0–1	2–2	0–0	—

Source: Soccerway

14 September 2011 1	Lille (France)	2–2	(Russia) CSKA Moscow	Villeneuve-d'Ascq, France
20:45	Sow 44'; Pedretti 57'	Report	Doumbia 72', 90'	Stadium: Stade Lille-Metropole; Attendance: 15,274; Referee: Olegário Benquerença (Portugal); Man of the Match: Balmont

27 September 2011 2	Trabzonspor (Turkey)	1–1	(France) Lille	Trabzon, Turkey
20:45	Colman 75' (pen.)	Report	Sow 30'	Stadium: Hüseyin Avni Aker Stadium; Attendance: 17,349; Referee: Björn Kuipers (Netherlands); Man of the Match: Balmont

18 October 2011 3	Lille (France)	0–1	(Italy) Internazionale	Villeneuve-d'Ascq, France
20:45		Report	Pazzini 21'	Stadium: Stade Lille-Metropole; Attendance: 16,996; Referee: Howard Webb (England); Man of the Match: Pazzini

2 November 2011 4	Internazionale (Italy)	2–1	(France) Lille	Milan, Italy
20:45	Samuel 18'; Milito 65'	Report	De Melo 83'	Stadium: San Siro; Attendance: 24,299; Referee: Wolfgang Stark (Germany); Man of the Match: Zanetti

22 November 2011 5	CSKA Moscow (Russia)	0–2	(France) Lille	Moscow, Russia
18:00		Report	V. Berezutski 49' (o.g.); Sow 64'	Stadium: Luzhniki Stadium; Attendance: 19,100; Referee: Pavel Královec (Czech Republic); Man of the Match: Hazard

22 November 2011 6	Lille (France)	0–0	(Turkey) Trabzonspor	Villeneuve-d'Ascq, France
20:45		Report		Stadium: Stade Lille-Metropole; Attendance: 16,375; Referee: Pedro Proença (Portugal); Man of the Match: Hazard
