= 2012–13 Lille OSC season =

Lille
2012–13 season
- President: Michel Seydoux
- Head Coach: Rudi Garcia
- Stadium: Grand Stade Lille Métropole
- Ligue 1: 6th
- Coupe de France: Round of 16
- Coupe de la Ligue: Semi-finals
- UEFA Champions League: Group stage
- Top goalscorer: League: Salomon Kalou (14); All: Salomon Kalou (16)
- Highest home attendance: 47,828 vs Marseille (14 April 2013)
- Lowest home attendance: 10,000 vs Nîmes (5 January 2013)
Home colours	Away colours

The 2012–13 season was Lille OSC's 69th season in existence and the club's 13th consecutive season in the top flight of French football.

This season marked the opening of the Grand Stade Lille Métropole, with a 50,000-seat capacity that went on to host several matches of UEFA Euro 2016.

== Players ==
=== Squad ===
Note: Flags indicate national team as defined under FIFA eligibility rules; some limited exceptions apply. Players may hold more than one non-FIFA nationality.

No.	Pos.	Nation	Player
3	DF	FRA	Lucas Digne
4	MF	FRA	Florent Balmont
5	MF	SEN	Idrissa Gueye
7	MF	FRA	Dimitri Payet
8	FW	CIV	Salomon Kalou
9	FW	BRA	Túlio de Melo
10	MF	FRA	Marvin Martin
11	FW	CPV	Ryan Mendes
13	DF	CIV	Adama Soumaoro
14	DF	CZE	David Rozehnal
15	DF	FRA	Djibril Sidibé
16	GK	FRA	Steeve Elana

No.	Pos.	Nation	Player
17	MF	FRA	Benoît Pedretti
18	DF	FRA	Franck Béria
19	FW	BEL	Gianni Bruno
20	FW	FRA	Ronny Rodelin
21	DF	FRA	Laurent Bonnart
22	DF	CMR	Aurélien Chedjou
24	MF	FRA	Rio Mavuba (captain)
25	DF	MNE	Marko Baša
26	FW	FRA	Nolan Roux
30	GK	CGO	Barel Mouko
33	FW	BEL	Divock Origi

=== Appearances and goals ===
No.	Pos	Nat	Player	Total		Ligue 1		Champions League		Coupe de France		Coupe de la Ligue	
No.	Pos	Nat	Player	Apps	Goals	Apps	Goals	Apps	Goals	Apps	Goals	Apps	Goals
Goalkeepers
16	GK	(France) FRA	Steeve Elana	28	0	20	0	2	0	3	0	3	0
30	GK	(Republic of the Congo) CGO	Barel Mouko	3	0	3	0	0	0	0	0	0	0
Defenders
3	DF	(France) FRA	Lucas Digne	44	3	31+2	2	6+1	1	2	0	1+1	0
14	DF	(Czech Republic) CZE	David Rozehnal	19	0	6+6	0	3+1	0	1	0	2	0
15	DF	(France) FRA	Djibril Sidibé	20	3	7+7	1	2+1	1	2	0	0+1	1
18	DF	(France) FRA	Franck Béria	35	0	24	0	6	0	1+1	0	3	0
21	DF	(France) FRA	Laurent Bonnart	8	0	4+1	0	0+1	0	1	0	1	0
22	MF	(Cameroon) CMR	Aurélien Chedjou	46	4	34	3	7	1	3	0	2	0
25	DF	(Montenegro) MNE	Marko Baša	45	5	34	5	6	0	3	0	2	0
Midfielders
4	MF	(France) FRA	Florent Balmont	44	3	30+4	2	7	0	1+1	1	1	0
5	FW	(Senegal) SEN	Idrissa Gueye	38	0	21+8	0	3+2	0	2	0	1+1	0
10	MF	(France) FRA	Marvin Martin	45	0	29+3	0	5+2	0	3	0	2+1	0
17	MF	(France) FRA	Benoît Pedretti	41	2	14+15	2	4+2	0	2+1	0	3	0
24	MF	(France) FRA	Rio Mavuba	26	0	17+2	0	4+1	0	1	0	1	0
29	MF	(France) FRA	Julien Michel	1	0	0	0	0	0	0	0	1	0
Forwards
7	FW	(France) FRA	Dimitri Payet	52	13	37+1	12	5+3	0	3	1	3	0
8	FW	(Ivory Coast) CIV	Salomon Kalou	37	14	25+3	13	7	1	1	0	1	0
9	FW	(Brazil) BRA	Túlio de Melo	32	3	4+19	1	4+2	1	2	1	0+1	0
11	FW	(Cape Verde) CPV	Ryan Mendes	12	2	3+6	2	1+2	0	0	0	0	0
19	FW	(Belgium) BEL	Gianni Bruno	18	2	3+10	0	2	1	1	0	1+1	1
20	FW	(France) FRA	Ronny Rodelin	32	4	20+3	3	2+1	0	2+1	0	1+2	1
26	FW	(France) FRA	Nolan Roux	44	11	22+10	8	3+5	0	2	2	1+1	1
33	FW	(Belgium) BEL	Divock Origi	10	1	0+10	1	0	0	0	0	0	0
Players who left the club during the season
1	GK	(France) FRA	Mickaël Landreau	21	0	15	0	6	0	0	0	0	0
2	DF	(France) FRA	Mathieu Debuchy	20	0	15	0	3	0	0	0	2	0
28	FW	(Greece) GRE	Victor Klonaridis	5	0	3	0	0	0	0+1	0	1	0

Source: Match reports in Competitive matches

=== Goal scorers ===
Rank.	Name	Ligue 1	Champions League	Coupe de France	Coupe de la Ligue	Total
1	(Ivory Coast) Salomon Kalou	13	1	0	0	14
2	(France) Dimitri Payet	12	0	1	0	13
3	(France) Nolan Roux	8	0	2	1	11
4	(Montenegro) Marko Baša	5	0	0	0	5
5	(Cameroon) Aurélien Chedjou	3	1	0	0	4
5	(France) Ronny Rodelin	3	0	0	1	4

Last updated: 26 May 2013
Source: Match reports in Competitive matches

== Transfers ==
=== In ===
No.	Pos.	Nat.	Name	Age	EU	Moving from	Type	Transfer window	Ends	Transfer fee	Source
10	MF	(France)	Marvin Martin	24	EU	Sochaux	Transfer	Summer	2017	€10M	LOSC
40	GK	(France)	Steeve Elana	32	EU	Brest	Transfer	Summer	2015	Free	Football
28	MF	(Belgium)	Viktor Klonaridis	19	EU	AEK Athens (Greece)	Transfer	Summer	2015	€0.8M	FFW
8	MF	(Ivory Coast)	Salomon Kalou	26	Non-EU	Chelsea (England)	Transfer	Summer	2016	Free	ESPN
15	MF	(France)	Djibril Sidibé	19	EU	Troyes	Transfer	Summer	2017	€2M	LOSC
11	MF	(Cape Verde)	Ryan Mendes	22	EU	Le Havre	Transfer	Summer	2016	€3M	France Football
	MF	(France)	Souahilo Meïté	18	EU	Auxerre	Transfer	Winter	2017		Yahoo Sports
	MF	(France)	Florian Thauvin	20	EU	Bastia	Transfer	Winter	2017	€3.5M	Sky Sports

=== Out ===
No.	Pos.	Nat.	Name	Age	EU	Moving to	Type	Transfer window	Transfer fee	Source
28	DF	(Argentina)	Mauro Cetto	30	Non-EU	Palermo (Italy)	Loan expiration	Summer	–	
26	MF	(England)	Joe Cole	30	EU	Liverpool (England)	Loan expiration	Summer	–	Liverpool FC
27	FW	(Poland)	Ireneusz Jeleń	31	EU	Podbeskidzie Bielsko-Biała (Poland)	End of contract	Summer	Free	Goal
10	MF	(Belgium)	Eden Hazard	21	EU	Chelsea (England)	Transfer	Summer	€40M	Sky Sports
	GK	(France)	Alexandre Oukidja	23	EU	Royal Mouscron-Péruwelz (Belgium)	Loan	Summer	Free	
	MF	(France)	Arnaud Souquet	20	EU	Royal Mouscron-Péruwelz (Belgium)	Loan	Summer	Free	
	FW	(Costa Rica)	John Jairo Ruiz	18	Non-EU	Royal Mouscron-Péruwelz (Belgium)	Loan	Summer	Free	
16	DF	(Nigeria)	Vincent Enyeama	29	Non-EU	Maccabi Tel Aviv (Israel)	Loan	Summer	Free	Business Day Online
6	DF	(Senegal)	Pape Souaré	22	Non-EU	Reims	Loan	Summer	Free	Soccer Fame
	FW	(Senegal)	Omar Wade	22	Non-EU	Royal Mouscron-Péruwelz (Belgium)	Loan	Summer	Free	
1	GK	(France)	Mickaël Landreau	33	EU	Bastia	Contract terminated	Winter	Free	Sky Sports
2	DF	(France)	Mathieu Debuchy	27	EU	Newcastle United (England)	Transfer	Winter	€5M	BBC
	DF	(France)	Jerry Vandam	24	EU	K.V. Mechelen (Belgium)	Transfer	Winter	Free	
	MF	(France)	Souahilo Meïté	18	EU	Auxerre	Loan	Winter	Free	
	FW	(Senegal)	Omar Wade	22	Non-EU	USJA Carquefou	Loan	Winter	Free	
	FW	(Belgium)	Viktor Klonaridis	20	EU	Royal Mouscron-Péruwelz (Belgium)	Loan	Winter	Free	
	MF	(France)	Florian Thauvin	20	EU	Bastia	Loan	Winter	Free	

== Club ==
=== Coaching staff ===
Position	Staff
Coach	Rudi Garcia
Assistant Coaches	Frédéric Bompard; Claude Fichaux
Goalkeeping Coach	Jean-Pierre Mottet
Physical Trainer	Grégory Dupont
Physiotherapist	Marc Cuvilier

Source: Ligue1.com

=== Board ===
Position	Staff
President CEO	Michel Seydoux
Assistant CEO	Frédéric Paquet; Didier de Climmer
Sporting Advisor to the President	Jean-Michel Vandamme
Legal Director	Julien Mordacq
Finance Director	Reynald Berghe
Communications Director	Aurélien Delespierre
Director B2B	Guillaume Gallo

Source: Ligue1.com

=== Kit ===
Supplier: Umbro
Sponsor(s): Groupe Partouche

Home	Away

Source: umbro.com

== Pre-season and friendlies ==
12 July 2012 Friendly	Le Havre	1–2	Lille	Le Havre, France
21:00	Mendes 88'		Pedretti 17', 43'	Stadium: Stade Océane; Referee: Olivier Thual

16 July 2012 Friendly	Lille	0–0	Benfica	Metz, France
20:30				Stadium: Stade Saint-Symphorien; Referee: Antony Gautier

21 July 2012 Friendly	Lille	1–0	ESTAC	Cambrai, France
19:00	Bruno 90'			Referee: Jean-Charles Cailleux

24 July 2012 Friendly	Lille	6–0	Mont-de-Marsan	Saint-Jean-de-Luz, France
19:00	Bruno 8', 65', 79'; Roux 18', 51'; Pedretti 53'

27 July 2012 Friendly	Lille	3–1	Athletic Bilbao	Dax, France
19:00	Baša 45'; Kalou 65'; De Melo 72'	Report	Ibai 66'

4 August 2012 Friendly	Rennes	0–1	Lille	Rennes, France
19:00			Roux 18'	Stadium: Stade de la Route de Lorient; Referee: Antony Gautier

== Competitions ==
=== Ligue 1 ===
==== League table ====
Pos	Team	Pld	W	D	L	GF	GA	GD	Pts	Qualification or relegation
4	Nice	38	18	10	10	57	46	+11	64	Qualification for the Europa League play-off round
5	Saint-Étienne	38	16	15	7	60	32	+28	63	Qualification for the Europa League third qualifying round (Note: Saint-Étienne, as winner of the 2012–13 Coupe de la Ligue, qualifies for the third qualifying round of 2013–14 UEFA Europa League.)
6	Lille	38	16	14	8	59	40	+19	62	
7	Bordeaux	38	13	16	9	40	34	+6	55	Qualification for the Europa League group stage (Note: Bordeaux, winner of the 2012–13 Coupe de France, qualified for the Group stage of 2013–14 UEFA Europa League.)
8	Lorient	38	14	11	13	57	58	−1	53	

Source: Ligue 1
Rules for classification: 1) points; 2) goal difference; 3) number of goals scored.

==== Results summary ====
Overall								Home						Away					
Pld	W	D	L	GF	GA	GD	Pts	W	D	L	GF	GA	GD	W	D	L	GF	GA	GD
38	16	14	8	59	40	+19	62	9	7	3	32	16	+16	7	7	5	27	24	+3

Last updated: 26 May 2013.
Source: Soccerway

==== Results by round ====
Round	1	2	3	4	5	6	7	8	9	10	11	12	13	14	15	16	17	18	19	20	21	22	23	24	25	26	27	28	29	30	31	32	33	34	35	36	37	38
Ground	A	H	A	H	A	H	A	H	A	H	A	H	A	A	H	A	H	A	H	A	H	A	H	A	H	A	H	A	H	A	H	H	A	H	A	H	A	H
Result	W	D	D	L	D	D	L	W	D	W	W	W	L	L	D	D	W	D	W	D	L	L	D	W	W	W	W	W	L	W	W	D	W	D	L	W	D	D
Position	3	6	8	11	11	12	15	10	11	10	8	7	8	9	10	11	10	11	8	8	10	11	10	10	10	8	7	6	6	5	5	6	5	5	6	4	5	6

Source: Soccerway
A = Away; H = Home; W = Win; D = Draw; L = Loss

==== Matches ====
11 August 2012 1	Saint-Étienne	1–2	Lille	Saint-Étienne
21:00	Guilavogui (yellow card) 11'; Hamouma 74'; Ghoulam (yellow card) 37'	Report	Balmont (yellow card) 51'; Chedjou 58'; Debuchy (yellow card) 79'; Pedretti 90'	Stadium: Stade Geoffroy-Guichard; Attendance: 21,197; Referee: Lionel Jaffredo

17 August 2012 2	Lille	1–1	Nancy	Villeneuve d'Ascq
21:45	Kalou 43'; Digne (yellow card) 55'; De Melo (yellow card) 72'	Report	Bakar 35'; Moukandjo (yellow card) 44' (yellow-red card) 79'; Mollo (yellow card) 56'; André Luiz (yellow card) 88'	Stadium: Grand Stade Lille Métropole; Attendance: 44,460; Referee: Wilfried Bien

25 August 2012 3	Nice	2–2	Lille	Nice
17:00	Pejčinović 43'; Bauthéac (yellow card) 45', (goal) 55'	Report	Payet 36'; Sidibé 59'	Stadium: Stade du Ray; Attendance: 8,768; Referee: Sébastien Moreira

2 September 2012 4	Lille	1–2	Paris SG	Villeneuve d'Ascq
21:00	Chedjou 12'; Roux (yellow card) 61'	Report	Ibrahimović 1', 21'; Verratti (yellow card) 33'; Motta (yellow card) 45'	Stadium: Grand Stade Lille Métropole; Attendance: 32,707; Referee: Ruddy Buquet

15 September 2012 5	Troyes	1–1	Lille	Troyes
17:00	Camus (yellow card) 81'; Grax 88'	Report	Payet 38'; Pedretti (yellow card) 70'	Stadium: Stade de l'Aube; Attendance: 11,213; Referee: Jean-Charles Cailleux

23 September 2012 6	Lille	1–1	Lyon	Villeneuve d'Ascq
21:00	Roux 7'; Gueye (yellow card) 20'; Bruno (yellow card) 90+3'	Report	López 88'	Stadium: Grand Stade Lille Métropole; Attendance: 43,475; Referee: Clément Turpin

28 September 2012 7	Rennes	2–0	Lille	Rennes
20:45	Boye (yellow card) 25'; Féret 64'; Alessandrini 75'	Report	Gueye (yellow card) 18'; Baša (yellow card) 86'	Stadium: Stade de la Route de Lorient; Attendance: 17,111; Referee: Nicolas Rainville

6 October 2012 8	Lille	2–0	Ajaccio	Villeneuve d'Ascq
20:00	Roux 42'; Mendes 56'; De Melo (yellow card) 59'; Balmont (yellow card) 66'	Report	Mutu (yellow card) 3'	Stadium: Grand Stade Lille Métropole; Attendance: 39,375; Referee: Lionel Jaffredo

19 October 2012 9	Bordeaux	1–1	Lille	Bordeaux
20:45	Obraniak 18'; Marange (yellow card) 27'; Planus (yellow card) 45'	Report	Martin (yellow card) 49'; Béria (yellow card) 54'; Baša 90+3'	Stadium: Stade Chaban-Delmas; Attendance: 19,884; Referee: Ruddy Buquet

27 October 2012 10	Lille	2–1	Valenciennes	Villeneuve d'Ascq
17:00	Bong 2' (o.g.); Martin (yellow card) 22'; Payet 41'; Chedjou (yellow card) 78'	Report	Sánchez (yellow card) 26' (yellow-red card) 29'; Le Tallec 71'	Stadium: Grand Stade Lille Métropole; Attendance: 45,497; Referee: Fredy Fautrel

3 November 2012 11	Evian	0–2	Lille	Annecy
20:00	Mensah (yellow card) 38'; Dja Djédjé (yellow card) 56'	Report	Roux 40'; Balmont 62'; Martin (yellow card) 71'	Stadium: Parc des Sports; Attendance: 9,171; Referee: Amaury Delerue

10 November 2012 12	Lille	1–0	Brest	Villeneuve d'Ascq
17:00	Chedjou (yellow card) 41'; Kalou 45'; Landreau (yellow card) 90+3'	Report	Baysse (yellow card) 38'; Mendy (yellow card) 45+2'; Lesoimier (yellow card) 83'	Stadium: Grand Stade Lille Métropole; Attendance: 39,256; Referee: Jean-Charles Cailleux

16 November 2012 13	Lorient	2–0	Lille	Lorient
20:45	Baca (yellow card) 18'; Bourillon 24'; Koné (yellow card) 31'; Corgnet 69'	Report	Debuchy (yellow card) 36'; Kalou (yellow card) 65'; Balmont (yellow card) 80'	Stadium: Stade du Moustoir; Attendance: 14,271; Referee: Olivier Thual

25 November 2012 14	Marseille	1–0	Lille	Marseille
21:00	Barton (yellow card) 22'; J. Ayew (yellow card) 42', (goal) 46'; Kaboré (yellow card) 55'; A. Ayew (yellow card) 57'	Report	Baša (yellow card) 18'; Payet (yellow card) 45+2'; Balmont (red card) 45+2'; Chedjou (yellow card) 51'	Stadium: Stade Vélodrome; Attendance: 32,470; Referee: Laurent Duhamel

1 December 2012 15	Lille	0–0	Bastia	Villeneuve d'Ascq
20:00	Martin (yellow card) 37'; Roux (yellow card) 90+2'	Report	Palmieri (yellow card) 41'; Bonnefoi (yellow card) 84'; Thauvin (yellow card) 90+5'	Stadium: Grand Stade Lille Métropole; Attendance: 38,304; Referee: Nicolas Rainville

8 December 2012 16	Sochaux	1–1	Lille	Montbéliard
20:00	Pujol (yellow card) 49' (yellow-red card) 79'; Mikari 64', (yellow card) 65'	Report	Pedretti (yellow card) 60'; Roux 62'; Gueye (yellow card) 82'; Mendes (yellow card) 90+5'	Stadium: Stade Auguste Bonal; Attendance: 8,948; Referee: Philippe Kalt

11 December 2012 17	Lille	2–0	Toulouse	Villeneuve d'Ascq
21:00	Baša 55'; Payet (yellow card) 73', (goal) 83'; Roux (yellow card) 76'	Report	Akpa Akpro (yellow card) 33'; Zebina (yellow card) 37'	Stadium: Grand Stade Lille Métropole; Attendance: 35,264; Referee: Sébastien Moreira

15 December 2012 18	Reims	1–1	Lille	Reims
20:00	Weber 7'; Krychowiak (yellow card) 23'; Tacalfred (yellow card) 90'	Report	Payet 72'; Chedjou (yellow card) 83'	Stadium: Stade Auguste Delaune; Attendance: 14,093; Referee: Alexandre Castro

22 December 2012 19	Lille	4–1	Montpellier	Villeneuve d'Ascq
17:00	Kalou (yellow card) 20'; Congre 25' (o.g.); Payet 43'; Roux 62'; Mendes 74'	Report	Dabo (yellow card) 11'; Cabella (yellow card) 33'; Belhanda (red card) 45+1'; Camara 82'	Stadium: Grand Stade Lille Métropole; Attendance: 44,735; Referee: Mikael Lesage

12 January 2013 20	Nancy	2–2	Lille	Tomblaine
20:00	Grange 21'; Sané (yellow card) 79'; Ayasse 82'; Lotiès (yellow card) 85'	Report	Roux 1'; Martin (yellow card) 19'; Payet 32'; Béria (yellow card) 90+2'	Stadium: Stade Marcel Picot; Attendance: 13,709; Referee: Bartolomeu Varela

20 January 2013 21	Lille	0–2	Nice	Villeneuve d'Ascq
17:00	Martin (yellow card) 69'	Report	Civelli 77', (yellow card) 80'; Maupay 86'	Stadium: Grand Stade Lille Métropole; Attendance: 38,671; Referee: Wilfried Bien

27 January 2013 22	Paris SG	1–0	Lille	Paris
21:00	Motta (yellow card) 18'; Chedjou 68' (o.g.); Lavezzi (yellow card) 87'; Verratti (yellow card) 87'	Report	Martin (yellow card) 40'; Pedretti (yellow card) 66'; Digne (yellow card) 90+3'	Stadium: Parc des Princes; Attendance: 42,029; Referee: Fredy Fautrel

2 February 2013 23	Lille	1–1	Troyes	Villeneuve d'Ascq
20:00	Sidibé (yellow card) 40'; Origi 74'; Bruno (yellow card) 90+2'	Report	Camus 30'; Bahebeck (yellow card) 34'	Stadium: Grand Stade Lille Métropole; Attendance: 36,315; Referee: Nicolas Rainville

10 February 2013 24	Lyon	1–3	Lille	Lyon
21:00	Biševac (yellow card) 49'; López 57', (yellow card) 82'; Gonalons (yellow card) 84'; Fofana (yellow card) 89'	Report	Chedjou 28'; Balmont 45'; Kalou 50' (pen.)	Stadium: Stade de Gerland; Attendance: 30,705; Referee: Laurent Duhamel

15 February 2013 25	Lille	2–0	Rennes	Villeneuve d'Ascq
20:30	Mavinga 24' (o.g.); Payet 61'; Martin (yellow card) 82'	Report	Makoun (yellow card) 64'	Stadium: Grand Stade Lille Métropole; Attendance: 36,929; Referee: Jean-Charles Cailleux

23 February 2013 26	Ajaccio	1–3	Lille	Ajaccio
20:00	Belghazouani 77'	Report	Poulard 38' (o.g.); Balmont (yellow card) 39'; Digne (red card) 61'; Payet 67', 74'	Stadium: Stade François Coty; Attendance: 5,873; Referee: Benoît Bastien

2 March 2013 27	Lille	2–1	Bordeaux	Villeneuve d'Ascq
21:00	Béria (yellow card) 30'; Rodelin 59'; Kalou 72'	Report	Plašil 31' (pen.); Traoré (yellow card) 32'	Stadium: Grand Stade Lille Métropole; Attendance: 40,409; Referee: Ruddy Buquet

9 March 2013 28	Valenciennes	1–3	Lille	Valenciennes
20:00	Melikson 24'; Ducourtioux (yellow card) 86'	Report	Martin (yellow card) 53'; Rodelin 55'; De Melo 82'; Pedretti 89'	Stadium: Stade du Hainaut; Attendance: 18,451; Referee: Olivier Thual

16 March 2013 29	Lille	1–2	Evian	Villeneuve d'Ascq
21:00	Kalou 9'; Gueye (yellow card) 89'; Sidibé (yellow card) 90+2'	Report	Barbosa (yellow card) 17'; Khlifa 30'; Kalou 67' (o.g.); Sagbo (yellow card) 69'	Stadium: Grand Stade Lille Métropole; Attendance: 38,683; Referee: Bartolomeu Varela

30 March 2013 30	Brest	1–2	Lille	Brest
17:00	Raspentino 10'; Kantari (yellow card) 61'; Chafni (yellow card) 63'	Report	Kalou 18'; Roux 78'; Digne (yellow card) 86'	Stadium: Stade Francis-Le Blé; Attendance: 11,838; Referee: Tony Chapron

7 April 2013 31	Lille	5–0	Lorient	Villeneuve d'Ascq
21:00	Kalou 3', 33'; Payet 8'; Digne 31' (pen.); Rodelin 53'	Report	Manga (yellow card) 31'; Lautoa (yellow card) 42'; Lemina (yellow card) 89'	Stadium: Grand Stade Lille Métropole; Attendance: 38,574; Referee: Ruddy Buquet

13 April 2013 32	Lille	0–0	Marseille	Villeneuve d'Ascq
21:00	Balmont (yellow card) 67'	Report	Barton (yellow card) 90+1'	Stadium: Grand Stade Lille Métropole; Attendance: 47,828; Referee: Wilfried Bien

21 April 2013 33	Bastia	1–2	Lille	Bastia
14:00	Khazri (yellow card) 9', (goal) 47'; Faty (yellow card) 36'; Yatabaré (yellow card) 74'	Report	Balmont (yellow card) 41'; Payet (yellow card) 45+1'; Digne 85'; Baša 90+2'	Stadium: Stade Armand Cesari; Attendance: 14,436; Referee: Bartolomeu Varela

27 April 2013 34	Lille	3–3	Sochaux	Villeneuve d'Ascq
20:30	Kalou 26', 45+2'; Baša 48'	Report	Boudebouz (yellow card) 29'; Pouplin (yellow card) 42'; Kante 79'; Nogueira 84', 87'	Stadium: Grand Stade Lille Métropole; Attendance: 41,306; Referee: Philippe Kalt

4 May 2013 35	Toulouse	4–2	Lille	Toulouse
20:00	Ben Yedder 20'; Didot 32'; Hermach (yellow card) 37'; Braaten 56'; Aurier (yellow card) 75'; Ben Basat 89'	Report	Baša 38'; Kalou 48'	Stadium: Stadium Municipal; Attendance: 14,202; Referee: Tony Chapron

11 May 2013 36	Lille	3–0	Reims	Villeneuve d'Ascq
20:30	Kalou 20', 77'; Balmont (yellow card) 32'; Payet 49'; Béria (yellow card) 63'	Report	Souaré (yellow card) 37'; Diego (yellow card) 45+1'; Devaux (yellow card) 83'	Stadium: Grand Stade Lille Métropole; Attendance: 43,684; Referee: Benoît Millot

18 May 2013 37	Montpellier	0–0	Lille	Montpellier
21:00	Belhanda (yellow card) 12'	Report	Martin (yellow card) 11'; Sidibé (yellow card) 61'; Béria (yellow card) 78'; Pedretti (red card) 90+2'	Stadium: Stade de la Mosson; Attendance: 17,561; Referee: Fredy Fautrel

26 May 2013 38	Lille	1–1	Saint-Étienne	Villeneuve d'Ascq
21:00	Kalou 42'; Gueye (yellow card) 66'; Roux (yellow card) 89'	Report	Guilavogui (yellow card) 29' (yellow-red card) 67'; Lemoine (yellow card) 44'; Hamouma 59'; Cohade (yellow card) 62'	Stadium: Grand Stade Lille Métropole; Attendance: 45,931; Referee: Ruddy Buquet

=== UEFA Champions League ===
==== Play-off round ====
21 August 2012 First leg	Copenhagen (Denmark)	1–0	(France) Lille	Copenhagen, Denmark
20:45	Santin 38'	Report	Rozehnal (yellow card) 68'; Roux (yellow card) 77'	Stadium: Parken Stadium; Attendance: 15,654; Referee: Marijo Strahonja (Croatia)

29 August 2012 Second leg	Lille (France)	2–0 (a.e.t.) (2–1 agg.)	(Denmark) Copenhagen	Villeneuve-d'Ascq, France
20:45	Digne 44'; De Melo 105'	Report		Stadium: Grand Stade Lille Métropole; Attendance: 42,977; Referee: Pavel Královec (Czech Republic)

==== Group stage ====
Group F
Pos	Team	Pld	W	D	L	GF	GA	GD	Pts	Qualification	BAY	VAL	BATE	LIL
1	(Germany) Bayern Munich	6	4	1	1	15	7	+8	13 (Note: Head-to-head points: Bayern Munich 4, Valencia 1.)	Advance to knockout phase	—	2–1	4–1	6–1
2	(Spain) Valencia	6	4	1	1	12	5	+7	13	Advance to knockout phase	1–1	—	4–2	2–0
3	(Belarus) BATE Borisov	6	2	0	4	9	15	−6	6	Transfer to Europa League	3–1	0–3	—	0–2
4	(France) Lille	6	1	0	5	4	13	−9	3		0–1	0–1	1–3	—

Source: Soccerway
Notes:

19 September 2012 1	Lille (France)	1–3	(Belarus) BATE Borisov	Villeneuve d'Ascq, France
20:45 CEST	Payet (yellow card) 11'; Digne (yellow card) 53'; Roux (yellow card) 54'; Chedjou 60'; Mavuba (yellow card) 90'	Report	Valadzko 6'; Rodionov 20', (yellow card) 38'; Alyakhnovich (yellow card) 28', (goal) 43'; Pavlov (yellow card) 54'; Palyakow (yellow card) 70'	Stadium: Grand Stade Lille Métropole; Attendance: 38,122; Referee: Marcin Borski (Poland)

2 October 2012 2	Valencia (Spain)	2–0	(France) Lille	Valencia, Spain
20:45 CEST	Soldado (yellow card) 14'; Barragán (yellow card) 33'; Jonas 38', 75', (yellow card) 80'	Report	Debuchy (yellow card) 43' (yellow-red card) 86'; Pedretti (yellow card) 71'	Stadium: Mestalla Stadium; Attendance: 28,517; Referee: Gianluca Rocchi (Italy)

23 October 2012 3	Lille (France)	0–1	(Germany) Bayern Munich	Villeneuve d'Ascq, France
20:45 CEST	Sidibé (yellow card) 33'; Pedretti (yellow card) 45+1'; Digne (yellow card) 52'	Report	Müller 20' (pen.); Boateng (yellow card) 32'; Martínez (yellow card) 45'; Mandžukić (yellow card) 70'; Shaqiri (yellow card) 90+1'; Schweinsteiger (yellow card) 90+3'	Stadium: Grand Stade Lille Métropole; Attendance: 45,259; Referee: Martin Atkinson (England)

7 November 2012 4	Bayern Munich (Germany)	6–1	(France) Lille	Munich, Germany
20:45 CET	Schweinsteiger 5', (yellow card) 64'; Pizarro 18', 28', 33'; Robben 23'; Kroos 66'; Ribéry (yellow card) 72'; Tymoshchuk (yellow card) 78'	Report	Debuchy (yellow card) 21'; Kalou 58'; Balmont (yellow card) 63'; Mavuba (yellow card) 77'	Stadium: Allianz Arena; Attendance: 68,000; Referee: Ovidiu Alin Hategan (Romania

20 November 2012 5	BATE Borisov (Belarus)	0–2	(France) Lille	Minsk, Belarus
20:45 CET	Bressan (yellow card) 45'; Radzkow (yellow card) 90+4'	Report	Sidibé 14', (yellow card) 48' (yellow-red card) 74'; Bruno 31', (yellow card) 32'; Pedretti (yellow card) 87'	Stadium: Dynama Stadium; Attendance: 22,810; Referee: Marijo Strahonja (Croatia)

5 December 2012 6	Lille (France)	0–1	(Spain) Valencia	Villeneuve d'Ascq, France
20:45 CET	Mavuba (yellow card) 35'; Béria (yellow card) 52'; Balmont (yellow card) 55'	Report	Jonas 36' (pen.); T. Costa (yellow card) 81'; Guaita (yellow card) 82'	Stadium: Grand Stade Lille Métropole; Attendance: 40,036; Referee: Aleksandar Stavrev (Macedonia)

=== Coupe de la Ligue ===
30 October 2012 Round of 16	Lille	1–0 (a.e.t.)	Toulouse	Villeneuve d'Ascq
20:50	Béria (yellow card) 64'; Roux 117'	Report	Sirieix (yellow card) 48'; Yago (yellow card) 59' (yellow-red card) 87'; Akpa Akpro (yellow card) 65'	Stadium: Grand Stade Lille Métropole; Attendance: 21,655; Referee: Laurent Duhamel

28 November 2012 Quarter-finals	Bastia	0–3	Lille	Bastia
18:45	Palmieri (yellow card) 51'; Khazri (yellow card) 73'	Report	Bruno 10'; Rodelin 62'; Sidibé 84'	Stadium: Stade Armand Cesari; Attendance: 6,910; Referee: Tony Chapron

15 January 2013 Semi-finals	Saint-Étienne	0–0 (a.e.t.) (7–6 p)	Lille	Saint-Étienne
20:55	Lemoine (yellow card) 45+1'; Sall (yellow card) 56'	Report	Chedjou (yellow card) 45'; Béria (yellow card) 99'	Stadium: Stade Geoffroy-Guichard; Attendance: 23,011; Referee: Clement Turpin
	Penalties
	Cohade (penalty scored); Mollo (penalty missed); Perrin (penalty scored); Mayi (penalty scored); Aubameyang (penalty scored); Guilavogui (penalty scored); Clément (penalty scored); Clerc (penalty scored)		(penalty scored) Chedjou; (penalty scored) Baša; (penalty scored) Bruno; (penalty missed) Balmont; (penalty scored) Mavuba; (penalty scored) Béria; (penalty missed) Gueye

=== Coupe de France ===
5 January 2013 Round of 64	Lille	3–2	Nîmes	Villeneuve d'Ascq
20:45	Payet 7'; Balamont 44'; Roux 52'	Report	Gragnic 61'; Koné 70'; Poulain (yellow card) 86'; Tarek Bensaïd (yellow card) 87'; Haddou (red card) 89'	Stadium: Grand Stade Lille Métropole; Attendance: 10,000; Referee: Ruddy Buquet

24 January 2013 Round of 32	Stade Plabennecois	1–3	Lille	Plabennec
20:55	Pelletier 28'; Laot (yellow card) 48'; Kernevez (yellow card) 80'	Report	Kernevez 31' (o.g.); Roux 48', (yellow card) 63'; De Melo 67'	Stadium: Stade de Kervéguen; Attendance: 9,753; Referee: Philippe Kalt

26 February 2013 Round of 16	Saint-Étienne	3–2	Lille	Saint-Étienne
20:50	Bodmer (yellow card) 38'; Chedjou 44' (o.g.); Aubameyang 50'; Brandão 75'	Report	Baša 33'; Bruno (yellow card) 40'; Kalou 82'; Payet (yellow card) 90+3'	Stadium: Stade Geoffroy-Guichard; Attendance: 15,543; Referee: Lionel Jaffredo
