= 2011 Trophée des Champions =

Lille	Marseille
Ligue 1	Ligue 1
4	5
- Date: 27 July 2011
- Venue: Stade de Tanger, Tanger, Morocco
- Referee: Bouchaïb El Ahrach (Morocco)
- Attendance: 33,900
- Weather: Clear; 26 °C (79 °F)

The 2011 Trophée des champions (English: 2011 Champions Trophy) was the 16th edition of the French super cup. The match was to be contested by the winners of Ligue 1 the previous season, Lille, and the defending Coupe de France champions. However, due to Lille also winning the Coupe de France the previous season, the club faced the runners-up of the previous league campaign Marseille. The match was played, for the third consecutive season, on international soil at the Stade de Tanger in Tanger, Morocco. Like the previous two seasons, the idea was to promote French football abroad, but this time more specifically in Africa and the Arab world. The match was televised live on Canal+ in France and throughout 77 countries in the world, a new record for country viewership. On 21 July 2011, it was confirmed by the Ligue de Football Professionnel that Bouchaïb El Ahrach would officiate the match. Marseille trailed Lille by 3–1 with five minutes to go but came back to win 5–4.

== Match details ==
27 July 2011
19:45 WEST

Lille	4–5	Marseille
Balmont 9'; Hazard 57'; Sow 72'; Baša 90+2'	Report	A. Ayew 71', 90' (pen.), 90+5' (pen.); Morel 85'; Rémy 87'

Stade de Tanger, Tanger
Attendance: 33,900
Referee: Bouchaïb El Ahrach (Morocco)

Lille	Marseille

GK	1	(France) Mickaël Landreau
RB	2	(France) Mathieu Debuchy
CB	25	(Montenegro) Marko Baša
CB	22	(Cameroon) Aurélien Chedjou	(yellow card) 40' (yellow-red card) 89'
LB	17	(France) Benoît Pedretti	(yellow card) 87'
CM	24	(France) Rio Mavuba (c)
CM	4	(France) Florent Balmont		(substituted off) 90+2'
RW	18	(France) Franck Béria
AM	7	(France) Dimitri Payet		(substituted off) 68'
LW	26	(Belgium) Eden Hazard		(substituted off) 81'
CF	8	(Senegal) Moussa Sow
Substitutes:
GK	16	(Nigeria) Vincent Enyeama
DF	6	(Senegal) Pape Souaré
DF	14	(Czech Republic) David Rozehnal
MF	5	(Senegal) Idrissa Gueye		(substituted on) 81'
MF	10	(Poland) Ludovic Obraniak		(substituted on) 68'
FW	20	(France) Ronny Rodelin		(substituted on) 90+2'
FW	33	(Senegal) Omar Wade
Manager:
Rudi Garcia

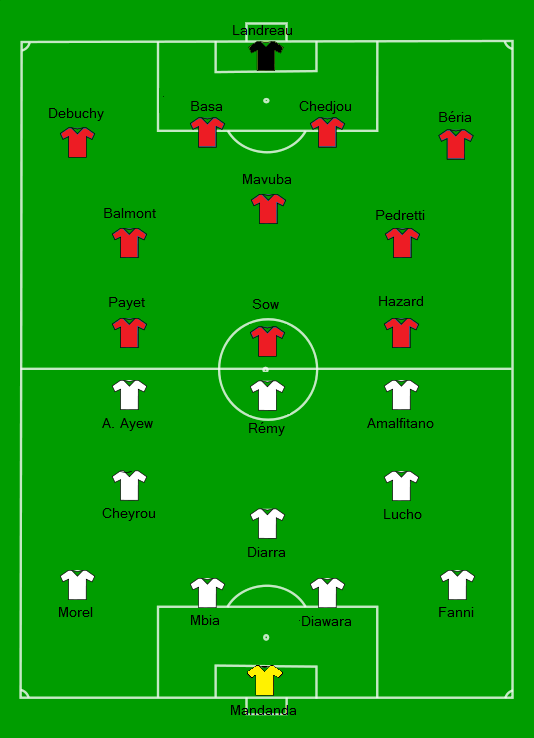

GK	30	(France) Steve Mandanda (c)
CB	7	(France) Benoît Cheyrou		(substituted off) 66'
CB	4	(France) Alou Diarra
CB	17	(Cameroon) Stéphane Mbia
RWB	24	(France) Rod Fanni
LWB	15	(France) Jérémy Morel	(yellow card) 8'
DM	21	(Senegal) Souleymane Diawara
RM	19	(France) Morgan Amalfitano		(substituted off) 66'
CM	8	(Argentina) Lucho González
LM	20	(Ghana) André Ayew
CF	11	(France) Loïc Rémy
Substitutes:
GK	1	(France) Gennaro Bracigliano
DF	2	(Spain) César Azpilicueta
DF	26	(France) Jean-Philippe Sabo
MF	6	(France) Édouard Cissé
MF	12	(Burkina Faso) Charles Kaboré		(substituted on) 66'
FW	9	(France) Chris Gadi
FW	23	(Ghana) Jordan Ayew		(substituted on) 66'
Manager:
Didier Deschamps

MATCH OFFICIALS

- Assistant referees:
  - Redouane Achik (Morocco)
  - Abdelaziz El Mehraji (Morocco)
- Fourth official: Abdellah Boulifa (Morocco)
- Principle Delegate: Arnaud Rouger

MATCH RULES

- 90 minutes.
- Penalty shoot-out if scores level after 90 minutes.
- Seven named substitutes
- Maximum of six substitutions.

== See also ==
- 2011–12 Ligue 1
- 2011–12 Coupe de France
- 2011–12 Lille OSC season
- 2011–12 Olympique de Marseille season
