= Lucas Digne =

French footballer (born 1993)

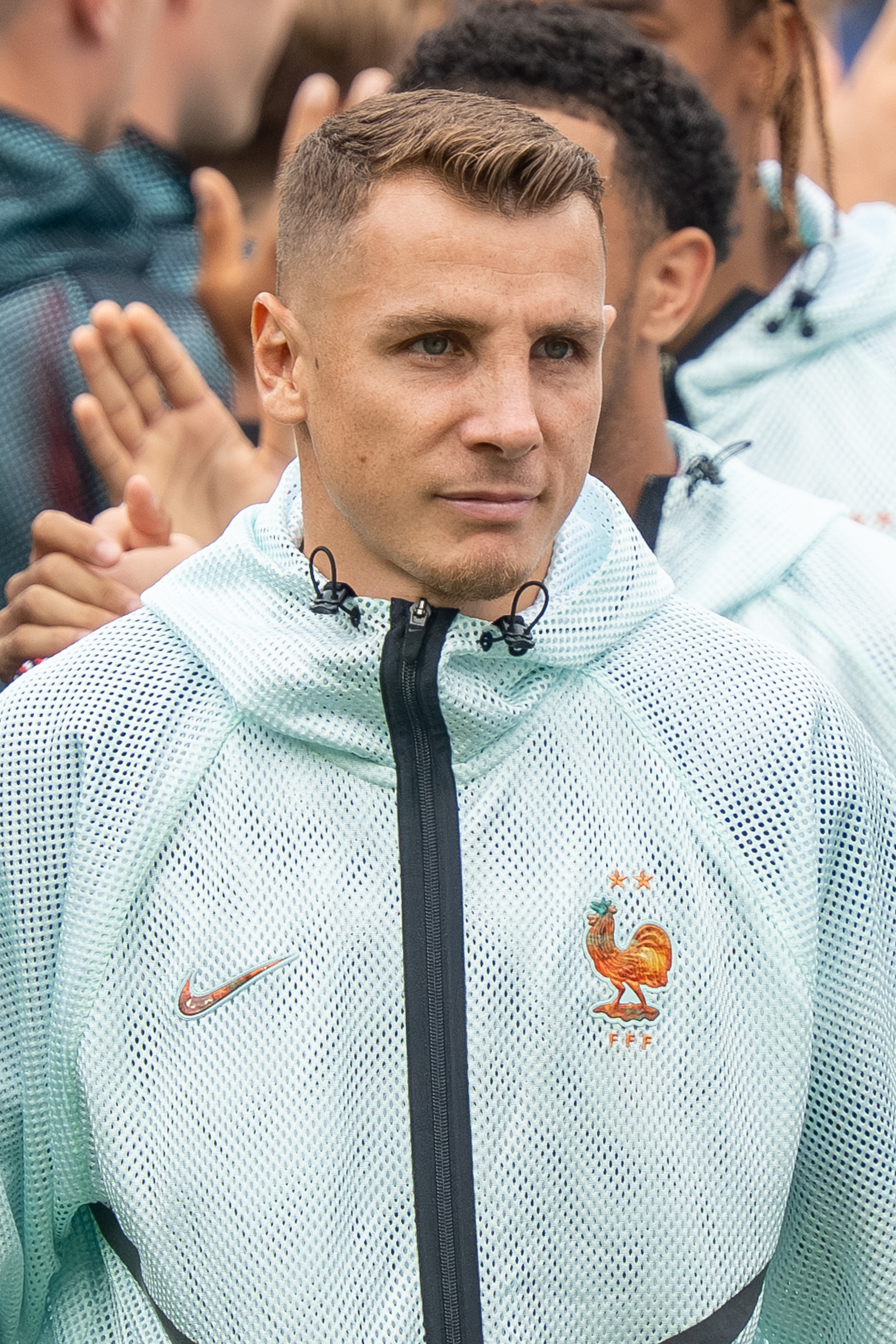
- Digne with France in 2026

Personal information
- Full name: Lucas Digne
- Date of birth: 20 July 1993 (age 33)
- Place of birth: Meaux, Seine-et-Marne, France
- Height: 1.78 m (5 ft 10 in)
- Position: Left-back

Team information
- Current team: Paris Saint-Germain
- Number: 12

Youth career
- 1999–2002: Mareuil-sur-Ourcq
- 2002–2005: Crépy-en-Valois
- 2005–2010: Lille

Senior career*
Years	Team	Apps	(Gls)
2010–2011	Lille B	35	(1)
2011–2013	Lille	49	(2)
2013–2016	Paris Saint-Germain	30	(0)
2015–2016	→ Roma (loan)	33	(3)
2016–2018	Barcelona	29	(0)
2018–2022	Everton	113	(4)
2022–2026	Aston Villa	140	(2)
2026–	Paris Saint-Germain	4	(0)

International career^{‡}
2008–2009	France U16	15	(0)
2009–2010	France U17	15	(0)
2010–2011	France U18	11	(0)
2011–2012	France U19	12	(1)
2013	France U20	12	(2)
2013	France U21	7	(0)
2014–	France	64	(0)
Medal record
Men's football
Representing France
UEFA Nations League
Winner	2021 Italy
Third place	2025 Germany
UEFA European Championship
Runner-up	2016 France
FIFA U-20 World Cup
Winner	2013 Turkey
- * Club domestic league appearances and goals as of 22:25, 30 October 2026 (UTC) ‡ National team caps and goals as of 12:42, 19 July 2026 (UTC)

Lucas Digne (French pronunciation: [lyka diɲ]; born 20 July 1993) is a French professional footballer who plays as a left-back for Ligue 1 club Paris Saint-Germain and the France national team.

Digne began his professional career at Lille before joining fellow French side Paris Saint-Germain in 2013. After spending a season on loan at Roma, he moved to Barcelona in July 2016. Despite not playing regularly at either club, he won twelve honours at Paris and Barcelona combined. He joined Everton in August 2018, making 113 appearances before transferring to Aston Villa in January 2022.

Digne won the 2013 World Cup with the France under-20 team, and made his senior international debut in March 2014. He represented France at the 2014 FIFA World Cup, UEFA Euro 2016 (where his nation reached the final), Euro 2020, and the 2026 World Cup.

== Club career ==
=== Lille ===
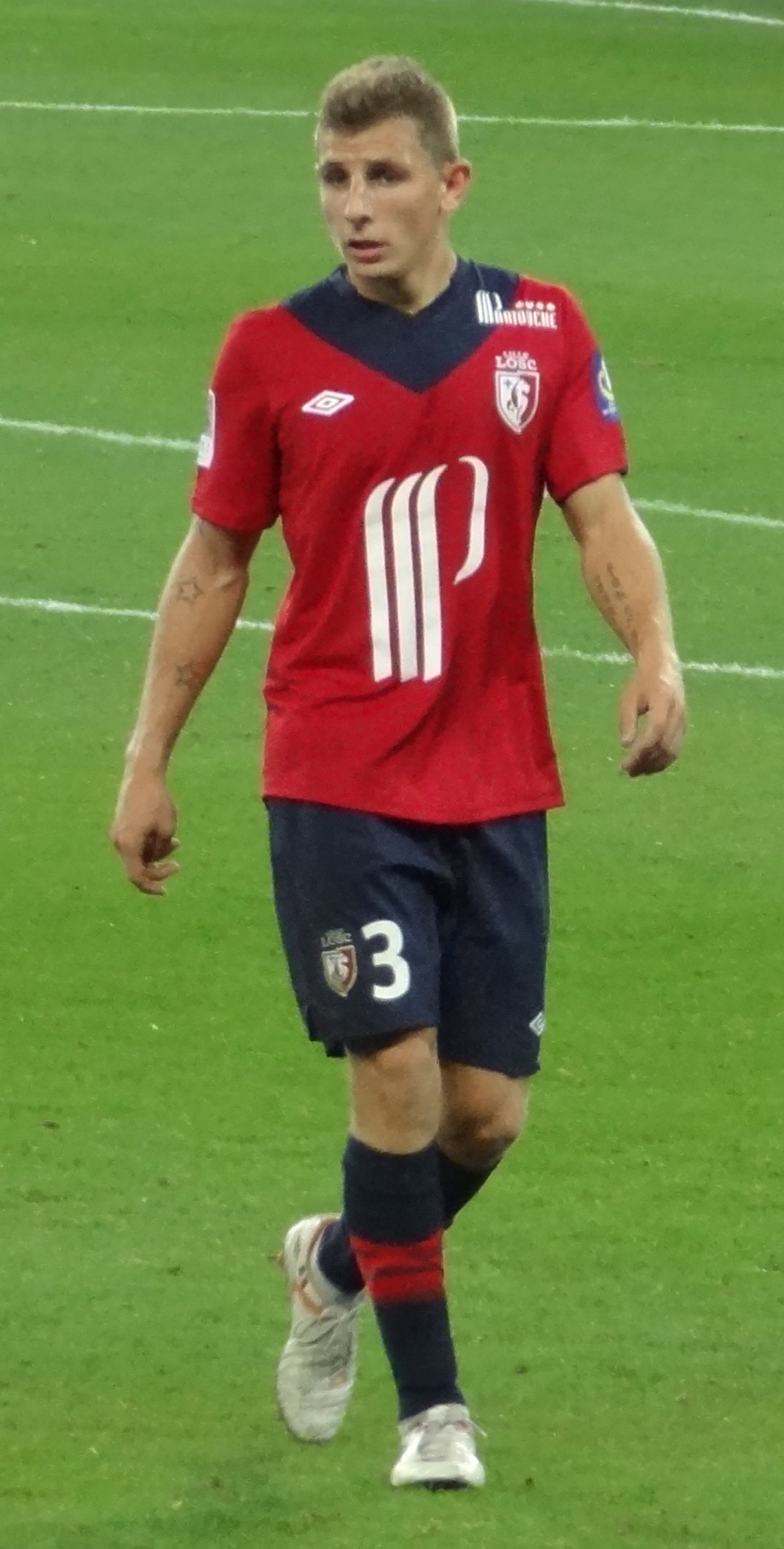
Digne playing for Lille in 2012

Born in Meaux, Seine-et-Marne, Digne finished his development at Lille, signing his first professional contract on 27 July 2010 for three years. Ahead of the 2011–12 season, Digne was promoted to the senior team permanently and assigned the number 3 shirt. He made his professional debut on 26 October 2011 in a 6–1 victory over Sedan in the last 16 of the Coupe de la Ligue.

In January 2012, Digne extended his contract until 2016. On 28 January, he made his Ligue 1 debut at the Stadium Nord Lille Metropole, playing the final two minutes of a 3–0 win over Saint-Étienne. He totalled 16 league appearances as the defending champions came third.

Digne was a regular in the 2012–13 season. On 23 February 2013, having given Lille the lead in a 3–1 win at Ajaccio when his cross was deflected in by Yoann Poulard, he was sent off after an hour for a foul on Matthieu Chalmé. He scored his first goal on 7 April, a penalty in a 5–0 home win over Lorient, and two weeks later he added another to equalise in a 2–1 comeback victory at Bastia.

=== Paris Saint-Germain ===
On 17 July 2013, Digne signed a five-year deal with Paris Saint-Germain, on a fee believed to be around €15 million. On 3 August, he was an unused substitute as they won the 2013 Trophée des Champions with a 2–1 victory over Bordeaux in Gabon. He did not make his debut until 13 September in a 2–0 win at the same opponents, as manager Laurent Blanc rotated his squad ahead of the UEFA Champions League. PSG ended the season with both the league and league cup titles, though Digne was back-up to Brazilian veteran Maxwell.

Digne played the full 90 minutes in the 2014 Trophée des Champions, which PSG won 2–0 against Guingamp in Beijing. The Parisians won all four domestic honours in 2014–15, with Digne an unused substitute in their Coupe de France and Coupe de la Ligue final victories.

==== Roma (loan) ====
On 26 August 2015, Italian Serie A club Roma signed Digne from PSG on a season-long loan deal for €2.5 million, with the option to make the move permanent at the end of the season. He made his debut five days later, playing the entire match in a 2–1 victory against title holders Juventus at the Stadio Olimpico. He blew a sarcastic kiss at opponent Roberto Pereyra and advised him to check the scoreboard, a gesture likened to one by Roma captain Francesco Totti to Igor Tudor of the same rival in a 4–0 win in February 2004.

Digne scored his first goal for the Giallorossi on 26 September with a close-range header in a 5–1 home win over Carpi, having earlier assisted Kostas Manolas in opening his account for the club. Against the same opponents on 12 February, he returned from injury to score from 30 metres in a 3–1 win, and on 17 April he opened a 3–3 draw at Atalanta. The team from Italy's capital came third in Serie A, and Digne declared that he wanted the move to be made permanent.

=== Barcelona ===
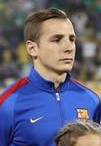
Digne lining up for Barcelona in 2016

Digne joined Spanish La Liga side Barcelona in time for the 2016–17 season on 13 July 2016, on a five-year deal. The fee was €16.5 million (£13.8 million), with the possibility to increase to €20.5 million (£17.1 million), according to individual and team results. On 14 August 2016, Digne made his first appearance for Barcelona in a 0–2 victory against Sevilla in the 2016 Supercopa de España first leg, as a 27th-minute substitute for compatriot Jérémy Mathieu.

He played 26 total games in his first season at the Camp Nou, scoring once in a 7–0 (8–1 aggregate) win over Segunda División B club Hércules in the round of 32 of the Copa del Rey on 21 December 2016. Barcelona won that cup, with Digne unused in the final on 27 May 2017, a 3–1 win over Alavés.

Digne played 20 times in 2017–18 as Barcelona won the league and cup double under new manager Ernesto Valverde. On 18 October 2017, he scored from Lionel Messi's assist in a 3–1 home win over Olympiacos in the Champions League group stage.

=== Everton ===
Digne joined English club Everton on 1 August 2018, for a five-year deal on an initial fee of £18 million. He made his debut ten days later, replacing double goalscorer and fellow debutant Richarlison for the last four minutes of a 2–2 draw at Wolverhampton Wanderers. On his first start on 29 August in a 3–1 EFL Cup win against Rotherham United, he assisted a goal from Dominic Calvert-Lewin. Digne made his first Premier League start for Everton four days later in a home game against Huddersfield Town, and assisted Calvert-Lewin's headed equaliser in a 1–1 draw.

By the start of October, Digne had become Everton's first-choice left back, ahead of veteran Leighton Baines. He scored his first goal for the club on 10 December, in the sixth minute of stoppage time at the end of a match against Watford, curling in a free kick for a 2–2 draw. Sixteen days later he scored twice in a 5–1 win at Burnley, with a free kick and a 30-yard shot. On 29 January 2019 he was sent off in a 1–0 win at Huddersfield for denying Adama Diakhaby a goalscoring opportunity with a foul. Digne's first season at Everton concluded with individual honours as he was named the Club's Player of the Season, as voted for by supporters, and Players' Player of the Season alongside midfielder Idrissa Gueye, the first time the award had been shared.

On 25 October 2020, Digne was sent off in a 2–0 loss at Southampton for a foul on Kyle Walker-Peters. Referee Kevin Friend recorded it as "serious foul play" which is punished with a three-game suspension, but the ban was reduced to one match on appeal.

In early January 2022, Digne told Everton manager Rafael Benítez that he no longer wanted to play for the club and wished to leave. He had argued with the manager over tactics. Benitez would be dismissed from the club just weeks later on 16 January.

=== Aston Villa ===
On 13 January 2022, Aston Villa announced the signing of 28-year-old Digne from Everton for a fee of £25 million, with a contract until 2026. He made his debut two days later, in a 2–2 home draw with Manchester United. On 23 August, Digne scored his first goal for the team in a 4–1 victory at Bolton Wanderers in the second round of the EFL Cup.

On 21 September 2022, Digne suffered a stress fracture to his ankle while on international duty with France, returning on 29 October as a second-half substitute in a 4–0 defeat to Newcastle United. On 6 November, Digne scored his first league goal for Aston Villa in a 3–1 home victory over Manchester United, in Unai Emery's first game as manager.

Digne assisted three goals on 23 August 2023 in a 5–0 win at Hibernian in a UEFA Europa Conference League qualifier. This came amidst doubts over his future due to Emery's preference for the more attacking Àlex Moreno as left back. A month later he scored in the group stage of the competition, albeit in a 3–2 loss at Legia Warsaw.

On 2 March 2024, Digne scored his second league goal for Aston Villa, a late winner scored in a 3–2 victory against Luton Town.

On 7 August 2025, Digne signed a contract extension with Aston Villa, lasting until 2028. It was reported that Digne had agreed to take a lower wage in order to avoid being sold by Aston Villa to aid with UEFA Financial Fair Play Regulations.

=== Return to Paris Saint-Germain ===
On 9 August 2026, Digne returned to Paris Saint-Germain, joining the club on a three-year contract until 2029.

== International career ==
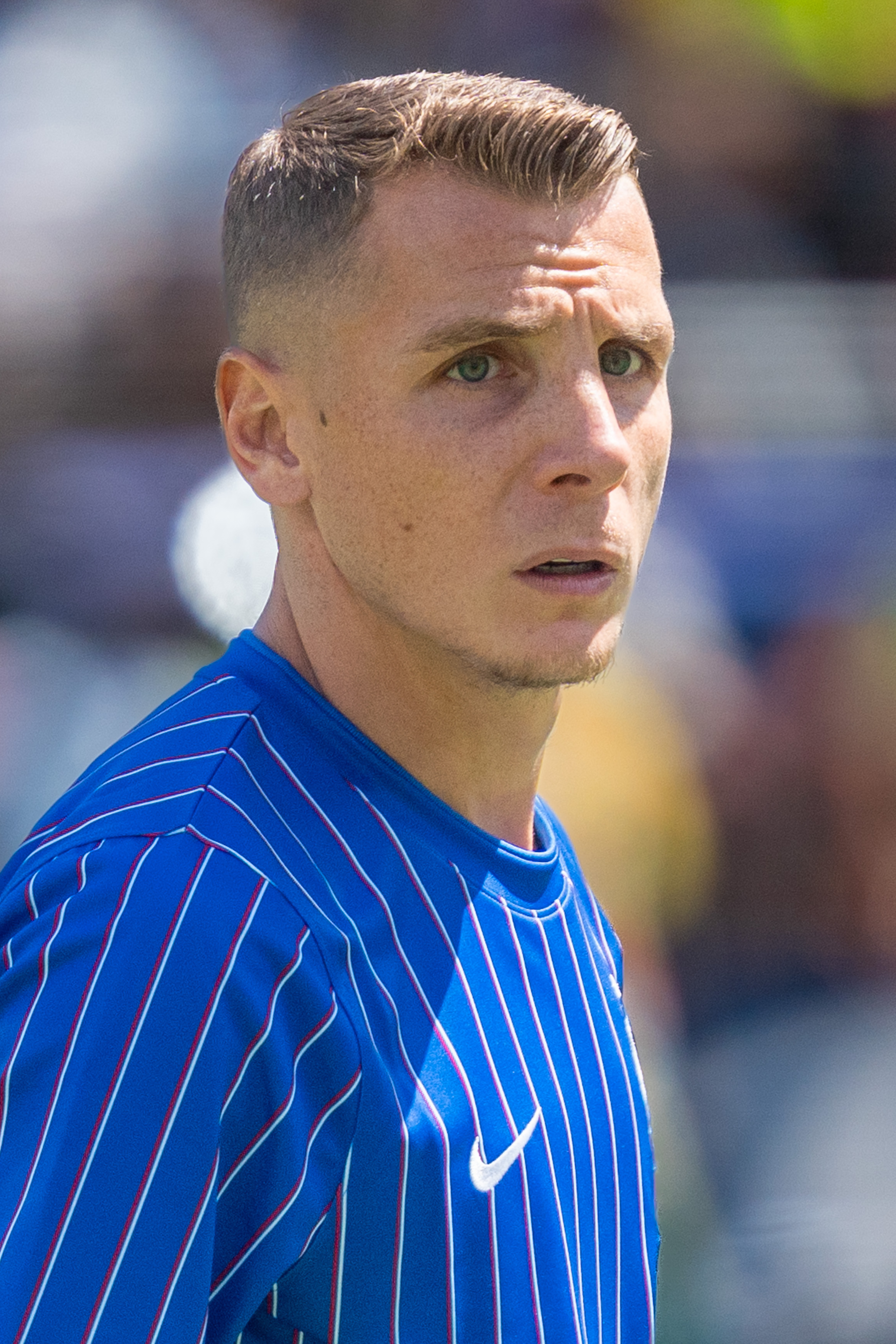
Digne with France at the 2026 FIFA World Cup

Digne was a French youth international and represented his nation at the U16, U17, and U18 levels. At the 2013 FIFA U-20 World Cup in Turkey, he played every match as France won the title.

The 20-year-old was first called up for the senior side in February 2014, ahead of a friendly match against the Netherlands on 5 March. He debuted in that match, as a half-time substitute for Patrice Evra in a 2–0 win at the Stade de France.

In June, manager Didier Deschamps named Digne as one of 23 members of the French squad for the 2014 FIFA World Cup in Brazil, wearing the number 17 shirt. His one appearance for the eventual quarter-finalists was the third group game against Ecuador, in which he suffered a foul that earned the Ecuadorian captain Antonio Valencia a straight red card.

Digne was chosen for the French squad that came runners-up on home soil at UEFA Euro 2016, but did not play. He was put on standby for the squad at the 2018 FIFA World Cup in Russia.

At UEFA Euro 2020, Digne came on at half time in the 2–2 group draw with Portugal due to Lucas Hernandez's injury. Minutes later, he too withdrew due to a thigh muscle injury. The injuries at left back forced Deschamps to use an untested 3–5–2 formation in the last 16 against Switzerland, which France lost.

Deschamps did not pick Digne for the 2022 FIFA World Cup, despite picking nine defenders for his squad. He said that he wanted to choose versatile defenders who could play central and wide positions.

On 14 May 2026, Digne was named in the French squad for the 2026 FIFA World Cup. In the semi-final against Spain, Digne conceded a penalty in the 22nd minute after a failed clearance resulted in a foul on Lamine Yamal, allowing Mikel Oyarzabal to open the scoring from the spot in a 2–0 defeat for France. On 18 July 2026, Digne finished the tournament playing in the second half against England national football team in the third-place match. England would win the game 6-4.

== Personal life ==
On 27 December 2014, Digne married his girlfriend Tiziri, whom he met while both were in school. The couple have a son and a daughter.

Digne was in Barcelona when it was hit by a terror attack on 17 August 2017, and gave first aid to the victims.

== Career statistics ==
=== Club ===
As of match played 30 October 2026

Appearances and goals by club, season and competition
Club	Season	League			National cup (Note: Includes Coupe de France, Coppa Italia, Copa del Rey, FA Cup)		League cup (Note: Includes Coupe de la Ligue, EFL Cup)		Europe		Other		Total	
Club	Season	Division	Apps	Goals	Apps	Goals	Apps	Goals	Apps	Goals	Apps	Goals	Apps	Goals
Lille	2011–12	Ligue 1	16	0	1	0	1	0	—		—		18	0
Lille	2012–13	Ligue 1	33	2	2	0	2	0	7 (Note: Appearance(s) in UEFA Champions League)	1	—		44	3
Lille	Total		49	2	3	0	3	0	7	1	—		62	3
Paris Saint-Germain	2013–14	Ligue 1	15	0	1	0	2	0	2	0	—		20	0
Paris Saint-Germain	2014–15	Ligue 1	15	0	5	0	2	0	1	0	1 (Note: Appearance in Trophée des Champions)	0	24	0
Paris Saint-Germain	Total		30	0	6	0	4	0	3	0	1	0	44	0
Roma (loan)	2015–16	Serie A	33	3	1	0	—		8	0	—		42	3
Barcelona	2016–17	La Liga	17	0	3	1	—		4	0	2 (Note: Appearance(s) in Supercopa de España)	0	26	1
Barcelona	2017–18	La Liga	12	0	4	0	—		3	1	1	0	20	1
Barcelona	Total		29	0	7	1	—		7	1	3	0	46	2
Everton	2018–19	Premier League	35	4	1	0	1	0	—		—		37	4
Everton	2019–20	Premier League	35	0	1	0	3	1	—		—		39	1
Everton	2020–21	Premier League	30	0	3	0	3	0	—		—		36	0
Everton	2021–22	Premier League	13	0	0	0	2	1	—		—		15	1
Everton	Total		113	4	5	0	9	2	—		—		127	6
Aston Villa	2021–22	Premier League	16	0	—		—		—		—		16	0
Aston Villa	2022–23	Premier League	28	1	1	0	2	1	—		—		31	2
Aston Villa	2023–24	Premier League	33	1	0	0	1	0	12 (Note: Appearances in UEFA Europa Conference League)	1	—		46	2
Aston Villa	2024–25	Premier League	32	0	4	0	0	0	9	0	—		45	0
Aston Villa	2025–26	Premier League	31	0	2	0	0	0	11 (Note: Appearances in UEFA Europa League)	0	—		44	0
Aston Villa	Total		140	2	7	0	3	1	32	1	—		182	4
Paris Saint-Germain	2026–27	Ligue 1	4	0	0	0	—		1	0	1	0	6	0
Career total			398	11	29	1	19	3	58	3	5	0	508	18

=== International ===
As of match played 18 July 2026

Appearances and goals by national team and year
National team	Year	Apps	Goals
France	2014	8	0
France	2015	2	0
France	2016	5	0
France	2017	5	0
France	2018	3	0
France	2019	7	0
France	2020	5	0
France	2021	8	0
France	2022	3	0
France	2023	0	0
France	2024	4	0
France	2025	5	0
France	2026	9	0
Total		64	0

== Honours ==
Paris Saint-Germain

- Ligue 1: 2013–14, 2014–15
- Coupe de France: 2014–15
- Coupe de la Ligue: 2013–14, 2014–15
- Trophée des Champions: 2013, 2014, 2015
- UEFA Super Cup: 2026

Barcelona

- La Liga: 2017–18
- Copa del Rey: 2016–17, 2017–18
- Supercopa de España: 2016

Aston Villa

- UEFA Europa League: 2025–26

France U20

- FIFA U-20 World Cup: 2013

France

- UEFA Nations League: 2020–21; third place 2024–25
- UEFA European Championship runner-up: 2016

Individual

- Everton Players' Player of the Season: 2018–19 (shared with Idrissa Gueye)
