= Steeve Elana =

French footballer (born 1980)

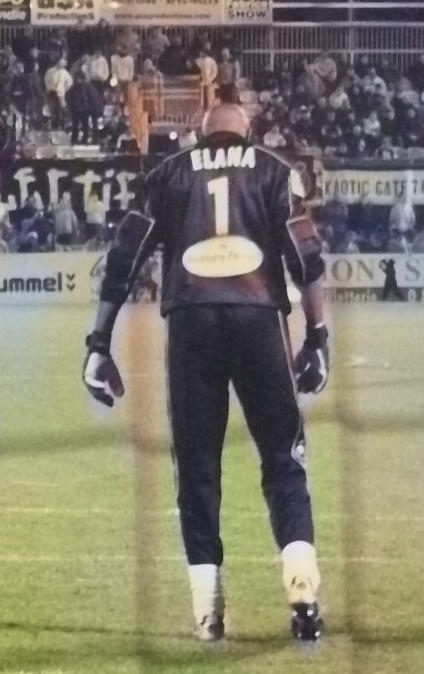
- Elana in 2004

Personal information
- Full name: Steeve Olivier Elana
- Date of birth: 11 July 1980 (age 46)
- Place of birth: Aubervilliers, Seine-Saint-Denis, France
- Height: 1.86 m (6 ft 1 in)
- Position: Goalkeeper

Team information
- Current team: Martigues
- Number: 1

Senior career*
| Years | Team | Apps | (Gls) |
| 1999–2001 | Marseille Endoume | 0 | (0) |
| 2001–2002 | ASOA Valence | 30 | (0) |
| 2002–2005 | Caen | 62 | (0) |
| 2005–2012 | Brest | 236 | (0) |
| 2012–2016 | Lille | 20 | (0) |
| 2016–2018 | Gazélec Ajaccio | 74 | (0) |
| 2018–2019 | Tours | 32 | (0) |
| 2019–2020 | Cholet | 25 | (0) |
| 2020 | Martigues | 8 | (0) |
| Total | | 487 | (0) |

International career
| 2014 | Martinique | 7 | (0) |
- * Club domestic league appearances and goals

Steeve Olivier Elana (born 11 July 1980) is a French former professional footballer who plays as a goalkeeper for FC Martigues. Born in metropolitan France, he represented the Martinique national team.

== Club career ==
Elana previously played for Lille OSC in the French Ligue 1. He became first choice goalkeeper for Lille after the departure of Mickaël Landreau. However, he was displaced in 2013–14 by the Nigerian international Vincent Enyeama.

== International career ==
Born in France, Elana is of Martiniquais and Guinean descent. In March 2019, 38-year-old Elana was called up to the Guinea national team, having previously played internationally for Martinique which is a non-FIFA member. He was unable to get a Guinean passport, as he was not able to confirm the Guinean village his grandparents came from.

== Career statistics ==
=== Club ===
Appearances and goals by club, season and competition
| Club | Season | League | | | Cup | | League cup | | Europe | | Other | | Total | |
| Club | Season | Division | Apps | Goals | Apps | Goals | Apps | Goals | Apps | Goals | Apps | Goals | Apps | Goals |
|---|---|---|---|---|---|---|---|---|---|---|---|---|---|---|
| ASOA Valence | 2001–02 | National | 30 | 0 | 0 | 0 | 1 | 0 | — | | — | | 31 | 0 |
| Caen | 2002–03 | Ligue 2 | 12 | 0 | 1 | 0 | 0 | 0 | — | | — | | 13 | 0 |
| Caen | 2003–04 | Ligue 2 | 37 | 0 | 4 | 0 | 0 | 0 | — | | — | | 41 | 0 |
| Caen | 2004–05 | Ligue 1 | 13 | 0 | 2 | 0 | 0 | 0 | — | | — | | 15 | 0 |
| Caen | Total | | 62 | 0 | 7 | 0 | 0 | 0 | — | | — | | 69 | 10 |
| Brest | 2005–06 | Ligue 2 | 33 | 0 | 2 | 0 | 0 | 0 | — | | — | | 35 | 0 |
| Brest | 2006–07 | Ligue 2 | 36 | 0 | 0 | 0 | 0 | 0 | — | | — | | 36 | 0 |
| Brest | 2007–08 | Ligue 2 | 35 | 0 | 1 | 0 | 0 | 0 | — | | — | | 36 | 0 |
| Brest | 2008–09 | Ligue 2 | 19 | 0 | 0 | 0 | 1 | 0 | — | | — | | 20 | 0 |
| Brest | 2009–10 | Ligue 2 | 38 | 0 | 2 | 0 | 1 | 0 | — | | — | | 41 | 0 |
| Brest | 2010–11 | Ligue 1 | 38 | 0 | 2 | 0 | 1 | 0 | — | | — | | 41 | 0 |
| Brest | 2011–12 | Ligue 1 | 37 | 0 | 0 | 0 | 0 | 0 | — | | — | | 37 | 0 |
| Brest | Total | | 236 | 0 | 7 | 0 | 3 | 0 | — | | — | | 246 | 0 |
| Lille | 2012–13 | Ligue 1 | 20 | 0 | 3 | 0 | 3 | 0 | 2 | 0 | — | | 28 | 0 |
| Lille | 2013–14 | Ligue 1 | 0 | 0 | 4 | 0 | 1 | 0 | — | | — | | 5 | 0 |
| Lille | 2014–15 | Ligue 1 | 0 | 0 | 1 | 0 | 0 | 0 | 1 | 0 | — | | 2 | 0 |
| Lille | 2015–16 | Ligue 1 | 0 | 0 | 2 | 0 | 0 | 0 | — | | — | | 2 | 0 |
| Lille | Total | | 20 | 0 | 10 | 0 | 4 | 0 | 3 | 0 | — | | 37 | 0 |
| Gazélec Ajaccio | 2016–17 | Ligue 2 | 38 | 0 | 0 | 0 | 0 | 0 | — | | — | | 38 | 0 |
| Gazélec Ajaccio | 2017–18 | Ligue 2 | 36 | 0 | 0 | 0 | 0 | 0 | — | | — | | 36 | 0 |
| Gazélec Ajaccio | Total | | 74 | 0 | 0 | 0 | 0 | 0 | — | | — | | 74 | 0 |
| Tours | 2018–19 | National | 32 | 0 | 2 | 0 | 1 | 0 | — | | — | | 35 | 0 |
| Cholet | 2019–20 | National | 25 | 0 | 1 | 0 | — | | — | | — | | 26 | 0 |
| Martigues | 2020–21 | National 2 | 8 | 0 | — | | — | | — | | — | | 8 | 0 |
| Career total | | | 487 | 0 | 27 | 0 | 9 | 0 | 3 | 0 | 0 | 0 | 526 | 0 |
