= Barel Mouko =

Congolese footballer (born 1979)

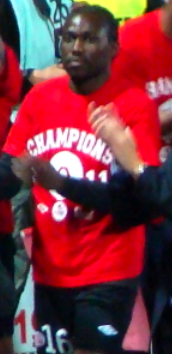
- Mouko with Lille in 2011

Personal information
- Full name: Barel Morial Mouko
- Date of birth: 5 April 1979 (age 47)
- Place of birth: Pointe-Noire, Republic of the Congo
- Height: 1.78 m (5 ft 10 in)
- Position: Goalkeeper

Team information
- Current team: Rostrenen FC

Youth career
- 1992–1994: Manchester Congo Mouilla
- 1994–1995: La Mancha Brazzaville
- 1996–1997: Stade Mbombey Mouilla
- 1998: Pigeon Vert Pointe-Noire

Senior career*
Years	Team	Apps	(Gls)
1999–2000	La Mancha Pointe Noire		
2001	AS Stade Mandji		
2001–2002	Massy 91		
2002–2003	Issy-les-Moulineaux		
2003–2008	Dijon	158	(0)
2009	Gueugnon	20	(0)
2009–2015	Lille	3	(0)
2010–2015	Lille B	43	(1)
2015–2016	AC Léopard		
2017	CS La Mancha		
2018–2022	DCMP		
2022–	Rostrenen FC		

International career
2000–2018	Congo	38	(1)
- * Club domestic league appearances and goals as of 08:09, 27 September 2024 (UTC)

Barel Morial Mouko (born 5 April 1979) is a Congolese professional footballer who plays as a goalkeeper for Rostrenen FC.

== Club career ==
Mouko was born in Pointe-Noire. He started his career at his home nation Congo, having a brief spell at Gabonese AS Stade Mandji, before playing amateur football in France. In 2003, he joined Dijon FCO and became the starter goalkeeper, achieving promotion from the Championnat National in his first season. He left the club in 2008, signing for FC Gueugnon in 2009.

In the next season, Mouko was signed by his former Dijon manager, Rudi Garcia, to play for Lille OSC. At Lille, Mouko was a reserve to regular goalkeeper Steeve Elana. He made a few Ligue 1 appearances after Elana suffered a drop in form during 2013, but spent most of the playing time with the B team. He scored once in the 2013–14 Championnat de France amateur.

== International career ==
Mouko was a regular for the Congo national team, appearing in 2014 FIFA World Cup qualifying.

In 2010, during the 2012 Africa Cup of Nations qualification, he scored the first goal of a 3–1 win against Swaziland from the penalty spot.

== International goals ==
Scores and results list Congo's goal tally first, score column indicates score after Mouko goal.

International goal scored by Barel Mouko
No.	Date	Venue	Opponent	Score	Result	Competition
1	10 October 2010	Brazzaville	Swaziland	3–1	Win	2012 Africa Cup of Nations qualification

== Honours ==
Lille

- Coupe de France: 2010–11
