= Aurélien Montaroup =

French footballer (born 1985)

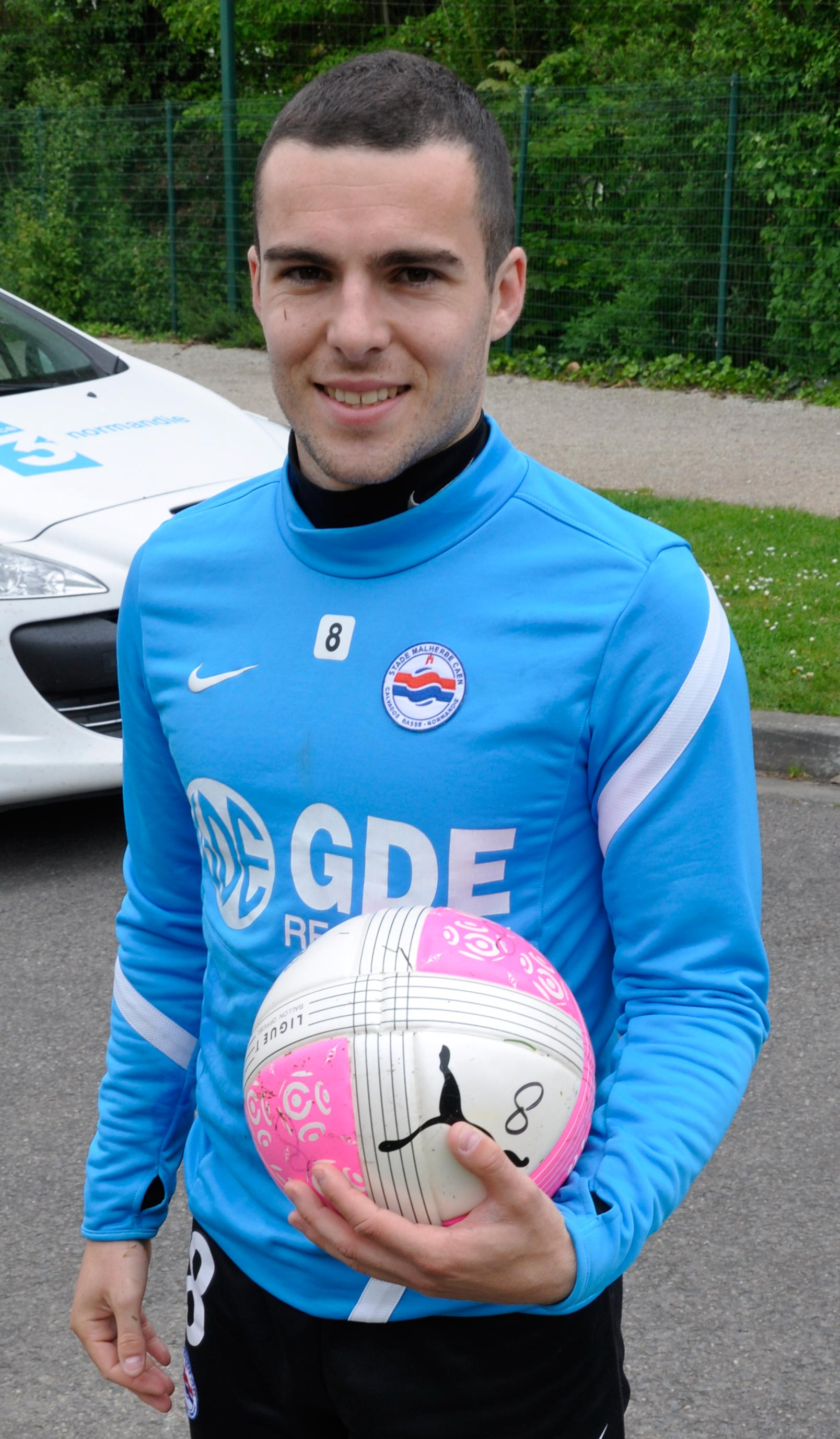

Personal information
- Date of birth: 19 December 1985 (age 40)
- Place of birth: Rennes, France
- Height: 1.73 m (5 ft 8 in)
- Position: Defender

Youth career
- 2000–2003: Rennes

Senior career*
Years	Team	Apps	(Gls)
2003–2005	Rennes B	49	(9)
2005	Dijon	6	(0)
2006	Orléans	14	(1)
2006	Créteil	0	(0)
2007–2008	La Vitréenne	21	(1)
2009–2011	Dinamo Minsk	74	(3)
2012–2014	Caen	65	(6)
2014–2016	US Créteil	42	(1)
2016–2017	Rennes B	7	(0)
- * Club domestic league appearances and goals as of 31 May 2018

Aurélien Montaroup (born 19 December 1985) is a French former football defender.

== Career ==
Montaroup began his career by Stade Rennais F.C. but never turned professional there. Then he played by Dijon FCO, US Orléans, US Créteil-Lusitanos and La Vitréenne FC.

On 7 January 2009, Montaroup signed a contract with Belarus top club FC Dinamo Minsk.

== Honours ==
- Coupe Gambardella: 2003
