= Rod Fanni =

French footballer (born 1981)

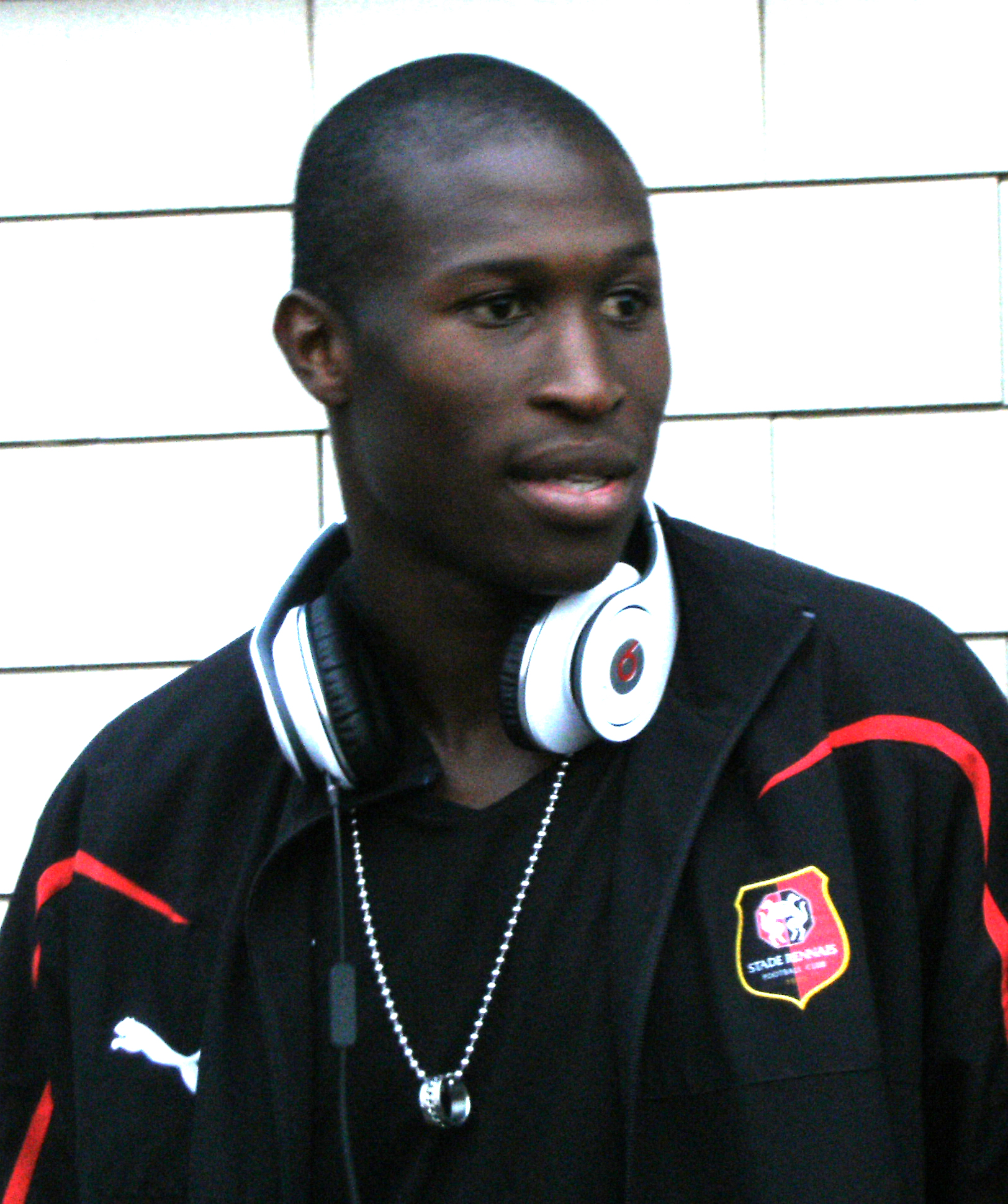
- Fanni in 2010

Personal information
- Full name: Rod Dodji Fanni
- Date of birth: 6 December 1981 (age 44)
- Place of birth: Martigues, Bouches-du-Rhône, France
- Height: 1.86 m (6 ft 1 in)
- Position: Centre-back

Youth career
- 1999–2000: Martigues

Senior career*
Years	Team	Apps	(Gls)
2000–2002	Martigues	63	(1)
2002–2005	Lens	39	(0)
2004–2005	→ Châteauroux (loan)	34	(1)
2005–2007	Nice	57	(0)
2007–2011	Rennes	114	(2)
2011–2015	Marseille	127	(5)
2015–2016	Al-Arabi SC	15	(1)
2016	→ Charlton Athletic (loan)	14	(0)
2016–2018	Marseille	43	(1)
2018–2020	Montreal Impact	43	(1)

International career
2008–2010	France	5	(0)
- * Club domestic league appearances and goals

Rod Dodji Fanni (born 6 December 1981) is a French former professional footballer who played as a centre-back. He made five appearances for the France national team between 2008 and 2010.

== Club career ==
=== Early career ===
Fanni began his career with Martigues, playing in both Ligue 2 and the Championnat National. He joined Lens in 2002 where he made his debut in Ligue 1, as well as both the UEFA Champions League and the UEFA Cup. He played the entire 2004–05 season on loan at Châteauroux in Ligue 2.

=== Nice ===
In June 2005, he joined Nice but left after only two seasons to sign a four-year contract with Rennes, where he was viewed as a replacement for Dutch defender Mario Melchiot, who had departed for Premier League club Wigan Athletic. Fanni was named in the Ligue 1 Team of the Year for the 2008–09 season. He expressed desire to play in the Premier League and was strongly linked with a move to Newcastle United before signing for Rennes. He was also linked with Everton and West Ham United prior to signing a one-year contract extension with Rennes in November 2009, which kept Fanni tied to Les Rouges et Noirs until June 2012.

=== Marseille ===
In December 2010, Marseille successfully acquired the services of Fanni.

=== Al-Arabi SC and Charlton Athletic ===
In 2015 Fanni left Marseille after his contract ended. On 11 July 2015, Qatari side Al-Arabi SC signed Fanni on a free transfer.

On 1 February 2016, Fanni signed for Charlton Athletic on loan until the end of season.

=== Return to Marseille ===
On 31 August 2016, Fanni returned to Marseille. In February 2018, Marseille announced it had agreed to terminate Fanni's contract at the end of January. Fanni had not made an appearance in the first half of the 2017–18 season.

=== Montreal Impact ===
In early March 2018, Montreal Impact announced the signing of Fanni on a contract until June with the option of a further season, pending international transfer certification and a medical.

== International career ==
Fanni made his debut for the France national team against Tunisia on 14 October 2008 in a 3–1 victory. Despite stiff competition from players such as Bacary Sagna and François Clerc, Fanni was named regularly in Raymond Domenech's squad as second choice right-back behind Sagna.

== Personal life ==
Fanni's family originates from Benin. He began his football career whilst pursuing his studies, earning a BEP (French secondary school diploma) and then going on to study for a bachelor's degree in Industrial Science and Technology.

== Honours ==
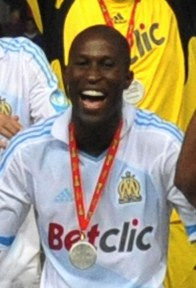
Fanni winning 2011 Trophée des Champions with Marseille

Marseille

- Coupe de la Ligue: 2010–11, 2011–12
- Trophée des Champions: 2011

Individual

- UNFP Team of the Year: 2008–09, 2009–10
