= Aurélien Chedjou =

Cameroonian footballer (born 1985)

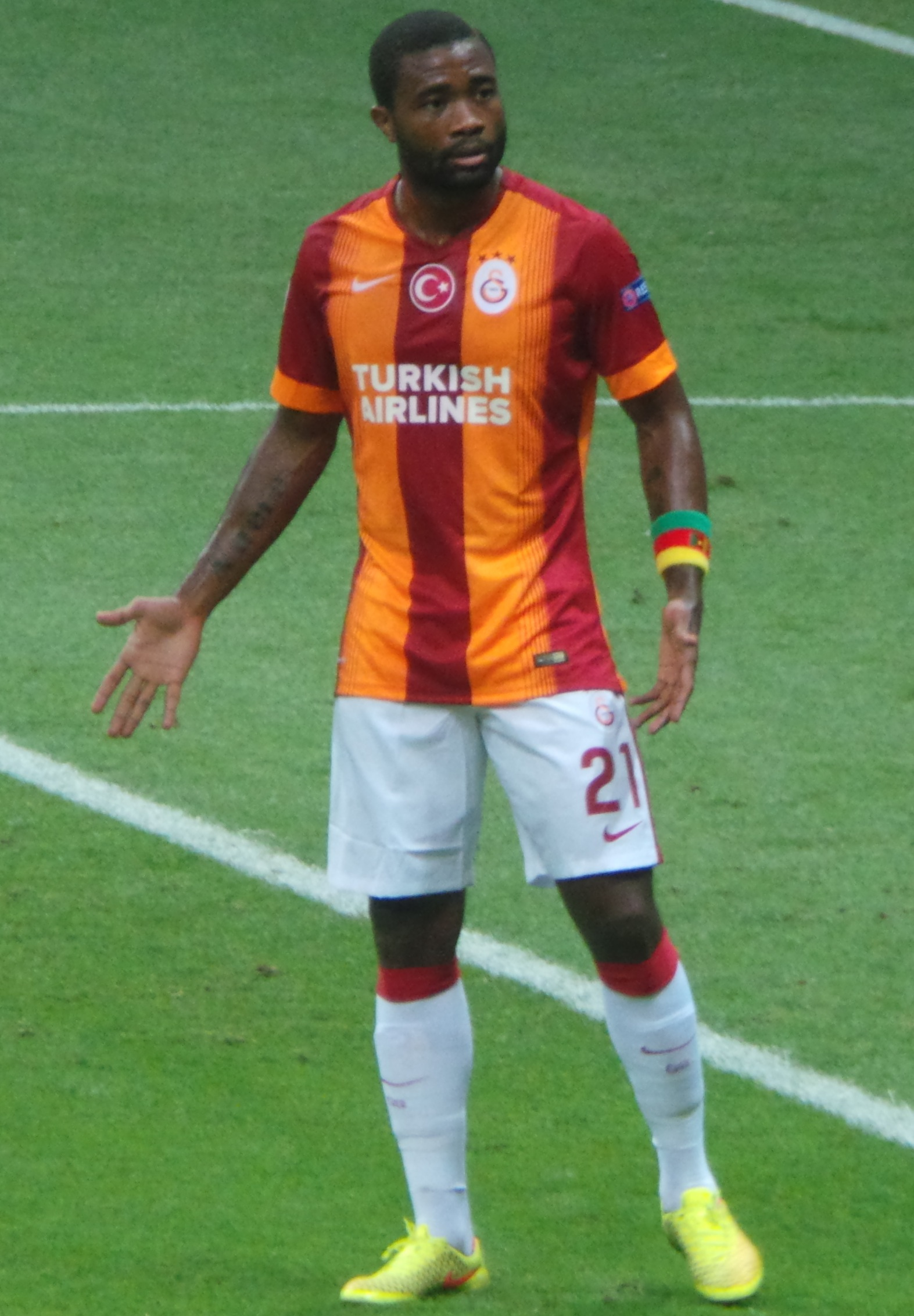
- Chedjou playing for Galatasaray in 2014

Personal information
- Full name: Aurélien Bayard Chedjou Fongang
- Date of birth: 20 June 1985 (age 41)
- Place of birth: Douala, Cameroon
- Height: 1.84 m (6 ft 0 in)
- Position: Centre back

Youth career
- 1998–2002: Kadji Sports Academy
- 2002–2003: Villarreal

Senior career*
Years	Team	Apps	(Gls)
2003–2004	Pau FC	2	(0)
2004–2006	Auxerre	4	(0)
2006–2007	Rouen	10	(1)
2007–2013	Lille	154	(10)
2013–2017	Galatasaray	81	(8)
2017–2019	İstanbul Başakşehir	3	(0)
2018–2019	→ Bursaspor (loan)	26	(1)
2019–2020	Amiens	23	(0)
2020–2021	Adana Demirspor	5	(1)

International career
2009–2016	Cameroon	49	(1)
- * Club domestic league appearances and goals

Aurélien Bayard Chedjou Fongang (French pronunciation: [ɔʁeljɛ̃ ʃɛdʒu]; born 20 June 1985) is a Cameroonian former professional footballer who played as a centre back for Lille, Galatasaray, Bursaspor, Adana Demirspor and the Cameroon national team.

== Club career ==
Chedjou signed for Lille at the start of the 2007–08 season, and over five years made over 150 league appearances for the club, helping them to a third Ligue 1 title and Coupe de France success in 2011. He scored his first UEFA Europa League goal on 21 October 2010 against Levski Sofia after a Stéphane Dumont assist to help his team to a 1–0 win.

Chedjou's performances with Lille have led to him being scouted by several prominent European clubs, with both Newcastle United and Valencia declaring their interest in the player.

On 25 May 2013, Chedjou passed his medical and signed for four years with Galatasaray.

In 2013–14, Chedjou played every minute of Galatasaray's UEFA Champions League campaign, scoring in the round of 16 home leg against Chelsea.

Chedjou made 119 appearances during a four-year stint with Galatasaray that saw him win the league title in 2015 and three straight Turkish FA Cup titles in 2014, 2015 and 2016 as well as three Turkish Super Cups in 2013, 2015 and 2016.

In the summer of 2017 Chedjou joined Istanbul Basaksehir on a free transfer. However, he broke his ankle in the pre-season preparatory camp and had to wait for his debut.

On 2 September 2019, he signed two-year contract with Amiens SC.

== International career ==
Represented the national team at 2010 Africa Cup of Nations when his team advanced to the quarterfinals. as well as the 2014 World Cup in Brasil.

== Career statistics ==
=== Club ===
As of 30 December 2020

Appearances and goals by club, season and competition
Club	Season	League			National cup (Note: Includes Coupe de France, Turkish Cup)		League cup (Note: Includes Coupe de la Ligue)		Europe		Other		Total	
Club	Season	Division	Apps	Goals	Apps	Goals	Apps	Goals	Apps	Goals	Apps	Goals	Apps	Goals
Lille	2007–08	Ligue 1	2	0	0	0	0	0	–		–		2	0
Lille	2008–09	Ligue 1	26	0	3	0	1	0	–		–		30	0
Lille	2009–10	Ligue 1	31	2	0	0	0	0	11 (Note: Appearances in UEFA Europa League)	1	–		42	3
Lille	2010–11	Ligue 1	34	1	6	1	1	0	8	2	–		49	4
Lille	2011–12	Ligue 1	27	4	3	0	1	0	4 (Note: Appearances in UEFA Champions League)	0	1 (Note: Appearance in Trophée des Champions)	0	36	4
Lille	2012–13	Ligue 1	34	3	3	0	2	0	7	1	–		46	4
Lille	Total		154	10	15	1	5	0	30	4	1	0	205	15
Galatasaray	2013–14	Süper Lig	21	3	4	0	–		8	1	0	0	33	4
Galatasaray	2014–15	Süper Lig	26	4	3	0	–		5	0	1 (Note: Appearance in Turkish Super Cup)	0	35	4
Galatasaray	2015–16	Süper Lig	18	1	4	2	–		6	0	1	0	29	3
Galatasaray	2016–17	Süper Lig	15	0	4	1	–		–		1	0	20	1
Galatasaray	Total		80	8	15	3	–		19	1	3	0	118	12
Başakşehir	2017–18	Süper Lig	1	0	0	0	–		–		–		1	0
Başakşehir	2019–20	Süper Lig	2	0	0	0	–		1	0	–		3	0
Başakşehir	Total		3	0	0	0	–		1	0	–		4	0
Bursaspor (loan)	2018–19	Süper Lig	26	1	–		–		–		–		26	1
Amiens	2019–20	Ligue 1	22	0	1	0	2	0	–		–		25	0
Amiens	2020–21	Ligue 2	1	0	–		–		–		–		1	0
Amiens	Total		23	0	1	0	2	0	–		–		26	0
Adana Demirspor	2020–21	TFF First League	5	1	1	0	–		–		–		6	1
Career total			283	19	29	4	7	0	50	5	4	0	374	29

=== International ===
No.	Date	Venue	Opponent	Score	Result	Competition	Ref.
1.	8 September 2013	Stade Ahmadou Ahidjo, Yaoundé	Libya	1-0	1-0	2014 FIFA World Cup qualification	

== Honours ==
Lille

- Ligue 1: 2010–11
- Coupe de France: 2010–11

Galatasaray

- Süper Lig: 2014–15
- Turkish Cup: 2013–14, 2014–15, 2015–16
- Turkish Super Cup: 2013, 2015, 2016
