= Mauro Cetto =

Argentine footballer

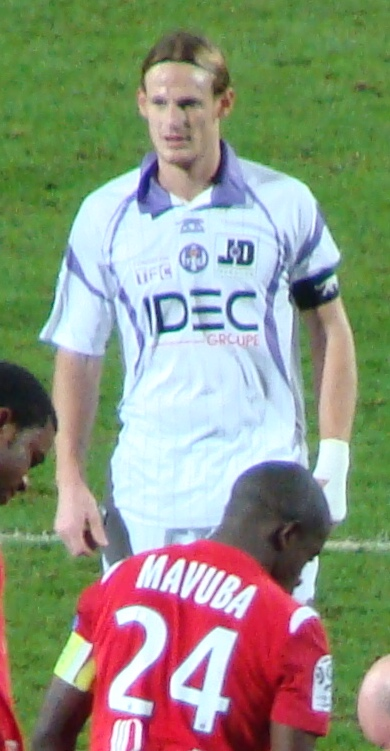
- Cetto with Toulouse in 2011

Personal information
- Full name: Mauro Darío Jesús Cetto
- Date of birth: April 14, 1982 (age 44)
- Place of birth: Rosario, Argentina
- Height: 1.82 m (6 ft 0 in)
- Position: Centre back

Senior career*
Years	Team	Apps	(Gls)
2000–2002	Rosario Central	15	(0)
2002–2008	Nantes	110	(3)
2007–2008	→ Toulouse (loan)	24	(0)
2008–2011	Toulouse	75	(7)
2011–2013	Palermo	10	(0)
2012	→ Lille (loan)	7	(0)
2013–2015	San Lorenzo	43	(5)
2016–2017	Rosario Central	4	(1)

International career
2000–2002	Argentina U20	21	(0)

Managerial career
- 2017–2019: Rosario Central (sporting director)
- * Club domestic league appearances and goals

Mauro Darío Jesús Cetto (born April 14, 1982, in Rosario) is an Argentine retired footballer who played as a defender. He lastly worked as the sporting director of Rosario Central.

== Career ==
Cetto won the 2001 FIFA World Youth Championship with the Argentina Under-20 team. He moved to France in 2002, spending five seasons with FC Nantes before to become a mainstay at Toulouse FC, where he played from 2007 to 2011.

In June 2011 he accepted to join Serie A club Palermo on a free transfer. His Italian experience turned out to be unfortunate in his first season, as Matías Silvestre and Giulio Migliaccio (a central midfielder adapted as a centre back) were preferred to him as starting centre backs. On January 26, 2012, he was sent on loan to Lille until the end of the season, with an option for the team from Northern France to sign him permanently.

Cetto returned to Palermo after Lille opted not to acquire the player permanently, and was called up for the summer pre-season camp where he met new head coach Giuseppe Sannino, who then decided to keep him in the rosanero team for the 2012–13 season. As a result, he played the full 90 minutes (pairing with youngster Milan Milanović) in the first competitive game of the season, a 3–1 win against Cremonese.

On Thursday, January 24, 2013, San Lorenzo de Almagro from Argentina, a Primera A team, signed Mauro Cetto for 2 1/2 years.

== Personal life ==
Mauro Cetto holds both Argentine and Italian nationality.

== Honours ==
San Lorenzo

- Argentine Primera División: 2013 Inicial
- Copa Libertadores: 2014

Argentina U20

- FIFA U-20 World Cup: 2001
