= Laurent Bonnart =

French footballer (born 1979)

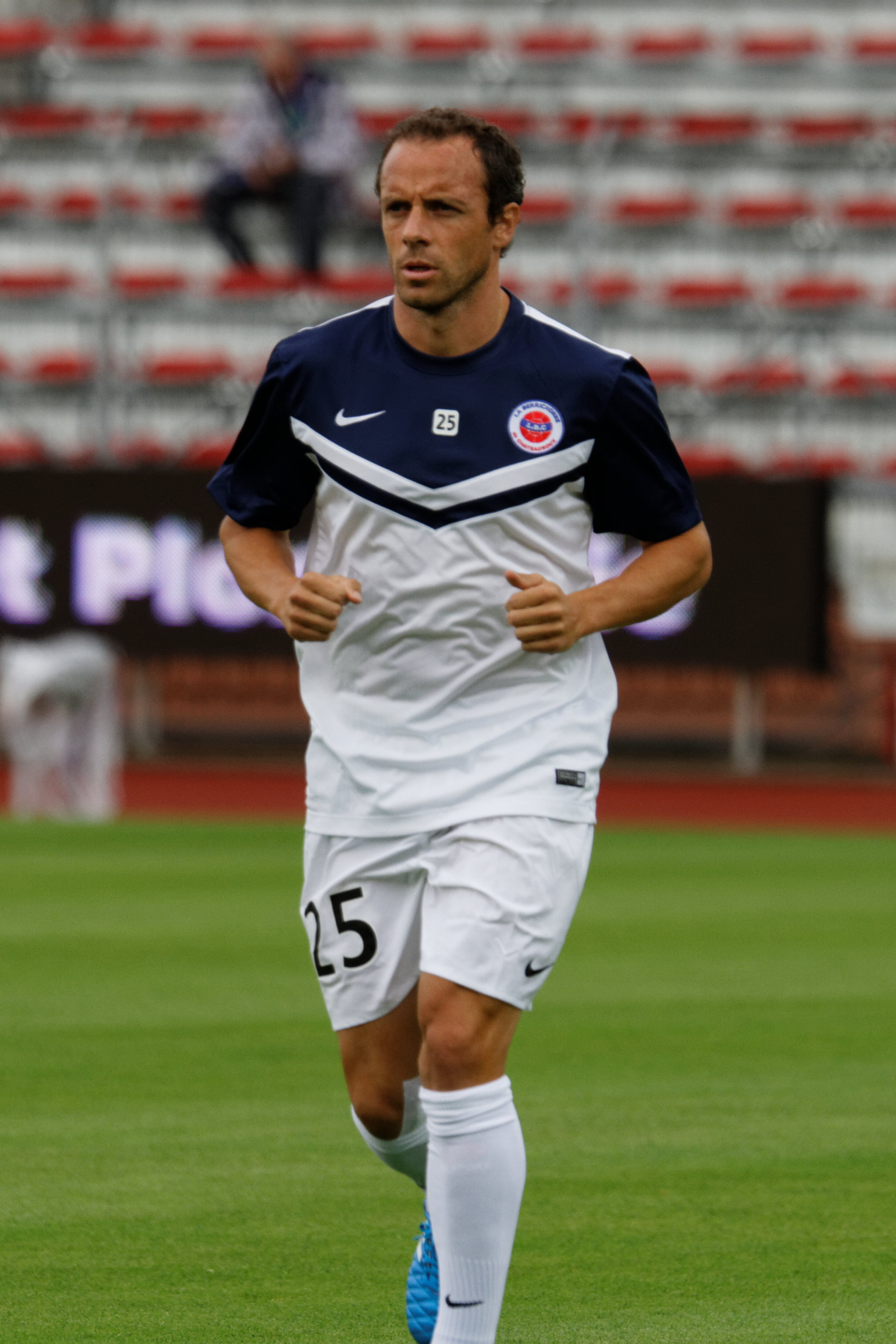
- Bonnart with Châteauroux in 2014

Personal information
- Full name: Laurent Noël Bonnart
- Date of birth: 25 December 1979 (age 46)
- Place of birth: Chambray-lès-Tours, Indre-et-Loire, France
- Height: 1.71 m (5 ft 7 in)
- Position: Full-back

Senior career*
| Years | Team | Apps | (Gls) |
| 1997–1998 | Tours | 16 | (2) |
| 1998–2007 | Le Mans | 235 | (4) |
| 2007–2010 | Marseille | 97 | (0) |
| 2010–2011 | Monaco | 25 | (0) |
| 2011–2013 | Lille | 16 | (0) |
| 2013–2014 | Ajaccio | 23 | (0) |
| 2014–2015 | Châteauroux | 29 | (0) |
| Total | | 441 | (6) |
- * Club domestic league appearances and goals

Laurent Noël Bonnart (born 25 December 1979) is a French former professional footballer who played as a full-back.

== Career ==
Born in Chambray-lès-Tours, Indre-et-Loire, Bonnart began his career with Le Mans UC72, he became a regular in the team from the start of the 2001–02 season, having made his debut in Ligue 2 in the season's first match.

In 2007, he moved from Le Mans to Marseille.

In 2010, he moved to Monaco on a free transfer.

== Honours ==
Marseille

- Ligue 1: 2009–10
- Coupe de la Ligue: 2009–10
