= Omar Wade =

Senegalese footballer

Personal information
- Date of birth: 15 May 1990 (age 36)
- Place of birth: Dakar, Senegal
- Height: 1.80 m (5 ft 11 in)
- Position: Forward

Senior career*
Years	Team	Apps	(Gls)
2008–2009	Diambars		
2009–2012	Lille B	16	(7)
2010–2013	Lille	1	(0)
2012	→ Boluspor (loan)	8	(0)
2012–2013	→ Mouscron (loan)	5	(0)
2013	→ Carquefou (loan)	9	(1)
2013–2015	Diambars		
2015	Feignies		
2015–2016	Drancy	16	(5)
2016–2018	Al-Arabi		
2019	Ain Sud Foot		
2019–2020	Gueugnon	11	(15)
2020–2022	Annecy	32	(6)
2022	Al-Shoulla		
- * Club domestic league appearances and goals as of 20:32, 5 February 2021 (UTC)

Omar Wade (born 15 May 1990) is a Senegalese professional footballer who plays as a forward.

== Career ==
Born in Dakar, Wade trained with the academy of Diambars before signing professional with French club Lille. He made his senior debut for Lille during the 2010–11 season, and moved on loan to Turkish club Boluspor in January 2012. He had further loan spells at Mouscron-Péruwelz and Carquefou during the 2012–13 season. At the end of his Lille contract, he returned to Diambars, where he stayed for two seasons, before signing for SC Feignies in January 2015. He spent the 2015–16 season with JA Drancy, followed by two years in the United Arab Emirates with Al-Arabi.

In January 2019 he signed for Ain Sud Foot. In August 2019 he signed for Gueugnon in Championnat National 3, where he scored 15 goals in 11 appearances before leaving for Annecy in February 2020.

On 7 February 2022, Wade joined Saudi Arabian club Al-Shoulla.
