= Marko Baša =

Montenegrin footballer (born 1982)

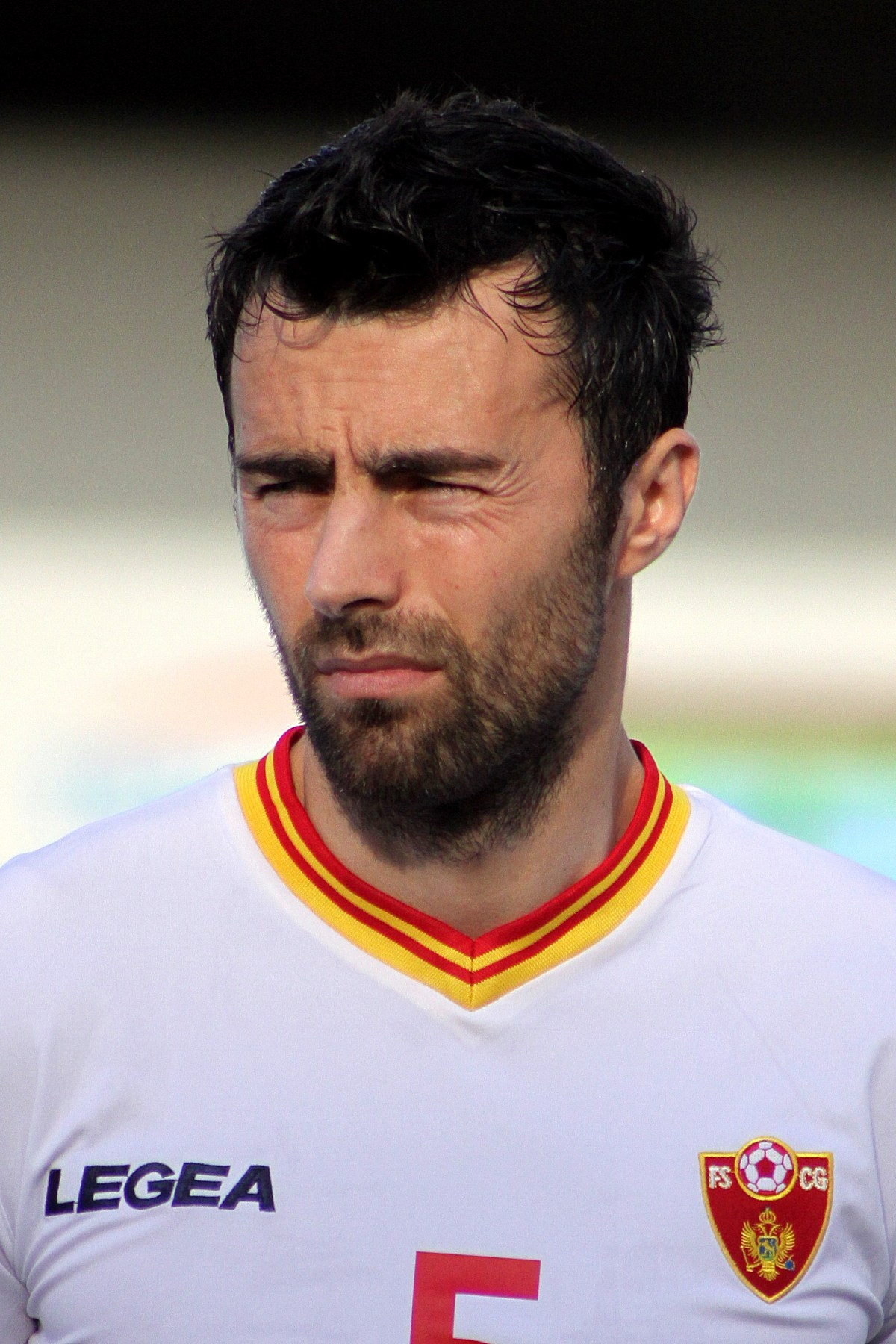
- Baša in 2014

Personal information
- Date of birth: 29 December 1982 (age 43)
- Place of birth: Trstenik, SR Serbia, Yugoslavia
- Height: 1.90 m (6 ft 3 in)
- Position: Centre back

Senior career*
| Years | Team | Apps | (Gls) |
| 1998–2000 | Trstenik PPT | 41 | (25) |
| 2000–2005 | OFK Beograd | 82 | (4) |
| 2001 | → Proleter Zrenjanin (loan) | 15 | (1) |
| 2005–2008 | Le Mans | 99 | (8) |
| 2008–2011 | Lokomotiv Moscow | 49 | (2) |
| 2011–2017 | Lille | 164 | (11) |
| Total | | 428 | (47) |

International career
| 2005 | Serbia and Montenegro | 3 | (0) |
| 2009–2017 | Montenegro | 39 | (2) |
Medal record
| Silver medal – second place | UEFA Under-21 Championship | 2004 |
- * Club domestic league appearances and goals

Marko Baša (Serbian Cyrillic: Марко Баша, pronounced [mâːrko bǎːʃa]; born 29 December 1982) is a Montenegrin retired professional footballer who played as a centre back.

== Club career ==
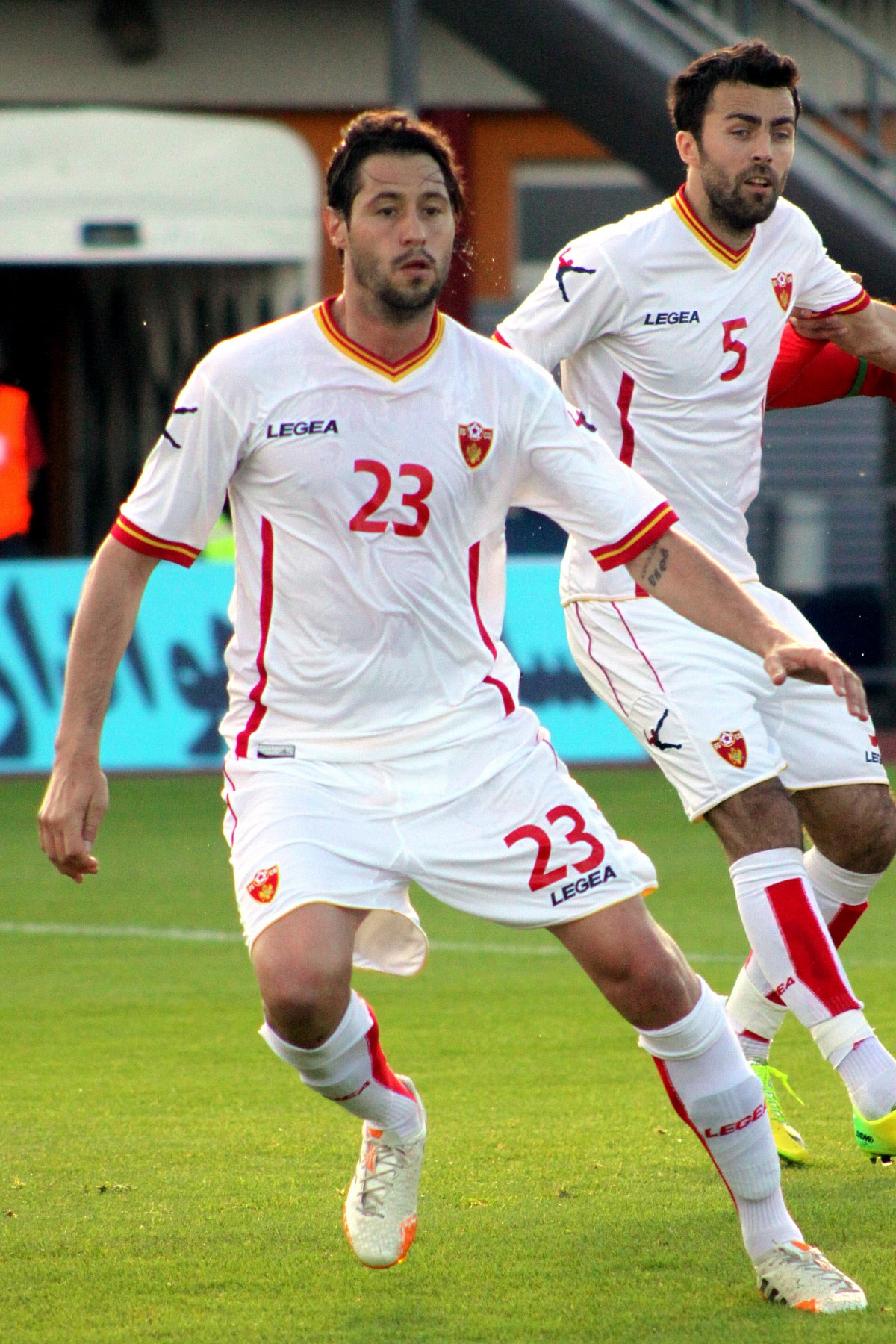
Marko Baša (5) playing for Montenegro in a friendly match against Iran in May 2014.

=== Lille ===
On 23 June 2011, Baša returned to France after three years in Russia with Lokomotiv Moscow, signing a contract with 2010–11 Ligue 1 champions Lille.

He is first choice for centre back. He scored his first goal for Lille against Olympique de Marseille in Trophée des champions. His team lost 4–5.

He scored his first goal in Ligue 1 for Lille on 23 October, against Olympique Lyonnais. His team won 3–1. He scored again in a 3–2 victory over Ajaccio on 3 December.

== International career ==
=== U21 ===
Baša won Olympic qualification by finishing runner-up at 2004 UEFA European Under-21 Football Championship.

He was part of the Serbia and Montenegro 2004 Olympic football team that exited in the first round, finishing fourth in Group C behind gold-medal winners Argentina, Australia and Tunisia.

=== Serbia and Montenegro ===
Baša capped a total of three times for Serbia and Montenegro in 2005. All were friendlies.

In the years after the dissolution of the state union of Serbia and Montenegro, Baša's international loyalty remained unclear. He received a call-up from Serbia national team by head coach Javier Clemente for the away friendly against Czech Republic on 16 August 2006 (first match since Montenegro left the state union) but did not show up - apparently because of an injury. Since then, his international loyalty was often a subject of press speculation, but he did not receive any more official call-ups from Serbia.

=== Montenegro ===
In March 2007 he was frequently quoted in Montenegrin press (namely Vijesti daily) saying that he wants to play for Montenegro, but he made himself unavailable for their inaugural match on 24 March 2007 due to, as he said, "objective circumstances". Then, in late May he apparently did not respond to Montenegrin football officials' attempts to get in touch with him and as a result he wasn't included in the team that went to Japan to play in Kirin Cup. Finally, Baša received a call-up from Montenegro for their friendly against Slovenia on 22 August 2007 but did not show up.

Only in February 2009, new information appeared that Baša is considering appearing for Montenegro again if he gets a call up after Montenegro national team coach Zoran Filipović insistence. He received a call-up against Italy in March 2009, and made his debut as starter. He earned a total of 39 caps, scoring 2 goals. His final international was a June 2017 friendly match against Iran.

== Personal life ==
Marko Baša was born in Trstenik, in central Serbia (at the time part of SR Serbia, SFR Yugoslavia). His father is from Rijeka Crnojevića.
