= Yoann Poulard =

French footballer (born 1976)

Personal information
- Date of birth: 1 July 1976 (age 50)
- Place of birth: Saint-Nazaire, France
- Height: 1.91 m (6 ft 3 in)
- Position: Defender

Team information
- Current team: SNAF (staff)

Youth career
- 1982–1993: SNAF
- 1993–1994: Angers SCO

Senior career*
Years	Team	Apps	(Gls)
1994–1998	Angers SCO	39	(0)
1998–2006	Le Mans	248	(1)
2006–2007	Brest	39	(2)
2007–2009	FC Nantes	60	(2)
2009–2013	AC Ajaccio	115	(6)
Total		501	(11)

Managerial career
- 2013–2020: AC Ajaccio (staff)
- 2021–: SNAF (staff)
- * Club domestic league appearances and goals

Yoann Poulard (born 1 July 1976) is a former French footballer who played in the position of right defender.

== Career ==
=== Post-retirement ===
After retiring from football in the summer of 2013, Poulard was hired as deputy sports director at AC Ajaccio, the club he had played with in his last four years before retiring. He left the club in 2020.

In November 2021, Poulard returned to his childhood club, SNAF, where he would be responsible for structuring the club on all fronts.
