= 2009–10 Lille OSC season =

Lille
2009–10 season
- Chairman: Michel Seydoux
- Manager: Rudi Garcia
- Stadium: Stadium Lille Métropole
- Ligue 1: 4th
- Coupe de France: Round of 64
- Coupe de la Ligue: Quarter-finals
- UEFA Europa League: Round of 16
Home colours	Away colours	Third colours

The 2009–10 season was Lille Olympique Sporting Club's 10th consecutive season in the top flight of French football. In addition to the domestic league, Lille participated in this season's editions of the Coupe de France, the Coupe de la Ligue and the UEFA Europa League.

== Squad ==
Squad at end of season

Note: Flags indicate national team as defined under FIFA eligibility rules; some limited exceptions apply. Players may hold more than one non-FIFA nationality.

No.	Pos.	Nation	Player
1	GK	FRA	Ludovic Butelle
2	DF	FRA	Mathieu Debuchy
3	DF	GHA	Jerry Vandam
4	MF	FRA	Florent Balmont
5	MF	FRA	Yannis Salibur
6	DF	SEN	Pape Souaré
7	MF	FRA	Yohan Cabaye
8	DF	POR	Ricardo Costa
9	FW	BRA	Túlio de Melo
10	MF	POL	Ludovic Obraniak
11	FW	GAB	Pierre-Emerick Aubameyang
15	DF	BRA	Emerson
16	GK	FRA	Mickaël Landreau
17	FW	FRA	Pierre-Alain Frau

No.	Pos.	Nation	Player
18	DF	FRA	Franck Béria
20	FW	GUI	Larsen Touré
22	DF	CMR	Aurélien Chedjou
23	DF	FRA	Adil Rami
24	MF	FRA	Rio Mavuba
25	DF	FRA	Nicolas Plestan
26	MF	BEL	Eden Hazard
27	FW	CIV	Gervinho
29	MF	FRA	Stéphane Dumont
30	GK	FRA	Alexandre Oukidja
40	GK	CGO	Barel Mouko
—	MF	SEN	Idrissa Gueye
—	DF	FRA	Jonathan Rivierez
—	MF	FRA	Arnaud Souquet

== Competitions ==
=== Overview ===
Competition	First match	Last match	Starting round	Final position	Record							
Competition	First match	Last match	Starting round	Final position	Pld	W	D	L	GF	GA	GD	Win %
Ligue 1	9 August 2009	15 May 2010	Matchday 1	4th	38	21	7	10	72	40	+32	55.26
Coupe de France	23 January 2010	23 January 2010	Round of 64	Round of 64	1	0	1	0	0	0	+0	0.00
Coupe de la Ligue	13 January 2010	27 January 2010	Round of 16	Quarter-finals	2	1	0	1	4	3	+1	50.00
UEFA Europa League	30 July 2009	18 March 2010	Third qualifying round	Round of 16	14	9	2	3	29	17	+12	64.29
Total					55	31	10	14	105	60	+45	56.36

Source: Competitions

=== Ligue 1 ===
==== League table ====
Pos	Team	Pld	W	D	L	GF	GA	GD	Pts	Qualification or relegation
2	Lyon	38	20	12	6	64	38	+26	72	Qualification to Champions League group stage
3	Auxerre	38	20	11	7	42	29	+13	71	Qualification to Champions League play-off round
4	Lille	38	21	7	10	72	40	+32	70	Qualification to Europa League play-off round (Note: Coupe de France winners Paris Saint-Germain qualify for the 2010–11 UEFA Europa League Play-off round of 2010–11 UEFA Europa League.)
5	Montpellier	38	20	9	9	50	40	+10	69	Qualification to Europa League third qualifying round (Note: Coupe de la Ligue winners Marseille finished as champions, fulfilling a finish of at least 4th place, thus their Europa League Third qualifying round berth will go to the 5th placed team in the league.)
6	Bordeaux	38	19	7	12	58	40	+18	64	

Source: Ligue 1
Rules for classification: 1) points; 2) goal difference; 3) number of goals scored.

==== Results summary ====
Overall								Home						Away					
Pld	W	D	L	GF	GA	GD	Pts	W	D	L	GF	GA	GD	W	D	L	GF	GA	GD
38	21	7	10	72	40	+32	70	14	3	2	44	15	+29	7	4	8	28	25	+3

Source: Soccerway

==== Matches ====
9 August 2009 1	Lille	1–2	Lorient	Villeneuve-d'Ascq
17:00 CEST (UTC+2)	Balmont (yellow card) 63'; Monterrubio 66' (o.g.); Mavuba (yellow card) 88'	Report	Gameiro 33'; Koscielny (yellow card) 34'; Vahirua 52'; Jouffre (yellow card) 57'; Marchal (yellow card) 80'; Amalfitano (yellow card) 88'; Audard (yellow card) 90'	Stadium: Stadium Lille Métropole; Referee: Pascal Vileo; Assistant referees: Pierre Chevreux, Fabrice Plancon; Fourth official: Dominique Julien

16 August 2009 2	Marseille	1–0	Lille	Montpellier
21:00 CEST (UTC+2)	Brandão 11'; Heinze (yellow card) 20'; Niang (yellow card) 78'; Valbuena (yellow card) 90'	Report	Debuchy (yellow card) 21' (yellow-red card) 64'; Butelle (yellow card) 66'; Mavuba (yellow card) 90'	Stadium: Stade de la Mosson; Referee: Fredy Fautrel; Assistant referees: Cyril Gringore, Fabrice Meslin; Fourth official: Wilfried Bien

23 August 2009 3	Lille	1–1	Toulouse	Villeneuve-d'Ascq
21:00 CEST (UTC+2)	Vittek 44'	Report	Gignac (yellow card) 27'; M'Bengue (yellow card) 69', (goal) 74'; Mansaré (yellow card) 83'	Stadium: Stadium Lille Métropole; Referee: Alexandre Castro; Assistant referees: Frédéric Cano, Djemel Zitouni; Fourth official: Yohann Rouinsard

30 August 2009 4	Paris Saint-Germain	3–0	Lille	Paris
17:00 CEST (UTC+2)	Clément 27'; Luyindula 78'; Jallet 90'	Report	Emerson (yellow card) 88'; Balmont (yellow card) 90'	Stadium: Parc des Princes; Referee: Olivier Thual; Assistant referees: David Durussel, Cyril Saint-Cricq Lompre; Fourth official: Bartolomeu Varela Teles

12 September 2009 5	Lille	1–0	Sochaux	Villeneuve-d'Ascq
19:00 CEST (UTC+2)	Frau 71'	Report	Mikari (yellow card) 22'; Maurice-Belay (yellow card) 70'	Stadium: Stadium Lille Métropole; Referee: Ruddy Buquet; Assistant referees: Cyril Gringore, Fabrice Meslin; Fourth official: Dominique Julien

20 September 2009 6	Lens	1–1	Lille	Lens
17:00 CEST (UTC+2)	Jemâa (yellow card) 47'; Boukari 58', (yellow card) 86'; Laurenti (yellow card) 68'; Runje (yellow card) 69'	Report	Cabaye (red card) 72'; Rami 90'	Stadium: Stade Félix-Bollaert; Referee: Stéphane Bré; Assistant referees: Nicolas Pottier, Laurent Stien; Fourth official: Olivier Husset

27 September 2009 7	Lille	1–1	Nice	Villeneuve-d'Ascq
17:00 CEST (UTC+2)	Balmont (yellow card) 44'; Mavuba (yellow card) 85'; Frau 89'	Report	Sablé (yellow card) 13'; Rémy 61'; Echouafni (yellow card) 74'	Stadium: Stadium Lille Métropole; Referee: Clément Turpin; Assistant referees: Eric Danizan, Cédric Schurra; Fourth official: Alban Hung

4 October 2009 8	Boulogne	2–3	Lille	Boulogne-sur-Mer
17:00 CEST (UTC+2)	Agouazi (yellow card) 23'; Dembélé 33'; Blayac 44', (yellow card) 74'; Rabuel (yellow card) 63'	Report	Gervinho 42'; Balmont (yellow card) 50'; Frau 51', 57'	Stadium: Stade de la Libération; Referee: Pascal Vileo; Assistant referees: Michel Magnoni, Fabrice Plancon; Fourth official: Stéphane Jochem

17 October 2009 9	Lille	0–0	Rennes	Villeneuve-d'Ascq
21:00 CEST (UTC+2)	Emerson (yellow card) 82'	Report	Marveaux (yellow card) 65'	Stadium: Stadium Lille Métropole; Referee: Saïd Ennjimi; Assistant referees: Frédéric Cano, Djemel Zitouni; Fourth official: Jean-Charles Cailleux

25 October 2009 10	Auxerre	3–2	Lille	Auxerre
17:00 CET (UTC+1)	Jeleń 36', 78'; Niculae 82', (yellow card) 83'; Capoue (yellow card) 83'	Report	Gervinho 26'; Frau 40'; Béria (yellow card) 65'	Stadium: Stade de l'Abbé-Deschamps; Referee: Sébastien Moreira; Assistant referees: Michel Magnoni, Hüseyin Ocak; Fourth official: David Mezouar

31 October 2009 12	Grenoble	0–2	Lille	Grenoble
19:00 CET (UTC+1)	Courtois (yellow card) 18'; Jemmali (yellow card) 42', (red card) 44'; Cesar (yellow card) 71'	Report	Cabaye 27'; Hazard (yellow card) 55'; Gervinho 90'	Stadium: Stade des Alpes; Referee: Bruno Coue; Assistant referees: Christophe Capelli, Cyril Saint-Cricq Lompre; Fourth official: Yohann Rouinsard

8 November 2009 13	Lille	2–0	Bordeaux	Villeneuve-d'Ascq
17:00 CET (UTC+1)	Béria (yellow card) 40'; Cabaye 68'; Balmont 87' (pen.)	Report	Fernando (yellow card) 54'; Diarra (yellow card) 90'	Stadium: Stadium Lille Métropole; Referee: Hervé Piccirillo; Assistant referees: David Benech, Fredji Harchay; Fourth official: Floris Aubin

22 November 2009 14	Montpellier	2–0	Lille	Montpellier
21:00 CET (UTC+1)	Jeunechamp (yellow card) 25'; Montaño (yellow card) 37', (goal) 65', 87'	Report	Béria (yellow card) 22'; Rami (yellow card) 37'; Gervinho (yellow card) 69'; Balmont (yellow card) 85'	Stadium: Stade de la Mosson; Referee: Philippe Kalt; Assistant referees: Michael Annonier, Fabrice Plancon; Fourth official: Sébastien Desiage

28 November 2009 15	Lille	4–0	Valenciennes	Villeneuve-d'Ascq
19:00 CET (UTC+1)	Debuchy (yellow card) 24'; Obraniak (yellow card) 28'; Frau 42'; Gervinho 52', 61'; Cabaye 87' (pen.)	Report	Tiéné (yellow card) 35'; Baldé (yellow card) 40'; Ben Khalfallah (yellow card) 51'; Sánchez (yellow card) 73'	Stadium: Stadium Lille Métropole; Referee: Lionel Jaffredo; Assistant referees: Didier Martin, Tugdual Philippe; Fourth official: Sébastien Butault

6 December 2009 16	Lille	4–3	Lyon	Villeneuve-d'Ascq
21:00 CET (UTC+1)	Gervinho (yellow card) 11', (goal) 53', 90'; Frau 24'; Chedjou (yellow card) 44'; Rami (yellow card) 44'; Cabaye 70' (pen.)	Report	López 2', 22' (pen.), 35'; Makoun (yellow card) 27'; Gomis (yellow card) 40'; Govou (yellow card) 49'; Cris (yellow card) 90'; Réveillère (yellow card) 90'	Stadium: Stadium Lille Métropole; Referee: Fredy Fautrel; Assistant referees: Cyril Gringore, Fabrice Meslin; Fourth official: Cédric Cotrel

10 December 2009 11	Lille	4–0	Saint-Étienne	Villeneuve-d'Ascq
19:00 CET (UTC+1)	Frau 33'; Cabaye 58' (pen.); Gervinho 72'; Rami 82'	Report	Fernandes (yellow card) 14'; N'Daw (yellow card) 69'; Benalouane (yellow card) 71' (yellow-red card) 81'	Stadium: Stadium Lille Métropole; Referee: Stéphane Bré; Assistant referees: David Durussel, Laurent Stien; Fourth official: Alban Hung

13 December 2009 17	Monaco	0–4	Lille	Monaco
17:00 CET (UTC+1)	Puygrenier (yellow card) 21'; Park (yellow card) 26'; Adriano (yellow card) 53' (yellow-red card) 71'	Report	De Melo 38', 55'; Hazard (yellow card) 42'; Cabaye 72' (pen.); Aubameyang 85'	Stadium: Stade Louis II; Referee: Wilfried Bien; Assistant referees: Eric Danizan, Cédric Schurra; Fourth official: Philippe Gasquet

20 December 2009 18	Lille	3–0	Le Mans	Villeneuve-d'Ascq
17:00 CET (UTC+1)	Chedjou 12'; Balmont (penalty missed) 14'; Gervinho (yellow card) 22', (goal) 27'; Hazard 29'	Report	Camara (yellow card) 13'; Thomas (yellow card) 25'	Stadium: Stadium Lille Métropole; Referee: Olivier Thual; Assistant referees: Stéphane Mercier, Cyril Saint-Cricq Lompre; Fourth official: Stéphane Jochem

23 December 2009 19	Nancy	0–4	Lille	Tomblaine
19:00 CET (UTC+1)	André Luiz (yellow card) 41'; Sami (red card) 60'	Report	Frau (yellow card) 23', (goal) 60' (pen.); Balmont (yellow card) 36'; Hazard 42'; Gervinho 51', 72'	Stadium: Stade Marcel Picot; Referee: Pascal Vileo; Assistant referees: Stephan Luzi, Fabrice Plancon; Fourth official: Albert Toussaint (Luxembourg)

16 January 2010 20	Lille	3–1	Paris Saint-Germain	Villeneuve-d'Ascq
21:00 CET (UTC+1)	Obraniak 5'; Balmont (yellow card) 32', (goal) 52'; Mavuba (yellow card) 54'; Béria 68'; Debuchy (yellow card) 88'	Report	Armand (yellow card) 10'; Traoré (yellow card) 34'; Erdinç 83'	Stadium: Stadium Lille Métropole; Referee: Saïd Ennjimi; Assistant referees: Frédéric Cano, Djemel Zitouni; Fourth official: Bartolomeu Varela Teles

20 January 2010 21	Sochaux	2–1	Lille	Montbéliard
19:00 CET (UTC+1)	Perquis 8', (yellow card) 86'; Dalmat 11'; Martin (yellow card) 18'; Richert (yellow card) 23'	Report	Rami (yellow card) 17'; Cabaye (yellow card) 24', (penalty missed) 24'; Balmont (yellow card) 59'; Vittek 76'	Stadium: Stade Auguste-Bonal; Referee: Bruno Coue; Assistant referees: Stephan Luzi, Fabrice Plancon; Fourth official: Frank Schneider

30 January 2010 22	Lille	1–0	Lens	Villeneuve-d'Ascq
19:00 CET (UTC+1)	Hazard 22'; Béria (yellow card) 90'	Report	Sow (yellow card) 2'; Hermach (yellow card) 44'; Chelle (yellow card) 90'	Stadium: Stadium Lille Métropole; Referee: Alain Hamer (Luxembourg); Assistant referees: David García (Spain), Tugdual Philippe; Fourth official: Jean-Charles Cailleux

6 February 2010 23	Nice	1–1	Lille	Nice
19:00 CET (UTC+1)	Ben Saada 16'; Diakité (yellow card) 32'; Cantareil (yellow card) 56'; Poté (yellow card) 81'	Report	Mavuba (yellow card) 29'; Rami (yellow card) 41'; De Melo 75'; Béria (yellow card) 84'	Stadium: Stade du Ray; Referee: Damien Ledentu; Assistant referees: Stephane Duhamel, David Durussel; Fourth official: Julien Schmitt

13 February 2010 24	Lille	3–1	Boulogne	Villeneuve-d'Ascq
19:00 CET (UTC+1)	Obraniak 5', 43'; Rami 10'; De Melo (yellow card) 90'	Report	Ducatel (yellow card) 12'; Adefemi 28'; Marcq (yellow card) 74'; Dembélé (yellow card) 77'	Stadium: Stadium Lille Métropole; Referee: Lionel Jaffredo; Assistant referees: Didier Martin, Tugdual Philippe; Fourth official: Olivier Husset

21 February 2010 25	Rennes	1–2	Lille	Rennes
21:00 CET (UTC+1)	Leroy 26'; Mangane (yellow card) 34'	Report	Frau 10'; Aubameyang 89'; Rami (yellow card) 90'	Stadium: Stade de la Route de Lorient; Referee: Pascal Vileo; Assistant referees: Christophe Capelli, Fabrice Plancon; Fourth official: Stéphane Djouzi

28 February 2010 26	Lille	1–2	Auxerre	Villeneuve-d'Ascq
19:00 CET (UTC+1)	Hazard 34'; Chedjou (yellow card) 36'; Costa (yellow card) 53'; Rami (yellow card) 80'	Report	Capoue (yellow card) 18'; Contout 19', 72'; Grichting (yellow card) 29'; Mignot (yellow card) 59'; Berthod (yellow card) 70'; N'Dinga (yellow card) 73'; Oliech (yellow card) 87'	Stadium: Stadium Lille Métropole; Referee: Bruno Coue; Assistant referees: David Benech, Fredji Harchay; Fourth official: Philippe Chat

6 March 2010 27	Saint-Étienne	1–1	Lille	Saint-Étienne
21:00 CET (UTC+1)	Rivière 17'; Diakhaté (yellow card) 40'; Perrin (yellow card) 62'	Report	Dumont 22'; Mavuba (yellow card) 73'	Stadium: Stade Geoffroy-Guichard; Referee: Sébastien Moreira; Assistant referees: Michel Magnoni, Cédric Schurra; Fourth official: Philippe Gasquet

14 March 2010 28	Lille	1–0	Grenoble	Villeneuve-d'Ascq
17:00 CET (UTC+1)	Balmont (yellow card) 24'; Cesar 47' (o.g.)	Report	Matsui (yellow card) 20'; Romao (yellow card) 24'; Calvé (yellow card) 40'; Cesar (yellow card) 55'; Dieuze (yellow card) 86'	Stadium: Stadium Lille Métropole; Referee: Olivier Thual; Assistant referees: Christophe Capelli, Cyril Saint-Cricq Lompre; Fourth official: Sébastien Butault

21 March 2010 29	Bordeaux	3–1	Lille	Bordeaux
17:00 CET (UTC+1)	Ciani 39'; Jussiê 66' (pen.); Gourcuff 76'	Report	Costa (yellow card) 10' (yellow-red card) 66'; Hazard 23'; Rami (yellow card) 32'	Stadium: Stade Chaban-Delmas; Referee: Philippe Malige; Assistant referees: Didier Grenier, Stéphane Mercier; Fourth official: Bartolomeu Varela Teles

28 March 2010 30	Lille	4–1	Montpellier	Villeneuve-d'Ascq
21:00 CEST (UTC+2)	Gervinho 17'; Béria (yellow card) 25'; Cabaye 53' (pen.); Frau 58'; Balmont (yellow card) 64'; Touré 79'	Report	Yanga-Mbiwa (yellow card) 26'; Costa (yellow card) 31'; Camara 46'; Montaño (yellow card) 55'; Pitau (yellow card) 68'; Jeunechamp (yellow card) 89'	Stadium: Stadium Lille Métropole; Referee: Clément Turpin; Assistant referees: Emmanuel Boisdenghien, Stephane Duhamel; Fourth official: Dominique Julien

3 April 2010 31	Valenciennes	1–0	Lille	Valenciennes
19:00 CEST (UTC+2)	Mater (yellow card) 27'; Samassa 82'; Ben Khalfallah (yellow card) 90'	Report	Béria (yellow card) 23'; Debuchy (yellow card) 59'; Chedjou (yellow card) 90'; Mavuba (yellow card) 90'	Stadium: Stade Nungesser; Referee: Fredy Fautrel; Assistant referees: Nicolas Danos, Hubert Lopez; Fourth official: Frank Schneider

11 April 2010 32	Lyon	1–1	Lille	Lyon
17:00 CEST (UTC+2)	Gonalons (yellow card) 40' (yellow-red card) 79'; Källström (yellow card) 61'; Cris 71'	Report	Mavuba (yellow card) 19'; Hazard (yellow card) 28'; Rami (yellow card) 44'; Frau 62'; Costa (yellow card) 63' (yellow-red card) 70'; Balmont (yellow card) 76'	Stadium: Stade de Gerland; Referee: Philippe Kalt; Assistant referees: Eric Dansault, Laurent Ugo; Fourth official: William Lavis

18 April 2010 33	Lille	4–0	Monaco	Villeneuve-d'Ascq
17:00 CEST (UTC+2)	Chedjou 14'; Cabaye 44' (pen.), 75'; De Melo 90'	Report	Lolo (yellow card) 44'; Haruna (yellow card) 51'	Stadium: Stadium Lille Métropole; Referee: Laurent Duhamel; Assistant referees: Stephane Duhamel, Tugdual Philippe; Fourth official: Frank Schneider

24 April 2010 34	Le Mans	1–2	Lille	Le Mans
19:00 CEST (UTC+2)	Narry (yellow card) 37'; Maïga 56'; Corchia (yellow card) 61'; Abdi (yellow card) 72'; Goulon (yellow card) 77'	Report	De Melo 13', (yellow card) 90'; Mavuba (yellow card) 42'; Landreau (yellow card) 57'; Chedjou (yellow card) 57'; Cabaye 79' (pen.)	Stadium: Stade Léon-Bollée; Referee: Christian Guillard; Assistant referees: Pierre Chevreux, Nicolas Danos; Fourth official: Stéphane Jochem

2 May 2010 35	Lille	3–1	Nancy	Villeneuve-d'Ascq
17:00 CEST (UTC+2)	Cabaye 33', (yellow card) 59'; Gervinho 35'; Chedjou (yellow card) 37'; Frau 49'; Béria (yellow card) 78'	Report	André Luiz (yellow card) 32'; Chrétien (yellow card) 42'; Malonga 55'	Stadium: Stadium Lille Métropole; Referee: Sébastien Moreira; Assistant referees: Didier Martin, Hüseyin Ocak; Fourth official: Bartolomeu Varela Teles

5 May 2010 36	Toulouse	0–2	Lille	Toulouse
19:00 CEST (UTC+2)	Sirieix (yellow card) 9'; Ebondo (yellow card) 36'; Berson (yellow card) 61'	Report	Cabaye (yellow card) 22', (goal) 34'; Obraniak 48'	Stadium: Stadium Municipal; Referee: Alexandre Castro; Assistant referees: Didier Grenier, Stéphane Mercier; Fourth official: Johan Hamel

8 May 2010 37	Lille	3–2	Marseille	Villeneuve-d'Ascq
21:00 CEST (UTC+2)	Balmont (yellow card) 17'; Cabaye 28' (pen.), (yellow card) 32'; Rami (yellow card) 40'; De Melo 81'; Debuchy 90'	Report	Niang 6', (yellow card) 42'; Cheyrou (yellow card) 17'; Mandanda (red card) 25'; Hilton 44'; Andrade (yellow card) 63'	Stadium: Stadium Lille Métropole; Referee: Fredy Fautrel; Assistant referees: Cyril Gringore, Fabrice Meslin; Fourth official: Wilfried Bien

15 May 2010 38	Lorient	2–1	Lille	Lorient
21:00 CEST (UTC+2)	Marchal (yellow card) 31'; Gameiro 37'; Audard (yellow card) 48'; Sosa (yellow card) 54'; Jouffre 65'; Dubarbier (yellow card) 86'; Vahirua (red card) 90'	Report	Gervinho (yellow card) 27'; Costa 32', (yellow card) 34'; Chedjou (yellow card) 90'	Stadium: Stade du Moustoir; Referee: Ruddy Buquet; Assistant referees: Frédéric Cano, Djemel Zitouni; Fourth official: Yohann Rouinsard

=== Coupe de France ===
23 January 2010 Round of 64	Colmar	0–0 (10–9 p)	Lille	Colmar
15:00 CET (UTC+1)		Report		Stadium: Colmar Stadium
Note: Colmar won 10–9 on penalties.

=== Coupe de la Ligue ===
13 January 2010 Round of 16	Lille	3–1 (a.e.t.)	Rennes	Villeneuve-d'Ascq
19:00 CET (UTC+1)	Rami 40'; Béria (yellow card) 72'; De Melo 96'; Debuchy (yellow card) 100'; Hazard 115'	Report	Hansson (yellow card) 16'; Thomert (yellow card) 47'; Pagis 59'; Lemoine (yellow card) 60'	Stadium: Stadium Lille Métropole; Referee: Ruddy Buquet; Assistant referees: Emmanuel Boisdenghien, Cyril Gringore; Fourth official: Benoît Millot

27 January 2010 Quarter-finals	Marseille	2–1	Lille	Marseille
20:45 CET (UTC+1)	Niang (yellow card) 8'; González 10', (yellow card) 54'; Valbuena 81'	Report	De Melo 4'; Cabaye (yellow card) 22' (yellow-red card) 56'	Stadium: Stade Vélodrome; Referee: Hervé Piccirillo; Assistant referees: David Benech, Fredji Harchay; Fourth official: Yohann Rouinsard

=== UEFA Europa League ===
==== Qualifying rounds ====
===== Third qualifying round =====
30 July 2009 First leg	Sevojno (Serbia)	0–2	(France) Lille	Belgrade, Serbia (Note: The match was played at the Partizan Stadium in Belgrade, instead of Sevojno regular stadium, the Stadion kraj Valjaonice in Sevojno, which did not meet UEFA requirements.)
20:45 CEST (UTC+2)	Bulatović (yellow card) 16'; Vujović (yellow card) 39'; Raković (yellow card) 75'; Timić (yellow card) 87'	Report	Rami (yellow card) 25'; Vittek 34'; Hazard 39'; Plestan (yellow card) 41' (yellow-red card) 90'; Obraniak (yellow card) 53'	Stadium: Partizan Stadium; Attendance: 1,992; Referee: Martin Ingvarsson (Sweden); Assistant referees: Peter Ekström (Sweden), Fredrik Nilsson (Sweden); Fourth official: Magnus Ahlsèn (Sweden)

6 August 2009 Second leg	Lille (France)	2–0 (4–0 agg.)	(Serbia) Sevojno	Villeneuve-d'Ascq, France
19:00 CEST (UTC+2)	Balmont (yellow card) 49'; Chedjou (yellow card) 69'; Cabaye 72'; De Melo 85'; Butelle (yellow card) 87'	Report	Ćosić (yellow card) 59'; Pavićević (yellow card) 70'; Janković (yellow card) 78'	Stadium: Stadium Lille Métropole; Attendance: 15,053; Referee: Michael Koukoulakis (Greece); Assistant referees: Christos Akrivos (Greece), Dimitrios Saraidaris (Greece); Fourth official: Stavros Tritsonis (Greece)
Note: Lille won 4–0 on aggregate.

==== Play-off round ====
20 August 2009 First leg	Genk (Belgium)	1–2	(France) Lille	Genk, Belgium
20:45 CEST (UTC+2)	Hubert (yellow card) 22'; Tőzsér 58', (yellow card) 63'; Pudil (yellow card) 59'	Report	Debuchy (yellow card) 13'; Dumont 40'; Vittek 56'; Rami (yellow card) 60'	Stadium: Cristal Arena; Attendance: 12,278; Referee: Anton Genov (Bulgaria); Assistant referees: Krassimir Kerezov (Bulgaria), Veselin Dobriyanov (Bulgaria); Fourth official: Stanislav Todorov (Bulgaria)

27 August 2009 Second leg	Lille (France)	4–2 (6–3 agg.)	(Belgium) Genk	Villeneuve-d'Ascq, France
18:45 CEST (UTC+2)	De Melo 10', 73'; Cabaye (yellow card) 15'; Dumont 59'; Hazard 70'	Report	Daeseleire (yellow card) 16'; Barda 24' (pen.); Koita (yellow card) 61'; Pudil (yellow card) 68' (yellow-red card) 83'; Tőzsér 86'	Stadium: Stadium Lille Métropole; Attendance: 16,055; Referee: Gianluca Rocchi (Italy); Assistant referees: Flaviano Lanciano (Italy), Elenito Di Liberatore (Italy); Fourth official: Nicola Stefanini (Italy)
Note: Lille won 6–3 on aggregate.

==== Group stage ====
Pos	Team	Pld	W	D	L	GF	GA	GD	Pts	Qualification	VAL	LIL	GEN	SLV
1	(Spain) Valencia	6	3	3	0	12	8	+4	12	Advance to knockout phase	—	3–1	3–2	1–1
2	(France) Lille	6	3	1	2	15	9	+6	10	Advance to knockout phase	1–1	—	3–0	3–1
3	(Italy) Genoa	6	2	1	3	8	10	−2	7		1–2	3–2	—	2–0
4	(Czech Republic) Slavia Prague	6	0	3	3	5	13	−8	3		2–2	1–5	0–0	—

Source: Soccerway

17 September 2009 1	Lille (France)	1–1	(Spain) Valencia	Villeneuve d'Ascq, France
19:00 CEST (UTC+2)	Balmont (yellow card) 46'; Obraniak (yellow card) 73'; Gervinho 86'	Report	Bruno (yellow card) 25'; Alba (yellow card) 63'; Mata 78'; Maduro (yellow card) 90+3'	Stadium: Stadium Lille-Metropole; Attendance: 14,676; Referee: Alexandru Tudor (Romania); Assistant referees: Cristian Nica (Romania), Aurel Oniţă (Romania); Fourth official: Radu Petrescu (Romania); Goal-line assistants: Marius Avram (Romania), Ovidiu Hațegan (Romania)

1 October 2009 2	Slavia Prague (Czech Republic)	1–5	(France) Lille	Prague, Czech Republic
21:05 CEST (UTC+2)	Belaïd 6' (pen.); Volešák (yellow card) 58'	Report	Butelle (yellow card) 5'; Suchý 47' (o.g.); Dumont (yellow card) 50'; Frau 71'; Gervinho 85', 90+1'; Souquet 88'	Stadium: Synot Tip Arena; Attendance: 9,158; Referee: Robert Schörgenhofer (Austria); Assistant referees: Alain Hoxha (Austria), Mario Strudl (Austria); Fourth official: Thomas Prammer (Austria); Goal-line assistants: Thomas Gangl (Austria), Stefan Messner (Austria)

22 October 2009 3	Lille (France)	3–0	(Italy) Genoa	Villeneuve d'Ascq, France
21:05 CEST (UTC+2)	Cabaye (yellow card) 23'; Obraniak 38', (yellow card) 71'; Vittek 63'; Hazard 84', (yellow card) 85'	Report	Bocchetti (yellow card) 27'; Mesto (yellow card) 35'; Esposito (yellow card) 40'; Palacio (yellow card) 71'	Stadium: Stadium Lille-Metropole; Attendance: 16,518; Referee: Darko Čeferin (Slovenia); Assistant referees: Andrej Kokolj (Slovenia), Bojan Ul (Slovenia); Fourth official: Peter Sart (Slovenia); Goal-line assistants: Matej Jug (Slovenia), Dragoslav Perič (Slovenia)

5 November 2009 4	Genoa (Italy)	3–2	(France) Lille	Genoa, Italy
19:00 CET (UTC+1)	Palacio 14'; Moretti (yellow card) 36'; Zapater (yellow card) 43'; Crespo 58'; Sculli 90+3', (yellow card) 90+3'	Report	Béria (yellow card) 56'; Vandam (yellow card) 64'; Frau 76'; Gervinho 84'; Landreau (yellow card) 90+3'	Stadium: Stadio Luigi Ferraris; Attendance: 18,587; Referee: Bas Nijhuis (Netherlands); Assistant referees: Coen Droste (Netherlands), Wilco Lobbert (Netherlands); Fourth official: Michel Winter (Netherlands); Goal-line assistants: Pol van Boekel (Netherlands), Peter Janssen (Netherlands)

2 December 2009 5	Valencia (Spain)	3–1	(France) Lille	Valencia, Spain
21:05 CET (UTC+1)	Joaquín 3', 32'; Alexis (yellow card) 44'; Mata 52'; Banega (yellow card) 67'; Miku (yellow card) 89'	Report	Gervinho (yellow card) 20'; Cabaye (yellow card) 56'; Chedjou (yellow card) 89', (goal) 90+1'; Debuchy (yellow card) 90+4'	Stadium: Mestalla; Attendance: 26,193; Referee: Mike Dean (England); Assistant referees: Simon Beck (England), Richard West (England); Fourth official: Mike Jones (England); Goal-line assistants: Andre Marriner (England), Lee Probert (England)

17 December 2009 6	Lille (France)	3–1	(Czech Republic) Slavia Prague	Villeneuve d'Ascq, France
19:00 CET (UTC+1)	Cabaye 25'; Gervinho 40'; Balmont (yellow card) 73'; Obraniak 80'	Report	Hubáček (yellow card) 45'; Janda (yellow card) 51'; Vlček 56'	Stadium: Stadium Lille-Metropole; Attendance: 15,358; Referee: Hannes Kaasik (Estonia); Assistant referees: Silver Koiv (Estonia), Marko Leevand (Estonia); Fourth official: Jaan Roos (Estonia); Goal-line assistants: Sten Kaldma (Estonia), Eiko Saar (Estonia)

==== Knockout phase ====
===== Round of 32 =====
18 February 2010 First leg	Lille (France)	2–1	(Turkey) Fenerbahçe	Villeneuve-d'Ascq, France
19:00 CET (UTC+1)	Balmont 3', (yellow card) 6'; Frau 52'; Cabaye (yellow card) 79'	Report	Vederson 5'; Belözoğlu (yellow card) 39'; Santos (yellow card) 71'	Stadium: Stadium Lille Métropole; Attendance: 16,783; Referee: Eduardo Iturralde González (Spain); Assistant referees: Jon Núñez (Spain), Roberto Díaz Pérez del Palomar (Spain); Fourth official: Xavier Estrada Fernández (Spain); Goal-line assistants: Carlos Clos Gómez (Spain), César Muñiz Fernández (Spain)

25 February 2010 Second leg	Fenerbahçe (Turkey)	1–1 (2–3 agg.)	(France) Lille	Istanbul, Turkey
22:05 EET (UTC+2)	Belözoğlu 35'; Vederson (yellow card) 60'; Bilica (yellow card) 85'	Report	Rami 85'	Stadium: Şükrü Saracoğlu Stadium; Attendance: 38,740; Referee: Florian Meyer (Germany); Assistant referees: Robert Hartmann (Germany), Holger Henschel (Germany); Fourth official: Michael Weiner (Germany); Goal-line assistants: Babak Rafati (Germany), Peter Sippel (Germany)
Note: Lille won 3–2 on aggregate.

===== Round of 16 =====
11 March 2010 First leg	Lille (France)	1–0	(England) Liverpool	Villeneuve-d'Ascq, France
19:00 CET (UTC+1)	Hazard 84'; Touré (yellow card) 85'; Aubameyang (yellow card) 88'	Report	Insúa (yellow card) 63'; Torres (yellow card) 67'	Stadium: Stadium Lille Métropole; Attendance: 17,931; Referee: Claus Bo Larsen (Denmark); Assistant referees: Anders Nørrestrand (Denmark), Henrik Sønderby (Denmark); Fourth official: Nicolai Vollquartz (Denmark); Goal-line assistants: Anders Hermansen (Denmark), Peter Rasmussen (Denmark)

18 March 2010 Second leg	Liverpool (England)	3–0 (3–1 agg.)	(France) Lille	Liverpool, England
21:05 GMT (UTC)	Gerrard 9' (pen.); Insúa (yellow card) 42'; Torres 49', 89', (yellow card) 73'	Report	Cabaye (yellow card) 80'; Obraniak (yellow card) 90'	Stadium: Anfield; Attendance: 38,139; Referee: Nicola Rizzoli (Italy); Assistant referees: Renato Faverani (Italy), Andrea Stefani (Italy); Fourth official: Paolo Mazzoleni (Italy); Goal-line assistants: Luca Banti (Italy), Andrea De Marco (Italy)
Note: Liverpool won 3–1 on aggregate.
