= 2010–11 Lille OSC season =

Lille
2010–11 season
- Chairman: Michel Seydoux
- Manager: Rudi Garcia
- Ground: Stadium Lille Métropole
- Ligue 1: 1st
- Coupe de France: Winners
- Coupe de la Ligue: Quarter-finals
- UEFA Europa League: Round of 32
- Top goalscorer: League: Moussa Sow (25); All: Moussa Sow (26)
Home colours	Away colours	Third colours

The 2010–11 season was Lille's 51st season in the top division of French football, and the 9th year of their current spell.

This season was one of the most important in the club's history, as they won both Ligue 1 and the Coupe de France, titles which they had not conquered since 1954 and 1955, respectively.

== Players ==
Note: Flags indicate national team as defined under FIFA eligibility rules; some limited exceptions apply. Players may hold more than one non-FIFA nationality.

No.	Pos.	Nation	Player
1	GK	FRA	Mickaël Landreau
2	DF	FRA	Mathieu Debuchy
3	DF	GHA	Jerry Vandam
4	MF	FRA	Florent Balmont
5	MF	SEN	Idrissa Gueye
6	DF	SEN	Pape Souaré
7	MF	FRA	Yohan Cabaye
8	FW	SEN	Moussa Sow
9	FW	BRA	Túlio de Melo
10	MF	POL	Ludovic Obraniak
12	FW	FRA	Cédric Baseya
14	DF	CZE	David Rozehnal
15	DF	BRA	Emerson

No.	Pos.	Nation	Player
16	GK	CGO	Barel Mouko
17	FW	FRA	Pierre-Alain Frau
18	DF	FRA	Franck Béria
21	MF	FRA	Arnaud Souquet
22	DF	CMR	Aurélien Chedjou
23	DF	FRA	Adil Rami
24	MF	FRA	Rio Mavuba (captain)
26	MF	BEL	Eden Hazard
27	FW	CIV	Gervinho
28	FW	DEN	Emil Lyng
29	FW	FRA	Stéphane Dumont
30	GK	FRA	Alexandre Oukidja
34	FW	SEN	Omar Wade

=== Transfers in ===
No.	Pos	Player	Transferred from	Fee	Source
8	FW	(Senegal) Moussa Sow	(France) Rennes	Free	
14	DF	(Czech Republic) David Rozehnal	(Germany) Hamburger SV	Loan	
28	FW	(Denmark) Emil Lyng	(Belgium) Zulte Waregem	Loan return	
–	FW	(Republic of the Congo) Cédric Baseya	(France) Le Havre	Loan return	
–	FW	(France) Nicolas Fauvergue	(France) Strasbourg	Loan return	
–	FW	(Slovakia) Róbert Vittek	(Turkey) Ankaragücü	Loan return	

=== Transfers out ===
No.	Pos	Player	Transferred To	Fee	Source
14	FW	(Slovakia) Róbert Vittek	(Turkey) Ankaragücü	€ 3M	
20	FW	(Guinea) Larsen Touré	(France) Brest	€0.2M	
–	FW	(Denmark) Emil Lyng	(Denmark) Nordsjælland	Loan	
1	GK	(France) Ludovic Butelle	(France) Nîmes	Loan	
25	DF	(France) Nicolas Plestan	(Germany) Schalke 04	Free	
8	DF	(Portugal) Ricardo Costa	(Spain) Valencia	Free	
–	FW	(France) Nicolas Fauvergue	(France) Sedan	Loan	
11	FW	(Gabon) Pierre-Emerick Aubameyang	(Italy) Milan	End of loan	

=== Appearances, goals and discipline ===
No.	Pos.	Name	Ligue 1		Coupe de France		Coupe de la Ligue		UEFA Europa League		Total		Discipline	
No.	Pos.	Name	Apps	Goals	Apps	Goals	Apps	Goals	Apps	Goals	Apps	Goals	Yellow card	Red card
1	GK	(France) Mickaël Landreau	38	0	6	0	2	0	9	0	55	0	4	0
16	GK	(Democratic Republic of the Congo) Barel Mouko	0	0	0	0	0	0	1	0	1	0	0	0
2	DF	(France) Mathieu Debuchy	35	2	6	0	2	0	6	0	49	2	13	0
3	DF	(France) Jerry Vandam	2	0	0	0	0	0	4	0	6	0	0	0
6	DF	(Senegal) Pape Souaré	4	0	0	0	0	0	1	0	5	0	0	0
14	DF	(Czech Republic) David Rozehnal	13	1	4	0	2	0	8	0	27	1	5	0
15	DF	(Brazil) Emerson	20	0	2	0	1	0	8	0	31	0	5	0
18	DF	(France) Franck Béria	27	1	5	0	2	0	7	0	41	1	4	0
22	DF	(Cameroon) Aurélien Chedjou	34	1	6	1	1	0	8	2	49	4	8	0
23	DF	(France) Adil Rami	36	0	6	0	2	0	5	0	49	0	7	0
34	DF	(Senegal) Omar Wade	1	0	0	0	0	0	1	0	2	0	0	0
4	MF	(France) Florent Balmont	27	0	5	0	1	0	6	0	39	0	5	0
5	MF	(Senegal) Idrissa Gueye	11	0	1	0	0	0	6	1	18	1	2	0
7	MF	(France) Yohan Cabaye	36	2	5	2	1	0	8	1	50	5	11	0
10	MF	(Poland) Ludovic Obraniak	26	2	6	1	2	0	9	1	44	4	5	0
24	MF	(France) Rio Mavuba	38	1	6	0	2	0	8	0	54	0	7	0
26	MF	(Belgium) Eden Hazard	38	7	5	3	2	2	9	0	54	12	2	0
29	MF	(France) Stéphane Dumont	12	0	2	0	2	0	6	0	21	0	1	0
8	FW	(Senegal) Moussa Sow	36	25	5	0	2	0	8	1	51	26	2	0
9	FW	(Brazil) Túlio de Melo	29	4	6	1	1	0	6	2	42	7	2	0
17	FW	(France) Pierre-Alain Frau	29	5	4	0	1	0	9	4	43	9	3	1
27	FW	(Ivory Coast) Gervinho	35	15	6	2	2	1	7	0	50	18	4	1
28	FW	(Denmark) Emil Lyng	1	0	0	0	0	0	0	0	1	0	0	0

== Club ==
=== Board and staff ===
Position	Staff
Head coach	(France) Rudi Garcia
Assistant Coaches	(France) Claude Fichaux
Assistant Coaches	(France) Frederic Bompard
Goalkeeping coach	(France) Jean‑Pierre Mottet
Physical trainer	(France) Grégory Dupont
Physiotherapist	(France) Marc Cuvilier

Source: losc.fr and Ligue1.com

=== Kits ===
Supplier: umbro
Sponsor(s): Groupe Partouche

Home	Away	Third

Source: newkits.com

== Competitions ==
=== Ligue 1 ===
==== League table ====
Pos	Team	Pld	W	D	L	GF	GA	GD	Pts	Qualification or relegation
1	Lille (C)	38	21	13	4	68	36	+32	76	Qualification to Champions League group stage
2	Marseille	38	18	14	6	62	39	+23	68	Qualification to Champions League group stage
3	Lyon	38	17	13	8	61	40	+21	64	Qualification to Champions League play-off round
4	Paris Saint-Germain	38	15	15	8	56	41	+15	60	Qualification to Europa League play-off round (Note: As 2010–11 Coupe de France winners Lille qualified for the UEFA Champions League and cup runners-up Paris St. Germain were already ensured of a UEFA Europa League spot via league placement, the play-off round berth reserved for the cup winners was awarded to Sochaux, the fifth-placed team.)
5	Sochaux	38	17	7	14	60	43	+17	58	Qualification to Europa League play-off round

Source: Ligue 1
Rules for classification: 1) points; 2) goal difference; 3) number of goals scored.
(C) Champions

==== Results summary ====
Overall								Home						Away					
Pld	W	D	L	GF	GA	GD	Pts	W	D	L	GF	GA	GD	W	D	L	GF	GA	GD
38	21	13	4	68	36	+32	76	13	5	1	40	17	+23	8	8	3	28	19	+9

Last updated: 21 May 2011.
Source: Competitive matches

==== Results by round ====
Round	1	2	3	4	5	6	7	8	9	10	11	12	13	14	15	16	17	18	19	20	21	22	23	24	25	26	27	28	29	30	31	32	33	34	35	36	37	38
Ground	A	H	A	H	A	H	A	H	A	H	A	H	A	H	A	H	A	H	H	A	H	A	H	A	H	A	H	A	H	A	H	A	H	A	A	H	A	H
Result	D	D	D	D	W	W	D	W	L	L	D	W	W	W	D	W	W	W	D	W	W	D	W	L	D	W	W	W	W	L	D	D	W	W	W	W	D	W
Position	9	13	16	11	8	6	7	3	6	8	8	5	2	1	2	1	1	1	1	1	1	1	1	1	1	1	1	1	1	1	1	2	1	1	1	1	1	1

Source: ligue1.com
A = Away; H = Home; W = Win; D = Draw; L = Loss

==== Matches ====
7 August 2010 1	Rennes	1–1	Lille	Rennes
21:00	Bangoura 25'	Report	Sow 62'	Stadium: Stade de la Route de Lorient; Attendance: 21,442; Referee: Sébastien Moreira

15 August 2010 2	Lille	0–0	Paris Saint-Germain	Villeneuve d'Ascq
21:00		Report		Stadium: Stadium Lille Métropole; Attendance: 15,790; Referee: Fredy Fautrel

22 August 2010 3	Sochaux	0–0	Lille	Montbéliard
17:00		Report		Stadium: Stade Bonal; Attendance: 11,436; Referee: Bruno Coué

29 August 2010 4	Lille	1–1	Nice	Villeneuve d'Ascq
17:00	Hazard 67'	Report	Faé 34' (pen.)	Stadium: Stadium Lille Métropole; Attendance: 16,659; Referee: Olivier Thual

11 September 2010 5	Lens	1–4	Lille	Lens
21:00	Boukari 62'	Report	Gervinho 23', 87'; Frau 79', 81'	Stadium: Stade Félix Bollaert; Attendance: 36,811; Referee: Tony Chapron

19 September 2010 6	Lille	1–0	Auxerre	Villeneuve d'Ascq
17:00	Sow 90'	Report		Stadium: Stadium Lille Métropole; Attendance: 14,827; Referee: Ruddy Buquet

26 September 2010 7	Toulouse	1–1	Lille	Toulouse
17:00	Devaux 75'	Report	Gervinho 27'	Stadium: Stadium Municipal; Attendance: 15,101; Referee: Stéphane Bré

3 October 2010 8	Lille	3–1	Montpellier	Villeneuve d'Ascq
17:00	Sow 19', 32'; Gervinho 80'	Report	Giroud 23' (pen.)	Stadium: Stadium Lille Métropole; Attendance: 15,195; Referee: Clément Turpin

17 October 2010 9	Lyon	3–1	Lille	Lyon
21:00	López 3', 56' (pen.); Gourcuff 41'	Report	Sow 52'	Stadium: Stade Gerland; Attendance: 34,976; Referee: Fredy Fautrel

24 October 2010 10	Lille	1–3	Marseille	Villeneuve d'Ascq
21:00	Cabaye 26'	Report	Rémy 53', 80'; González 71'	Stadium: Stadium Lille Métropole; Attendance: 17,305; Referee: Hervé Piccirillo

31 October 2010 11	Valenciennes	1–1	Lille	Valenciennes
21:00	Pujol 88'	Report	Penneteau 86' (o.g.)	Stadium: Stade Nungesser; Attendance: 12,391; Referee: Wilfried Bien

7 November 2010 12	Lille	3–1	Brest	Villeneuve d'Ascq
17:00	Sow 41'; Gervinho 51'; Hazard 76'	Report	Poyet 62'	Stadium: Stadium Lille Métropole; Attendance: 16,225; Referee: Philippe Kalt

13 November 2010 13	Caen	2–5	Lille	Caen
21:00	El Arabi 40'; Traoré 88'	Report	Sow 25', 34', 45+1'; Gervinho 90+1'; Béria 90+3'	Stadium: Stade Michel d'Ornano; Attendance: 14,997; Referee: Bruno Coué

21 November 2010 14	Lille	2–1	Monaco	Villeneuve d'Ascq
17:00	Frau 39'; Obraniak 78'	Report	Adriano 57'	Stadium: Stadium Lille Métropole; Attendance: 16,454; Referee: Stéphane Bré

27 November 2010 15	Bordeaux	1–1	Lille	Bordeaux
21:00	Rami 51' (o.g.)	Report	Sow 35'	Stadium: Stade Chaban-Delmas; Attendance: 26,006; Referee: Hervé Piccirillo

5 December 2010 16	Lille	6–3	Lorient	Villeneuve d'Ascq
15:00	Sow 11', 49', 82'; Baca 18' (o.g.); Gervinho 58'; Frau 88'	Report	Gameiro 7', 45+3'; Kitambala 57'	Stadium: Stadium Lille Métropole; Attendance: 14,239; Referee: Clément Turpin

11 December 2010 17	Arles-Avignon	0–1	Lille	Avignon
19:00		Report	Melo 90+3'	Stadium: Parc des Sports; Attendance: 7,955; Referee: Damien Ledentu

22 December 2010 19	Lille	1–1	Saint-Étienne	Villeneuve d'Ascq
19:00	Sow 72'	Report	Sako 75' (pen.)	Stadium: Stadium Lille Métropole; Attendance: 16,783; Referee: Saïd Ennjimi

15 January 2011 20	Nice	0–2	Lille	Nice
21:00		Report	Gervinho 44'; Sow 50'	Stadium: Stade du Ray; Attendance: 6,975; Referee: Philippe Malige

19 January 2011 18	Lille	3–0	Nancy	Villeneuve d'Ascq
19:00	Gervinho 47', 61'; Hazard 61'	Report		Stadium: Stadium Lille Métropole; Attendance: 16,145; Referee: Alexandre Castro

29 January 2011 21	Lille	1–0	Lens	Villeneuve d'Ascq
21:00	Melo 68'	Report		Stadium: Stadium Lille Métropole; Attendance: 17,451; Referee: Bruno Coué

6 February 2011 22	Auxerre	1–1	Lille	Auxerre
17:00	Dudka 86'	Report	Sow 9'	Stadium: Stade Abbé Deschamps; Attendance: 10,965; Referee: Olivier Thual

13 February 2011 23	Lille	2–0	Toulouse	Villeneuve d'Ascq
21:00	Gervinho 38'; Melo 90+5'	Report		Stadium: Stadium Lille Métropole; Attendance: 15,941; Referee: Wilfried Bien

20 February 2011 24	Montpellier	1–0	Lille	Montpellier
17:00	Belhanda 86'	Report		Stadium: Stade de la Mosson; Attendance: 16,934; Referee: Tony Chapron

27 February 2011 25	Lille	1–1	Lyon	Villeneuve d'Ascq
21:00	Sow 8'	Report	Källström 26'	Stadium: Stadium Lille Métropole; Attendance: 17,166; Referee: Laurent Duhamel

6 March 2011 26	Marseille	1–2	Lille	Marseille
21:00	Rémy 60'	Report	Hazard 10'; Frau 90+1'	Stadium: Stade Vélodrome; Attendance: 52,960; Referee: Johan Hamel

13 March 2011 27	Lille	2–1	Valenciennes	Villeneuve d'Ascq
17:00	Sow 39'; Hazard 90+2'	Report	Pujol 59'	Stadium: Stadium Lille Métropole; Attendance: 17,083; Referee: Lionel Jaffredo

19 March 2011 28	Brest	1–2	Lille	Brest
19:00	Lesoimier 18'	Report	Gervinho 39'; Sow 53'	Stadium: Stade Francis-Le Blé; Attendance: 13,354; Referee: Damien Ledentu

2 April 2011 29	Lille	3–1	Caen	Villeneuve d'Ascq
19:00	Chedjou 30'; Hazard 61'; Sow 73'	Report	El Arabi 85'	Stadium: Stadium Lille Métropole; Attendance: 16,898; Referee: Jean-Charles Cailleux

9 April 2011 30	Monaco	1–0	Lille	Monaco
21:00	Park 12'	Report		Stadium: Stade Louis II; Attendance: 7,986; Referee: Olivier Thual

16 April 2011 31	Lille	1–1	Bordeaux	Villeneuve d'Ascq
21:00	Sow 58'	Report	Savić 76'	Stadium: Stadium Lille Métropole; Attendance: 17,073; Referee: Philippe Kalt

24 April 2011 32	Lorient	1–1	Lille	Lorient
21:00	Gameiro 69'	Report	Debuchy 42'	Stadium: Stade du Moustoir; Attendance: 16,335; Referee: Sebastién Moreira

30 April 2011 33	Lille	5–0	Arles-Avignon	Villeneuve d'Ascq
17:00	Gervinho 6', 45'; Debuchy 49'; Cabaye 84'; Rozehnal 89'	Report		Stadium: Stadium Lille Métropole; Attendance: 16,937; Referee: Nicolas Rainville

7 May 2011 34	Nancy	0–1	Lille	Nancy
19:00		Report	Hazard 45+1'	Stadium: Stade Marcel Picot; Attendance: 18,037; Referee: Alexandre Castro

10 May 2011 35	Saint-Étienne	1–2	Lille	Saint-Étienne
21:00	Rivière 5'	Report	Melo 15'; Mavuba 67'	Stadium: Stade Geoffroy-Guichard; Attendance: 22,176; Referee: Fredy Fautrel

18 May 2011 36	Lille	1–0	Sochaux	Villeneuve d'Ascq
19:00	Gervinho 53'	Report		Stadium: Stadium Lille Métropole; Attendance: 16,813; Referee: Philippe Kalt

21 May 2011 37	Paris Saint-Germain	2–2	Lille	Paris
21:00	Hoarau 45+3'; Bodmer 73'	Report	Obraniak 5'; Sow 59'	Stadium: Parc des Princes; Attendance: 40,404; Referee: Lionel Jaffredo

29 May 2011 38	Lille	3–2	Rennes	Villeneuve d'Ascq
21:00	Sow 36', 61', 76'	Report	Chedjou 26' (o.g.); Montaño 82'	Stadium: Stadium Lille Métropole; Attendance: 17,111; Referee: Ruddy Buquet

=== Coupe de la Ligue ===
27 October 2010 Round of 16	Lille	4–1	Caen	Villeneuve-d'Ascq
18:45	Cabaye 7', 44' (pen.); Gervinho 53'; Hazard 74'	Report	Yatabaré 13'	Stadium: Stadium Lille Métropole; Attendance: 9,685; Referee: Phillipe Malige

10 November 2010 Quarter-finals	Montpellier	2–1	Lille	Stade de la Mosson
18:45	Kabze 28', 52'	Report	Hazard 68'	Stadium: Stadium Lille Métropole; Attendance: 5,764; Referee: Olivier Thual

=== Coupe de France ===
8 January 2011 Round of 64	Forbach	1–3	Lille
17:00	Abdelhak Errai 90+3' (pen.)	Report	Hazard 31'; Chedjou 48'; Gervinho 74'

23 January 2011 Round of 32	Lille	1–0	Wasquehal	Stadium Lille Métropole
17:30	Melo 40'	Report

2 February 2011 Round of 16	Lille	1–1 (a.e.t.) (3–2 p)	Nantes	Stadium Lille Métropole
20:45	Hazard 43'	Report	Đorđević 19'
	Penalties
	Debuchy (penalty scored); Obraniak (penalty scored); Mavuba (penalty scored); Balmont (penalty missed); Sow (penalty missed)		(penalty scored) Déblé; (penalty scored) Nego; (penalty missed) Benzerga; (penalty missed) Sasso; (penalty missed) Rodelin

2 March 2011 Quarter-finals	Lille	0–0 (a.e.t.) (5–3 p)	Lorient	Stadium Lille Métropole
20:45		Report
	Penalties
	Debuchy (penalty scored); Frau (penalty scored); Melo (penalty scored); Obraniak (penalty scored); Hazard (penalty scored)		(penalty scored) Diarra; (penalty scored) Baca; (penalty missed) Mvuemba; (penalty scored) Afalfitano

19 April 2011 Semi-finals	Nice	0–2	Lille	Stade du Ray
20:30		Report	Hazard 44'; Gervinho 46'

14 May 2011 Final	Paris Saint-Germain	0–1	Lille	Stade de France
20:45		Report	Obraniak 89'

=== UEFA Europa League ===
==== Play-off round ====
19 August 2010 First leg	Vaslui (Romania)	0–0	(France) Lille	Vaslui, Romania
19:00		Report		Stadium: Stadionul Municipal; Referee: (Turkey) Bülent Yıldırım

26 August 2010 Second leg	Lille (France)	2–0 (2–0 agg.)	(Romania) Vaslui	Villeneuve-d'Ascq, France
20:45	Cabaye 69' (pen.); Chedjou 80'	Report		Stadium: Stadium Lille Metropole; Referee: (Norway) Tom Harald Hagen

==== Group stage ====
Group C
Team	Pld	W	D	L	GF	GA	GD	Pts
(Portugal) Sporting CP	6	4	0	2	14	6	+8	12
(France) Lille	6	2	2	2	8	6	+2	8
(Belgium) Gent	6	2	1	3	8	13	−5	7
(Bulgaria) Levski Sofia	6	2	1	3	6	11	−5	7

16 September 2010 1	Lille (France)	1–2	(Portugal) Sporting CP	Villeneuve-d'Ascq, France
19:00	Frau 57'	Report	Vukčević 11'; Postiga 34'	Stadium: Stadium Lille Métropole; Attendance: 14,457; Referee: (England) Martin Atkinson

30 September 2010 2	Gent (Belgium)	1–1	(France) Lille	Ghent, Belgium
21:05	De Smet 5'	Report	Frau 21'	Stadium: Jules Ottenstadion; Attendance: 7,834; Referee: (Romania) Alexandru Dan Tudor

21 October 2010 3	Lille (France)	1–0	(Bulgaria) Levski Sofia	Villeneuve-d'Ascq, France
21:05	Chedjou 49'	Report		Stadium: Stadium Lille Métropole; Attendance: 14,646; Referee: (Iceland) Kristinn Jakobsson

4 November 2010 4	Levski Sofia (Bulgaria)	2–2	(France) Lille	Georgi Asparuhov Stadium, Sofia
19:00	Dembélé 11'; Gadzhev 82'	Report	Melo 35'; Ivanov 88' (o.g.)	Attendance: 17,440; Referee: (Serbia) Milorad Mažić

1 December 2010 5	Sporting CP (Portugal)	1–0	(France) Lille	Lisbon, Portugal
21:05	Polga 28'	Report		Stadium: Estádio José Alvalade; Attendance: 16,569; Referee: (Netherlands) Bas Nijhuis

16 December 2010 6	Lille (France)	3–0	(Belgium) Gent	Villeneuve-d'Ascq, France
19:00	Obraniak 30'; Frau 56'; Sow 88'	Report		Stadium: Stadium Lille Métropole; Attendance: 15,285; Referee: (Spain) Carlos Clos Gómez

==== Knockout phase ====
===== Round of 32 =====
17 February 2011 First leg	Lille (France)	2–2	(Netherlands) PSV Eindhoven	Villeneuve-d'Ascq, France
21:05	Gueye 6'; Melo 31'	Report	Bouma 83'; Toivonen 84'	Stadium: Stadium Lille Métropole; Attendance: 16,951; Referee: (Romania) Alexandru Dan Tudor

24 February 2011 Second leg	PSV Eindhoven (Netherlands)	3–1 (5–3 agg.)	(France) Lille	Eindhoven, Netherlands
19:00	Dzsudzsák 55'; Lens 67'; Marcelo 73'	Report	Frau 22'	Stadium: Philips Stadion; Attendance: 28,000; Referee: (Spain) Eduardo Iturralde González
