= 2013–14 Lille OSC season =

Lille
2013–14 season
- President: Michel Seydoux
- Manager: René Girard
- Stadium: Grand Stade Lille Métropole
- Ligue 1: 3rd
- Coupe de France: Quarter-finals
- Coupe de la Ligue: Round of 16
- Top goalscorer: League: Salomon Kalou (16); All: Salomon Kalou (18)
- Highest home attendance: 48,960 vs Paris Saint-Germain (10 May 2014)
- Lowest home attendance: 5,500 vs Caen (11 February 2014)
Home colours	Away colours	Third colours

The 2013–14 season was Lille OSC's seventieth season in existence and the club's fourteenth consecutive season in the top flight of French football. For the first time since the 2008–09 season, the club failed to qualify for any European competition and therefore only participated in domestic competitions (Ligue 1, Coupe de France and Coupe de la Ligue).

For the season, Lille announced René Girard as the replacement to departing manager Rudi Garcia, who joined Italian side Roma.

== Players ==
=== Squad ===
Note: Flags indicate national team as defined under FIFA eligibility rules; some limited exceptions apply. Players may hold more than one non-FIFA nationality.

No.	Pos.	Nation	Player
1	GK	NGR	Vincent Enyeama
4	MF	FRA	Florent Balmont
5	MF	SEN	Idrissa Gueye
6	MF	FRA	Jonathan Delaplace
7	FW	CRC	John Jairo Ruiz
8	FW	CIV	Salomon Kalou
10	MF	FRA	Marvin Martin
11	FW	POR	Ryan Mendes
12	MF	FRA	Souahilo Meïté
13	DF	CIV	Adama Soumaoro
14	DF	DEN	Simon Kjær
15	DF	FRA	Djibril Sidibé

No.	Pos.	Nation	Player
16	GK	FRA	Steeve Elana
18	DF	FRA	Franck Béria
20	FW	FRA	Ronny Rodelin
21	DF	FRA	Julian Jeanvier
22	DF	CZE	David Rozehnal
23	DF	SEN	Pape Souaré
24	MF	FRA	Rio Mavuba (captain)
25	DF	MNE	Marko Baša
26	FW	FRA	Nolan Roux
27	FW	BEL	Divock Origi
30	GK	CGO	Barel Mouko

=== Transfers in ===
P	Nat.	Name	Age	Moving from	Type	Fee	Source
MF	(France)	Jonathan Delaplace	27	Zulte Waregem (Belgium)	Transfer	€1.2M	
DF	(Denmark)	Simon Kjær	24	Wolfsburg (Germany)	Transfer	€2M	
DF	(France)	Julian Jeanvier	21	Nancy	Transfer	€450K	
FW	(France)	Abdoulay Diaby	22	Sedan	Transfer	Free	
MF	(France)	Florian Thauvin	20	Bastia	Loan return	–	
MF	(Belgium)	Viktor Klonaridis	21	Royal Mouscron-Péruwelz (Belgium)	Loan return	–	
MF	(France)	Pape Souaré	23	Reims	Loan return	–	
FW	(Costa Rica)	John Jairo Ruiz	19	Royal Mouscron-Péruwelz (Belgium)	Loan return	–	
MF	(France)	Souahilo Meïté	19	Auxerre	Loan return	–	
FW	(Senegal)	Omar Wade	22	Carquefou	Loan return	–	
GK	(Nigeria)	Vincent Enyeama	30	Maccabi Tel Aviv (Israel)	Loan return	–	
MF	(France)	Arnaud Souquet	21	Royal Mouscron-Péruwelz (Belgium)	Loan return	–	

=== Transfers out ===
P	Nat.	Name	Age	Moving to	Type	Fee	Source
FW	(Senegal)	Omar Wade	23	Diambars (Senegal)	End of contract	Free	
DF	(France)	Laurent Bonnart	33	Ajaccio	End of contract	Free	
DF	(Cameroon)	Aurélien Chedjou	28	Galatasaray (Turkey)	Transfer	€6.3M	
FW	(France)	Dimitri Payet	26	Marseille	Transfer	€10M	
FW	(Brazil)	Túlio de Melo	28	Evian TG	Transfer	undisclosed	
FW	(Belgium)	Gianni Bruno	22	Bastia	Loan	Free	
MF	(France)	Julian Michel	21	Royal Mouscron-Peruwelz (Belgium)	Loan	Free	
DF	(France)	Lucas Digne	20	Paris Saint-Germain	Transfer	€15M	
FW	(France)	Abdoulay Diaby	22	Royal Mouscron-Peruwelz (Belgium)	Loan	Free	
MF	(France)	Benoît Pedretti	32	Ajaccio	End of contract	Free	
MF	(Belgium)	Viktor Klonaridis	21	Panathinaikos (Greece)	Transfer	Free	
FW	(France)	Florian Thauvin	20	Marseille	Transfer	€11.5M	

=== Appearances and goals ===
No.	Pos.	Name	Ligue 1		Coupe de France		Coupe de la Ligue		Total	
No.	Pos.	Name	Apps	Goals	Apps	Goals	Apps	Goals	Apps	Goals
1	GK	(Nigeria) Vincent Enyeama	38	0	0	0	0	0	38	0
16	GK	(France) Steeve Elana	0	0	4	0	1	0	5	0
30	GK	(Republic of the Congo) Barel Mouko	0	0	0	0	0	0	0	0
13	DF	(Ivory Coast) Adama Soumaoro	4	0	2	0	1	0	7	0
14	DF	(Denmark) Simon Kjær	34	0	2	1	0	0	36	1
15	DF	(France) Djibril Sidibé	20	0	3	0	1	0	24	0
18	DF	(France) Franck Béria	26	0	1	0	0	0	27	0
21	DF	(France) Julian Jeanvier	0	0	0	0	0	0	0	0
22	DF	(Czech Republic) David Rozehnal	17	0	4	0	1	0	22	0
23	DF	(Senegal) Pape Souaré	33	3	2	0	1	0	36	3
25	DF	(Montenegro) Marko Baša	32	2	3	0	0	0	35	2
4	MF	(France) Florent Balmont	35	0	2	0	0	0	37	0
5	MF	(Senegal) Idrissa Gueye	37	1	3	0	1	0	41	1
6	MF	(France) Jonathan Delaplace	18	1	4	1	1	0	23	2
10	MF	(France) Marvin Martin	20	0	2	0	0	0	22	0
12	MF	(France) Souahilo Meïté	19	0	3	0	1	0	23	0
24	MF	(France) Rio Mavuba	33	1	2	0	1	0	36	1
7	FW	(Costa Rica) John Jairo Ruiz	8	0	2	0	1	0	11	0
8	FW	(Ivory Coast) Salomon Kalou	38	16	2	2	0	0	40	18
9	FW	(Brazil) Túlio de Melo	5	0	1	1	1	0	7	1
11	FW	(Cape Verde) Ryan Mendes	16	3	3	0	0	0	19	3
20	FW	(France) Ronny Rodelin	30	2	4	2	1	0	35	4
26	FW	(France) Nolan Roux	30	9	2	1	1	0	33	10
27	FW	(Belgium) Divock Origi	29	5	4	1	1	0	34	6
–	DF	(France) Corentin Halucha	0	0	1	0	0	0	0	0

Last updated: 17 May 2014
Source: Match reports in Competitive matches, Ligue1.com

=== Goalscorers ===
Rank.	Name	Ligue 1	Coupe de France	Coupe de la Ligue	Total
1	(Ivory Coast) Kalou	16	2	0	18
2	(France) Roux	9	1	0	10
3	(France) Origi	5	1	0	6
3	(France) Rodelin	2	2	0	4
4	(Senegal) Souaré	3	0	0	3
4	(Montenegro) Baša	3	0	0	3
5	(Cape Verde) Mendes	2	0	0	2
5	(France) Delaplace	1	1	0	2
6	(Senegal) Gueye	1	0	0	1
6	(France) Mavuba	1	0	0	1
6	(Denmark) Kjær	0	1	0	1
6	(Brazil) Melo	0	1	0	1
Own goals		3	0	0	3
Total		46	9	0	55

Last updated: 17 May 2014
Source: Match reports in Competitive matches

== Club ==
=== Coaching staff ===
Position	Staff
Head Coach	René Girard
Assistant Coaches	Nicolas Girard; Claude Fichaux; Jean Pierre Mottet
Goalkeeping Coach	Jean-Pierre Mottet
Physical Trainer	Grégory Dupont

Source: Lille OSC

=== Board ===
Position	Staff
President CEO	Michel Seydoux
Assistant CEO	Frédéric Paquet; Didier de Climmer
Sporting Advisor to the President	Jean-Michel Vandamme

Source: Lille OSC

=== Kit ===
The 2013–14 Kits are produced by Nike and were revealed on 9 July 2013.

Home	Away	Third

== Pre-season and friendlies ==
14 July 2013	Dijon	2–3	Lille	Dijon
19:00	Guerbert 35'; Philippoteaux 42'	Report	Roux 38'; Meïté 52'; Origi 88'	Stadium: Stade Gaston Gérard

20 July 2013	RAEC Mons	1–2	Lille	Mons, Belgium
17:00	Nyoni 42'	Report	Rodelin 11' (pen.); Origi 90'	Stadium: Stade Charles Tondreau

24 July 2013	Lille	2–0	Red Star	Le Touquet
18:00	Baša 19'; Souaré 38'	Report		Stadium: Stade Ferdi Petit

27 July 2013	Lille	1–0	Troyes	Saint-Quentin
19:00	Kalou 23'	Report		Stadium: Stade Paul Debrésie

3 August 2013	Lille	2–0	Paços de Ferreira	Villeneuve-d'Ascq
19:00	Origi 26'; Kalou 67'	Report		Stadium: Stadium Lille Métropole

== Competitions ==
=== Ligue 1 ===
==== League table ====
Pos	Team	Pld	W	D	L	GF	GA	GD	Pts	Qualification or relegation
1	Paris Saint-Germain (C)	38	27	8	3	84	23	+61	89	Qualification for the Champions League group stage (Note: Paris Saint-Germain qualified for the Europa League third qualifying round by winning the 2013–14 Coupe de la Ligue. However, since they already qualified for European competition based on their league position, the spots awarded to the cup winners were passed down the league.)
2	Monaco (Note: Monaco were deducted 2 points due to poor fan behavior in a match last season. However this was overturned on 13 August 2013.)	38	23	11	4	63	31	+32	80	Qualification for the Champions League group stage
3	Lille	38	20	11	7	46	26	+20	71	Qualification for the Champions League third qualifying round
4	Saint-Étienne	38	20	9	9	56	34	+22	69	Qualification for the Europa League play-off round
5	Lyon	38	17	10	11	56	44	+12	61	Qualification for the Europa League third qualifying round

Source: Ligue 1
Rules for classification: 1) Points; 2) Goal difference; 3) Number of goals scored
(C) Champions

==== Results summary ====
Overall								Home						Away					
Pld	W	D	L	GF	GA	GD	Pts	W	D	L	GF	GA	GD	W	D	L	GF	GA	GD
38	20	11	7	46	26	+20	71	13	3	3	25	10	+15	7	8	4	21	16	+5

Last updated: 17 May 2014.
Source: Competitive matches

==== Results by match ====
Round	1	2	3	4	5	6	7	8	9	10	11	12	13	14	15	16	17	18	19	20	21	22	23	24	25	26	27	28	29	30	31	32	33	34	35	36	37	38
Ground	H	A	H	A	H	A	H	A	H	A	A	H	A	H	A	H	A	H	A	H	A	H	A	H	A	H	A	H	H	A	H	A	H	A	H	A	H	A
Result	W	L	W	D	L	W	W	D	W	W	W	W	D	W	W	W	L	W	D	L	L	D	L	W	D	D	W	W	D	D	W	W	W	D	W	D	L	W
Position	7	9	6	8	11	9	4	4	3	3	3	2	2	2	2	2	3	3	3	3	3	3	3	3	3	3	3	3	3	3	3	3	3	3	3	3	3	3

Source: LFP
A = Away; H = Home; W = Win; D = Draw; L = Loss

==== Matches ====
10 August 2013 1	Lille	1–0	Lorient	Villeneuve-d'Ascq
21:00 CET	Origi 13'; Béria (yellow card) 52'	Report	Koné (yellow card) 39'; Gassama (yellow card) 57' (yellow-red card)	Stadium: Stade Pierre-Mauroy; Attendance: 36,362; Referee: Tony Chapron

17 August 2013 2	Reims	2–1	Lille	Reims
20:00 CET	Albaek 7', (yellow card) 57'; Glombard 67'	Report	Baša 88'	Stadium: Stade Auguste-Delaune; Attendance: 14,199; Referee: Mikael Lesage

25 August 2013 3	Lille	1–0	Saint-Étienne	Villeneuve-d'Ascq
14:00 CET	Kalou 37'; Gueye (yellow card) 67'; Enyeama (yellow card) 83'	Report	Hamouma (yellow card) 60'	Stadium: Stade Pierre-Mauroy; Attendance: 35,866; Referee: Clément Turpin

31 August 2013 4	Rennes	0–0	Lille	Rennes
20:00	Boye (yellow card) 45+1'	Report	Kjær (yellow card) 23'; Meïté (yellow card) 75'	Stadium: Stade de la Route de Lorient; Attendance: 20,307; Referee: Nicolas Rainville

14 September 2013 5	Lille	0–2	Nice	Villeneuve-d'Ascq
17:00	Balmont (yellow card) 17'; Béria (yellow card) 26'; Souaré (yellow card) 69'	Report	Cvitanich 20', 45'; Kolodziejczak (yellow card) 35'; Digard (yellow card) 41'; Ospina (yellow card) 69'	Stadium: Stade Pierre-Mauroy; Attendance: 34,002; Referee: Sébastien Desiage

21 September 2013 6	Sochaux	0–2	Lille	Montbéliard
20:00	Carlão (yellow card) 45+1'; Mayuka (yellow card) 60'	Report	Roux 34', 37'; Mavuba (yellow card) 61'	Stadium: Stade Auguste Bonal; Attendance: 10,511; Referee: Benoît Millot

25 September 2013 7	Lille	3–0	Evian	Villeneuve-d'Ascq
19:00	Kalou 13'; Kjær (yellow card) 28'; Hansen 32' (o.g.); Rodelin 72'	Report	Bertoglio (yellow card) 35'; Cambon (yellow card) 60'	Stadium: Stade Pierre-Mauroy; Attendance: 31,252; Referee: Olivier Thual

28 September 2013 8	Lyon	0–0	Lille	Lyon
20:00	Zeffane (yellow card) 20'; Fekir (yellow card) 53'; Lopes (yellow card) 58'	Report	Balmont (yellow card) 4'; Roux (yellow card) 58'	Stadium: Stade de Gerland; Attendance: 39,717; Referee: Bartolomeu Varela

5 October 2013 9	Lille	3–0	Ajaccio	Villeneuve-d'Ascq
20:00	Souaré 17'; Gueye 57', (yellow card) 74'; Kalou 70'	Report	Camara (yellow card) 49'	Stadium: Stade Pierre-Mauroy; Attendance: 34,384; Referee: Stephane Jochem

19 October 2013 10	Montpellier	0–1	Lille	Montpellier
20:00		Report	Souaré 4'; Balmont (yellow card) 26'; Kjær (yellow card) 37'; Béria (yellow card) 84'	Stadium: Stade de la Mosson; Attendance: 13,990; Referee: Benoît Bastien

25 October 2013 11	Nantes	0–1	Lille	Nantes
20:30	Djilobodji (yellow card) 47' (yellow-red card) 83'	Report	Roux 41', (yellow card) 75'; Gueye (yellow card) 43'; Kjær (yellow card) 74'; Souaré (yellow card) 90+6'	Stadium: Stade de la Beaujoire; Attendance: 33,289; Referee: Alexandre Castro

3 November 2013 12	Lille	2–0	Monaco	Villeneuve-d'Ascq
21:00	Sidibé (yellow card) 23'; Roux 27', 71'; Meïté (yellow card) 86'	Report	Moutinho (yellow card) 75'; Falcao (yellow card) 88'	Stadium: Stade Pierre-Mauroy; Attendance: 43,880; Referee: Wilfried Bien

9 November 2013 13	Guingamp	0–0	Lille	Guingamp
20:00	Lévêque (yellow card) 63'; Mathis (yellow card) 72' (yellow-red card) 80'	Report	Béria (yellow card) 79'; Kjær (yellow card) 89'; Roux (yellow card) 90+1'	Stadium: Stade du Roudourou; Attendance: 13,231; Referee: Tony Chapron

24 November 2013 14	Lille	1–0	Toulouse	Villeneuve-d'Ascq
14:00	Mavuba (yellow card) 34'; Souaré 84'	Report	Yago (yellow card) 31'; Trejo (yellow card) 47' (yellow-red card) 56'; Chantôme (yellow card) 58'; Aurier (yellow card) 75'	Stadium: Stade Pierre-Mauroy; Attendance: 38,433; Referee: Philippe Kalt

30 November 2013 15	Valenciennes	0–1	Lille	Valenciennes
20:00	Masuaku (yellow card) 41'; Melikson (yellow card) 80'	Report	Béria (yellow card) 38' (yellow-red card) 52'; Rodelin 46'	Stadium: Stade du Hainaut; Attendance: 14,874; Referee: Bartolomeu Varela

3 December 2013 16	Lille	1–0	Marseille	Villeneuve-d'Ascq
19:00	Roux 90+2'	Report		Stadium: Stade Pierre-Mauroy; Attendance: 46,089; Referee: Laurent Duhamel

8 December 2013 17	Bordeaux	1–0	Lille	Bordeaux
14:00	N'Guémo 27'; Poundjé (red card) 57'	Report	Roux (yellow card) 54'	Stadium: Stade Chaban-Delmas; Attendance: 18,740; Referee: Nicolas Rainville

3 December 2013 18	Lille	2–1	Bastia	Villeneuve-d'Ascq
17:00	Kalou 17', 22'; Baša (yellow card) 27'; Martin (yellow card) 51'; Kjær (yellow card) 87'	Report	Genest 3', (yellow card) 41'	Stadium: Stade Pierre-Mauroy; Attendance: 37,682; Referee: Sébastien Desiage

22 December 2013 19	Paris Saint-Germain	2–2	Lille	Paris
21:00	Ibrahimović 36', (yellow card) 41'Digne (yellow card) 51'; Matuidi (yellow card) 62'; Motta (yellow card) 66'; Baša 72' (o.g.)	Report	Mavuba (yellow card) 41', (goal) 44'; Kalou 53'; Balmont (yellow card) 60'; Roux (yellow card) 65'; Gueye (yellow card) 75'	Stadium: Parc des Princes; Attendance: 45,844; Referee: Fredy Fautrel

12 January 2014 20	Lille	1–2	Reims	Villeneuve-d'Ascq
21:00	Weber 88' (o.g.); Kjær (yellow card) 90'	Report	Fortes 73'; Krychowiak 76' de Preville (yellow card) 89'	Stadium: Stade Pierre-Mauroy; Attendance: 36,287; Referee: Alexandre Castro

17 January 2014 21	Saint-Etienne	2–0	Lille	Saint-Etienne
20:30	Sall (yellow card) 53'; Brandão 55'; Tabanou 61'	Report	Balmont (red card) 62'; Souaré (yellow card) 89'	Stadium: Stade Geoffroy-Guichard; Attendance: 26,887; Referee: Benoît Bastien

24 January 2014 22	Lille	1–1	Rennes	Villeneuve-d'Ascq
20:30	Kalou 34'; Sidibé (yellow card) 67'	Report	Doucouré 41'	Stadium: Stade Pierre-Mauroy; Attendance: 35,706; Referee: Ruddy Buquet

2 February 2014 23	Nice	1–0	Lille	Nice
14:00	Bodmer 45+2'; Pejčinović (yellow card) 63'	Report	Kjær (yellow card) 90+3'	Stadium: Allianz Riviera; Attendance: 21,953; Referee: Wilfried Bien

8 February 2014 24	Lille	2–0	Sochaux	Villeneuve-d'Ascq
20:00	Origi 3'; Mendes 90+3'	Report	J. Ayew (yellow card) 33'; Roudet (yellow card) 45+1'	Stadium: Stade Pierre-Mauroy; Attendance: 34,841; Referee: Stéphane Jochem

16 February 2014 25	Evian	2–2	Lille	Annecy
17:00	Bérigaud 15'; Koné (yellow card) 27'; Mongongu 64'; Ruben (yellow card) 79'; Angoula (yellow card) 89'	Report	Souaré (yellow card) 19'; Origi 23'; Mendes 90+3'	Stadium: Parc des Sports; Attendance: 9,369; Referee: Laurent Duhamel

23 February 2014 26	Lille	0–0	Lyon	Villeneuve-d'Ascq
21:00	Roux (yellow card) 30'; Sidibé (yellow card) 38'; Balmont (yellow card) 89'	Report	Gomis (yellow card) 39'	Stadium: Stade Pierre-Mauroy; Attendance: 43,518; Referee: Benoît Millot

2 March 2014 27	Ajaccio	2–3	Lille	Ajaccio
14:00	Tallo 2', 42', (yellow card) 72'; Cavalli (yellow card) 24'; Hengbart (yellow card) 74'	Report	Kalou 26', 38', 74'; Gueye (yellow card) 45+1'; Origi (yellow card) 67'; Soumaoro (red card) 81'	Stadium: Stade François Coty; Attendance: 5,663; Referee: Olivier Thual

9 March 2014 28	Lille	2–0	Montpellier	Villeneuve-d'Ascq
14:00	Baša 18'; Gueye (yellow card) 24'; Delaplace (yellow card) 26'; Roux 57'	Report	Marveaux (yellow card) 48'	Stadium: Stade Pierre-Mauroy; Attendance: 40,264; Referee: Amaury Delerue

15 March 2014 29	Lille	0–0	Nantes	Villeneuve-d'Ascq
16:30		Report	Touré (yellow card) 30'; Nicoliță (yellow card) 60'; Gakpé (yellow card) 90'	Stadium: Stade Pierre-Mauroy; Attendance: 39,328; Referee: Philippe Kalt

23 March 2014 30	Monaco	1–1	Lille	Monaco
21:00	Obbadi 4'; Echiéjilé (yellow card) 16'	Report	Kjær (yellow card) 34'; Origi 38'; Balmont (yellow card) 68'	Stadium: Stade Louis II; Attendance: 7,157; Referee: Nicolas Rainville

30 March 2014 31	Lille	1–0	Guingamp	Villeneuve-d'Ascq
17:00	Martin (yellow card) 42'; Kalou 90+2'	Report	Martins (yellow card) 19'; Mandanne (yellow card) 47'; Sorbon (yellow card) 68'; Diallo (yellow card) 89'	Stadium: Stade Pierre-Mauroy; Attendance: 39,319; Referee: Wilfried Bien

5 April 2014 32	Toulouse	1–2	Lille	Toulouse
20:00	Yago (yellow card) 16'; Aguilar (yellow card) 65'; Aurier 90+3'	Report	Balmont (yellow card) 5'; Roux 26'; Béria (yellow card) 31' (yellow-red card) 68'; Kalou 42'; Souaré (yellow card) 36' (yellow-red card) 70'	Stadium: Stadium Municipal; Attendance: 14,107; Referee: Fredy Fautrel

12 April 2014 33	Lille	1–0	Valenciennes	Villeneuve-d'Ascq
17:00	Origi 70'	Report	Mater (yellow card) 11'; Ducourtioux (yellow card) 12'; Yamissi (yellow card) 78'	Stadium: Stade Pierre-Mauroy; Attendance: 37,757; Referee: Saïd Ennjimi

20 April 2014 34	Marseille	0–0	Lille	Marseille
21:00	Mendes (yellow card) 50'	Report		Stadium: Stade Vélodrome; Attendance: 39,545; Referee: Tony Chapron

27 April 2014 35	Lille	2–1	Bordeaux	Villeneuve-d'Ascq
21:00	Kalou 23'; Souaré (yellow card) 49'; Mendes 68'; Baša (yellow card) 83'	Report	Diabaté (yellow card) 34'; Jussiê 71'	Stadium: Stade Pierre-Mauroy; Attendance: 40,644; Referee: Clément Turpin

2 May 2014 36	Bastia	1–1	Lille	Bastia
20:30	Khazri (yellow card) 41', (goal) 85'	Report	Kalou 32'; Souaré (yellow card) 73'	Stadium: Stade Armand Cesari; Attendance: 12,702; Referee: Laurent Duhamel

10 May 2014 37	Lille	1–3	Paris Saint-Germain	Villeneuve-d'Ascq
21:00	Martin (red card) 37'; Mavuba (yellow card) 90'; Delaplace 90'	Report	Rabiot (yellow card) 4'; Marquinhos 41', (yellow card) 61'; Digne (yellow card) 58'; Lucas 65'; Matuidi 82'; Ibrahimović (yellow card) 90+1'	Stadium: Stade Pierre-Mauroy; Attendance: 48,960; Referee: Ruddy Buquet

17 May 2014 38	Lorient	1–4	Lille	Lorient
21:00	Kalou 32', 65', (yellow card) 45+1'; Roux 52'; Bourillon 90+2' (o.g.)	Report	Manga (yellow card) 4'; Aliadière 22'; Audard (yellow card) 38'	Stadium: Stade du Moustoir; Attendance: 16,593; Referee: Nicolas Rainville

=== Coupe de France ===
5 January 2014 Round of 64	Amiens	1–3	Lille	Amiens
	Benaries 6'; Sankare (yellow card) 22'; Matondo (yellow card) 90'	Report	Souaré (yellow card) 8'; Kalou 23', 57'; Rodelin 66'; Rozehnal (yellow card) 70'	Stadium: Stade de la Licorne; Attendance: 2,689; Referee: Benoît Millot

21 January 2014 Round of 32	Iris Club de Croix	0–3	Lille	Villeneuve-d'Ascq
19:30	Elouaari (yellow card) 32'; Obino (yellow card) 60'	Report	Kjær 17'; Melo 57', (yellow card) 64'; Ruiz (yellow card) 74'; Origi 89'	Stadium: Stadium Nord Lille Métropole; Attendance: 5,892; Referee: Mikael Lesage

11 February 2014 Round of 16	Lille	3–3 (a.e.t.) (6–5 p)	Caen	Villeneuve-d'Ascq
20:45	Rodelin 33'; Delaplace 77'; Roux 82'	Report	Koita 14', 28'; Rodelin 90+3' (o.g.)	Stadium: Stade Pierre-Mauroy; Attendance: 5,500; Referee: Lionel Jaffredo
	Penalties
	Baša (penalty scored); Balmont (penalty scored); Origi (penalty scored); Rodelin (penalty scored); Sidibé (penalty scored); Rozehnal (penalty scored)		(penalty scored) Felipe Saad; (penalty scored) Duhamel; (penalty scored) Calvé; (penalty scored) Appiah; (penalty scored) Kodjia; (penalty missed) Autret

27 March 2014 Quarter-final	Rennes	2–0	Lille	Rennes
	Grosicki 34'; Alessandrini 90'	Report		Stadium: Stade de la Route de Lorient; Attendance: 27,849; Referee: Laurent Duhamel

=== Coupe de la Ligue ===
29 October 2013 Round of 32	Lille	0–1 (a.e.t.)	Auxerre	Villeneuve-d'Ascq
20:00		Report	Segbefia (yellow card) 41'; Ntep (yellow card) 61'; Ben Idir (yellow card) 76'; Haller 113'; Ngando (yellow card) 118'	Stadium: Stade Pierre-Mauroy; Attendance: 15,868; Referee: Benoît Millot
