= 2014–15 Lille OSC season =

Lille
2014–15 season
- President: Michel Seydoux
- Manager: René Girard
- Stadium: Stade Pierre-Mauroy
- Ligue 1: 8th
- Coupe de France: Round of 64
- Coupe de la Ligue: Semi-finals
- UEFA Champions League: Play-off round
- UEFA Europa League: Group stage
- Top goalscorer: League: Nolan Roux (9); All: Nolan Roux (10)
- Highest home attendance: 45,771 vs Paris Saint-Germain (3 December 2014)
- Lowest home attendance: 10,035 vs Bordeaux (17 December 2014)
Home colours	Away colours	Third colours

The 2014–15 season was Lille OSC's 71st season in existence and the club's 15th consecutive season in the top flight of French football.

After a season without any European competition, the club, which finished third in last season, participated in the UEFA Champions League, starting in the third qualifying round, before being eliminated by Porto in the play-off round. As the club were eliminated, they earned a place in the UEFA Europa League group stage. In addition to the European competition, LOSC participated in domestic competitions (Ligue 1, Coupe de France and Coupe de la Ligue).

== Players ==
=== Squad ===
Note: Flags indicate national team as defined under FIFA eligibility rules; some limited exceptions apply. Players may hold more than one non-FIFA nationality.

No.	Pos.	Nation	Player
1	GK	NGR	Vincent Enyeama
2	DF	FRA	Sébastien Corchia
4	MF	FRA	Florent Balmont
5	MF	SEN	Idrissa Gueye
6	MF	FRA	Jonathan Delaplace
7	MF	FRA	Sofiane Boufal
9	FW	FRA	Ronny Rodelin
10	MF	FRA	Marvin Martin
11	FW	SUI	Michael Frey
12	MF	FRA	Souahilo Meïté
13	DF	FRA	Adama Soumaoro
14	DF	DEN	Simon Kjær
15	DF	FRA	Djibril Sidibé
16	GK	FRA	Steeve Elana

No.	Pos.	Nation	Player
17	MF	POR	Marcos Lopes (on loan from Manchester City)
18	DF	FRA	Franck Béria
20	FW	POR	Ryan Mendes
22	DF	CZE	David Rozehnal
23	DF	SEN	Pape Souaré
24	MF	FRA	Rio Mavuba (captain)
25	DF	MNE	Marko Baša
26	FW	FRA	Nolan Roux
27	FW	BEL	Divock Origi (on loan from Liverpool)
30	GK	FRA	Jean Butez
33	MF	MLI	Adama Traoré
34	MF	FRA	Benjamin Pavard
35	FW	CGO	Kévin Koubemba
—	DF	FRA	Corentin Halucha

=== Transfers in ===
P	Nat.	Name	Age	Moving from	Type	Fee	Source
DF	(France)	Sébastien Corchia	23	Sochaux	Transfer	€1,8M	
MF	(Belgium)	Divock Origi	19	Liverpool (England)	Loan	Free	
FW	(Switzerland)	Michael Frey	20	Young Boys (Switzerland)	Transfer	€3m	
MF	(France)	Sofiane Boufal	20	Angers (France)	Transfer	Free	

=== Transfers out ===
P	Nat.	Name	Age	Moving to	Type	Fee	Source
GK	(Republic of the Congo)	Barel Mouko	35	—	Retired		
GK	(France)	Alexandre Oukidja	25	Free agent	Contract terminated		
DF	(France)	Julian Jeanvier	25	Mouscron-Peruwelz (Belgium)	Loan	Free	
MF	(France)	Julian Michel	22	Free agent	Contract terminated	Free	
FW	(Belgium)	Divock Origi	19	Liverpool (England)	Transfer	€12m	
FW	(Belgium)	Gianni Bruno	22	Evian	Transfer	Free	
FW	(Costa Rica)	John Jairo Ruiz	20	Oostende (Belgium)	Loan	Free	
FW	(France)	Ronny Rodelin	20	Mouscron-Peruwelz (Belgium)	Loan	Free	
FW	(Ivory Coast)	Salomon Kalou	29	Hertha BSC (Germany)	Transfer	€3M	
DF	(Senegal)	Pape Souaré	24	Crystal Palace (England)	Transfer	Undisclosed	
FW	(United States)	Maki Tall	19	Red Star (France)	Loan		

== Statistics ==
=== Appearances and goals ===
No.	Pos.	Name	Ligue 1		UEFA Champions League		UEFA Europa League		Coupe de France		Coupe de la Ligue		Total	
No.	Pos.	Name	Apps	Goals	Apps	Goals	Apps	Goals	Apps	Goals	Apps	Goals	Apps	Goals
1	GK	(Nigeria) Vincent Enyeama	38	0	3	0	6	0	0	0	3	0	50	0
2	DF	(France) Sébastien Corchia	31	1	4	1	6	0	1	0	3	1	45	3
4	MF	(France) Florent Balmont	30	1	4	1	6	0	1	0	3	0	44	2
5	MF	(Senegal) Idrissa Gueye	32	4	4	0	6	0	0	0	2	0	44	4
6	MF	(France) Jonathan Delaplace	21	2	3	0	2	0	0	0	1	0	27	2
7	MF	(Morocco) Sofiane Boufal	14	3	0	0	0	0	0	0	2	0	16	3
8	MF	(Mali) Adama Traoré	20	2	0	0	0	0	1	0	3	0	24	2
8	FW	(Ivory Coast) Salomon Kalou	1	0	2	0	0	0	0	0	0	0	3	0
9	FW	(France) Ronny Rodelin	15	0	2	0	5	0	0	0	1	0	23	0
10	MF	(France) Marvin Martin	6	0	0	0	2	0	0	0	0	0	8	0
11	FW	(Switzerland) Michael Frey	15	2	0	0	3	0	1	0	2	1	21	3
12	MF	(France) Souahilo Meïté	8	0	2	0	1	0	1	0	2	0	14	0
13	DF	(Ivory Coast) Adama Soumaoro	1	0	0	0	0	0	0	0	0	0	1	0
14	DF	(Denmark) Simon Kjær	31	1	4	0	5	1	0	0	2	1	42	3
15	DF	(France) Djibril Sidibé	25	2	1	0	2	0	1	0	3	0	32	2
16	GK	(France) Steeve Elana	0	0	1	0	0	0	1	0	0	0	2	0
17	MF	(Portugal) Rony Lopes	23	3	2	0	1	0	0	0	1	0	27	3
18	DF	(France) Franck Béria	17	0	4	0	4	0	0	0	0	0	25	0
20	FW	(Cape Verde) Ryan Mendes	19	2	4	1	6	0	0	0	2	0	31	3
22	DF	(Czech Republic) David Rozehnal	18	0	1	0	2	0	1	0	1	0	23	0
23	DF	(Senegal) Pape Souaré	11	0	4	0	5	0	0	0	1	0	21	0
24	MF	(France) Rio Mavuba	30	1	2	0	4	0	1	0	2	0	39	1
25	DF	(Montenegro) Marko Baša	30	1	3	0	6	0	1	0	3	0	43	1
26	FW	(France) Nolan Roux	33	9	3	0	5	1	1	0	2	0	44	10
27	FW	(Belgium) Divock Origi	33	8	3	0	5	1	1	0	2	0	44	9
33	DF	(France) Benjamin Pavard	8	0	0	0	0	0	0	0	0	0	8	0
35	FW	(Republic of the Congo) Kevin Koubemba	8	0	0	0	0	0	0	0	2	0	10	0
40	GK	(France) Jean Butez	0	0	0	0	0	0	0	0	0	0	0	0
—	DF	(Mali) Youssouf Koné	0	0	0	0	0	0	1	0	0	0	1	0

Last updated: 23 May 2015
Source: Match reports in Competitive matches, Ligue1.com

=== Goalscorers ===
Rank.	Name	Ligue 1	UEFA Champions League	UEFA Europa League	Coupe de France	Coupe de la Ligue	Total
1	(France) Nolan Roux	9	0	1	0	0	10
2	(Belgium) Divock Origi	8	0	1	0	0	9
3	(Senegal) Idrissa Gueye	4	0	0	0	0	4
4	(France) Sébastien Corchia	1	1	0	0	1	3
4	(France) Sofiane Boufal	3	0	0	0	0	3
4	(Portugal) Rony Lopes	3	0	0	0	0	3
4	(Switzerland) Michael Frey	2	0	0	0	1	3
4	(Cape Verde) Ryan Mendes	2	1	0	0	0	3
4	(Denmark) Simon Kjær	1	0	1	0	1	3
5	(France) Florent Balmont	1	1	0	0	0	2
5	(France) Jonathan Delaplace	2	0	0	0	0	2
5	(France) Djibril Sidibé	2	0	0	0	0	2
5	(Mali) Adama Traoré	2	0	0	0	0	2
6	(France) Rio Mavuba	1	0	0	0	0	1
6	(Montenegro) Marko Baša	1	0	0	0	0	1
Own goals		1	0	0	0	0	1
Total		43	3	3	0	3	52

Last updated: 23 May 2015
Source: Match reports in Competitive matches, ESPN

=== Disciplinary record ===
N	Pos.	Nat.	Name	Yellow card	Second yellow card	Red card	Notes
1	GK	(Nigeria)	Vincent Enyeama	2			
2	DF	(France)	Sébastien Corchia	6	1	1	
4	MF	(France)	Florent Balmont	13			
5	MF	(Senegal)	Idrissa Gueye	6			
6	MF	(France)	Jonathan Delaplace	2			
7	MF	(France)	Sofiane Boufal	1			
8	MF	(Mali)	Adama Traoré	3			
9	FW	(France)	Ronny Rodelin	1			
10	MF	(France)	Marvin Martin	1			
11	FW	(Switzerland)	Michael Frey	2			
12	MF	(France)	Soualiho Meïté	1			
14	DF	(Denmark)	Simon Kjær	6			
15	DF	(France)	Djibril Sidibé	7		1	
17	MF	(Portugal)	Marcos Lopes	4		1	
18	DF	(France)	Franck Béria	4			
20	MF	(Cape Verde)	Ryan Mendes	1			
23	DF	(Senegal)	Pape Souaré	2			
24	MF	(France)	Rio Mavuba	6			
25	DF	(Montenegro)	Marko Baša	6			
26	FW	(France)	Nolan Roux	4			
33	MF	(France)	Benjamin Pavard	2			
35	FW	(Republic of the Congo)	Kevin Koubemba	1			

Last updated: 23 May 2015
Source: Match reports in Competitive matches, ESPN
Only competitive matches
(yellow card) = Number of bookings; (second yellow card) = Number of sending offs after a second yellow card; (red card) = Number of sending offs by a direct red card.

== Pre-season and friendlies ==
12 July 2014 Friendly	Lille	0–1	Vysočina Jihlava	Salzburg, Austria
18:00			Mešanović 80'	Stadium: Stadium Rif

16 July 2014 Friendly	Lille	1–2	Kortrijk	Calais, France
19:00	Rodelin 5'		Matton 69'; Marušić 72'	Stadium: Stade de l'Épopée; Attendance: 4,000

19 July 2014 Friendly	Lille	0–1	Zenit Saint Petersburg	Bischofshofen, Austria
19:00			Danny 79' (pen.)	Stadium: Bischofshofen Sportplatz

23 July 2014 Friendly	Lille	2–0	Maccabi Haifa	Bischofshofen, Austria
19:00	Ryan Mendes 16'; Kjær 53'			Stadium: Bischofshofen Sportplatz

== Competitions ==
=== Ligue 1 ===
==== League table ====
Pos	Team	Pld	W	D	L	GF	GA	GD	Pts	Qualification or relegation
6	Bordeaux	38	17	12	9	47	44	+3	63	Qualification for the Europa League third qualifying round (Note: Since winners of the 2014–15 Coupe de la Ligue, Paris Saint-Germain, qualified for European competition based on their league position, the spot awarded to the Coupe de la Ligue winner (Europa League third qualifying round) is passed to the next best team in the table not already qualified for any European competition (in this case, the fifth-placed team).)
7	Montpellier	38	16	8	14	46	39	+7	56	
8	Lille	38	16	8	14	43	42	+1	56	
9	Rennes	38	13	11	14	35	42	−7	50	
10	Guingamp	38	15	4	19	41	55	−14	49	

Source: Ligue 1
Rules for classification: 1) points; 2) goal difference; 3) number of goals scored

==== Results summary ====
Overall								Home						Away					
Pld	W	D	L	GF	GA	GD	Pts	W	D	L	GF	GA	GD	W	D	L	GF	GA	GD
38	16	8	14	43	42	+1	56	11	5	3	26	12	+14	5	3	11	17	30	−13

Last updated: 10 June 2015.
Source: Competitive matches

==== Results by round ====
Round	1	2	3	4	5	6	7	8	9	10	11	12	13	14	15	16	17	18	19	20	21	22	23	24	25	26	27	28	29	30	31	32	33	34	35	36	37	38
Ground	H	A	H	A	H	H	A	H	A	H	A	H	A	H	A	H	A	H	A	H	A	H	A	A	H	A	H	A	H	A	H	A	H	A	H	A	H	A
Result	D	W	W	D	W	D	L	W	L	L	L	D	L	W	L	D	D	W	L	W	L	L	D	W	D	L	W	W	W	L	W	W	W	L	W	L	L	W
Position	12	7	3	3	1	4	5	3	4	8	11	12	14	10 (Note: Match 14 was postponed and played at the later date of 7 January 2015. It should be placed between matches 19 & 20.)	15	13	13	13	13	11	12	13	13	11	11	12	9	8	8	8	8	8	8	8	8	8	8	8

Source: LFP
A = Away; H = Home; W = Win; D = Draw; L = Loss

==== Matches ====
9 August 2014 1	Lille	0–0	Metz	Villeneuve-d'Ascq
21:00 CEST (UTC+02:00)		Report	N'Daw (yellow card) 37'	Stadium: Stade Pierre-Mauroy; Attendance: 34,327; Referee: Fredy Fautrel

15 August 2014 2	Caen	0–1	Lille	Le Mans
20:30 CEST	Kanté (yellow card) 3'; Appiah (red card) 67'; Adeoti (yellow card) 75'	Report	Balmont (yellow card) 2'; Origi 69' (pen.); Lopes (yellow card) 73'	Stadium: MMArena; Attendance: 12,664; Referee: Sébastien Desiage

23 August 2014 3	Lille	2–0	Lorient	Villeneuve-d'Ascq
20:00 CEST	Delaplace 58'; Kjær 74'	Report	Abdullah (yellow card) 29'	Stadium: Stade Pierre-Mauroy; Attendance: 34,860; Referee: Tony Chapron

30 August 2014 4	Monaco	1–1	Lille	Monaco
17:00 CEST	Raggi (yellow card) 60'; Berbatov 61'	Report	Roux 18', (yellow card) 42'; Enyeama (yellow card) 40'; Souaré (yellow card) 53'	Stadium: Stade Louis II; Attendance: 9,345; Referee: Saïd Ennjimi

14 September 2014 5	Lille	2–0	Nantes	Villeneuve-d'Ascq
14:00 CEST	Martin (yellow card) 34'; Origi 46'; Lopes 49'; Sidibé (yellow card) 90'	Report	Veigneau (yellow card) 72'	Stadium: Stade Pierre-Mauroy; Attendance: 32,560; Referee: Lionel Jaffredo

21 September 2014 6	Lille	0–0	Montpellier	Villeneuve-d'Ascq
14:00 CEST		Report		Stadium: Stade Pierre-Mauroy; Attendance: 31,742; Referee: Olivier Thual

24 September 2014 7	Nice	1–0	Lille	Nice
19:00 CEST	Bodmer 41'; Bauthéac (yellow card) 67'	Report	Kjær (yellow card) 72'	Stadium: Allianz Riviera; Attendance: 16,541; Referee: Benoît Millot

27 September 2014 8	Lille	1–0	Bastia	Villeneuve-d'Ascq
20:00 CEST (UTC+02:00)	Béria (yellow card) 2'; Origi 39'; Souaré (yellow card) 50'; Traoré (yellow card) 90+3'	Report	Gillet (yellow card) 31'; Ongenda (yellow card) 70'; Pino (yellow card) 83'	Stadium: Stade Pierre-Mauroy; Attendance: 33,558; Referee: Bartolomeu Varela

5 October 2014 9	Lyon	3–0	Lille	Lyon
17:00 CEST (UTC+02:00)	Gonalons (yellow card) 14'; Lacazette 39', 45', 84'	Report	Traoré (yellow card) 23'; Béria (yellow card) 27'; Baša (yellow card) 44'; Balmont (yellow card) 54'	Stadium: Stade Gerland; Attendance: 34,349; Referee: Clément Turpin

18 October 2014 10	Lille	1–2	Guingamp	Villeneuve-d'Ascq
20:00 CEST (UTC+02:00)	Balmont (yellow card) 13'; Corchia (yellow card) 21'; Mavuba 78'; Sidibé (yellow card) 89'	Summary	Sankharé (yellow card) 15'; Beauvue 45+1'; Schwartz 57', (yellow card) 61'; Angoua (red card) 86'	Stadium: Stade Pierre-Mauroy; Attendance: 33,926; Referee: Fredy Fautrel

26 October 2014 11	Rennes	2–0	Lille	Rennes
14:00 CET (UTC+01:00)	Habibou 46'; Doucouré 54'; André (yellow card) 81'	Report	Sidibé (yellow card) 65'; Balmont (yellow card) 78'	Stadium: Route de Lorient; Attendance: 17,392; Referee: Philippe Kalt

1 November 2014 12	Lille	1–1	Saint-Étienne	Villeneuve-d'Ascq
20:00 CET (UTC+01:00)	Frey 16', (yellow card) 83'; Souaré (yellow card) 76'; Origi (penalty missed) 72'	Summary	Sall (yellow card) 36'; Diomandé (yellow card) 42'; Gradel 60', (penalty missed) 85'	Stadium: Stade Pierre-Mauroy; Attendance: 36,170; Referee: Benoît Bastien

9 November 2014 13	Reims	2–0	Lille	Reims
17:00 CET (UTC+01:00)	Moukandjo 26' (pen.); Mandi 33'; Charbonnier (yellow card) 56' de Préville (yellow card) 65'	Report	Béria (yellow card) 7'; Corchia (red card) 24'; Souaré (yellow card) 61'; Mavuba (yellow card) 88'	Stadium: Stade Auguste Delaune; Attendance: 13,004; Referee: Alexandre Castro

30 November 2014 15	Bordeaux	1–0	Lille	Bordeaux
14:00 CET (UTC+01:00)	Diabaté 62'	Report	Sidibé (yellow card) 54'	Stadium: Stade Chaban-Delmas; Attendance: 19,361; Referee: Nicolas Rainville

3 December 2014 16	Lille	1–1	Paris Saint-Germain	Villeneuve-d'Ascq
21:00 CET (UTC+01:00)	Sirigu 42' (o.g.)	Report	Cavani 29'; Motta (yellow card) 58'	Stadium: Stade Pierre-Mauroy; Attendance: 45,771; Referee: Lionel Jaffredo

7 December 2014 17	Lens	1–1	Lille	Paris
11:00 CET (UTC+01:00)	Kantari (yellow card) 55'; Valdivia (yellow card) 89'; Coulibaly 90+1', (yellow card) 90+2'; Cavaré (yellow card) 90+4'	Report	Gueye 47', (yellow card) 86'	Stadium: Stade de France; Attendance: 40,112; Referee: Ruddy Buquet

14 December 2014 18	Lille	3–0	Toulouse	Villeneuve-d'Ascq
17:00 CET (UTC+01:00)	Sidibé 7'; Mendes 50'; Baša (yellow card) 57'; Roux (yellow card) 70', (goal) 77'; Souaré (yellow card) 72'	Report	Spano (red card) 1'; Akpa Akpro (yellow card) 27'; Tisserand (yellow card) 89'	Stadium: Stade Pierre-Mauroy; Attendance: 37,938; Referee: Fredy Fautrel

21 December 2014 19	Marseille	2–1	Lille	Marseille
14:00 CET (UTC+01:00)	Roux 32' (o.g.); Batshuayi 69'; Romao (yellow card) 76'	Report	Gueye 61'; Frey (yellow card) 63'	Stadium: Stade Vélodrome; Attendance: 62,408; Referee: Alexandre Castro

7 January 2015 14	Lille	1–0	Evian	Villeneuve-d'Ascq
21:30 CET (UTC+01:00)	Traoré 61'	Report	Cambon (yellow card) 68'	Stadium: Stade Pierre-Mauroy; Attendance: 32,580; Referee: Nicolas Rainville

10 January 2015 20	Lille	1–0	Caen	Villeneuve-d'Ascq
20:00 CET (UTC+01:00)	Frey 20'; Kjær (yellow card) 36'	Report	Féret (yellow card) 59'	Stadium: Stade Pierre-Mauroy; Attendance: 34,334; Referee: Olivier Thual

17 January 2015 21	Lorient	1–0	Lille	Lorient
20:00 CET (UTC+01:00)	Pedrinho (yellow card) 38'; Guerreiro 59'; Mostefa (yellow card) 84'	Report	Koubemba (yellow card) 43'	Stadium: Stade du Moustoir; Attendance: 12,026; Referee: Phillippe Kalt

24 January 2015 22	Lille	0–1	Monaco	Villeneuve-d'Ascq
17:00 CET (UTC+01:00)	Delaplace (yellow card) 52'; Lopes (yellow card) 58'	Report	Berbatov 57'; Carrasco (yellow card) 72'; Toulalan (yellow card) 76'	Stadium: Stade Pierre-Mauroy; Attendance: 34,898; Referee: Fredy Fautrel

31 January 2015 23	Nantes	1–1	Lille	Nantes
20:00 CET (UTC+01:00)	Veretout (yellow card) 59'; Vizcarrondo 80'	Report	Delaplace 14'; Pavard (yellow card) 56'	Stadium: Stade de la Beaujoire; Attendance: 19,252; Referee: Wilfried Bien

7 February 2015 24	Montpellier	1–2	Lille	Montpellier
20:00 CET (UTC+01:00)	Dabo 90+2'	Report	Roux 9'; Mavuba (yellow card) 31'; Lopes 53'	Stadium: Stade de la Mosson; Attendance: 10,365; Referee: Sébastien Moreira

14 February 2015 25	Lille	0–0	Nice	Villeneuve-d'Ascq
20:00 CET (UTC+01:00)	Lopes (yellow card) 35'; Sidibé (red card) 42'; Balmont (yellow card) 44'; Mavuba (yellow card) 45+1'	Report	Genevois (yellow card) 42'; Pléa (yellow card) 69'; Bauthéac (yellow card) 70'	Stadium: Stade Pierre-Mauroy; Attendance: 35,053; Referee: Bartolomeu Varela

21 February 2015 26	Bastia	2–1	Lille	Bastia
20:00 CET (UTC+01:00)	Sio 22'; Ayité 40'	Report	Mendes 17'; Corchia (yellow card) 63'	Stadium: Stade Armand Cesari; Attendance: 11,621; Referee: Sébastien Desiage

28 February 2015 27	Lille	2–1	Lyon	Villeneuve-d'Ascq
16:00 CET (UTC+01:00)	Lopes (yellow card) 51', (goal) 60'; Gueye 56'; Delaplace (yellow card) 80'	Report	Tolisso 2'; Bedimo (yellow card) 63'; Lacazette (yellow card) 78'	Stadium: Stade Pierre-Mauroy; Attendance: 40,080; Referee: Lionel Jaffredo

8 March 2015 28	Guingamp	0–1	Lille	Guingamp
17:00 CET (UTC+01:00)	Pied (yellow card) 62'; Yatabaré (yellow card) 66'	Report	Roux 51'; Gueye (yellow card) 68'; Enyeama (yellow card) 88'; Sidibé (yellow card) 89'	Stadium: Stade du Roudourou; Attendance: 13,639; Referee: Benoît Bastien

15 March 2015 29	Lille	3–0	Rennes	Villeneuve-d'Ascq
14:00 CET (UTC+01:00)	Origi 38', 63' (pen.), 72'; Pavard (yellow card) 44'	Report	Doucouré (yellow card) 42'	Stadium: Stade Pierre-Mauroy; Attendance: 34,727; Referee: Clément Turpin

22 March 2015 30	Saint-Étienne	2–0	Lille	Saint-Étienne
14:00 CET (UTC+01:00)	Gradel (yellow card) 19', (goal) 63', 74'; Clément (yellow card) 56'; Tabanou (yellow card) 71'	Report	Balmont (yellow card) 28'; Lopes (red card) 52'	Stadium: Stade Geoffroy-Guichard; Attendance: 32,185; Referee: Saïd Ennjimi

4 April 2015 31	Lille	3–1	Reims	Villeneuve-d'Ascq
20:00 CEST (UTC+02:00)	Corchia 18'; Origi 48'; Kjær (yellow card) 49'; Roux 72'	Report	Bourillon (yellow card) 30'; Diego (yellow card) 38'; De Préville 52'; Signorino (yellow card) 54'	Stadium: Stade Pierre-Mauroy; Attendance: 38,632; Referee: Olivier Thual

12 April 2015 32	Evian	0–1	Lille	Annecy
17:00 CEST (UTC+02:00)	Ninković (yellow card) 22'; Nounkeu (yellow card) 80'; Cambon (yellow card) 81'; Sougou (yellow card) 85'	Report	Kjær (yellow card) 37'; Boufal 81' (pen.); Corchia (yellow card) 90+3'	Stadium: Parc des Sports; Attendance: 9,986; Referee: Fredy Fautrel

18 April 2015 33	Lille	2–0	Bordeaux	Villeneuve-d'Ascq
14:00 CEST (UTC+02:00)	Roux 13'; Mavuba (yellow card) 37'; Balmont (yellow card) 65'; Traoré (yellow card) 86', (goal) 90+4'	Report	Mariano (yellow card) 30'; Poko (yellow card) 65'; Ilori (yellow card) 68'	Stadium: Stade Pierre-Mauroy; Attendance: 37,605; Referee: Mikael Lesage

25 April 2015 34	Paris Saint-Germain	6–1	Lille	Paris
17:00 CEST (UTC+02:00)	Maxwell 1'; Cavani 4', 73' (pen.); Lavezzi 28', 44', 77'; Van der Wiel (yellow card) 76'	Report	Kjær (yellow card) 6'; Corchia (yellow card) 45+1' (yellow-red card) 72'; Baša 59'; Gueye (yellow card) 88'	Stadium: Parc des Princes; Attendance: 45,001; Referee: Clément Turpin; Man of the Match: Ezequiel Lavezzi

3 May 2015 35	Lille	3–1	Lens	Villeneuve-d'Ascq
14:00 CEST (UTC+02:00)	Gueye (yellow card) 14'; Boufal 41' (pen.), (yellow card) 79'; Kjær (yellow card) 69'; Sidibé 74'; Origi 90+4'	Report	Chavarria 24'; Touzghar (yellow card) 28'; Landre (yellow card) 40'; Kantari (yellow card) 81'	Stadium: Stade Pierre-Mauroy; Attendance: 41,435; Referee: Tony Chapron

9 May 2015 36	Toulouse	3–2	Lille	Toulouse
20:00 CEST (UTC+02:00)	Ben Yedder 30'; Bodiger (yellow card) 36'; Trejo 81'; Braithwaite 83'	Report	Roux 9'; Boufal 60'; Sidibé (yellow card) 79'	Stadium: Stadium Municipal; Attendance: 19,830; Referee: Sébastien Desiage

16 May 2015 37	Lille	0–4	Marseille	Villeneuve d'Ascq
21:00 CEST (UTC+02:00)	Balmont (yellow card) 28'; Corchia (yellow card) 39'	Report	Gignac 2'; Fanni 26'; Imbula (yellow card) 37'; Alessandrini (yellow card) 68', (goal) 70'; Ayew 76'; Mendy (yellow card) 81'	Stadium: Stade Pierre-Mauroy; Attendance: 44,286; Referee: Tony Chapron

23 May 2015 38	Metz	1–4	Lille	Metz
21:00 CEST (UTC+02:00)	Palomino 83'	Report	Balmont 40'; Gueye 41'; Roux 44', 69' (pen.)	Stadium: Stade Saint-Symphorien; Attendance: 15,939; Referee: Bartolomeu Varela

=== Coupe de la Ligue ===
17 December 2014 Round of 16	Lille	1–1 (a.e.t.) (6–5 p)	Bordeaux	Villeneuve-d'Ascq
21:00 CET (UTC+01:00)	Frey 30'	Report	Mariano 16', (yellow card) 115'; Pallois (yellow card) 110'	Stadium: Stade Pierre-Mauroy; Attendance: 10,035; Referee: Clément Turpin
	Penalties
	Balmont (penalty missed); Meïté (penalty scored); Rodelin (penalty scored); Sidibé (penalty missed); Mendes (penalty scored); Origi (penalty missed); Enyeama (penalty scored); Rozehnal (penalty scored); Souaré (penalty scored)		(penalty scored) Sertic; (penalty missed) Faubert; (penalty missed) Plašil; (penalty scored) Touré; (penalty scored) Diabaté; (penalty missed) Pallois; (penalty scored) Sané; (penalty scored) Traoré; (penalty missed) Mariano

14 January 2015 Quarter-finals	Lille	2–0	Nantes	Villeneuve-d'Ascq
21:00 CET (UTC+01:00)	Corchia 9'; Baša (yellow card) 53'; Kjær 69'	Report	Gakpé (yellow card) 57'	Stadium: Stade Pierre-Mauroy; Attendance: 11,106; Referee: Ruddy Buquet

3 February 2015 Semi-finals	Lille	0–1	Paris Saint-Germain	Villeneuve-d'Ascq
21:00 CET (UTC+01:00)	Balmont (yellow card) 43'; Sidibé (yellow card) 44'	Report	Maxwell 27'; Lucas (yellow card) 34'; Verratti (yellow card) 45'; David Luiz (yellow card) 51'	Stadium: Stade Pierre-Mauroy; Attendance: 41,977; Referee: Lionel Jaffredo

=== Coupe de France ===
3 January 2015 Round of 64	Bastia	2–0	Lille	Bastia
20:45 CET (UTC+01:00)	Ayité 5', 24'	Report	Meïté (yellow card) 52'; Baša (yellow card) 81'	Stadium: Stade Armand Cesari; Referee: Wilfried Bien

=== UEFA Champions League ===
==== Third qualifying round ====
30 July 2014 First leg	Grasshopper (Switzerland)	0–2	(France) Lille	Zürich, Switzerland
19:00 CEST (UTC+02:00)	Salatić (yellow card) 45'; Tarashaj (yellow card) 84'; Abrashi (yellow card) 85'	Report	Corchia 29'; Mendes 49'	Stadium: Letzigrund; Attendance: 7,700; Referee: Aleksei Eskov (Russia)

5 August 2014 Second leg	Lille (France)	1–1 (3–1 agg.)	(Switzerland) Grasshopper	Villeneuve-d'Ascq, France
20:30 CEST (UTC+02:00)	Balmont 19'; Baša (yellow card) 45+1'; Rodelin (yellow card) 52'; Souaré (yellow card) 90+1'	Report	Abrashi (yellow card) 25', (goal) 33'; Sinkala (yellow card) 43'; Pavlović (red card) 68'; Lang (yellow card) 87'	Stadium: Stade Pierre-Mauroy; Attendance: 24,882; Referee: Tasos Sidiropoulos (Greece)

==== Play-off round ====
20 August 2014 First leg	Lille (France)	0–1	(Portugal) Porto	Villeneuve-d'Ascq, France
20:45 CEST (UTC+02:00)	Balmont (yellow card) 33'; Corchia (yellow card) 52'; Roux (yellow card) 82'	Report	Danilo (yellow card) 7'; Herrera 61'	Stadium: Stade Pierre-Mauroy; Attendance: 33,853; Referee: Björn Kuipers (Netherlands)

26 August 2014 Second leg	Porto (Portugal)	2–0 (3–0 agg.)	(France) Lille	Porto, Portugal
20:45 CEST (UTC+02:00)	Brahimi 49'; Martínez 69'	Report	Mendes (yellow card) 70'; Balmont (yellow card) 81'; Béria (yellow card) 90'	Stadium: Estádio do Dragão; Attendance: 45,208; Referee: Svein Oddvar Moen (Norway)

=== UEFA Europa League ===
==== Group stage ====
Pos	Team	Pld	W	D	L	GF	GA	GD	Pts	Qualification	EVE	WOL	KRA	LIL
1	(England) Everton	6	3	2	1	10	3	+7	11	Advance to knockout phase	—	4–1	0–1	3–0
2	(Germany) VfL Wolfsburg	6	3	1	2	14	10	+4	10	Advance to knockout phase	0–2	—	5–1	1–1
3	(Russia) Krasnodar	6	1	3	2	7	12	−5	6		1–1	2–4	—	1–1
4	(France) Lille	6	0	4	2	3	9	−6	4		0–0	0–3	1–1	—

Source: Soccerway
Rules for classification: Group stage tiebreakers

18 September 2014 1	Lille (France)	1–1	(Russia) Krasnodar	Villeneuve d'Ascq, France
21:05 CEST (UTC+02:00)	Kjær 63'	Report	Granqvist (yellow card) 19'; Laborde 35'; Gazinskiy (yellow card) 62'; Bystrov (yellow card) 78'; Jędrzejczyk (yellow card) 84'	Stadium: Stade Pierre-Mauroy; Attendance: 27,000; Referee: Liran Liany (Israel)

2 October 2014 2	VfL Wolfsburg (Germany)	1–1	(France) Lille	Wolfsburg, Germany
19:00 CEST (UTC+02:00)	Rodríguez (yellow card) 75'; Perišić (yellow card) 79'; De Bruyne 82'; Luiz Gustavo (yellow card) 90'	Report	Origi 77' (pen.); Gueye (yellow card) 84'	Stadium: Volkswagen Arena; Referee: Ovidiu Hațegan (Romania)

23 October 2014 3	Lille (France)	0–0	(England) Everton	Villeneuve d'Ascq, France
19:00 CEST (UTC+02:00)	Béria (yellow card) 57'	Report	Bešić (yellow card) 15'; Pienaar (yellow card) 57'	Stadium: Stade Pierre-Mauroy; Referee: Manuel de Sousa (Portugal)

6 November 2014 4	Everton (England)	3–0	(France) Lille	Liverpool, England
21:05 CET (UTC+01:00)	Osman 27'; Jagielka 42'; Naismith 61'; Barry (yellow card) 67'	Report	Mavuba (yellow card) 28'; Balmont (yellow card) 86'	Stadium: Goodison Park; Referee: Bas Nijhuis (Netherlands)

27 November 2014 5	Krasnodar (Russia)	1–1	(France) Lille	Krasnodar, Russia
18:00 CET (UTC+01:00)	Ari 34'; Pereyra (yellow card) 55'; Petrov (yellow card) 85'; Wánderson (yellow card) 90+3'	Report	Gueye (yellow card) 64'; Roux 78', (yellow card) 83'; Baša (yellow card) 89'	Stadium: Kuban Stadium; Referee: Ivan Kružliak (Slovakia)

11 December 2014 6	Lille (France)	0–3	(Germany) VfL Wolfsburg	Villeneuve d'Ascq, France
21:05 CET (UTC+01:00)	Mavuba (yellow card) 62'; Balmont (yellow card) 72'; Souaré (yellow card) 87'	Report	Vieirinha 45'; Guilavogui (yellow card) 46' (yellow-red card) 54'; Rodríguez 64', 89' (pen.); Luiz Gustavo (yellow card) 90'	Stadium: Stade Pierre-Mauroy; Referee: Halis Özkahya (Turkey)
