= Florent Balmont =

French footballer (born 1980)

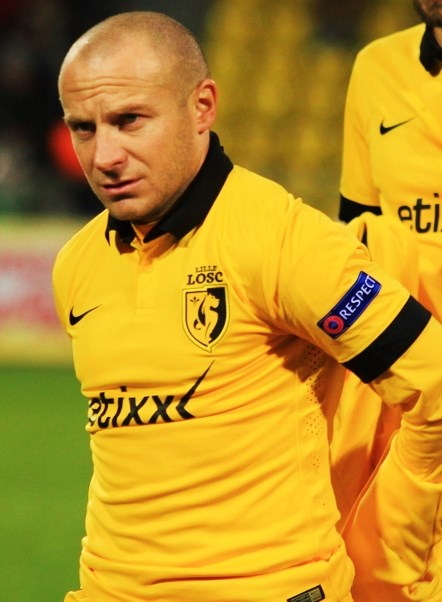
- Balmont with Lille in 2014

Personal information
- Date of birth: 2 February 1980 (age 46)
- Place of birth: Sainte-Foy-lès-Lyon, France
- Height: 1.67 m (5 ft 6 in)
- Position: Midfielder

Youth career
- 1997–2002: Lyon

Senior career*
Years	Team	Apps	(Gls)
2002–2004	Lyon	11	(1)
2003–2004	→ Toulouse (loan)	34	(0)
2004–2008	Nice	139	(4)
2008–2016	Lille	253	(7)
2016–2020	Dijon	75	(1)
Total		512	(13)

Managerial career
- 2020–2021: Limonest (staff)
- * Club domestic league appearances and goals

Florent Balmont (born 2 February 1980) is a French former professional footballer who played as a midfielder.

== Career ==
Balmont began his career at Lyon in the 2002–03 Ligue 1 season after coming through the junior ranks. In the 2003–04 season, Balmont was sent out on loan to Toulouse making a total of 35 appearances. After returning from loan, Balmont signed with Nice. In his time with Lyon, Balmont won the 2002–03 championship and the 2004 Trophée des Champions, converting his penalty in the latter after the match went to a shoot-out.

Balmont spent four seasons at Nice making 139 appearances before signing with Lille. Balmont won an historic double with the club during the 2010–11 season, making 39 appearances across all competitions as Lille won the Ligue 1 title and the Coupe de France trophy.

In July 2017, Balmont announced he had left Lille to join Dijon, newly promoted to Ligue 1, on a two-year contract.

On 11 May 2019, Balmont made his 500th Ligue 1 appearance in a 2–1 victory over Strasbourg. With the appearance, he moved up to 21st in the all-time Ligue 1 appearances and leads all active players in that category.

Balmont announced his retirement from playing in May 2020 and stated his intention to go into coaching. In July 2020, after his retirement, Balmont began his training as a coach, as he was hired as a U-20 coach and member of the first team staff at Championnat National 3 club FC Limonest Dardilly Saint-Didier. He left the club at the end of the season.

== Career statistics ==
Appearances and goals by club, season and competition
Club	Season	League			National cup		League cup		Europe		Other		Total	
Club	Season	Division	Apps	Goals	Apps	Goals	Apps	Goals	Apps	Goals	Apps	Goals	Apps	Goals
Lyon	2002–03	Ligue 1	9	0	0	0	1	0	0	0	–		10	0
Lyon	2004–05	Ligue 1	2	1	0	0	0	0	0	0	–		2	1
Lyon	Total		11	1	0	0	1	0	0	0	0	0	12	1
Toulouse (loan)	2003–04	Ligue 1	34	0	2	0	1	0	–		–		37	0
Nice	2004–05	Ligue 1	34	4	2	0	1	0	0	0	–		37	4
Nice	2005–06	Ligue 1	37	0	0	0	4	1	0	0	–		41	1
Nice	2006–07	Ligue 1	32	0	1	0	1	0	0	0	–		34	0
Nice	2007–08	Ligue 1	36	0	2	1	2	0	0	0	–		40	1
Nice	Total		139	4	5	1	8	1	0	0	0	0	152	6
Lille	2008–09	Ligue 1	34	0	4	0	1	1	0	0	–		39	1
Lille	2009–10	Ligue 1	35	2	0	0	1	0	12	1	–		48	3
Lille	2010–11	Ligue 1	27	0	5	0	1	0	6	0	–		39	0
Lille	2011–12	Ligue 1	30	2	3	0	2	0	5	0	1 (Note: Appearance in 2011 Trophée des Champions)	1	41	3
Lille	2012–13	Ligue 1	34	2	2	1	1	0	7	0	–		44	3
Lille	2013–14	Ligue 1	35	0	2	0	0	0	0	0	–		37	0
Lille	2014–15	Ligue 1	30	1	1	0	3	0	10	1	–		44	2
Lille	2015–16	Ligue 1	28	0	0	0	3	0	0	0	–		31	0
Lille	Total		253	7	17	1	12	1	40	2	1	1	323	12
Dijon	2016–17	Ligue 1	23	0	0	0	0	0	–		–		23	0
Dijon	2017–18	Ligue 1	21	1	1	0	1	0	–		–		23	1
Dijon	2018–19	Ligue 1	20	0	4	1	2	0	–		2 (Note: Appearances in Ligue 1 relegation play-offs)	0	28	1
Dijon	2019–20	Ligue 1	11	0	4	0	1	0	–		–		16	0
Dijon	Total		75	1	9	1	4	0	0	0	2	0	90	2
Dijon II	2018–19	National 3	1	0	–		–		–		–		1	0
Career total			513	13	33	3	26	2	40	2	3	1	615	21

== Honours ==
Lyon

- Ligue 1: 2002–03
- Trophée des Champions: 2004

Lille

- Ligue 1: 2010–11
- Coupe de France: 2010–11
