= Aurélien Capoue =

French footballer (born 1982)

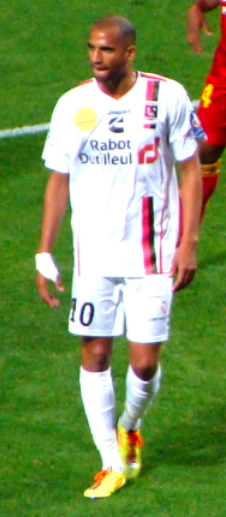
- Capoue playing for Boulogne in 2011

Personal information
- Full name: Aurélien Jacques Capoue
- Date of birth: 28 February 1982 (age 44)
- Place of birth: Niort, France
- Height: 1.85 m (6 ft 1 in)
- Position: Left midfielder

Youth career
- 1991–2001: Chamois Niortais

Senior career*
Years	Team	Apps	(Gls)
2001–2003	Fontenay-le-Comte	49	(8)
2003–2004	SO Romorantin	33	(5)
2004–2011	Nantes	116	(7)
2009–2010	→ Auxerre (loan)	21	(0)
2011–2013	Boulogne	24	(2)
Total		243	(22)

International career
2007–2013	Guadeloupe	7	(0)
- * Club domestic league appearances and goals

Aurélien Jacques Capoue (born 28 February 1982) is a French former professional footballer who played as a left midfielder.

== International career ==
Capoue made his debut for Guadeloupe at the CONCACAF Gold Cup Finals in June 2007 against Haiti. He has been called up to the Guadeloupe squad for the 2009 CONCACAF Gold Cup.

== Personal life ==
Capoue's younger brother, Étienne, is also a professional footballer, who most recently played for Villarreal.
