= Stéphane Dumont =

French footballer (born 1982)

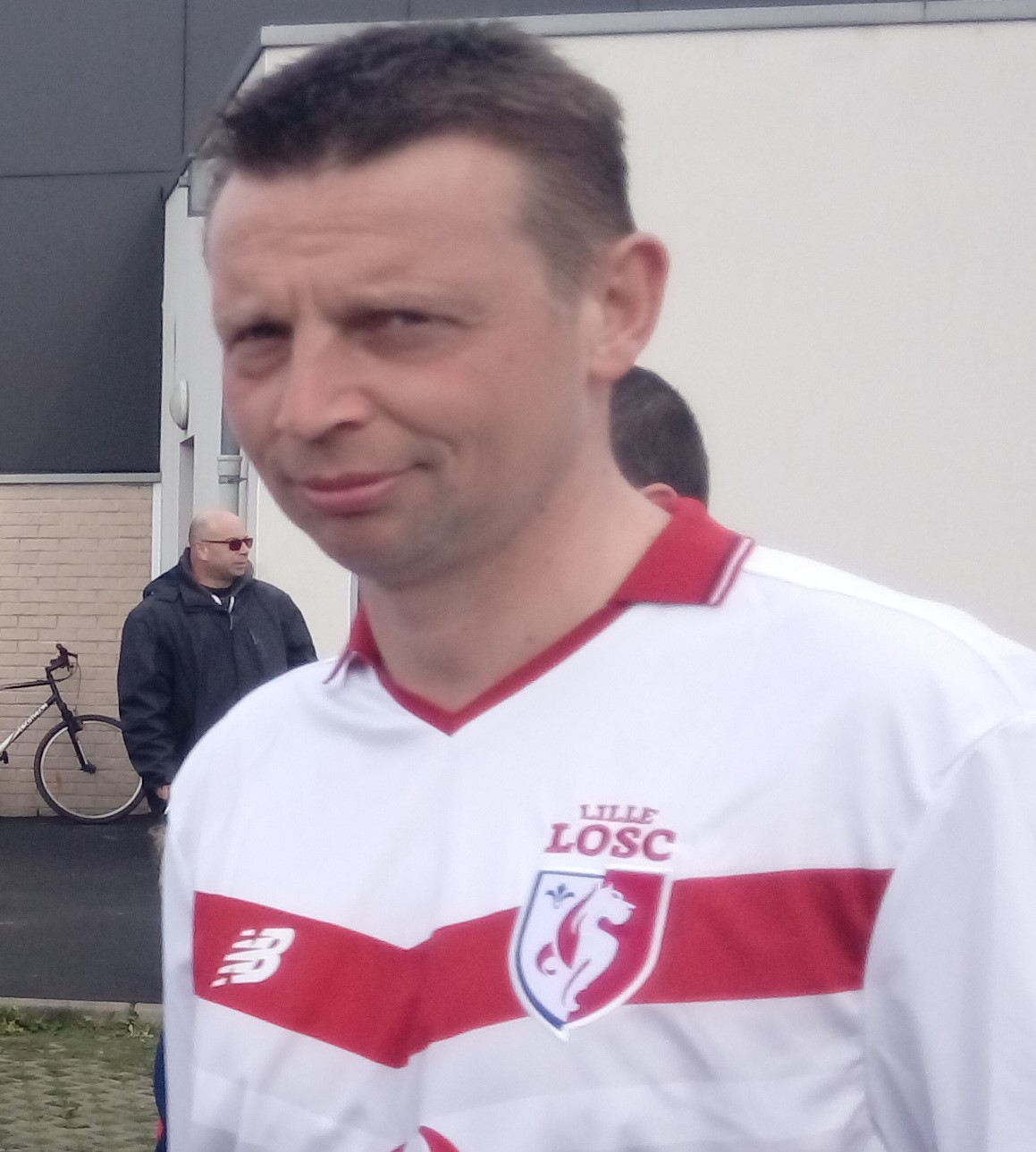
- Dumont in 2017

Personal information
- Date of birth: 6 September 1982 (age 44)
- Place of birth: Seclin, France
- Height: 1.83 m (6 ft 0 in)
- Position: Midfielder

Team information
- Current team: Troyes (manager)

Youth career
- 1992–2003: Lille

Senior career*
Years	Team	Apps	(Gls)
2003–2011	Lille	138	(9)
2011–2013	Monaco	18	(0)
Total		156	(9)

Managerial career
- 2021–2024: Guingamp
- 2024–: Troyes
- * Club domestic league appearances and goals

Stéphane Dumont (born 6 September 1982) is a French professional football manager and former player who played as a midfielder. He is the head coach of Ligue 1 club Troyes.

== Playing career ==
=== Lille ===
Born in Seclin, Dumont started his career at Lille in 2003. He came to the forefront thanks to the departure of Benoît Cheyrou. Having signed his first contract during the 2002–03 season, he enjoyed a good start to the season before a broken ankle led to a season of merely training and little else. Claude Puel, who was then the coach of Lille, decided to use Dumont as a backup for Mathieu Bodmer and Jean Makoun in midfield. He played for Lille over the eight seasons until 2011, a year in which the team won the league title, making 138 appearances and netting 9 goals.

=== Monaco ===
On 18 July 2011, Dumont moved to the relegated Ligue 2 club Monaco on a three-year contract. On 15 July 2013, he and Monaco agreed to mutually terminate their contract. He subsequently retired.

== Managerial career ==
From 2015 to 2017, Dumont worked as an assistant manager for Lille, his former club. He occupied the same type of role with Reims from 2017 to 2021. On 27 May 2021, he was appointed head coach of Ligue 2 club Guingamp on a two-year contract with an option for a third year in case of a promotion to Ligue 1.

== Managerial statistics ==
As of 20 November 2026

Managerial record by team and tenure
Team	Nat.	From	To	Record							
Team	Nat.	From	To	G	W	D	L	GF	GA	GD	Win %
Guingamp	(France)	1 July 2021	30 June 2024	122	47	37	38	165	143	+22	38.52
Troyes	(France)	12 August 2024	present	89	44	14	31	127	93	+34	49.44
Total				211	91	51	69	292	236	+56	43.13

== Honours ==
=== Player ===
Lille

- Ligue 1: 2010–11
- Coupe de France: 2010–11

== Sources ==
- Dumont, symbol of Lille OSC
- Stéphane Dumont at ESPN FC
