= Túlio de Melo =

Brazilian footballer (born 1985)

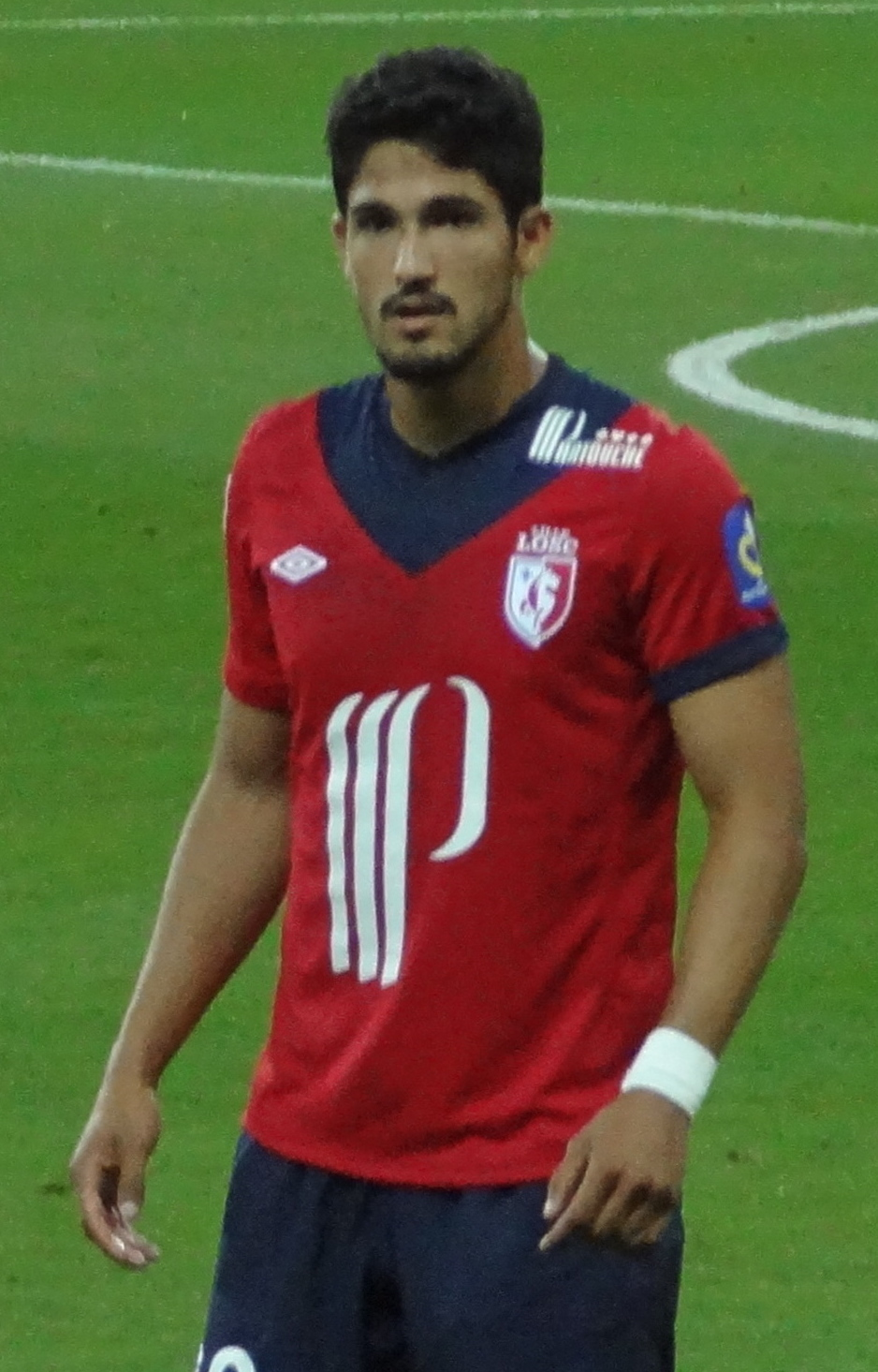
- Túlio de Melo with Lille in 2012

Personal information
- Full name: Túlio Vinícius Fróes de Melo
- Date of birth: 31 January 1985 (age 41)
- Place of birth: Montes Claros, Brazil
- Height: 1.93 m (6 ft 4 in)
- Position: Striker

Youth career
- Atlético Mineiro

Senior career*
Years	Team	Apps	(Gls)
2003–2005	Atlético Mineiro	0	(0)
2004–2005	→ AaB (loan)	19	(6)
2005–2008	Le Mans	72	(22)
2008	Palermo	0	(0)
2008–2014	Lille	101	(18)
2013	Lille B	1	(1)
2014	Evian	5	(0)
2015	Valladolid	11	(2)
2015	Chapecoense	13	(5)
2016	Sport	26	(7)
2017	Chapecoense	24	(7)
2018	Avispa Fukuoka	7	(0)
Total		279	(68)
- * Club domestic league appearances and goals

Túlio Vinícius Fróes de Melo (born 31 January 1985) is a Brazilian former professional footballer who played as a striker.

== Career ==
=== Early career & Breakthrough (2003–08) ===
Túlio de Melo started his career with Atlético Mineiro, and moved to Europe in 2004 to join Danish top-flight team Aalborg BK on loan. In 2005, he signed a three-year contract with French club Le Mans, where he gained a reputation as a powerful striker with the ability to lob keepers of international class from range. His impressive performances in the first half of the 2007–08 season (10 goals in 19 matches) caused interest from higher-level teams, namely Serie A clubs Palermo and Parma. His name later caused controversy between these teams as it appeared he actually signed contracts with both clubs, but eventually it was Palermo who finalized his signing. Palermo paid the agent "SCMG Sport Consulting & Management Gmbh" €3.8 million to sign his outright.

=== Palermo/France ===
Túlio de Melo joined the Rosanero in July 2008, but he was soon listed for transfer by the club, and managed only to play 45 minutes in a Coppa Italia match, a 2–1 home loss to Ravenna.

On 31 August 2008 Ligue 1 club Lille announced to have completed the signing of Túlio de Melo from Palermo, for €4 million.

Túlio de Melo left Lille in January 2014, signing with Evian Thonon Gaillard. However, he only appeared in five matches, and was subsequently released.

=== Valladolid ===
On 29 January 2015, Túlio de Melo signed a six-month deal with Spanish Segunda División side Real Valladolid.

== Honours ==
Lille

- Ligue 1: 2010–11
- Coupe de France: 2010–11

Chapecoense

- Campeonato Catarinense: 2017
