= Saïd Ennjimi =

French-Moroccan football referee

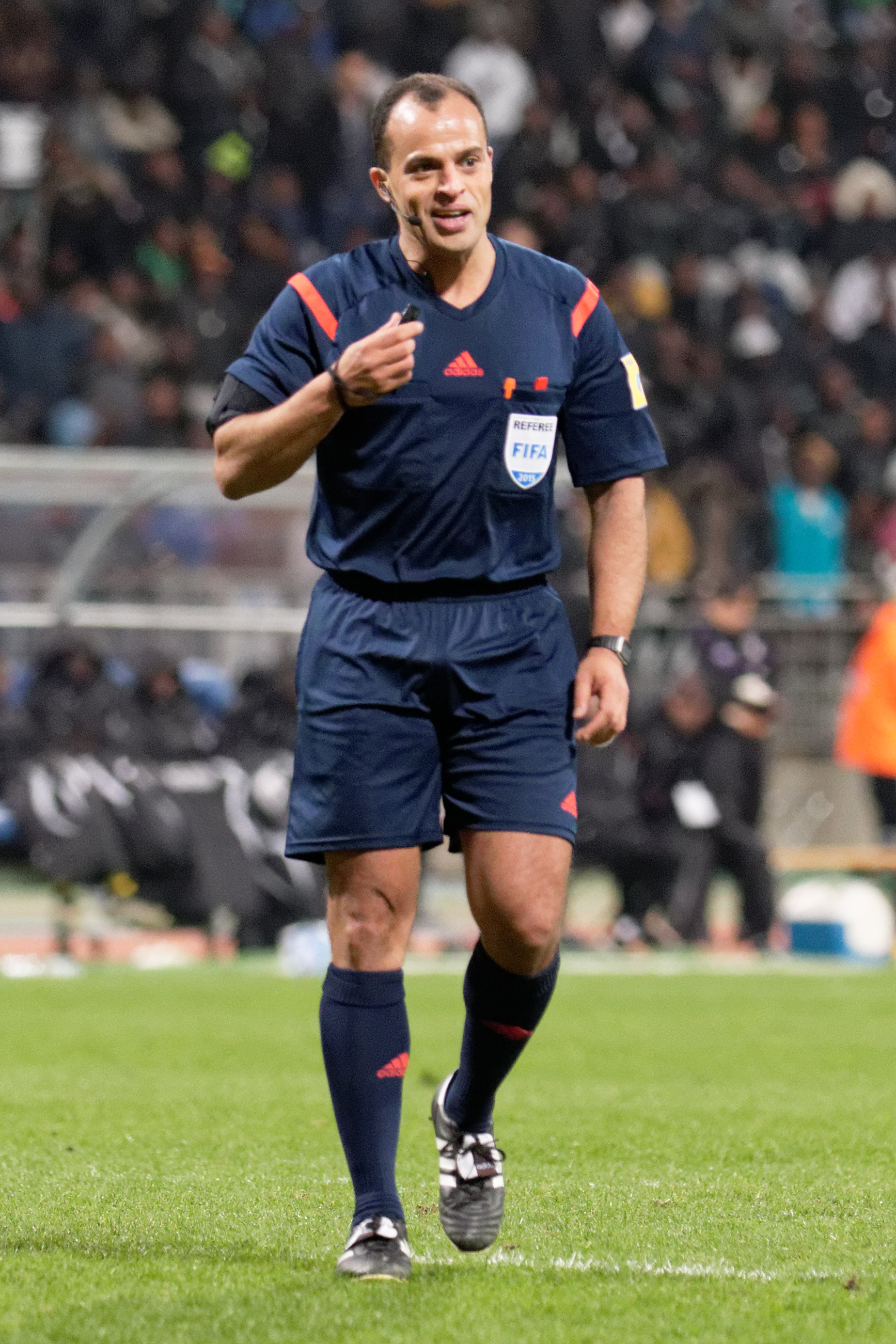
- Mali vs Ghana, exhibition game, March 2015.
- Full name: Saïd Ennjimi
- Born: 13 June 1973 (age 53); Casablanca, Morocco

Domestic
Years	League	Role
2005–	Ligue 1	Referee

International
Years	League	Role
2009–	UEFA	Referee

Saïd Ennjimi (born 13 June 1973) is a French-Moroccan football referee. He is registered as a Fédéral 1 referee in France meaning he is eligible to officiate Ligue 1 and Ligue 2 matches, as well as matches in the Coupe de France and Coupe de la Ligue.

Ennjimi became a FIFA referee in 2008.
