= Fredy Fautrel =

French football referee

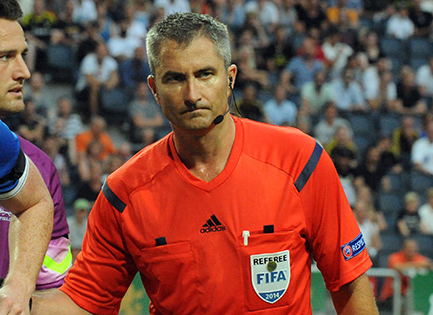
- Full name: Fredy Fautrel
- Born: 31 October 1971 (age 54); Avranches, France

Domestic
Years	League	Role
2003–	Ligue 1	Referee

International
Years	League	Role
2007–	FIFA	Referee

Fredy Fautrel (born 31 October 1971) is a French football referee. Born in Avranches, Fautrel became a referee in 1993 and has been registered as a Fédéral 1 referee since 2003 meaning he is eligible to officiate Ligue 1 and Ligue 2 matches, as well as matches in the Coupe de France and Coupe de la Ligue. He also serves as a referee for UEFA and FIFA matches, having become a FIFA referee in 2007.

Fautrel has officiated in qualifiers for the Euro 2008 and 2010 World Cup tournaments.
