= Franck Béria =

French footballer (born 1983)

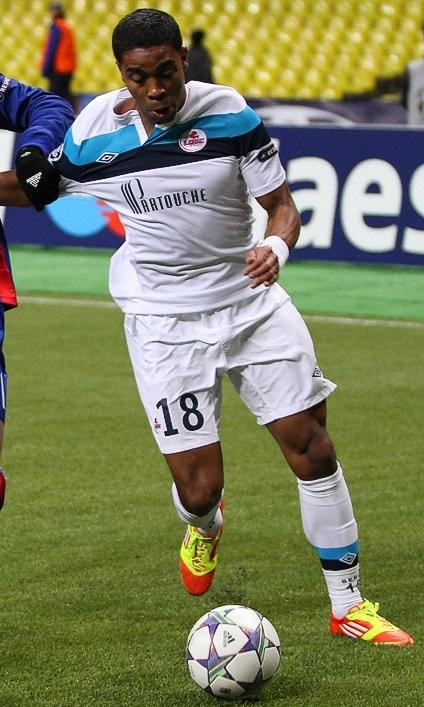
- Béria in 2011

Personal information
- Date of birth: 23 May 1983 (age 43)
- Place of birth: Argenteuil, France
- Height: 1.80 m (5 ft 11 in)
- Position: Right-back

Team information
- Current team: Lille (Director of professional football)

Youth career
- 1996–1999: INF Clairefontaine
- 1999–2001: Metz

Senior career*
Years	Team	Apps	(Gls)
2001–2007	Metz	93	(0)
2007–2017	Lille	250	(4)
2014–2016	Lille B	5	(0)
Total		348	(4)

International career
2001	France U19	1	(0)
2004	France U21	4	(0)

Managerial career
- 2017–: Lille (director of professional football)
- * Club domestic league appearances and goals

Franck Béria (born 23 May 1983) is a French former professional footballer who played as a right-back. He works as a director of professional football at Lille.

== Club career ==
At the end of the 2016–17 season, Béria ended his career as a player.

== International career ==
Béria was born in France and is of Malagasy descent. He is a one-time youth international for the France U19s in a 4–0 win over Albania's U19s. He played the France U21s at the 2004 Toulon tournament.

== Honours ==
Lille

- Ligue 1: 2010–11
- Coupe de France: 2010–11
