= Seydoux =

Seydoux (French: [sɛdu]) is a French-language surname. Notable people with the surname include:

- Camille Seydoux (born 1982), French stylist
- Balthazar Seydoux (born 1971), Monegasque politician
- François Seydoux de Clausonne (1905–1981), French diplomat
- Jacques Seydoux (1870–1929), French diplomat and economist
- Léa Seydoux (born 1985), French actress
- Léo Seydoux (born 1998), Swiss footballer
- Michel Seydoux (born 1947), French businessman and film producer
- Philippe Seydoux (born 1985), Swiss ice hockey player
- Roger Seydoux (1908–1985), French academic and diplomat
