= Seydoux family =

French family

Seydoux
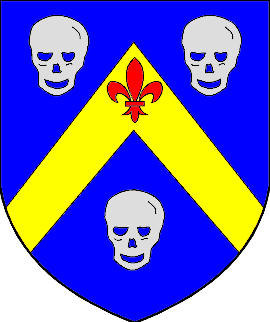
- Coat of Arms of the French branch
- Country: France
- Origin: Vaulruz
- Traditions: Protestantism

The Seydoux family is a prominent French family descended from François Seydoux (1767–1819), from Vevey, Switzerland, and originally from Vaulruz, in the canton of Fribourg.

Since the 19th century, members of the Seydoux family have distinguished themselves in the fields of industry and finance, but also in diplomacy, and, more recently, in cinema:

- Jacques Seydoux (1870–1929), diplomat and economist
- François Seydoux (1905–1981), diplomat
- Michel Seydoux (born 1947), businessman and film producer
- Jérôme Seydoux (born 1934), businessman and film producer
- Léa Seydoux (born 1985), actress

== History ==
The Seydoux family descends from François Seydoux (1767–1819), a bourgeois originally from the Swiss town of Vaulruz, canton of Fribourg. His father, André Seydoux (1732–1795), was the first to come to France. Originally Catholic, François returned to Switzerland where he converted to Protestantism to marry Angélique Brelaz; he then returned to Paris to engage in various businesses. In the 19th century, his sons Charles (1796-1875) and Auguste (1801-1878) developed a textile company in northern France. Its original location was in Le Cateau-Cambrésis. Their descendants have distinguished themselves in various fields.

In 1902, the Seydoux family joined the noble Fornier de Clausonne family through the marriage of Jacques Seydoux to Mathilde de Clausonne. During the 1930s, their children, René, François, Georgette and Roger Seydoux, were authorized by a decree of 27 July 1934 to add the name "Fornier de Clausonne" to their own.

René Seydoux (Fornier de Clausonne) joined the Schlumberger family through his marriage to Geneviève Schlumberger. She created the Fondation René-Seydoux to "develop and reinforce the solidarity that unites the countries of the Mediterranean". Their son, Jérôme (born 1934), became manager of the Pathé film company.

== Selected members ==
- François Seydoux (1767–1819), bourgeois of Vevey
  - Charles Seydoux (1796–1875), promoter of the wool industry in Le Cateau-Cambrésis, deputy of Nord, Commandeur of the Legion of Honour, married to Louisa Gourgas
    - Anna Seydoux (1829–1916), wife of the manufacturer Paul Bacot
    - Élise Seydoux (1832–1893), wife of General Pierre Hippolyte Publius Renault
    - Auguste Seydoux (1836–1890), diplomat
      - Jacques Seydoux (1870–1929), diplomat and economist, husband in 1902 of Mathilde Fornier de Clausonne (1880–1971)
        - René Seydoux Fornier de Clausonne (1903–1973), geophysicist, secretary general of the École libre des sciences politiques from 1928 to 1937, president of Schlumberger, founder of the Université méditerranéenne d'été, married to Geneviève Schlumberger (daughter of Marcel Schlumberger), who created the Fondation René-Seydoux
          - Véronique Seydoux Fornier de Clausonne, wife of Philippe Rossillon
          - Jérôme Seydoux (born 1934), businessman, PDG of Pathé, Officier of the Legion of Honour, husband of Hélène Zumbiehl (remarried to Sophie Desserteaux)
            - Henri Seydoux (born 1960), businessman, co-founder and president of Parrot, shareholder of Christian Louboutin, member of the board of directors of Schlumberger, husband of his cousin Valérie Schlumberger (remarried to Farida Khelfa)
              - Léa Seydoux (born 1985), actress
              - Camille Seydoux (born 1982), stylist
          - Nicolas Seydoux (born 1939), businessman, PDG of Gaumont, Officier and Commandeur of the Legion of Honour.
            - Sidonie Dumas (born 1967), director general of Gaumont.
          - Michel Seydoux (born 1947), businessman, producer and cinema administrator, former president of the football club LOSC Lille Métropole, Chevalier of the Ordre des Arts et des Lettres
        - François Seydoux de Clausonne (1905–1981), diplomat and conseiller d'État, Grand Officier of the Legion of Honour
          - Liliane Seydoux Fornier de Clausonne (born 1932), wife of Pierre Peugeot
          - Laurence Seydoux Fornier de Clausonne, wife of Daniel Fries, university doctor
            - Fabrice Fries (born 1960), married in 1997 to Fabrizia Benini
            - Charles Fries (born 1962), diplomat
            - Mathilde Fries, wife of Olaf Raviot de Saint-Anthost
          - Jacques Seydoux Fornier de Clausonne (born 1936), banker, established Paribas bank in Monaco, worked at J.P. Morgan and David de Rothschild, and served as managing director of the Société des Bains de Mer de Monaco
            - Balthazar Seydoux (born 1971), husband of Annabelle Jaeger, national councilor of Monaco and professional headhunter
            - Tigrane Seydoux Fornier de Clausonne, PDG of the Big Mamma restaurant group.
        - Georgette Seydoux Fornier de Clausonne (1906–1995), husband of the engineer and industrialist Philippe Coste (1904–1974)
        - Roger Seydoux (1908–1985), diplomat, director of the École libre des sciences politiques then of the Institut d'études politiques de Paris, president of the Fondation de France
          - Éric Seydoux (1946–2013), screen printer, art publisher, Officier of the Ordre des Arts et des Lettres.
  - Auguste Seydoux (1801–1878), manufacturer, mayor of Le Cateau, general councilor of Nord.
    - Angélique Seydoux (1823–1883), wife of Henri Sieber, regent of the Bank of France.
    - Charles Seydoux (1827–1896), textile industrialist, president of the General Council of Nord from 1892 to 1896
      - Ernest Seydoux (1860–1942), husband of Lucie Ducimetière-Monod, industrialist.
      - Alfred Seydoux (1862–1911), husband of Alice de Mallmann, industrialist, regent of the Bank of France, general councilor of the North.
        - Marie-Louise Seydoux (1891–1938), wife of Pierre Mussat.
        - Jeanne Seydoux (1893–1961), wife of Jean Poron.
        - Gisèle Seydoux (1898–1983), wife of André Doé de Maindrevile.
        - Henri Seydoux (1900–1965), husband of Marie Olivier, industrialist, general councilor of the Nord department.
        - Jaqueline Seydoux (1901–1977), wife of Donatien de La Roche Fordière.
          - Maurice Seydoux (1904–1944), husband of Christiane Duvette, secretary general of the Conseil d'État.
      - Hélène Seydoux (1864–1930), wife of Ferdinand Roy (1856–1927), president of the Union des syndicats patronaux des industries textiles de France (son of Gustave Emmanuel Roy)
      - Albert Seydoux (1866–1918), husband of Emma Krug, Saint-Cyrien, industrialist, deputy of Nord.
      - Georges Seydoux (1869–1928), husband of Louisa Krug.
        - Roland Seydoux (1917–1944), agricultural engineer, resistance fighter of the Réseau Alliance, died in deportation to Natzweiler-Struthof.
      - André Seydoux (1871–1927), husband of Renée Bovet, centralien, industrialist, chairman of the board of directors of the Caisse d'épargne du Cateau, general councillor of the Nord, vice president of the Union des syndicats patronaux des industries textiles de France.
        - Ronald Seydoux (1902–1991)
          - Harry Seydoux, wife of Maria Zulema Anze de Zamora
            - Stéphanie Seydoux (born 1967), ambassador for global health, representative of France on the boards of The Global Fund to Fight AIDS, Tuberculosis and Malaria and UNITAID.
      - Madeleine Seydoux (1877–1939), wife of James Carmichael
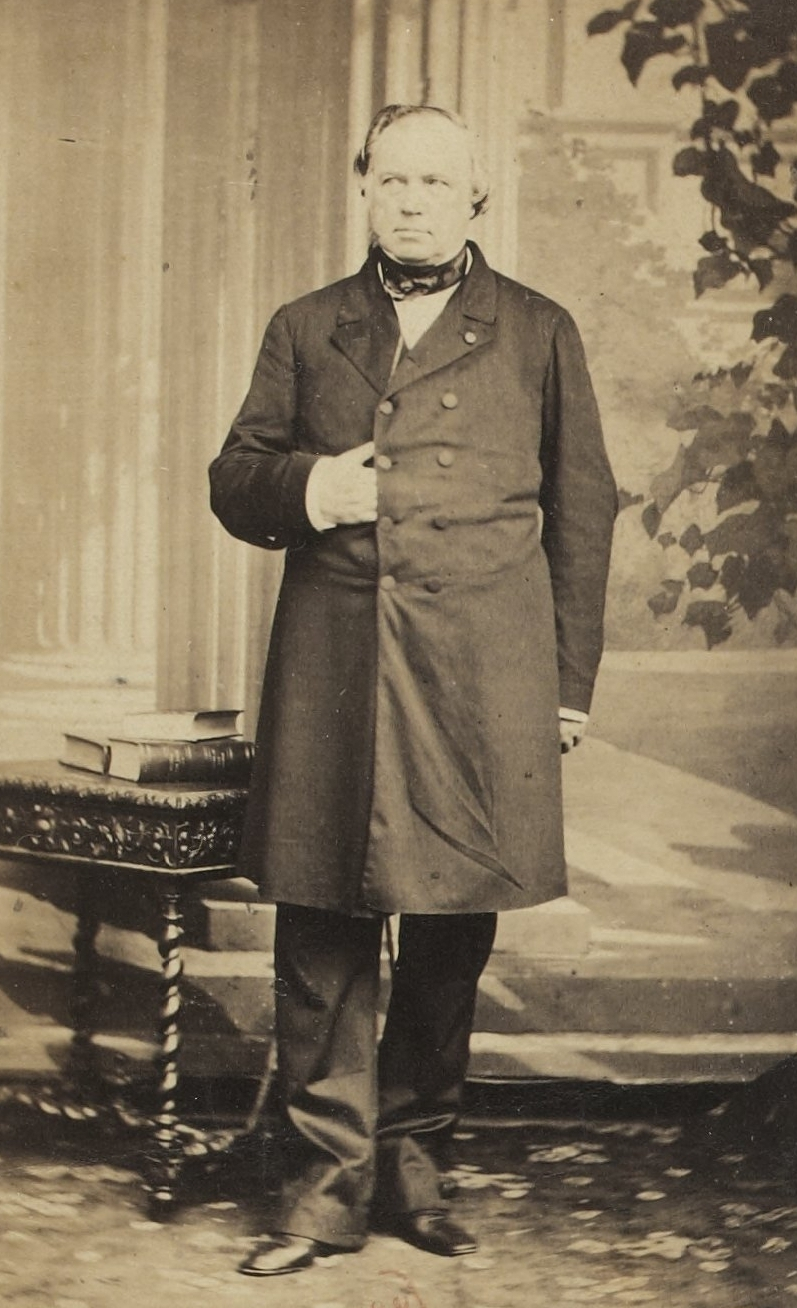
Charles Seydoux (1796–1875)

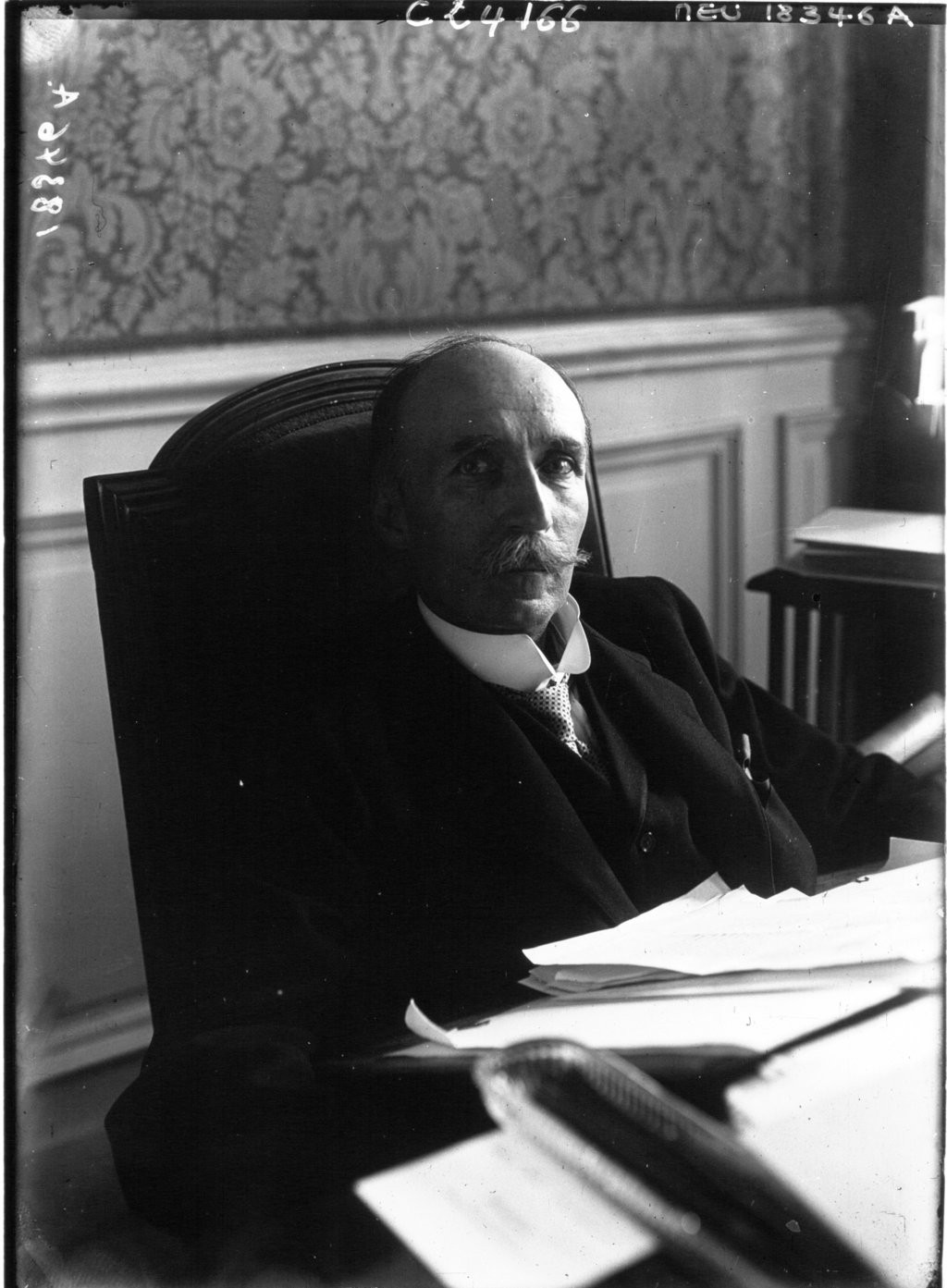
Jacques Seydoux, 1924

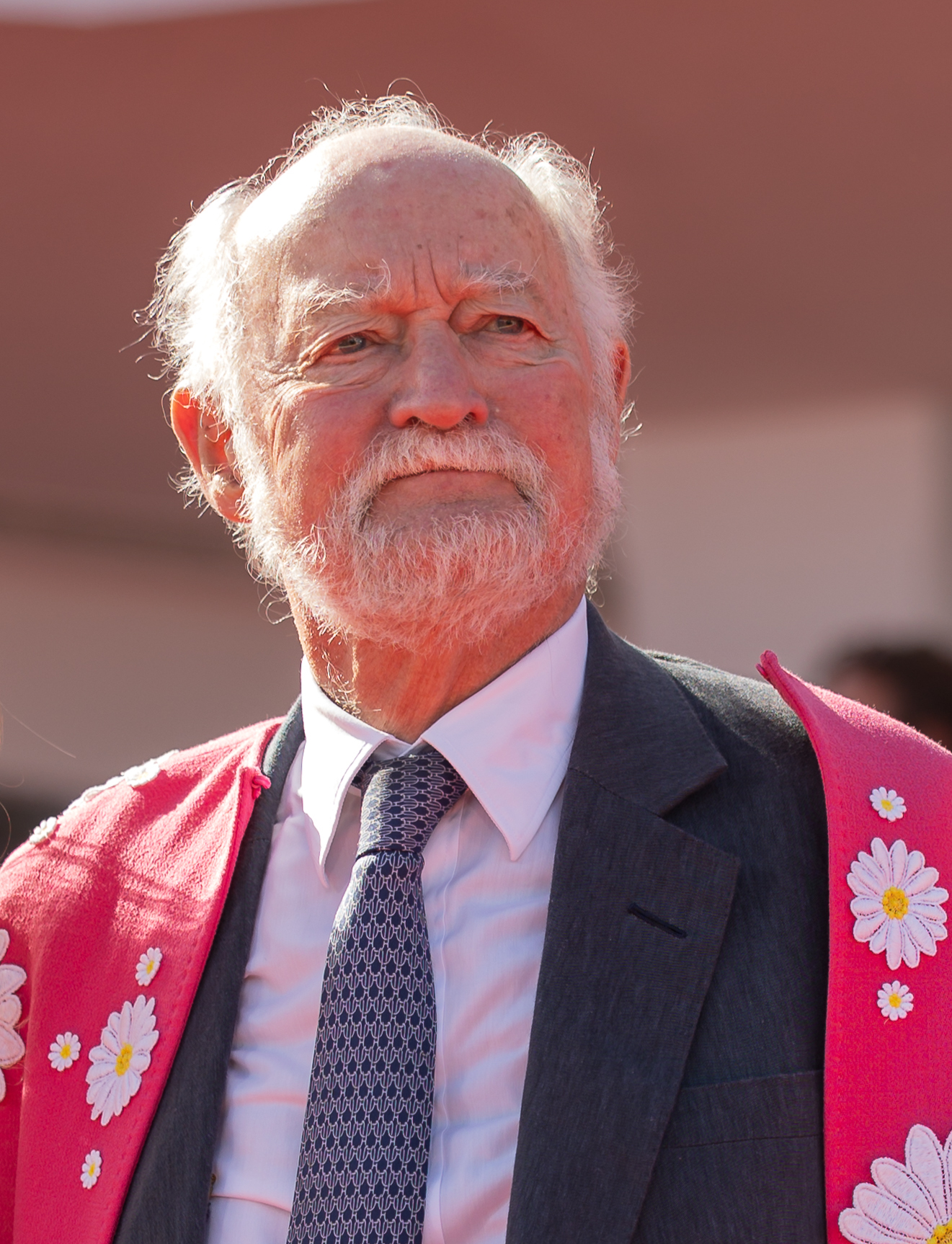
Nicolas Seydoux, 2025

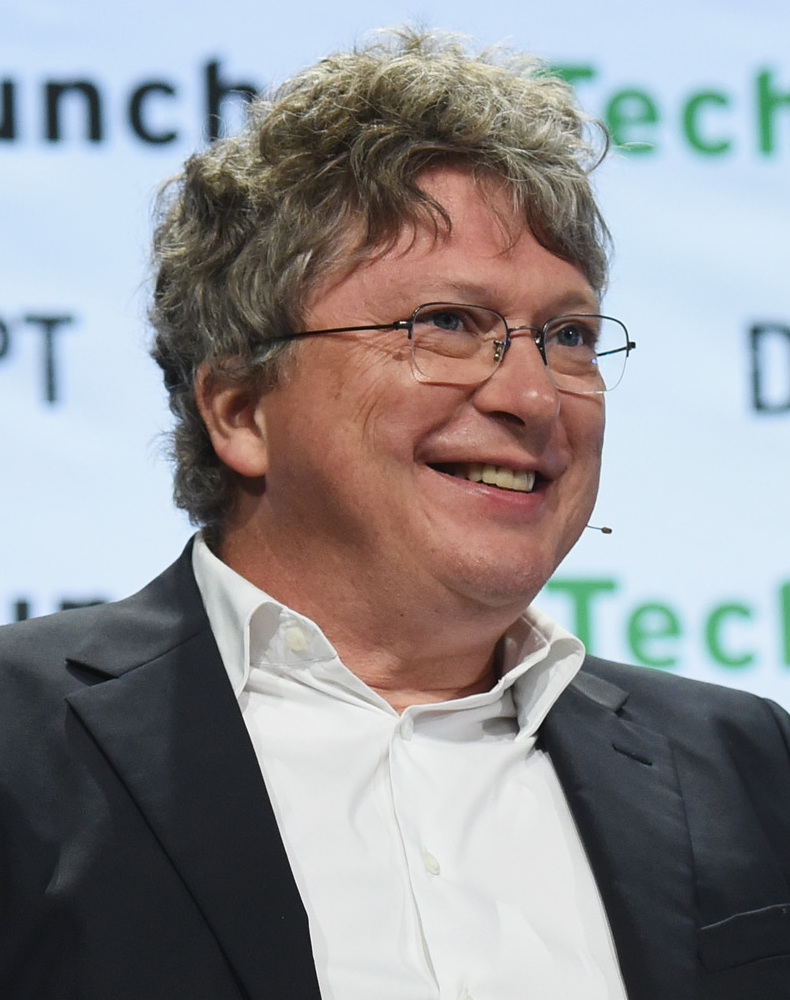
Henri Seydoux, 2016

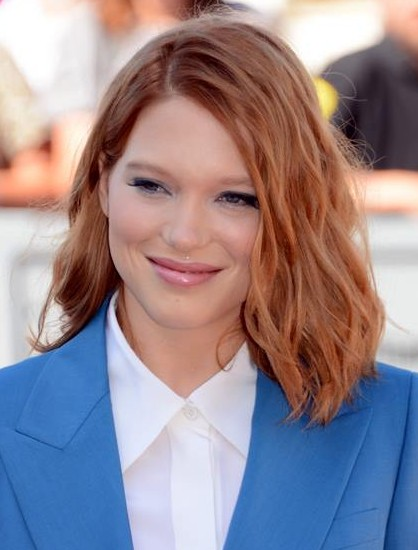
Léa Seydoux, 2014

== See also ==
- Haute société protestante

== Bibliography ==
- Vaillant-Gabet, Sylvie (1996). La famille Seydoux : une dynastie patronale au Cateau-Cambrésis et sa population ouvrière (1851-1939)..
- Olivier, Patrick (1989). Famille Seydoux : premier recueil de données historique. Association de la Famille Seydoux. ISBN 978-2-9502455-4-0..
- Bouvart, C., Seydoux, O., Association de la famille Seydoux (1994). La famille Seydoux au Cateau-Cambrésis : cent cinquante ans de présence, deuxième recueil de données historiques. Association de la famille Seydoux.
- Bacqué, Raphaëlle (28 October 2013). "Le clan des Seydoux". Le Monde.
- Tanguy, Gilles (February 2014). "Les petits secrets des propriétaires de Gaumont et Pathé : la famille Seydoux". Capital. No. 269. pp. 34–36.
