= René Massigli =

French diplomat (1888–1988)

René Massigli GCVO KBE CH
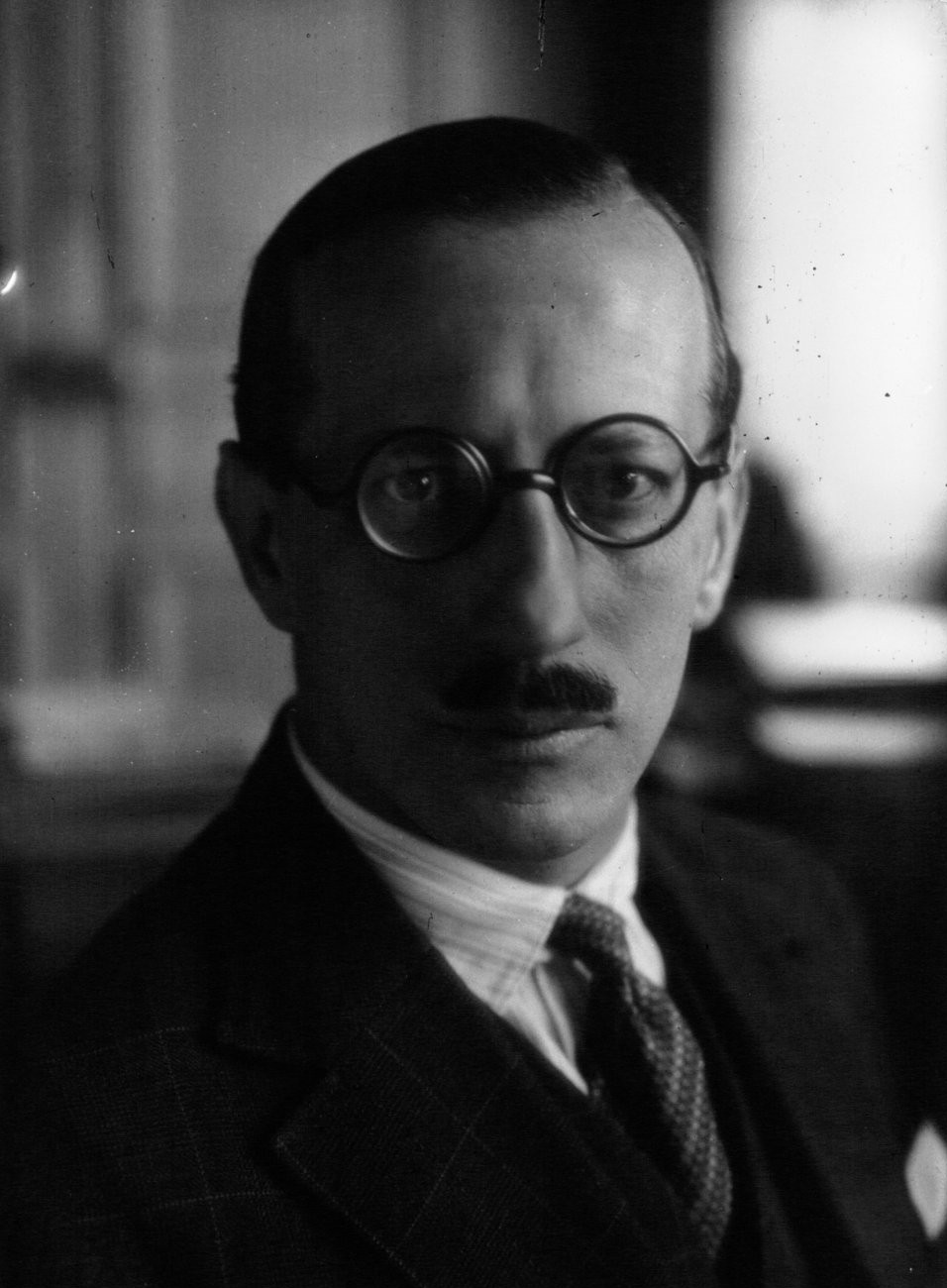
- Massigli in 1929

Ambassador of France to the United Kingdom
- In office 1944–1955

Free French foreign minister
- In office 1943–1944

ambassador of France to Turkey
- In office 1938–1940

secretary-general for the Conference of Ambassadors
- In office 1920–1931

Personal details
- Born: 22 March 1888
- Died: 3 February 1988 (aged 99)

René Massigli GCVO KBE CH (French: [ʁəne masiɡli]; 22 March 1888 – 3 February 1988) was a French diplomat who played a leading role as a senior official at the Quai d'Orsay and was regarded as one of the leading French experts on Germany, which he greatly distrusted.

== Early career ==
The son of a Protestant law professor, Massigli was born in Montpellier in the southern French department of Hérault. After graduating from the elite École normale supérieure in Paris with an agrégation d'histoire, he attended the French Academy in Rome in 1911-1912, studying history under Louis Duchesne. In 1913-1914, he attended the University of Lille, where he was awarded a maître de conférence.

He joined the French foreign service during the First World War. He served in the Maison de la Presse section of the Quai d'Orsay in Bern, Switzerland, where he analysed German newspapers for the French government. In the spring of 1919, Massigli was sent on several unofficial missions to Berlin to contact German officials about the terms of the Treaty of Versailles. In May 1919, Massigli had a series of secret meetings with various German officials in which he offered on behalf of his government to revise the peace terms of the upcoming treaty in Germany's favour in regards to territorial and economic clauses of the proposed treaty. Massigli suggested "practical, verbal discussions" between French and German officials in the hope of creating "collaboration franco-allemande" (Franco-German collaboration).

During his meetings, Massigli let the Germans know of the deep divisions between the "Big Three" at the Paris Peace Conference, namely Woodrow Wilson, David Lloyd George and Georges Clemenceau. Speaking on behalf of the French government, Massigli informed the Germans that the French considered the "Anglo-Saxon powers", the United States and the British Empire, to be the real postwar threat to France; argued that both France and Germany had a common interest in opposing "Anglo-Saxon domination" of the world and warned that the "deepening of opposition" between the French and the Germans "would lead to the ruin of both countries, to the advantage of the Anglo-Saxon powers". The French overtures to the Germans were rejected because the Germans regarded the French offers to be a trap to trick them into accepting the treaty "as is" and because the German foreign minister, Count Ulrich von Brockdorff-Rantzau thought that the United States was more likely to soften the peace terms than France.

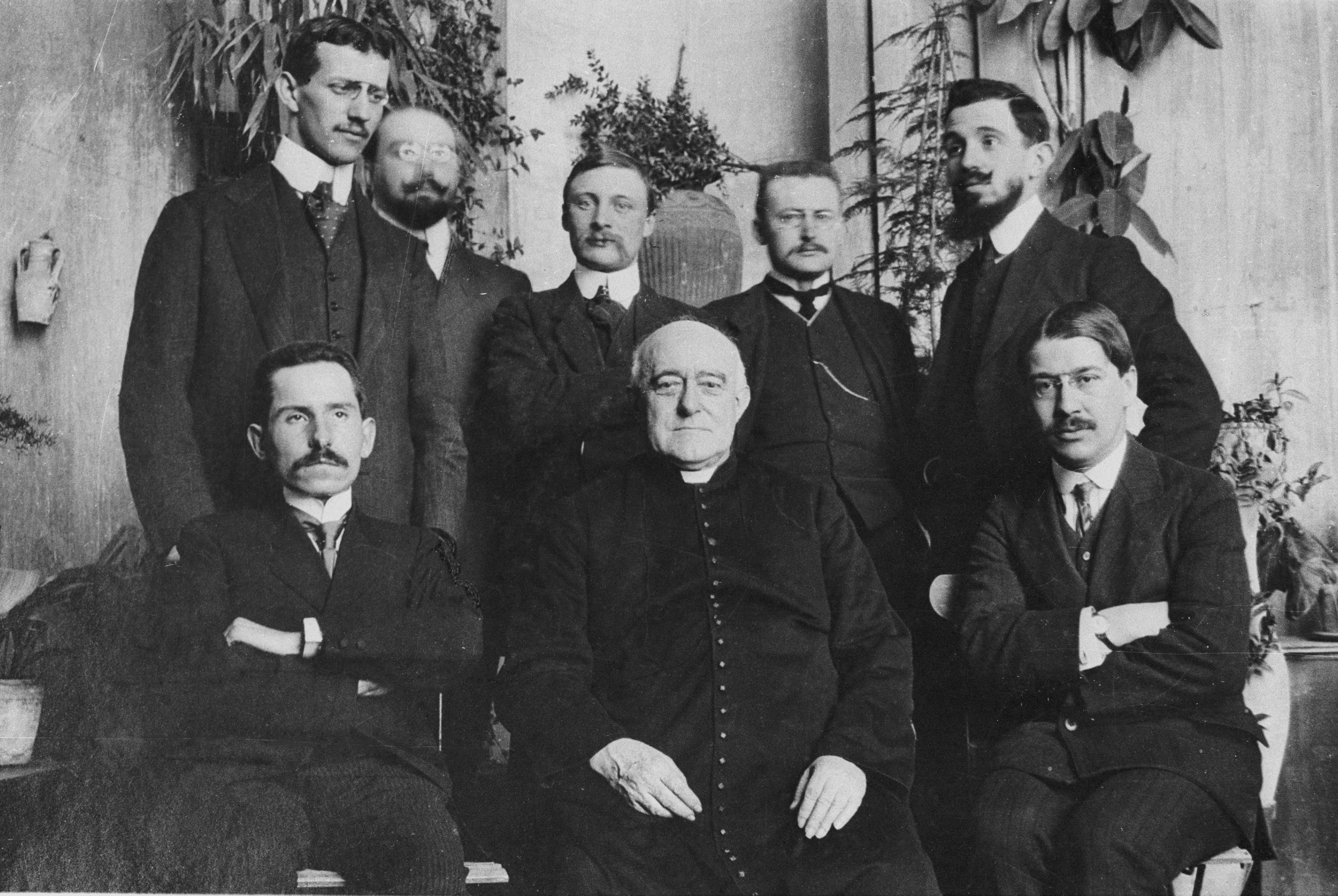
Monsignor Duchesne in the centre with his students in Rome in this photo from 1911 or 1912. René Massigli is the man in the second row at the left.

Massigli was a leading member of the "Protestant clan" that dominated the Quai d'Orsay. Other members of the "Protestant clan" included Robert Coulondre, Victor de Lacroix, Albert Kamerer, Jacques Seydoux and his son François Seydoux de Clausonne, all of whom worked closely together. Because French Protestants were persecuted under the ancien régime during which the state religion was Roman Catholicism, they tended to be very supportive of the legacy of the French Revolution, with its call for Liberté, Égalité, Fraternité. The "Protestant clan" in the Quai d'Orsay were all supporters of the republic and its values of Liberté, Égalité, Fraternité in domestic affairs and a rule-based international order and support for the League of Nations.

== Conference of Ambassadors ==
Massigli served as the secretary-general for the Conference of Ambassadors between 1920 and 1931 before he became the head of the Quai d'Orsay's section dealing with the League of Nations. Using a pseudonym, Massigli wrote an article in L'Ere Nouvelle newspaper in March 1920 in which condemned "the revival of militarism" in Germany, as represented by the Kapp Putsch and predicted that the Reichswehr would never accept democracy but claimed that there was a genuine desire for democracy among the German people. In another series of articles published in June 1920, Massigli articulated what he regarded as the central dilemma of France's German policy: to insist upon a too forceful enforcement of Versailles would undermine German moderates, but at the same time, enemies of democracy were strong in Germany, German democracy might fail even if the treaty were revised and so loosening Versailles would make the task of any potential antidemocratic government in Germany easier.

During his time at the Conference of Ambassadors, Massigli was closely involved in the disputes about Upper Silesia, the Memelland, the Vilnius/Wilno dispute, the borders of Austria and Hungary and the enforcement of Part V of the Treaty of Versailles (which dealt with disarmament). In the early 1920s, Massigli was known for his vigorous efforts to enforce Part V and attempted to thwart German efforts to violate it. In Massigli's view, the French should be moderate in the enforcement of Versailles, but in return, the Germans must obey all of the articles of Versailles, especially Part V. As Massigli wrote, "The touchstone for Germany is the execution of the Treaty, or at least, since I am prepared to believe that certain of its clauses cannot be applied, to give evidence of goodwill in its execution. The starting point must be the disarmament of the Reichswehr". In September 1923, during the Ruhr crisis, Massigli was sent to the Rhineland to report to Paris on the viability of the Rhenish separatist movement, and what support, if any, France should offer the separatists. Massigli was very cool in his assessment of the Rhenish separatists, whom he described as badly organised and lacking in popular support and advised against support for a Rhenish Republic.

Starting in the mid-1920s, Massigli came to relax his views and started to advocate reconciliation with Germany but not at the expense of French security. In 1925, Massigli played a major role in the negotiations that led to the Treaty of Locarno. Though welcoming Gustav Stresemann's initiative in renouncing claims upon Alsace-Lorraine as a very important step for peace, Massigli was privately troubled by the refusal of the Germans to give similar guarantees for their neighbours in Eastern Europe, especially Poland, or to abide by the terms of Part V. A close friend and associate of Aristide Briand, Massigli worked strongly in the late 1920s for Franco-German détente. However, Massigli never lost any of his concerns about the Reichswehr and felt that Franco-German rapprochement should best take place within the broader framework of European integration and collective security. As Massigli later told historian Georges-Henri Soutou, "Briandism had the great merit of drawing a good number of European states towards the French viewpoint". In accordance with his views, Massigli played a major role in working behind the scenes in talks, which led to Germany joining the League of Nations as a Council permanent member in 1926. Massigli was open to revising Versailles within Germany's favour but only within the context of multilateral organisations like the League of Nations.

Briand's policy of rapprochement with Germany caused much worry in Poland, which was openly concerned about the prospect of a better Franco-German relations would mean that France would abandon them, especially with Stresemann utterly refusing to sign any "Eastern Locarno" that would see Germany accept the current frontiers with Poland. In 1927, the Polish ambassador in Paris, Alfred Chłapowski, submitted a lengthy note complaining that the French were considering an early evacuation of the Rhineland without consulting Warsaw and asking Briand to make an "Eastern Locarno" a precondition of any French evacuation of the Rhineland. Through the Polish note caused much irritation in Paris, Massigli stated that on a legal basis, the Polish position was faulty, but on a political basis, it was not. Massigli wrote that the French occupation of the Rhineland, "to a certain extent," protected the Poles, as it made impossible for Germany to attack Poland, and he felt France should indeed demand Germany to sign an "Eastern Locarno" as the price for an early evacuation of the Rhineland. However, Stresemann's offer of a better Franco-German relations, especially in the economic sphere, together with the total German unwillingness to accept the frontiers with Poland, led Briand to decide to ignore the Polish concerns.

On 16 September 1928, after lengthy Franco-British-American-German talks it was agreed that a committee of economic experts would discuss a new reparations plan for Germany that came to be known as the Young Plan, and France would withdraw its soldiers from the Rhineland in June 1930, which was five years earlier than scheduled. Massigli in a report wrote, "The Poles are visibly worried"; the agreement made no mention of an "Eastern Locarno". After talking to the Polish foreign minister, August Zaleski, Massigli concluded that Zaleski was well aware that Poland had a "weak hand" as France was its only great-power ally and that as unhappy as the Poles were, they would stick with the French alliance for the lack of any alternative. Massigli added that he had the impression that Zaleski's actions were motivated by the desire to show the Poles that their government was at least trying to end what they considered a double standard that Locarno did not apply to Eastern Europe. In 1929–1930, Massigli worked closely with Briand in his project for creating a European "federation", which many have seen as a prototype for the European Union. From 1929 to 1935, he headed the department of the Quai d'Orsay concerned with the League of Nations, as he believed that collective security provided a means in which France could rally the world against any future German aggression.

== World Disarmament Conference ==
From 1930, Massigli was intimately involved in the preparatory work for the World Disarmament Conference scheduled to open in 1932. The increasing divergence between German demands for Gleichberechtigung ("equality of armaments") (abolishing Part V) and the French demand for sécurité ("security") (maintaining Part V) together with the strains in Franco–German relations imposed by the attempt at an Austrian-German customs project of 1931 left Massigli increasingly disillusioned with the Weimar Republic. In 1931, Massigli advised the Premier Pierre Laval before his summit with the German chancellor, Heinrich Brüning, that France should offer a bailout for the collapsing German bank system only if the Germans were prepared to forgo the demand for Gleichberechtigung at the upcoming World Disarmament Conference. Brüning refused the French conditions at his summit with Laval.

Massigli was a prominent player at the World Disarmament Conference in Geneva and helped to write famous "Barthou note" of 17 April 1934 issued by the foreign minister, Louis Barthou, which helped to terminate the conference. Massigli was especially opposed to the prime minister, Édouard Herriot, who accepted in December 1932 Gleichberechtigung "in principle", as Massigli correctly predicted that it would lead to opening the door for German rearmament.

== Opponent of appeasement ==
In 1932, when Czechoslovak Foreign Minister Edvard Beneš introduced a plan for an economic union embracing Czechoslovakia, Austria, Romania, Yugoslavia, and Hungary, Massigli wrote that Prague alone "had a plan" for dealing with the Great Depression in Eastern Europe. Though the French experts in general preferred to exclude Romania and Yugoslavia from the proposed economic union because of their economic backwardness, Massigli argued for the inclusion of Yugoslavia and Romania as the Little Entente alliance already existed and so had to be "treated with consideration". French Prime Minister André Tardieu embraced Beneš's plan as forming the basis of a fédération danubienne (Danubian federation), which would not only mitigate the effects of the Great Depression but also be a step for peace in Eastern Europe.

In 1933, Massigli was appointed the deputy political director at the French foreign ministry. During the 1930s, Massigli was a leading member of the so-called "Protestant clan", a group of Protestants who held high offices in the Quai d'Orsay. As a diplomat, Massigli was noted for his efficiency and his crisp, lucid writing style. In general, Massigli was identified with as an advocate of "firmness" in dealing with the new German government, and in a note of 11 December 1933, he argued that the main thrust of German policy was to preserve a strong Franco-German relationship in exchange for acceptance of German expansionism into Eastern Europe before Germany turned west for a final showdown with France. Unlike his superior, the Secretary-General of the Quai d'Orsay, Alexis Leger, Massigli was more open to enlisting Italy as an ally against Germany. The French historian Jean-Baptiste Duroselle wrote that Massigli was "one of the stronger personalities at the Quai d'Orsay" and the "main advocate of active resistance to Hitler". Massigli was also a leading advocate of French support for the League of Nations and was constantly on the train going to and from Geneva, the seat of the League of Nations. Massigli, who closely followed German affairs, was on a first-name basis with André François-Poncet, the French ambassador in Berlin between 1931 and 1938. Léon Noël, the French ambassador in Warsaw, praised Massigli as being always "candid and insightful" about European affairs.

Massigli was a prominent player in the World Disarmament Conference in Geneva and helped to write the so-called "Barthou Note" of 17 April 1934 in which French Foreign Minister Louis Barthou announced that France refused to agree to a German rearmament, would no longer play any part in the Conference and would start to ensure its own security with its own resources. In April 1934, Massigli was sent to Prague by Barthou with instructions to try to end the long-running Teschen dispute between Poland and Czechoslovakia, as it was a source of endless frustration in Paris that France's two leading allies in Eastern Europe were feuding with one another over the Teschen region, occupied by Czechoslovakia and claimed by Poland. Beneš told him that the existence of the Little Entente was being threatened by Poland, and he accused the Poles of "tending to deflect German expansion towards the Danube basin" and that because of the German-Polish Nonaggression Pact, "Poland was acting contrary if not to the letter, at least the spirit of the Franco-Polish alliance". Barthou agreed to visit Warsaw later that month with the aim of mediating the Teschen dispute, as it was commonly agreed within the Quai d'Orsay that as long as Poland and Czechoslovakia were feuding with each other, only Germany was gaining.

On 9–10 July 1934, Massigli went with Barthou to London to answer British objections to French plans for an Eastern Locarno pact to guarantee the existing borders in Eastern Europe, which was really a disguised way of bringing about a Franco-Soviet alliance in a manner that would not offend British public opinion too much. During the talks, Barthou, known as one of the "tough guys" of French politics, refused to yield to any of the objections made by the Foreign Secretary, Sir John Simon, and the League of Nations minister, Sir Anthony Eden, to the Eastern Locarno pact. As Simon disliked going to Geneva to attend sessions of the League of Nations, he created a junior foreign minister portfolio to handle relations with the League headed by Eden. As the French delegation refused to yield to the British objections for an "Eastern Locarno" pact with Barthou, and Massigli pointed out that since France was allied to Poland and Czechoslovakia, that having Germany recognise its eastern borders would prevent a world war, both Simon and Eden yielded.

An attempt to tie acceptance of an "Eastern Locarno" pact to a French return to the World Disarmament Conference, on the grounds that it would lead to difficult questions in the House of Commons, led Barthou to retort that he did not care. A member of the French delegation noted that his British hosts respected Barthou's toughness and were treating the French with more respect than usual. However, the German government was noncommittal about the French offer to sign an "Eastern Locarno" pact, and the Polish government, whose relations with the Reich had greatly improved since the signing of the Nonaggression Pact in January 1934, made a show of "exaggerated diplomatic procrastination" about joining an "Eastern Locarno" pact. In September 1934, Barthou decided to open talks with the Soviet Union and Italy for alliances against Germany, and along the same lines, he invited King Alexander of Yugoslavia to visit France for talks about joining the proposed alliance system against the Reich. On 9 October 1934, when Alexander arrived in Marseilles, both he and Barthou were assassinated. Massigli later commented that with Barthou's assassination, France lost the only foreign minister tough enough and capable enough to pursue a foreign policy meant to "contain" Germany.

During the crisis caused in March 1936 by the German remilitarisation of the Rhineland, Massigli urged for Paris use the crisis as a way of strengthening French ties with Britain, Belgium and the League of Nations. Massigli especially hoped to use the Rhineland crisis as a way of securing the British "continental commitment", an unequivocal British commitment to defend France via an expeditionary force of the same size as the British Expeditionary Force of the First World War. After meeting with the British Foreign Secretary, Eden, in London in March 1936, Massigli was angry with what he regarded as the feeble British response to the Rhineland remilitarisation. Massigli regarded the vague British promise to come to France's aid in the event of a German attack, coupled with staff talks of very limited scope, as most unsatisfactory substitutes for the "continental commitment". On 17 March 1936, Massigli expressed his worries about the possible consequences of the Rhineland crisis when he complained to General Victor-Henri Schweisguth the concept of international co-operation was collapsing in the face of the German move into the Rhineland, that the League of Nations was losing all of its moral authority and that "if all this isn't repaired immediately, we stand on the verge of a complete change in policy and a return to continental alliances". At least in that respect, there was least some hope of maintaining good Anglo-French relations, which led Massigli to see at least a silver lining in the Rhineland crisis. In 1937, he was promoted the Political Director of the Quai d'Orsay upon the recommendation of Alexis Leger.

During the crisis in 1938 over Czechoslovakia, Massigli was not in sympathy with his government's policy, and in private, he deplored the Munich Agreement as a disaster to France. Throughout the 1938 crisis, the differing views held by the arch-appeaser Foreign Minister Georges Bonnet and anti-appeaser Massigli caused immense tension, and Bonnet constantly disparaged him as a "warmonger". On 29 March 1938, Massigli argued in a memo that French economic support for Czechoslovakia was urgently needed to prevent what he called the "economic strangulation" of Czechoslovakia, as the Anschluss had eliminated Austria, and Romania, Hungary and Yugoslavia were rapidly falling under German economic domination. Massigli warned that with the economies of the countries around Czechoslovakia all coming under German economic control directly or indirectly, the ability of Czechoslovakia to withstand a German assault was weakening by the day. He especially wanted economic support for Czechoslovakia as President Beneš was the Eastern European leader most committed to upholding his country's alliance with France, as Massigli noted he had serious doubts about the commitment of Colonel Józef Beck, the foreign minister of Poland; Milan Stojadinović, the prime minister of Yugoslavia and Carol II, the king of Romania, to upholding their nations' alliances with France.

Massigli feared that if Germany won control of Eastern Europe with its vast natural resources, the French guerre de longue durée (long-lasting war) strategy, based upon the assumption that Germany would be blockaded and cut off from the raw materials necessary for a modern industrial war, would be fatally undermined. Massigli noted that Czechoslovakia had the world's seventh-largest economy; its western part was highly modernised and industrialised (the eastern part was very backward and poor); and if the western part came under German control, its factories and raw materials would be used to support Germany against France.

In August 1938, Massigli argued to the British chargé d'affaires, Campbell, what he saw as the significance of Czechoslovakia as way of blocking German expansion into Eastern Europe. However, Massigli felt given various economic and strategic concerns, France could not go to war over Czechoslovakia without British support, and if that support did not materialise, the French would be best to explain the strategic state of affairs "frankly" to Prague. Massigli felt that in the event of a German attack, France should not automatically declare war, as the Franco-Czechoslovak alliance of 1924 required, but present the hypothetical German-Czechoslovak war to the League of Nations Council and then wait until it decided if the war was a case of aggression or not. Massigli saw the Czechoslovak crisis as a way of strengthening Anglo-French ties, and on 17 September 1938, Massigli wrote a memorandum that stated:

"If the British Government pushes us along the path of surrender, it must consider the resulting weakness of French security, which on numerous occasions, has been declared inseparable from British security. To what extent might a reinforcement of the ties of Franco-British collaboration compensate for this weakening in the common interests of the two countries? This is a matter to which the attention of the British leaders should be drawn".

In the same memo, Massigli noted the multiethnic nature of Czechoslovakia, with its mixture of Czechs, Slovaks, Poles, Germans, Magyars and Ukrainians was a weakness, as most of the German, Magyar and Polish minorities were not loyal to Czechoslovakia and concentrated on the borderlands of Czechoslovakia. He expressed some doubts about the long-term viability of Czechoslovakia and noted that if a plebiscite was held in the Sudetenland, most Sudeten Germans would vote to join Germany, which would likewise lead the Polish, Magyar and maybe even the Slovak minorities to demand plebiscites. Massigli argued if it came to war, the Czechoslovak Army would defend the Sudetenland, where fighting had already broken out between the Sudeten Freikorps and the Czechoslovak Army. Remembering how German atrocities in Belgium in 1914, the so-called "Rape of Belgium", did so much to turn American public opinion against Germany, Massigli expressed some concern if the Czechoslovak Army had to defend the Sudetenland, maybe that might lead to atrocities, which would cost the Allies the moral high ground and give Britain an excuse to declare neutrality.

Massigli argued that rather than risk a defense of the Sudetenland, whose people clearly did not want to be part of Czechoslovakia, it might be better to let the Sudetenland "go home to the Reich" and fight a war in defense of the ethnic Czech areas of Czechoslovakia. Though not willing to see Czechoslovakia subordinated to Germany, Massigli felt that letting the Sudetenland join Germany might stabilise Czechoslovakia's politics and give the Allies the moral high ground if came to war, as the Allies would be defending the rights of Czechs to maintain their independence, instead of fighting a war to keep the German-speaking Sudetenland against its will within Czechoslovakia.

However, Massigli was countered by Marshal Maurice Gamelin, who stated that Hitler was likely to demand the entire Sudetenland, rather just parts of it, and that without the mountainous Sudetenland, Czechoslovakia was militarily indefensible. On 29 September 1938, Massigli followed Prime Minister Édouard Daladier to Munich as part of the French delegation, and upon his return to Paris, witnessing the vast cheering crowds, he wrote in a letter, "Poor people, I am overwhelmed with shame". After the Munich Agreement, Massigli wrote in a memo, "Far from bringing Germany back to a policy of co-operation, the success of her method can only encourage her to persevere in it. The enormous sacrifice conceded by the Western powers will have no counterpart: once more we will be reduced to an act of faith in the peaceful evolution of the new Pangermanism".

== Ambassador to Turkey ==
Relations between Massigli and his superior in 1938, Foreign Minister Georges Bonnet, were very poor, and in his memoirs, Bonnet lambasted Massigli quite severely. For his part, Massigli accused Bonnet of seeking to alter the documentary record in his favour. On 19 October 1938, Massigli was sacked as political director by Bonnet, who exiled him to Turkey as ambassador. An Anglophile, Massigli's removal meant a weakening of those officials in the Quai d'Orsay who favoured closer ties to Britain.

During his time in Ankara, Massigli played an important role in ensuring that the Hatay dispute was resolved in Turkey's favour. Massagli felt that the best way of ensuring a pro-Western tilt in Turkey was to accede to the Turkish demands for the sanjak of Alexandretta (modern İskenderun) in Syria. During his talks with the Turkish foreign minister, Şükrü Saracoğlu, Massigli was hindered by the continual poor state of his relations with Bonnet. In addition, Massigli faced much opposition from Arab nationalists and the French High Commission in Syria, who were both opposed to ceding the sanjak of Alexandretta. When the talks over Hatay began in February 1939, Massagli went for weeks without negotiating instructions by Bonnet, and thus was only able to complete the Hatay negotiations on 23 June 1939. Though Massigli was appalled by the Turkish chantage (blackmail) of concentrating troops on the Turkish-Syrian frontier and sending raiders over the border as a way of pressuring the French into handing over Alexandretta, he felt that it was better to turn over Alexandretta as a way of winning over Turkey and allowing France to focus on opposing Germany.

Massigli argued to his superiors in Paris that it was Germany, not Turkey, that was the major danger to France and that having a large number of French troops in Syria to guard against a Turkish attack was simply an unneeded distraction. Moreover, Massigli maintained that if France did not return Alexandretta and a Franco-German war broke out, Turkey would probably invade Syria to take back Alexandretta. However, Massigli continued, if France did return Alexandretta, Turkey would maintain a pro-Allied neutrality or perhaps even fight for the Allies. During his talks with the Turks, Massigli was often attacked by les Syriens (the Syrians), an influential Roman Catholic lobbying group that believed strongly in France's mission civilisatrice (civilising mission) in the Middle East and stoutly opposed giving up Alexandretta as a betrayal of France's mission civilisatrice. Most of les Syriens were Anglophobes and saw Britain, rather than Germany, as the main enemy of France. Massigli held les Syriens in contempt and argued that France could not be distracted by adventures in the Middle East when Germany was on the march. In March 1939, Massigli visited the headquarters of the French High Commission in Beirut and bluntly stated that Turkey was not, as the High Commission was claiming, seeking to annex all of Syria but was seeking only Alexandretta. He stated that fears of an aggressive Turkey, seeking to revive the Ottoman Empire, were not founded in reality. Massigli was able, during his talks with the Turks, to persuade his hosts to stop sending irregulars over the Turkish-Syrian frontier and attacking French troops. During his negotiations with Saracoğlu, the Turks suggested a ten-year alliance of Turkey, Britain and France in exchange for the French handing over Alexandretta. When the Turkish offer became public, it provoked a major outcry from les Syriens.

On 24 March 1939, Saracoğlu told Massigli that Britain and France should do more to oppose German influence in the Balkans, which was followed on 29 March by an offer of a Franco-Turkish alliance that would go into effect if the British also joined. In April 1939, the deputy Soviet Foreign Commissar Vladimir Potemkin during a visit to Turkey told Massigli that the aim of Soviet foreign policy was to bring into line a "peace front" to oppose German expansionism comprising Britain, France, the Soviet Union and Turkey. In 1939, Massigli was heavily preoccupied with competition with the German ambassador, Franz von Papen, in an effort to secure Turkish adherence to the Allied side in the event of war breaking out. As part of the effort to increase French influence on the Turkish government, Massigli arranged for the visit of General Maxime Weygand to Turkey in early May 1939, which was made into a state event. To counter what he called the "oily charm" of Papen, Massigli felt that having a distinguished French general visit Turkey would appeal to the ego of Turkish President İsmet İnönü and guessed correctly that the crusty old soldier Weygand would bond with another crusty old soldier, İnönü. İnönü was fluent in French and so the fact that neither Weygand nor Massigli spoke Turkish was no problem.

During Weygand's visit, President İnönü told the French that he feared that Germany was out to dominate the world; that he believed that the best way of stopping Germany was an alliance of Turkey, the Soviet Union, France and Britain; that if such an alliance, known as the "peace front", came into being, the Turks would allow Soviet ground and air forces onto their soil; and that he wanted a major programme of French military aid to modernise the Turkish armed forces. Massigli was most disappointed when the British sent a mere brigadier, instead of an admiral, to offer military aid to the Turks. Massigli remarked sorely, "The Turks respect the Royal Navy; they no longer believe in the British Army." In July 1939 Massigli argued that if the British and French were able to offer a stabilisation fund for the Turkish pound, it would undercut German economic influence in Turkey and tie Turkey to the West. Later in July 1939, Massigli was able to play a major part in arranging for French arms shipments to Turkey. In August 1939, he helped arrange an Anglo-French stabilisation fund created to help with Turkey's economic problems. The signing of the Molotov–Ribbentrop Pact on 23 August 1939 undid much of Massigli's strategy, as the Turks believed that it was essential to have the Soviet Union as an ally to counter Germany and that the pact undercut completely the assumptions behind Turkish security policy.

Though Massigli was often hampered by his poor relations with Bonnet, the efforts of les Syriens and the stingy attitude of the French Treasury towards supporting Turkey, British historian D.C. Watt argues that Massigli was an outstandingly able ambassador who helped French interests in Turkey in 1939.

== Second World War ==
In October 1939, the furious rivalry between Massigli and von Papen finally ended with the conclusion of a mutual security pact between the United Kingdom, France and Turkey. However, as Massigli admitted in his memoir of time as ambassador in Ankara, La Turquie devant la Guerre, his triumph proved to be an ephemeral one as the Turks chose to interpret Clause Two of the Anglo-French-Turkish alliance in such way as justifying remaining neutral. However, Massigli contended that while he failed to bring Turkey into the war on the Allied state, he at least foiled von Papen's efforts to bring Turkey into the war on the Axis side. In February 1940, in a dispatch to the German Foreign Minister, Joachim von Ribbentrop, Papen wrote that based on information he had received from "two friends" in the Turkish government that it was commonly gossiped in Ankara that Massigli is "said to have told his friends repeatedly that Turkey would be in the war by May at the latest".

In the winter of 1939-40, Massigli was involved in the plans for Operation Pike, an Anglo-French plan to bomb the Soviet oil facilities in Baku using air bases in Turkey. After the Ribbentrop-Molotov pact of 26 August 1939, the Soviet Union had become the largest supplier of oil to Germany, which had no oil of its own. On 15 March 1940, Massigli told Sir Hughe Knatchbull-Hugessen that he heard from Paul-Émile Naggiar, the French ambassador to the Soviet Union, that "the Russians are in a great panic about the possible bombardment of Baku from the air and asked for American advice as to what exactly would happen in such an event and how the great the damage would be". Massigli concluded that Naggiar had learned from American oil engineers that "as a result of the manner in which the oil fields have been exploited, the earth is so saturated with oil that fire could spread immediately to the entire neighboring region; it would be months before it could be extinguished and years before work could be resumed again". When Massigli asked the Turkish Foreign Minister, Şükrü Saracoğlu, what would be the Turkish reaction if British and French planes crossed Turkish and/or Iranian air space to bomb Baku, the latter replied, "Alors vous craignez une protestation de l'Iran" (So you fear a protest of Iran). In April 1940, Massigli in a dispatch to Paris recommended that British and French planes based in Syria and Iraq should starting bombing Baku, and at the same time issue a formal apology to Turkey for violating Turkish air place, which would allow the Turks to pretend that they had not given permission for the raids. After the Wehrmacht captured Paris on 14 June 1940, the files of the Quai d'Orsay fell into German hands. In the summer of 1940, the Germans published all of the French documents relating to Operation Pike and so Massigli's dispatches urging the Allies bomb Baku became public, making him briefly the center of international attention.

In August 1940, Massigli was removed by the Vichy government as Ambassador to Turkey. On 5 August 1940, Massigli left the French Embassy in Ankara for the last time with what was described as a "large and very sympathetic" crowd of ordinary Turks to see him off as he was popular in Turkey for his role in helping to resolve the Alexandretta dispute. Knatchbull-Hugessen, who was a close friend of Massigli, was furious with Papen for his sacking, writing in London that it was no secret in Ankara that Papen had asked Ribbentrop (with whom he had served in the Ottoman Empire in 1917-18) to pressure the Vichy government to fire him. Knatchbull-Hugessen stated he now had one more reason to hate Papen, writing, "Words fail me as to the part played by Papen in this". Churchill called the Anglophile Massigli "half English and wholly French" and stated one of Britain's best friends in the French government was now unemployed.

After his firing, Massigli returned to France, where he was involved in several "study groups" of former diplomats set up to oppose the German occupation and was in contact with several Resistance leaders in the Lyon area, most notably Jean Moulin. In November 1942, when Germany occupied the unoccupied zone in southern France, the SS Hauptsturmführer Klaus Barbie, Gestapo chief of Lyon, issued an order for his arrest, forcing Massigli to go underground. In January 1943, Massigli was retrieved from France and came to London to serve as Charles de Gaulle's Commissioner for Foreign Affairs.

He acted, in effect, as the Free French foreign minister from 1943 to 1944. As foreign minister, Massigli served as a calming influence as he found himself dealing with the often tempestuous relationship between de Gaulle vs. British Prime Minister Winston Churchill and U.S. President Franklin D. Roosevelt. Immediately afterwards, Massigli was at the eye of a storm in an Anglo-French crisis when Churchill tried to stop de Gaulle from visiting the Middle East under the grounds that would make trouble for the British. Massigli did his best to persuade de Gaulle not to visit Algeria, but when the general learned that he was confined to Britain, he shouted at Massigli, "Alors, je suis prisonnier!" (So I am a prisoner!) Massigi did his best to defuse the crisis and the British diplomat Charles Peake reported after talking to Massigli:

"He [Massigli] thought that... General de Gaulle would himself want to leave for Algiers about the 31st March. Mr. Massigli then asked me whether the Prime Minister would receive the General before the latter left. I said that if Mr. Massigil was making a request for this, I would certainly put it forward, but that I did not think it likely that the Prime Minister would feel able to accede... the reason lay in the record of General de Gaulle's own behavior.

Mr. Massigli said he did not contest that General de Gaulle was an unusually difficult and unsatisfactory man with whom to do business, but, speaking to me as a friend, he begged me to use my best endeavors to persuade the Prime Minister to see the General before he left. It was of course true that General de Gaulle had been built up by the British government, but the fact remained that he had been built up, and he thought that, on any objective consideration, it would be agreed that his position in metropolitan France was paramount, and that the tendency was for it to become so elsewhere. He felt it right, speaking personally and very confidentially, to warn me of the dangers which must inevitably lie ahead if General de Gaulle should go to North Africa feeling that the Prime Minister's face was turned against him... and it was surely therefore of real advantage, purely as a matter of policy, that the Prime Minister should say a kind word to him before he left. One of General de Gaulle's limitations, as I would know well, was that he was apt to nurse a grievance and to brood over fancied wrongs. Would it not be wise, in the interests of Anglo-French relations, to remove any pretext for his doing so? The Prime Minister was so great a figure and so magnanimous that he believed that if this appeal were conveyed to him, he would not be deaf to it. Moreover, General de Gaulle cherished a deep-seated admiration for the Prime Minister and, he was sure, would respond to a kind word from him".

On 30 March, Churchill agreed to meet de Gaulle, but only to learn that de Gaulle had not requested a meeting as Massigli was acting on his own in trying to set up a Churchill-de Gaulle summit.

Finally in the presence of Massigli and Sir Alexander Cadogan, the Permanent Undersecretary at the Foreign Office, the Prime Minister and the General met on 2 April 1943. Despite all of the bad blood between Churchill and de Gaulle, the meeting was friendly, with Churchill agreeing that de Gaulle would go to Algeria after all. The meeting ended with Churchill saying he "was convinced that a strong France was in the interests of Europe, and especially of England... The Prime Minister was a European, a good European—at least he hoped so—and a strong France was an indispensable element in his conception of Europe. The General could rely on these assurances, whatever unpleasant incidents might occur. It was a principle of English policy...which corresponded to the interests of France, of Great Britain, and also of the United States. The Prime Minister again asked the General to rely on this declaration, and to remember it in times of difficulty".

When de Gaulle finally arrived in Algiers on 30 May 1943, Massigli followed him to assist de Gaulle in his struggle against the rival faction for the leadership of the Free French, led by General Henri Giraud. Giraud was backed by the United States, which preferred him as the leader of the Free French to de Gaulle, causing much tension with the United States. On 3 June 1943 in Algiers, the French Committee of National Liberation was created with a careful balance between the followers of Giraud and de Gaulle; Massigli was a founding member of the committee who belonged to the Gaullist faction, which led the Giraudists to try unsuccessfully to push out him. In 1943, Massigli opposed the visit of the Prime Minister of Iraq, Nuri as-Said Pasha to Algeria after a summit with the Prime Minister of Egypt, Mustafa el-Nahhas Pasha, on the grounds that such visit would encourage Arab nationalist sentiment in French North Africa, would give the impression that France was aligning itself with the Iraqi fraction centred around as-Said Pasha and might weaken the electoral chances of pro-French Lebanese nationalists in the upcoming Lebanese elections. In November 1943, Massigli was appointed the French delegate to the Allied Control Commission for Italy. In January 1944, at the conference called by General de Gaulle to consider the post-war fate of the French African colonies in Brazzaville in the French Congo, Massigli strongly urged that representatives from the protectorates of Tunisia and Morocco and the government of Algeria not be allowed to attend the conference. Massigli's advice was not ignored.

In the spring of 1944, Massigli on the behalf of General de Gaulle presented an offer to Prime Minister Winston Churchill and Foreign Secretary Sir Anthony Eden for a "Third Force" in the postwar world standing between the Soviet Union and the United States that was to comprise the United Kingdom, France and Belgium, which to integrate their defence and economic policies and jointly control the western half of Germany. The British were not initially interested in the proposal, while de Gaulle was always cool to the idea of British involvement in the "Third Force" concept, and had only agreed to British participation to allay Belgian concerns about post-war French domination. Moreover, de Gaulle had imposed as a precondition for British participation that London should support France annexing the Ruhr and Rhineland regions of Germany after the war, a demand the British rejected. In 1944, Massigli came into conflict with Gaston Palewski, de Gaulle's right-hand man, as Massigli wanted to report directly to General de Gaulle, a privilege that Palewski sought to eliminate.

As foreign minister, Massigli was involved in drawing up plans in the spring of 1944 to purge the Quai d'Orsay of Vichy supporters and of allowing those who served in the Resistance to join the Quai d'Orsay. In the summer of 1944, French Communist members of the Consultative Assembly attacked him as an anti-Soviet, accusing Massigli (correctly) of opposing de Gaulle's plans for an alliance with the Soviet Union and of preferring an alliance with Britain instead. After Pierre Viénot, who served as the de facto ambassador to Britain, died in July 1944, Massigli expressed the wish to Eden to take over his position, saying he was not a political man and was uncomfortable with the hostile questions in the Consultative Assembly and with quarreling with Palewski. Massigli had an excellent working relationships with Eden, his private secretary Sir Oliver Harvey, and with Alfred Duff Cooper who served as the de facto British ambassador to the Free French, and felt he might serve France better by working in London.

In 1944, de Gaulle decided that the Anglophile Massigli was too pro-British for his liking and demoted him to Ambassador to London. From August 1944 until June 1954, Massigli was the French Ambassador to the Court of St. James's. Massigli himself welcomed the demotion, saying he would be happier in London than in Paris. When Massigli arrived in London, he was unable to present his credentials to King George VI at Buckingham Palace owing to the ambiguity about whether the Committee of National Liberation was the government of France. Eden wanted to recognise de Gaulle's government, but the Americans maintained an "anybody but de Gaulle" attitude, and Churchill was unwilling to antagonise Roosevelt over the issue. In a note to Eden, Massigli wrote that the French view on Britain's unwillingness to extend full diplomatic recognition would change from "bewilderment to one of irritation". In August 1944, Massigli lobbied Winston Churchill for allowing a greater French role in the war in the Far East as the best way of ensuring that French Indochina stay French after World War II had ended. In October 1944, Britain finally gave de Gaulle's government full recognition as Massigli argued that the continuing refusal was damaging Britain's image in France, to be followed by the United States a month later. After achieving full recognition, Massigli wanted an Anglo-French alliance as he disapproved of the alliance that de Gaulle was negotiating with the Soviet Union, which he was to sign in Moscow in December 1944. In November 1944, when Churchill visited Paris, he presented to de Gaulle his offer for an Anglo-French pact, which Massigli urged the General to accept, but which de Gaulle refused.

== Cold War ==
During his time in Britain, Massigli was very involved in the debates about the Cold War and European integration. Massigli believed that persistent Anglo-French misunderstandings during the interwar period had led to the "great disaster of 1940", and he saw it as his mission to prevent new misunderstandings in the postwar world. One principal misunderstanding was the widespread belief in Britain that it was not a European power and could disengage from Continental European affairs. Massigli was strongly opposed to the vision of European federation of Jean Monnet but urged the creation of an Anglo-French bloc, which would be the dominant power in Europe. Massigli's wartime experiences left him with a distrust of the United States and a belief that only close Anglo-French co-operation would provide the basis of peace in Europe. He did not favor neutrality in the Cold War but felt that both British and French interests were best served by working closely together and keeping a certain distance from the United States. Because of his work with de Gaulle during the war, Massigli was considered to be one of "the General's men" at the Quai d'Orsay.

The victory of the Labour Party in the 1945 election and the replacement of Sir Anthony Eden with Ernest Bevin as Foreign Secretary did not presage any great difficulties in Anglo-French relations in Massigli's view. Bevin was supportive of Massigli's idea of an Anglo-French military alliance, but de Gaulle was not, and the strength of the French Communist Party in the National Assembly made it unclear if an Anglo-French alliance, which would be implicitly directed against the Soviet Union, could be ratified by the National Assembly. De Gaulle wanted to detach the Ruhr region of Germany to turn it into a French puppet state, a plan that the British were opposed to. Since the Ruhr was in the British occupation zone, the British opposition to dividing Germany placed a major strain on Anglo-French relations. Bevin told Massigli that he wanted the Ruhr to stay within Germany and warned him that he did not want to oppose France at any future international conferences. The fact that Bevin placed more value on rebuilding Germany economically than he did to French fears of a revived Germany caused Massigli to reassess his views about an alliance with Britain and caused many difficulties with Bevin. At a conference to decide the future of Germany, French Foreign Minister Georges Bidault advocated severing the Ruhr from the rest of Germany, a request that Bevin rejected. Massigli handed in a diplomatic note to Bevin stating France's "sorrow" at Britain's attitude that German interests took precedence over French interests. An angry Bevin snapped that France was supporting returning Libya to Italy with no thought for the "40,000 British dead" who were killed in North Africa, and that stated that there would be no Anglo-French alliance until the French accepted that the Ruhr would remain part of Germany. In response, Massigli warned of the "incalculable consequences" for domestic stability in France if Britain continued to put German interests ahead of French interests, saying that would cause many French people to turn to the communists.

The deadlock on an Anglo-French alliance was broken when the British ambassador in Paris, Alfred Duff Cooper, acting on his own proposed an alliance to the French premier Léon Blum in January 1947. Despite his doubts about Britain by this time, Massigli approved when Blum arrived in London to take up Duff Cooper's offer, which the British were too embarrassed to admit was something that he done without orders and led to the Treaty of Dunkirk on 4 March. After the treaty was signed, Britain and France invited Belgium, the Netherlands and Luxembourg to join, which led to the Treaty of Brussels in March 1948. Massigli's hopes that these treaties would orient Britain towards Europe and away from the United States were dashed. Sir Ivone Kirkpatrick told Massigli that the British felt that the immediate danger was the Soviet Union, not Germany, and that it was necessary for the states of Western Europe to co-ordinate their defense and foreign policies with the United States, even if the American views about rebuilding Germany as a great power were often unpalatable to the French. Bidault, in his instructions to Massigli, stated that France was opposed to any form of German rearmament. For his part, Massigli reported to Paris that the recurring crises of the Fourth Republic damaged France's credibility in London as even British officials normally Francophile were worried about the state of France. Despite the best efforts of Oliver Harvey, the British ambassador in Paris, the general feeling in Whitehall was that France was a declining power marked by unstable politics and what one British official called a "petulant approach to European and especially German problems" as the British were far more in favor of the rehabilitation of Germany than the French.

During the Cold War crisis in 1948-1949 caused by the "Velvet coup" in Czechoslovakia and the Berlin Blockade, Bevin told Massigli that he wanted a common Western European defence pact together with an "Atlantic pact" that would bring in the United States. Bevin expressed much doubt about what France could bring to the proposed Western European defense pact, warned that Britain was very worried about France's domestic stability and expressed concerns that the French communists could come to power in the near future. For Massigli, the principal problem in Anglo-French relations was that he found Bevin rather tone-deaf about French fears of Germany and that he viewed the Soviet Union as the major threat and was quite willing to see a Western German state created to serve as an ally against the Soviets. At a meeting with Sir William Strang, Massigli was able to get assurances that Britain was opposed to German rearmament, but Strang also stated that the Americans did not feel the same way on the "German question" and he was not certain that Britain were willing to risk a major clash with the Americans over the issue for the sake of France. Much of Massigli's annoyance fell on the politicians in Paris, and he complained that they were repeating the same mistakes of the 1920s towards Germany, alternating between the "soft" policies of Aristide Briand and the "hard" policies of Raymond Poincaré, without getting the advantage of either. Massigli argued that the British would take the French much more seriously if only France pursued a consistent policy towards Germany.

In May 1950, a decisive moment in European history occurred when Jean Monnet, director of the Commissariat du Plan that oversaw France's economic recovery from the damages of World War II proposed a High Authority that would oversee a union of the coal and steel industries of France and West Germany. Monnet convinced the French Foreign Minister Robert Schuman of the political-economic advantages of this plan, and because the plan first become public when Schuman announced it at a foreign ministers' conference in London, it became known as the "Schuman Plan". The "Schuman Plan" led to the European Coal and Steel Community of 1951, the European Economic Community in 1957 and the European Union in 1993. Massigli was completely opposed to the "Schuman Plan" because it ended his hopes of an Anglo-French bloc, instead of a Franco-German bloc, as the core of an economic association of western European states. Massigli's attempts to persuade Bevin to join the planned European Coal and Steel Community in the spring of 1950, which he desperately wanted as he very much wanted Britain to counterbalance West Germany, failed as Bevin saw the "Schuman Plan" as a loss of British sovereignty. Reluctantly, Massigli submitted a 48-hour ultimatum saying the British could either join the European Coal and Steel Community or not, which the British rejected. Even after Bevin rejected the French offer to join the Coal and Steel Community, Massigli continued to argue to Paris that the French should try to involve the British in the Coal and Steel Community as much as possible over the objections of Schuman.

Massigli urged that the Schuman plan be modified to tone down the supranational aspects of a "High Authority" that would control the coal and steel industries of France and West Germany, and to move away from the ultimate goal of creating a European federation, believing that these changes might compel the British Prime Minister Clement Attlee to change his mind about Britain participating in the plan. Massigli was so opposed to France participating in the Schumann Plan without Britain that he almost resigned in protest. Because the economy of West Germany was three times larger than that of France, he viewed France joining the proposed European Coal and Steel Community without Britain as a counterweight to be "suicidal", believing the community would be a German-dominated club that would effectively mark the end of France as a great power. Massigli was also opposed to the Schuman Plan because it came from outside of the Quai d'Orsay, writing that Monnet as l’inspirateur was not a diplomat who functioned only as a "technocrate" and an "autocrat" who was unable to understand France's national interests properly. In this way, Monnet and Massigli, both “gaullistes de guerre" turned on each other with the two men making it very clear in their memoirs that they did not agree on the Schuman Plan.

In the same way Massigli was strongly opposed to West German rearmament, an issue that was first raised in 1950 in response to the Korean War. In 1950, it was widely believed that the North Korean invasion of South Korea was a ploy by Stalin to draw away U.S. forces from Europe to Asia as the prelude for a Soviet invasion of Western Europe. Massigli's vision of a European defense depended on two strands, securing the "continental commitment" from Britain and keeping very strict controls on any military force that West Germany might possess. Massigli told Bevin that to avoid the impression in France that Britain was "still governed by the spirit of Dunkirk" that the British should station military forces on French soil and open regular staff talks. Massigli urged that Britain, France and the other western European states should increase their own defense spending in response to fears of a Soviet invasion, and argued that West German rearmament would be counterproductive as it would create a rival for raw materials that West Germany would have to import that would hinder rearmament in both Britain and France. Finally, Massigli warned that French public opinion would not like the idea of West German rearmament only five years after 1945, and if the Western powers allowed it, it was bound to cause a reaction that would only benefit the Soviets. He was initially reassured when Bevin told him that he too was opposed to West German rearmament. In September 1950, the United States announced it favored West German rearmament, and what Massigli saw as a personal betrayal, Bevin endorsed the concept. Massigli was especially opposed to the West German rearmament as the American proposal called for former Wehrmacht officers to lead the West German Army, and because he noted that there was always the possibility that the United States could return to isolationism while there was no undoing West German rearmament.

With both the United States and Great Britain in favor of West German rearmament, the French compromised by proposing in October 1950 the Pleven Plan of a European army with a European Minister of Defense and common budget. Through he disliked the idea of a "European Army", Massigli realized that at least under the Pleven Plan West Germany would not its own army. In a dispatch to Paris, he hoped that the European Army would not be "un organisme germano-franco-italien" and would involve contingents from Britain and Scandinavia as well. Massigli was especially worried when learned from the Quai d'Orsay's Political Director, Roland de Margerie, of the disorganisation within the French cabinet and of the lack of studies about the implications of the Pleven Plan. As Massigli noted that as Anglo-French relations continued to be troubled over disagreements over the Schuman and Pleven Plans, that Franco-American relations correspondingly improved with the United States government committing itself in 1951 to pay for all of the costs of French war in Indochina. Massigli in a dispatch to Paris expressed regret over "a tendency to give all our attention and care to Franco-American relations and to consider our friendship with Britain as a secondary matter." Despite all the problems in Anglo-French relations, Massigli felt that the United Kingdom rather than the United States was still the ideal alliance partner as he argued that the United States was so overwhelmingly powerful that Franco-American relations were bound to be unequal while relations with Britain were those of a power more or less equal to France."

"The British were less than supportive of the Pleven Plan as there was much opposition to it within the French National Assembly, and continued to favor letting the Federal Republic of Germany rearm instead." The return of the Conservatives to power following the October 1951 election did not change Anglo-French relations very much as Massigli noted that the views of Churchill and Eden (once again Prime Minister and Foreign Secretary, respectively) were not much different from Attlee and Bevin's. Massigli continued to pressure them to become involved in the planned European Defence Community (EDC), and Eden agreed to a declaration linking Britain to the EDC. Massigli suggested several changes to the EDC, such as turning it from being a proto-federation into a military alliance, and having an "enlarged Europe" instead of a "small Europe" dominated by West Germany. Massigli felt if the EDC treaty was tweaked so it did not involve any loss of sovereignty, more western European states, such as Britain, would then be willing to join, and the increase in numbers would more than offset the loss of a unified decision-making body. Schuman dismissed Massigli's advocacy of a "co-federal solution" as giving too much power to rearmed West Germany, and felt that some sort of "European" control over a German army was necessary to protect France.

Massigli noted that the British disliked the EDC project because of its "supranational" aspects with European states losing control of their armed forces, but he felt that agreements calling for "technical" co-operation might offer a way of involving the British in the "European army" project without officially joining. Massigli advised Eden to seriously consider his proposals and told Strang that the French people would not understand why France was being asked to sacrifice control of their armed forces for the sake of European unity while the British were not. After Eden turned down Massigli's proposals for "technical" co-operation, Massigli became increasingly hostile to the EDC project from 1953, fearing that it might surrender French control of their armed forces to West Germany. Massigli warned of the "nationalist currents" in West Germany and noted that as the West German Wirtschaftswunder ("economic miracle") continued that the Germans were becoming more and more self-confident, wealthy and powerful. In a visit to Paris, Massigli told President Vincent Auriol that he would resign in protest if the EDC treaty came into effect, saying it was foolish for France to continue defending the "folie totale" of a European Army.

In 1953, Massigli, by then the Dean of the Diplomatic Corps in London, reported to Paris that the new Queen, Elizabeth II, was "a gracious image of youth and hope". Massigli called the Queen's Coronation a "radiant memory" that would "remain with us a solace for past trials and as an inspiration in the tasks which lie ahead." "Finally, the Anglophile Massigli praised what he called "the British genius of linking the past, the present and the future in one great pattern of continuity".

As the French ambassador to the Court of St. James, Massigli played a major role behind the scenes in resolving the 1954 crisis in trans-Atlantic relations caused by the rejection by the French National Assembly of the European Defence Community (EDC) treaty. Massigli praised the appointment of Pierre Mendès France as foreign minister in July 1954, calling him a man of "conviction and patriotism". As an ambassador to the court of St. James, Massigli held considerable prestige within the Quai d’Orsay, and was quite open in his criticism of Monnet, writing in a letter to Mendès France: "Since Jean Monnet has become a supranational personality, he is incapable of interpreting French government thinking." Likewise, Massigli was opposed the concept of the EDC, and threatened to resign if the National Assembly voted for the Pleven plan. Massigli supported the amendments to the EDC treaty proposed by Mendès France that would have weakened the ability of West Germany to rearm and the supranational aspects of the Pleven Plan. In a letter to Mendès France, Massigli wrote that if the EDC treaty was rejected by the National Assembly, Churchill favored West German rearmament and letting West Germany join NATO with some restrictions, or a "NATO with strings" as Massigli phrased it. On 19–22 August 1954, a conference was called in Brussels to discuss the changes to the EDC treaty that the French were advocating, which were rejected by the Americans and West Germans. Afterwards, Massigli went with Mendès France to Chartwell to meet Churchill and Eden to discuss the crisis. During the Chartwell meeting, Massigli made clear his opposition to supranational defense plans and that he favored having Britain becoming more involved in the defense of western Europe as the price of French acceptance of West German rearmament. On 30 August 1954, the National Assembly rejected the EDC treaty.

To replace the Pleven plan, the British government opened a conference in London on 28 September 1954. to discuss West German rearmament. Eden, once again Foreign Secretary for the third time since 1935, promised the French that Britain would always maintain at least four divisions in the British Army of the Rhine as long as there was a Soviet threat in exchange for French acceptance of West German rearmament. Eden's promise of a strengthened British Army of the Rhine was just as much aimed implicitly against a revived German militarism as it was aimed explicitly against Soviet Union. Massigli, attending the conference wept tears of joy at Eden's speech, saying that the France "had been waiting fifty years for such an announcement!" (a reference to the Entente cordiale of 1904). The historian Rogelia Pastor-Castro wrote that the resolution of the West German rearmament question was a "personal success" for Massigli as the crisis was ended along the lines that he had suggested at the Chartwell summit. In 1955–1956, Massigli served as the Secretary-General of the Quai d'Orsay. When Massigli left London in January 1955 to take up his position as Secretary-General, in a mark of the high esteem which he was held by the British, he attended a private fare-well luncheon at Buckingham Palace hosted by Queen Elizabeth II, a rare honor for any departing ambassador in London.

== Later life ==
In 1956, Massigli retired. His memoirs, Une comédie des erreurs recounting his ten years in London, were published in 1978, during which he recounted what he saw as the great missed opportunity for an Anglo-French partnership after the war. Massigli still remained optimistic about the possibility of an Anglo-French partnership, ending Une comédie des erreurs with a quote from Shakespeare: "And now let's go hand in hand, not one before another". He died in Paris on 3 February 1988, at the age of 99.

== Honours ==
Massigli was appointed Grand Cross of the Legion of Honour in 1954. He was appointed an honorary Knight Commander of the Order of the British Empire in 1938, honorary Knight Grand Cross of the Royal Victorian Order in 1950, and honorary Member of the Order of the Companions of Honour in 1954.

== Works ==
- "New Conceptions of French Policy in Tropical Africa" pp. 403–415 from International Affairs, Volume 33, No. 4, October 1957.
- La Turquie devant la guerre. Mission à Ankara 1939–1940, Paris: Plon, 1964.
- Une comédie des erreurs. 1943–1956 : souvenirs et réflexions sur une étape de la construction européenne, Paris: Plon, 1978.

== Marriage ==
Massigli married Odette Isabelle Boissier in Paris on 21 December 1932.

== Sources ==
- Adamthwaite, Anthony (1977). France and the Coming of the Second World War 1936–1939. London: Frank Cass. ISBN 978-0-7146-3035-9.
- Bell, Philip (2014). France and Britain, 1940-1994: The Long Separation. London: Routledge. ISBN 978-1317888413.
- Large, David Clay (1996). Germans to the Front: West German Rearmament in the Adenauer Era. Chapel Hill: University of North Carolina Press. ISBN 978-0807845394.
- Duroselle, Jean Baptiste (2004). France and the Nazi Threat: The Collapse of French Diplomacy, 1932–1939. New York: Enigma Books. ISBN 978-1-929631-15-5.
- Fenby, Jonathan (2011). The General: Charles de Gaulle and the France He Saved. New York: Simon & Schuster. ISBN 978-1847394101.
- El-Solh, Raghid (2004). Lebanon and Arabism: National Identity and State Formation. London: I. B. Tauris. ISBN 9781860640513.
- Kersaudy, François (1981). Churchill and de Gaulle. New York: Atheneum. ISBN 978-0-689-11265-2.
- Loth, Wilfried (1988). "General Introduction". In Walter Lipgens; Wilfried Loth (eds.). Documents on the History of European Integration: The Struggle for European Union by Political Parties and Pressure Groups in Western European Count. Berlin: Walter de Gruyter. pp. 1–16. ISBN 9783110114294.
- Osborn, Patrick (2000). Operation Pike: Britain Versus the Soviet Union, 1939-1941. Santa Barbara: Greenwood Publishing Group. ISBN 0313313687.
- Pastor-Castro, Rogelia (July 2006). "The Quai d'Orsay and the European Defence Community Crisis of 1954". History. 91 (303): 386–400. doi:10.1080/09592296.2013.848654. S2CID 153449470.
- Pastor-Castro, Rogelia (2013). "René Massigli's Mission to London, 1944–1954". Diplomacy and Statecraft. 24 (4): 539–558. doi:10.1080/09592296.2013.848654. S2CID 153449470.
- Purcell, H. D. (1965). "Review of La Turquie devant la Guerre: Mission à Ankara 1939–1940". International Affairs. 41 (1): 152–153. doi:10.2307/2612003. JSTOR 2612003.
- Schuker, Stephen (1997). "France and the Remilitarization of the Rhineland, 1936". In Patrick Finney (ed.). The Origins of the Second World War: a Reader. London: Arnold Press. pp. 206–221. ISBN 9780340676400.
- Shipway, Martin (2002). The Road To War: France and Vietnam 1944–1947. Oxford: Berghahn Books. ISBN 978-1-57181-149-3.
- Thomas, Martin (1999). "France and the Czechoslovak Crisis". In Erik Goldstein; Igor Lukes (eds.). The Munich Crisis, 1938: Prelude to World War II. London: Frank Cass. pp. 122–159. ISBN 0-7146-8056-7.
- Thomas, Martin (2001). "Free France, the British Government and the Future of French Indochina 1940–45". In Paul H. Kratoska (ed.). Independence through Revolutionary War. South East Asia: Colonial History. Vol. 6. London: Routledge. pp. 223–251. ISBN 978-0-415-24785-6.
- Trachtenberg, Marc (1979). "Reparation at the Paris Peace Conference" (PDF). The Journal of Modern History. 51 (1): 24–55. doi:10.1086/241847. JSTOR 1877873. S2CID 145777701. Archived from the original (PDF) on 7 June 2021.
- Ulrich, Raphäelle (1998). "René Massigli and Germany, 1919–1938". In Robert Boyce (ed.). French Foreign and Defence Policy, 1918–1940: The Decline and Fall of a Great Power. London: Routledge. pp. 132–148. ISBN 978-0-415-15039-2.
- Vaïsse, Maurice (1983). "Against Appeasement: French Advocates of Firmness, 1933–38". In Wolfgang Mommsen; Lothar Kettenacker (eds.). The Fascist Challenge and the Policy of Appeasement. London: George Allen & Unwin. pp. 227–235. ISBN 978-0-04-940068-9.
- Watt, D. C. (1989). How War Came: the Immediate Origins of the Second World War, 1938–1939. New York: Pantheon Books. ISBN 978-0-394-57916-0.
- Wandycz, Piotr (1988). The Twilight of French Eastern Alliances, 1926-1936: French-Czechoslovak-Polish Relations from Locarno to the Remilitarization of the Rhineland. Princeton: Princeton University Press. ISBN 1400859816.
