= Jérôme Seydoux =

French businessman (born 1934)

- Born: Jérôme Seydoux Fornier de Clausonne; 21 September 1934 (age 92); Paris, France
- Occupations: Businessman; film producer
- Years active: 1962–present
- Spouse: Sophie Desserteaux (m. 1988)
- Family: Seydoux

Jérôme Seydoux Fornier de Clausonne (born 21 September 1934 in Paris) is a French businessman and film producer.

== Early life ==
Jérôme Seydoux was born on 21 September 1934 in Paris's 16th arrondissement. He is the son of René Seydoux Fornier de Clausonne and Geneviève Schlumberger, the brother of Véronique, Nicolas, and Michel Seydoux, the father of Henri Seydoux, the stepfather of Farida Khelfa, and the grandfather of Camille Seydoux and Léa Seydoux. He studied at the Ecole nationale supérieure d'électronique, d'électrotechnique et d'hydraulique de Toulouse.

== Career ==
Seydoux began his career in 1962 as a financial analyst at Istel, Lepercq & Co. in New York. In 1975, he was elected president of Schlumberger, but was quickly driven out of the company following a power struggle. In 1986, he chaired the board of directors of La Cinq with Silvio Berlusconi.

In 1990, Seydoux's Chargeurs conglomerate purchased the Pathé film company from Giancarlo Parretti for 1.1 billion francs. He served as the company's président-directeur général (PDG) until 2000. In 1993, he became a shareholder of the newspaper Libération. In February 1999, he acquired a stake in the football club Olympique Lyonnais. The Fondation Jérôme Seydoux-Pathé, which he founded and was recognized as a non-profit organization in 2006, serves to preserve, restore, and enhance Pathé's historical heritage, which includes more than 10,000 films.

Faced with the COVID-19 crisis and its consequences on cinema, which caused movie theater attendance to plummet, Jérôme Seydoux, alongside Pathé's teams, decided to embark on major French productions reminiscent of the 1950s and 1960s, particularly "large historical frescoes" that are rarely produced by modern Hollywood. The early results of this new strategy notably include The Three Musketeers (2023), The Count of Monte Cristo (2024), 13 Days 13 Nights (2025), and in 2026, De Gaulle. Commercially, the strategy initiated by Jérôme Seydoux is working overall, despite the mixed box-office performance of 13 Days 13 Nights. Furthermore, Jérôme Seydoux has always admired General de Gaulle, which motivated his decision to produce De Gaulle (2026) with a substantial budget.

Following these successes, several French cinema groups are following the strategy of epic historical frescoes and major literary adaptations initiated by Pathé and Jérôme Seydoux, notably StudioCanal with Les Misérables and SND Films with Dracula : a love tale (shot in english) in partnership with EuropaCorp, and Fantômas: The New World in 2027.

== Personal life ==
Seydoux was first married to Hélène Zumbiehl, with whom he had four children, Carlotta, Henri (Léa's father), Alexis and Ludovic, before divorcing. In 1988, he married Sophie Desserteaux. In 1989, Zumbiehl committed suicide by setting fire to her car and locking herself in it. After her death, their children distanced themselves from Jérôme. In 1991, he had his last son, Jules, with Desserteaux. He also adopted Pénélope, Thomas, and Raphaëlla, the children Sophie had with her former husband Christophe Riboud, who died in a car accident in 1987.

== Wealth ==
Seydoux's fortune in 2025 was estimated at 1.5 billion euros, placing him 89th among the richest French people.

== Filmography ==
Year	Title	Credits	Director	Notes
2008	Asterix at the Olympic Games		Frédéric Forestier and Thomas Langmann	
2011	The Well-Digger's Daughter		Daniel Auteuil	
2011	My Worst Nightmare		Anne Fontaine	
2012	LOL	Executive producer	Lisa Azuelos	
2012	Bowling		Marie-Castille Mention-Schaar	
2012	Zaytoun	Executive producer	Eran Riklis	
2013	The Great Beauty	Co-producer	Paolo Sorrentino	Academy Award for Best Foreign Language Film
2013	Fanny		Daniel Auteuil	
2013	Marius		Daniel Auteuil	
2013	The French Minister	Executive producer	Bertrand Tavernier	
2014	Two Men in Town		Rachid Bouchareb	
2015	Masaan	Co-producer	Neeraj Ghaywan	
2015	Youth	Co-producer	Paolo Sorrentino	
2015	The Wait	Co-producer	Piero Messina	
2016	Raid dingue		Dany Boon	
2017	In the Fade	Co-producer	Fatih Akin	
2018	Loro	Co-producer	Paolo Sorrentino	
2019	The Wolf's Call		Antonin Baudry	
2019	The Golden Glove	Co-producer	Fatih Akin	
2021	CODA		Sian Heder	Academy Award for Best Picture
2021	Eiffel		Martin Bourboulon	
2021	Benedetta		Paul Verhoeven	
2022	Notre-Dame on Fire		Jean-Jacques Annaud	
2023	Asterix & Obelix: The Middle Kingdom		Guillaume Canet	
2023	Life for Real		Dany Boon	
2023	La Graine		Eloïse Lang	
2026	De Gaulle		Antonin Baudry	

Acting

Year	Title	Role	Director	Notes
1997	Didier	Man in the airport next to Claude Berri	Alain Chabat	
2010	Nothing to Declare	Restaurant customer	Dany Boon	
2012	Happiness Never Comes Alone	Professor Deloèle	James Huth	

== Awards and nominations ==
Award	Year	Category	Film	Result	Ref.
César Awards	2008	Best Film (shared with Julian Schnabel)	The Diving Bell and the Butterfly	Nominated	
César Awards	2013	Best Film (shared with Dimitri Rassam, Matthieu Delaporte and Alexandre de La Patellière)	What's in a Name?	Nominated	
César Awards	2020	Best First Film (shared with Antonin Baudry and Alain Attal)	The Wolf's Call	Nominated	
César Awards	2025	Best Film (shared with Alexandre de La Patellière, Matthieu Delaporte and Dimitri Rassam)	The Count of Monte Cristo	Nominated	

== Honours ==
- 2009: Officer of the Legion of Honour
