= Thierry Peugeot =

French heir and business executive (born 1957)

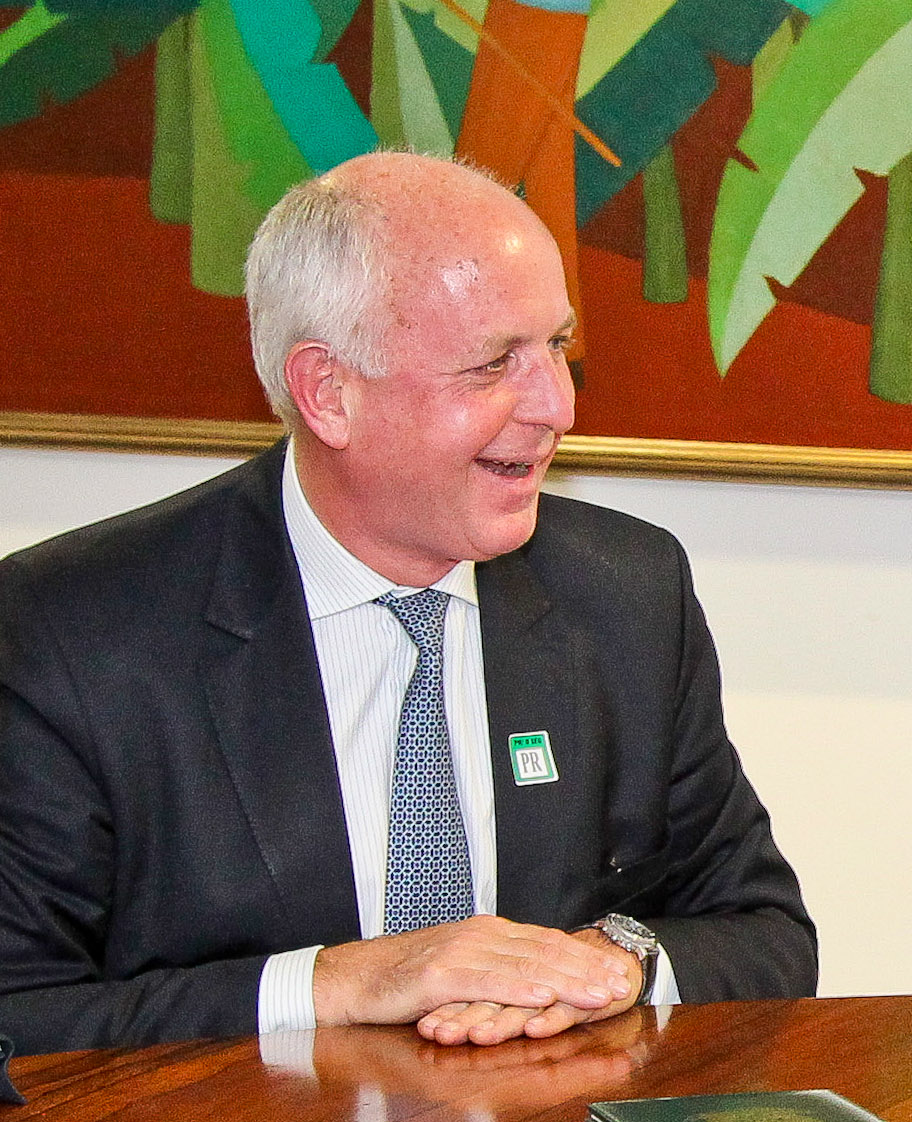
- Peugeot in 2011
- Born: Thierry François Rodolphe Peugeot; 19 August 1957 (age 69); Paris, France
- Education: Lycée Janson-de-Sailly
- Alma mater: ESSEC Business School; INSEAD
- Occupation: Business executive
- Children: 4
- Parent: Pierre Peugeot
- Relatives: Marie-Hélène Roncoroni (sister)

Thierry François Rodolphe Peugeot (French: [tjeʁi pœʒo]; born 1957) is a French heir and business executive.

== Early life ==
Thierry Peugeot was born in 1957. His father, Pierre Peugeot, served as the Chairman of Peugeot. He has a sister, Marie-Hélène Roncoroni. He graduated from the ESSEC Business School.

== Career ==
He has served on the Board of Directors of Société Foncière Financières et de Participations, the family investment company, since 1991. He has served as a Director of Faurecia since 2003 and Air Liquide since 2005.

He served the Chairman of the Supervisory Board of PSA Peugeot Citroën from 2002 to 2014. He stepped down after he disagreed with the other major shareholders, the French state and the Chinese company Dongfeng Motor, about the need to share the same strategic future as Dongfeng Motor.

He serves as one of five honorary presidents of the Association Nationale des Sociétés par Actions.
