= Haute société protestante =

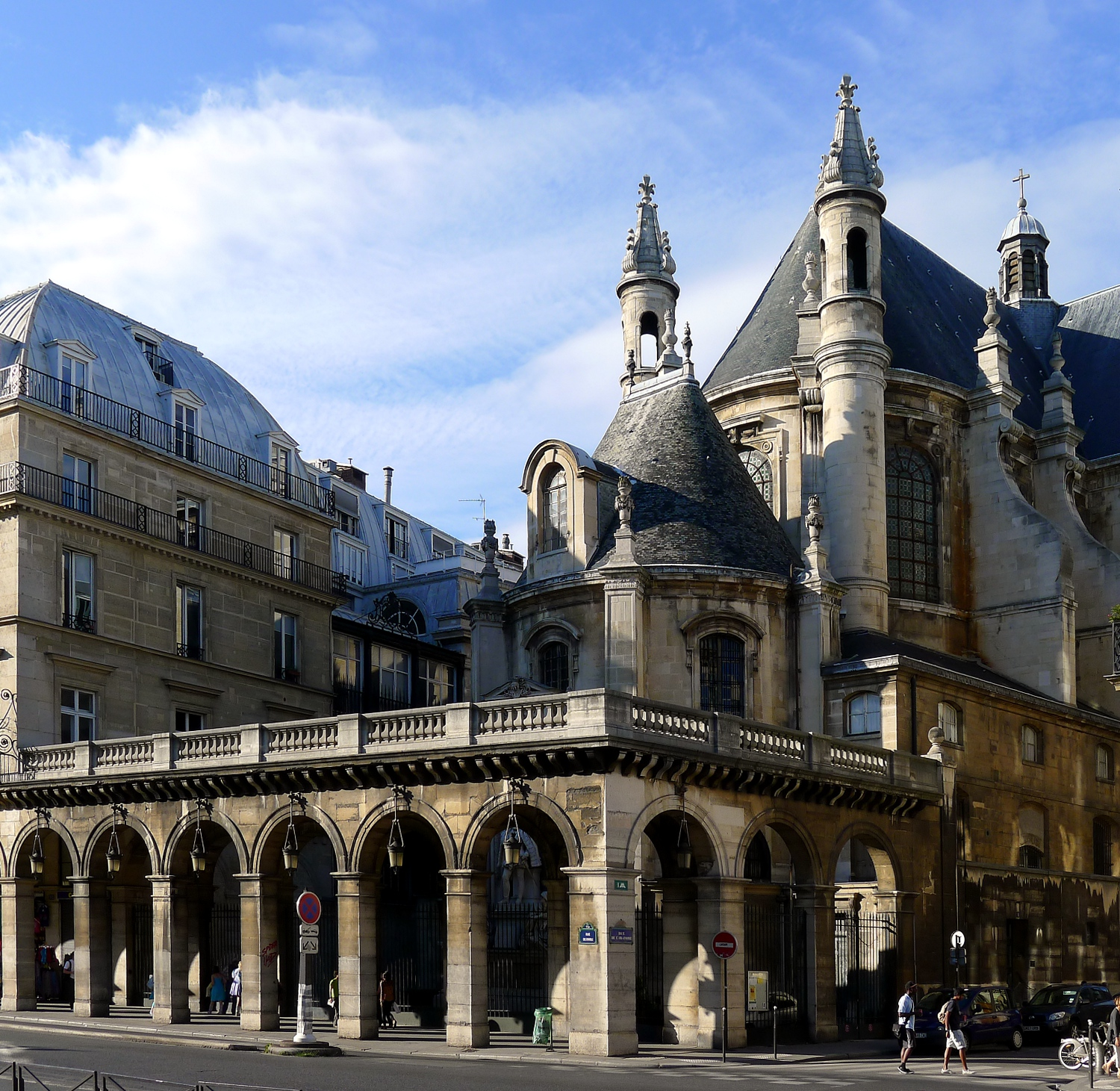
Ornate French neo-Gothic architecture of a Protestant church on Rivoli Street in Paris.

Haute société protestante (Protestant high society), abbreviated HSP, is a French term, coined in the 19th century, which designates a group of wealthy Protestant families, to whom are attributed mutual solidarity and partly hidden power within an elite and a predominantly Catholic French society. The expression therefore applies essentially to members of families of the large Protestant bourgeoisie made up of large industrialists, bankers, merchants and shipowners whose fortunes and networks of influence date back to the 19th century.

The families frequently cited in this context include the André, Bethmann, Courvoisier, Davillier, Delessert, Dietrich, Dollfus, Frerejean, Guerlain, Hermès, Hottinguer, Japy, Kaltenbach, Koechlin, Mallet, Marchegay, Mieg, Mirabaud, Monod, Nègre, Odier, Peugeot, Poupart de Neuflize, Raoul-Duval, Renouard de Bussière, Riboud, Sabatier, Say, Schlumberger, Seydoux, Vernes. Manipulated by some anti-Protestant polemicists, the concept of HSP is nonetheless recognized and used in sociology.

According to the historian and genealogist Éric Bungener: “around the regents of the Bank of France under the Empire, the myth of an HSP, “Protestant high society”, was constructed, made up of a very small number of families, very rich, and who married each other”.

== Sociological evolution ==
=== In Paris ===
A good indicator of the composition of the Protestant elite of the early 19th century, the analysis of the origins and professions of the consistory of the Reformed Church of Paris indicates, in addition to the fact that its members are half of foreign origin, that both the main professions there are those of banker and merchant. In addition, certain Protestants had important political careers in the 19th century, well characterized by the ministers Guizot and Waddington. It was within this fortunate society that a number of followers of the Reveil were recruited, particularly those who attended the Chapelle de la rue Taibout, and who financed a number of Protestant works of a social or religious nature.

It is important to clarify, at this stage, that the HSP only represents a minority of Parisian Protestants. There exists, among the Reformed as among the Lutherans, on the one hand, a small and middle bourgeoisie and, on the other hand, a working and peasant people, both in Paris intra muros and in the suburbs.

In 1903, the Parisian HSP retained a very particular socio-professional structure including, in descending order, professors, doctors, pastors and bankers. Its importance diminished after the First World War, and its discretion made it little visible. However, in 1935, the list of the "two hundred most influential Protestant families" indicated that the banking and business management professions, mainly Parisian, continued to dominate the ranking of activities. We also note that the involvement of these families in the leadership of Protestant churches remains strong. Around 1950, Protestant high society represented around 1,500 adults, concentrated in Paris in the parishes of Passy, Étoile and Pentemont, with family branches in Switzerland and in Anglo-Saxon countries.

Today, the concentration of businesses has caused the disappearance of many of the family businesses that made the social fabric of the Parisian HSP unique. Its social structure is now perfectly similar to that of the French upper bourgeoisie in general: business leaders, engineers, lawyers, doctors, senior executives, senior civil servants and academics. The secularization of society also removes part of its relevance from the notion of HSP, which today appears much more diluted than at the end of the 19th century, despite the counts of personalities from the economic world of Protestant origin produced at the occasion by certain authors.

=== In provincial towns ===
Certain large French cities, notably those located in traditional Protestant areas, also had their Protestant upper bourgeoisie: this is the case, for example, of Strasbourg, Mulhouse, Bordeaux, Lyon, Montpellier or Nîmes. The evolution of these social groups is of the same nature as that of the Parisian HSP. For example, in Lyon, the HSP represented at the beginning of the 21st century at most around thirty families and it practically ceased to exist at the end of the sixties, "when the ostracism towards Protestants from the Catholic bourgeoisie of Lyon ceased".

== Use of the expression in anti-Protestant polemics ==
At the end of the 19th century, the royalist and anti-Semitic journalist Ernest Renauld denounced “the Huguenot oligarchy”, referring to certain high positions in the public service occupied by Protestants. For Renauld, there is an over-representation of Protestantism in certain places in society. He further maintains that if “a Protestant leaves; another comes in his place", hence his denunciation of a "Protestant peril", which is the title of his work published in 1899. The term "high Protestant society" is taken up by polemicists, because it evokes conspiratorial innuendoes, analogous to the “Two Hundred Families” or the “Judeo-Masonic conspiracy”. It is no longer used much in the 20th century, the primary anti-Protestantism à la Barrès having almost disappeared, despite the publication of a few pamphlets that were still quite acidic.

== See also ==
- Protestantism in France
