= Une enfance française =

2024 book by Farida Khelfa

- Author: Farida Khelfa
- Language: French
- Genre: Memoir
- Publisher: Albin Michel
- Publication date: January 17, 2024
- ISBN: 2226490329

Une enfance française is a 2024 memoir by French-Algerian model, actress, and filmmaker Farida Khelda. Published by Albin Michel, the book marks Khelfa's literary debut and provides an account of her traumatic youth in the Minguettes as the child of Algerian immigrants.

The memoir was written over the course of a year following the death of Khelfa's mother in August 2022. Khelfa described the writing process as a compulsive one where "words tumbled out" as she returned to work after the funeral.

== Translations and adaptations ==
The book is currently only available in French, though an English translation is reportedly in the works. Khelfa has stated that she is developing the book into a feature film.
