= Marie-Hélène Peugeot-Roncoroni =

French heiress and businesswoman

- Born: Marie-Hélène Jeanne Therese Peugeot c. 1961 (age 64–65)
- Education: Sciences Po
- Occupation: Business executive
- Spouse: Mr Roncoroni
- Children: 4
- Parent: Pierre Peugeot
- Relatives: Thierry Peugeot (brother)

Marie-Hélène Jeanne Therese Peugeot-Roncoroni (born c. 1961) is a French heiress and businesswoman.

== Early life ==
Marie-Hélène Peugeot was born circa 1961. Her father, Pierre Peugeot, was the Chairman of Peugeot. She has three siblings, including Thierry Peugeot.

She graduated from Sciences Po.

== Career ==
Peugeot-Roncoroni started her career in an accounting firm.

She later joined her family business, Peugeot, where she worked in "corporate finance, industrial relations and human resources". She is on the Supervisory Board of PSA Peugeot Citroën from 1999 to 2014. She has been its Vice Chairman since 2014. She also is on the Board of Directors of Société Foncière Financières et de Participations, the family investment company. Additionally, she is the Chief Operating Officer and Director of Etablissements Peugeot Frères, a Peugeot investment firm. She also is on the Board of Directors of Simante SL.

She wason the Board of Directors of ONET S.A, a waste management and pest repellant company headquartered in Marseille. She also was on the Boards of the Assurances Mutuelles de France, the French insurance company for civil servants, and ESSO, the French subsidiary of ExxonMobil.

== Philanthropy ==
She is on the board of trustees of the Institut Diderot, a French think tank.

== Personal life ==
She is married to Mr Roncoroni. She has four children.
