= Farida Khelfa =

French model

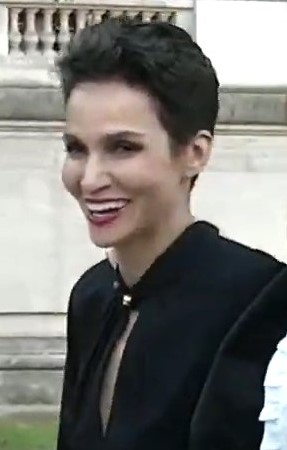
- Khelfa in 2019
- Born: 23 May 1960 (age 66); Lyon, France
- Occupations: actress, documentary filmmaker, author, model
- Spouse: Henri Seydoux (m. 2012)
- Children: Ismaël Seydoux; Omer Seydoux
- Relatives: Camille Seydoux (stepdaughter); Léa Seydoux (stepdaughter)

Farida Khelfa (born 23 May 1960) is a French-Algerian actress, documentary filmmaker, author, and model. A prominent figure in Parisian culture since the 1980s, she is recognized as one of the first models of North African descent to achieve international success. She served as a long-term muse to designers Jean Paul Gaultier and Azzedine Alaïa and was the brand ambassador for Sciaparelli from 2012 to 2017.

== Early life ==
Khelfa, one of nine children, was born in Lyon, France in the working-class suburb of Vénissieux to strict Algerian immigrant parents. Her childhood was marked by severe trauma, including child abuse and incest. Because of this, she ran away from her family at the age of 16, joining two of her sisters in Paris after a night of hitchhiking. It was there that she befriended a young Christian Louboutin, who gave her a place to stay. Khelfa decided to become a model "without [too much] ambition except being free."

When Khelfa first arrived in Paris, she "wandered everywhere" before discovering the nightclubs Le Palace and Les Bain Douches, becoming a doorman. She spent the next few years heavily involved in nightclub culture, where she would meet major figures of the fashion world.

== Career ==
While dancing at Le Palace in 1979, Khelfa was discovered by designer Jean Paul Gaultier. Gaultier would cast her in his 1980 fashion show, launching her modeling career. In the following years, she would become the muse to many important figures in the fashion world, including Jean-Paul Goude, Azzedine Alaïa, and Thierry Mugler.

Khelfa began acting in the 1980s, appearing in films such as La nuit porte-jarretelles (1985) and Lady Cops (1987). In the 2010s, she transitioned to documentary filmmaking.

In 2013 Khelfa was appointed as the brand ambassador for Schiaparelli. Khelfa stepped down as brand ambassador in 2017, stating that she needed time to focus on her own projects, particularly filmmaking. Despite this, Khelfa has continued to work with the brand, notably appearing on the Schiaparelli spring/summer 2020 Haute Couture runway in 2019. Most recently (as of April 2026), she worked with them in December 2024 on a photoshoot for 7 Hollywood Magazine.

In 2024, Khelfa wrote her first book, a memoir titled Une enfance française.

== Personal life ==
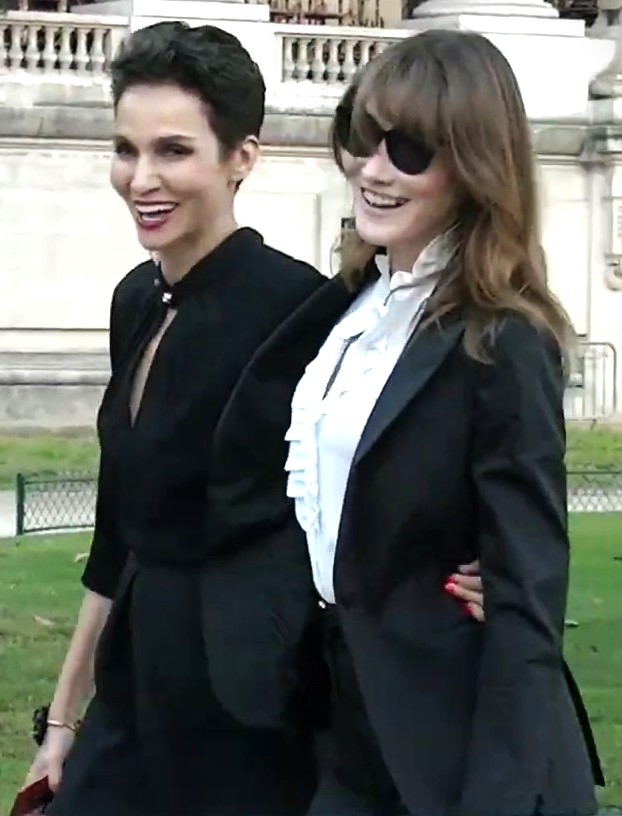
Khelfa and Carla Bruni Sarkozy in 2019

In 1982, Khelfa became romantically involved with 44-year-old photographer Jean-Paul Goude. She cites Goude as the one to introduce her to "so many things, like the Bauhaus, Stravinsky, the Russian ballets."

Khelfa married businessman and CEO Henri Seydoux in 2012. The couple has been together since 1989 and already had two sons together at the time of their marriage. Khelfa became the step-mother of stylist Camille Seydoux and actress Léa Seydoux, Seydoux's children from his first marriage to actress Valérie Schlumberger.

Khelfa's mother died in August 2022. Her mother's funeral inspired her to write her autobiography.

Khelfa is a friend of model Carla Bruni and was a witness at her 2008 wedding to French president Nicolas Sarkozy.

== Filmography ==
=== Acting credits ===
Film
Year	Title	Role	Notes	Reference(s)
1980	Mator (short film)		dir. Dante Desarthe	
1985	La Nuit porte-jarretelles		dir. Virginie Thévenet	
1985	Mode in France (TV movie)	Self (as Farida)		
1987	Jeux d'artifices	Farida	dir. Virginie Thévenetévenet	
1987	Lady Cops	Yasmine	dir. Josiane Balasko	
1990	Pacific Palisades	Julie	dir. Bernard Schmitt	
1990	1001 Nights	The Queen	dir. Philippe de Broca	
1991	Ennui mortel (short film)		dir. Philippe Bérenger	
1995	La malaimée	Solange	dir. Jean-Paul Scarpitta	
2006	Gradiva	Elvira	dir. Alain Robbe-Grillet	
2007	The Diving Bell and the Butterfly	Self	dir. Julian Schnabel	
2008	Carla Bruni en toute liberté (TV special)	Self		
2008	Paris	Farida	dir. Cédric Klapisch	
2008	Française	The mother	dir. Souad El-Bouhati	
2009	Bluebeard	Mére supérieure	dir. Catherine Breillat	
2009	La Traversée du désir	Self	dir. Arielle Dombasle	
2009	Neuilly sa mère!	Nadia	dir. Gabriel Julien-Laferriére	
2012	Bankable (TV movie)	Eléonore		
2013	Opium	Yvette	dir. Arielle Dombasle	
2015	Elsa Schiaparelli: Mode ist Kunst (TV movie)	Self	dir. Sabine Carbon	
2016	Franca: Chaos and Creation	Self	dir. Francesco Carrozzini	
2018	Neuilly sa mère, sa mère!	Nadia	dir. Gabriel Julien-Laferriére	
2018	Les Michetonneuses (TV movie)	Anna	dir. Olivier Doran	
2018	Jean Paul Gaultier: Freak and Chic (TV movie)	Self		
2018	Jean Paul Gaultier fait son show (TV special)	Self		
2022	Azzedine Alaïa: Un couturier français (TV movie)	Self	dir. Olivier Nicklaus	
Television
Year	Title	Role	Notes	Reference(s)
1999	La case de l'oncle Doc	Self	Episode: "Farida, Rachid, Zinedine et les autres"	
	X Femmes	Blondie's friend	Episode: "Le bijou indiscret"	
2009	Élection de Miss France (TV miniseries)	Self	Episode: "Miss France 2010"	
2011	La boîte à questions	Self	Episode: "19 January 2011"	
2011	On n'est pas couché	Self	Episode: "Episode #5.22"	
2008-2011	Vivement dimanche	Self	3 episodes	
2009-2012	Aïcha	Malika	4 episodes	
2008-2013	Le Grand Journal (Canal+)	Self	3 episodes	
2016	Thé ou café	Self	Episode: "13 November 2016"	
2017	Fashion Insiders	Self		
2021	La nuit du ramadan	Self	Episode: "La nuit du Ramadan, les 30 ans"	
2024	Clique	Self	Episode: "30 January 2024"	
Music Videos
Year	Title	Role	Notes	Reference(s)
2026	SS26	Charli XCX		

=== Directing credits ===
Television
Year	Title	Notes	Reference(s)
2011	Empreintes (anthology series)	Episode: "Jean Paul Gaultier ou les codes bouleversés"	
2012	Campagne intime (TV documentary)		
2014	Louboutin (TV documentary)		
2021	De l'autre côté du voile (TV documentary)		

== Bibliography ==
Year	Title	Publisher	ISBN
2024	Une enfance française	Albin Michel	978-2-226-49032-2
