= Pierre Peugeot =

French businessperson (1932–2002)

- Born: 11 June 1932; Paris, France
- Died: 1 December 2002 (aged 70); Paris, France
- Education: École Polytechnique
- Occupation: Business executive
- Children: Thierry Peugeot; Pascaline de Dreuzy; Marie-Hélène Roncoroni; Xavier Peugeot

Pierre Robert Rodolphe Peugeot (French: [pjɛʁ pøʒo]; 1932–2002) was a French heir and business executive.

== Early life ==
Pierre Peugeot was born in 1932.

== Career ==
He served on the Board of Directors of Peugeot from 1978 to 1992. He then served as the Chairman of its Supervisory Board from 1992 to 2002.

== Death ==
He died in 2002 in Paris. He was seventy years old. Upon his death, Prime Minister Jean-Pierre Raffarin released a statement to honor, "the memory of a prominent industrialist who played a determining part in turning a French family business into a global corporation, while being promoting the national interests and paving the way for the technological development of our country. His industrial daring and humanism set an example for us all."
