= Camille Seydoux =

French fashion stylist (born 1982)

- Born: Camille Seydoux-Fornier de Clausonne; 23 March 1982 (age 43); Paris, France
- Occupation: Fashion stylist
- Children: 3
- Family: Seydoux

Camille Seydoux-Fornier de Clausonne (born 23 March 1982) is a French stylist. Her clients include Adèle Exarchopoulos, Bérénice Bejo, and Valeria Bruni-Tedeschi.

== Early life ==
Seydoux is the elder of two sisters born to businessman Henri Seydoux and philanthropist Valérie Schlumberger. She has six siblings including three older maternal half-siblings, younger sister actress Léa Seydoux, and two younger half-brothers from her father's second marriage to model Farida Khelfa.

Seydoux was born into two wealthy and prominent French families. On her paternal side (the Seydoux family) she is the granddaughter of Pathé owner Jérôme Seydoux. On both her paternal and maternal sides she is related to the Schlumberger brothers.

Seydoux was raised as a Protestant.

== Career ==
Seydoux began her career in advertising and arts before informally styling her sister Léa Seydoux in 2011. In 2012 she styled her sister for the premiere of Farewell, My Queen at the 62nd Berlin International Film Festival and began to receive requests to officially work as a stylist. In 2015 she was involved with custom creating looks by Prada and Miu Miu for Léa to wear on the red carpet.

In 2016 Seydoux collaborated with Roger Vivier to create a denim capsule collection inspired by actress Jane Birkin.

== Personal life ==
Seydoux lives in The Marais, Paris. She has three children.
