= Michel Seydoux =

French businessman and film producer (born 1947)

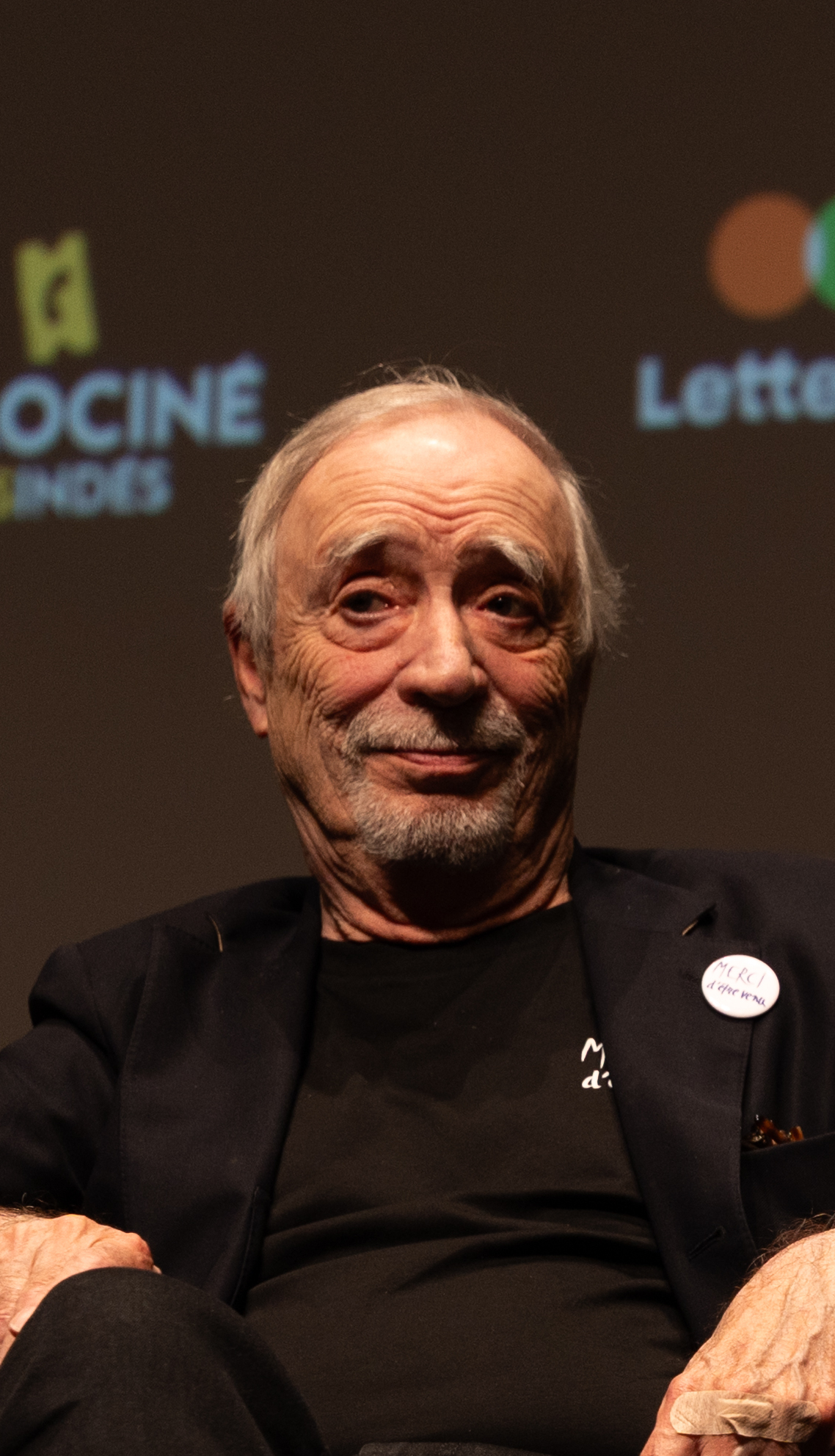
- Seydoux in 2026
- Born: 11 September 1947 (age 79); Paris, France
- Occupation: Film producer
- Years active: 1973–present
- Family: Seydoux

Michel Seydoux (French: [sɛdu]; born 11 September 1947) is a French businessman and film producer. He is also the former president and chairman of French professional football club Lille OSC.

In 1974–1976, Seydoux worked with director Alejandro Jodorowsky on a film adaptation of Frank Herbert's Dune. The movie was never made due to lack of financing; the story of the project is told in Jodorowsky's Dune, which prominently features Seydoux.

In 1997 he was a member of the jury at the 20th Moscow International Film Festival.

== Family ==
Seydoux is the grandson of scientist Marcel Schlumberger and has two brothers; Jérôme and Nicolas. Jérôme is a shareholder on football club Olympique Lyonnais. Seydoux is the grand-uncle of actress Léa Seydoux, who starred as Lady Margot Fenring in Dune: Part Two (2024).

== Selected filmography ==
- Lily, aime-moi (1975)
- F comme Fairbanks (1976)
- Shadow of the Castles (1977)
- Don Giovanni (1979)
- Cyrano de Bergerac (1990)
- Close to Eden (1991)
- Smoking/No Smoking (1993)
- Burnt by the Sun (1994)
- The Barber of Siberia (1998)
- Leaving (2009)
- Pater (2011)
- The Dance of Reality (2013)
- The Sense of Wonder (2015)
- Living and Knowing You're Alive (2019)
- Heart of Oak (2022; also co-director)
