= François Seydoux de Clausonne =

French diplomat

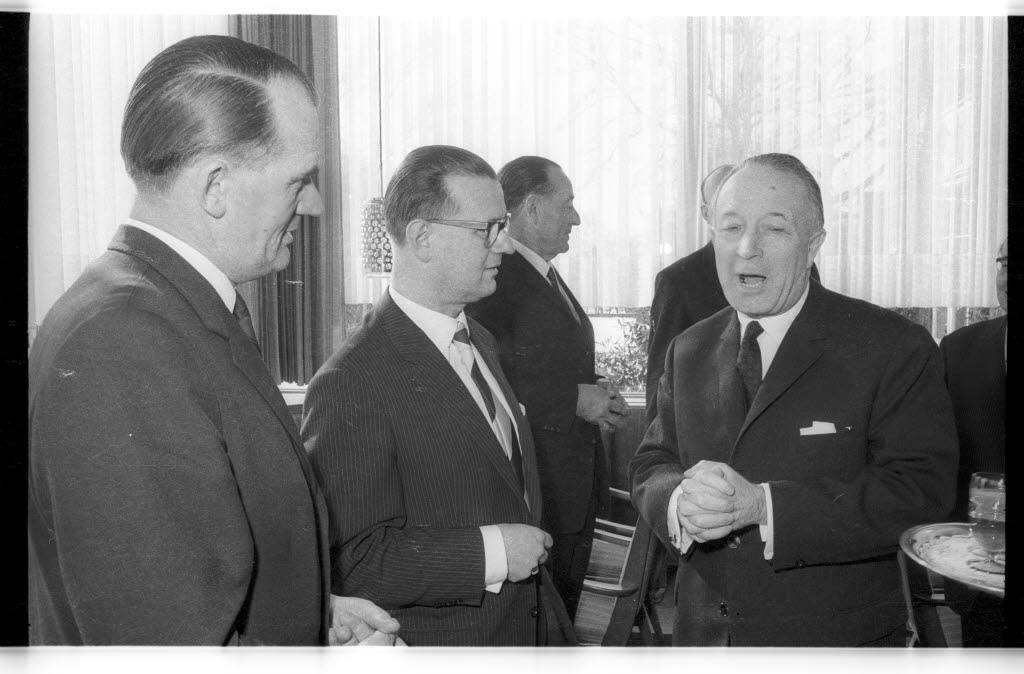
A picture of French. Ambassador Francois Seydoux de Claudine at a Reception in the Hotel Conti-Hansa castle garden 7.(In the picture from left to right:Prosecutor Heyck, Interior Minister Hartwig Schlegelberger and French Ambassador Francois Seydoux de Clausonne)

François Seydoux Fornier de Clausonne (15 February 1905 in Berlin – 30 August 1981) was a French diplomat.

Seydoux de Clausonne was born the son of a French diplomat. After studying philosophy and law in Paris in 1928, he joined the diplomatic service.

From 1933 he served as secretary of the French embassy in Berlin. From here he joined in 1936 in the French Foreign Ministry to take over the leadership of the Germany department. In 1942, after the occupation of France by German troops during World War II, Seydoux joined the French Resistance.

After the war, he headed the French Foreign Ministry's European Department from 1949 to 1955. He then served as a French ambassador, first in Vienna, then from 1958 to 1962 and from 1965 to 1970 in Bonn.

Seydoux de Clausonne was instrumental in bringing about the Élysée Treaty. For his contributions to European integration, he was honored in 1970 with the Charlemagne Prize by the city of Aachen.
