= Jacques Seydoux =

French diplomat (1870–1929)

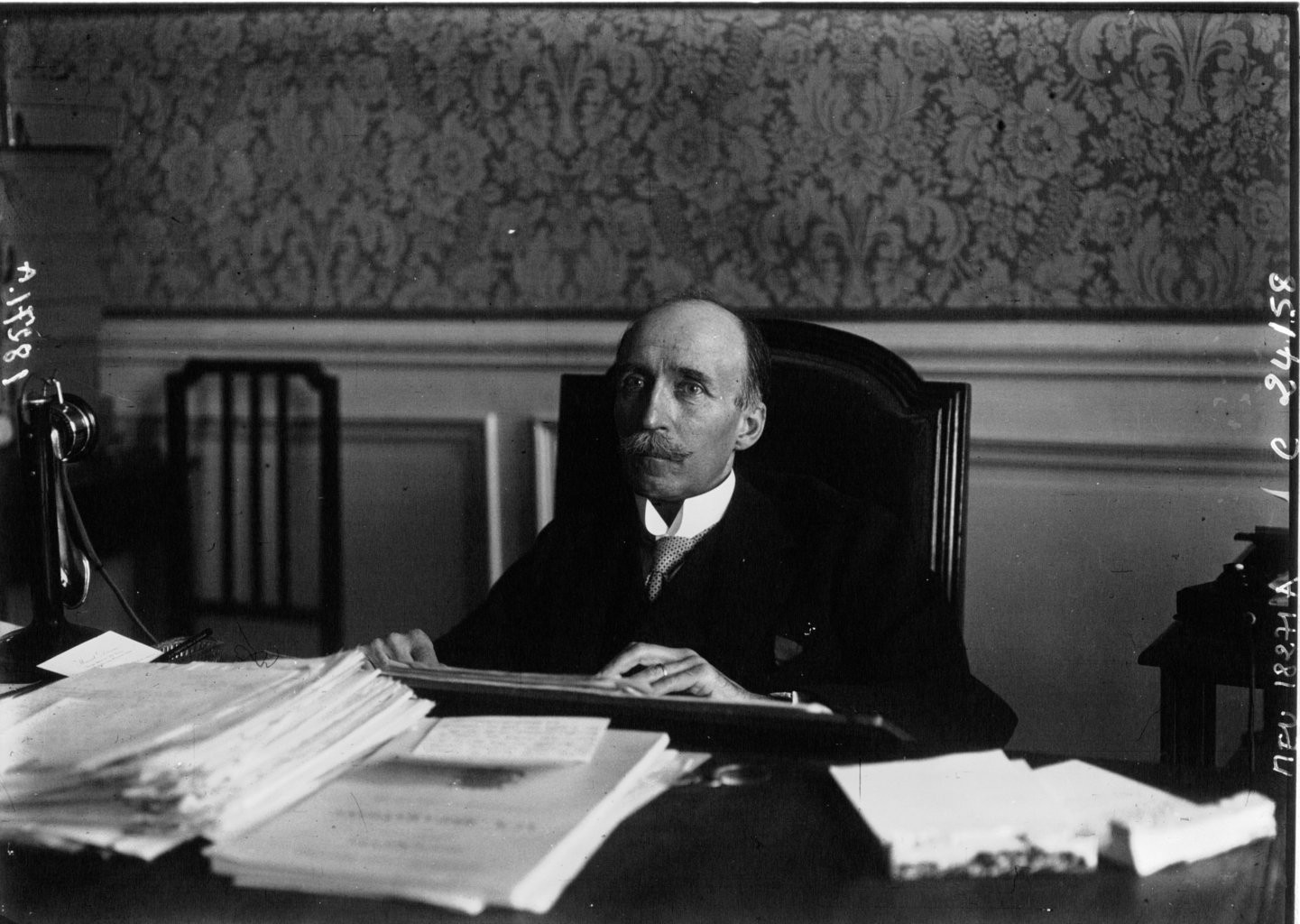
Jacques Seydoux

Charles Louis Auguste Jacques Seydoux (1870–1929) was a French diplomat, economist and Director of Commercial Relations at the French Foreign Ministry.

== Life and career ==
Seydoux was the son of Anne Elisabeth (Sers) and Louis Auguste Seydoux. He was the organiser of the Blockade Department during the First World War and was Assistant Director for Commercial Affairs from May 1919 to October 1924. He was then Deputy Director of Political and Commercial Affairs from until December 1926. He was estimated by his colleagues as the most creative thinker on political matters and he wrote every major paper on economics at the Foreign Ministry for eight years. During the 1920s he was the chief reparations expert on the French side and was firmly in favour of Franco-German economic rapprochement.

The historian Stephen Schuker called Seydoux "by far the most lucid mind among senior French bureaucrats in the 1920s...self-effacing, nonpolitical, but independent-minded who put his expertise at the service of the most diverse political superiors and managed to win the admiration of them all".

== Works ==
- De Versailles au Plan Young (Paris: Plon, 1932).
