= Eden Hazard =

Belgian footballer (born 1991)

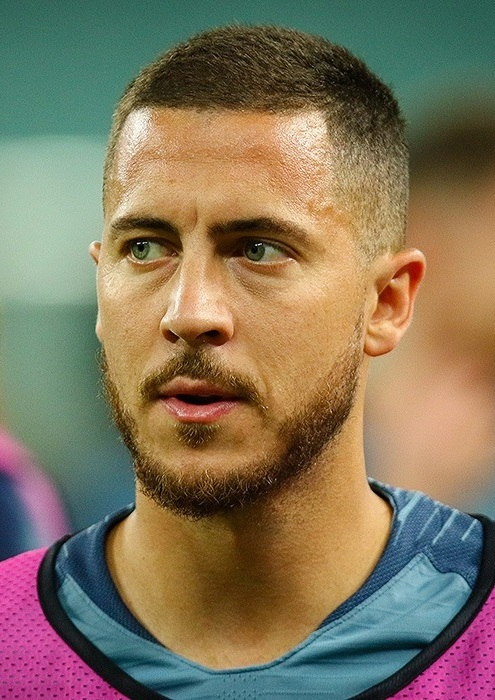
- Hazard with Chelsea in 2019

Personal information
- Full name: Eden Michael Walter Lucien Hazard
- Date of birth: 7 January 1991 (age 35)
- Place of birth: La Louvière, Belgium
- Height: 1.75 m (5 ft 9 in)
- Positions: Left winger; attacking midfielder

Youth career
- 1995–2003: Royal Stade Brainois
- 2003–2005: AFC Tubize
- 2005–2007: Lille

Senior career*
Years	Team	Apps	(Gls)
2007–2008	Lille II	13	(1)
2007–2012	Lille	147	(36)
2012–2019	Chelsea	245	(85)
2019–2023	Real Madrid	54	(4)
Total		459	(126)

International career
2006	Belgium U15	5	(1)
2006	Belgium U16	4	(2)
2006–2008	Belgium U17	17	(2)
2007–2009	Belgium U19	11	(6)
2008–2022	Belgium	126	(33)
Medal record
Men's football
Representing Belgium
FIFA World Cup
Third place	2018 Russia
- * Club domestic league appearances and goals

Eden Michael Walter Lucien Hazard (French pronunciation: [edɛn azaʁ]; born 7 January 1991) is a Belgian former professional footballer who played as a left winger or attacking midfielder. Over the span of his sixteen-year career, he played for Lille, Chelsea, and Real Madrid, and also captained the Belgium national team. Known for his dribbling, creativity, and vision, he is regarded as one of the best players of his generation and one of the greatest players in Premier League history.

Hazard began his senior career with Ligue 1 club Lille in 2007 at the age of 16, and soon became an integral part of the team under manager Rudi Garcia. In his first full season, he became the first non-French player to win the Ligue 1 Young Player of the Year award, and the following year became the first player to win the award twice. In the 2010–11 season, he won the French league and cup double and, as a result of his performances, was named the Ligue 1 Player of the Year, the youngest player to win the award.

After making 194 appearances and scoring 50 goals for Lille, Hazard signed for English club Chelsea in June 2012, winning the UEFA Europa League in his first campaign and the PFA Young Player of the Year in his second. In the 2014–15 season, Hazard helped Chelsea win the Football League Cup and Premier League, earning him the FWA Footballer of the Year and the PFA Players' Player of the Year awards. Two years later, he won his second English league title, playing a key role in Chelsea's 2016–17 Premier League triumph. In 2018, he scored the only goal in Chelsea's FA Cup win, and was included in the FIFA FIFPRO Men's World 11. He won the Europa League again with Chelsea in 2019, scoring twice in the final and being named the competition's Player of the Season. Having established himself as one of the best players in the world while in England, Hazard joined Real Madrid in the summer of 2019 in a transfer worth up to €150 million, making it one of the highest transfer fees ever. Despite lifting a UEFA Champions League title among others during his tenure in Spain, injuries, subpar performances, and a lack of fitness led to him only playing a limited number of games, departing the club in June 2023 and retiring from professional football four months later.

Having represented Belgium at various youth levels, Hazard made his debut for the senior team in November 2008, aged 17. He went on to earn 126 caps, and was a member of the Belgian squads which reached the quarter-finals of the 2014 FIFA World Cup, UEFA Euro 2016, and UEFA Euro 2020. At the 2018 FIFA World Cup, he captained Belgium to a best-ever third place finish, receiving the Silver Ball as the second-best player of the tournament. Hazard remained as the captain of the team until his international retirement following the 2022 FIFA World Cup, including for a period in which Belgium topped the FIFA men's rankings for the first time, which eventually became the longest continuous reign in first place for any European nation.

== Early life ==
Eden Michael Walter Lucien Hazard was born on 7 January 1991 in La Louvière and grew up in Braine-le-Comte. His mother Carine, and father Thierry, were both footballers. His father spent most of his career at semi-professional level with La Louvière in the Belgian Second Division, playing mainly as a defensive midfielder. His mother played as a striker in the Belgian Women's First Division and stopped playing when she was three months pregnant with Eden. After playing football, both his parents became sports teachers. Thierry retired from his position in 2009 to devote more time to his children.

Hazard is the eldest of four children. He has three brothers, all of whom play football, including Thorgan, who joined him at Chelsea in 2012. Hazard's other younger brothers are Kylian and Ethan. Hazard and his three brothers were raised in a comfortable environment with their parents ensuring they had whatever they needed to excel. The family lived "no more than three metres" from a football training ground and the brothers often ventured onto a training pitch through a small hole to hone and develop their skills. Growing up his idol was French midfielder Zinedine Zidane, with Hazard "watching him on television and online for hours".

== Club career ==
=== Early career ===
Hazard began his football career playing for his hometown club Royal Stade Brainois at the age of four. During his time at the club, one of his youth coaches described him as a "gifted" player. He added: "He knew everything. I had nothing to teach him." Hazard spent eight years at the club before moving to AFC Tubize. While at Tubize, he was spotted by a Lille scout while playing in a local tournament with the club. The scout's subsequent report on the player prompted club officials to meet with Hazard's father and offer the young player an aspirant (youth) contract.

Hazard's parents accepted the offer from Lille head of academy Jean-Michel Vandamme with hopes that the training facilities in France would be better. Hazard's father later admitted that the decision to let Eden and, later Thorgan, join clubs in the North of France was the best solution stating "They remained so close to home and, at the same time, they integrated at structures where they could grow, because in Belgium, unfortunately, it's a little empty for the training of youth."

=== Lille ===
==== Early Lille career ====
Hazard joined Lille in 2005 and spent two years developing in the club's local sports school, due to its youth academy in Luchin not being in operation at that time. On 28 May 2007, he signed his first professional contract agreeing to a three-year deal with Lille. At the start of the 2007–08 season, at the age of 16, Hazard was promoted to the club's reserve team in the Championnat de France Amateur, the fourth level of French football, though he still played with Lille's under-18 team in its league and the Coupe Gambardella. Hazard made his amateur debut on 1 September 2007 in a league match against Racing Club de France. appearing as a second-half substitute in a 3–1 defeat. He made his first start a week later in the team's 1–0 defeat to Lesquin.

After spending the majority of October and the early part of November playing with the club's under-18 team, on 14 November, due to several players being on international duty, Hazard was called up to the senior team by manager Claude Puel to participate in a friendly against Belgian club Club Brugge on 16 November. He appeared as a substitute in the match and, as a result of his performance, was included in the 18-man squad to face Nancy in a league match on 24 November, where he subsequently made his professional debut in the match, coming on as a substitute in the 78th minute.

Hazard returned to the club's reserve team and spent December playing with the squad. Following the winter break, Hazard returned to the first team in January and made substitute appearances in three league matches against Metz, Sochaux, and Paris Saint-Germain. Following the match against PSG, he was demoted back to amateur level where he played concurrently with the reserve team in the fourth division and the under-18 team in the Coupe Gambardella. On 17 May 2008, he scored his first amateur goal in a 3–2 victory over Vitré. Hazard finished his amateur career with 11 appearances and one goal, helping the reserve team finished in fifth place, which was first among professional clubs' reserve teams playing in the group.

==== 2008–2010: Debut season and individual success ====
Hazard was promoted to the first team permanently by new manager Rudi Garcia ahead of the 2008–09 season. Early on, he made substitute appearances regularly, including against Auxerre on 20 September, when he scored a goal to make it 2–2 in the 88th minute in a game Lille won 3–2 in stoppage time following a goal from Túlio de Melo. Hazard's first career goal resulted in him becoming the youngest goalscorer in the club's history. Four days after scoring his first goal, Hazard made his first senior start in a 4–2 defeat on penalties to Montpellier in the Coupe de la Ligue. After featuring as a substitute in the team's next five league matches, on 15 November, Hazard started his first league game against Saint-Étienne, and capped the appearance by scoring the opening goal in the club's 3–0 victory. His assured performances with the club resulted in Lille offering him a three-year contract extension, which he agreed to on 18 November 2008, tying him to the club until 2012.

After featuring as a substitute in December, Hazard returned to the starting lineup in January. In February, he scored the match-winning goal in a league match against Sochaux. In the Round of 16 of the Coupe de France, Hazard netted a goal in a 3–2 win over the competition's defending champions Lyon. In the final ten league matches of the campaign, Hazard started eight and contributed to the team finishing in fifth place, which resulted in Lille qualifying for the UEFA Europa League. After the season, he was named the Ligue 1 Young Player of the Year, becoming the first non-French player to achieve the honour.

Following the 2008–09 season, constant media speculation occurred in numerous countries regarding Hazard's availability on the transfer market. Despite Lille chairman Michel Seydoux declaring the player off limits and Hazard stating that he wanted to remain at the club for at least another season, several clubs declared interest in the player. These included English clubs Arsenal and Manchester United, Italian club Inter Milan, and Spanish clubs Barcelona and Real Madrid. Frenchman Zinedine Zidane personally recommended the player to the latter club.

Hazard began the 2009–10 season on a positive note scoring in Lille's first competitive match of the season. The goal, contributing to the team's 2–0 victory, came against Serbian club FK Sevojno in the first leg of the club's third qualifying round tie in the Europa League. On 27 August, he scored his second career European goal in the club's second leg tie in the play-off round against Belgian club Genk. It was Lille's final goal in the club's 4–2 victory. The 6–3 aggregate scoreline assured the club progression to the Europa League group stage.

On 22 October, Hazard scored a goal in Lille's important 3–0 victory over Italian club Genoa in the 84th minute after entering as a substitute 10 minutes prior. Upon receiving the ball on the left wing, Hazard proceeded to dash through the midfield dribbling past six Genoa defenders before finishing at the 18-yard box. A month later, Hazard was instrumental in Lille's 5–1 thrashing of Czech club Slavia Prague as he was partly responsible for the opening goal, slicing through the defence and delivering a cross near post, which went off Slavia player Marek Suchý resulting in an own goal.

On 20 December, Hazard scored his first league goal of the season in the club's 3–0 win over Le Mans, as well as assisting the other two. On 30 January, Hazard scored the only goal in Lille's win over Derby du Nord rivals Lens. Five days later, Hazard and Lille reached an agreement on a contract extension, which will keep the player at the club until 2014. On 11 March, Hazard scored the only goal in Lille's victory over English club Liverpool in the first leg of the club's Europa League tie, converting a free kick in the 83rd minute. Three weeks later, Hazard provided two assists in the club's 4–1 win over title rivals Montpellier. For his impressive displays in the month of March, Hazard was given the UNFP Player of the Month award.

On 29 April, Hazard was nominated for the Ligue 1 Player of the Year award. He was also nominated, for the second consecutive season, for the Young Player of the Year award. On 9 May, Hazard was awarded the Young Player of the Year trophy for the second consecutive season. He became the first player since its inception in 1994 to win the award twice. Hazard lost out on the Player of the Year award, which was awarded to Lyon striker Lisandro López.

==== 2010–2011: League double, Ligue 1 Player of the Year and continued individual success ====
Hazard began the 2010–11 campaign as a starter featuring in Lille's first six league matches of the season, as well as matches in the Europa League. On 29 August, he scored his first goal of the season in a 1–1 draw with Nice. In late September, Hazard began to struggle with inconsistency and was benched by Garcia in an effort to "allow him to breathe and learn that his performances were insufficient". Hazard later admitted that his first bout of inconsistency affected him stating "The first two months were a bit tough. I wouldn't say that I began doubting my abilities, but I definitely went through a really patchy spell."

On 7 October, Belgium national team manager Georges Leekens, citing Hazard's recent spell on the bench at Lille, said that the player needed to work harder, both physically and mentally, to regain his past year's form. The team's assistant coach, Marc Wilmots, also stated that Hazard often displayed a lazy mentality while training with the national team. Garcia responded to Leekens comments the following day stating that he thought they were "excessive" and that "Eden is only 19 years old" and can still "make more progress in all areas". Following Belgium's match against Kazakhstan, in which Hazard failed to start or even appear on the substitute's bench, Leekens responded to Garcia's comments declaring that he would stand by his previous comments and that players must think about the team and not themselves. Hazard, himself, later reflected on Leekens and Garcia comments in February 2011 stating "I learned a lot during those few weeks, mentally speaking. And since then things have got better. The national side has had a fair bit to do with that – I get a lot out of being a part of it."

Following the international break, he scored his second league goal of the season in a 3–1 win against the league leaders Brest. On 21 November, Hazard assisted both Lille's goals in a 2–1 win over Monaco. The victory continued the club's domestic unbeaten streak, which led to Lille topping the league table following an emphatic 6–3 victory against Lorient on 5 December. At the turn of the calendar year, Hazard scored in the team's first match against amateur club Forbach in the Coupe de France. Lille won the match 3–1. In the team's following match, he assisted goals scored by Moussa Sow and Gervinho in a 2–0 league victory over Nice.

On 19 January, Hazard scored the second goal in a 3–0 victory over Nancy. On 4 March, Lille officials confirmed that Hazard had signed a new contract until 2015, a deal which also made him the highest paid player in Ligue 1. In his first match after the news, Hazard scored the opening goal in Lille's 2–1 away win over title rivals Marseille. The goal was scored on a left-footed shot from almost 35 metres (38 yd) out and was clocked at 95 km/h (59 mph). On 2 April, Hazard capped his 100th league appearance with Lille by scoring the second goal in a 3–1 win over Caen. The goal tied his career-high for goals in a season and also moved Lille eight points clear at the top of the league table. For his performances in the month of March, Hazard was named the UNFP Player of the Month for the second time in his career. On 19 April, after appearing as a first-half substitute, he scored the opening goal in Lille's 2–0 Coupe de France semi-final victory over Nice. The victory inserted the club into the 2011 Coupe de France final; the club's first appearance in the competition's final since 1955. On 7 May, Hazard converted a game-winning free-kick goal in the team's 1–0 win over Nancy. Three days later, he was nominated for the Ligue 1 Player of the Year award for the second consecutive season.

In the 2011 Coupe de France final, Hazard played 89 minutes as Lille defeated PSG 1–0 at the Stade de France. A week later, Lille clinched the Ligue 1 title by drawing 2–2 away to PSG, achieving the club's first league championship since the 1953–54 season and the club's first double since the 1945–46 season. The domestic cup and league title were the first two honours in Hazard's career. On the day after Lille won the league, Hazard was named the Ligue 1 Player of the Year, becoming the youngest player to win the award. He was also rewarded with a place in the Ligue 1 Team of the Year for the second consecutive season.

==== 2011–2012: Final season in France ====
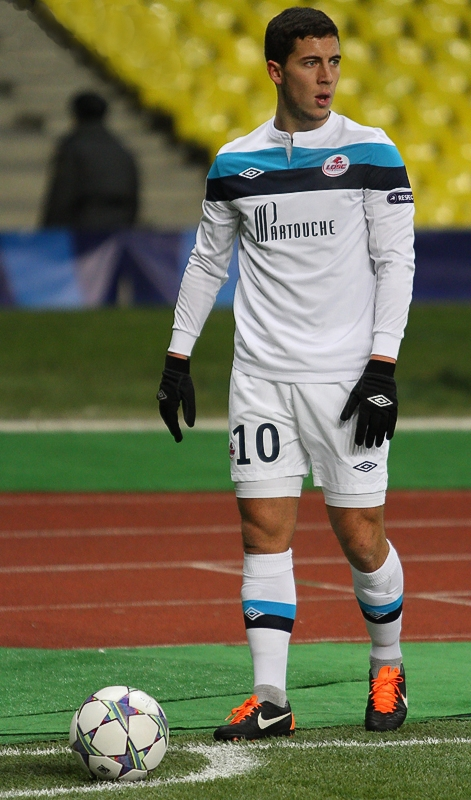
Hazard playing for Lille in 2011

In Lille's first match of the 2011–12 season against Marseille in the 2011 Trophée des Champions, Hazard scored the team's second goal, which put Lille up 2–0. Marseille would later come back to win the match 5–4. On 10 September, he scored two goals in a 3–1 away victory against Saint-Étienne. Fours days after, Hazard made his UEFA Champions League debut in a 2–2 group stage draw with Russian club CSKA Moscow.

In Lille's next league match following his Champions League debut, he converted a penalty in a 2–2 draw with Sochaux. Three days after, Hazard scored the equalising goal in a 1–1 draw against Bordeaux. After going over two months without scoring a league goal, on 3 December, Hazard came on as a substitute and scored the match-winning goal in a win over Ajaccio converting a penalty—described as an "Antonín Panenka-style chipped penalty". Two days later, Hazard was among several players nominated for UEFA's Team of the Year for the 2011 calendar year. In Lille's final match before the winter break, Hazard tied his career-high for league goals in a season by scoring the team's third goal in a 4–4 draw with Nice. After scoring the goal, Hazard celebrated by paying tribute to Molami Bokoto, a former Lille youth academy player who had died a day prior. On 3 March, Hazard scored both goals in a 2–2 draw with Auxerre.

On 18 March, Hazard scored a goal and assisted two others in a 4–0 win over local rivals Valenciennes. In Lille's next match against Evian, Hazard converted a penalty and assisted a goal by Dimitri Payet in a 3–0 win. The following week, on 1 April, Hazard converted a first-half penalty and later assisted another Payet goal to cap a 2–1 victory over Toulouse. On 15 April, Hazard marked his 100 consecutive Ligue 1 appearance, which to date, is the longest current run in the French top flight, by scoring a goal and assisting on another in a 4–1 win over Ajaccio. On 29 April, in a vital league fixture against PSG, he converted his ninth penalty of the season to draw the match at 1–1 cancelling out a goal from Javier Pastore. Hazard later contributed to Lille's game-winning goal after delivering a rabona-style cross into the box, which was laid onto the path of striker Nolan Roux who, subsequently, converted the goal to give Lille a 2–1 win.

On 28 April, for the third consecutive season, Hazard was nominated for the Ligue 1 Player of the Year award. Two weeks later, he was awarded the prestigious honour ahead of the likes of Olivier Giroud and Younès Belhanda. After capturing the award, Hazard became the second player in the awards' history after former PSG striker Pauleta to achieve the honour in consecutive seasons. He was also included in the Ligue 1 Team of the Year for the third straight season. On 20 May, Hazard appeared in his final match as a Lille player against Nancy, the club he had made his professional debut against. In the match, Hazard scored his first hat-trick in a 4–1 win.

=== Chelsea ===
==== 2012–2013: Debut season and first trophy ====
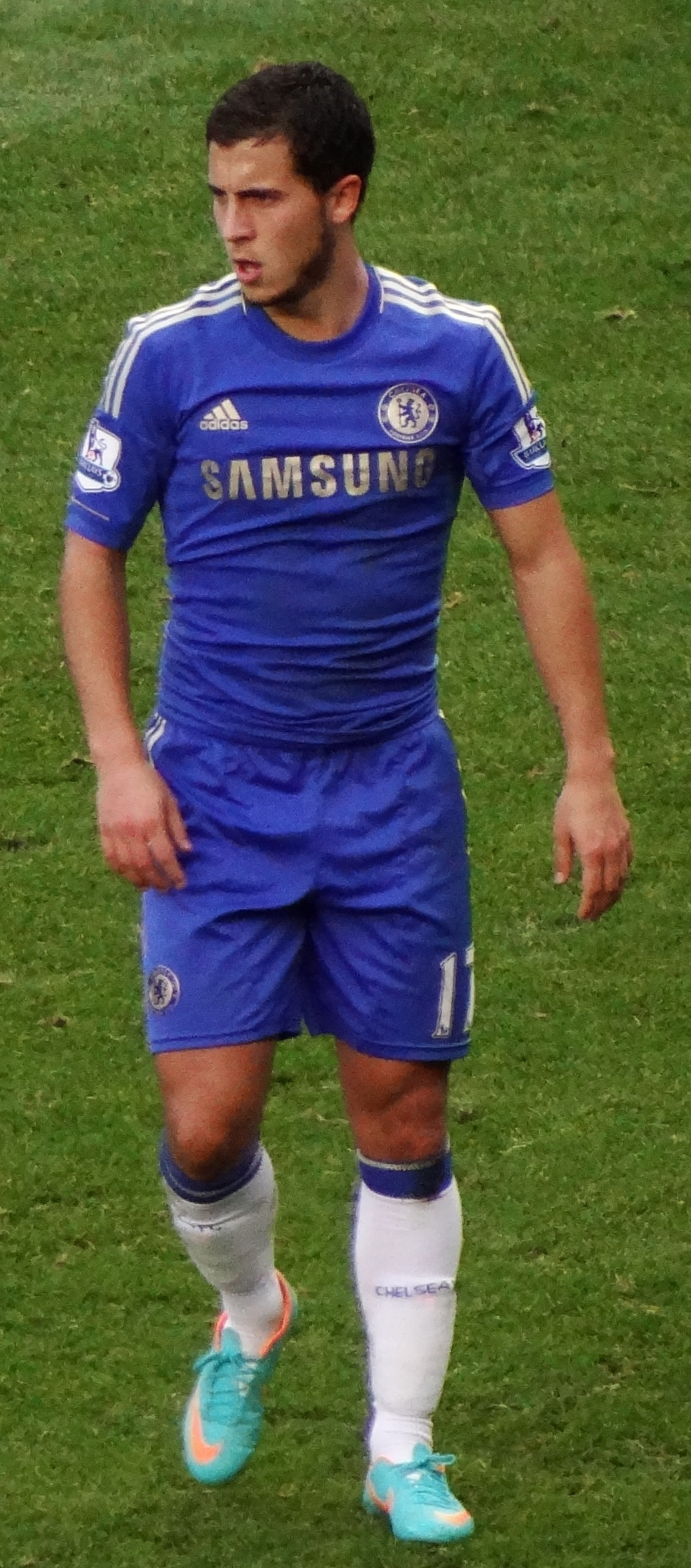
Hazard playing for Chelsea in 2012

On 4 June 2012, Premier League club Chelsea confirmed that it had agreed terms with Lille for the transfer of Hazard. He agreed personal terms with the club and passed a medical examination. The transfer fee was reported to be priced at £32 million. Upon signing, Hazard told the club's official website "I'm delighted to finally arrive here. It's a wonderful club and I can't wait to get started." On 12 August, Hazard made his debut for Chelsea in the 2012 FA Community Shield against Manchester City, which ended in a 3–2 defeat at Villa Park. A week later, he made his league debut against Wigan Athletic at the DW Stadium. In the contest, Hazard provided the assist for Branislav Ivanović's opening goal and, minutes later, won a penalty, which Frank Lampard converted, earning his side a 2–0 victory. Hazard made his home debut in the team's next fixture, against Reading on 22 August, in which he won another penalty from which Lampard converted. Hazard also assisted goals by Gary Cahill and Branislav Ivanović as Chelsea won 4–2 at home. Three days later, Hazard scored his first goal as a Chelsea player in a league match against Newcastle United after scoring a penalty. Chelsea won the match 2–0.

Hazard made his Champions League debut for Chelsea in the team's opening group stage game against Juventus on 19 September 2012. During December, he scored in back-to-back games, in a 5–1 away victory over Leeds United in the Football League Cup, and an 8–0 league win against Aston Villa. In January 2013, Hazard scored a goal with his left-foot from 25 yards in Chelsea's 4–0 win over Stoke City, as Chelsea inflicted the first home defeat of the season on Stoke. He scored again in the following game, with an impressive strike from the edge of the area in a 2–2 draw at home to Southampton. On 23 January 2013, he was sent off in the League Cup semi-final second leg game against Swansea City for kicking a ball out from underneath a ball boy who was lying on it to waste time. Chelsea went on to lose the tie 2–0. Thereafter, he told Chelsea TV that he "apologised and the boy apologised" to each other. It was later revealed that the 17-year-old ball boy had planned before the game to deliberately waste time. On 9 February, he scored on his return from suspension in a 4–1 win at home against Wigan Athletic.

On 21 February 2013, Hazard came on as a substitute against Sparta Prague and scored an individual goal in stoppage time, to send Chelsea through to the last 16 on a 2–1 aggregate score. Again Hazard came off the bench to make an impact for Chelsea, scoring a goal and providing an assist to Ramires, as the team came back 2–0 down to salvage a 2–2 draw against Manchester United in the quarter-finals of the 2012–13 FA Cup on 10 March, setting up a replay. On 17 March, Hazard put in a man of the match performance in a 2–0 home victory over West Ham United, assisting Lampard's 200th Chelsea goal, then scoring a solo goal. On 11 May, at Villa Park, Hazard was the provider of Lampard's brace against Aston Villa, which enabled Lampard to break Bobby Tambling's all-time goal scoring record for Chelsea. However an injury picked up in the same game ruled him out of the Europa League final. Hazard ended his debut campaign at Chelsea with 13 goals in all competitions.

==== 2013–2015: Premier League winner and individual success ====
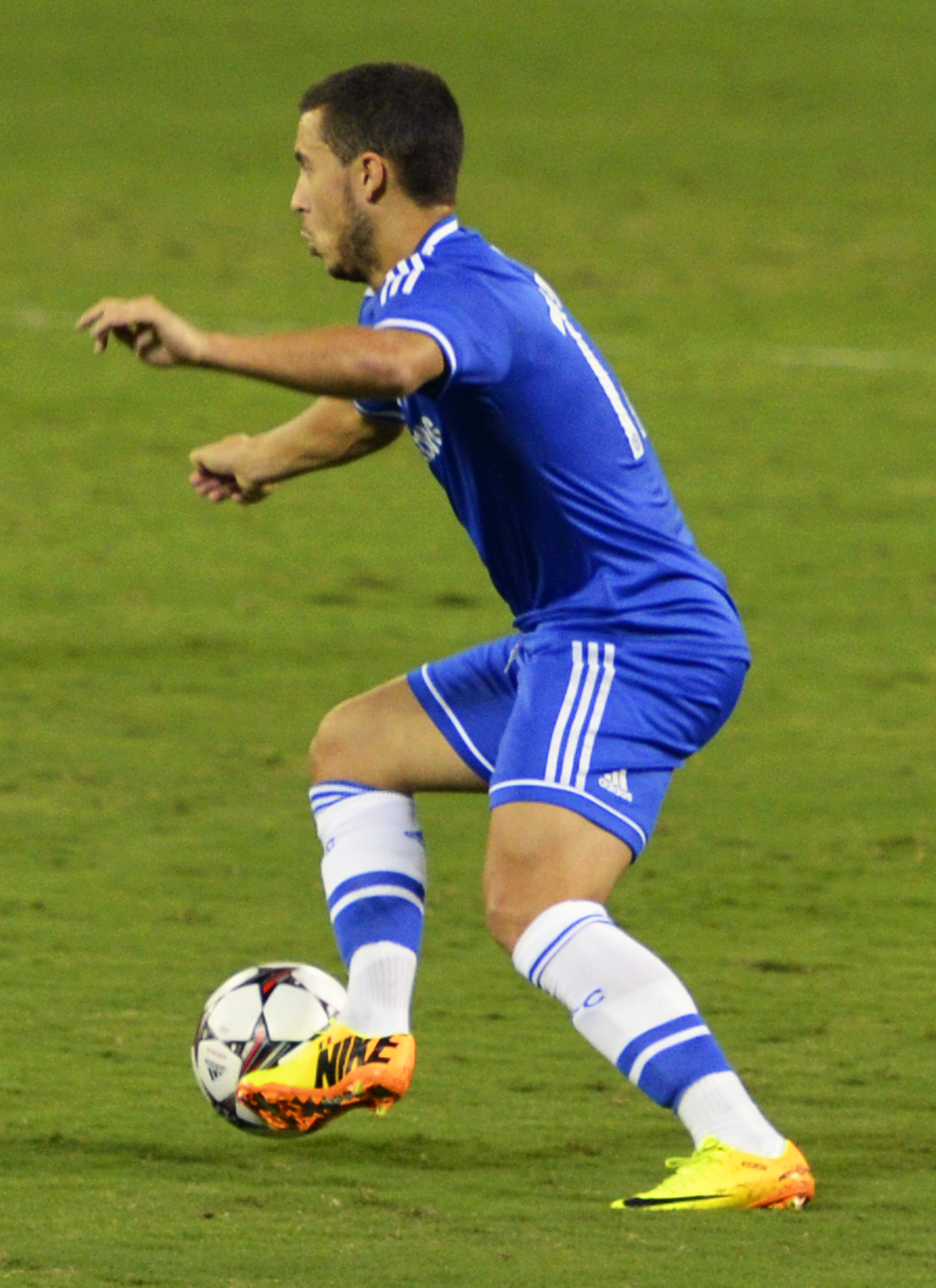
Hazard playing for Chelsea in 2013

One of Chelsea's first games of the season was against Bayern Munich in the 2013 UEFA Super Cup, in which Hazard played a vital role in the buildup to the first goal and scored the second, but went on to an eventual 5–4 defeat in the penalty shoot-out. In October 2013, Hazard scored the match-winning goal in a 3–1 away win over Norwich City in the Premier League, before scoring twice and assisting Samuel Eto'o's first Chelsea goal in a 4–1 win over of Cardiff City in the same competition. Hazard netted his fifth goal of the season against Schalke 04 in a 3–0 Champions League group stage win. In October, Hazard was part of the 23-man shortlist of players nominated for the prestigious FIFA Ballon d'Or, awarded to the player who is voted the men's world footballer of the year.

On 9 November 2013, Hazard created Chelsea's first goal against West Bromwich Albion, which was scored by Eto'o. Later in the match Chelsea went 2–1 down, but Hazard scored a last minute penalty to clinch a point for his team. On 4 December, Hazard scored a brace in a 4–3 away victory over Sunderland, with coach José Mourinho stating that Hazard delivered his best performance of the season. Sunderland manager Gus Poyet also praised Hazard for his individual impact on the game, saying he was "outstanding. He was unplayable, as a manager I haven't come up against anyone like that." After Hazard maintained his excellent form in Chelsea's 1–0 away victory over Manchester City on 3 February 2014, Mourinho described Hazard as the best young footballer in the world. Hazard scored his first Premier League hat-trick against Newcastle United at home on 8 February.

On 27 April 2014, Hazard won the PFA Young Player of the Year award and finished as the runner-up to Luis Suárez for the PFA Players' Player of the Year award for his fine attacking performances under José Mourinho. After Chelsea's Champions League exit against Atlético Madrid, Hazard said that Chelsea were only set up to counter-attack. Mourinho responded by saying that Hazard "is not so mentally ready" to help his defence, blaming him for the first goal scored by the opponents. In May, Hazard was voted Chelsea's Player of the Year in his second season at the club.

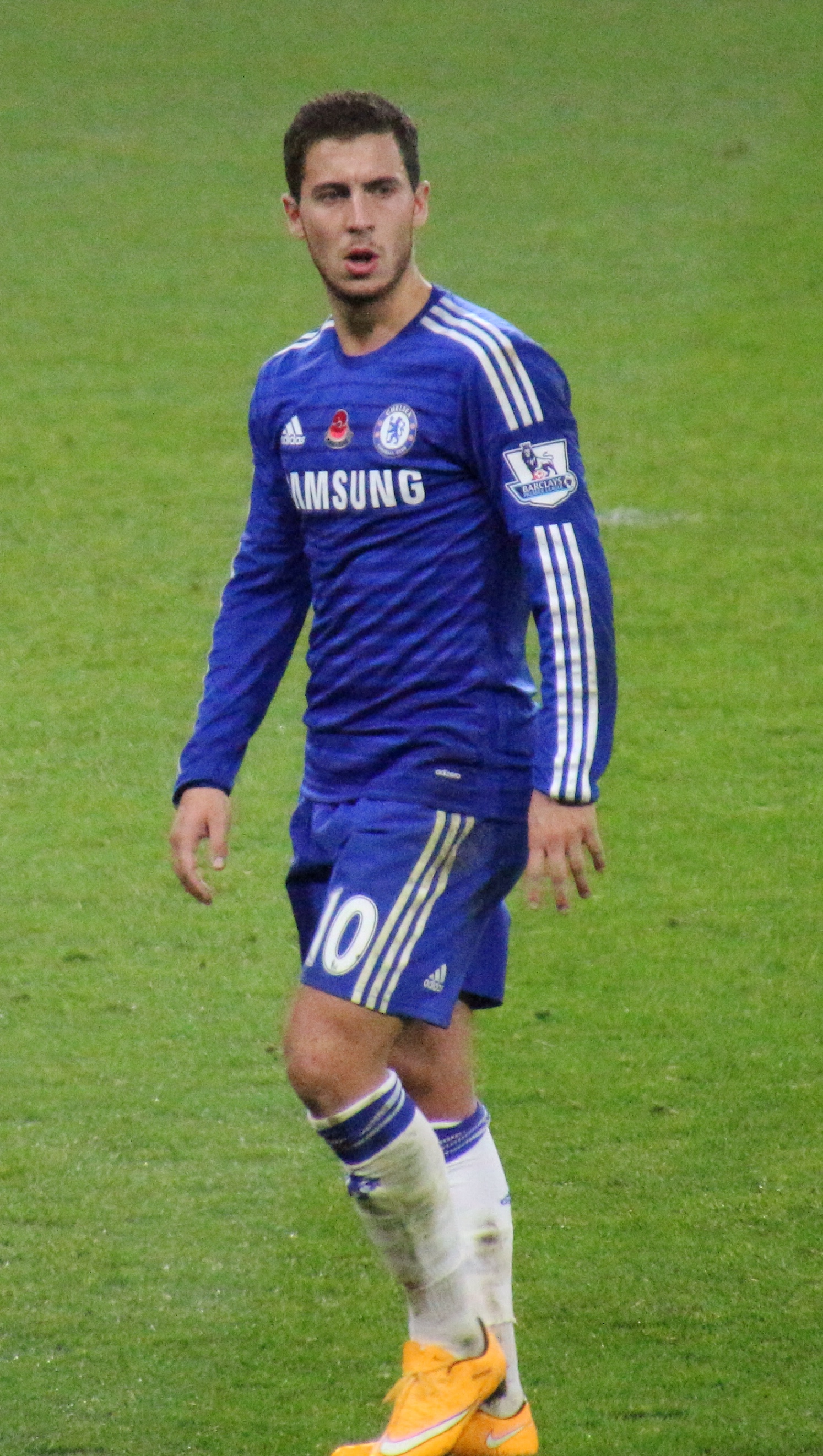
Hazard playing for Chelsea in 2014

On 5 October 2014, he won a penalty against Arsenal after being fouled by Laurent Koscielny, and then converted it himself past Wojciech Szczęsny to open a 2–0 victory which made Chelsea the last unbeaten team in the league. In doing so, he maintained his 100% penalty record out of 16 penalties. He also became the only player in Europe who has taken more than 15 penalties and scored all of them. His first goals of the 2014–15 Champions League campaign came on 21 October, scoring from the penalty-spot and from open play in a 6–0 home win over Maribor. On 5 November, away to the Slovene team, he earned an 85th-minute penalty but had it saved by Jasmin Handanović in a 1–1 draw. Hazard opened the scoring in Chelsea's 2–0 win over Hull on 13 December, with the goal being only the second headed one of his entire career. The header came as a surprised for many, even Mourinho, who stated: "That he scored in the air, I was surprised. He jumps a lot but normally he closes his eyes. So I was surprised, but very good goal."

Hazard signed a new five-and-a-half-year contract with Chelsea on 12 February 2015. After signing, Hazard said: "I've signed a new contract and I'm very happy because I'm playing for one of the best clubs in the world." He played in the club's 2–0 win over Tottenham on 1 March in the 2015 League Cup final at Wembley Stadium. As a result of Hazard's impressive performances throughout the 2014–15 season, his manager declared him "one of the top three players in the world". On 26 April, Hazard was recognised as the best player of the season among his peers, winning the PFA Players' Player of the Year award. A week later, he scored the only goal as Chelsea defeated Crystal Palace to win their first Premier League title since 2010. He won a penalty after being fouled by James McArthur, and took it himself, heading in the rebound after it was saved by Julián Speroni. On 26 May, Hazard was voted as Chelsea's Player of the Year for the second year in a row. There are only four other players that have done it in the past; Juan Mata, Frank Lampard, Ray Wilkins, and John Hollins.

==== 2015–2016: Year of scrutiny ====
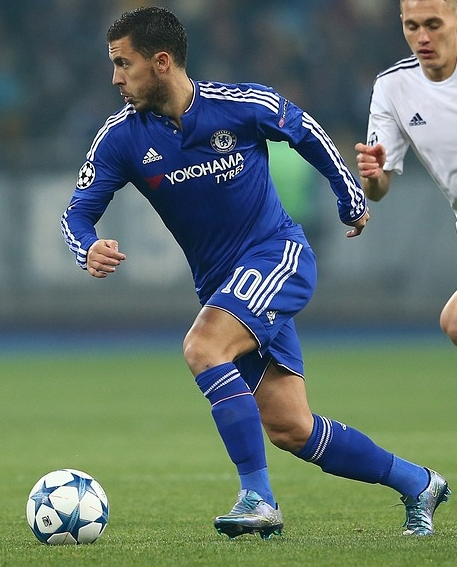
Hazard playing for Chelsea in 2015

Hazard endured a difficult start to the 2015–16 season, missing a penalty in the Champions League group stage against Maccabi Tel Aviv. On 27 October, in the fourth round of the League Cup away to Stoke, Hazard was the only player to miss in Chelsea's penalty shootout elimination, his attempt being saved by Jack Butland. Hazard endured a 2,358-minute scoreless run across 30 matches until 31 January 2016, when he scored from the penalty spot, his 50th goal for Chelsea in all competitions, in a 5–1 win over Milton Keynes Dons in the fourth round of the FA Cup.

In February, Hazard was scrutinised when he said it would "be difficult to say no" to a move to Paris Saint-Germain. He remained scoreless in the league until 23 April, when he recorded two goals in a 4–1 victory away to AFC Bournemouth; after the result, interim manager Guus Hiddink insisted that Hazard would remain at Chelsea by next season. For the second consecutive campaign, Hazard scored the goal that decided the Premier League; he came on as a substitute at home to Tottenham on 2 May, and scored an equaliser as Chelsea came from 2–0 down at half-time to draw. The result meant Leicester City won the title at Tottenham's expense. On 11 May 2016, Hazard scored his fourth and final league goal of the season against Liverpool, although Chelsea were unable to hold on to the lead, with fellow countryman Christian Benteke scoring in extra time as the match finished in a 1–1 draw.

==== 2016–2018: Return to form, Premier League winner and first FA Cup win ====
On 15 August 2016, in Chelsea's opening Premier League match of the season, Hazard scored a penalty in a 2–1 win over West Ham United. Hazard recorded a total of 81 touches throughout the game, and his performance earned him the man of the match award. On 27 August, Hazard contributed another man of the match display in the 3–0 victory over Burnley, scoring the opener in the ninth minute. After voting ended on 5 September, Hazard received the most votes from the public poll, 41%, for the Premier League Player of the Month award although Raheem Sterling was later named the Player of the Month by a Premier League panel.

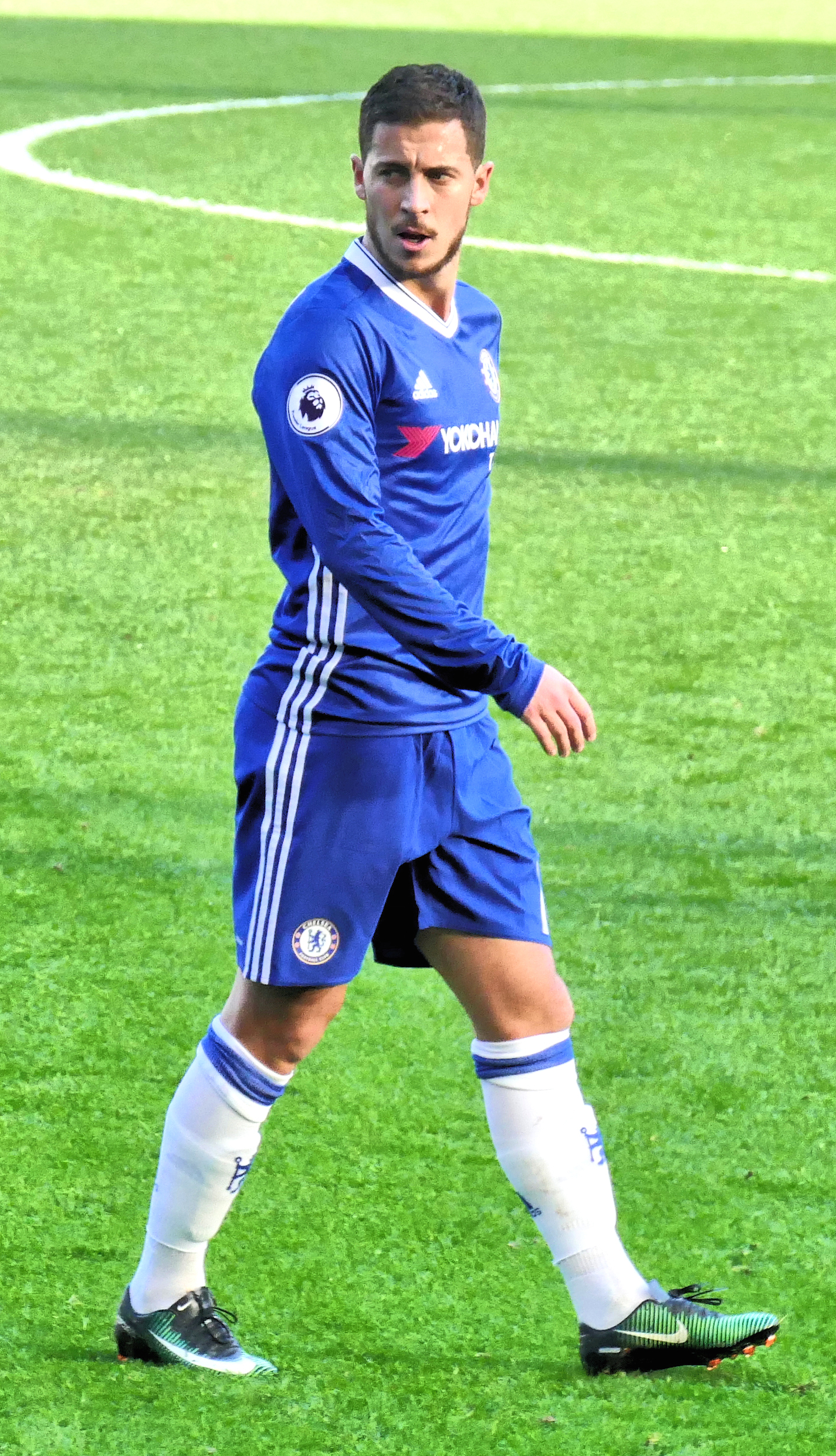
Hazard playing for Chelsea in 2016

On 15 October 2016, Hazard, along with teammate Diego Costa, dedicated their goals to Willian, whose mother had died earlier that week, in the 3–0 victory over then-reigning league champions Leicester City. On 23 October, he scored his fourth goal of the season in a 4–0 win over former Chelsea manager, José Mourinho's Manchester United, equalling the number of league goals he managed in the previous season. Hazard continued his excellent form, scoring the first goal and assisting the second in Chelsea's 2–0 win over Southampton on 30 October. This marked the first time that he had scored in three consecutive Premier League games. His run of form continued into the next match as he scored two goals and assisted another in Chelsea's 5–0 home win against Everton on 5 November. Hazard's performance against Everton earned him another man of the match award, his third in a row in the Premier League. On 18 November, Hazard was named the Premier League Player of the Month for October.

Hazard led Chelsea to their twelfth consecutive league victory on 26 December 2016 in a 3–0 victory over Bournemouth, which was a new club record. He also converted a penalty for his 50th Premier League goal, making him the sixth Chelsea player to achieve this feat. On 20 April 2017, Hazard was named in the PFA Team of the Year for the fourth time in his five seasons at Chelsea. Two days later, he scored after coming on as a substitute in Chelsea's 4–2 FA Cup semi-final victory over rivals Tottenham Hotspur at Wembley Stadium.

At the beginning of the summer of 2017, Hazard suffered an ankle injury in training during international duty. The injury ruled him out for six to eight weeks; missing the entire preseason and the Premier League opener. On 25 August, Hazard returned to action, playing 75 minutes for the Chelsea U23 side. On 28 October, Hazard scored his first league goal of the season in a 1–0 win against Bournemouth in the Premier League. On 3 January 2018, Hazard scored in a 2–2 draw with rivals Arsenal. Two goals against Brighton & Hove Albion on 20 January made it 100 league goals in his career. Hazard's double helped Chelsea to a 4–0 win at Falmer Stadium. On 12 February, Hazard scored a double in a 3–0 win over West Bromwich Albion.

In the 2018 FA Cup final on 19 May, Hazard won a penalty which he took and scored in the 22nd minute, and this proved to be the winning goal as Chelsea beat Manchester United 1–0.

==== 2018–2019: Final season in England ====
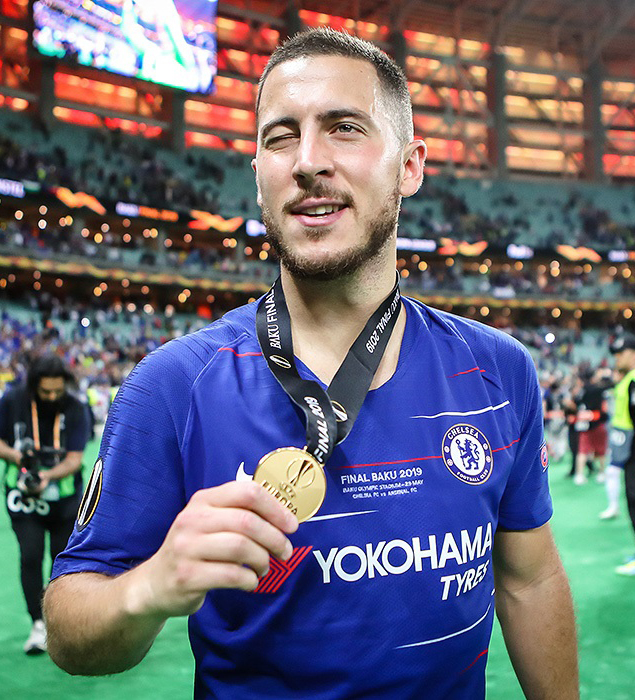
Hazard after winning the 2019 UEFA Europa League final with Chelsea

Hazard scored on his first start of the 2018–19 season, converting a penalty in a 2–1 win against Newcastle United on 26 August 2018. He came off the bench to give Chelsea a 2–1 win over Liverpool in the third round of the EFL Cup at Anfield on 26 September, which was his sixth goal in seven appearances to start the season. In the next fixture, against Liverpool in the Premier League, he made it seven goals in eight games, opening the scoring in a 1–1 draw at home. His five league goals in September 2018, including goals against Bournemouth, Cardiff and Liverpool, led to him winning the Premier League Player of the Month. On 16 December, Hazard scored and assisted a goal for Pedro as Chelsea won 2–1 away to Brighton & Hove Albion in the league, before coming off the bench to send Chelsea through to the EFL Cup semi-final at the expense of Bournemouth three days later. He scored both goals in a 2–1 away win against Watford on 26 December, the first of which was his 100th Chelsea and 150th club career goal.

On 8 April 2019, Hazard scored a solo goal against West Ham United which would be voted as Premier League Goal of the Month for April. On 9 May 2019, Hazard scored the decisive penalty in a 4–3 shootout win over Eintracht Frankfurt at home to send Chelsea to the Europa League final. His tally of 15 assists for the 2018–19 Premier League season saw him win the competition's Playmaker of the Season award. On 29 May, Chelsea won the 2018–19 Europa League with a 4–1 win over Arsenal in the final, in which Hazard scored twice, also assisting Pedro's goal. After the match, Hazard expressed his desire to leave Chelsea after seven years at the club, stating that he "want[ed] a new challenge". He was included in the ESM Team of the Season for his performances in the 2018–19 season, as well as the FIFA FIFPRO Men's World 11 for 2018 and 2019. He also won the PFA Fans' Player of the Year award as well as every individual Chelsea award, the only player in the club's history to do so.

=== Real Madrid ===
==== 2019–2021: Fitness struggles and decline in form ====
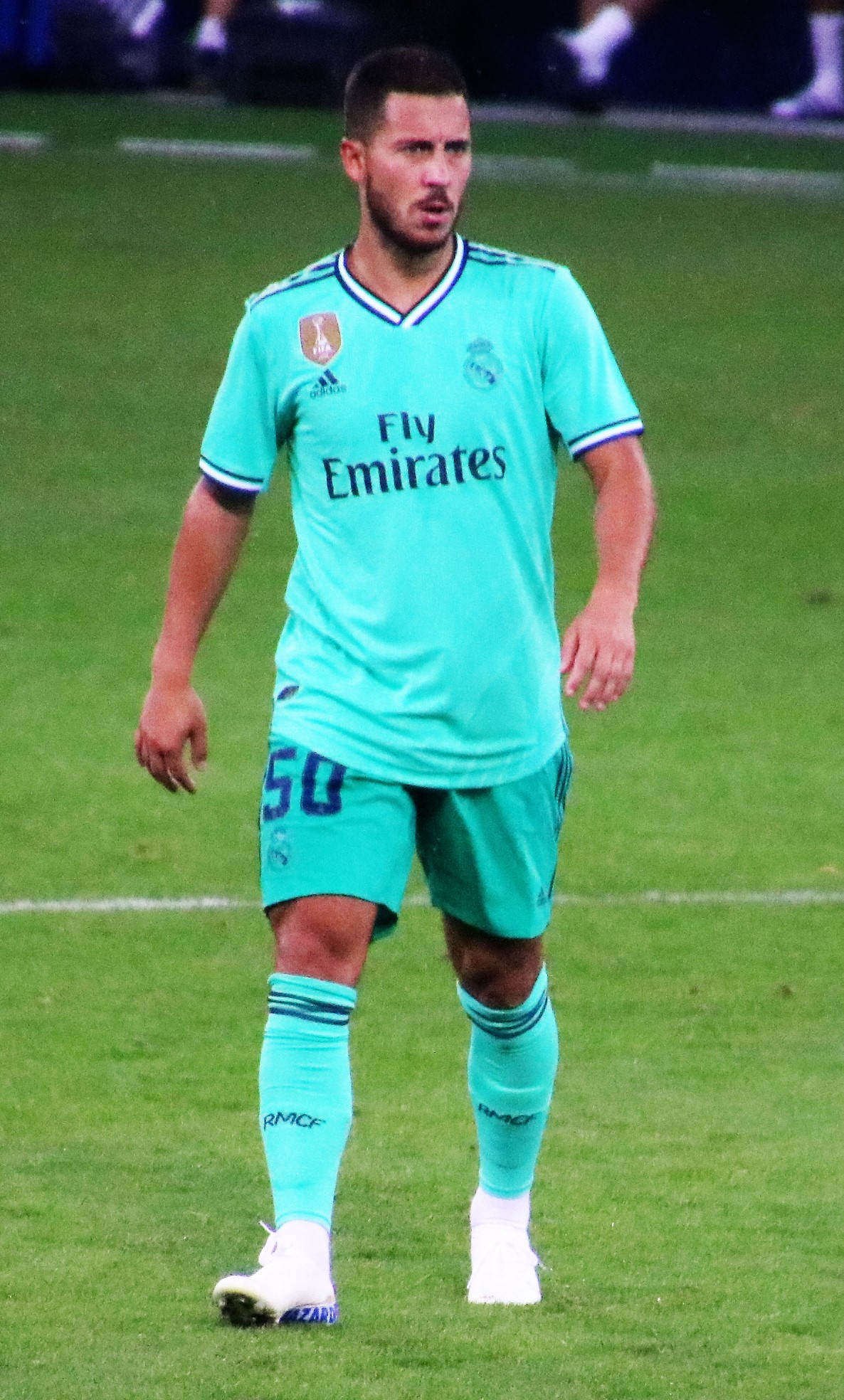
Hazard playing for Real Madrid in 2019

On 7 June 2019, La Liga club Real Madrid announced on their website that Hazard would be signing for them for the 2019–20 season. He signed a contract until 30 June 2024 for a reported fee of €100 million, which could rise to €146.1 million due to additional fees, on a deal worth £400,000 per week. Hazard became Madrid's most expensive player after Gareth Bale, who was signed for €101 million in 2013, and, depending on certain variables being met, the club's most expensive player in its history. Hazard was formally unveiled in front of 50,000 fans on 13 June 2019 at the Santiago Bernabéu. Upon signing with Madrid, Hazard said, "I've dreamt about this since I was little, I always supported Real Madrid" and described it as "a true honour". He listed manager Zinedine Zidane as a defining factor in making the move, as he had always been an admirer of him.

Having arrived at training camp out of shape, Hazard made his debut on 14 September 2019, coming on as a substitute in a 3–2 home victory over Levante in the 2019–20 La Liga. On 5 October, he scored his first competitive goal for Los Blancos, right before half time against Granada in his first home league start. In the second half, he also got his first assist which was to Modrić in an eventual 4–2 victory. Despite a slow start to life in the Spanish capital, Hazard eventually rediscovered his form, completing 38 dribbles and giving two assists in six matches, but this streak, which began in the 5–0 victory over Leganés on 30 October, ended when he suffered a microfracture to his right ankle on 26 November in the Champions League group stage game against Paris Saint-Germain after a challenge by Thomas Meunier. Hazard went on to miss 16 Madrid matches across four competitions, which included the first El Clásico of the season, the Supercopa de España victory in Jeddah and the entire Copa del Rey campaign which ended with a quarter-final exit to Sociedad. At the end of the season he had made 16 league appearances, scoring one goal and assisting six, as Madrid won the 2019–20 La Liga.

On 31 October 2020, Hazard scored his first club goal in over a year, which was also his first goal of the 2020–21 season in Madrid's 4–1 home league win over Huesca. On 25 November, he scored his first Champions League goal with Madrid in a 2–0 away win against Inter Milan. On 23 January 2021, Hazard scored in a 4–1 away win at Alavés. On 5 May 2021, Hazard apologised following criticism for laughing with former teammates Kurt Zouma and Édouard Mendy after Real Madrid's 3–1 aggregate defeat to Chelsea in the Champions League semi-final. Four days later, he scored his first goal in over three months, a backheel goal against Sevilla in the sixth minute of stoppage time, which temporarily kept Madrid in the title race.

==== 2021–2023: Continued struggle, departure, and retirement ====
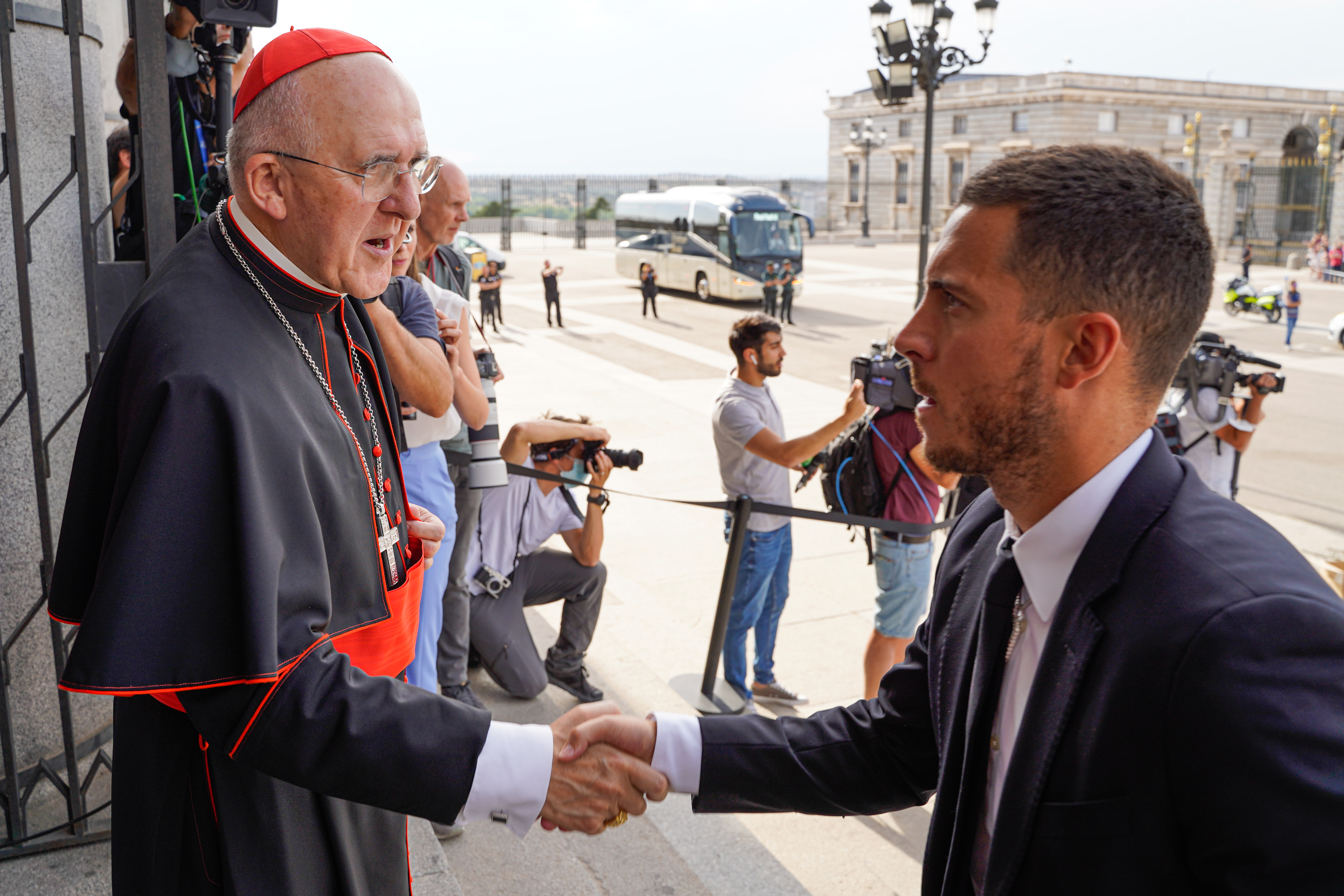
Hazard shaking hands with Cardinal Carlos Osoro Sierra in 2022

In the 2021–22 season, Hazard was playing respectably well early in the season, but faced competition from Vinícius Júnior, causing him to be pushed to the periphery of Carlo Ancelotti's main starting eleven. Hazard's relationship with Ancelotti would decline later on in the season. Hazard then suffered from a minor knock and gastroenteritis. On 20 January 2022, Hazard scored his first goal of the season, a 115th–minute winner against Elche to send Real Madrid to the quarter–finals of the Copa del Rey. On 25 March, Real Madrid announced that he would undergo surgery to remove the osteosynthesis plate in his right fibula. On 30 April, Hazard won his second La Liga title with Real Madrid following a 4–0 home win against Espanyol. On 28 May, he won his first Champions League title after Real Madrid beat Liverpool 1–0 in the final; he remained an unused substitute throughout the match.

At the start of the 2022–23 season, Hazard was motivated to turn things around, as his previous seasons at Madrid were unconvincing. On 6 September 2022, Hazard assisted Luka Modrić and later scored his 200th career goal in his first Champions League game of the season in a 3–0 away victory against Celtic. Despite the promising start to the campaign, it was followed by subpar performances against the likes of Mallorca, Shakhtar Donetsk, or even fourth-tier Cacereño in the Copa del Rey, and Hazard was now definitely confined to the bench; the goal against Celtic would prove to be his last career goal. In March 2023, Hazard revealed that his relationship with Ancelotti has "completely broken down," and that the two "don't talk to each other." On 3 June, Hazard and Real Madrid reached a mutual agreement to terminate his contract at the end of the season, ending his time at the club after four seasons. His run saw him score just 7 goals and assist only 12 times in 76 appearances across all competitions throughout his time at the Spanish capital, with many labelling him as "the greatest flop in Real Madrid history" and "one of the worst transfers ever."

On 10 October 2023, Hazard announced his decision to retire from professional football at age 32.

== International career ==
=== 2006–2009: Youth career ===
Hazard played for various Belgian national youth teams, such as the under-17 and under-19 teams. With the under-17 team, he was a regular in the team making 17 appearances and scoring two goals. He played with the team in the Toto Cup, a yearly international youth tournament held in Austria and, also, played in the 2007 UEFA European Under-17 Championship, which Belgium hosted. In the tournament, Hazard scored his only goal in the team's opening match against the Netherlands converting a penalty in a 2–2 draw. The match was a homecoming for Hazard, as it was played in Tubize, where he spent part of his youth career. Throughout the tournament, Hazard impressed media and coaches, which led to many in Belgium comparing him to Belgian football legend Enzo Scifo.

Belgium suffered elimination in the semi-finals of the competition, losing to Spain 7–6 on penalties. Belgium were minutes away from a victory, courtesy of an own goal from David Rochela, which Hazard was particularly instrumental in, however Barcelona striker Bojan Krkić equalised for his nation to send the match into extra time. Due to finishing in third place at the tournament, Belgium qualified for the 2007 FIFA U-17 World Cup, held in South Korea. Hazard was selected to participate and played in all three group stage matches, where Belgium were eliminated.

After playing at the FIFA U-17 World Cup in August and September 2007, Hazard began earning call-ups to the under-19 team the following month in October. His first appearance came in a 2008 UEFA European Under-19 Championship qualification match against Romania coming on as a substitute in a 4–0 victory. He subsequently played in the next two group stage matches against Iceland and England. Belgium lost both matches. The negative results eliminated the country from the tournament. Due to being an underage player the previous year, Hazard was eligible for the under-19 team for the 2008–09 season. Due to his growing participation with Lille's first team, Hazard was only allowed to play in 2009 UEFA European Under-19 Championship qualification matches by his club and, as a result, missed the 2008 edition of the Milk Cup, which was held during Lille's preseason.

On 7 October 2008, Hazard scored his first under-19 goal in the team's 5–0 victory over Estonia. Three days later, he scored a double in a 2–2 draw with Croatia. In the elite qualification round, Hazard led the team in goals scoring three. In the opening match against the Republic of Ireland, he scored the lone goal. In the next match, Hazard was influential in the team's 5–0 win over Sweden scoring a goal and assisting on two others. In the team's final match, they faced Switzerland. Belgium needed an outright victory to reach the 2009 European Under-19 Championship, but were eliminated from qualifying after drawing 1–1, despite Hazard opening the scoring for Belgium in the 21st minute.

=== 2009–2011: Early international career and first major tournaments ===
On 18 November 2008, Hazard was called up to the Belgium senior team, for the first time, by manager René Vandereycken for the team's match against Luxembourg. Prior to making his national team debut with Belgium, Hazard was courted by French Football Federation officials who sought the player to play for the France national team as he had become eligible for French citizenship. Hazard did not respond to the courtship and later stated "Because of my presence in France for seven years, I feel 99% Belgian and 1% French, but the idea of French citizenship has never crossed my mind."

Hazard made his highly anticipated debut for Belgium in the match against Luxembourg coming on as a substitute in the 67th minute for Wesley Sonck. On his debut, Hazard became the eighth youngest international player in Belgian football history, at 17 years and 316 days. On 12 August 2009, after three consecutive substitute appearances with the team, he made his first start under coach Franky Vercauteren in the team's 3–1 friendly loss to the Czech Republic. Following the resignation of Vercauteren, he was replaced with manager Dick Advocaat. Under Advocaat, Hazard became a starter in the team and, on 14 November 2009, played a full match for the first time in his international career. In the match, which was played against Hungary, Hazard assisted two goals in a 3–0 win.

In May 2010, Advocaat was replaced as manager by Georges Leekens. After featuring as a starter in Leekens first three matches in charge, Hazard began appearing as a substitute for Belgium during the 2010–11 season. Leekens justified his benching of Hazard citing the players' domestic performance, which had been underwhelming at the time, while also admitting that Hazard displayed a lack of desire in training with the national team and often neglected his defensive duties during international matches. After appearing as a substitute in two straight matches, Hazard returned to the starting lineup for the team's November 2010 friendly against Russia. In the match, which Belgium won 2–0, Hazard assisted the team's opening goal scored by Romelu Lukaku.

After featuring as a starter in the team's 1–1 draw with Finland in February 2011, Hazard was relegated back to the substitute's bench for the team's important March 2011 UEFA Euro 2012 qualifying matches as Leekens preferred Nacer Chadli and Mousa Dembélé on the wings. Following the matches, French media began questioning why Hazard was struggling to be appreciated in his home country, while, at the same time, was being praised in France. Marc Wilmots, assistant coach of the national team, responded to the media reports stating "Some people only see Eden's qualities" and "the French press are sometimes blinded by his moments of magic".

In Belgium's next competitive match against Turkey on 3 June 2011, Hazard started the match, but was substituted out after 60 minutes. Disappointed with his performance and substitution, the midfielder retired to the locker room and was later spotted on television outside the stadium with his family eating a hamburger while the match was still ongoing. Following the episode, which has become known as Burgergate in Belgium, Hazard apologised for the defection, while Leekens attributed Hazard's response to the substitution as "a young player making a mistake".

On 4 August, Leekens announced that Hazard would be disciplined for his actions during the Turkey match and, as a result, would miss the team's 10 August friendly against Slovenia, as well as the team's Euro qualifying return match against Azerbaijan on 2 September and friendly against the United States four days later. On 9 August, Hazard's management group issued a press release to the Belgian media. The release detailed Hazard's actions during the Turkey match, criticised the player's three-match suspension, as well as questioned Leekens constant criticism of Hazard. On 25 August, it was announced that Leekens had lifted Hazard's suspension and the midfielder was subsequently named in the team to play the September fixtures. Leekens decided to lift the suspension after having a meeting with Hazard that was organised by the player's agent.

On 7 October 2011, nearly three years after his debut, Hazard scored his first international goal against Kazakhstan in a 4–1 victory. The victory inserted Belgium into second-place position in its group in qualifying for Euro 2012 with the team needing a victory over Germany on 11 October to secure a place in the qualifying play-offs. In the match against Germany, Hazard played the entire match as Belgium failed to earn a place at the tournament, losing 3–1 in Düsseldorf.

=== 2014–2021: Belgium's Golden Generation and assuming the captaincy ===
Hazard made nine appearances in Belgium's successful 2014 FIFA World Cup qualification campaign, scoring twice. The first of these came on 22 March against Macedonia at the Philip II Arena, converting a penalty to conclude a 2–0 win after being fouled by Aleksandar Lazevski. Three days later in the reverse fixture, he beat two defenders before scoring the only goal of the game.

On 13 May 2014, Hazard was named in Belgium's squad for the 2014 World Cup. He assisted Dries Mertens' winning goal in the team's first game of the tournament, a 2–1 win against Algeria in Belo Horizonte. In Belgium's second match, he assisted Divock Origi's 88th-minute goal, giving the team a 1–0 win over Russia and qualifying them for the knockout stage. Belgium reached the quarter-finals, where they were eliminated by Argentina.

On 7 June 2015, due to the suspension of regular skipper Vincent Kompany, Hazard captained Belgium for the first time in a friendly against France at the Stade de France, scoring a penalty for Belgium's final goal in a 4–3 victory. He won another penalty in a Euro 2016 qualifying match on 3 September when fouled by Bosnia and Herzegovina's Ognjen Vranješ, and converted it past his Chelsea clubmate Asmir Begović to conclude Belgium's 3–1 comeback victory. Three days later, he finished Mertens' cross with four minutes remaining, for the only goal in an away win over Cyprus. On 10 October, Hazard scored a spot-kick again after Óscar Sonejee's handball, in a 4–1 win over Andorra which sealed Belgium's qualification to the continental championship for the first time since co-hosting Euro 2000.

Due to the absence of Kompany, Hazard was named captain of Belgium for Euro 2016. He scored a solo goal against Hungary in the last 16, before Belgium were eliminated by Wales in the quarter-finals. Alongside Aaron Ramsey, he finished as the top assist provider of the tournament with four assists.

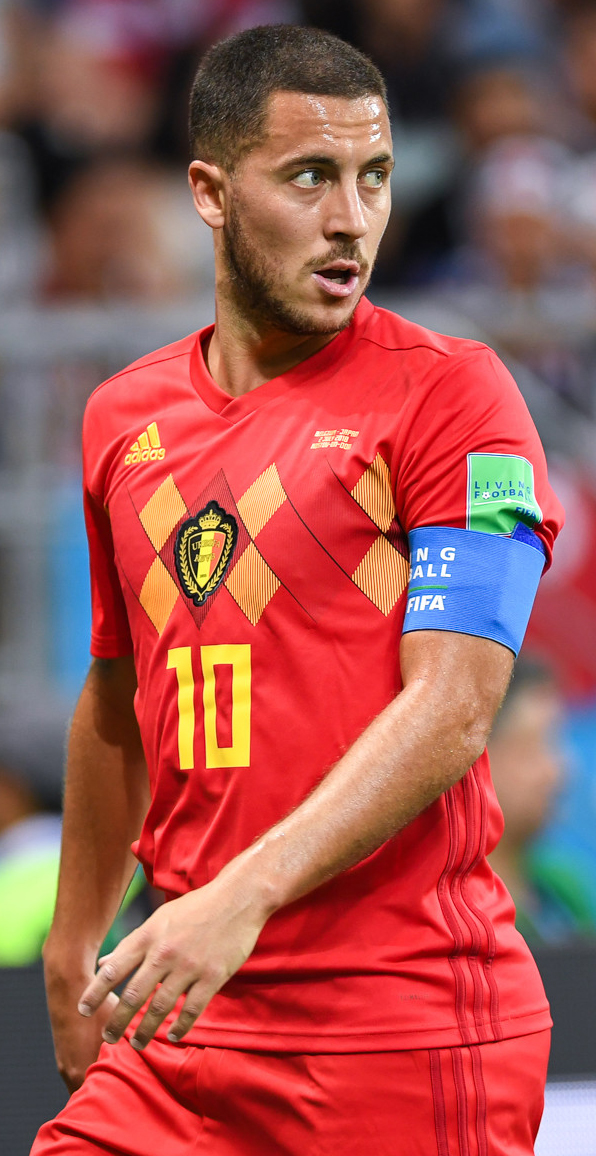
Hazard playing for Belgium at the 2018 FIFA World Cup

Hazard was named in the squad for the 2018 World Cup in Russia, alongside his brother Thorgan, and was selected as captain for the campaign. In the first game against Panama, he assisted the third goal of the match scored by Lukaku as Belgium won 3–0. He then scored twice (which included a penalty) in their second group stage victory against Tunisia. His penalty goal in the 6th minute was the team's second quickest goal in the history of the tournament. Hazard was also selected as man of the match after his impressive performance against Tunisia. In the final group match, Hazard did not play in Belgium's 1–0 victory over England as he, together with eight other starters in the previous two matches, were rested by Roberto Martínez. In Belgium's 3–2 victory over Japan in the last 16, Hazard was instrumental in mounting a comeback from a two-goal deficit as Belgium became the first team in 48 years to come back from 0–2 down to win a World Cup knockout match. For his second consecutive game, Hazard was once again voted man of the match.

Hazard was again in scintillating form in the quarter-finals as he helped lead Belgium to its second World Cup semi-final in their history with a 2–1 victory over five-time champions Brazil. In that game, Hazard set a World Cup record for successful dribbles completed in any World Cup game since 1966, with a 100% success rate in ten dribbles. In the semi-finals, which was a tight game, Belgium were defeated by eventual champions France 1–0 courtesy of Frenchman Samuel Umtiti's header and France's subsequent deep defence. On 14 July, Hazard's third man of the match performance ensured victory for Belgium with his goal in the 82nd minute in a 2–0 victory against England in their third-place play-off, his nation's best ever World Cup finish.

At the end of the 2018 World Cup, the FIFA Technical Study Group (TSG) selected Hazard as the second best player of the tournament, awarding him the Silver Ball. In addition to his dribbling he scored three goals and provided two assists, as well as being selected as man of the match in three matches – more than any other player.

Hazard made his 100th cap for Belgium during the Euro 2020 qualifiers in a 2–0 away win against Cyprus in March 2019, scoring the second goal in that match. Hazard captained Belgium to become the first team to qualify for the tournament. On 17 May 2021, he was selected to the Belgium squad for Euro 2020. Hazard featured in three out of Belgium's five games during the tournament, in which he provided an assist for Kevin De Bruyne to score the winning goal against Denmark. Due to later injury, he could not play in the quarter-final match and witnessed the team being ousted by Italy.

=== 2022: World Cup qualifying and international retirement ===
Hazard was selected for Belgium's 2022 FIFA World Cup qualification campaign, assisting once in a 5–2 win against Estonia, and scoring in a 3–0 victory over the Czech Republic. He was later praised by Belgium manager Roberto Martínez.

On 7 December 2022, following Belgium's group stage elimination at the 2022 World Cup, Hazard announced his retirement from the national team at the age of 31, ending his 14-year international career.

== Player profile ==
=== Style of play ===
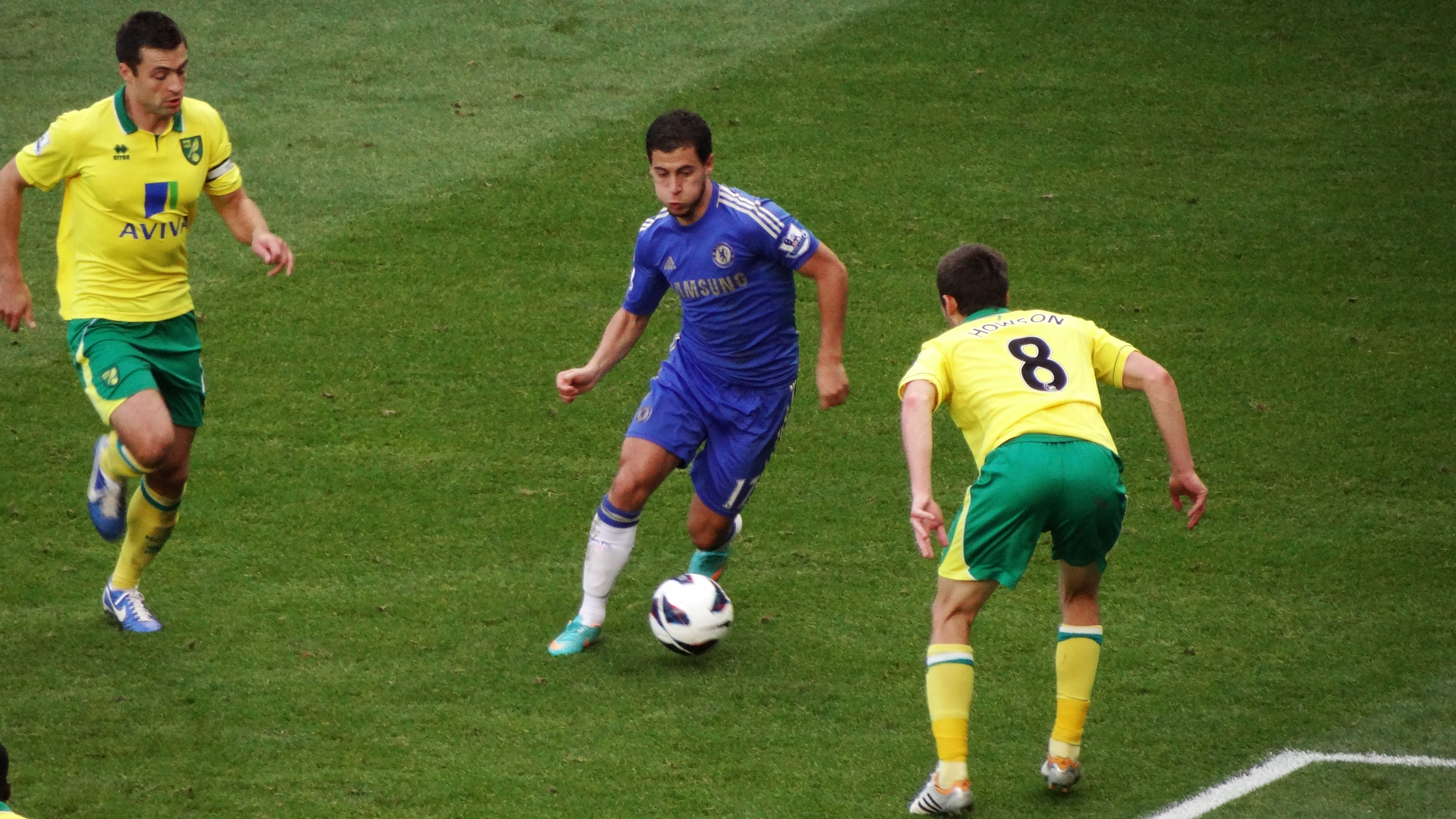
Hazard taking on the Norwich City defence while playing for Chelsea in 2012

Hazard primarily played as either an attacking midfielder or a winger and in 2011 was described as "possibly the outstanding talent in Europe right now". At Lille, under former manager Rudi Garcia, Hazard often played in the latter role in the team's 4–3–3 formation and regularly switched flanks because he could use both feet. Following the departures of fellow playmakers Yohan Cabaye and Gervinho in 2011, during the 2011–12 season, Garcia played Hazard in a creative role as a central attacking midfielder, while also allowing the player to roam back onto the wing if necessary. Two of Hazard's most common exemplary traits were his pace and technical ability, which have been described as "astonishing" and "mesmerizing". His speed, acceleration, and dribbling skills, combined with his creativity, as well as his flair, balance, agility, and low centre of gravity, courtesy of his height (1.73 m/5 feet 8 inches), allowed him to retain possession, take on defenders, and beat opponents in one on one situations.

At Chelsea, Hazard matured into a world class player and was primarily used as a left midfielder, a position which enabled him to cut into the centre and strike on goal with his stronger right foot. His development into one of the world's best players was highlighted in the 2014–15 season; during this season he won multiple awards and received praise from pundits and manager alike. Manager José Mourinho praised Hazard, saying that "He is already a top player and his evolution has been fantastic. He is still very young and he can become the best player in the world." Hazard's former teammate and Lille captain Rio Mavuba described Hazard as "a great player, with an immense talent. He's actually not that big, but he's so fast. He's also very difficult to dispossess and his finishing is top notch." Hazard's frequent goal celebration saw him sliding on his knees; in 2018 he began staying on his feet. Although Hazard's favoured role was as a left winger, he was a versatile attacker, and was also deployed as a second striker, as a lone striker, or even as a false-9 on occasion throughout his career. Beyond his speed, creativity, technical skills, and offensive qualities, he was also an accurate penalty and free kick taker.

=== Reception ===
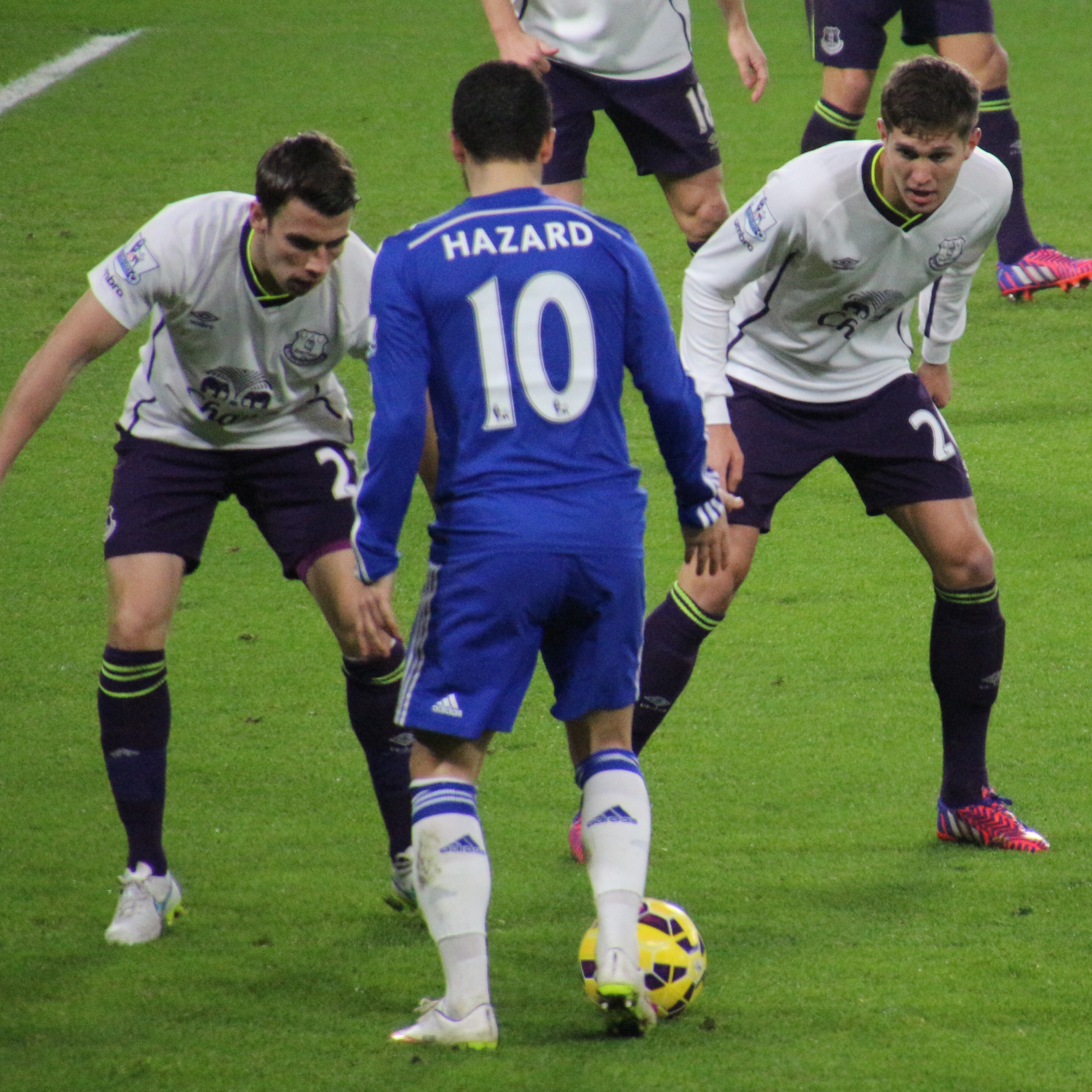
Praising him for his dribbling, creativity and ball retention skills, the FIFA website calls Hazard (pictured here on the ball against Everton's defence) "difficult to dispossess".

Eden Hazard is widely regarded as one of the greatest Belgian players of all time, and was, during his prime, widely considered among the finest and most prolific dribblers. Statistics show that since Opta records began in the 2006–07 season, Hazard ranks second only to Lionel Messi in successful take-ons across Europe's top five leagues, completing 1,220 dribbles with a 57.1 percent success rate. A study by the CIES Football Observatory, which analyzed players using a "dribbling index" combining both the quantity and quality of dribbles per 90 minutes, ranked Hazard ahead of both Neymar and Lionel Messi, citing his 75 percent dribble success rate compared to their 62 percent. During his seven-year spell with Chelsea in the Premier League, Hazard attempted (1,441) and completed (909) more dribbles than any other player in the competition. In the 2014–15 season, he completed 180 successful dribbles, the second-highest total in Premier League history since records began. At the 2018 FIFA World Cup, he completed a tournament-high 40 successful take-ons. Earlier in his career, he was also named Ligue 1's most effective dribbler in both 2011 and 2012.

His pace, coupled with his finishing and ability to retain possession, led to his former coach Claude Puel dubbing him "little Messi", in reference to Lionel Messi. Puel's sentiments were later echoed by former Marseille manager and media personality Rolland Courbis who commented, "At times it looks to me like Lionel Messi on the right-hand side." His vision, described as being the trait he has improved on the most, coupled with his passing, has also allowed him to develop into an effective playmaker and assist provider, which in turn, combined with his finishing ability, enabled him to both score and create goals. His technical ability is highly regarded among his peers. In 2021, Neymar selected Hazard as one of the five most technically gifted players in football. Hazard was the second player he mentioned, following Lionel Messi, in a list that also included Kevin De Bruyne, Marco Verratti, and Thiago Alcântara.

In Belgium, Hazard's talent and similar ascension up the country's football hierarchy has led to comparisons to former Belgian international Enzo Scifo. Both players share the same birthplace and Scifo himself spent time with Hazard while he was in Tubize admitting, "Eden, you know, I've coached in Tubize. During the week, I took care of the young people at least once, and he, in those days, I immediately saw he had a secure future." Former Chelsea player Gianfranco Zola likened Hazard to himself in 2019, a view which the Belgian's former club teammate Frank Lampard had previously expressed in 2013.

However, despite the positive opinions, Hazard has endured criticism from some. In 2010, former Belgium national team manager Georges Leekens questioned Hazard's work-rate. Lille youth academy director Jean-Michel Vandamme countered both managers' criticism by arguing that Hazard simply possesses an intellectual honesty that is out of the ordinary and unexpected of today's footballer declaring, "He is a real competitor, not a cheat, nor a moaner, because you don't hear him complaining when he gets foul."

== Outside football ==
=== Personal life ===
Hazard married Natacha Van Honacker in 2012. They have five sons.

=== Sponsorship ===
In 2012, Hazard signed a sponsorship deal with sportswear and equipment supplier, Nike. He appeared in an advert for the Nike Green Speed II alongside Mario Götze, Theo Walcott, Raheem Sterling, Christian Eriksen and Stephan El Shaarawy in November 2012.

Hazard features on the cover of EA Sports' FIFA video game FIFA 15 in Belgium, the UK, the Netherlands and France, along with Lionel Messi. Hazard, Marco Reus, James Rodríguez and Anthony Martial were announced as the official ambassadors of the game and were the finalists to be the new face of FIFA 17. Hazard was named the new face of the franchise in 2019 – taking over from Cristiano Ronaldo – appearing as the cover star of the regular edition of FIFA 20.

Since March 2016, Hazard has been appearing in adverts for Belgium-based Lotus Bakeries promoting their Biscoff biscuit range. The advert shows him successfully taking a free kick, sending a ball into a gap in 10,000 cups.

=== Club ownership ===
On 26 June 2017, Hazard became a part-owner of expansion North American Soccer League franchise San Diego 1904 FC to begin play in 2018, alongside Demba Ba, Yohan Cabaye and Moussa Sow.

=== Lille tribute ===
On 10 March 2024, Lille OSC chose to rename his Domaine de Luchin training centre main pitch after Hazard. The "Terrain Eden Hazard" (French for "Eden Hazard pitch") was inaugurated by the former Belgium captain in the company of his loved ones, ex-teammates, academy players and supporters groups. The same day, he also ceremoniously kicked off the home match against Rennes and was celebrated by the whole stadium with fans displaying a tifo dedicated to him. Previously, a painted segment of the Berlin Wall with a graffiti of Hazard made by French artist C215 was unveiled in 2016 and is on display inside the centre.

== Career statistics ==
=== Club ===
Appearances and goals by club, season and competition
Club	Season	League			National cup (Note: Includes Coupe de France, FA Cup, Copa del Rey)		League cup (Note: Includes Coupe de la Ligue, Football League Cup/EFL Cup)		Europe		Other		Total	
Club	Season	Division	Apps	Goals	Apps	Goals	Apps	Goals	Apps	Goals	Apps	Goals	Apps	Goals
Lille II	2007–08	CFA	11	1	—		—		—		—		11	1
Lille II	2008–09	CFA	2	0	—		—		—		—		2	0
Lille II	Total		13	1	—		—		—		—		13	1
Lille	2007–08	Ligue 1	4	0	0	0	0	0	—		—		4	0
Lille	2008–09	Ligue 1	30	4	4	2	1	0	—		—		35	6
Lille	2009–10	Ligue 1	37	5	1	0	2	1	12 (Note: Appearances in UEFA Europa League)	4	—		52	10
Lille	2010–11	Ligue 1	38	7	5	3	2	2	9	0	—		54	12
Lille	2011–12	Ligue 1	38	20	3	1	1	0	6 (Note: Appearances in UEFA Champions League)	0	1 (Note: Appearance in Trophée des Champions)	1	49	22
Lille	Total		147	36	13	6	6	3	27	4	1	1	194	50
Chelsea	2012–13	Premier League	34	9	6	1	5	2	13 (Note: Six appearances in UEFA Champions League, seven appearances and one goal in UEFA Europa League)	1	4 (Note: One appearance in FA Community Shield, one appearance in UEFA Super Cup, two appearances in FIFA Club World Cup)	0	62	13
Chelsea	2013–14	Premier League	35	14	3	0	1	0	9	2	1 (Note: Appearance in UEFA Super Cup)	1	49	17
Chelsea	2014–15	Premier League	38	14	1	0	6	2	7	3	—		52	19
Chelsea	2015–16	Premier League	31	4	2	2	1	0	8	0	1 (Note: Appearance in FA Community Shield)	0	43	6
Chelsea	2016–17	Premier League	36	16	4	1	3	0	—		—		43	17
Chelsea	2017–18	Premier League	34	12	5	1	4	1	8	3	0	0	51	17
Chelsea	2018–19	Premier League	37	16	2	0	5	3	8	2	0	0	52	21
Chelsea	Total		245	85	23	5	25	8	53	11	6	1	352	110
Real Madrid	2019–20	La Liga	16	1	0	0	—		6	0	0	0	22	1
Real Madrid	2020–21	La Liga	14	3	1	0	—		5	1	1 (Note: Appearance in Supercopa de España)	0	21	4
Real Madrid	2021–22	La Liga	18	0	2	1	—		3	0	0	0	23	1
Real Madrid	2022–23	La Liga	6	0	1	0	—		3	1	0	0	10	1
Real Madrid	Total		54	4	4	1	—		17	2	1	0	76	7
Career total			459	126	40	12	31	11	97	17	8	2	635	168

=== International ===
Appearances and goals by national team and year
National team	Year	Apps	Goals
Belgium	2008	1	0
Belgium	2009	9	0
Belgium	2010	7	0
Belgium	2011	8	1
Belgium	2012	8	1
Belgium	2013	9	3
Belgium	2014	12	1
Belgium	2015	9	6
Belgium	2016	14	5
Belgium	2017	5	4
Belgium	2018	16	6
Belgium	2019	8	5
Belgium	2020	0	0
Belgium	2021	10	1
Belgium	2022	10	0
Total		126	33

Belgium score listed first, score column indicates score after each Hazard goal

List of international goals scored by Eden Hazard
No.	Date	Venue	Cap	Opponent	Score	Result	Competition	Ref.
1	7 October 2011	King Baudouin Stadium, Brussels, Belgium	23	Kazakhstan	2–0	4–1	UEFA Euro 2012 qualifying	
2	25 May 2012	King Baudouin Stadium, Brussels, Belgium	27	Montenegro	2–1	2–2	Friendly	
3	6 February 2013	Jan Breydel Stadium, Bruges, Belgium	34	Slovakia	1–0	2–1	Friendly	
4	22 March 2013	Philip II National Arena, Skopje, Macedonia	35	Macedonia	2–0	2–0	2014 FIFA World Cup qualification	
5	26 March 2013	King Baudouin Stadium, Brussels, Belgium	36	Macedonia	1–0	1–0	2014 FIFA World Cup qualification	
6	1 June 2014	Friends Arena, Solna, Sweden	45	Sweden	2–0	2–0	Friendly	
7	28 March 2015	King Baudouin Stadium, Brussels, Belgium	55	Cyprus	4–0	5–0	UEFA Euro 2016 qualifying	
8	7 June 2015	Stade de France, Saint-Denis, France	57	France	4–1	4–3	Friendly	
9	3 September 2015	King Baudouin Stadium, Brussels, Belgium	59	Bosnia and Herzegovina	3–1	3–1	UEFA Euro 2016 qualifying	
10	6 September 2015	GSP Stadium, Nicosia, Cyprus	60	Cyprus	1–0	1–0	UEFA Euro 2016 qualifying	
11	10 October 2015	Estadi Nacional, Andorra la Vella, Andorra	61	Andorra	3–1	4–1	UEFA Euro 2016 qualifying	
12	13 October 2015	King Baudouin Stadium, Brussels, Belgium	62	Israel	3–0	3–1	UEFA Euro 2016 qualifying	
13	5 June 2016	King Baudouin Stadium, Brussels, Belgium	66	Norway	2–2	3–2	Friendly	
14	26 June 2016	Stadium de Toulouse, Toulouse, France	70	Hungary	3–0	4–0	UEFA Euro 2016	
15	7 October 2016	King Baudouin Stadium, Brussels, Belgium	74	Bosnia and Herzegovina	2–0	4–0	2018 FIFA World Cup qualification	
16	10 October 2016	Estádio Algarve, Faro/Loulé, Portugal	75	Gibraltar	6–0	6–0	2018 FIFA World Cup qualification	
17	13 November 2016	King Baudouin Stadium, Brussels, Belgium	77	Estonia	3–0	8–1	2018 FIFA World Cup qualification	
18	31 August 2017	Stade Maurice Dufrasne, Liège, Belgium	78	Gibraltar	6–0	9–0	2018 FIFA World Cup qualification	
19	10 October 2017	King Baudouin Stadium, Brussels, Belgium	81	Cyprus	1–0	4–0	2018 FIFA World Cup qualification	
20	10 October 2017	King Baudouin Stadium, Brussels, Belgium	81	Cyprus	3–0	4–0	2018 FIFA World Cup qualification	
21	10 November 2017	King Baudouin Stadium, Brussels, Belgium	82	Mexico	1–0	3–3	Friendly	
22	6 June 2018	King Baudouin Stadium, Brussels, Belgium	85	Egypt	2–0	3–0	Friendly	
23	23 June 2018	Otkritie Arena, Moscow, Russia	88	Tunisia	1–0	5–2	2018 FIFA World Cup	
24	23 June 2018	Otkritie Arena, Moscow, Russia	88	Tunisia	4–1	5–2	2018 FIFA World Cup	
25	14 July 2018	Krestovsky Stadium, Saint Petersburg, Russia	92	England	2–0	2–0	2018 FIFA World Cup	
26	7 September 2018	Hampden Park, Glasgow, Scotland	93	Scotland	2–0	4–0	Friendly	
27	11 September 2018	Laugardalsvöllur, Reykjavík, Iceland	94	Iceland	1–0	3–0	2018–19 UEFA Nations League A	
28	21 March 2019	King Baudouin Stadium, Brussels, Belgium	99	Russia	2–1	3–1	UEFA Euro 2020 qualifying	
29	21 March 2019	King Baudouin Stadium, Brussels, Belgium	99	Russia	3–1	3–1	UEFA Euro 2020 qualifying	
30	24 March 2019	GSP Stadium, Nicosia, Cyprus	100	Cyprus	1–0	2–0	UEFA Euro 2020 qualifying	
31	16 November 2019	Krestovsky Stadium, Saint Petersburg, Russia	105	Russia	2–0	4–1	UEFA Euro 2020 qualifying	
32	16 November 2019	Krestovsky Stadium, Saint Petersburg, Russia	105	Russia	3–0	4–1	UEFA Euro 2020 qualifying	
33	5 September 2021	King Baudouin Stadium, Brussels, Belgium	113	Czech Republic	2–0	3–0	2022 FIFA World Cup qualification	

== Honours ==
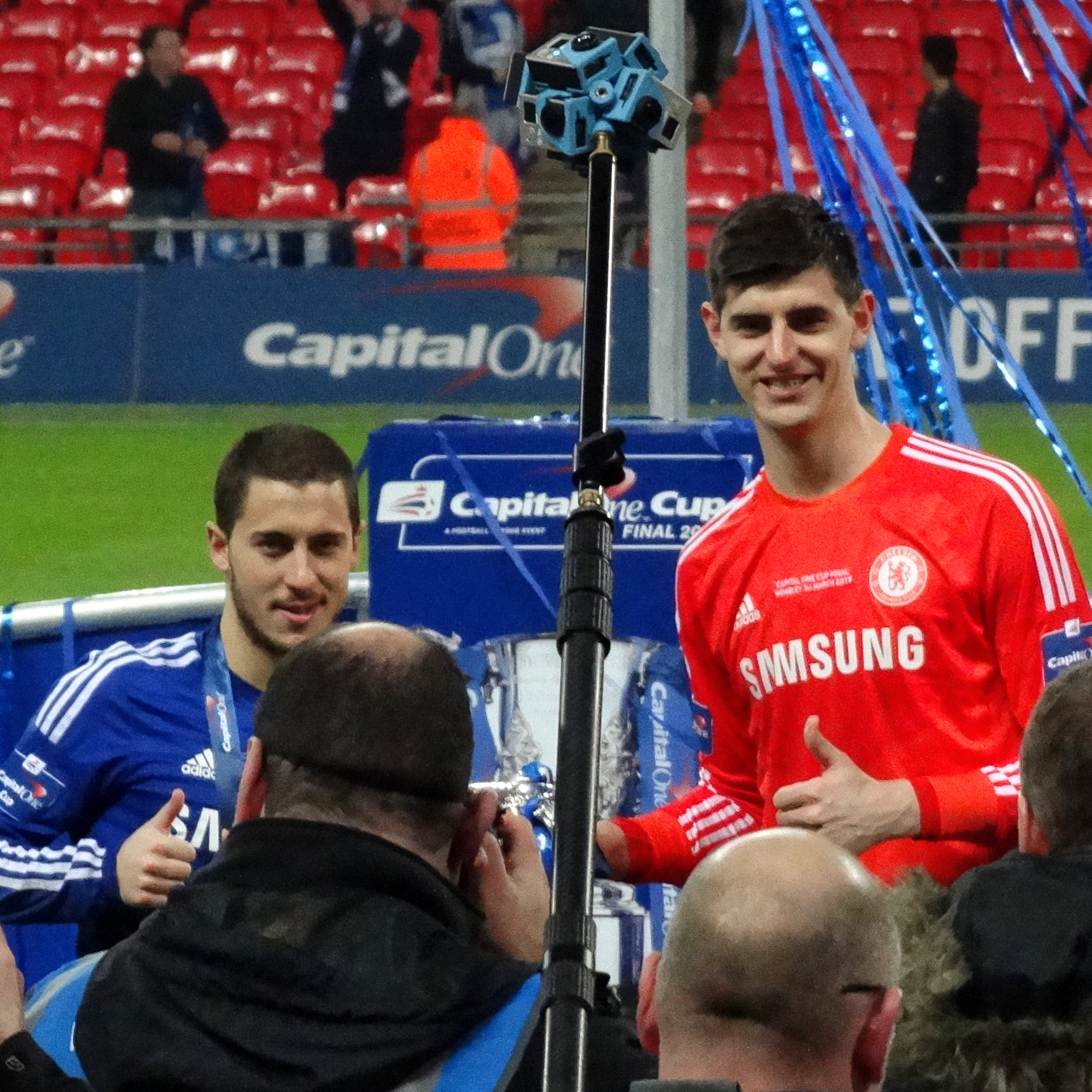
Hazard (left) holding the trophy after Chelsea's victory in the 2015 Football League Cup final

Lille

- Ligue 1: 2010–11
- Coupe de France: 2010–11

Chelsea

- Premier League: 2014–15, 2016–17
- FA Cup: 2017–18; runner-up: 2016–17
- Football League Cup/EFL Cup: 2014–15; runner-up: 2018–19
- UEFA Europa League: 2012–13, 2018–19
- FIFA Club World Cup runner-up: 2012

Real Madrid

- La Liga: 2019–20, 2021–22
- Copa del Rey: 2022–23
- Supercopa de España: 2022
- UEFA Champions League: 2021–22
- UEFA Super Cup: 2022

Belgium

- FIFA World Cup third place: 2018

Individual

- Ligue 1 Young Player of the Year: 2008–09, 2009–10
- Ligue 1 Team of the Year: 2009–10, 2010–11, 2011–12
- UNFP Player of the Month: March 2010, March 2011, March 2012, April 2012
- Ligue 1 Player of the Year: 2010–11, 2011–12
- Ligue 1 Goal of the Season: 2010–11
- Ligue 1 top assist provider: 2011–12
- Bravo Award: 2011
- France Football Golden Star: 2010–11, 2011–12
- PFA Premier League Team of the Year: 2012–13, 2013–14, 2014–15, 2016–17
- PFA Young Player of the Year: 2013–14
- Chelsea Player of the Year: 2013–14, 2014–15, 2016–17, 2018–19
- Premier League Player of the Season: 2014–15
- UEFA European Championship top assist provider: 2016
- Chelsea Players' Player of the Year: 2014–15, 2018–19
- ESM Team of the Season: 2014–15, 2018–19
- PFA Players' Player of the Year 2014–15
- FWA Footballer of the Year: 2014–15
- Chelsea Goal of the Year: 2015–16, 2016–17, 2018–19
- Premier League Player of the Month: October 2016, September 2018
- PFA Fans' Premier League Player of the Month: October 2016
- Premier League Goal of the Month: February 2017, April 2019
- UEFA Team of the Year: 2017, 2018
- Belgium Player of the Year: 2017, 2018, 2019
- Best Belgian Abroad: 2017, 2018, 2019
- FIFA World Cup Silver Ball: 2018
- FIFA World Cup Fantasy Team: 2018
- FIFA FIFPRO Men's World 11: 2018, 2019
- IFFHS Men's World Team: 2018
- Belgian Sportsman of the Year: 2018
- UEFA Europa League Player of the Season: 2018–19
- UEFA Europa League Squad of the Season: 2018–19
- Premier League Playmaker of the Season: 2018–19
- PFA Fans' Player of the Year: 2018–19
- Sports Illustrated Premier League Team of the Decade: 2010–2019
- Lille OSC Goal of the Century
- Chelsea F.C. All Time XI
- Premier League Hall of Fame: 2025

== See also ==
- List of men's footballers with 100 or more international caps
- List of European association football families
