= Jean-Michel Vandamme =

French association football executive (born 1959)

Personal information
- Date of birth: 10 November 1959 (age 66)
- Place of birth: Sedan, France
- Height: 1.75 m (5 ft 9 in)
- Position: Midfielder

Team information
- Current team: Lille (Academy general manager)

Senior career*
Years	Team	Apps	(Gls)
1974–1984	Lille		

Managerial career
- 1984–1989: Lille (assistant)
- 1989–1992: Lens (assistant)
- * Club domestic league appearances and goals

Jean-Michel Vandamme (French pronunciation: [ʒɑ̃ miʃɛl vɑ̃dam]; born 10 November 1959) is a French football executive, and former professional player and coach, who is currently the academy general manager of French Ligue 1 club Lille.

== Career ==
After retiring from professional football, Jean-Michel Vandamme became Lille first-team assistant coach in 1984. In 1989, he then left the club for Derby du Nord rivals Lens and joined the first-team coaching staff as assistant coach.

In 1993, after this short experience, he returned to Lille and was appointed as academy general manager of the Northmen. He was then appointed as technical advisor of president Michel Seydoux in 2009, and as head of recruitment in 2011.

Vandamme left his longtime club in 2018 with Luis Campos' arrival as Lille new technical advisor under Gérard Lopez presidency. As a consequence, he signed with Saint-Étienne, being appointed as head of recruitment in 2019, and worked for Club Brugge as well.

On 20 April 2021, he returned to Lille and was appointed again as academy general manager.

During his tenure as academy general manager, Lille's youth programme produced players such as Eden Hazard, Yohan Cabaye, Mathieu Debuchy, Idrissa Gueye, Lucas Digne, Divock Origi, Benjamin Pavard or Martin Terrier.

== Honours ==
=== Player ===
Lille

- Division 2: 1977–78
