= Trophées UNFP du football =

Series of football awards

The Trophées UNFP du football are a number of awards given annually by the Union Nationale des Footballeurs Professionnels (UNFP) to players playing in France's Ligue 1, Ligue 2, and Division 1 Féminine, as well as to managers and referees. The most prestigious award is the Ligue 1 Player of the Year. Created in 1988 under the name Oscars du football, they were renamed in 2004 after a complaint by the Academy Awards committee. The ceremony has been broadcast live on Canal+ since 1994.

== Ligue 1 ==
=== Player of the Year ===
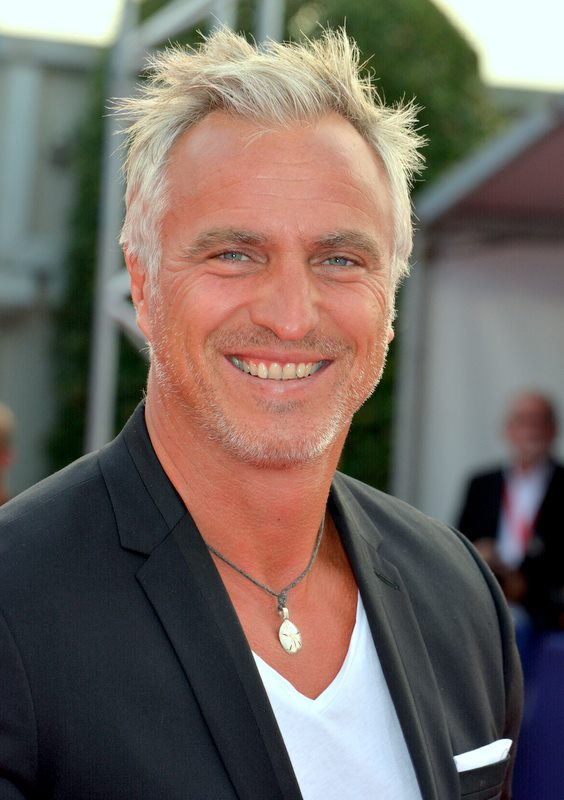
David Ginola was the first recipient of the Player of the Year award.

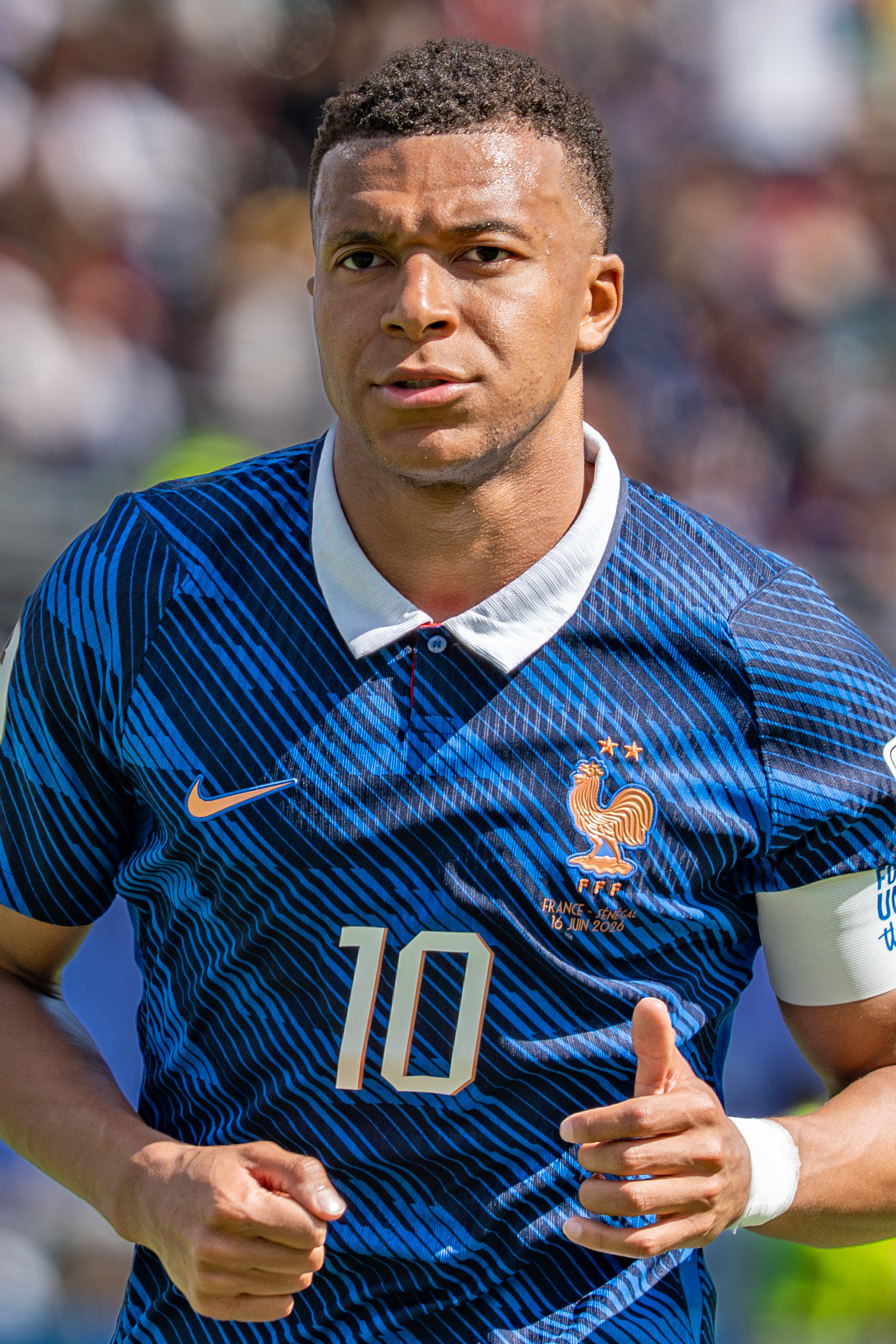
Kylian Mbappé won the Player of the Year award a record five times, all consecutively.

Year	Nat.	Player	Club
1994	(France)	David Ginola	Paris Saint-Germain
1995	(France)	Vincent Guérin	Paris Saint-Germain
1996	(France)	Zinedine Zidane	Bordeaux
1997	(Brazil)	Sonny Anderson	Monaco
1998	(Italy)	Marco Simone	Paris Saint-Germain
1999	(Algeria)	Ali Benarbia	Bordeaux
2000	(Argentina)	Marcelo Gallardo	Monaco
2001	(France)	Eric Carrière	Nantes
2002	(Portugal)	Pauleta	Bordeaux
2003	(Portugal)	Pauleta	Bordeaux
2004	(Ivory Coast)	Didier Drogba	Marseille
2005	(Ghana)	Michael Essien	Lyon
2006	(Brazil)	Juninho	Lyon
2007	(France)	Florent Malouda	Lyon
2008	(France)	Karim Benzema	Lyon
2009	(France)	Yoann Gourcuff	Bordeaux
2010	(Argentina)	Lisandro López	Lyon
2011	(Belgium)	Eden Hazard	Lille
2012	(Belgium)	Eden Hazard	Lille
2013	(Sweden)	Zlatan Ibrahimović	Paris Saint-Germain
2014	(Sweden)	Zlatan Ibrahimović	Paris Saint-Germain
2015	(France)	Alexandre Lacazette	Lyon
2016	(Sweden)	Zlatan Ibrahimović	Paris Saint-Germain
2017	(Uruguay)	Edinson Cavani	Paris Saint-Germain
2018	(Brazil)	Neymar	Paris Saint-Germain
2019	(France)	Kylian Mbappé	Paris Saint-Germain
2020	Not awarded		
2021	(France)	Kylian Mbappé	Paris Saint-Germain
2022	(France)	Kylian Mbappé	Paris Saint-Germain
2023	(France)	Kylian Mbappé	Paris Saint-Germain
2024	(France)	Kylian Mbappé	Paris Saint-Germain
2025	(France)	Ousmane Dembélé	Paris Saint-Germain
2026	(France)	Ousmane Dembélé	Paris Saint-Germain

=== Young Player of the Year ===
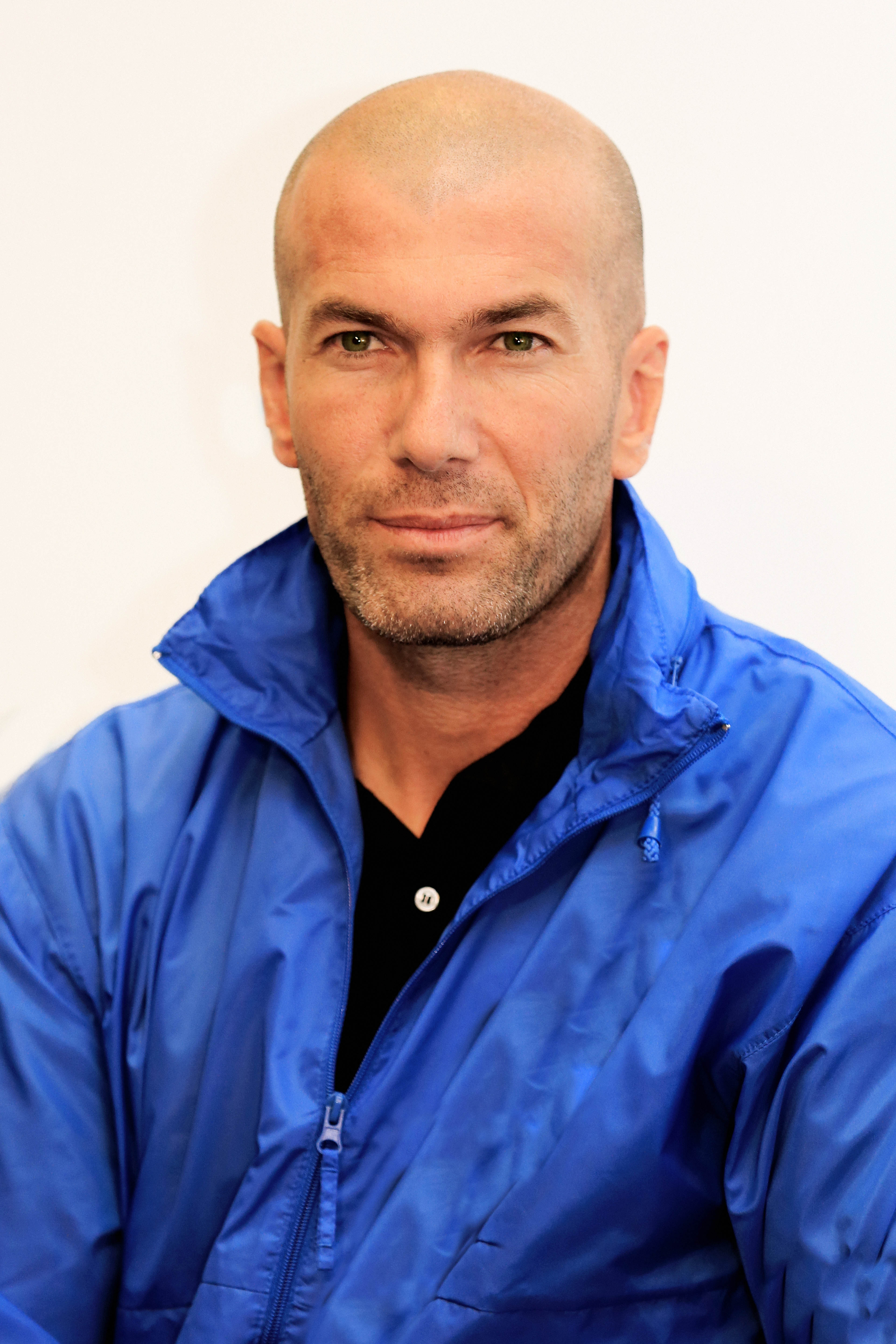
Zinedine Zidane was named Young Player of the Year in 1994 and Player of the Year two years later.

Year	Nat.	Player	Club
1994	(France)	Zinedine Zidane	Bordeaux
1995	(France)	Florian Maurice	Lyon
1996	(France)	Robert Pires	Metz
1997	(France)	Thierry Henry	Monaco
1998	(France)	David Trezeguet	Monaco
1999	(France)	Olivier Monterrubio	Nantes
2000	(France)	Philippe Christanval	Monaco
2001	(France)	Sidney Govou	Lyon
2002	(France)	Djibril Cissé	Auxerre
2003	(France)	Lionel Mathis	Auxerre
2004	(France)	Patrice Evra	Monaco
2005	(France)	Jérémy Toulalan	Nantes
2006	(France)	Franck Ribéry	Marseille
2007	(France)	Samir Nasri	Marseille
2008	(France)	Hatem Ben Arfa	Lyon
2009	(Belgium)	Eden Hazard	Lille
2010	(Belgium)	Eden Hazard	Lille
2011	(France)	Mamadou Sakho	Paris Saint-Germain
2012	(Morocco)	Younès Belhanda	Montpellier
2013	(France)	Florian Thauvin	Bastia
2014	(Italy)	Marco Verratti	Paris Saint-Germain
2015	(France)	Nabil Fekir	Lyon
2016	(France)	Ousmane Dembélé	Rennes
2017	(France)	Kylian Mbappé	Monaco
2018	(France)	Kylian Mbappé	Paris Saint-Germain
2019	(France)	Kylian Mbappé	Paris Saint-Germain
2020	Not awarded		
2021	(France)	Aurélien Tchouaméni	Monaco
2022	(France)	William Saliba	Marseille
2023	(Portugal)	Nuno Mendes	Paris Saint-Germain
2024	(France)	Warren Zaïre-Emery	Paris Saint-Germain
2025	(France)	Désiré Doué	Paris Saint-Germain
2026	(France)	Désiré Doué	Paris Saint-Germain

=== Goalkeeper of the Year ===
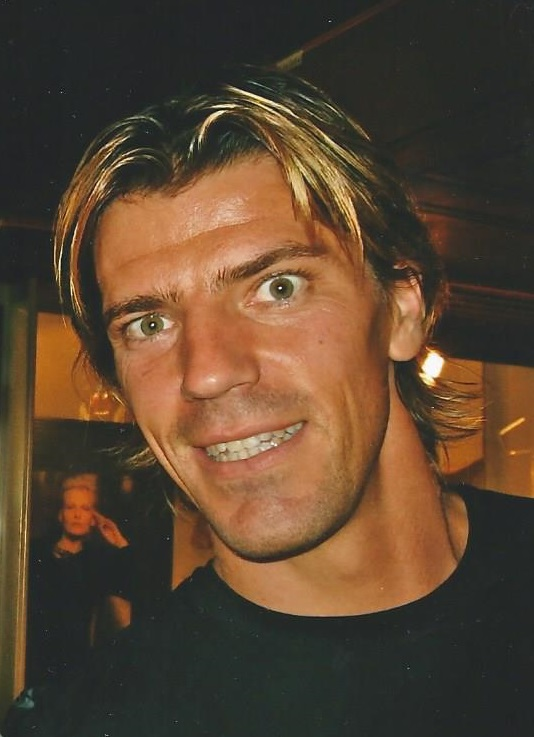
Grégory Coupet won the award four times in a row between 2003 and 2006.

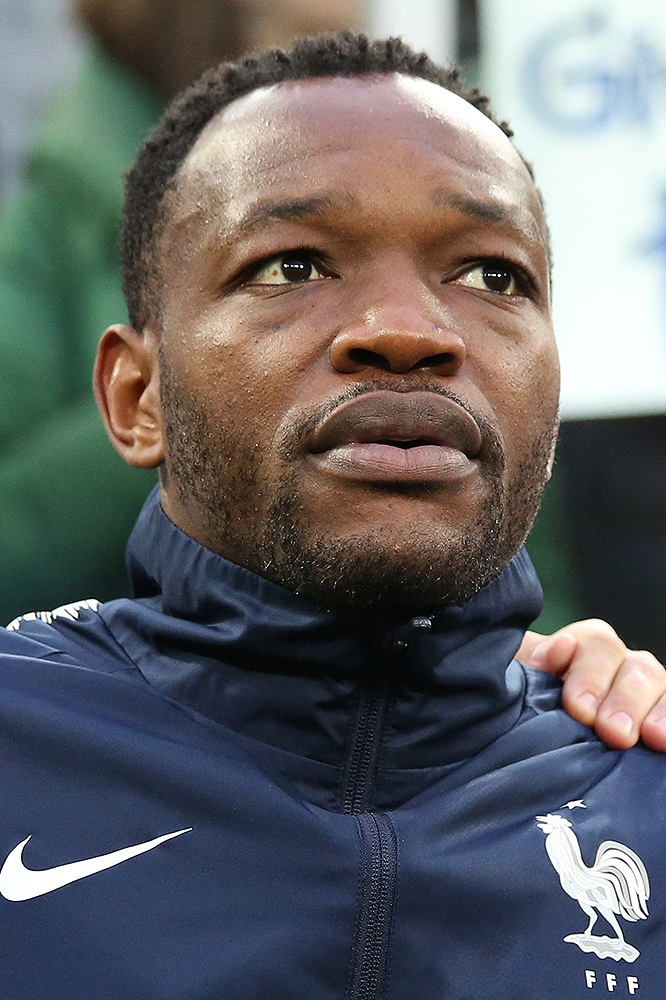
Steve Mandanda won the Goalkeeper of the Year award a record five times.

Year	Nat.	Player	Club
2002	(France)	Ulrich Ramé	Bordeaux
2003	(France)	Grégory Coupet	Lyon
2004	(France)	Grégory Coupet	Lyon
2005	(France)	Grégory Coupet	Lyon
2006	(France)	Grégory Coupet	Lyon
2007	(France)	Teddy Richert	Sochaux
2008	(France)	Steve Mandanda	Marseille
2009	(France)	Hugo Lloris	Lyon
2010	(France)	Hugo Lloris	Lyon
2011	(France)	Steve Mandanda	Marseille
2012	(France)	Hugo Lloris	Lyon
2013	(Italy)	Salvatore Sirigu	Paris Saint-Germain
2014	(Italy)	Salvatore Sirigu	Paris Saint-Germain
2015	(France)	Steve Mandanda	Marseille
2016	(France)	Steve Mandanda	Marseille
2017	(Croatia)	Danijel Subašić	Monaco
2018	(France)	Steve Mandanda	Marseille
2019	(France)	Mike Maignan	Lille
2020	Not awarded		
2021	(Costa Rica)	Keylor Navas	Paris Saint-Germain
2022	(Italy)	Gianluigi Donnarumma	Paris Saint-Germain
2023	(France)	Brice Samba	Lens
2024	(Italy)	Gianluigi Donnarumma	Paris Saint-Germain
2025	(France)	Lucas Chevalier	Lille
2026	(France)	Robin Risser	Lens

=== Manager of the Year ===
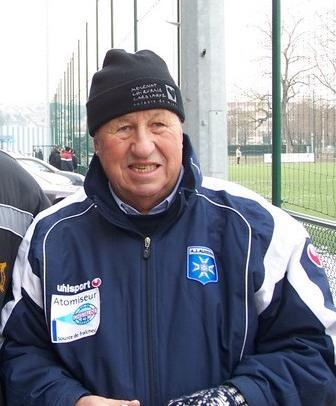
Guy Roux was named Manager of the Year after leading Auxerre to their first double in 1996.

Year	Nat.	Manager	Club
1994	(France)	Luis Fernández	Cannes
1995	(France)	Francis Smerecki	Guingamp
1996	(France)	Guy Roux	Auxerre
1997	(France)	Jean Tigana	Monaco
1998	(France)	Daniel Leclercq	Lens
1999	(France)	Élie Baup	Bordeaux
2000	(France)	Claude Puel	Monaco
2001	(France)	Raynald Denoueix	Nantes
2002	(France)	Joël Müller	Lens
2003	(France)	Guy Lacombe	Sochaux
2004	(France)	Didier Deschamps	Monaco
2005	(France)	Paul Le Guen	Lyon
2006	(France)	Claude Puel	Lille
2007	(France)	Gérard Houllier	Lyon
2008	(France)	Laurent Blanc	Bordeaux
2009	(Belgium)	Eric Gerets	Marseille
2010	(France)	Jean Fernandez	Auxerre
2011	(France)	Rudi Garcia	Lille
2012	(France)	René Girard	Montpellier
2013	(Italy) (France)	Carlo Ancelotti; Christophe Galtier	Paris Saint-Germain; Saint-Étienne
2014	(France)	René Girard	Lille
2015	(France)	Laurent Blanc	Paris Saint-Germain
2016	(France)	Laurent Blanc	Paris Saint-Germain
2017	(Portugal)	Leonardo Jardim	Monaco
2018	(Spain)	Unai Emery	Paris Saint-Germain
2019	(France)	Christophe Galtier	Lille
2020	Not awarded		
2021	(France)	Christophe Galtier	Lille
2022	(France)	Bruno Génésio	Rennes
2023	(France)	Franck Haise	Lens
2024	(France)	Éric Roy	Brest
2025	(Spain)	Luis Enrique	Paris Saint-Germain
2026	(France)	Pierre Sage	Lens

=== Goal of the Year ===
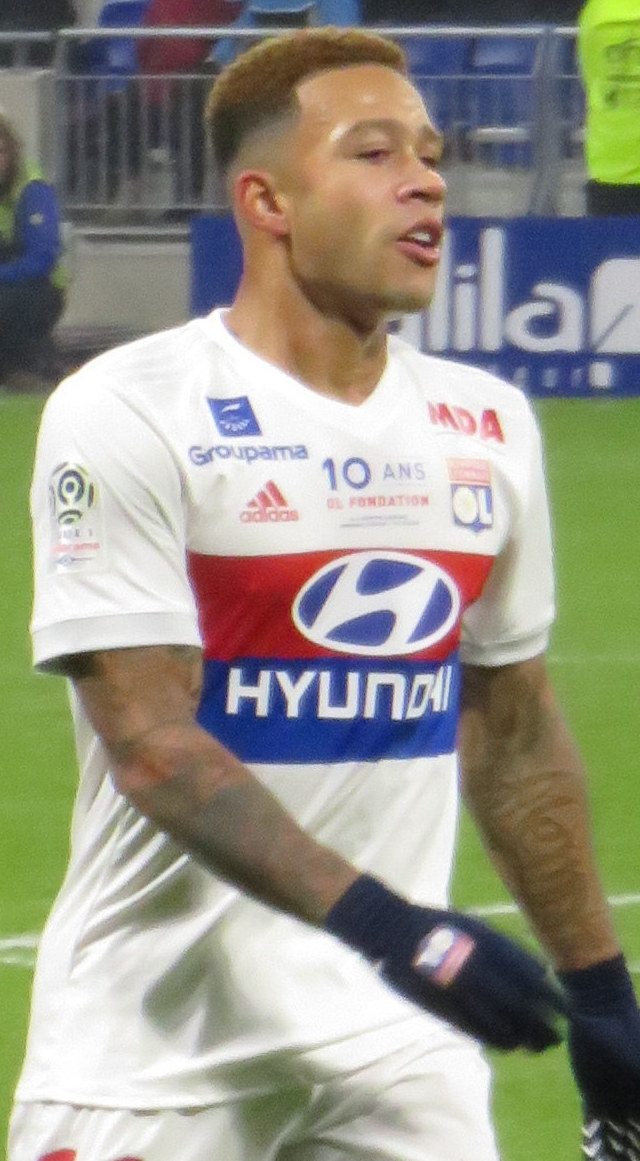
Dutch Memphis Depay scored the best goal of the 2016–17 season with Lyon.

Unlike the other awards, the best goal of the year is chosen by the public.

Year	Nat.	Player	Club	Goal scored
2002	(France)	Antoine Sibierski	Lens	On 18 December 2001 against Nantes (3–0)
2003	(Brazil)	Ronaldinho	Paris Saint-Germain	On 22 February 2003 against Guingamp (3–2)
2004	(Ivory Coast)	Didier Drogba	Marseille	On 4 February 2004 against Montpellier (1–0)
2005	(France)	Laurent Batlles	Marseille	On 29 January 2005 against Toulouse (3–1)
2006	(France)	Franck Ribéry	Marseille	On 19 November 2005 against Nantes (2–1)
2007	(Brazil)	Ilan	Saint-Étienne	On 24 February 2007 against Paris Saint-Germain (2–0)
2008	(France)	Mathieu Valbuena	Marseille	On 26 January 2008 against Caen (6–1)
2009	(France)	Yoann Gourcuff	Bordeaux	On 11 January 2009 against Paris Saint-Germain (4–0)
2010	(Senegal)	Mamadou Niang	Marseille	On 19 September 2009 against Montpellier (4–2)
2011	N/A			
2012	(Morocco)	Younès Belhanda	Montpellier	On 11 April 2012 against Marseille (1–3)
2013	(Tunisia)	Saber Khelifa	Evian	On 12 May 2013 against Nice (4–0)
2014	(Sweden)	Zlatan Ibrahimović	Paris Saint-Germain	On 19 October 2013 against Bastia (4–0)
2015	(France)	Julian Palmieri	Bastia	On 10 January 2015 against Paris Saint-Germain (4–2)
2016	(France)	Pierrick Capelle	Angers	On 27 February 2016 against Guingamp (2–2)
2017	(Netherlands)	Memphis Depay	Lyon	On 12 March 2017 against Toulouse (4–0)
2018	(Brazil)	Malcom	Bordeaux	On 1 December 2017 against Dijon (2–3)
2019	(France)	Loïc Rémy	Lille	On 12 May 2019 against Bordeaux (1–0)
2020	Not awarded			
2021	(Turkey)	Burak Yılmaz	Lille	On 7 May 2021 against Lens (3–0)
2022	(Senegal)	Bamba Dieng	Marseille	On 12 December 2021 against Strasbourg (1–0)
2023	(France)	Elye Wahi	Montpellier	On 22 October 2022 against Lyon (1–1)
2024	(Mali)	Kamory Doumbia	Brest	On 20 December 2023 against Lorient (4–0)
2025	(Algeria)	Amine Gouiri	Marseille	On 27 April 2025 against Brest (4–1)
2026	(France)	Ousmane Dembélé	Paris Saint-Germain	On 16 January 2026 against Lille (2–0)

=== Best French Player Playing Abroad ===
Year	Player	Club
2016	Antoine Griezmann	(Spain) Atlético Madrid
2017	N'Golo Kanté	(England) Chelsea
2018	N'Golo Kanté	(England) Chelsea
2019	Karim Benzema	(Spain) Real Madrid
2021	Karim Benzema	(Spain) Real Madrid
2022	Karim Benzema	(Spain) Real Madrid
2023	Karim Benzema	(Spain) Real Madrid
2024	Antoine Griezmann	(Spain) Atlético Madrid
2025	Kylian Mbappé	(Spain) Real Madrid
2026	Michael Olise	(Germany) Bayern Munich

=== Team of the Year ===
Highlighted players had at least one prior appearance in Ligue 1's team of the year since 2003.

==== 2002–03 ====
Position	Nat.	Player	Club
GK	(France)	Grégory Coupet	Lyon
RB	(France)	Johan Radet	Auxerre
CB	(Belgium)	Daniel Van Buyten	Marseille
CB	(France)	Philippe Mexès	Auxerre
LB	(France)	Manuel dos Santos	Marseille
DM	(Ghana)	Michael Essien	Bastia
RM	(France)	Benoît Pedretti	Sochaux
LM	(France)	Jérôme Rothen	Monaco
AM	(France)	Ludovic Giuly	Monaco
CF	(Democratic Republic of the Congo)	Shabani Nonda	Monaco
CF	(Portugal)	Pauleta	Bordeaux

==== 2003–04 ====
Position	Nat.	Player	Club
GK	(France)	Grégory Coupet	Lyon
RB	(France)	Bernard Mendy	Paris Saint-Germain
CB	(Colombia)	Mario Yepes	Nantes
CB	(France)	Sébastien Squillaci	Monaco
LB	(France)	Patrice Evra	Monaco
DM	(Argentina)	Lucas Bernardi	Monaco
RM	(France)	Ludovic Giuly	Monaco
LM	(France)	Benoît Pedretti	Sochaux
AM	(Brazil)	Juninho	Lyon
FW	(Ivory Coast)	Didier Drogba	Marseille
FW	(Spain)	Fernando Morientes	Monaco

==== 2004–05 ====
Position	Nat.	Player	Club
GK	(France)	Grégory Coupet	Lyon
RB	(Senegal)	Habib Beye	Marseille
CB	(Brazil)	Cris	Lyon
CB	(France)	Gaël Givet	Monaco
LB	(France)	Eric Abidal	Lyon
DM	(Ghana)	Michael Essien	Lyon
RM	(Ivory Coast)	Bonaventure Kalou	Auxerre
LM	(France)	Florent Malouda	Lyon
AM	(Brazil)	Juninho	Lyon
FW	(France)	Sylvain Wiltord	Lyon
FW	(Switzerland)	Alexander Frei	Rennes

==== 2005–06 ====
Position	Nat.	Player	Club
GK	(France)	Grégory Coupet	Lyon
RB	(Tunisia)	David Jemmali	Bordeaux
CB	(Brazil)	Cris	Lyon
CB	(Colombia)	Mario Yepes	Paris Saint-Germain
LB	(France)	Eric Abidal	Lyon
DM	(Mali)	Mahamadou Diarra	Lyon
RM	(France)	Franck Ribéry	Marseille
LM	(France)	Florent Malouda	Lyon
AM	(Brazil)	Juninho	Lyon
FW	(France)	Sylvain Wiltord	Lyon
FW	(Portugal)	Pauleta	Paris Saint-Germain

==== 2006–07 ====
Position	Nat.	Player	Club
GK	(France)	Teddy Richert	Sochaux
RB	(France)	Bacary Sagna	Auxerre
CB	(Brazil)	Cris	Lyon
CB	(Brazil)	Hilton	Lens
LB	(France)	Eric Abidal	Lyon
DM	(Mali)	Seydou Keita	Lens
RM	(Ivory Coast)	Kader Keïta	Lille
LM	(France)	Florent Malouda	Lyon
AM	(France)	Samir Nasri	Marseille
FW	(France)	Steve Savidan	Valenciennes
FW	(Sweden)	Johan Elmander	Toulouse

==== 2007–08 ====
Position	Nat.	Player	Club
GK	(France)	Steve Mandanda	Marseille
RB	(France)	Laurent Bonnart	Marseille
CB	(France)	Sébastien Puygrenier	Nancy
CB	(Brazil)	Hilton	Lens
LB	(Nigeria)	Taye Taiwo	Marseille
DM	(France)	Jérémy Toulalan	Lyon
DM	(France)	Benoît Cheyrou	Marseille
RM	(France)	Mathieu Valbuena	Marseille
LM	(Brazil)	Wendel	Bordeaux
FW	(Senegal)	Mamadou Niang	Marseille
FW	(France)	Karim Benzema	Lyon

==== 2008–09 ====
Position	Nat.	Player	Club
GK	(France)	Hugo Lloris	Lyon
RB	(France)	Rod Fanni	Rennes
CB	(Senegal)	Souleymane Diawara	Bordeaux
CB	(Brazil)	Hilton	Marseille
LB	(Nigeria)	Taye Taiwo	Marseille
DM	(France)	Benoît Cheyrou	Marseille
RM	(Benin)	Stéphane Sessègnon	Paris Saint-Germain
LM	(Brazil)	Michel Bastos	Lille
AM	(France)	Yoann Gourcuff	Bordeaux
FW	(France)	Guillaume Hoarau	Paris Saint-Germain
FW	(France)	André-Pierre Gignac	Toulouse

==== 2009–10 ====
Position	Nat.	Player	Club
GK	(France)	Hugo Lloris	Lyon
RB	(France)	Rod Fanni	Rennes
CB	(Senegal)	Souleymane Diawara	Marseille
CB	(France)	Michaël Ciani	Bordeaux
LB	(France)	Benoît Trémoulinas	Bordeaux
DM	(France)	Benoît Cheyrou	Marseille
AM	(France)	Yoann Gourcuff	Bordeaux
AM	(Belgium)	Eden Hazard	Lille
FW	(Argentina)	Lisandro López	Lyon
FW	(Senegal)	Mamadou Niang	Marseille
FW	(Morocco)	Marouane Chamakh	Bordeaux

==== 2010–11 ====
Position	Nat.	Player	Club
GK	(France)	Steve Mandanda	Marseille
RB	(France)	Anthony Réveillère	Lyon
CB	(France)	Adil Rami	Lille
CB	(France)	Mamadou Sakho	Paris Saint-Germain
LB	(Nigeria)	Taye Taiwo	Marseille
DM	(France)	Yann M'Vila	Rennes
RM	(Ivory Coast)	Gervinho	Lille
AM	(Belgium)	Eden Hazard	Lille
LM	(Brazil)	Nenê	Paris Saint-Germain
FW	(France)	Kévin Gameiro	Lorient
FW	(Senegal)	Moussa Sow	Lille

==== 2011–12 ====
Position	Nat.	Player	Club
GK	(France)	Hugo Lloris	Lyon
RB	(France)	Mathieu Debuchy	Lille
CB	(Brazil)	Hilton	Montpellier
CB	(Cameroon)	Nicolas N'Koulou	Marseille
LB	(Cameroon)	Henri Bedimo	Montpellier
DM	(France)	Rio Mavuba	Lille
DM	(France)	Étienne Capoue	Toulouse
RM	(Morocco)	Younès Belhanda	Montpellier
LM	(Belgium)	Eden Hazard	Lille
FW	(France)	Olivier Giroud	Montpellier
FW	(Brazil)	Nenê	Paris Saint-Germain

==== 2012–13 ====
Position	Nat.	Player	Club
GK	(Italy)	Salvatore Sirigu	Paris Saint-Germain
RB	(France)	Christophe Jallet	Paris Saint-Germain
CB	(Brazil)	Thiago Silva	Paris Saint-Germain
CB	(Cameroon)	Nicolas N'Koulou	Marseille
LB	(Brazil)	Maxwell	Paris Saint-Germain
DM	(Italy)	Marco Verratti	Paris Saint-Germain
DM	(France)	Blaise Matuidi	Paris Saint-Germain
RM	(France)	Dimitri Payet	Lille
LM	(France)	Mathieu Valbuena	Marseille
FW	(Gabon)	Pierre-Emerick Aubameyang	Saint-Étienne
FW	(Sweden)	Zlatan Ibrahimović	Paris Saint-Germain

==== 2013–14 ====
Position	Nat.	Player	Club
GK	(Italy)	Salvatore Sirigu	Paris Saint-Germain
RB	(Ivory Coast)	Serge Aurier	Toulouse
CB	(Brazil)	Thiago Silva	Paris Saint-Germain
CB	(France)	Loïc Perrin	Saint-Étienne
LB	(France)	Layvin Kurzawa	Monaco
DM	(Italy)	Marco Verratti	Paris Saint-Germain
DM	(Italy)	Thiago Motta	Paris Saint-Germain
RM	(France)	Alexandre Lacazette	Lyon
LM	(Colombia)	James Rodríguez	Monaco
FW	(Uruguay)	Edinson Cavani	Paris Saint-Germain
FW	(Sweden)	Zlatan Ibrahimović	Paris Saint-Germain

==== 2014–15 ====
Position	Nat.	Player	Club
GK	(France)	Steve Mandanda	Marseille
RB	(France)	Christophe Jallet	Lyon
CB	(Brazil)	Thiago Silva	Paris Saint-Germain
CB	(Brazil)	David Luiz	Paris Saint-Germain
LB	(Brazil)	Maxwell	Paris Saint-Germain
MF	(Italy)	Marco Verratti	Paris Saint-Germain
MF	(France)	Dimitri Payet	Marseille
MF	(Argentina)	Javier Pastore	Paris Saint-Germain
FW	(France)	Nabil Fekir	Lyon
FW	(Sweden)	Zlatan Ibrahimović	Paris Saint-Germain
FW	(France)	Alexandre Lacazette	Lyon

==== 2015–16 ====
Position	Nat.	Player	Club
GK	(France)	Steve Mandanda	Marseille
RB	(Ivory Coast)	Serge Aurier	Paris Saint-Germain
CB	(Brazil)	Thiago Silva	Paris Saint-Germain
CB	(Brazil)	David Luiz	Paris Saint-Germain
LB	(Brazil)	Maxwell	Paris Saint-Germain
MF	(France)	Lassana Diarra	Marseille
MF	(Italy)	Marco Verratti	Paris Saint-Germain
MF	(France)	Blaise Matuidi	Paris Saint-Germain
FW	(France)	Hatem Ben Arfa	Nice
FW	(Sweden)	Zlatan Ibrahimović	Paris Saint-Germain
FW	(Argentina)	Ángel Di María	Paris Saint-Germain

==== 2016–17 ====
Position	Nat.	Player	Club
GK	(Croatia)	Danijel Subašić	Monaco
RB	(France)	Djibril Sidibé	Monaco
CB	(Poland)	Kamil Glik	Monaco
CB	(Brazil)	Thiago Silva	Paris Saint-Germain
LB	(France)	Benjamin Mendy	Monaco
MF	(Italy)	Marco Verratti	Paris Saint-Germain
MF	(Portugal)	Bernardo Silva	Monaco
MF	(Ivory Coast)	Jean Michaël Seri	Nice
FW	(France)	Alexandre Lacazette	Lyon
FW	(Uruguay)	Edinson Cavani	Paris Saint-Germain
FW	(France)	Kylian Mbappé	Monaco

==== 2017–18 ====
Position	Nat.	Player	Club
GK	(France)	Steve Mandanda	Marseille
RB	(Brazil)	Dani Alves	Paris Saint-Germain
CB	(Brazil)	Marquinhos	Paris Saint-Germain
CB	(Brazil)	Thiago Silva	Paris Saint-Germain
LB	(France)	Ferland Mendy	Lyon
MF	(Brazil)	Luiz Gustavo	Marseille
MF	(Italy)	Marco Verratti	Paris Saint-Germain
MF	(France)	Nabil Fekir	Lyon
FW	(Brazil)	Neymar	Paris Saint-Germain
FW	(Uruguay)	Edinson Cavani	Paris Saint-Germain
FW	(France)	Kylian Mbappé	Paris Saint-Germain

==== 2018–19 ====
Position	Nat.	Player	Club
GK	(France)	Mike Maignan	Lille
RB	(France)	Kenny Lala	Strasbourg
CB	(Brazil)	Marquinhos	Paris Saint-Germain
CB	(Brazil)	Thiago Silva	Paris Saint-Germain
LB	(France)	Ferland Mendy	Lyon
MF	(Argentina)	Ángel Di María	Paris Saint-Germain
MF	(France)	Tanguy Ndombele	Lyon
MF	(Italy)	Marco Verratti	Paris Saint-Germain
FW	(Ivory Coast)	Nicolas Pépé	Lille
FW	(France)	Kylian Mbappé	Paris Saint-Germain
FW	(Brazil)	Neymar	Paris Saint-Germain

==== 2020–21 ====
Position	Nat.	Player	Club
GK	(Costa Rica)	Keylor Navas	Paris Saint-Germain
RB	(France)	Jonathan Clauss	Lens
CB	(Brazil)	Marquinhos	Paris Saint-Germain
CB	(France)	Presnel Kimpembe	Paris Saint-Germain
LB	(Mozambique)	Reinildo Mandava	Lille
MF	(France)	Aurélien Tchouaméni	Monaco
MF	(Brazil)	Lucas Paquetá	Lyon
MF	(France)	Benjamin André	Lille
FW	(Netherlands)	Memphis Depay	Lyon
FW	(Brazil)	Neymar	Paris Saint-Germain
FW	(France)	Kylian Mbappé	Paris Saint-Germain

==== 2021–22 ====
Position	Nat.	Player	Club
GK	(Italy)	Gianluigi Donnarumma	Paris Saint-Germain
RB	(France)	Jonathan Clauss	Lens
CB	(Brazil)	Marquinhos	Paris Saint-Germain
CB	(France)	William Saliba	Marseille
LB	(Portugal)	Nuno Mendes	Paris Saint-Germain
MF	(France)	Dimitri Payet	Marseille
MF	(France)	Aurélien Tchouaméni	Monaco
MF	(Ivory Coast)	Seko Fofana	Lens
FW	(France)	Martin Terrier	Rennes
FW	(France)	Wissam Ben Yedder	Monaco
FW	(France)	Kylian Mbappé	Paris Saint-Germain

==== 2022–23 ====
Position	Nat.	Player	Club
GK	(France)	Brice Samba	Lens
RB	(Morocco)	Achraf Hakimi	Paris Saint-Germain
CB	(Democratic Republic of the Congo)	Chancel Mbemba	Marseille
CB	(Austria)	Kevin Danso	Lens
LB	(Portugal)	Nuno Mendes	Paris Saint-Germain
MF	(France)	Khéphren Thuram	Nice
MF	(France)	Valentin Rongier	Marseille
MF	(Ivory Coast)	Seko Fofana	Lens
FW	(Argentina)	Lionel Messi	Paris Saint-Germain
FW	(Belgium)	Loïs Openda	Lens
FW	(France)	Kylian Mbappé	Paris Saint-Germain

==== 2023–24 ====
Position	Nat.	Player	Club
GK	(Italy)	Gianluigi Donnarumma	Paris Saint-Germain
RB	(Morocco)	Achraf Hakimi	Paris Saint-Germain
CB	(Brazil)	Marquinhos	Paris Saint-Germain
CB	(France)	Leny Yoro	Lille
LB	(France)	Bradley Locko	Brest
MF	(Portugal)	Vitinha	Paris Saint-Germain
MF	(France)	Warren Zaïre-Emery	Paris Saint-Germain
MF	(France)	Pierre Lees-Melou	Brest
FW	(France)	Ousmane Dembélé	Paris Saint-Germain
FW	(Gabon)	Pierre-Emerick Aubameyang	Marseille
FW	(France)	Kylian Mbappé	Paris Saint-Germain

==== 2024–25 ====
Position	Nat.	Player	Club
GK	(France)	Lucas Chevalier	Lille
RB	(Morocco)	Achraf Hakimi	Paris Saint-Germain
CB	(Brazil)	Marquinhos	Paris Saint-Germain
CB	(Ecuador)	Willian Pacho	Paris Saint-Germain
LB	(Portugal)	Nuno Mendes	Paris Saint-Germain
MF	(Portugal)	João Neves	Paris Saint-Germain
MF	(Portugal)	Vitinha	Paris Saint-Germain
MF	(France)	Rayan Cherki	Lyon
FW	(France)	Désiré Doué	Paris Saint-Germain
FW	(France)	Ousmane Dembélé	Paris Saint-Germain
FW	(France)	Bradley Barcola	Paris Saint-Germain

==== 2025–26 ====
Position	Nat.	Player	Club
GK	(France)	Robin Risser	Lens
RB	(Morocco)	Achraf Hakimi	Paris Saint-Germain
CB	(Ecuador)	Willian Pacho	Paris Saint-Germain
CB	(France)	Malang Sarr	Lens
LB	(Portugal)	Nuno Mendes	Paris Saint-Germain
MF	(Mali)	Mamadou Sangaré	Lens
MF	(France)	Corentin Tolisso	Lyon
MF	(Portugal)	Vitinha	Paris Saint-Germain
FW	(France)	Florian Thauvin	Lens
FW	(France)	Ousmane Dembélé	Paris Saint-Germain
FW	(England)	Mason Greenwood	Marseille

== Ligue 2 ==
=== Player of the Year ===
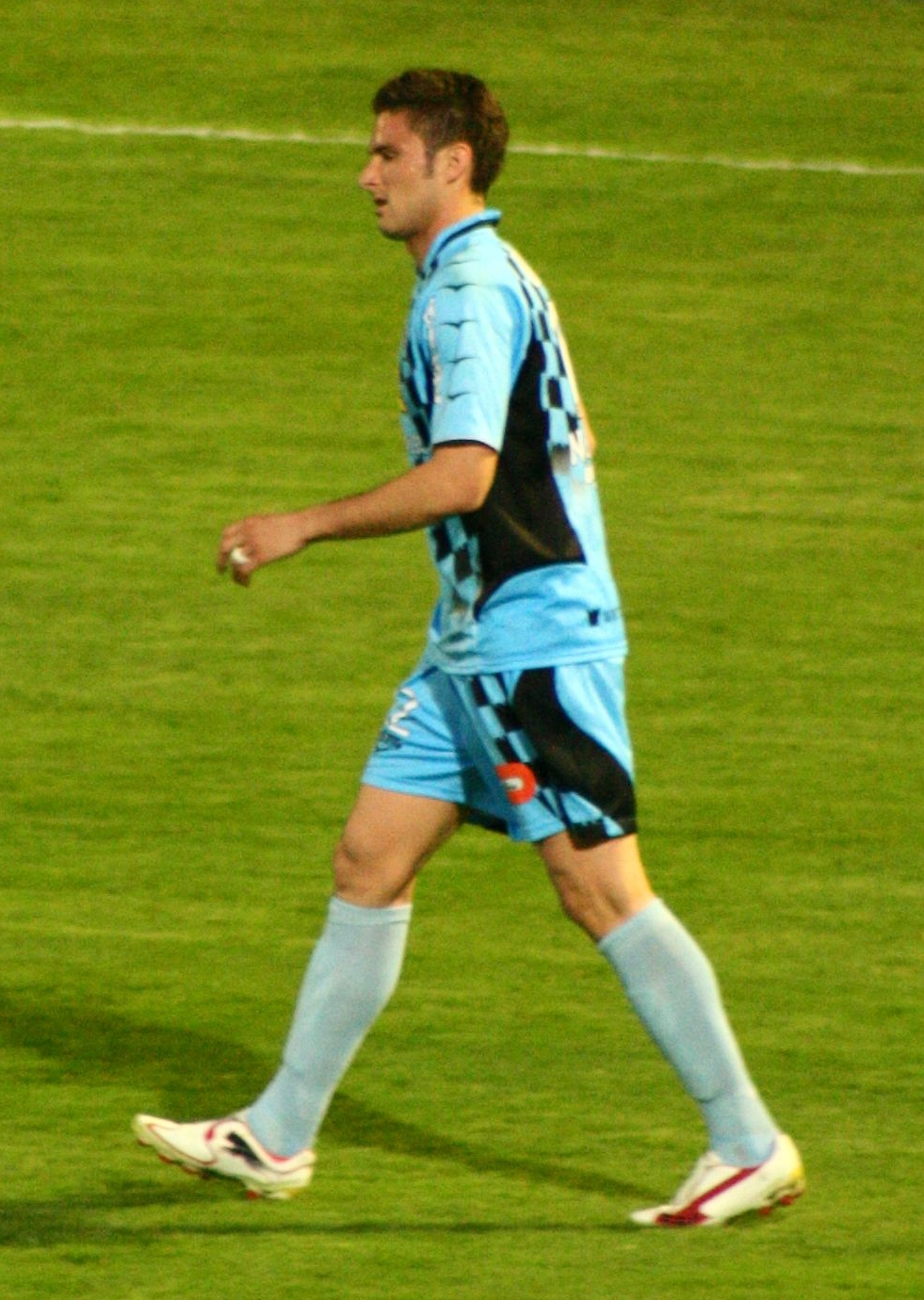
French international Olivier Giroud won the Ligue 2 Player of the Year award in 2010.

Year	Nat.	Player	Club
1994	(France)	Jocelyn Gourvennec	Rennes
1995	(France)	Tony Vairelles	Nancy
1996	(France)	Marcel Dib	Marseille
1997	(France)	Thierry Moreau	Toulouse
1998	(France)	Stéphane Pédron	Lorient
1999	(Algeria)	Kader Ferhaoui	Saint-Étienne
2000	(France)	Mickaël Pagis	Nîmes
2001	(Brazil)	Santos	Sochaux
2002	(France)	Alain Caveglia	Le Havre
2003	(France)	Cédric Fauré	Toulouse
2004	(France)	Xavier Gravelaine	Istres
2005	(Ivory Coast)	Bakari Koné	Lorient
2006	(Algeria)	Karim Ziani	Lorient
2007	(France)	Yoan Gouffran	Caen
2008	(France)	Guillaume Hoarau	Le Havre
2009	(Cameroon)	Paul Alo'o	Angers
2010	(France)	Olivier Giroud	Tours
2011	(Uruguay)	Sebastián Ribas	Dijon
2012	(France)	Jérôme Rothen	Bastia
2013	(France)	Giannelli Imbula	Guingamp
2014	(Senegal)	Diafra Sakho	Metz
2015	(France)	Jonathan Kodjia	Angers
2016	(Senegal)	Famara Diedhiou	Clermont
2017	(Trinidad and Tobago)	John Bostock	Lens
2018	(Brazil)	Diego	Reims
2019	(France)	Gaëtan Charbonnier	Brest
2020	Not awarded		
2021	(Morocco)	Amine Adli	Toulouse
2022	(Netherlands)	Branco van den Boomen	Toulouse
2023	(Georgia (country))	Georges Mikautadze	Metz
2024	(France)	Gauthier Hein	Auxerre
2025	(France)	Eli Junior Kroupi	Lorient
2026	(Georgia (country))	Zuriko Davitashvili	Saint-Étienne

=== Goalkeeper of the Year ===
Year	Nat.	Player	Club
2002	(France)	Stéphane Trévisan	Ajaccio
2003	(France)	Christophe Revault	Toulouse
2004	(France)	Jérémie Janot	Saint-Étienne
2005	(France)	Gennaro Bracigliano	Nancy
2006	(France)	Fabien Audard	Lorient
2007	(France)	Stéphane Cassard	Strasbourg
2008	(France)	Christophe Revault	Le Havre
2009	(Croatia)	Vedran Runje	Lens
2010	(France)	Steeve Elana	Brest
2011	(France)	Benoît Costil	Sedan
2012	(Brazil)	Macedo Novaes	Bastia
2013	(France)	Zacharie Boucher	Le Havre
2014	(France)	Alphonse Areola	Lens
2015	(Serbia)	Denis Petrić	Troyes
2016	(France)	Baptiste Reynet	Dijon
2017	(France)	Nicolas Douchez	Lens
2018	(France)	Paul Bernardoni	Clermont
2019	(France)	Vincent Demarconnay	Paris FC
2020	Not awarded		
2021	(France)	Gauthier Gallon	Troyes
2022	(France)	Benjamin Leroy	Ajaccio
2023	(France)	Arthur Desmas	Le Havre
2024	(France)	Gautier Larsonneur	Saint-Étienne
2025	(Switzerland)	Yvon Mvogo	Lorient
2026	(France)	Quentin Braat	Rodez

=== Manager of the Year ===
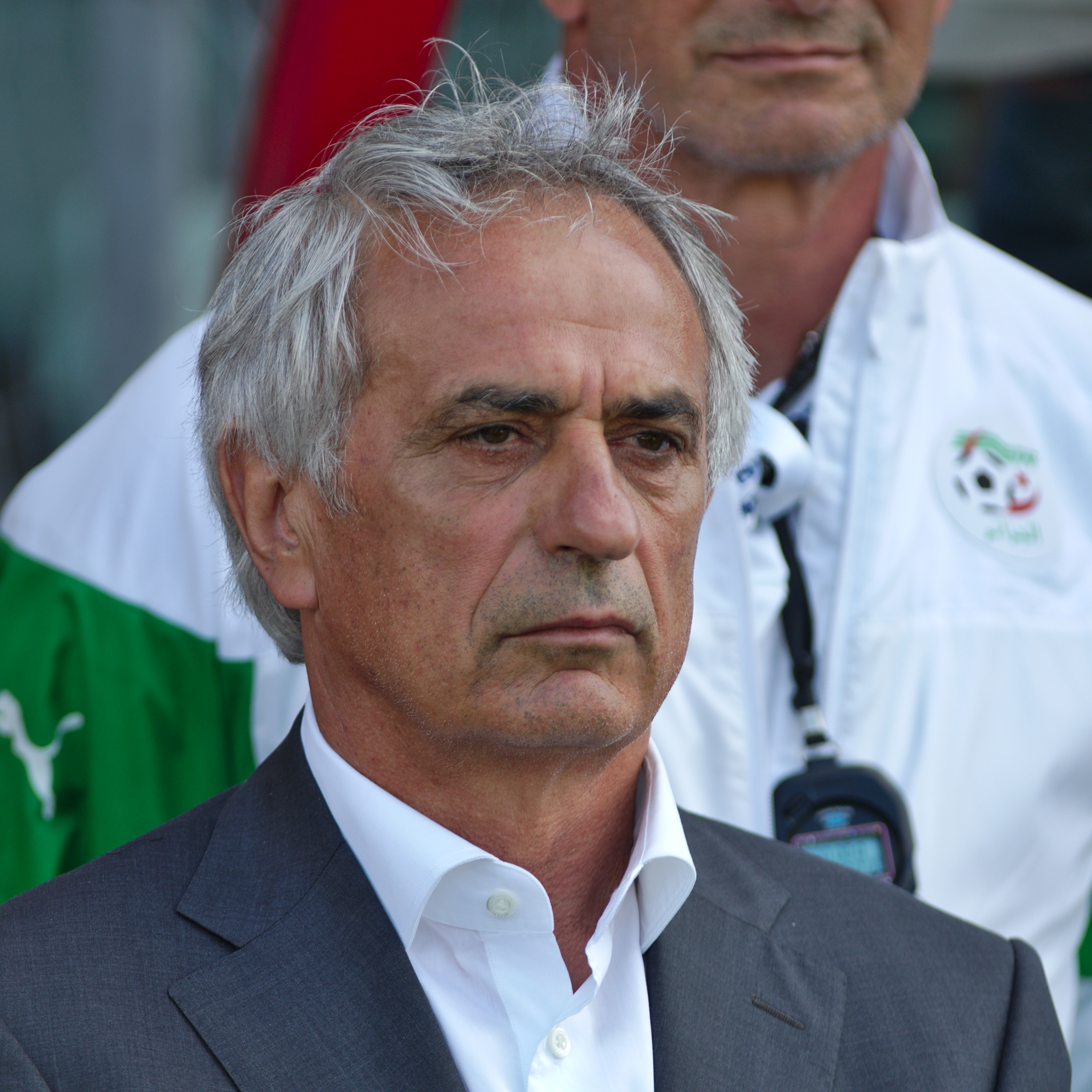
Vahid Halilhodžić was named Ligue 2 Manager of the Year in 2000, the year the award was introduced.

Year	Nat.	Manager	Club
2000	(Bosnia and Herzegovina)	Vahid Halilhodžić	Lille
2001	(France)	Jean Fernandez	Sochaux
2002	(France)	Jacky Bonnevay	Beauvais
2003	(France)	Erick Mombaerts	Toulouse
2004	(Bosnia and Herzegovina)	Mehmed Baždarević	Istres
2005	(France)	Jean-Marc Furlan	Troyes
2006	(France)	Antoine Kombouaré	Valenciennes
2007	(France)	Francis De Taddeo	Metz
2008	(France)	Jean-Marc Nobilo	Le Havre
2009	(France)	Philippe Montanier	Boulogne
2010	(France)	Alex Dupont	Brest
2011	(France)	Bernard Casoni	Evian
2012	(France)	Frédéric Hantz	Bastia
2013	(France)	Jocelyn Gourvennec	Guingamp
2014	(France)	Albert Cartier	Metz
2015	(France)	Jean-Marc Furlan	Troyes
2016	(France)	Olivier Dall'Oglio	Dijon
2017	(France)	Bernard Blaquart	Nîmes
2018	(France)	David Guion	Reims
2019	(France)	Pascal Gastien	Clermont
2020	Not awarded		
2021	(France)	Pascal Gastien	Clermont
2022	(France)	Philippe Montanier	Toulouse
2023	(Slovenia)	Luka Elsner	Le Havre
2024	(France)	Christophe Pélissier	Auxerre
2025	(France)	Olivier Pantaloni	Lorient
2026	(France)	Stéphane Dumont	Troyes

=== Team of the Year ===
Highlighted players had at least one prior appearance in Ligue 2's team of the year since 2003.

==== 2002–03 ====
Position	Nat.	Player	Club
GK	(France)	Christophe Revault	Toulouse
RB	(France)	Alexandre Dujeux	Châteauroux
CB	(France)	Stéphane Lièvre	Toulouse
CB	(France)	William Prunier	Toulouse
LB	(France)	Franck Signorino	Metz
DM	(France)	Grégory Proment	Metz
RM	(Cameroon)	Achille Emana	Toulouse
LM	(France)	Philippe Celdran	Le Mans
FW	(Gabon)	Daniel Cousin	Le Mans
FW	(Togo)	Emmanuel Adebayor	Metz
FW	(France)	Cédric Fauré	Toulouse

==== 2003–04 ====
Position	Nat.	Player	Club
GK	(France)	Jérémie Janot	Saint-Étienne
RB	(France)	Jérôme Foulon	Niort
CB	(Mali)	Brahim Thiam	Istres
CB	(Morocco)	Aziz Ben Askar	Caen
LB	(Democratic Republic of the Congo)	Hérita Ilunga	Saint-Étienne
DM	(France)	Fabrice Abriel	Amiens
RM	(France)	Julien Sablé	Saint-Étienne
LM	(France)	David Hellebuyck	Saint-Étienne
FW	(France)	Xavier Gravelaine	Istres
FW	(France)	David Suarez	Amiens
FW	(France)	Laurent Dufresne	Nancy

==== 2004–05 ====
Position	Nat.	Player	Club
GK	(France)	Gennaro Bracigliano	Nancy
RB	(France)	Juan-Luis Montero	Troyes
CB	(France)	Damien Perquis	Troyes
CB	(Senegal)	Pape Diakhaté	Nancy
LB	(Algeria)	Nadir Belhadj	Sedan
DM	(Morocco)	Kamel Chafni	Châteauroux
RM	(France)	Olivier Thomas	Le Mans
LM	(France)	Gaël Danic	Grenoble
AM	(France)	Benjamin Nivet	Troyes
FW	(France)	Sébastien Grax	Troyes
FW	(Ivory Coast)	Bakari Koné	Lorient

==== 2005–06 ====
Position	Nat.	Player	Club
GK	(France)	Fabien Audard	Lorient
RB	(France)	David Ducourtioux	Sedan
CB	(Mali)	Éric Chelle	Valenciennes
CB	(France)	Sylvain Marchal	Lorient
LB	(Algeria)	Nadir Belhadj	Sedan
DM	(France)	Ronald Zubar	Caen
RM	(France)	Stéphane Noro	Sedan
LM	(France)	Pascal Camadini	Bastia
AM	(Algeria)	Karim Ziani	Lorient
FW	(France)	Jean-Michel Lesage	Le Havre
FW	(France)	Steve Savidan	Valenciennes

==== 2006–07 ====
Position	Nat.	Player	Club
GK	(France)	Stéphane Cassard	Strasbourg
RB	(France)	Franck Béria	Metz
CB	(Senegal)	Pape Diop	Metz
CB	(Senegal)	Abasse Ba	Dijon
LB	(France)	Cédric Hengbart	Caen
DM	(France)	Grégory Proment	Caen
DM	(France)	Julien Cardy	Metz
AM	(France)	Yoan Gouffran	Caen
FW	(France)	Jean-Michel Lesage	Le Havre
FW	(France)	Julien Féret	Reims
FW	(Senegal)	Babacar Gueye	Metz

==== 2007–08 ====
Position	Nat.	Player	Club
GK	(France)	Christophe Revault	Le Havre
RB	(France)	Jérémy Henin	Le Havre
CB	(Haiti)	Jean-Jacques Pierre	Nantes
CB	(France)	Nicolas Gillet	Le Havre
LB	(France)	Rémi Maréval	Nantes
DM	(France)	Jamel Aït Ben Idir	Le Havre
RM	(Tunisia)	Fahid Ben Khalfallah	Angers
LM	(France)	Gaël Danic	Troyes
AM	(France)	David de Freitas	Nantes
FW	(France)	Guillaume Hoarau	Le Havre
FW	(France)	Grégory Thil	Boulogne

==== 2008–09 ====
Position	Nat.	Player	Club
GK	(Croatia)	Vedran Runje	Lens
RB	(France)	Yohan Demont	Lens
CB	(France)	Laurent Koscielny	Tours
CB	(Mali)	Éric Chelle	Lens
LB	(Portugal)	Marco Ramos	Lens
DM	(Guinea-Bissau)	Bocundji Ca	Tours
DM	(France)	Renaud Cohade	Strasbourg
AM	(Argentina)	Alberto Costa	Montpellier
FW	(France)	Grégory Thil	Boulogne
FW	(Cameroon)	Paul Alo'o	Angers
FW	(Colombia)	Víctor Montaño	Montpellier

==== 2009–10 ====
Position	Nat.	Player	Club
GK	(France)	Steeve Elana	Brest
RB	(Senegal)	Omar Daf	Brest
CB	(France)	Grégory Leca	Caen
CB	(France)	Paul Baysse	Sedan
LB	(France)	Grégory Tafforeau	Caen
CM	(France)	Bruno Grougi	Brest
AM	(France)	Benjamin Nivet	Caen
AM	(France)	Romain Hamouma	Laval
FW	(France)	Nolan Roux	Brest
FW	(France)	Olivier Giroud	Tours
FW	(France)	Anthony Modeste	Angers

==== 2010–11 ====
Position	Nat.	Player	Club
GK	(France)	Benoît Costil	Sedan
RB	(France)	Sébastien Corchia	Le Mans
CB	(France)	Grégory Cerdan	Le Mans
CB	(France)	Benjamin Genton	Le Havre
LB	(France)	Cédric Fabien	Boulogne
CM	(France)	Romain Alessandrini	Clermont
CM	(France)	Olivier Sorlin	Evian
AM	(France)	Rudy Haddad	Châteauroux
AM	(France)	Benjamin Corgnet	Dijon
FW	(Uruguay)	Sebastián Ribas	Dijon
FW	(France)	Sloan Privat	Clermont

==== 2011–12 ====
Position	Nat.	Player	Club
GK	(Brazil)	Macedo Novaes	Bastia
RB	(Comoros)	Kassim Abdallah	Sedan
CB	(France)	Anthony Weber	Reims
CB	(Guadeloupe)	Mickaël Tacalfred	Reims
LB	(Algeria)	Féthi Harek	Bastia
CM	(Tunisia)	Wahbi Khazri	Bastia
CM	(France)	Romain Alessandrini	Clermont
LM	(Guinea)	Sadio Diallo	Bastia
RM	(France)	Jérôme Rothen	Bastia
FW	(Cape Verde)	Ryan Mendes	Le Havre
FW	(Algeria)	Kamel Ghilas	Reims

==== 2012–13 ====
Position	Nat.	Player	Club
GK	(France)	Zacharie Boucher	Le Havre
RB	(France)	Jean Calvé	Caen
CB	(Italy)	Andrea Raggi	Monaco
CB	(Venezuela)	Gabriel Cichero	Nantes
LB	(Portugal)	Raphaël Guerreiro	Caen
CM	(France)	Gianelli Imbula	Guingamp
CM	(Morocco)	Mounir Obbadi	Monaco
LM	(France)	Valère Germain	Monaco
RM	(Serbia)	Filip Đorđević	Nantes
FW	(Romania)	Claudiu Keserü	Angers
FW	(Mali)	Mustapha Yatabaré	Guingamp

==== 2013–14 ====
Position	Nat.	Player	Club
GK	(France)	Alphonse Areola	Lens
RB	(France)	Romain Métanire	Metz
CB	(France)	Sylvain Marchal	Metz
CB	(Tunisia)	Alaeddine Yahia	Lens
LB	(France)	Ludovic Baal	Lens
CM	(France)	Benjamin Nivet	Troyes
CM	(France)	N'Golo Kanté	Caen
LM	(France)	Yannis Salibur	Clermont
RM	(Haiti)	Jeff Louis	Nancy
FW	(Senegal)	Diafra Sakho	Metz
FW	(Algeria)	Andy Delort	Tours

==== 2014–15 ====
Position	Nat.	Player	Club
GK	(Serbia)	Denis Petrić	Troyes
RB	(France)	Jonathan Martins Pereira	Troyes
CB	(Brazil)	Rincón	Troyes
CB	(Ivory Coast)	Ismaël Traoré	Brest
LB	(France)	Lionel Carole	Troyes
CM	(France)	Benjamin Nivet	Troyes
CM	(Senegal)	Cheikh N'Doye	Créteil
CM	(Senegal)	Mouhamadou Diaw	Chamois Niortais
FW	(France)	Jonathan Kodjia	Angers
FW	(France)	Mickaël Le Bihan	Le Havre
FW	(Cameroon)	Karl Toko Ekambi	Sochaux

==== 2015–16 ====
Position	Nat.	Player	Club
GK	(France)	Baptiste Reynet	Dijon
RB	(France)	Julien Cétout	Nancy
CB	(France)	Christopher Jullien	Dijon
CB	(France)	Clément Lenglet	Nancy
LB	(French Guiana)	Simon Falette	Brest
CM	(France)	Frédéric Sammaritano	Dijon
CM	(Tunisia)	Naïm Sliti	Red Star
CM	(France)	Yeni Ngbakoto	Metz
FW	(France)	Loïs Diony	Dijon
FW	(Senegal)	Famara Diedhiou	Clermont
FW	(Algeria)	Hamer Bouazza	Red Star

==== 2016–17 ====
Position	Nat.	Player	Club
GK	(France)	Nicolas Douchez	Lens
RB	(France)	Mickaël Alphonse	Sochaux
CB	(France)	Julian Jeanvier	Reims
CB	(Senegal)	Zakaria Diallo	Brest
LB	(France)	Ferland Mendy	Le Havre
CM	(Trinidad and Tobago)	John Bostock	Lens
CM	(France)	Benjamin Nivet	Troyes
CM	(France)	Abdellah Zoubir	Lens
FW	(Morocco)	Khalid Boutaïb	Strasbourg
FW	(Mali)	Adama Niane	Troyes
FW	(Morocco)	Rachid Alioui	Nîmes

==== 2017–18 ====
Position	Nat.	Player	Club
GK	(France)	Paul Bernardoni	Clermont
RB	(France)	Mickaël Alphonse	Sochaux
CB	(France)	Julian Jeanvier	Reims
CB	(Morocco)	Yunis Abdelhamid	Reims
LB	(France)	Vincent Le Goff	Lorient
CM	(France)	Téji Savanier	Nîmes
CM	(Brazil)	Diego	Reims
CM	(France)	Romain Philippoteaux	Auxerre
FW	(Turkey)	Umut Bozok	Nîmes
FW	(Morocco)	Rachid Alioui	Nîmes
FW	(Argentina)	Pablo Chavarría	Reims

==== 2018–19 ====
Position	Nat.	Player	Club
GK	(France)	Vincent Demarconnay	Paris FC
RB	(France)	Fabien Centonze	Lens
CB	(Zambia)	Stoppila Sunzu	Metz
CB	(Ghana)	John Boye	Metz
LB	(France)	Thomas Delaine	Metz
CM	(Algeria)	Farid Boulaya	Metz
CM	(France)	Renaud Cohade	Metz
CM	(France)	Alexis Claude-Maurice	Lorient
FW	(France)	Opa Nguette	Metz
FW	(France)	Gaëtan Charbonnier	Brest
FW	(Senegal)	Habib Diallo	Metz

==== 2020–21 ====
Position	Nat.	Player	Club
GK	(France)	Gauthier Gallon	Troyes
RB	(Algeria)	Akim Zedadka	Clermont
CB	(France)	Jimmy Giraudon	Troyes
CB	(Benin)	Cédric Hountondji	Clermont
LB	(Colombia)	Deiver Machado	Toulouse
CM	(Mali)	Rominigue Kouamé	Troyes
CM	(France)	Mathias Autret	Auxerre
CM	(France)	Florian Tardieu	Troyes
FW	(France)	Mickaël Le Bihan	Auxerre
FW	(Guinea)	Mohamed Bayo	Clermont
FW	(France)	Amine Adli	Toulouse

==== 2021–22 ====
Position	Nat.	Player	Club
GK	(France)	Benjamin Leroy	Ajaccio
RB	(Denmark)	Mikkel Desler	Toulouse
CB	(Denmark)	Rasmus Nicolaisen	Toulouse
CB	(France)	Anthony Rouault	Toulouse
LB	(Tunisia)	Ali Abdi	Caen
CM	(Netherlands)	Branco van den Boomen	Toulouse
CM	(Comoros)	Youssouf M'Changama	Guingamp
CM	(France)	Gauthier Hein	Auxerre
FW	(France)	Nathan Ngoumou	Toulouse
FW	(France)	Gaëtan Charbonnier	Auxerre
FW	(England)	Rhys Healey	Toulouse

==== 2022–23 ====
Position	Nat.	Player	Club
GK	(France)	Arthur Desmas	Le Havre
RB	(Algeria)	Kevin Van Den Kerkhof	Bastia
CB	(France)	Yoann Barbet	Bordeaux
CB	(Senegal)	Arouna Sangante	Le Havre
LB	(France)	Niels Nkounkou	Saint-Étienne
CM	(Morocco)	Benjamin Bouchouari	Saint-Étienne
CM	(Morocco)	Amir Richardson	Le Havre
CM	(Algeria)	Victor Lekhal	Le Havre
FW	(Nigeria)	Josh Maja	Bordeaux
FW	(Georgia (country))	Georges Mikautadze	Metz
FW	(Ivory Coast)	Jean-Philippe Krasso	Saint-Étienne

==== 2023–24 ====
Position	Nat.	Player	Club
GK	(France)	Gautier Larsonneur	Saint-Étienne
RB	(France)	Paul Joly	Auxerre
CB	(Brazil)	Jubal	Auxerre
CB	(France)	Anthony Briançon	Saint-Étienne
LB	(Tunisia)	Ali Abdi	Caen
CM	(France)	Gauthier Hein	Auxerre
CM	(Algeria)	Ilan Kebbal	Paris FC
CM	(Algeria)	Himad Abdelli	Angers
FW	(France)	Gaëtan Perrin	Auxerre
FW	(France)	Loïs Diony	Angers
FW	(Guinea-Bissau)	Alexandre Mendy	Caen

==== 2024–25 ====
Position	Nat.	Player	Club
GK	(Switzerland)	Yvon Mvogo	Lorient
RB	(France)	Alpha Sissoko	Guingamp
CB	(Senegal)	Moustapha Mbow	Paris FC
CB	(Tunisia)	Montassar Talbi	Lorient
LB	(France)	Matthieu Udol	Metz
CM	(France)	Laurent Abergel	Lorient
CM	(France)	Gauthier Hein	Metz
CM	(France)	Maxime Lopez	Paris FC
FW	(France)	Timothé Nkada	Rodez
FW	(Ivory Coast)	Jean-Philippe Krasso	Paris FC
FW	(France)	Eli Junior Kroupi	Lorient

==== 2025–26 ====
Position	Nat.	Player	Club
GK	(France)	Quentin Braat	Rodez
RB	(France)	Alec Georgen	Dunkerque
CB	(France)	Adrien Monfray	Troyes
CB	(France)	Abdoul Koné	Reims
LB	(France)	Jean Lambert Evans	Rodez
CM	(France)	Antoine Mille	Troyes
CM	(France)	Enzo Bardeli	Dunkerque
CM	(France)	Martin Adeline	Troyes
FW	(France)	Giovani Versini	Pau
FW	(Morocco)	Tawfik Bentayeb	Troyes
FW	(Georgia (country))	Zuriko Davitashvili	Saint-Étienne

== Première Ligue ==
Captain of the France national team Sonia Bompastor was named Player of the Year in 2004 and 2008.

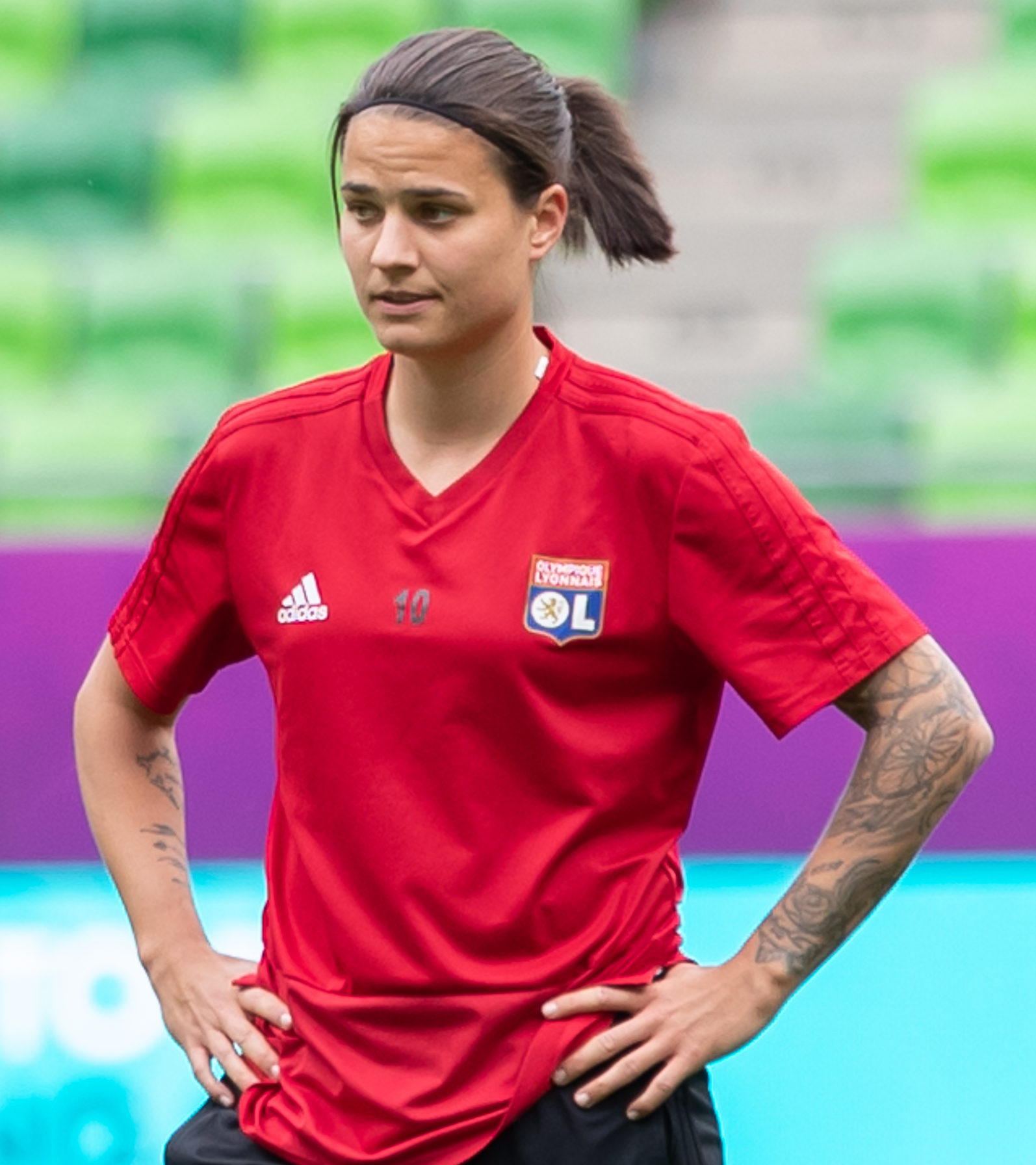
Dzsenifer Marozsán won the award three times in a row with Lyon.

=== Player of the Year ===
Year	Nat.	Player	Club
2001	(France)	Anne Zenoni	Toulouse
2002	(France)	Marinette Pichon	Saint-Memmie
2003	(France)	Sandrine Soubeyrand	Juvisy
2004	(France)	Sonia Bompastor	Montpellier
2005	(France)	Marinette Pichon	Juvisy
2006	(France)	Camille Abily	Montpellier
2007	(France)	Camille Abily	Lyon
2008	(France)	Sonia Bompastor	Lyon
2009	(France)	Louisa Nécib	Lyon
2010	(France)	Eugénie Le Sommer	Stade Briochin
2011	(France)	Élise Bussaglia	Paris Saint-Germain
2012	(France)	Gaëtane Thiney	Juvisy
2013	(Sweden)	Lotta Schelin	Lyon
2014	(France)	Gaëtane Thiney	Juvisy
2015	(France)	Eugénie Le Sommer	Lyon
2016	(France)	Amel Majri	Lyon
2017	(Germany)	Dzsenifer Marozsán	Lyon
2018	(Germany)	Dzsenifer Marozsán	Lyon
2019	(Germany)	Dzsenifer Marozsán	Lyon
2020	Not awarded		
2021	(France)	Kadidiatou Diani	Paris Saint-Germain
2022	(France)	Marie-Antoinette Katoto	Paris Saint-Germain
2023	(France)	Delphine Cascarino	Lyon
2024	(Malawi)	Tabitha Chawinga	Paris Saint-Germain
2025	(France)	Clara Mateo	Paris FC
2026	(Haiti)	Melchie Dumornay	Lyon

=== Young Player of the Year ===
Year	Nat.	Player	Club
2016	(France)	Griedge Mbock Bathy	Lyon
2017	(France)	Sakina Karchaoui	Montpellier
2018	(France)	Marie-Antoinette Katoto	Paris Saint-Germain
2019	(France)	Marie-Antoinette Katoto	Paris Saint-Germain
2020	Not awarded		
2021	(France)	Sandy Baltimore	Paris Saint-Germain
2022	(France)	Laurina Fazer	Paris Saint-Germain
2023	(France)	Laurina Fazer	Paris Saint-Germain
2024	(France)	Louna Ribadeira	Paris FC
2025	(France)	Tara Elimbi Gilbert	Paris Saint-Germain
2026	(France)	Justine Rouquet	Montpellier

=== Goalkeeper of the Year ===
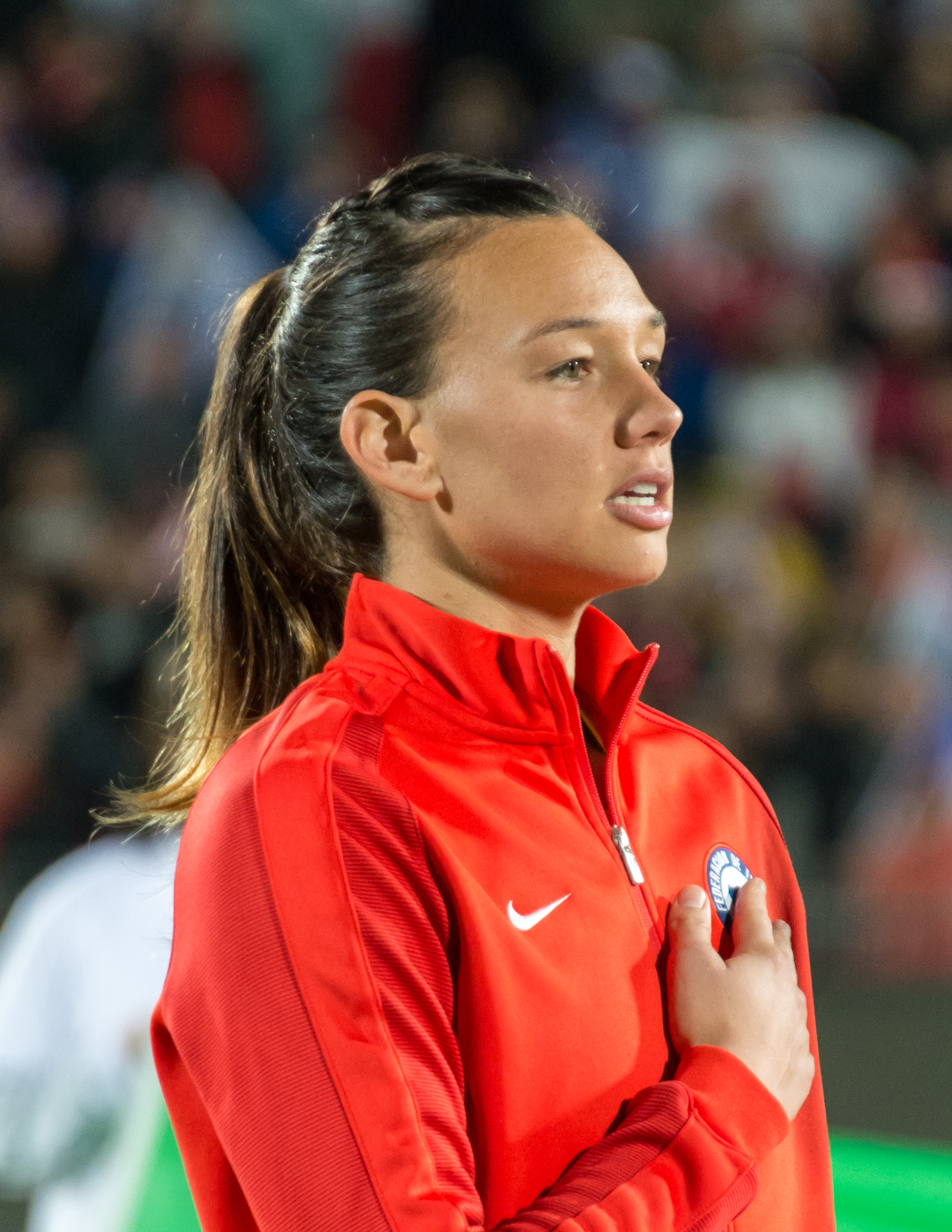
Christiane Endler, Goalkeeper of the Year three times in a row.

Year	Nat.	Player	Club
2021	(Chile)	Christiane Endler	Paris Saint-Germain
2022	(Chile)	Christiane Endler	Lyon
2023	(Chile)	Christiane Endler	Lyon
2024	(Nigeria)	Chiamaka Nnadozie	Paris FC
2025	(Chile)	Christiane Endler	Lyon
2026	(France)	Mylène Chavas	Paris FC

=== Team of the Year ===
Highlighted players had at least one prior appearance in Division 1 Féminine's team of the year since 2021.

==== 2020–21 ====
Position	Nat.	Player	Club
GK	(Chile)	Christiane Endler	Paris Saint-Germain
RB	(Canada)	Ashley Lawrence	Paris Saint-Germain
CB	(France)	Wendie Renard	Lyon
CB	(Spain)	Irene Paredes	Paris Saint-Germain
LB	(France)	Sakina Karchaoui	Lyon
CM	(Germany)	Dzsenifer Marozsán	Lyon
CM	(France)	Sandy Baltimore	Paris Saint-Germain
CM	(France)	Grace Geyoro	Paris Saint-Germain
FW	(France)	Delphine Cascarino	Lyon
FW	(France)	Marie-Antoinette Katoto	Paris Saint-Germain
FW	(France)	Kadidiatou Diani	Paris Saint-Germain

==== 2021–22 ====
Position	Nat.	Player	Club
GK	(Chile)	Christiane Endler	Lyon
RB	(Canada)	Ashley Lawrence	Paris Saint-Germain
CB	(France)	Wendie Renard	Lyon
CB	(Poland)	Paulina Dudek	Paris Saint-Germain
LB	(France)	Sakina Karchaoui	Paris Saint-Germain
CM	(United States)	Catarina Macario	Lyon
CM	(Germany)	Sara Däbritz	Paris Saint-Germain
CM	(France)	Grace Geyoro	Paris Saint-Germain
FW	(France)	Clara Matéo	Paris FC
FW	(France)	Marie-Antoinette Katoto	Paris Saint-Germain
FW	(France)	Kadidiatou Diani	Paris Saint-Germain

==== 2022–23 ====
Position	Nat.	Player	Club
GK	(Chile)	Christiane Endler	Lyon
RB	(Australia)	Ellie Carpenter	Lyon
CB	(France)	Wendie Renard	Lyon
CB	(France)	Élisa De Almeida	Paris Saint-Germain
LB	(France)	Sakina Karchaoui	Paris Saint-Germain
CM	(France)	Léa Le Garrec	Fleury
CM	(United States)	Lindsey Horan	Lyon
CM	(France)	Grace Geyoro	Paris Saint-Germain
FW	(France)	Delphine Cascarino	Lyon
FW	(France)	Kadidiatou Diani	Paris Saint-Germain
FW	(Ivory Coast)	Rosemonde Kouassi	Fleury

==== 2023–24 ====
Position	Nat.	Player	Club
GK	(Nigeria)	Chiamaka Nnadozie	Paris FC
RB	(Australia)	Ellie Carpenter	Lyon
CB	(France)	Élisa De Almeida	Paris Saint-Germain
CB	(France)	Griedge Mbock Bathy	Lyon
LB	(France)	Sakina Karchaoui	Paris Saint-Germain
CM	(France)	Grace Geyoro	Paris Saint-Germain
CM	(France)	Inès Benyahia	Le Havre
CM	(United States)	Lindsey Horan	Lyon
FW	(France)	Eugénie Le Sommer	Lyon
FW	(Malawi)	Tabitha Chawinga	Paris Saint-Germain
FW	(France)	Delphine Cascarino	Lyon

== Other awards ==
=== President of the Year ===
Year	Nat.	President	Club
2004	(France)	Jean-Pierre Louvel	Le Havre

=== Referee of the Year ===
- 2002: Gilles Veissière
- 2003: Gilles Veissière, Nelly Viennot
- 2004: Bertrand Layec
- 2005: Bruno Coué, Patrick Lhermitte, Vincent Texier
- 2006: Éric Poulat, Lionel Dagorne, Vincent Texier
- 2007: Bertrand Layec
- 2008: Stéphane Lannoy
- 2009: Antony Gautier, Clément Turpin
- 2010: Stéphane Lannoy, Eric Dansault, Laurent Hugo
- 2011: Antony Gautier, Clément Turpin, Nicolas Pottier
- 2012: Stéphane Lannoy
- 2014: Ruddy Buquet
- 2019: Clément Turpin
- 2021: Clément Turpin, Cyril Gringore (Ligue 1)
  Bartolomeu Varela, Cyril Saint-Cricq (Ligue 2)
- 2022: Benoît Bastien, Cyril Gringore (Ligue 1)
  Olivier Thual, Stephan Pignatelli (Ligue 2)
- 2023: François Letexier, Hicham Zakrani (Ligue 1)
  Pierre Legat, Julien Pacelli (Ligue 2)
- 2024: François Letexier, Nicolas Danos (Ligue 1)
  Nicolas Rainville, Florian Goncalves (Ligue 2)

=== UNFP Trophy of Honour ===
- 1996: Jean-Luc Ettori
- 2003: Alain Roche
- 2004: Laurent Blanc
- 2005: Marcel Desailly
- 2006: Lyon
- 2007: Zinedine Zidane
- 2008: France 98
- 2009: Lilian Thuram
- 2010: Claude Makélélé
- 2011: Just Fontaine, Michel Hidalgo, Philippe Piat, Sylvain Kastendeuch
- 2012: France women's national team
- 2013: Grégory Coupet
- 2014: Mickaël Landreau
- 2015: Eric Abidal
- 2016: France Euro 2000 team
- 2017: Raymond Kopa
- 2019: Didier Drogba
- 2024: France 1984 Olympics team

=== UNFP Special Trophy ===
- 2005: Corinne Diacre
- 2007: Nelly Viennot
- 2008: Just Fontaine
- 2012: Mathieu Bodmer
- 2013: Bernard Diomède
- 2014: Peace and Sport
- 2021: Corentin Tolisso
- 2022: Mamadou Sakho
- 2024: Raphaël Varane

=== UNFP 20 Year Special Team Trophy ===
Year	Goalkeeper	Defenders	Midfielders	Forwards
2011	Fabien Barthez	Bixente Lizarazu; Lilian Thuram; Laurent Blanc; Christian Karembeu	Franck Ribéry; Patrick Vieira; Robert Pires; Zinedine Zidane	Pauleta; Jean-Pierre Papin

== See also ==
- List of sports awards honoring women
- UNFP Player of the Month
