= 2007–08 Ligue 2 =

69th season of the second-tier football league in France

Ligue 2
- Season: 2007–08
- Champions: Le Havre
- Promoted: Nantes; Grenoble
- Relegated: Niort; Libourne-Saint-Seurin; Gueugnon
- Top goalscorer: (France) Guillaume Hoarau (28)

The Ligue 2 season 2007–08 was the sixty-sixth since its establishment, and started in August 2007. The fixtures were announced in June 2007.

FC Metz, the champions of Ligue 2, SM Caen, and RC Strasbourg were promoted to France's top division Ligue 1. Whereas, Troyes AC, CS Sedan, and FC Nantes were relegated to Ligue 2. The first matches of the season were played on 27 July 2007, and the season ended on 16 May 2008. The new Ligue 2 champions were crowned on 2 May 2008 when Le Havre AC drew with Montpellier HSC following FC Nantes's loss to Amiens SC that same day. As champions, Le Havre will be promoted to France's highest football division Ligue 1 for the upcoming 2008-09 season. For finishing in 2nd place and 3rd, both FC Nantes and Grenoble Foot 38 achieved promotion as well.

The relegation places were filled by FC Gueugnon, who were relegated after losing to AC Ajaccio on 18 April 2008. FC Libourne-Saint-Seurin, who were relegated after to CS Sedan on 2 May 2008 and Chamois Niortais FC, who were relegated on the final day after losing to US Boulogne who were occupying the last relegation place coming into the final day.

== 20 participating teams ==
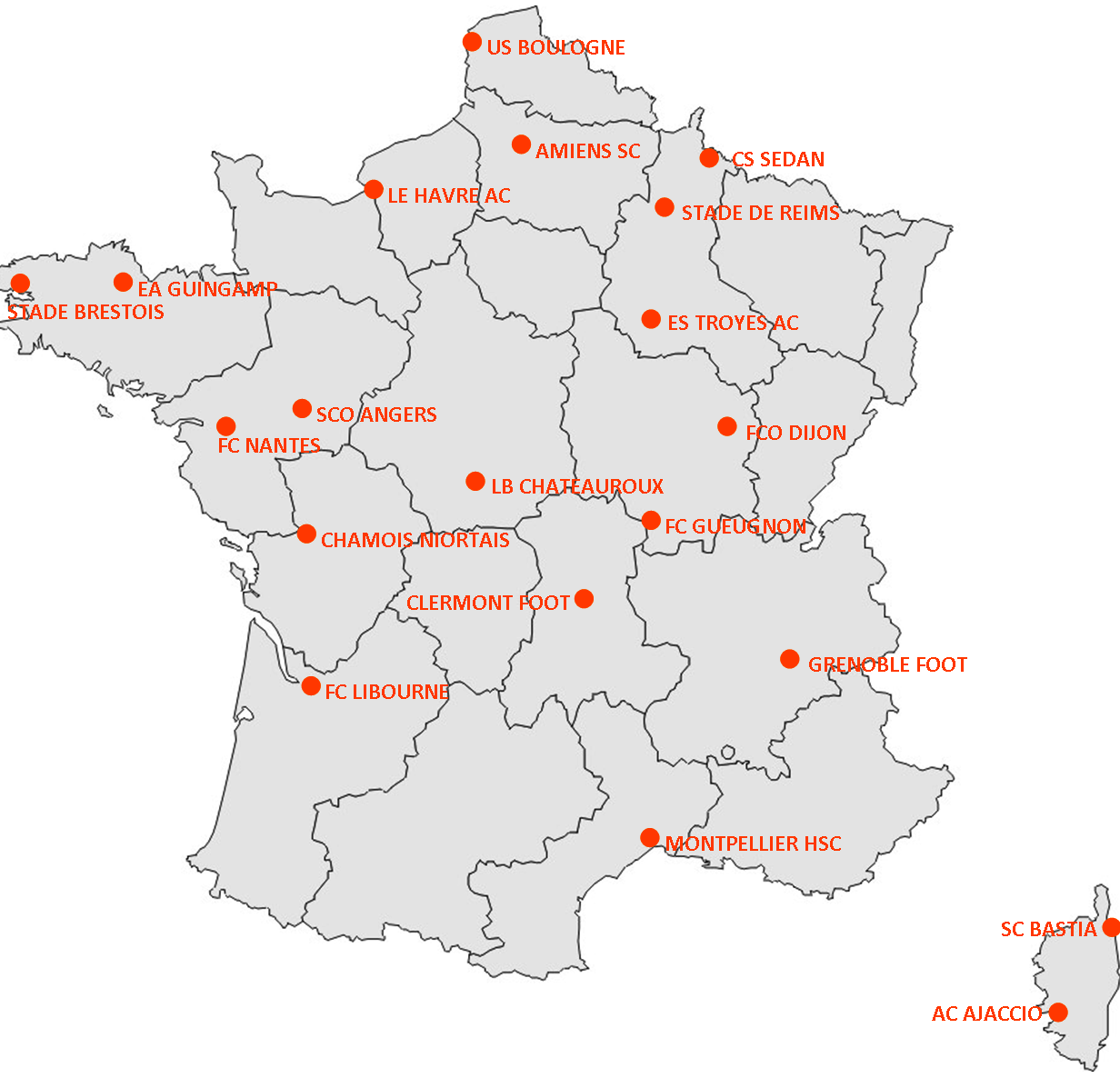

- AC Ajaccio
- Amiens SC
- Angers SCO
- US Boulogne
- SC Bastia
- Stade Brestois
- LB Châteauroux
- Clermont Foot
- Dijon FCO
- Grenoble Foot 38
- FC Gueugnon
- En Avant Guingamp
- Le Havre AC
- FC Libourne-Saint-Seurin
- Montpellier HSC
- FC Nantes Atlantique
- Chamois Niortais FC
- Stade de Reims
- CS Sedan Ardennes
- Troyes AC

== League table ==
Pos	Team	Pld	W	D	L	GF	GA	GD	Pts	Promotion or Relegation
1	Le Havre (C, P)	38	22	12	4	66	30	+36	78	Promotion to Ligue 1
2	Nantes (P)	38	19	13	6	58	34	+24	70	Promotion to Ligue 1
3	Grenoble (P)	38	17	12	9	44	30	+14	63	Promotion to Ligue 1
4	Sedan	38	15	13	10	46	40	+6	58	
5	Clermont	38	14	15	9	50	41	+9	57	
6	Troyes	38	15	12	11	46	44	+2	57	
7	Brest	38	15	12	11	38	38	0	57	
8	Montpellier	38	14	12	12	43	32	+11	54	
9	Ajaccio	38	14	12	12	37	41	−4	54	
10	Angers	38	13	14	11	39	35	+4	53	
11	SC Bastia	38	14	9	15	45	46	−1	49 (Note: Bastia have been deducted two points by the Discipline Commission following an incident away to Libourne-Saint-Seurin on September 14, 2007.)	
12	Guingamp	38	11	15	12	41	37	+4	48	
13	Stade Reims	38	12	10	16	44	52	−8	46	
14	Amiens	38	11	12	15	49	51	−2	45	
15	Châteauroux	38	11	12	15	34	42	−8	45	
16	Boulogne	38	12	7	19	37	54	−17	43	
17	Dijon	38	9	15	14	32	51	−19	42	
18	Niort (R)	38	11	8	19	38	48	−10	41	Relegation to Championnat National
19	Libourne-Saint-Seurin (R)	38	7	11	20	41	62	−21	32	Relegation to Championnat National
20	Gueugnon (R)	38	5	12	21	39	59	−20	27	Relegation to Championnat National

Source: Ligue 2
(C) Champions; (P) Promoted; (R) Relegated

== Results ==
Home \ Away	AJA	AMI	ANG	BAS	BOU	BRS	CHA	CLR	DIJ	GRE	GUE	GUI	LHA	LIB	MHS	NAN	NRT	REI	SED	TRO
Ajaccio		1–0	1–1	1–3	2–2	1–1	0–1	3–1	1–1	2–1	2–0	1–1	0–3	2–3	2–1	2–1	2–1	0–0	2–1	1–0
Amiens	4–0		2–0	1–1	2–1	1–1	1–2	0–0	2–2	1–2	4–4	3–1	1–3	1–0	1–1	2–1	0–2	1–0	2–1	0–0
Angers	1–0	2–0		1–1	2–1	0–0	3–0	2–1	0–0	0–2	2–0	2–1	1–2	1–0	1–1	0–0	1–1	1–0	1–1	0–1
Bastia	0–1	1–0	0–1		4–0	4–0	2–3	0–0	0–0	0–0	1–0	0–1	0–2	2–1	1–1	0–1	2–2	1–2	3–1	1–0
Boulogne	0–0	2–1	1–0	2–0		2–0	1–3	1–2	0–1	0–1	0–0	0–2	0–3	1–0	2–0	4–0	1–0	1–0	0–1	1–2
Brest	0–1	1–0	1–0	3–1	3–0		2–1	1–1	0–0	1–0	2–1	1–1	0–2	1–0	1–0	1–2	4–2	1–0	1–1	0–0
Châteauroux	0–0	1–1	2–2	1–1	1–0	1–2		1–0	2–0	1–0	1–1	0–0	0–0	2–0	1–0	1–2	1–0	0–1	1–1	1–3
Clermont	2–0	4–2	2–0	2–3	0–0	1–0	0–0		3–0	0–0	1–0	3–3	1–0	1–1	3–2	2–1	1–0	4–1	2–1	1–2
Dijon	1–1	1–0	1–3	2–1	0–2	2–2	0–0	3–1		0–0	2–1	1–0	2–3	3–1	0–2	0–0	1–3	2–2	1–1	2–2
Grenoble	0–0	2–2	0–0	1–0	1–2	3–1	0–0	2–0	2–0		3–1	0–0	0–2	1–0	2–0	0–3	3–1	2–0	0–0	2–0
Gueugnon	0–2	1–2	2–1	0–1	0–1	0–1	3–1	1–1	3–0	1–1		0–1	3–4	2–2	1–2	1–1	1–0	0–1	2–3	1–1
Guingamp	1–1	1–0	1–0	0–1	4–2	1–0	2–2	0–0	0–0	1–2	0–1		1–1	1–1	0–2	0–0	0–0	2–1	2–1	5–0
Le Havre	2–0	2–2	3–2	6–0	2–0	1–1	2–0	1–0	1–0	0–0	4–1	2–1		1–1	0–0	1–0	1–1	2–0	0–0	0–0
Libourne-St-Seurin	1–2	2–5	1–1	2–4	2–2	0–0	1–0	1–1	2–0	1–2	2–0	2–1	3–1		1–3	2–3	0–2	1–1	1–1	2–0
Montpellier	1–0	2–0	1–0	2–1	3–0	2–1	1–0	2–3	1–1	0–1	0–0	0–0	0–0	5–0		0–0	1–0	0–0	0–0	3–0
Nantes	2–1	3–1	1–1	2–0	3–0	3–0	2–1	2–2	2–1	1–0	0–0	1–1	0–1	2–2	1–1		1–1	5–0	2–1	2–0
Niort	2–0	1–3	0–1	1–3	2–1	0–1	2–1	1–0	3–0	2–1	2–2	1–3	0–3	2–1	1–0	0–1		0–1	0–1	0–0
Reims	0–0	0–0	0–1	1–2	4–1	0–0	2–0	0–0	0–1	3–4	2–1	3–2	3–3	2–1	2–1	3–3	3–1		3–1	0–1
Sedan	2–1	1–1	2–2	0–0	1–1	2–0	2–1	2–2	0–1	2–1	3–1	1–0	2–1	1–0	3–1	1–2	1–0	2–1		0–1
Troyes	0–1	1–0	2–2	2–0	2–2	1–3	2–0	2–2	3–0	2–2	2–2	1–0	4–1	2–0	2–1	0–2	1–1	4–2	0–1	

Source: Ligue 2
Legend: Blue = home team win; Yellow = draw; Red = away team win.

== Top goalscorers ==
Last updated May 16, 2008

The top goalscorer was awarded to Le Havre AC's Guillaume Hoarau finishing with a stunning 28 goals averaging a goal per 118 minutes.

Rank	Player	Club	Goals
1	(France) Guillaume Hoarau	Le Havre	28
2	(France) Grégory Thil	Boulogne	16
2	(France) Cédric Fauré	Reims	16
4	(Angola) Titi Buengo	Amiens	14
5	(Algeria) Nassim Akrour	Grenoble	13
6	(Cameroon) Paul Alo'o	Angers	12
6	(France) Xavier Pentecôte	Bastia	12
6	(France) Stéphane Noro	Troyes	12
9	(Senegal) Souleymane Camara	Montpellier	11
9	(Romania) Claudiu Keșerü	Libourne-Saint-Seurin	11

== Managers ==
Club	Head coach
Ajaccio	(Germany) Gernot Rohr
Amiens	(France) Ludovic Batelli
Angers	(France) Jean-Louis Garcia
Bastia	(France) Bernard Casoni
Boulogne	(France) Philippe Montanier
Brest	(France) Pascal Janin
Châteauroux	(France) Cédric Daury then Christian Sarramagna
Clermont	(France) Didier Ollé-Nicolle
Dijon	(France) Serge Romano then (Bosnia and Herzegovina) Faruk Hadžibegić
Grenoble	(Bosnia and Herzegovina) Mehmed Baždarević
Gueugnon	(France) Alain Ravera then Alex Dupont
Guingamp	(France) Patrick Rémy then Victor Zvunka
Le Havre	(France) Jean Marc Nobilo
Libourne-Saint-Seurin	(France) Didier Tholot
Montpellier	(France) Rolland Courbis
Nantes	(Armenia) Michel Der Zakarian
Niort	(France) Jacky Bonnevay then Samuel Michel
Stade Reims	(France) Thierry Froger
Sedan	(France) José Pasqualetti
Troyes	(France) Denis Troch

== Stadia ==
Last updated August 8, 2008

Team	Stadium	Capacity	Avg. attendance
AC Ajaccio	Stade François Coty	12,000	2,218
Amiens SC	Stade de la Licorne	12,097	9,427
Angers SCO	Stade Jean Bouin	17,000	6,973
SC Bastia	Stade Armand Cesari	12,000	2,685
US Boulogne	Stade de la Libération	7,300	5,180
Stade Brest 29	Stade Francis-Le Blé	10,189	5,730
LB Châteauroux	Stade Gaston Petit	17,173	6,520
Clermont Foot	Stade Gabriel Montpied	10,363	5,368
Dijon FCO	Stade Gaston Gérard	7,900	4,890
Grenoble Foot 38	Stade des Alpes	20,000	9,999
FC Gueugnon	Stade Jean Laville	13,827	2,830
En Avant Guingamp	Stade du Roudourou	18,126	9,043
Le Havre AC	Stade Jules Deschaseaux	16,454	11,632
FC Libourne-Saint-Seurin	Stade Jean-Antoine Moueix	8,000	2,608
Montpellier HSC	Stade de la Mosson	32,900	7,247
FC Nantes	Stade de la Beaujoire	32,285	22,771
Chamois Niortais FC	Stade René Gaillard	10,988	5,358
Stade Reims	Stade Auguste Delaune	25,000	6,861
CS Sedan Ardennes	Stade Louis Dugauguez	23,189	9,590
Troyes AC	Stade de l'Aube	21,877	10,110
