= 2008–09 Ligue 2 =

70th season of the second-tier football league in France

Ligue 2
- Season: 2008–09
- Champions: Lens
- Promoted: Montpellier; Boulogne
- Relegated: Amiens; Reims; Troyes
- Europa League: Guingamp (Play-off round; via domestic cup)
- Goals scored: 864
- Average goals/game: 2.27
- Top goalscorer: (France) Grégory Thil (18)
- Biggest home win: Strasbourg 5–0 Nîmes (6 October 2008)
- Biggest away win: Angers 1–5 Boulogne (24 April 2009)
- Highest scoring: Bastia 6–2 Ajaccio (5 December 2008) (8 goals)

The Ligue 2 season 2008–09 was the sixty-seventh edition since its establishment, and began on 1 August 2008 and ended on 29 May 2009. The fixtures were announced on 23 May 2008.

== Promotion and relegation ==
Teams relegated to Ligue 2

- FC Metz, relegated after losing to Olympique Marseille on 12 April 2008.
- RC Strasbourg, relegated after losing to SM Caen on 10 May 2008.
- RC Lens, relegated after drawing with FC Girondins de Bordeaux on 17 May 2008.

Teams promoted to Ligue 1

- Le Havre AC, promoted after drawing with CS Sedan on 22 April 2008.
- FC Nantes, promoted after drawing with Montpellier HSC on 25 April 2008.
- Grenoble Foot 38, promoted after drawing with LB Châteauroux on 12 May 2008.

Teams promoted from Championnat National

- Vannes OC, promoted after losing to FC Martigues on 26 April 2008.
- Tours FC, promoted after defeating Stade Laval on 3 May 2008.
- Nimes Olympique, promoted after defeating Stade Laval on 16 May 2008.

Teams relegated to Championnat National

- FC Gueugnon, relegated after losing to AC Ajaccio on 18 April 2008.
- FC Libourne-Saint-Seurin, relegated after losing to CS Sedan on 2 May 2008.
- Chamois Niortais FC, relegated after losing to US Boulogne on 16 May 2008.

== League table ==
Pos	Team	Pld	W	D	L	GF	GA	GD	Pts	Promotion or Relegation
1	Lens (C, P)	38	20	8	10	47	35	+12	68	Promotion to Ligue 1
2	Montpellier (P)	38	19	9	10	61	36	+25	66	Promotion to Ligue 1
3	Boulogne (P)	38	20	6	12	51	36	+15	66	Promotion to Ligue 1
4	Strasbourg	38	18	11	9	57	45	+12	65	
5	Metz	38	17	12	9	48	35	+13	63	
6	Tours	38	17	10	11	50	41	+9	61	
7	Angers	38	13	14	11	46	42	+4	53	
8	Dijon	38	14	10	14	43	46	−3	52	
9	Sedan	38	13	12	13	46	49	−3	51	
10	Vannes	38	14	9	15	34	45	−11	51	
11	Bastia	38	13	9	16	38	47	−9	48	
12	Clermont	38	12	11	15	46	50	−4	47	
13	Guingamp (Q)	38	10	16	12	37	35	+2	46	Qualification to Europa League play-off round (Note: Coupe de France winners Guingamp qualify for the 2009–10 UEFA Europa League Play-off round of 2009–10 UEFA Europa League.)
14	Brest	38	13	6	19	45	50	−5	45	
15	Châteauroux	38	11	11	16	40	46	−6	44	
16	Ajaccio	38	11	11	16	44	56	−12	44	
17	Nîmes	38	11	11	16	32	46	−14	44	
18	Amiens (R)	38	9	16	13	35	40	−5	43	Relegation to Championnat National
19	Troyes (R)	38	9	11	18	39	48	−9	38	Relegation to Championnat National
20	Reims (R)	38	7	15	16	40	51	−11	36	Relegation to Championnat National

Source: Ligue 2
(C) Champions; (P) Promoted; (Q) Qualified for the phase indicated; (R) Relegated

== Results ==
Home \ Away	ACA	AMI	ANG	BAS	BOU	BRS	CHA	CLR	DIJ	GUI	RCL	MET	MHS	NMS	REI	SED	STR	TOU	TRO	VAN
Ajaccio		0–2	0–0	1–1	0–2	1–1	0–1	5–1	1–1	2–1	1–2	1–0	0–3	2–1	2–1	0–2	1–1	0–2	1–1	4–0
Amiens	2–0		1–1	0–1	1–1	2–1	1–1	0–0	1–1	3–3	0–0	1–1	2–0	0–1	2–0	0–0	1–1	0–0	1–1	0–2
Angers	0–1	1–0		2–0	1–5	1–2	1–1	4–2	2–0	0–1	2–2	1–1	3–3	2–2	3–1	3–0	3–0	2–0	0–0	0–1
Bastia	6–2	2–2	0–0		1–3	0–2	2–1	2–1	0–0	2–1	0–1	1–2	1–0	0–0	2–2	2–0	1–1	2–0	2–1	3–1
Boulogne	0–1	4–0	2–3	1–0		0–1	2–1	2–1	3–0	2–0	3–1	1–1	0–3	2–0	0–3	0–1	1–0	3–3	1–0	2–0
Brest	1–2	1–2	2–1	4–0	0–1		2–0	2–2	1–2	1–1	3–1	2–1	0–3	1–2	0–0	2–2	0–1	0–1	4–1	0–1
Châteauroux	2–1	1–0	0–1	2–0	1–0	5–1		1–0	2–0	1–1	0–0	1–1	1–1	0–0	0–0	1–1	0–1	1–1	0–1	1–0
Clermont	1–1	2–0	2–2	2–0	2–3	2–0	1–3		1–1	1–1	1–2	1–0	2–1	2–0	1–0	3–0	2–2	0–0	2–1	0–1
Dijon	2–1	2–1	0–2	2–0	1–0	1–2	2–0	2–0		2–3	1–0	0–1	1–0	2–1	1–1	1–0	1–3	2–1	1–1	3–0
Guingamp	0–0	0–0	0–0	4–1	3–0	2–0	2–1	2–1	1–1		0–0	0–1	0–1	1–0	0–2	1–1	1–2	3–1	0–0	1–1
Lens	0–1	2–0	3–0	1–0	0–1	2–0	1–0	2–1	3–1	1–0		0–1	0–2	1–0	1–0	1–3	4–1	0–0	1–1	2–1
Metz	3–2	2–1	0–1	0–0	1–2	1–0	1–0	1–3	2–0	2–0	1–2		3–1	0–0	0–0	2–0	3–2	1–0	1–1	2–0
Montpellier	2–1	2–1	1–0	2–1	0–0	3–2	3–0	2–1	4–1	0–0	0–1	1–2		1–1	2–2	3–1	2–1	1–1	3–0	3–1
Nîmes	2–2	1–1	1–1	1–0	0–1	0–1	1–0	1–1	2–1	1–0	1–2	1–1	2–1		2–2	2–1	0–2	0–1	1–0	1–0
Reims	1–3	1–3	0–0	2–0	1–1	0–1	4–3	1–1	1–4	0–0	1–2	1–1	0–4	2–1		0–1	4–1	0–0	0–0	3–1
Sedan	1–1	0–1	0–0	1–1	0–1	1–0	3–4	0–1	2–1	1–0	2–2	3–2	1–1	2–1	1–1		2–2	2–0	2–1	2–3
Strasbourg	3–1	2–1	2–0	1–0	1–0	2–2	2–1	2–0	0–0	0–2	1–1	0–0	1–0	5–0	3–2	1–3		4–0	0–0	2–1
Tours	4–1	0–0	3–1	0–1	3–1	2–0	3–1	2–0	0–0	1–0	3–1	1–4	0–0	4–1	2–1	2–1	2–0		4–3	1–0
Troyes	2–0	0–1	1–2	1–2	1–0	1–0	2–2	0–1	2–1	2–2	0–1	3–1	1–2	0–1	1–0	2–3	1–2	3–2		3–0
Vannes	1–1	2–1	2–0	0–1	0–0	0–3	3–0	1–1	1–1	0–0	2–1	1–1	1–0	1–0	1–0	0–0	2–2	1–0	1–0	

Source: Ligue 2
Legend: Blue = home team win; Yellow = draw; Red = away team win.

== Statistics ==
=== Top goalscorers ===
Grégory Thil wins the Ligue 2 Trophée du Meilleur Buteur.

Rank	Player	Club	Goals
1	(France) Grégory Thil	Boulogne	18
2	(Colombia) Víctor Montaño	Montpellier	15
2	(Senegal) Papiss Cissé	Metz	15
4	(Mali) Cheick Diabaté	Ajaccio	14
5	(France) James Fanchone	Strasbourg	13
5	(France) Toifilou Maoulida	Lens	13
7	(Cameroon) Paul Alo'o	Angers	12
7	(France) Richard Socrier	Brest	12
9	(Mali) Tenema N'Diaye	Tours	11
9	(Angola) Titi Buengo	Troyes	11
9	(Ivory Coast) Kandia Traoré	Strasbourg	11

Last updated: 30 May 2009
Source: Ligue 2

=== Assists table ===
Paul Alo'o wins the Ligue 2 Trophée du Meilleur Passeur.

Rank	Player	Club	Assists
1	(Cameroon) Paul Alo'o	Angers	12
2	(Argentina) Alberto Costa	Montpellier	11
3	(France) Johann Ramaré	Boulogne	10
3	(France) Yann Kermorgant	Reims	10
5	(France) Fatih Atik	Tours	8

Last updated: 30 May 2009
Source: Ligue 2

== UNFP Player of the Month ==
Month	Player	Club
August	(France) James Fanchone	RC Strasbourg
September	(France) Chakhir Belghazouani	RC Strasbourg
October	(Colombia) Víctor Montaño	Montpellier HSC
November	(France) Lilian Compan	Montpellier HSC
December	(Colombia) Víctor Montaño	Montpellier HSC
January	(Cameroon) Paul Alo'o	Angers SCO
February	(France) Toifilou Maoulida	RC Lens
March	(Romania) Claudiu Keserü	Tours FC
April	(Tunisia) Issam Jemâa	RC Lens

== Awards ==
=== Player of the Year ===
The nominees for Ligue 2 Player of the Year. The winner will be determine at the annual UNFP Awards on 24 May. The winner will be displayed in bold.

Player	Nationality	Club
**Paul Alo'o**	**Cameroon**	(France) **Angers SCO**
Alberto Costa	Argentina	(France) Montpellier HSC
Victor Montaño	Colombia	(France) Montpellier HSC
Grégory Thil	France	(France) US Boulogne

=== Keeper of the Year ===
The nominees for the Ligue 2 Goalkeeper of the Year. The winner will be displayed in bold.

Player	Nationality	Club
Johann Carrasso	France	(France) Montpellier HSC
Stéphane Cassard	France	(France) RC Strasbourg
Macedo Novaes	Brazil	(France) SC Bastia
**Vedran Runje**	**Croatia**	(France) **RC Lens**

=== Manager of the Year ===
The nominees for Manager of the Year. The winner will be displayed in bold.

Player	Nationality	Club
Stéphane Le Mignan	France	(France) Vannes OC
**Philippe Montanier**	**France**	(France) **US Boulogne**
Daniel Sanchez	France	(France) Tours FC
Jean-Guy Wallemme	France	(France) RC Lens

=== Team of the Year ===
Position		Player	Club
GK	(Croatia)	Vedran Runje	Lens
RB	(France)	Yohan Demont	Lens
CB	(France)	Laurent Koscielny	Tours
CB	(Mali)	Éric Chelle	Lens
LB	(Portugal)	Marco Ramos	Lens
DM	(Guinea-Bissau)	Bocundji Cá	Tours
DM	(France)	Renaud Cohade	Strasbourg
AM	(Argentina)	Alberto Costa	Montpellier
FW	(France)	Grégory Thil	Boulogne-sur-Mer
FW	(Cameroon)	Paul Alo'o	Angers
FW	(Colombia)	Victor Montaño	Montpellier

== Managers ==
Club	Head coach
Ajaccio	(Germany) Gernot Rohr, replaced in August by (France) José Pasqualetti
Amiens	(France) Ludovic Batelli, replaced in July by (France) Thierry Laurey
Angers	(France) Jean-Louis Garcia
Bastia	(France) Bernard Casoni
Boulogne	(France) Philippe Montanier
Brest	(France) Pascal Janin, replaced in December by (France) Gérald Baticle, replaced in May by (France) Alex Dupont
Châteauroux	(France) Christian Sarramagna, replaced in January by (France) Dominique Bijotat
Clermont	(France) Didier Ollé-Nicolle
Dijon	(Bosnia and Herzegovina) Faruk Hadžibegić
Guingamp	(France) Victor Zvunka
Lens	(France) Jean-Guy Wallemme
Metz	(France) Yvon Pouliquen
Montpellier	(France) Rolland Courbis
Nîmes	(France) Jean-Luc Vannuchi, replaced in December by (France) Jean-Michel Cavalli
Reims	(France) Didier Tholot, replaced in December by (France) Luis Fernandez
Sedan	(France) José Pasqualetti, replaced in July by (France) Landry Chauvin
Strasbourg	(France) Jean-Marc Furlan
Tours	(France) Daniel Sanchez
Troyes	(France) Denis Troch, replaced in July by (France) Ludovic Batelli, replaced in May by (France) Claude Robin
Vannes	(France) Stéphane Le Mignan

== Stadia ==
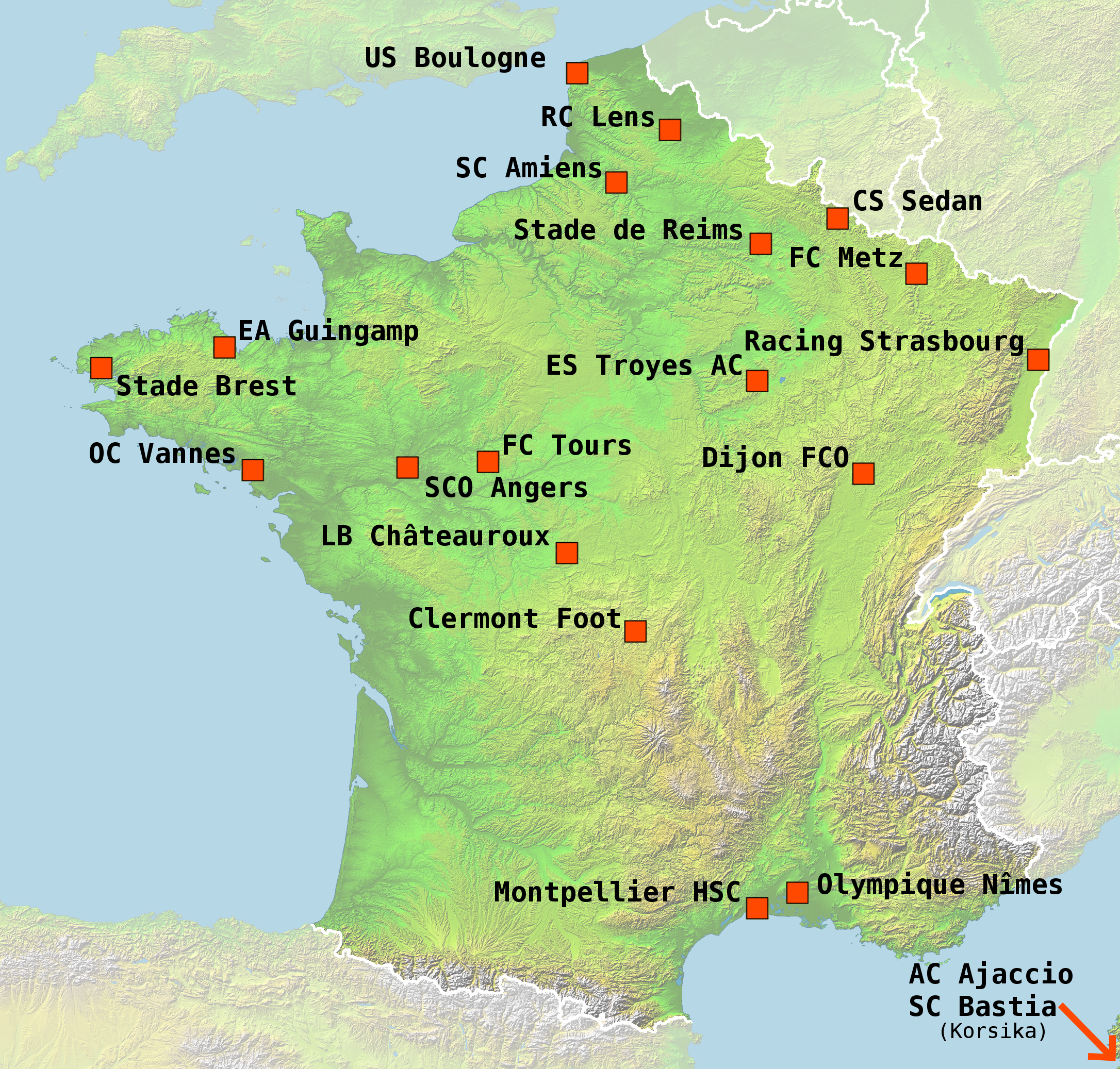
The locations of the 20 teams participating in Ligue 2 season 2008–09 (In German)

Last updated 22 May 2009

Team	Stadium	Capacity	Avg. attendance
Ajaccio	Stade François Coty	12,000	2,281
Amiens	Stade de la Licorne	12,097	9,368
Angers	Stade Jean Bouin	17,000	7,398
Bastia	Stade Armand Cesari	12,000	2,876
Boulogne	Stade de la Libération	7,300	5,604
Brest	Stade Francis-Le Blé	10,189	6,264
Châteauroux	Stade Gaston Petit	17,173	6,130
Clermont	Stade Gabriel Montpied	10,363	5,289
Dijon	Stade Gaston Gérard	7,900	3,764
Guingamp	Stade du Roudourou	18,126	9,437
Lens	Stade Félix-Bollaert	41,233	29,842
Metz	Stade Municipal Saint-Symphorien	26,700	9,628
Montpellier	Stade de la Mosson	32,900	8,397
Nîmes	Stade des Costières	18,482	9,193
Sedan	Stade Louis Dugauguez	23,189	8,736
Stade Reims	Stade Auguste Delaune	25,000	11,579
Strasbourg	Stade de la Meinau	29,230	14,193
Tours	Stade de la Vallée du Cher	13,500	6,898
Troyes	Stade de l'Aube	21,877	9,810
Vannes	Stade de la Rabine	8,000	3,571

== Teams by region ==
	Region	Number of teams	Teams
1	Bretagne	3	Brest, Guingamp and Vannes
1	Champagne-Ardenne	3	Reims and Sedan, Troyes
3	Centre	2	Châteauroux and Tours
3	Corsica	2	Ajaccio and Bastia
3	Languedoc-Roussillon	2	Montpellier and Nîmes
3	Nord-Pas de Calais	2	Lens and Boulogne
7
7	Alsace	1	Strasbourg
7	Auvergne	1	Clermont
7	Bourgogne	1	Dijon
7	Lorraine	1	Metz
7	Pays de la Loire	1	Angers
7	Picardie	1	Amiens
