= Grégory Thil =

French footballer (born 1980)

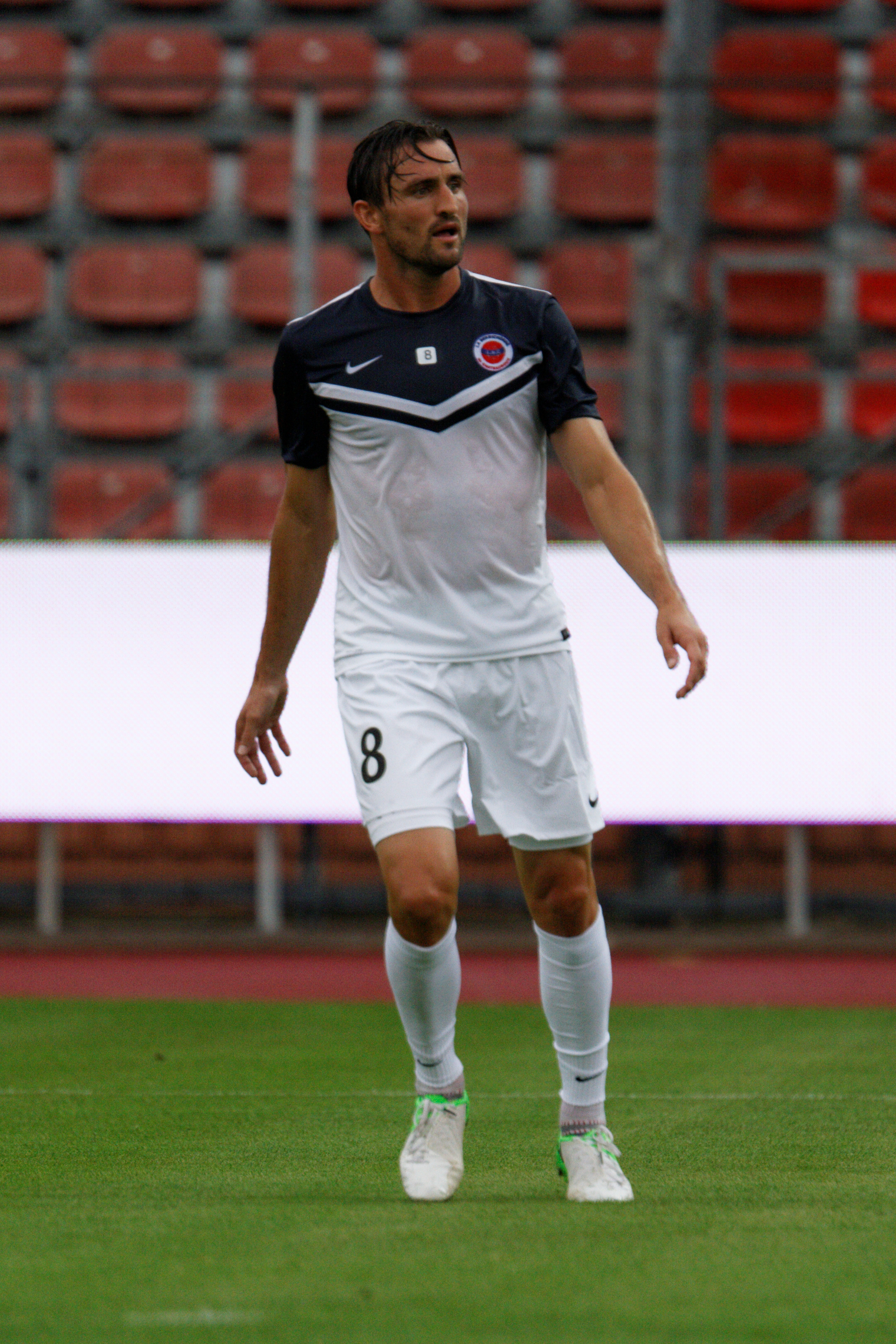
- Thil with Châteauroux in 2014

Personal information
- Date of birth: 15 March 1980 (age 46)
- Place of birth: Creil, France
- Height: 1.83 m (6 ft 0 in)
- Position: Forward

Youth career
- 1986–1998: US Balagny
- 1998–2001: US Mouy

Senior career*
Years	Team	Apps	(Gls)
2001–2005	Beauvais	98	(26)
2005–2011	Boulogne	204	(94)
2011–2015	Dijon	47	(5)
2014–2015	→ Châteauroux (loan)	37	(6)
2015–2018	Boulogne	95	(25)
2018–2019	Jura Sud	28	(12)
2019–2020	Racing Besançon	16	(10)
Total		525	(178)
- * Club domestic league appearances and goals

Grégory Thil (born 15 March 1980) is a French former professional footballer who played as a forward. He played at a professional level for Beauvais, Boulogne, Dijon, and Châteauroux, and is the all-time leading scorer for Boulogne.

== Career ==
Born in Creil, Thil began his career at Beauvais. In 2005, he moved to the French side Boulogne, then playing in Ligue 2, and was handed the number 10 shirt. He spent his career playing for Boulogne over the six years, making 165 appearances with 79 goals.

On 1 June 2011, Thil moved to the newly promoted Ligue 1 side Dijon. In July 2014, he was loaned to Châteauroux.

In 2015, Thil returned to Boulogne. He scored well over 100 goals in his career with Boulogne, making him the club's all time leading goal scorer.

On 13 June 2019, Thil joined Racing Besançon.

== Career statistics ==
Appearances and goals by club, season and competition
Club	Season	League			National cup		League cup		Total	
Club	Season	Division	Apps	Goals	Apps	Goals	Apps	Goals	Apps	Goals
Beauvais	2001–02	Ligue 2	10	1	0	0	1	0	11	1
Beauvais	2002–03	Ligue 2	32	4	2	3	3	0	37	7
Beauvais	2003–04	National	31	5	2	3	2	0	35	8
Beauvais	2004–05	CFA	25	16	1	0	0	0	26	16
Beauvais	Total		98	26	5	6	6	0	109	32
Boulogne	2005–06	National	38	10	0	0	0	0	38	10
Boulogne	2006–07	National	38	31	1	1	0	0	39	32
Boulogne	2007–08	Ligue 2	38	16	4	2	3	1	45	19
Boulogne	2008–09	Ligue 2	37	18	3	2	3	3	43	23
Boulogne	2009–10	Ligue 1	15	4	0	0	0	0	15	4
Boulogne	2010–11	Ligue 2	38	15	4	1	3	3	45	19
Boulogne	Total		204	94	12	6	9	7	225	107
Dijon	2011–12	Ligue 1	26	2	2	1	1	0	29	3
Dijon	2012–13	Ligue 2	6	1	0	0	2	1	8	2
Dijon	2013–14	Ligue 2	15	2	0	0	1	0	16	2
Dijon	Total		47	5	2	1	4	1	53	7
Châteauroux (loan)	2014–15	Ligue 2	37	6	3	1	1	1	41	8
Boulogne	2015–16	National	34	15	3	2	0	0	37	17
Boulogne	2016–17	National	33	8	0	0	0	0	33	8
Boulogne	2017–18	National	28	2	3	1	0	0	31	3
Boulogne	Total		95	25	6	3	0	0	101	28
Jura Sud	2018–19	National 2	28	12	0	0	0	0	28	12
Racing Besançon	2019–20	National 3	16	10	2	0	0	0	18	10
Career total			525	178	30	17	20	9	575	204
