= Pascal Janin =

French footballer and manager (born 1956)

Personal information
- Date of birth: 4 April 1956 (age 70)
- Place of birth: Saumur, France
- Position: Goalkeeper

Senior career*
Years	Team	Apps	(Gls)
1974–1981	Angers	159	(0)
1981–1984	Gueugnon	79	(0)
1984	Monaco	0	(0)
1984–1987	Orléans	90	(0)
1987–1988	Abbeville	31	(0)
1988–1989	Strasbourg	5	(0)

Managerial career
- 2007–2008: Brest
- 2009–2010: Strasbourg
- 2012–: Stade Malien
- * Club domestic league appearances and goals

Pascal Janin (born 4 April 1956) is a French football coach and former player who played as a goalkeeper. He is the current head coach of Stade Malien in the Malien Première Division.

== Career ==
He played as a goalkeeper for Ligue 1 and Ligue 2 sides Angers, Gueugnon, Monaco, Orléans, Abbeville, and Strasbourg.

== Coaching career ==
He coached Brest before Strasbourg, where he replaced Gilbert Gress. He was initially the goalkeeping coach of the side, and then caretaker manager. He was later confirmed as full-time manager.

Two and a half year after his dismissal from Strasbourg, in November 2012, Janin was named as head coach of Malian club Stade Malien.
