= Paul Alo'o =

Cameroonian footballer (born 1983)

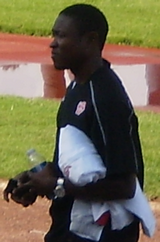

Personal information
- Full name: Paul Claudel Alo'o Efoulou
- Date of birth: 12 November 1983 (age 43)
- Place of birth: Yaoundé, Cameroon
- Height: 1.76 m (5 ft 9 in)
- Position: Striker

Team information
- Current team: Raon-l'Étape B (Manager)

Youth career
- 2001–2002: ASM Yaoundé

Senior career*
Years	Team	Apps	(Gls)
2002–2003	Mouscron	12	(1)
2003–2004	Racing Paris	23	(16)
2004–2007	Entente SSG	89	(35)
2007–2009	Angers	69	(24)
2009–2013	Nancy	60	(9)
2011–2012	→ Le Havre (loan)	18	(2)
2013–2016	Al-Taawon	72	(38)
2016–2017	Al-Sailiya	16	(4)
2017	→ Qatar SC (loan)	5	(9)
2017–2018	Martigues	18	(6)
2019	Amnéville	2	(0)
Total		380	(135)

International career
2009–2013	Cameroon	10	(0)

Managerial career
- 2019: Amnéville (assistant)
- 2020–2021: Lunéville B
- 2021–2022: Raon-l'Étape B (forward coach)
- 2022–: Raon-l'Étape B
- * Club domestic league appearances and goals

Paul Alo'o Efoulou (born 12 November 1983) is a Cameroonian former professional football manager and former player. He played as a striker.

== Club career ==
In the 2008–09 season Alo'o scored 12 goals and gave 12 assists in 35 Ligue 2 appearances for Angers. He was voted the league's best player of the season.

From 2013 Alo'o played in Saudi Arabia and Qatar.

He joined Championnat National 2 side Martigues in August 2017.

== International career ==
Alo'o made his debut for the Cameroon national team on 28 March 2009 against Togo in a qualifier for the 2010 World Cup in South Africa. He also played in three other qualifying matches for the same competition and the 2010 African Cup of Nations in Angola, but was not included in Paul Le Guen's 23-man squad for the 2010 FIFA World Cup.

== Coaching career ==
After retiring at the end of the 2018–19 season, Alo'o was hired as assistant coach at CSO Amnéville. He left the position at the end of the year. In May 2020, Alo'o was appointed manager of FC Lunéville's reserve team, which was playing in the Régional 3.

In May 2021, Alo'o was hired by US Raon-l'Étape as a forward coach for the clubs Régional 3 team (reserves) and manager of the futsal section. In July 2022, he was announced as the clubs new reserve manager.

== Honours ==
Individual

- Ligue 2 player of the season: 2008–09
