= Stéphane Cassard =

French footballer (born 1972)

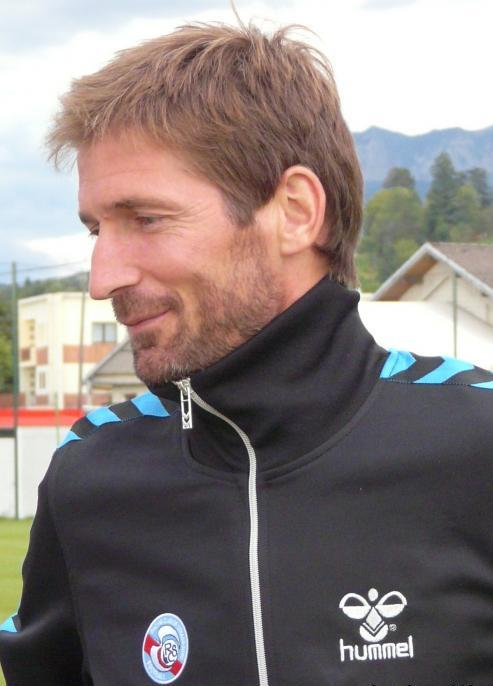
- Cassard in 2009

Personal information
- Date of birth: 11 November 1972 (age 53)
- Place of birth: Montbéliard, France
- Height: 1.84 m (6 ft 0 in)
- Position: Goalkeeper

Senior career*
Years	Team	Apps	(Gls)
1992–1997	Sochaux	148	(0)
1997–1998	Le Havre	38	(0)
1998–2000	Montpellier	27	(0)
2000–2001	Créteil	35	(0)
2001–2004	Troyes	20	(0)
2004–2010	Strasbourg	160	(0)
2010–2011	Boulogne	2	(0)
Total		430	(0)
- * Club domestic league appearances and goals

Stéphane Cassard (born 11 November 1972) is a French former professional footballer who played as a goalkeeper for Sochaux, Le Havre, Montpellier, Créteil, Troyes, Strasbourg and Boulogne.

He later worked as a goalkeeping coach at Marseille.

== Honours ==
Montpellier

- UEFA Intertoto Cup: 1999

Strasbourg

- Coupe de la Ligue: 2005
