= Christian Sarramagna =

French footballer and manager (born 1951)

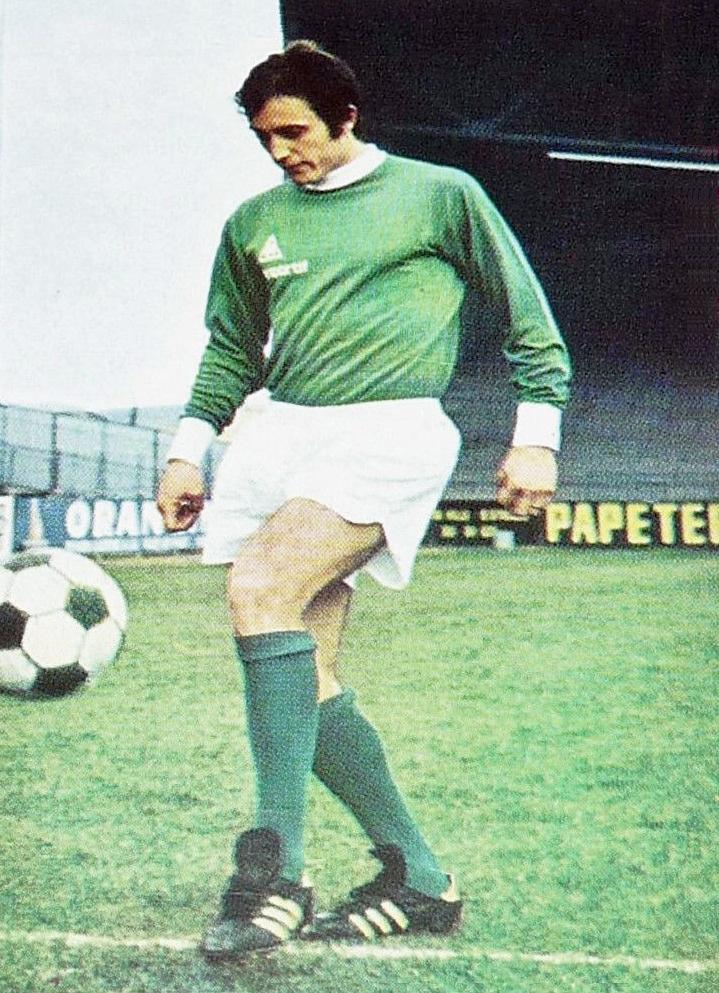

Personal information
- Date of birth: 29 December 1951 (age 74)
- Place of birth: Bayonne, France
- Height: 1.72 m (5 ft 8 in)
- Position: Striker

Youth career
- 1964–1968: Bayonne

Senior career*
Years	Team	Apps	(Gls)
1968–1979	Saint-Étienne	543	(218)
1979–1982	Montpellier	40	(10)
Total		583	(228)

International career
1973–1976	France	4	(0)

Managerial career
- 1982–1985: Le Grau du Roi
- 1985–1987: Pont Saint-Esprit
- 1990–1992: Saint-Étienne
- 1992–1994: Martigues
- 1994–1995: Sedan
- 1995–1997: Mulhouse
- 1998–2000: Mali
- 2000–2006: Bayonne
- 2006: Mali
- 2006–2007: Sète
- 2008: Châteauroux
- 2011–2012: CS Hammam-Lif
- * Club domestic league appearances and goals

Christian Sarramagna (born 29 December 1951) is a French football manager and former player. He is currently managing CS Hammam-Lif in the Tunisian Ligue Professionnelle 1.

== Titles ==
- As a player
  - French championship in 1974, 1975, 1976 with AS Saint-Étienne
  - Coupe de France 1974, 1975, and 1977 with AS Saint-Étienne
  - UEFA Champions League runner-up in 1976 with AS Saint-Étienne
