= Jacky Bonnevay =

French footballer and coach (born 1961)

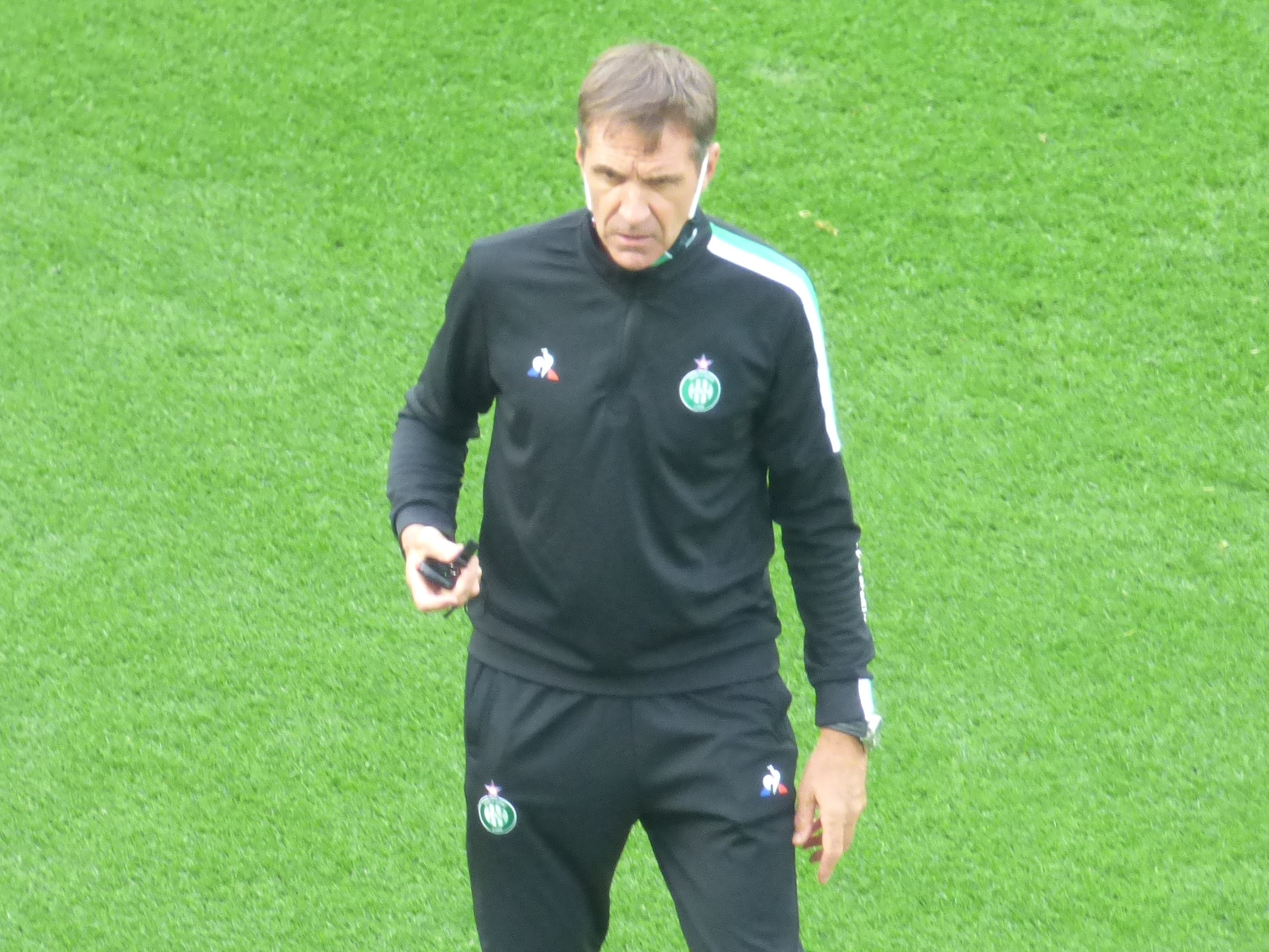
- Bonnevay with Saint-Étienne in 2020

Personal information
- Full name: Jacques Bonnevay
- Date of birth: 1 June 1961 (age 65)
- Place of birth: Le Coteau, France
- Position: Defender

Team information
- Current team: Saint-Étienne (assistant)

Senior career*
Years	Team	Apps	(Gls)
1976–1985	Sochaux	146	(1)
1985–1987	Marseille	62	(3)
1987–1988	Le Havre	24	(1)
1988–1991	Nice	89	(0)
1991–1993	Red Star	30	(1)
Total		351	(6)

Managerial career
- 1996–1997: Nancy (assistant)
- 1999–2002: Beauvais
- 2002: Troyes
- 2003–2004: Angers
- 2004–2005: Wydad Casablanca
- 2007–2008: Chamois Niortais
- 2009–2010: Nantes B
- 2012–2014: Niger (assistant)
- 2014: Trabzonspor (assistant)
- 2015–2018: Japan (assistant)
- 2018–2019: Leicester City (assistant)
- 2019–: Saint-Étienne (assistant)
- * Club domestic league appearances and goals

Jacques "Jacky" Bonnevay (born 1 June 1961) is a French football coach and former player, who is assistant manager of Saint-Étienne.

== Playing career ==
Bonnevay was born in Le Coteau, Loire. He played for Sochaux, Marseille, Le Havre, Nice and Red Star.

== Coaching career ==
After his playing career, he became a coach with AS Beauvais, Troyes, Angers, Wydad Casablanca and Chamois Niortais. He joined Nantes in June 2009 as the reserve team manager. He left at the end of the 2009–10 season.

From October 2012 to the summer 2014, Bonnevay worked as the assistant manager of the Niger national team. He then joined Trabzonspor under manager Vahid Halilhodžić as his assistant. The duo was fired after only four months. From March 2015 to April 2018, Bonnevay once again worked under Vahid Halilhodžić as his assistant for the Japan national team.

On 30 June 2018, he was announced as assistant manager to Claude Puel at Leicester City, following a restructure of the coaching staff at the club. On 24 February 2019, he left Leicester City following the sacking of manager Claude Puel. On 4 October 2019, Bonnevay once again followed Claude Puel, this time to Saint-Ètienne.
