= Ludovic Batelli =

French footballer (born 1963)

Personal information
- Date of birth: 24 May 1963 (age 63)
- Place of birth: Lens, France
- Height: 1.76 m (5 ft 9 in)
- Position: Goalkeeper

Team information
- Current team: Toulon

Youth career
- 1971–1976: Pont-à-Vendin
- 1976–1983: Lens

Senior career*
Years	Team	Apps	(Gls)
1983–1987	Valenciennes		
1987–1991	La Roche VF		
1991–1992	Annecy		
1992–1993	Lorient		

Managerial career
- 1993–1994: Luçon (assistant)
- 1995–1996: US Saint-Georges
- 1996–2000: Valenciennes
- 2000–2005: Amiens (youth)
- 2001–2005: Amiens B
- 2005–2006: FC Sète
- 2006–2008: Amiens
- 2008–2009: Troyes
- 2009–2012: Amiens
- 2013: R.W.S. Bruxelles
- 2013–2014: France U20
- 2014: France U16
- 2014–2015: France U18
- 2015–2016: France U19
- 2016–2017: France U20
- 2018–2019: United Arab Emirates U19
- 2021–: Toulon
- * Club domestic league appearances and goals

Ludovic Batelli (born 24 May 1963) is a French football manager and former professional player who manages SC Toulon. Under his management, the France U19 national team won their ninth European U19 title, defeating his ancestry homeland team Italy 4–0.

== Playing career ==
Batelli was born in Lens, Pas-de-Calais. He played as a goalkeeper.

== Managerial career ==
In March 2018, Batelli was announced as manager of the United Arab Emirates U19 national team.

In May 2021, he became head coach of SC Toulon for the 2021–22 season.
