= Bocundji Cá =

Bissau-Guinean footballer (born 1986)

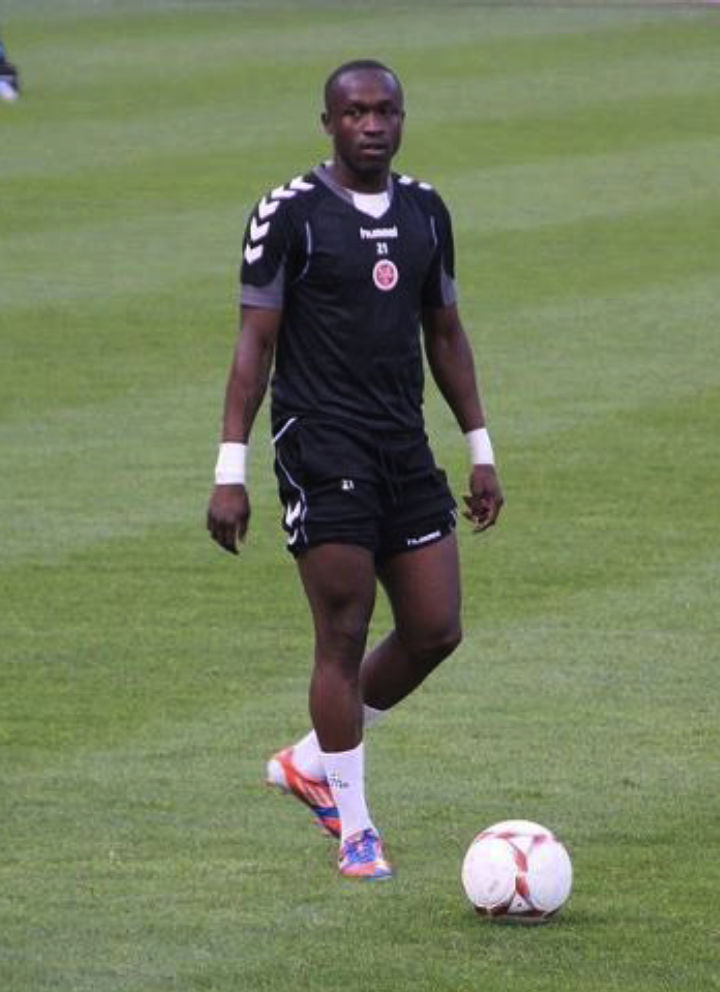
- Cá in 2013

Personal information
- Date of birth: 28 December 1986 (age 39)
- Place of birth: Biombo, Guinea-Bissau
- Height: 1.72 m (5 ft 8 in)
- Position: Central midfielder

Youth career
- 1999–2001: Bordeaux
- 2001–2004: Nantes

Senior career*
| Years | Team | Apps | (Gls) |
| 2004–2009 | Nantes | 49 | (1) |
| 2008 | → Tours (loan) | 15 | (0) |
| 2008–2009 | Tours | 32 | (1) |
| 2009–2011 | Nancy | 19 | (0) |
| 2010–2011 | → Tours (loan) | 34 | (0) |
| 2011–2015 | Reims | 78 | (1) |
| 2015 | Châteauroux | 11 | (0) |
| 2015–2016 | Paris FC | 16 | (0) |
| 2017–2018 | Bastia | 12 | (0) |
| Total | | 266 | (3) |

International career
| 2010–2016 | Guinea-Bissau | 19 | (0) |
- * Club domestic league appearances and goals

Bocundji Cá (born 28 December 1986) is a Bissau-Guinean former professional footballer who played as a midfielder. He spent the entirety of his career in France while playing for the Guinea-Bissau national team at international level.

== Club career ==
Born in Biombo, Guinea-Bissau, Cá played for French side FC Nantes's youth teams since 2002 and got his professional debut against Stade Rennais on 15 January 2005. Despite playing well for Nantes in the 2006–07 season, he suffered relegation at the end of the season.

On 31 May 2009, AS Nancy signed Cá until June 2012. After one year with Nancy he returned to play on loan for Tours FC. On 26 July 2011, he signed a three-year contract with Stade de Reims.

== International career ==
Cá was called up to the Guinea national team squad on 28 August 2006, qualifying due to family roots.
