= Stéphane Noro =

French footballer (born 1979)

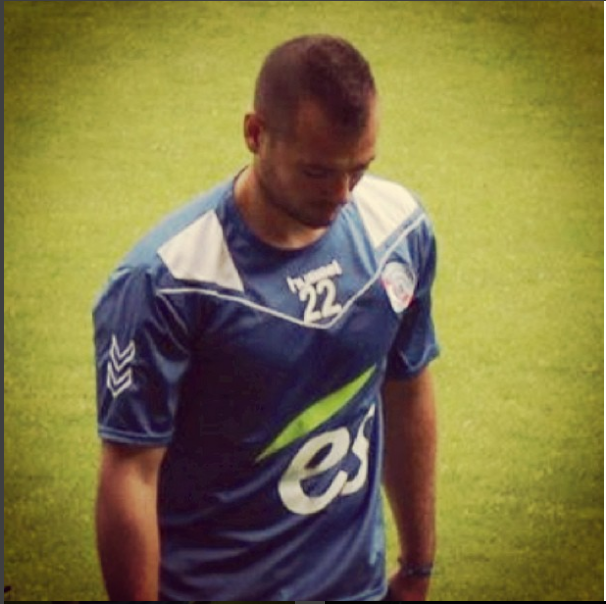
- Noro with Strasbourg in 2013

Personal information
- Date of birth: 22 January 1979 (age 47)
- Place of birth: Lille, France
- Height: 1.73 m (5 ft 8 in)
- Position: Midfielder

Senior career*
| Years | Team | Apps | (Gls) |
| 1996–2000 | Lille | 6 | (0) |
| 2000–2001 | Reims | 35 | (9) |
| 2001–2007 | Sedan | 145 | (26) |
| 2004 | → Metz (loan) | 7 | (0) |
| 2007–2008 | Troyes | 30 | (11) |
| 2008–2010 | Le Havre | 42 | (3) |
| 2011 | Strasbourg | 20 | (8) |
| 2011–2012 | Apollon Limassol | 23 | (4) |
| 2012–2014 | Strasbourg | 31 | (3) |
| Total | | 339 | (64) |

Managerial career
- 2022–: Lille B (assistant coach)
- * Club domestic league appearances and goals

Stéphane Noro (born 22 November 1979) is a French former professional footballer who played as a midfielder.
