= 2009 Coupe de la Ligue final =

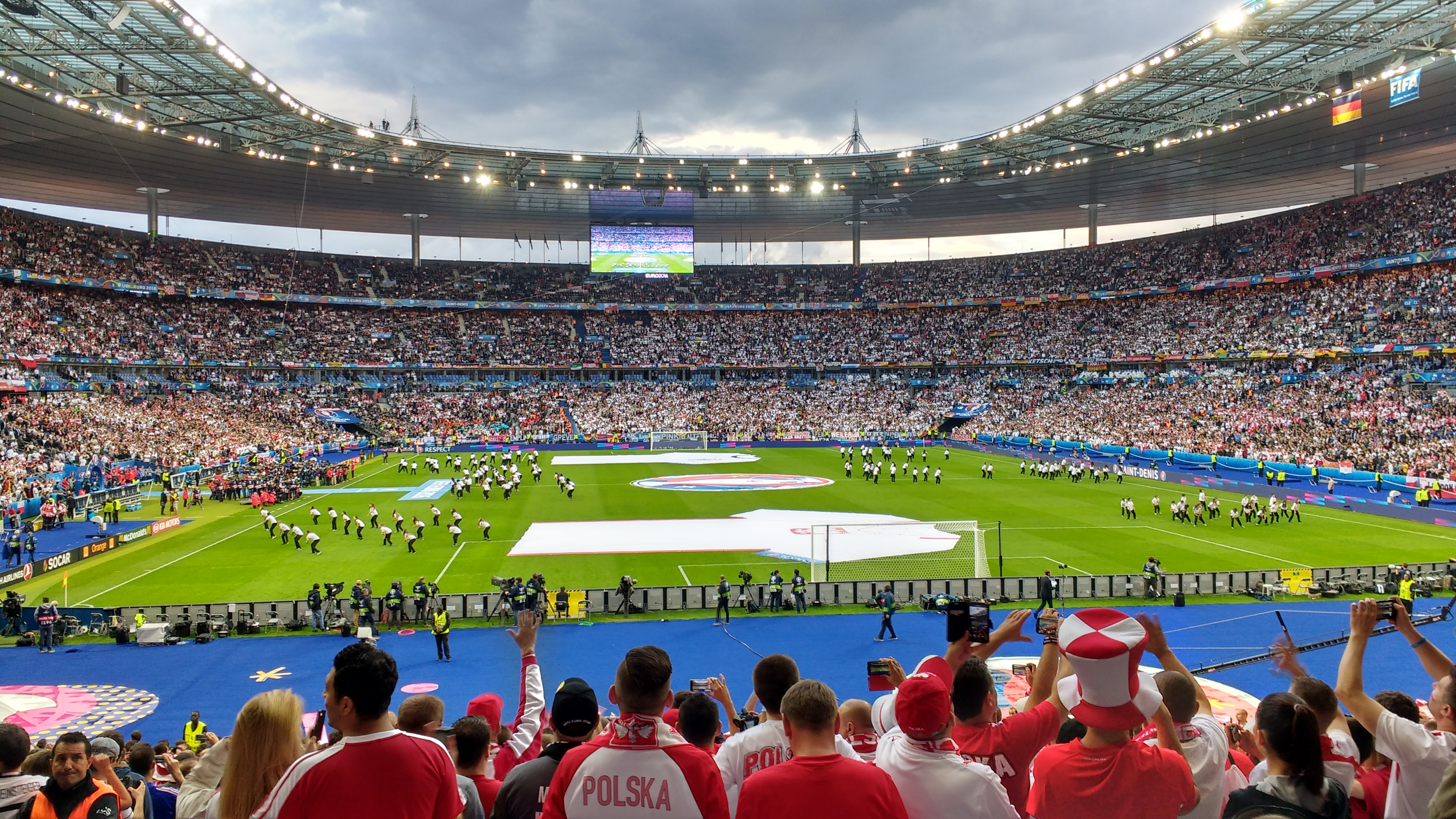
- Event: 2008–09 Coupe de la Ligue
Bordeaux	Vannes
Ligue 1	Ligue 2
4	0
- Date: 25 April 2009
- Venue: Stade de France, Saint-Denis
- Referee: (Lower Normandy) Fredy Fautrel
- Attendance: 75,000

The 2009 Coupe de la Ligue final was a football match held at the Stade de France in Saint-Denis on 25 April 2009. It was contested between Bordeaux of Ligue 1 and Vannes of Ligue 2. This was the first meeting between the two clubs.

This was Bordeaux's fifth appearance in the final, having won in 2002 and 2007 but losing in the 1997 and 1998 editions of the cup. This was Vannes's first ever appearance in the cup final. With their appearance, Vannes were the first ever club to reach the final after beginning from the first round.

Bordeaux won the match 4–0 after a fast start, scoring their first three goals inside of thirteen minutes.

== Match Report ==
Bordeaux got off to a fast start, in all aspects of the match, scoring in just the 2nd minute with the Brazilian Wendel chipping the ball over Vannes keeper Christophe Revel. Bordeaux then tripled their lead in a span of two minutes with Marc Planus scoring on a header off a corner kick from Wendel in the 10th minute and Yoan Gouffran scoring just his second goal for Bordeaux in the 12th minute off a free kick from Yoann Gourcuff, though the latter was first credited with the goal. However, after looking at the replay, it was determined that Gouffran got a slight head on the ball redirecting it slightly. Gourcuff would get his goal in the 40th minute scoring on a right footed shot just outside the box. The ball deflected off a Vannes defender before going into the back off the net. This goal gave Bordeaux a 4–0 lead heading into halftime.

== Route to the final ==
Note: In all results below, the score of the finalist is given first (H: home; A: away).

Bordeaux		Round	Vannes	
Opponent	Result	2008–09 Coupe de la Ligue	Opponent	Result
Bye		First round	Dijon (H)	3–0
Bye		Second round	Amiens (H)	3–2
Bye		Third round	Valenciennes (H)	3–3 (a.e.t.) (5–4 p)
Guingamp (H)	4–2	Round of 16	Auxerre (H)	2–0
Châteauroux (H)	2–1	Quarter-finals	Metz (H)	1–1 (a.e.t.) (4–3 p)
Paris Saint-Germain (A)	3–0	Semi-finals	Nice (A)	1–1 (a.e.t.) (4–3 p)

== Final summary ==
25 April 2009
20:50 CET

Bordeaux	4–0	Vannes
Wendel 2'; Planus 10'; Gouffran 12'; Gourcuff 40'	Report

Stade de France, Saint-Denis
Attendance: 75,000
Referee: Fredy Fautrel

Bordeaux	Vannes

Bordeaux:
GK	30	(France) Mathieu Valverde
RB	6	(France) Franck Jurietti (c)
CB	13	(Argentina) Diego Placente
CB	15	(Senegal) Souleymane Diawara
LB	27	(France) Marc Planus
RM	7	(France) Yoan Gouffran
CM	5	(Brazil) Fernando Menegazzo
CM	24	(Mali) Abdou Traoré
LM	17	(Brazil) Wendel	(substituted off) 18'
AM	8	(France) Yoann Gourcuff
FW	29	(Morocco) Marouane Chamakh	(substituted off) 61'
Substitutes:
GK	16	(France) Ulrich Ramé
DF	28	(France) Benoît Trémoulinas	(substituted on) 18'	(substituted off) 46'
DF	21	(France) Mathieu Chalmé
MF	19	(France) Pierre Ducasse	(substituted on) 46'
MF	33	(France) Grégory Sertic
FW	11	(France) David Bellion	(substituted on) 61'
FW	25	(France) Henri Saivet
Manager:
(France) Laurent Blanc

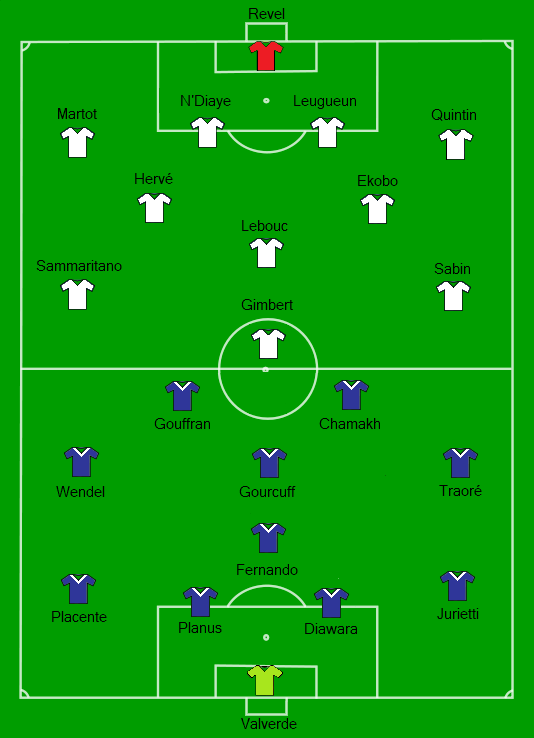

Vannes:
GK	1	(France) Christophe Revel
RB	6	(Cameroon) Patrick Leugueun (c)
CB	19	(Cameroon) Eugène Ekobo		(substituted off) 74'
CB	26	(France) Oumar N'Diaye		(substituted off) 84'
LB	5	(France) Laurent Hervé
CM	23	(France) David Martot
CM	10	(France) Jérôme Lebouc		(substituted off) 62'
CM	20	(France) Erwan Quintin	(yellow card) 37'
FW	28	(France) Ghislain Gimbert	(yellow card) 21'
FW	11	(France) Frédéric Sammaritano
FW	13	(France) Cédric Sabin	(yellow card) 34'
Substitutes:
GK	30	(France) Benoît Costil
DF	4	(France) Pierre Talmont		(substituted on) 84'
MF	7	(France) Nicolas Savinaud
MF	18	(France) Nicolas Diguiny
MF	21	(France) Ulrick Chavas
MF	27	(France) Stéphane Auvray		(substituted on) 74'
FW	22	(France) Seïd Khiter		(substituted on) 62'
Manager:
(France) Stéphane Le Mignan

Assistant referees:
(France) Cyril Gringore
(France) Eric Guerin
Fourth official:
(France) Antony Gautier

== See also ==
- 2009 Coupe de France final
- 2008–09 FC Girondins de Bordeaux season
