= Stéphane Le Mignan =

French footballer (born 1974)

Personal information
- Date of birth: 4 June 1974 (age 52)
- Place of birth: Auray, France
- Height: 1.83 m (6 ft 0 in)
- Position: Midfielder

Senior career*
Years	Team	Apps	(Gls)
1993–1994	Montagnarde		
1994–1996	Pontivy		
1996–2000	Locminé		
2000–2001	Vannes	1	(0)

Managerial career
- 2002–2012: Vannes
- 2013–2016: Boulogne
- 2017: Créteil
- 2018–2019: Al-Gharafa (assistant)
- 2020–2024: Concarneau
- 2024–2026: Metz
- * Club domestic league appearances and goals

Stéphane Le Mignan (born 4 June 1974) is a French football coach and a former player. He was most recently the manager of Ligue 1 side Metz.

A midfielder, he played in lower leagues. He began managing at Vannes in 2002, winning the Championnat National in 2008 and finishing runners-up in the Coupe de la Ligue in 2009. He also won the Championnat National with Concarneau in 2023.

== Career ==
=== Vannes ===
Le Mignan spent his entire playing career in the French lower leagues with Montagnarde, Pontivy, Locminé and Vannes. In November 2002, after dismissing Denis Goavec, Vannes hired recently retired Le Mignan as manager. The team achieved promotion from the fourth-tier Championnat de France Amateur to the Championnat National under him in 2005.

In the 2006–07 Coupe de France, Vannes won 2–0 after extra time in the last 16 away to Ligue 2 team Montpellier, then lost 5–0 at Ligue 1 Marseille in the quarter-finals. Vannes won the 2007–08 Championnat National to earn promotion to Ligue 2 for the first time. This also meant a debut campaign in the Coupe de la Ligue, beating top-flight Valenciennes, Auxerre and Nice before a 4–0 final loss to Bordeaux at the Stade de France.

In the 2010–11 Ligue 2, the team were relegated in 18th place on the final day, and the budget for the following season was thereby reduced from €8.5 million to €4 million, resulting in 14 players being released. On 27 December 2012, after over a decade in charge, Le Mignan was dismissed with the team 7th in the third tier, six points off Poiré-sur-Vie in third.

=== Boulogne ===
In June 2013, Le Mignan was hired by third-tier Boulogne. On his debut on 6 August, the team lost on penalties at home to Créteil in the first round of the Coupe de la Ligue.

Le Mignan led his team to the quarter-finals of the Coupe de France in 2014–15, beating second-tier opposition Le Havre in the eighth round and Quevilly in the last 16. On 3 March 2015, the team were eliminated on penalties at their Stade de la Libération by top-flight Saint-Étienne.

Le Mignan was dismissed on 21 February 2016, with the club in tenth place and two points above the relegation zone.

=== Créteil ===
On 9 January 2017, Le Mignan was hired at Créteil, ranked 14th in the third tier. On his debut four days later, the team won 2–1 at home to Consolat Marseille. He was dismissed on 21 November, with the team in the same place as when he took them over.

In June 2018, Le Mignan had the first foreign experience of his career, being chosen as assistant for a year at Al-Gharafa in the Qatar Stars League, under fellow Breton Christian Gourcuff.

=== Concarneau ===
On 14 March 2020, Le Mignan returned to France's third tier, being named manager at eleventh-placed Concarneau in his native region. As the season was annulled due to the COVID-19 pandemic, he did not debut until 21 August, when his team began the new campaign with a 2–0 win at Avranches. In May 2022, he extended his contract for three more years.

Le Mignan took on his former club Vannes on 29 October 2022 in the seventh round of the Coupe de France, losing on penalties. The following 26 May, with a 2–1 final day win at Orléans, the team won the league title ahead of Dunkerque to play in Ligue 2 for the first time in their history.

== Career statistics ==
As of match played 20 January 2026

Managerial record by team and tenure
Team	From	To	Record						
Team	From	To	P	W	D	L	GF	GA	Win %
Vannes	1 November 2002	27 December 2012	314	123	83	108	407	425	39.17
Boulogne	17 June 2003	21 February 2016	104	42	24	38	164	138	40.38
Créteil-Lusitanos	9 January 2017	22 November 2017	32	12	3	17	40	50	37.50
Concarneau	14 March 2020	24 May 2024	147	58	42	47	213	183	39.46
Metz	4 July 2024	20 January 2026	60	26	15	19	95	83	43.33
Career total			657	261	167	229	919	879	39.73

== Honours ==
Vannes

- Championnat National: 2007–08

Concarneau

- Championnat National: 2022–23
