= Benoît Trémoulinas =

French association football player (born 1985)

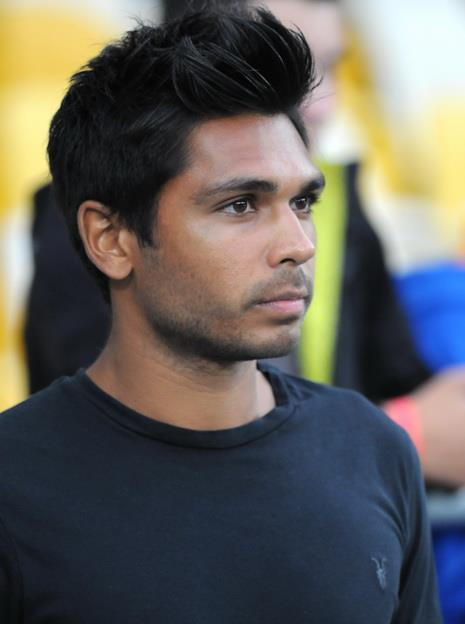
- Trémoulinas in 2013

Personal information
- Full name: Benoît Trémoulinas
- Date of birth: 28 December 1985 (age 40)
- Place of birth: Bordeaux, France
- Height: 1.72 m (5 ft 8 in)
- Position: Left-back

Team information
- Current team: Bordeaux

Youth career
- 1993–1994: US Lormont
- 1994–2007: Bordeaux

Senior career*
Years	Team	Apps	(Gls)
2007–2013	Bordeaux	164	(5)
2013–2014	Dynamo Kyiv	10	(0)
2014	→ Saint-Étienne (loan)	12	(0)
2014–2017	Sevilla	44	(0)
2026–	Bordeaux	0	(0)

International career
2012–2015	France	5	(0)
- * Club domestic league appearances and goals

Benoît Trémoulinas (born 28 December 1985) is a French professional footballer who plays as a left-back for Régional 1 club Bordeaux.

Trémoulinas began his career at Bordeaux, making 200 appearances across all competitions and winning five pieces of silverware from all four domestic honours. He also played abroad with Dynamo Kyiv and Sevilla, winning the UEFA Europa League with the latter.

== Club career ==
=== Bordeaux ===
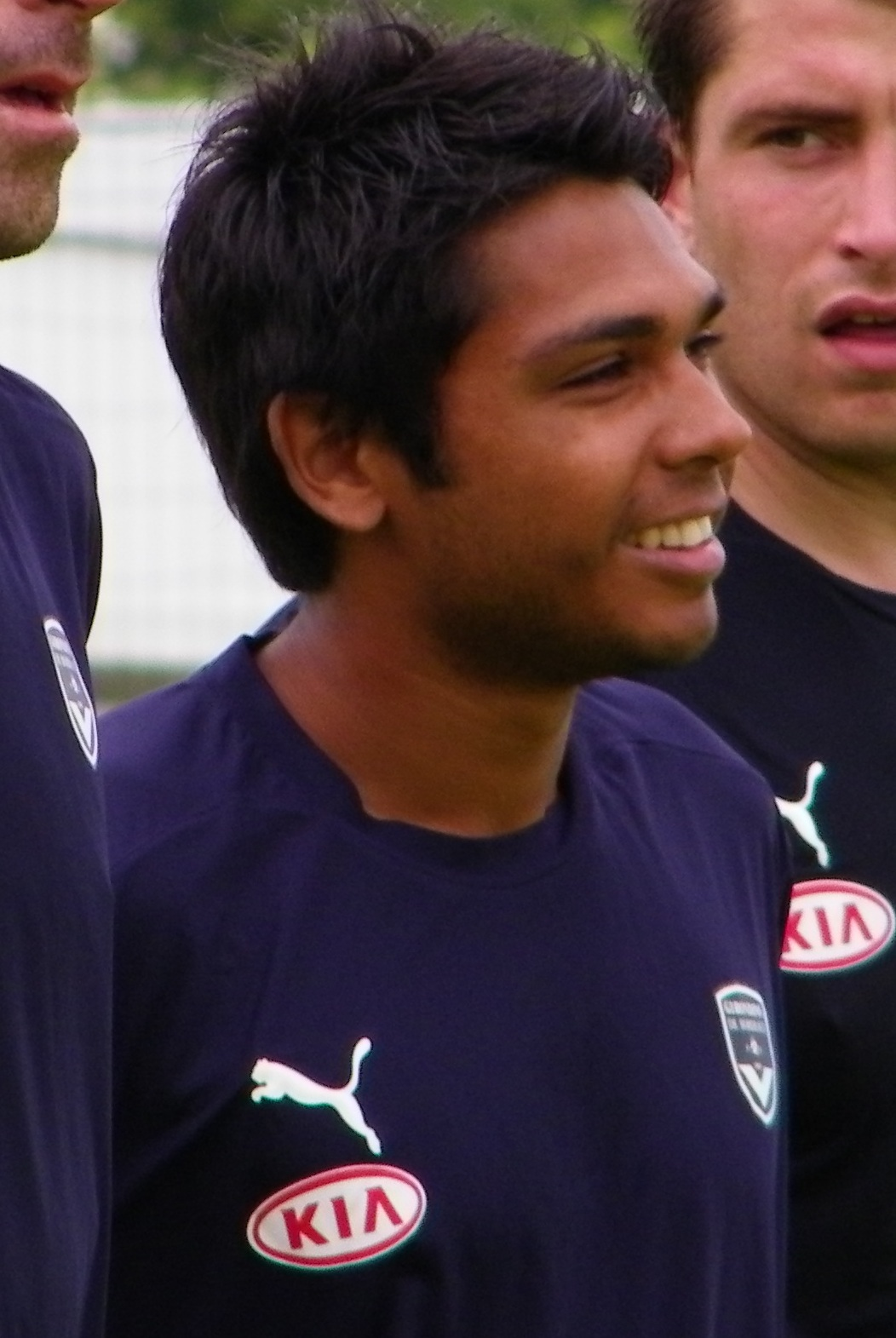
Trémoulinas with Bordeaux in 2009

Trémoulinas was born in the Bordeaux, Gironde, and began his career playing with US Lormont. In 1994, he signed a youth contract with Bordeaux, spending approximately seven years in the club's youth system and one year in the Championnat de France Amateur before earning a call up to the senior team in preparation for the 2007–08 season following the signing of his professional contract.

Trémoulinas received the number 28 shirt and served as backup to the younger Florian Marange and elder Franck Jurietti. He made his professional debut on 15 August 2007 in a league match against Le Mans, and was limited to only nine league appearances, but was a regular in the club's 2007–08 UEFA Cup campaign appearing in seven matches and also scoring his first European goal in a 3–2 victory over Greek club Panionios.

Trémoulinas was slowly integrated into the squad for the 2008–09 season by manager Laurent Blanc, overtaking both Marange and Jurietti (though the latter was still relied more upon in important matches, such as when he started for Trémoulinas in matches against Paris Saint-Germain, Lyon, and the 2009 Coupe de la Ligue Final). He did appear in the final as a substitute in the 17th minute for the injured Brazilian Wendel, but had to substitute out at halftime, also due to injury. Bordeaux won the match 4–0 giving Trech, as he is called by the Bordeaux faithful, his first career club honour.

Following the final, Trémoulinas started the final five matches of the season, helping Bordeaux win their first league title since 1999. In total with the team, he appeared in 31 matches scoring his only goal of the season against Guingamp in a 4–2 victory in the Coupe de la Ligue. On 29 May 2009, he signed a contract extension until June 2013.

Trémoulinas appeared regularly during the 2009–10 season, and attracted interest from Italian clubs AC Milan, Juventus and Fiorentina, and Spanish club Real Madrid, quickly denying all rumours. He was among the top assists providers in the league, primarily due to his crosses and ability to get forward.

=== Abroad ===
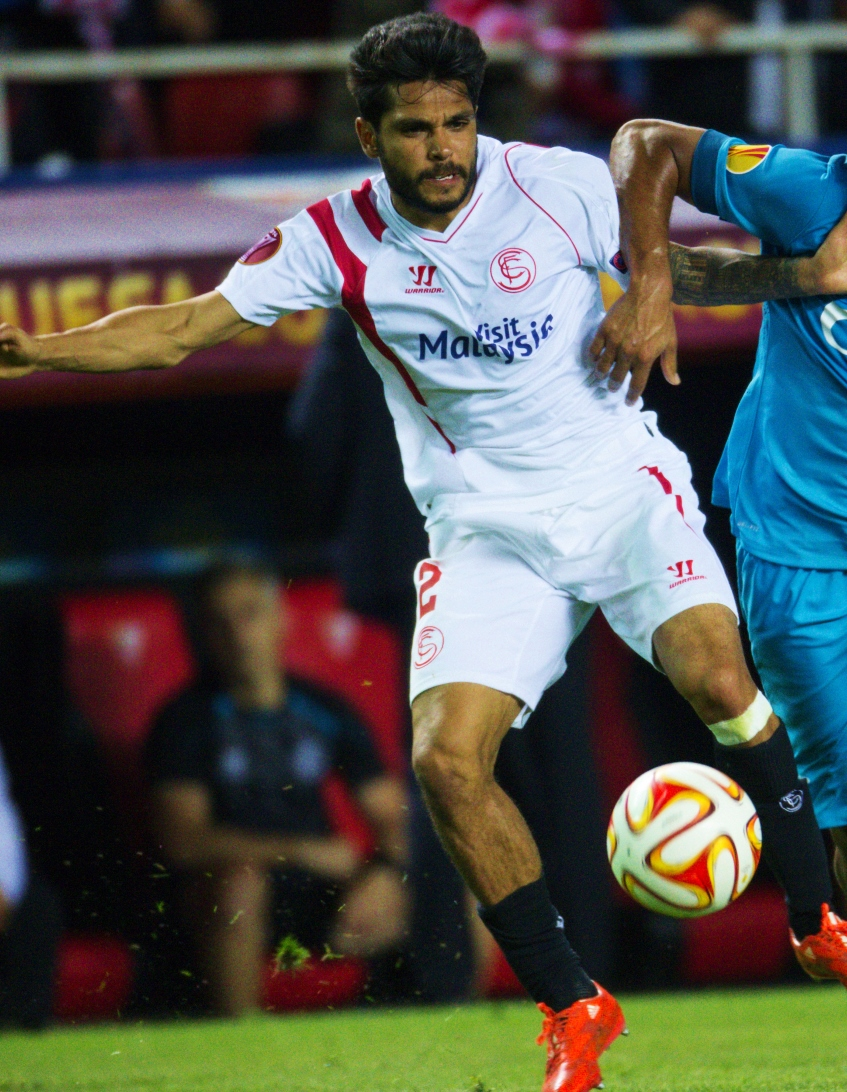
Trémoulinas playing for Sevilla in 2015

On 12 July 2013, Trémoulinas signed a four-year contract with the Ukrainian club Dynamo Kyiv. He made his debut for the club sixteen days later in a 2–0 win against Sevastopol, spending 70 minutes on the pitch and also setting up one of the goals.

On 31 January 2014, Trémoulinas was loaned out to Saint-Étienne until the end of the season, after falling down the pecking order while at Dynamo. On 8 July 2014, he returned to his parent club, after appearing in 12 matches.

On 24 August 2014, Trémoulinas signed a three-year contract with La Liga club Sevilla, initially as a replacement for Liverpool-bound Alberto Moreno. He made ten appearances as they won the UEFA Europa League in his first season, including the 3–2 win over Dnipro in the final in Warsaw. In May 2017, Trémoulinas announced he would leave the club upon the expiry of his contract.

On 14 February 2019, Trémoulinas announced his retirement as a professional player after struggling with knee injuries.

== International career ==
Trémoulinas was born in France and is of Indo-Reunnionais, and Malagasy descent. On 5 August 2010, Trémoulinas was called up to the senior team for the first time by new manager Laurent Blanc for the team's friendly against Norway on 11 August 2010. However, he did not play that game but he was called up again more than two years after by Didier Deschamps for a friendly game against Italy scheduled on 15 November 2012 in which he replaced Moussa Sissoko at the 89th minute of the game achieving his first international selection.

== Career statistics ==
=== Club ===
Appearances and goals by club, season and competition
Club	Season	League		Cup (Note: Includes Coupe de France, Coupe de la Ligue, Trophée des Champions)		Europe (Note: Includes UEFA Super Cup)		Total	
Club	Season	Apps	Goals	Apps	Goals	Apps	Goals	Apps	Goals
Bordeaux	2007–08	9	0	4	0	7	1	20	1
Bordeaux	2008–09	26	0	4	1	1	0	31	1
Bordeaux	2009–10	34	2	5	0	9	0	48	2
Bordeaux	2010–11	31	0	3	0	0	0	34	0
Bordeaux	2011–12	36	2	4	0	0	0	40	2
Bordeaux	2012–13	28	1	6	1	6	0	34	1
Bordeaux	Total	164	5	26	2	23	1	213	8
Dynamo Kyiv	2013–14	7	0	1	0	6	0	14	0
Dynamo Kyiv	2014–15	3	0	0	0	0	0	3	0
Dynamo Kyiv	Total	10	0	1	0	6	0	17	0
Saint-Étienne (loan)	2013–14	12	0	0	0	0	0	12	0
Sevilla	2014–15	20	0	0	0	10	0	30	0
Sevilla	2015–16	24	0	3	0	10	1	37	1
Sevilla	2016–17	0	0	0	0	0	0	0	0
Sevilla	Total	44	0	3	0	20	1	67	1
Career total		230	5	30	2	49	2	309	9

=== International ===
Appearances and goals by national team and year
National team	Year	Apps	Goals
France	2012	1	0
France	2013	1	0
France	2015	3	0
Total		5	0

== Honours ==
Bordeaux

- Ligue 1: 2008–09
- Coupe de France: 2012–13
- Coupe de la Ligue: 2008–09
- Trophée des Champions: 2008, 2009

Dynamo Kyiv

- Ukrainian Premier League: 2014–15
- Ukrainian Cup: 2013–14

Sevilla

- UEFA Europa League: 2014–15, 2015–16

Individual

- Ligue 1 Team of the Year: 2009–10
