= Yoann Gourcuff =

French footballer (born 1986)

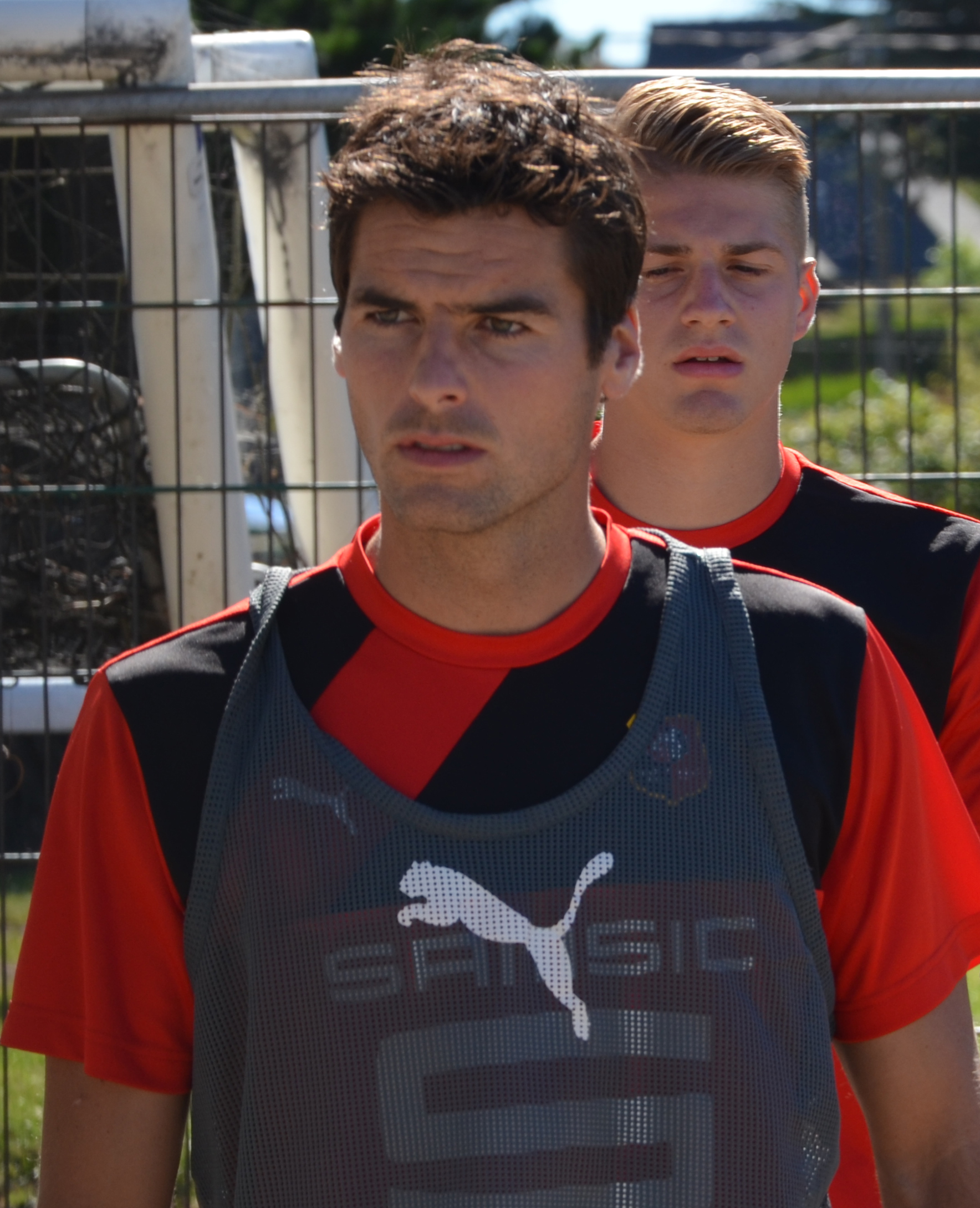
- Gourcuff with Rennes in 2016

Personal information
- Full name: Yoann Miguel Gourcuff
- Date of birth: 11 July 1986 (age 40)
- Place of birth: Ploemeur, France
- Height: 1.86 m (6 ft 1 in)
- Position: Attacking midfielder

Youth career
- 1992–2001: Lorient
- 2001–2003: Rennes

Senior career*
Years	Team	Apps	(Gls)
2003–2006	Rennes	66	(6)
2006–2009	AC Milan	36	(2)
2008–2009	→ Bordeaux (loan)	37	(12)
2009–2010	Bordeaux	32	(6)
2010–2015	Lyon	90	(14)
2015–2018	Rennes	49	(7)
2018–2019	Dijon	8	(0)
Total		318	(47)

International career
2004–2005	France U19	17	(7)
2006–2008	France U21	18	(4)
2008–2013	France	31	(4)
- * Club domestic league appearances and goals

Yoann Miguel Gourcuff (born 11 July 1986) is a French former professional footballer who played mainly as an attacking midfielder. He could also be utilized as a withdrawn striker; he was described as a "playmaker of real quality", "an accomplished passer of the ball". He was widely characterized as one of the most promising French youth talents of his generation. His talent, playing style, tenacity on the pitch, technical skills, as well as precocious ability drew comparisons to Zinedine Zidane.

Yoann Gourcuff is the son of Christian Gourcuff. In 2001, he followed in his father's footsteps and joined Rennes. After progressing through the youth ranks and making the senior team, Gourcuff quickly became a fan favorite among supporters and his individual achievements soon led to interest from clubs abroad, which resulted in a move to Italian club AC Milan. He achieved many club honours despite not being able to break into the starting eleven, which resulted in the player being sent on loan to Ligue 1 club Bordeaux. Following a successful season, in which Bordeaux captured the league and league cup double and Gourcuff attained several individual honours, he signed with the club permanently. Gourcuff was named Ligue 1 Player of the Year 2008–09 and the French Player of the Year for the 2009 calendar year.

In August 2010, he joined Lyon on a five-year contract. His five years at Lyon were characterized by persistent injury problems. He returned to his former club Rennes in 2015, where he would play for three seasons before signing for Dijon, the final club of his career. Having terminated his contract in January 2019, Gourcuff's retirement was confirmed by his father in October 2020.

Gourcuff was a French international, winning 31 caps. Prior to playing at senior level, he played on the under-19 team that won the 2005 UEFA European Under-19 Championship. Gourcuff made his senior national team debut in August 2008. He scored his first international goal two months later against Romania. Gourcuff made his first major tournament appearance for France at the 2010 FIFA World Cup. After joining the national team, he was inserted into the playmaker role, a position that was vacated and never filled following the retirement of Zidane in 2006.

== Early and personal life ==
Gourcuff was born in Ploemeur, Brittany to parents Dr. Marine Thalouarn and Christian Gourcuff, both of whom are Bretons. He comes from a very athletic family: his mother was a basketball player, his older brother, Erwan, is a competitive swimmer and cyclist, while his father was a former footballer who played for several clubs in such countries as France, Switzerland, and Canada. However, his father was best known for his time at Rennes, Lorient, and Le Mans. Gourcuff's father later moved into managerial roles, having stints at Rennes, Le Mans, Lorient (three times), and Qatari club Al-Gharafa. As a youth, the younger Gourcuff excelled at both football and tennis, becoming the top player of his age group (12), but eventually opted to focus on football. While beginning his career as a football player, Gourcuff admired and drew inspiration from the playing style of the Brazil national team from the 1970s, whom he discovered from watching tapes with his father. He often attempted to emulate the skills of Brazilian legend Pelé.

== Club career ==
=== Early career and Rennes ===
Gourcuff began his career with Lorient, who were, at the time, managed by his father Christian in 1992. During his time at Lorient, he also trained at PEF Ploufragan, a regional academy located in the Brittany region that trained players similarly to the Clairefontaine academy in the Île-de-France. Further to his father's departure to Rennes, Gourcuff, who initially considered rivals Nantes, followed suit and signed an aspirant (youth) contract with the club in 2001. He spent two years in the club's youth academy and, while competing domestically in the system, Gourcuff played on the club's under-19 team that won the 2003 edition of the Coupe Gambardella. Rennes defeated Strasbourg 4–1 in the final match at the Stade de France. Gourcuff scored the club's opening goal. Included on that team with Gourcuff were future club and international teammates Jimmy Briand and Sylvain Marveaux.

Ahead of the 2003–04 season. Gourcuff was promoted to the club's reserve team in the Championnat de France amateur, the fourth level of French football, Gourcuff appeared in 15 matches and scored two goals with the team before signing his first professional contract in November 2003, which resulted in his promotion to the senior team by manager Laszlo Bölöni. Gourcuff made his professional debut on 25 January 2004 in a 2–0 victory to Croix-de-Savoie in the Coupe de France appearing as a substitute. On 7 February, he made his league debut in a 2–0 defeat to Auxerre appearing as a substitute. Following the match, he was relegated back to the reserve team. Gourcuff returned to the senior team in late March making two more substitute appearances against Strasbourg and Lille. On 18 April, he made his first professional start in a 3–1 win over Bordeaux. Gourcuff made his second career start on the final match day of the season assisting on a goal in a 4–0 victory over Montpellier.

For the second consecutive season under Bölöni, Gourcuff rotated between the club's reserve team and the senior team. He appeared in nine matches with the reserve team and 21 with the senior team. Gourcuff only started six matches with the latter team scoring no goals and providing one assist. In the 2005–06 season, he was reassigned the number 10 shirt by Bölöni and giving a starting place within the team. In his first season as a starter, Gourcuff appeared in 42 total matches and scored six goals. He formed midfield partnerships with fellow Frenchman Olivier Monterrubio and the Swede Kim Källström and made his European debut on 15 September in a UEFA Cup first round tie against Spanish club Osasuna appearing as a substitute. Rennes won the tie 3–1 on aggregate and were later eliminated in the group stage portion of the competition. Three days after his European debut, on 18 September, Gourcuff scored his first professional goal against Monaco in a 2–0 win. In November, Gourcuff scored goals in back-to-back matches against Troyes and Toulouse. In the latter part of the season, Gourcuff went on a scoring run netting three goals in a span of four weeks. He scored the first of these goals on 25 February 2006 in a 4–1 away win over Lyon. After going a week without a goal, Gourcuff responded by scoring goals in back-to-back weeks in wins over Ajaccio and Metz. In the Coupe de France, Gourcuff appeared in all four of the team's matches as Rennes reached the semi-finals where the club was defeated 3–0 by Marseille. Rennes ultimately finished the season in 7th place in the league, which resulted in the club qualifying for the 2006 UEFA Intertoto Cup. Gourcuff finished his Rennes career with 80 appearances, six goals, and nine assists.

=== AC Milan ===
Following the season, Gourcuff was linked to a host of big name European clubs such as Dutch club Ajax, Spanish club Valencia, and English club Arsenal. He ultimately joined Italian club AC Milan. He signed a five-year contract with the transfer fee being priced at €4.58 million. Gourcuff was assigned the number 20 shirt and made his competitive debut for the Rossoneri on 9 August 2006 in the club's UEFA Champions League third qualifying round tie against Serbian club Red Star Belgrade. He appeared as a substitute in the 81st minute for Andrea Pirlo as Milan won the match 1–0. In his next competitive match with the club against Greek outfit AEK Athens in the Champions League group stage, Gourcuff scored his first career goal for the club in a 3–0 win. Gourcuff didn't make his Serie A debut until 20 September playing the entire match in a 1–0 win over Ascoli. In the ensuing matches, Gourcuff rotated between the starting lineup and the bench and capped the season by scoring in Milan's final match of the Seria A season; a 3–2 defeat to Udinese. Despite not appearing in the 2007 UEFA Champions League Final, which Milan won, Gourcuff did earn a winner's medal with the club as a result of his participation in the group stage and knockout round matches.

Due to Milan winning the UEFA Champions League, Gourcuff was included in the squads that competed in the 2007 UEFA Super Cup and the 2007 FIFA Club World Cup, though he didn't appear in the former match and appeared infrequently in the latter competition. In the 2007–08 Serie A season, Gourcuff struggled for playing time as he was in direct competition with the Brazilian international and 2007 FIFA World Player of the Year winner Kaká. Gourcuff's development and attitude at the club was also questioned by manager Carlo Ancelotti who critically stated that the player had psychological issues. Gourcuff only appeared in 15 league matches for the club starting only four. He scored his only goal of the season on 31 October 2007 in a 5–0 hammering of Sampdoria. On 24 February 2008, after appearing as a half-time substitute, Gourcuff assisted on the game-winning goal scored in the 90th minute by Filippo Inzaghi in Milan's 2–1 win over Palermo. In the final nine matches of the season, Gourcuff was an unused substitute in seven of them. In Gourcuff's final match at the club, he assisted on the final goal by Alexandre Pato in the club 5–1 win over Reggina.

"Gourcuff in Milan was 100% wrong. His problem here was his behavior. He was not intelligent in the manner of managing himself. When he played here, he did not want to make himself available to the group. He did not start to study Italian immediately."

— Former AC Milan captain Paolo Maldini reflecting back on Gourcuff's stint at Milan.

Following the season, on 31 May 2008, Milan vice-president Adriano Galliani revealed that the club would loan Gourcuff to French club Bordeaux for the entire 2008–09 season to allow him more playing time. In 2010, in an interview with French newspaper L'Equipe, former Milan captain Paolo Maldini stated that Gourcuff lacked discipline while at the club and often distanced himself from the team citing the player's refusal to learn the Italian language. Maldini also stated that Gourcuff did not give his all during his stint at Milan and that the player himself knew it. Gourcuff did not respond to the comments, but his father Christian did, stating to France Football that there was some sort of conspiracy out there looking to tarnish his son's image. The elder Gourcuff responded to Maldini's charges stating his son "took two hours (of Italian language courses) per day and spoke Italian after two months" and that "he is passionate about tactics" in response to Maldini saying Gourcuff refused to learn Italian and he was limited tactically. Gourcuff was also defended by his club president Jean-Louis Triaud at his former club Bordeaux who stated in response to Maldini's comments "Yoann is not like that. A number ten who does not play with the group is a little weird. This does not correspond at all to what we saw with Yoann at Bordeaux. He was well integrated with his teammates, and collectively with them on the ground. He left good memories here."

=== Bordeaux ===
"That goal was no accident." "It showed there was something magical about him. I felt ill when Zidane retired. Watching Gourcuff has cured me. When I see players like him, I feel like a small boy again."

— Christophe Dugarry, on Gourcuff's goal against PSG.

At Bordeaux, Gourcuff quickly asserted himself into the squad for the 2008–09 season scoring on his league debut against Caen in a 2–1 victory and also helping Bordeaux capture their 2nd Trophée des champions title. He scored Bordeaux's 4th and final goal in the team's 4–0 triumph over Vannes in the Coupe de la Ligue final. Gourcuff also provided the assist on the third goal. He scored two goals in Bordeaux's Champions League campaign against Roma and CFR Cluj. On 11 January 2009, Gourcuff scored a goal that was voted the goal of the season by fans against Paris Saint-Germain in a 4–0 victory. Upon receiving the ball from teammate Matthieu Chalmé, just outside the box, Gourcuff performed a swift Marseille turn, eluding PSG defender Sylvain Armand, followed by an elastico that caused Sammy Traoré to lose balance, before bringing the ball back to his right foot and blasting it past Paris Saint-Germain goalkeeper Mickaël Landreau with the outside of his right foot.

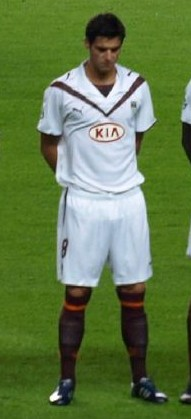
Gourcuff in 2008

The following two weeks, Gourcuff scored his fifth and sixth goals, respectively, against Nantes in a 2–1 victory and Lille in a 2–2 draw. After going goalless in the league for seven straight weeks, Gourcuff got back on track scoring against relegation-bound Le Havre. On 20 April 2009, Gourcuff scored his first career double against his former club Rennes in a 3–2 victory. In the ensuing three weeks, Gourcuff maintained his form scoring in all three matches, against Sochaux, Valenciennes, and Le Mans giving him a tally of 12 league goals for the season. Bordeaux won all three matches, which effectively put them in first-place position heading into the final week of the season. Bordeaux eventually won the league capturing the sixth title in the club's history. The club also recorded its second ever double, as a result of its Coupe de la Ligue title. For his efforts during the 2008–09 season, Gourcuff was awarded the UNFP Ligue 1 Player of the Year award. He was also named in the organization's Ligue 1 Team of the Year. His performances during the 2008–09 season later earned him a nomination by the French magazine France Football for the 2009 Ballon d'Or award, won by Lionel Messi as Gourcuff finished in 20th place with six points.

Due to Gourcuff's impressive season, his parent club announced that it would be open to the player returning to Milan for the 2009–10 season. However, the club's plans were put on halt after learning of Bordeaux's intent to meet Gourcuff's buy-out clause of €15 million included in the loan deal. Despite general manager Adriano Galliani and new manager Leonardo's efforts to persuade Gourcuff to return, on 28 May, it was announced that Bordeaux had signed Gourcuff permanently from Milan with Gourcuff agreeing to a four-year deal. The transfer fee was €13.6 million.

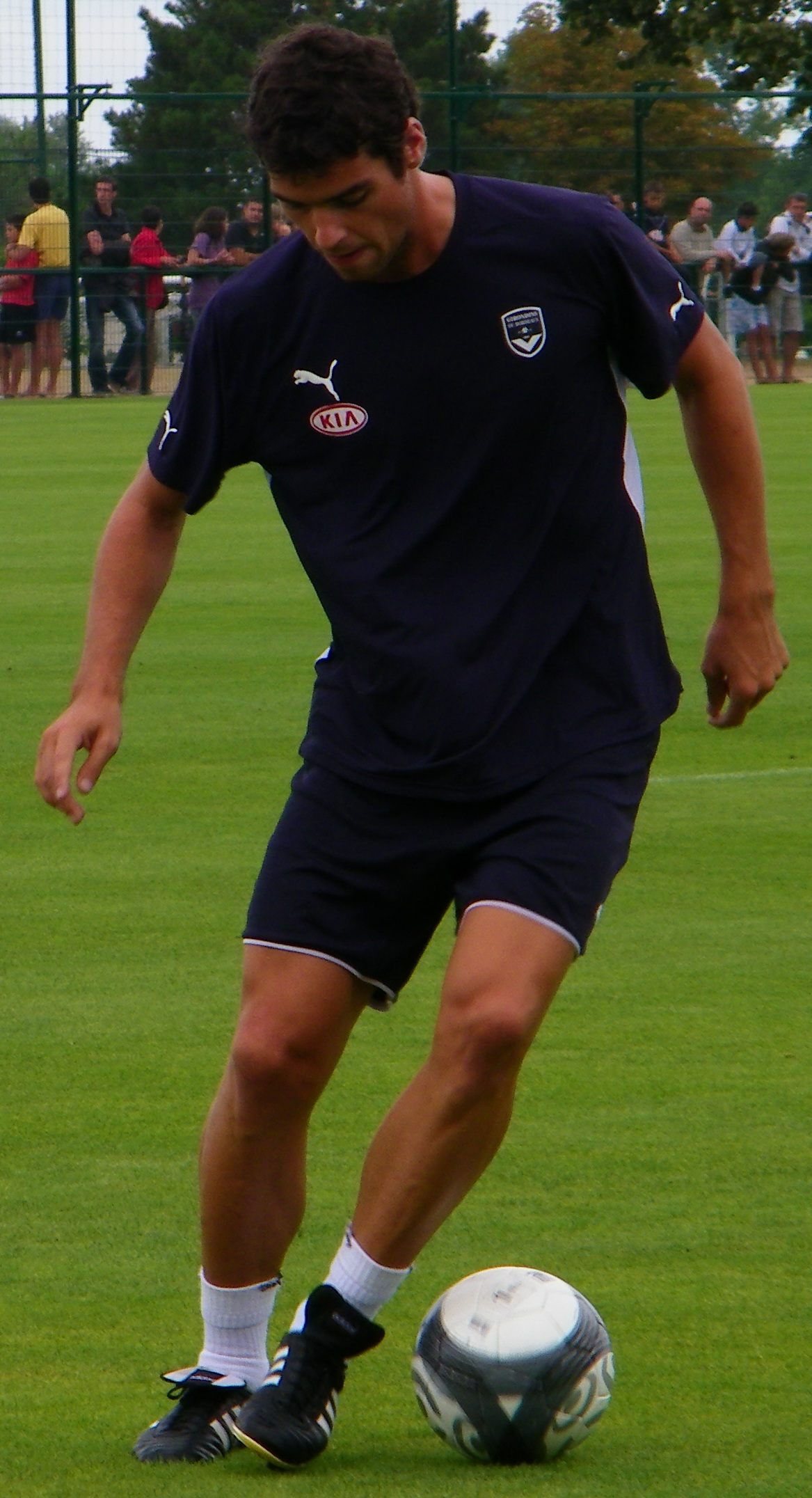
Gourcuff during an August 2009 training session

Gourcuff began the 2009–10 season claiming his fourth silverware with Bordeaux on 25 July 2009, winning the 2009 Trophée des Champions title in a 2–0 victory over Guingamp. As a result of his performance, he was named Man of the Match. Two weeks later, he scored a double in the club's opening match of the league season against Lens. The final result was 4–1. The victory set a record in league play for most consecutive wins for the club with 12. On 23 August, he scored another set of goals, this time against Nice in a 4–0 victory.

In the UEFA Champions League, Gourcuff assisted on Bordeaux's only goal in the club's opening 1–1 draw against Italian club Juventus scored by Jaroslav Plašil. On 30 September, Gourcuff suffered a groin injury in the club's 1–0 victory over Israeli club Maccabi Haifa, which forced him to miss two league matches and an international call up. Bordeaux lost both matches. He returned to the team for Bordeaux's back-to-back matches with German club Bayern Munich. In the first match, which Bordeaux won 2–1, Gourcuff missed a penalty after attempting to cheekily chip the ball over goalkeeper Hans-Jörg Butt, however in the second match, he made amends scoring the game-winning goal in Bordeaux's 2–0 victory at the Allianz Arena. Bordeaux eventually finished the group stage portion undefeated.

For most of November and the early part of December, Gourcuff suffered a dip in form in league play going scoreless and also not providing any assists. Manager Laurent Blanc later stated that Gourcuff had lacked confidence since returning from his injury following Gourcuff's second penalty miss of the season in the club's midweek 1–0 victory over Montpellier on 16 November. However, three days later, Gourcuff returned to form scoring a goal and providing the assists on the other three goals in Bordeaux's 4–1 win over Lorient. On 20 December, he was declared by magazine France Football the French Player of the Year for 2009 beating out the likes of Nicolas Anelka, Hugo Lloris, Thierry Henry, and Franck Ribéry; the latter having won the award the past two seasons prior.

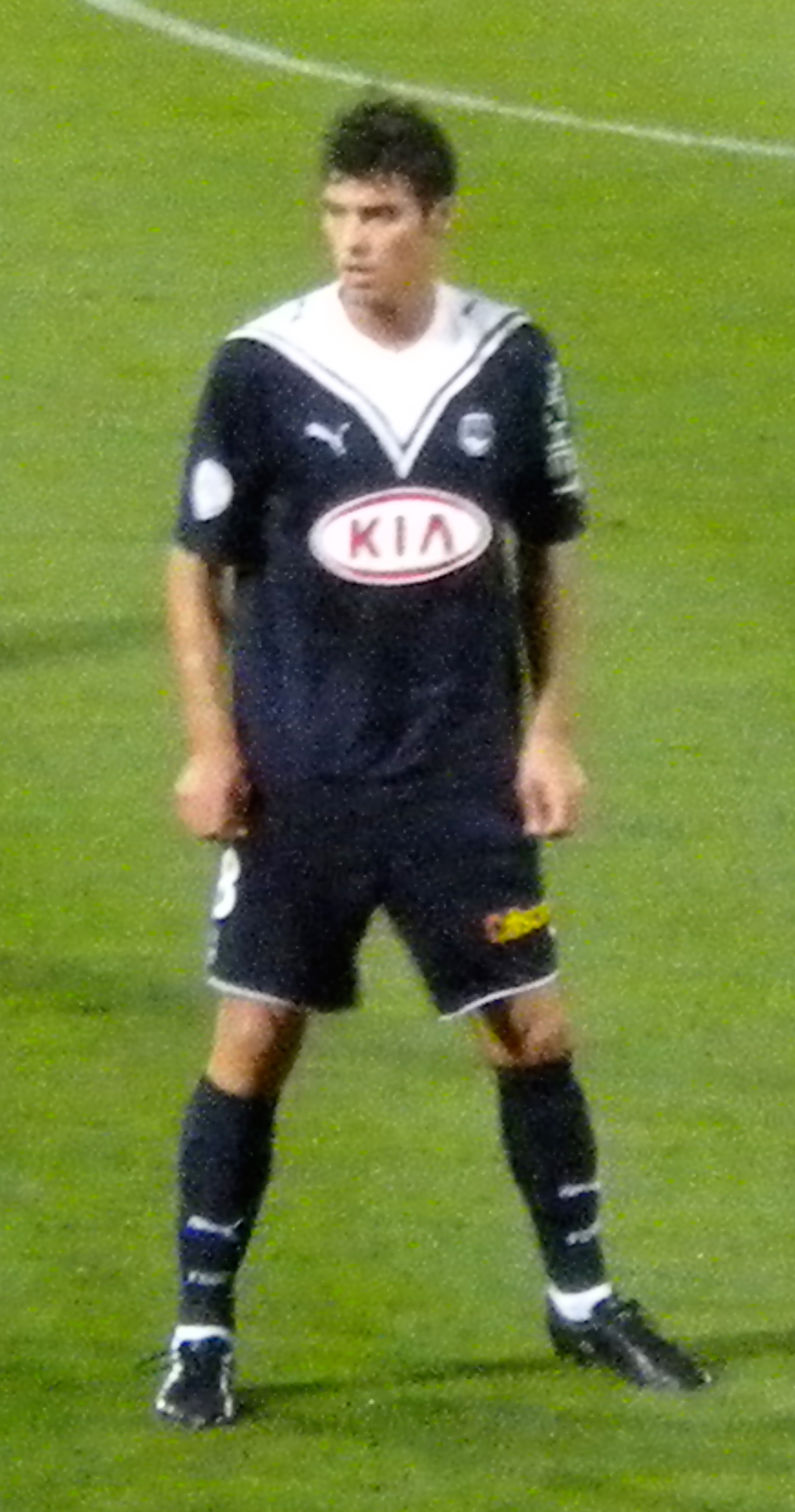
Gourcuff during the 2009–10 season.

On 23 February 2010, Gourcuff assisted on Bordeaux's only goal, scored by Michaël Ciani, in the club's shutout victory away to Greek club Olympiacos in the first leg of its UEFA Champions League knockout round match following his delivery of a powerful and driven free kick into the box that landed at the head of the defenseman. In the second leg, he scored the opening goal in the 5th minute converting a free kick to put Bordeaux up 2–0 on aggregate. The team won the tie with a 3–1 aggregate scoreline to advance to the quarter-finals where Bordeaux faced league rivals Lyon. In the first leg, which Lyon won 3–1, Gourcuff provided the assist on an away goal scored by Marouane Chamakh. In the second leg, Bordeaux recorded a first half goal, but were unable to score another as Lyon advanced to the semi-finals on a 3–2 aggregate scoreline. On 24 April in a league match against Lorient, Gourcuff endured a recurring groin injury during the early stages of the match. Despite showing signs of injury, Gourcuff remained in the match until the end of the first half. Due to the injury, Gourcuff missed the Bordeaux's final five league matches. The club recorded two wins, one draw, and two losses in the five matches which resulted in Bordeaux failing to qualify for European competition next season.

In the 2010–11 season, Gourcuff appeared in Bordeaux's first three league matches of the season. On 22 August 2010, French media reported that, on the eve of the team's match against Paris Saint-Germain, the midfielder had informed Bordeaux officials of his intent to join Lyon. Gourcuff was, subsequently, relegated to the bench for the match. In his final match with the club, he appeared as a substitute and assisted on the game-winning goal scored by Ciani in injury time.

=== Lyon ===
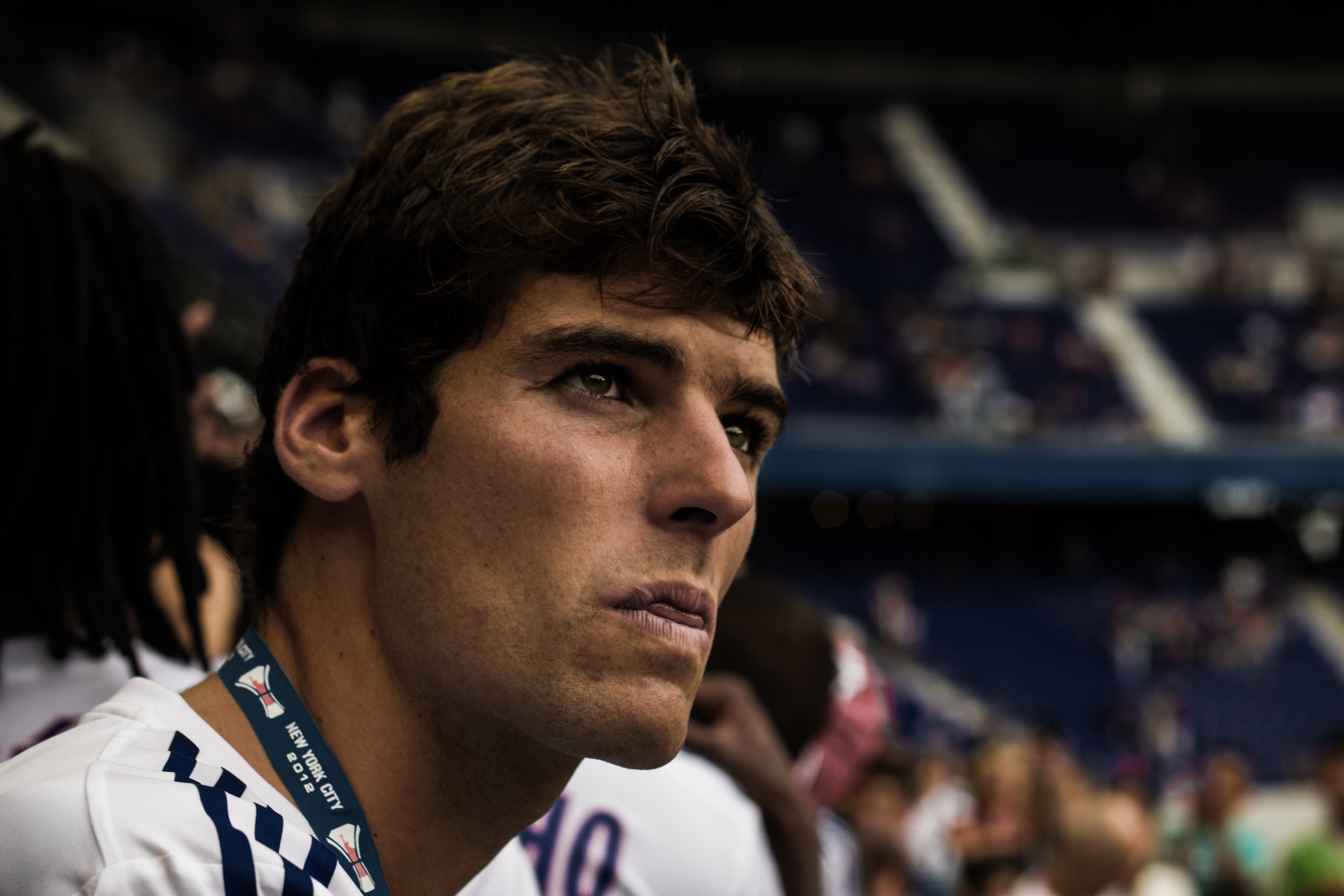
Gourcuff with Lyon in 2012

On 23 August 2010, Lyon confirmed on its website that the club had reached an agreement with Bordeaux for the transfer of Gourcuff. After passing his medical on 25 August, Gourcuff signed a five-year contract with the club for a fee of €22 million, to be paid in three installments by 31 December 2012. Gourcuff selected the number 29 shirt and made his club debut on 28 August in the team's 2–0 defeat to Lorient. Gourcuff appeared as a substitute in the match for the injured César Delgado. On 17 October, he scored his first goal for the Lyon in the club's 3–1 win over Lille. In the UEFA Champions League, Gourcuff scored his first goal in the team's 4–3 group stage defeat to Portuguese club Benfica on 2 November. In mid-November, he assisted on game-winning goals in back-to-back weeks against Nice and Lens.

In early February 2011, Gourcuff admitted that he was "disappointed and frustrated" with his performances with Lyon since joining the club stating "I expected a lot more of myself" and "It's clear that my attacking contribution is not enough". Gourcuff also admitted that he was struggling to adapt to the style of manager Claude Puel, though the player later clarified his statements stating that they were misinterpreted. Two weeks after his comments, on 18 February 2011, Gourcuff scored his third goal for Lyon in the club's 4–0 win over Nancy. He, subsequently, went scoreless for the next two months with his only statistical output being an assist on a Jimmy Briand goal in a 3–0 win over Lens on 10 April. On 27 April, Gourcuff scored the match-winning goal in a 3–2 victory against Montpellier after appearing as a substitute two minutes prior. A week later, his season was ended prematurely after suffering an adductor injury in a 2–0 defeat to Toulouse. Gourcuff finished his debut campaign at Lyon with 36 total appearances, four goals, and five assists.

On 26 July 2011, it was reported by Lyon that Gourcuff would undergo ankle surgery in order to heal a niggling ankle complaint. The surgery ruled Gourcuff out for the club's entire 2011–12 pre-season campaign. In September 2011, he suffered an injury setback in training, which prevented the player from making his debut under new manager Rémi Garde against Marseille on 18 September. Gourcuff made his season debut a month later appearing as a substitute in a 3–1 win over Nancy. Two weeks later, he scored his first goal of the season in a 2–0 win over rivals Saint-Étienne.

Gourcuff consistently suffered injury after joining Lyon, missing over 90 games due to injury during his tenure with the club.

=== Return to Rennes ===
Yoann Gourcuff accepted a one-year deal with his former club Rennes. He was officially unveiled on 16 September 2015. His first appearance for the club came against local rivals FC Lorient in January 2016. In the dying minutes of the game which would ultimately finish 2–2, Gourcuff found himself in the penalty area with a chance to strike, but was unfortunately tackled by one of his own teammates: Cheikh M'Bengue. This tackle put the playmaker out of action for another month. He returned in February and gradually started to put together a run of games, during which his manager Rolland Courbis revealed that he was only operating at "60% of his capacity" and was getting better each week. Gourcuff finally managed to score again for Rennes on 18 March 2016, netting twice in a 5–2 victory against Marseille. These two goals came exactly ten years after his last goal in a Rennes shirt. In June 2018, having played just 10 league matches the season before, Gourcuff was released by Rennes.

=== Dijon ===
In July 2018, free agent Gourcuff signed a one-year contract with Ligue 1 side Dijon. He made his debut for the club as an 87th minute substitute in a 2–1 league win over Montpellier on 11 August 2018. On 23 January 2019, having made only eight appearances for the club, his contract at the club was terminated by agreement after he suffered a muscle injury which ruled him out for the remainder of the season.

In October 2020, Yoann's father Christian confirmed that Yoann had retired from playing.

== International career ==
=== Youth ===
Gourcuff was capped for France at the schoolboy level earning his first youth cap with the under-17 team in a 0–0 draw with Spain on 18 September 2002. He scored his first goal for the team on 5 February 2003 in a friendly match against the Czech Republic. Gourcuff finished the season with the under-17 team accumulating twelve appearances and netting two goals as the squad failed to qualify for the 2003 UEFA European Under-17 Championship. Gourcuff made only four appearances with the under-18 team scoring his only goal on 30 October in a 2–2 friendly draw with Ukraine. Gourcuff returned to international level with the under-19 team and was a part of the winning team at the 2005 UEFA European Under-19 Championship. Leading up to the tournament, Gourcuff scored goals against Armenia in the first qualifying round and Spain in the Elite round. The 1–0 victory over Spain assured France's qualification for the tournament. In the tournament, Gourcuff scored a hat-trick in a 3–1 victory over Norway converting two penalty kicks and scoring in the run of play. He assisted on two goals in the team's 3–2 semi-final win over Germany and played the entire match in the championship match against England. France won the match 3–1 giving the nation its sixth under-19 title and Gourcuff his first international honor. In total with the under-19 team, Gourcuff featured in 17 matches and scored seven goals.

Gourcuff made his debut for the under-21 team on 18 May 2006 in a preparatory friendly match for the 2006 UEFA European Under-21 Championship against Croatia. In the tournament, Gourcuff was the team's lone underage player and played in all four of the team's matches as France reached the semi-finals losing in extra time to the Netherlands. On 5 September 2006, Gourcuff scored his first under-21 goal in a 2007 UEFA European Under-21 Championship qualification match against Slovenia. France, however, failed to qualify for the tournament. On 27 March 2007, Gourcuff captained the under-21 team for the first time in a 1–0 defeat to Norway. Due to injury, he missed the 2009 UEFA European Under-21 Championship qualification play-offs against Germany. France lost the tie 2–1 on aggregate. The negative result ended Gourcuff's under-21 career.

=== Senior ===
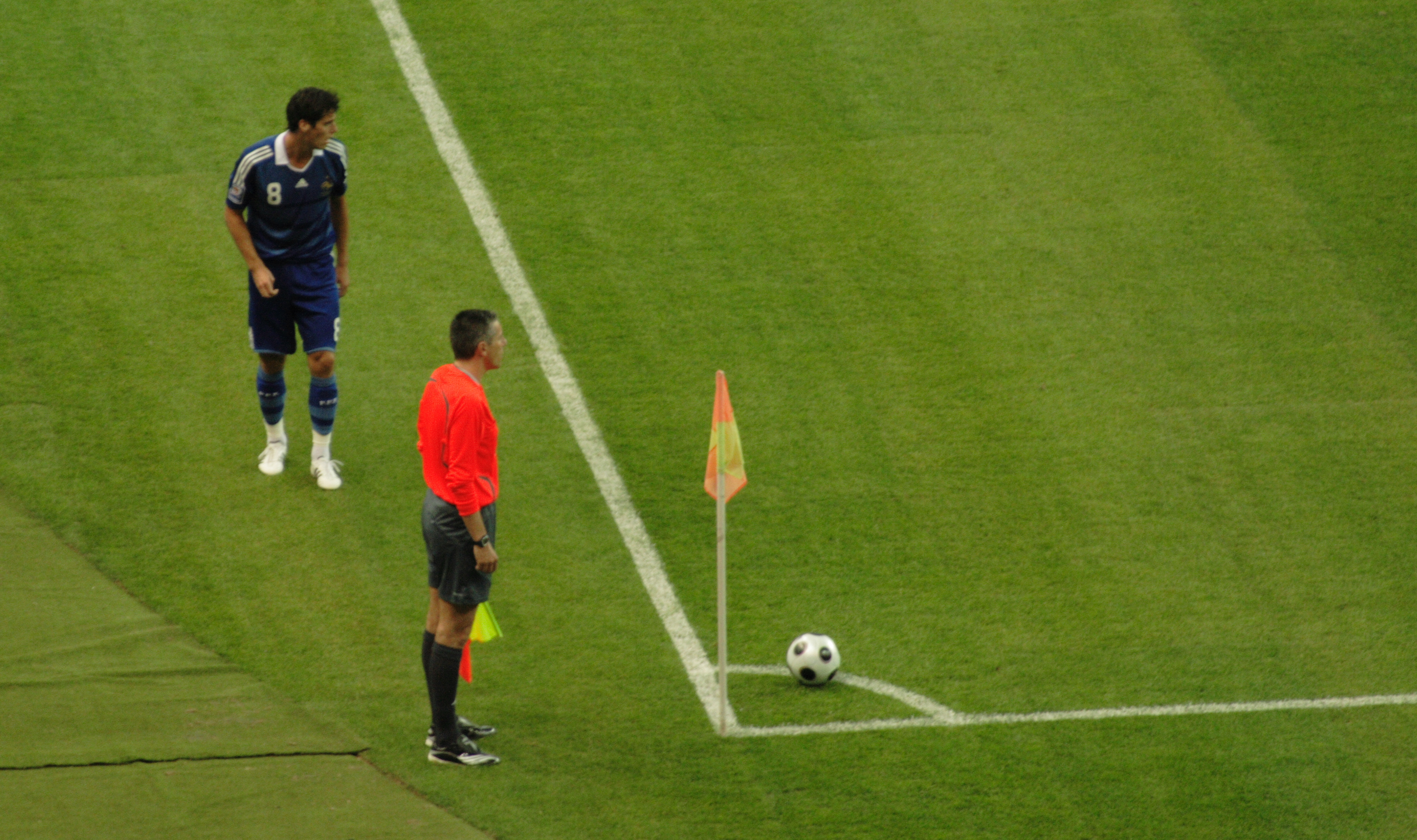
Gourcuff (8), preparing to take a corner kick for France.

Gourcuff earned his first call up to the senior team on 11 August 2008 for the team's friendly match against Sweden that was played on 20 August. He earned his first cap in that match appearing as a substitute in the 92nd minute when France's 3–2 victory had been all but confirmed. He scored his first goal for Les Bleus on 11 October 2008 against Romania in a 2010 World Cup qualification match. The wonder strike from almost 30 yards out drew the match at 2–2 ensuring France's positioning in the group. Since the match against Serbia, held a month before the match against Romania, manager Raymond Domenech has installed Gourcuff in the attacking midfield position, just behind the striker, a position that some believe has yet to be filled since the retirement of Zinedine Zidane following the 2006 World Cup. On 30 May, Gourcuff assisted on the equalizing goal scored by William Gallas in the team's 1–1 draw with Tunisia.

Gourcuff was a member of France's 23-man team that competed in the 2010 FIFA World Cup. On 11 June 2010, Gourcuff made his FIFA World Cup debut in the team's opening group stage match against Uruguay. The match ended 0–0 with Gourcuff being substituted out in the second half. Following the match against Uruguay, former international Just Fontaine stated that Gourcuff "was lost" during the match. It was later reported by the media that midfielder Franck Ribéry and striker Nicolas Anelka had purposely "frozen-out" Gourcuff in the Uruguay match. In the team's final group stage match against the hosts South Africa, Gourcuff was sent off in the first half after the referee ruled that he intentionally elbowed an opposing player in the face. France lost the match 2–1, which resulted in its elimination from the competition.

Due to his red card suspension in the World Cup, Gourcuff missed two call-ups to the national team in August and September. In October 2010, he was called back into the team by his former manager at Bordeaux Laurent Blanc for UEFA Euro 2012 qualifying matches against Romania and Luxembourg. In the match against Romania, Gourcuff appeared as a substitute and scored the final goal in the team's 2–0 victory. He was inserted into the starting lineup against Luxembourg and responded by assisting on the opening goal scored by Karim Benzema and scoring the second goal in another 2–0 win.

Gourcuff was not included in France's squad for UEFA Euro 2012.

On 8 November 2012, he was recalled by new coach Didier Deschamps for a friendly match with Italy. In the match, he appeared as a 73rd-minute substitute for Mathieu Valbuena.

== Career statistics ==
=== Club ===
Appearances and goals by club, season and competition
Club	Season	League			National cup (Note: Appearances in Coupe de France, Coppa Italia)		League cup (Note: Appearances in Coupe de la Ligue)		Europe (Note: Appearances in UEFA Champions League, UEFA Europa League)		Other (Note: Appearances in Trophée des Champions, Supercoppa Italiana, UEFA Super Cup, FIFA Club World Cup)		Total	
Club	Season	Division	Apps	Goals	Apps	Goals	Apps	Goals	Apps	Goals	Apps	Goals	Apps	Goals
Rennes	2003–04	Ligue 1	9	0	0	0	0	0	—		—		9	0
Rennes	2004–05	Ligue 1	21	0	1	0	1	0	—		—		23	0
Rennes	2005–06	Ligue 1	36	6	5	0	1	0	5	0	—		47	6
Rennes	Total		66	6	6	0	2	0	5	0	0	0	79	6
AC Milan	2006–07	Serie A	21	1	4	0	—		9	1	—		34	2
AC Milan	2007–08	Serie A	15	1	2	0	—		3	0	0	0	20	1
AC Milan	Total		36	2	6	0	—		12	1	0	0	54	3
Bordeaux (loan)	2008–09	Ligue 1	37	12	1	0	3	1	7	2	1	0	49	15
Bordeaux	2009–10	Ligue 1	29	6	2	0	3	1	8	2	1	0	43	9
Bordeaux	2010–11	Ligue 1	3	0	0	0	0	0	—		—		3	0
Bordeaux	Total		32	6	2	0	3	1	8	2	1	0	46	9
Lyon	2010–11	Ligue 1	24	3	1	0	1	0	7	1	—		33	4
Lyon	2011–12	Ligue 1	13	2	3	0	2	0	5	0	—		23	2
Lyon	2012–13	Ligue 1	18	3	1	0	0	0	3	1	1	0	23	4
Lyon	2013–14	Ligue 1	18	3	2	1	2	2	8	0	—		30	6
Lyon	2014–15	Ligue 1	17	3	1	0	1	0	0	0	—		19	3
Lyon	Total		90	14	8	1	6	2	23	2	1	0	128	19
Rennes	2015–16	Ligue 1	12	2	—		—		—		—		12	2
Rennes	2016–17	Ligue 1	27	4	0	0	1	0	—		—		28	4
Rennes	2017–18	Ligue 1	10	1	0	0	3	0	—		—		13	1
Rennes	Total		49	7	0	0	4	0	0	0	0	0	53	7
Dijon	2018–19	Ligue 1	8	0	—		—		—		—		8	0
Career total			318	47	23	1	18	4	55	7	3	0	427	59

=== International ===
Appearances and goals by national team and year
National team	Year	Apps	Goals
France	2008	6	1
France	2009	10	0
France	2010	9	2
France	2011	3	1
France	2012	2	0
France	2013	1	0
Total		31	4

Scores and results list France's goal tally first, score column indicates score after each Gourcuff goal

List of international goals scored by Yoann Gourcuff
No.	Date	Venue	Opponent	Score	Result	Competition
1	11 October 2008	Stadionul Farul, Constanța, Romania	Romania	2–2	2–2	2010 FIFA World Cup qualification
2	9 October 2010	Stade de France, Paris, France	Romania	2–0	2–0	UEFA Euro 2012 qualification
3	12 October 2010	Stade Saint-Symphorien, Metz, France	Luxembourg	2–0	2–0	UEFA Euro 2012 qualification
4	25 March 2011	Stade Josy Barthel, Luxembourg City, Luxembourg	Luxembourg	2–0	2–0	UEFA Euro 2012 qualification

== Honours ==
AC Milan

- UEFA Champions League: 2006–07
- UEFA Super Cup: 2007
- FIFA Club World Cup: 2007

Bordeaux

- Ligue 1: 2008–09
- Coupe de la Ligue: 2008–09
- Trophée des Champions: 2008, 2009

Lyon

- Coupe de France: 2011–12
- Trophée des Champions: 2012

France U19

- UEFA European Under-19 Championship: 2005

Individual

- Ligue 1 Player of the Month: March 2006, April 2009
- Ligue 1 Player of the Year: 2008–09
- Ligue 1 Team of the Year: 2008–09, 2009–10
- Ligue 1 Goal of the Year: 2008–09
- French Player of the Year: 2009
