= Bernard Samson (footballer) =

French footballer (1958–2025)

Personal information
- Date of birth: 12 December 1958
- Place of birth: Plancoët, France
- Date of death: 10 June 2025 (aged 66)
- Height: 1.73 m (5 ft 8 in)
- Positions: Midfielder; defender

Youth career
- La Plancoëtine
- ?–1980: Stade Briochin

Senior career*
| Years | Team | Apps | (Gls) |
| 1980–1986 | Rennes | 95 | (10) |
| 1985–1986 | → Abbeville | 31 | (0) |
| 1986–1987 | Guingamp | 28 | (3) |
| 1987–1993 | Stade léonard Kreisker | ? | (?) |
- * Club domestic league appearances and goals

Bernard Samson (12 December 1958 – 10 June 2025) was a French footballer who played as a midfielder and defender.

== Biography ==
Born on 12 December 1958 in Plancoët, Samson was the son of Joseph Samson, mayor of the municipality from 1956 to 1983. He began his football career with La Plancoëtine before joining Stade Briochin upon the request of Pierre Garcia. In 1980, he joined Stade Rennais FC and initially played for the reserve team during his first two seasons, during which he won a Division 4 championship. He also played his first Division 2 match on 27 February 1981 against FC Rouen. During the 1982–83 season, he was brought up to the professional squad at Rennes. He initially competed with Christian Zajaczkowski and Farès Bousdira for the midfielder position before being moved back to defender. Rennes moved up to Division 1 in 1983 before being relegated the following season. However, the club again moved back up to Division 1 the next season, with Samson scoring in a penalty shootout against Rouen goalkeeper Michel Bensoussan.

After winning the Division 2 championship in 1985, Samson was loaned to SC Abbeville for the 1985–86 season. He then moved to En Avant Guingamp, where he played for one season. He finished his career with Stade léonard Kreisker as a player-coach. He later became coach of several amateur clubs, including Frémur-Fresnaye. In July 2000, he celebrated his jubilee alongside Jean Vincent, Philippe Tibeuf, and Christophe Revel.

Samson died on 10 June 2025, at the age of 66.
