= Erwan Quintin =

French footballer (born 1984)

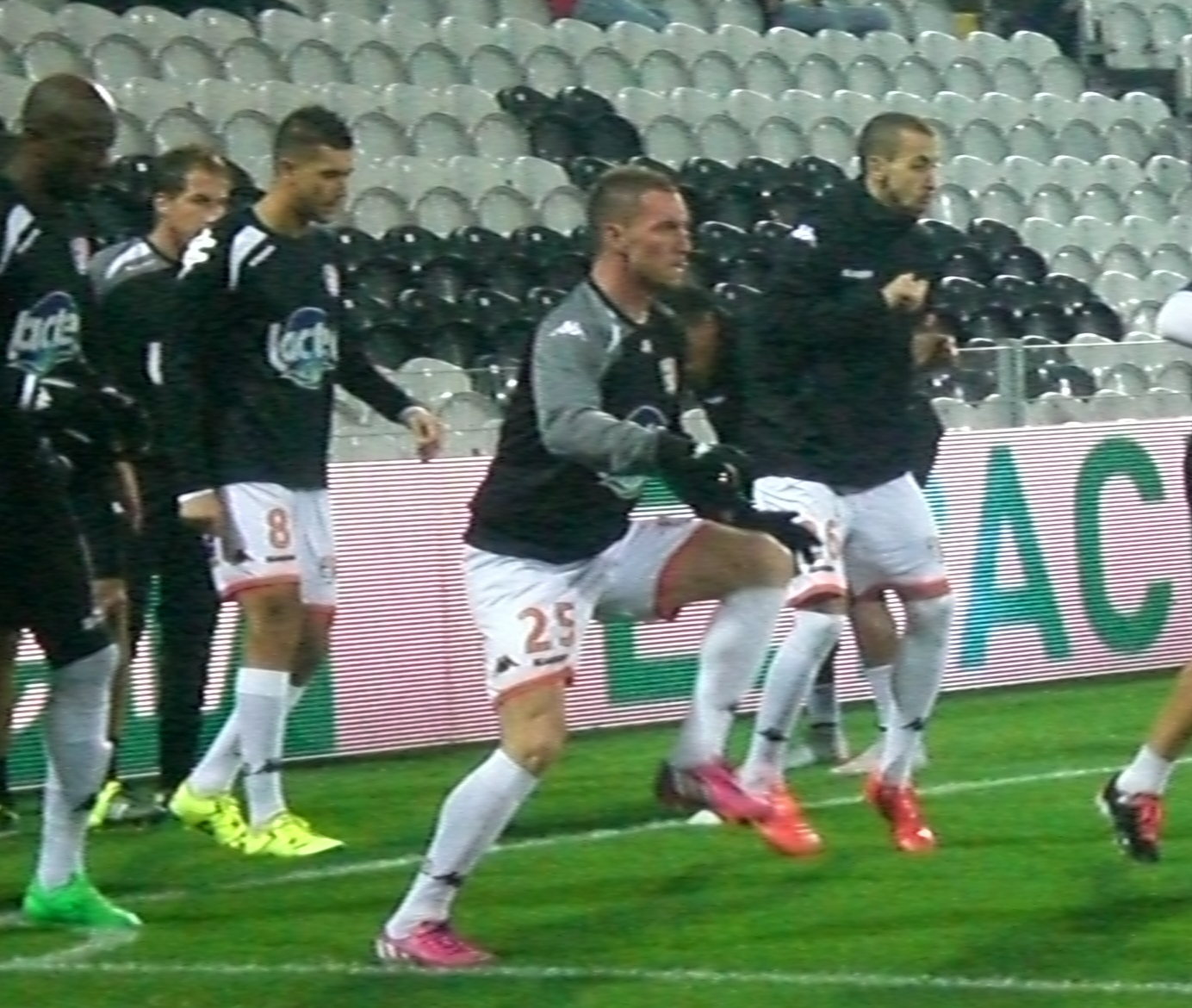
- Quintin in 2015

Personal information
- Date of birth: 1 February 1984 (age 42)
- Place of birth: Auray, France
- Height: 1.80 m (5 ft 11 in)
- Position: Midfielder

Team information
- Current team: Ploemel

Youth career
- 1997–2002: Vannes

Senior career*
Years	Team	Apps	(Gls)
2002–2003	Vannes	24	(2)
2003–2005	Bordeaux	1	(0)
2005–2006	Entente SSG	31	(2)
2006–2007	Nîmes	24	(2)
2007–2012	Vannes	140	(6)
2012–2015	Arles-Avignon	78	(1)
2015	Châteauroux	4	(0)
2015	Châteauroux B	1	(0)
2015–2017	Laval	52	(2)
2016	Laval B	1	(0)
2017–2022	Vannes	84	(7)
2022–	Ploemel		

International career
2008	Brittany	1	
- * Club domestic league appearances and goals as of 1 July 2022

Erwan Quintin (born 1 February 1984) is a French professional footballer who plays as a midfielder for Ploemel.

== Career ==
Quintin was born in Auray. He started his career in the youth ranks of Vannes at the age of 19, progressing to the first team in 2002. He left in 2003 and joined the reserves of Bordeaux. He was taken into the first team training group when senior players departed for the 2004 African Cup of Nations, and made his one Ligue 1 appearance for the club as a substitute against Nantes on 6 February 2004.

In his second spell at Vannes, Quintin played in 37 of 38 league games as the club won the 2007–08 Championnat National. He was also in the team that were runners-up in the 2009 Coupe de la Ligue Final, beating Ligue 1 opposition three times on the way to the final.

In January 2015, Whilst playing for Châteauroux, Quintin suffered serious head injuries in an aerial challenge during the match again Clermont. He required surgery for broken jaw, nose and palate, and suffered twelve broken teeth.

Quintin rejoined Vannes for a third spell in 2017, leaving Laval after two seasons for what he described in an interview as "personal reasons", giving up his professional status.

In a professional career spanning 14 seasons, by March 2021 Quintin had made 215 appearances in Ligue 2 for Vannes, Arles-Avignon, Châteauroux and Laval and 114 in the Championnat National for Entente SSG, Nîmes and Vannes.

In summer 2022, he joined lower-league side Ploemel.

== Honours ==
Vannes

- Championnat National: 2007–08
- Coupe de la Ligue: runner-up 2008–09
