= Matthieu Chalmé =

French footballer (born 1980)

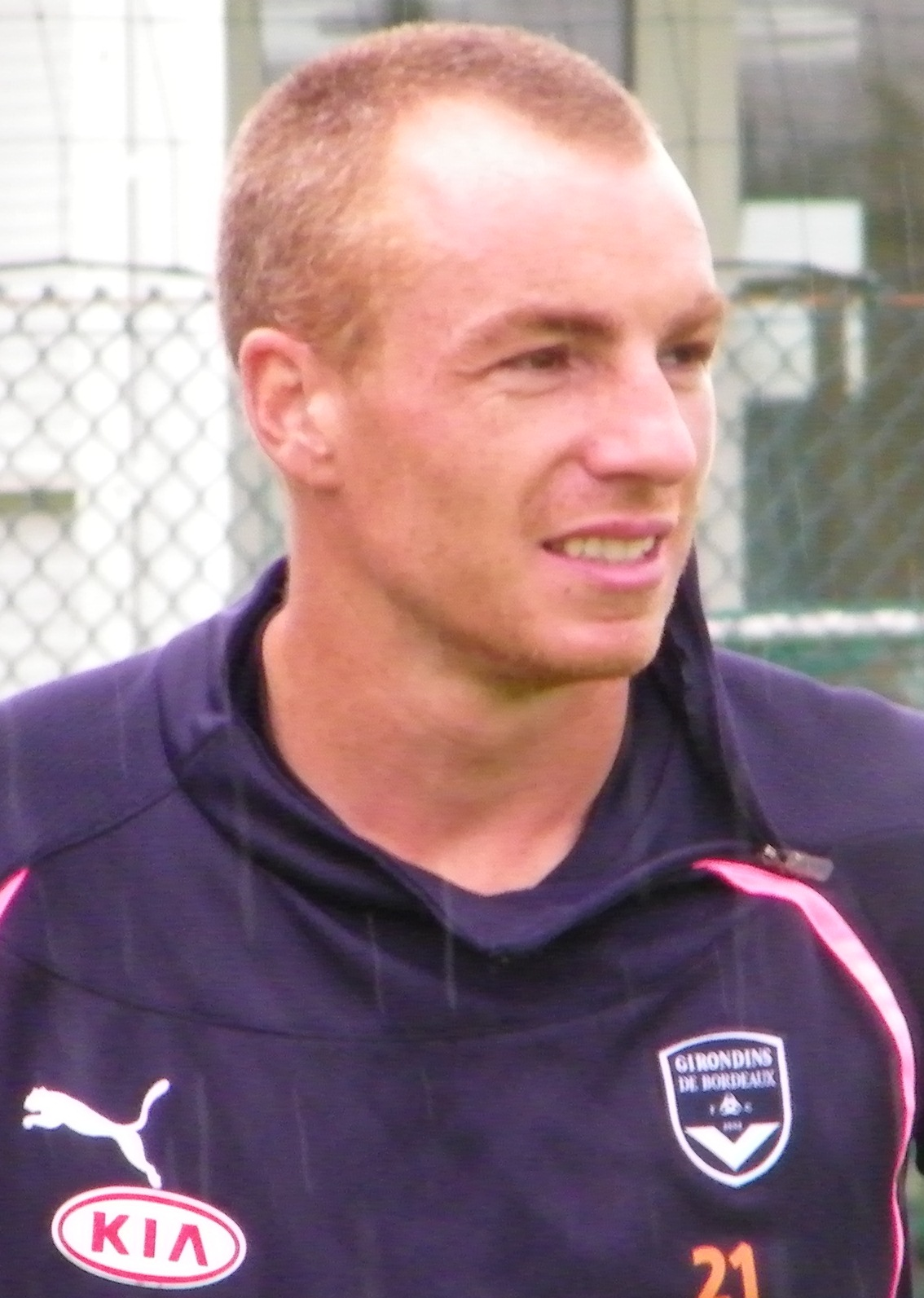
- Chalmé with Bordeaux in 2010

Personal information
- Full name: Matthieu Chalmé
- Date of birth: 7 October 1980 (age 46)
- Place of birth: Bruges, France
- Height: 1.75 m (5 ft 9 in)
- Position: Right-back

Senior career*
Years	Team	Apps	(Gls)
1997–2000	Bordeaux B		
2000–2002	Libourne Saint-Seurin		
2002–2007	Lille	128	(3)
2007–2014	Bordeaux	130	(1)
2013	→ Ajaccio (loan)	12	(0)
2014–2015	Lège Cap Ferret	7	(1)
- * Club domestic league appearances and goals

Matthieu Chalmé (born 7 October 1980) is a French former professional footballer who played as a right-back.

== Career ==
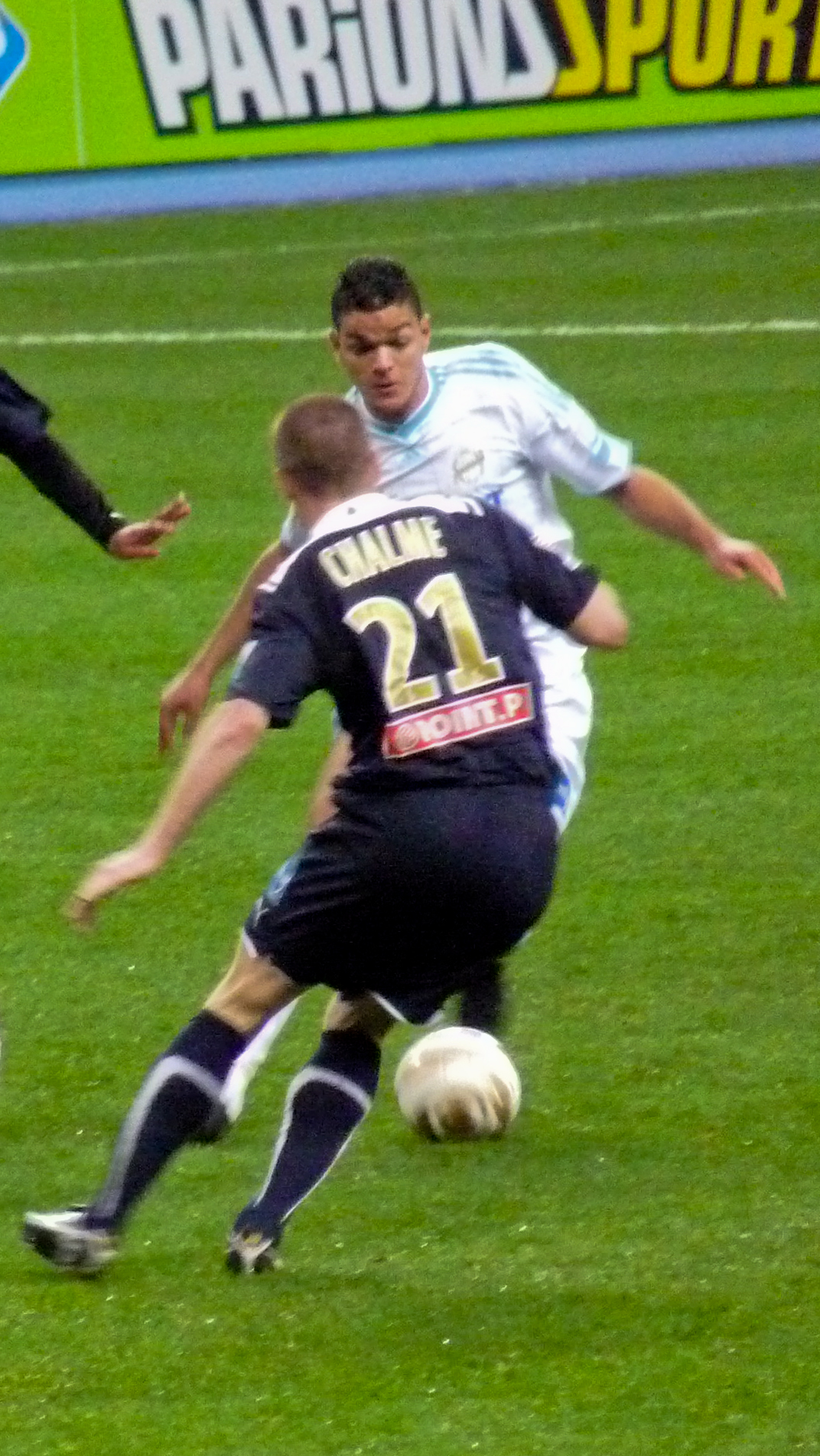
Chalmé with Bordeaux during the Coupe de la Ligue final 2010

Born in Bruges, Chalmé started his career playing with the Bordeaux reserves and Libourne Saint-Seurin in the French fourth tier. While at Libourne-Saint-Seurin, he had a trial at Grimsby Town, but was not signed. At the age of 21, he signed his first professional contract with Ligue 1 club Lille. He played with the club for five years, from 2002 to 2007. After many consistent seasons and appearances in both the Champions League and UEFA Cup, Chalmé was signed by Bordeaux in the summer of 2007. He had made 128 Ligue 1 appearances for Lille.

Chalmé quickly broke through to the first team being a constant presence on the back line. During his second season with the club, he won his first major honour picking up the Trophée des champions at the beginning of the season against reigning Ligue 1 champions Lyon. The season provided more success and trophies for Chalmé as he picked up his first winners' medal in both Ligue 1 and the Coupe de la Ligue. The next season proved rather disappointing for both Bordeaux and Chalmé. While Bordeaux did win the 2009 Trophée des Champions against Guingamp in July, Bordeaux were less successful in the league. Chalmé and the club were performing well in Ligue 1 until a significant drop in form caused them to finish sixth and miss out on European competition for the next season. The right back also helped them reach the 2010 Coupe de la Ligue final, but lost 3–1 to Marseille, with Chalmé scoring an own goal to seal the win for their opponents.

== Honours ==
Lille

- UEFA Intertoto Cup: 2004

Bordeaux

- Ligue 1: 2008–09
- Coupe de la Ligue: 2009
- Trophée des Champions: 2008, 2009
