= Jérôme Lebouc =

French footballer (born 1979)

Personal information
- Full name: Jérôme Lebouc
- Date of birth: 26 December 1979 (age 46)
- Place of birth: Vitré, Ille-et-Vilaine, France
- Height: 1.79 m (5 ft 10 in)
- Position: Midfielder

Senior career*
Years	Team	Apps	(Gls)
1997–2001	Vitré		
2001–2002	Pontivy	16	(1)
2002–2003	FC Marmande 47		
2003–2004	Pau	35	(2)
2004–2005	Valenciennes	15	(2)
2005–2006	Croix de Savoie	0	(0)
2006–2009	Vannes	98	(24)
2009–2013	Laval	104	(19)
2013–2016	FC Marmande 47		

International career
2008	Brittany	1	
- * Club domestic league appearances and goals

Jérôme Lebouc (born 26 December 1979) is a French former professional football midfielder. He previously played for Ligue 2 side Vannes and Laval.

== Honours ==
Vannes

- Coupe de la Ligue: runner-up 2008–09
