= Laurent Hervé =

French footballer and manager (born 1976)

Personal information
- Full name: Laurent Hervé
- Date of birth: 19 June 1976 (age 50)
- Place of birth: Pont-l'Abbé, France
- Height: 1.85 m (6 ft 1 in)
- Position: Midfielder

Senior career*
Years	Team	Apps	(Gls)
1994–2003	Guingamp	91	(2)
2003–2004	Beauvais	12	(0)
2004–2005	Milton Keynes Dons	20	(0)
2005–2011	Vannes	157	(10)
Total		280	(12)

Managerial career
- 2014–2020: Vannes
- 2020–: Vitré
- * Club domestic league appearances and goals

Laurent Hervé (born 19 June 1976) is a French former professional football midfielder who is manager of AS Vitré. He was previously manager at Vannes, where he ended his playing career.

== Honours ==
Vannes

- Coupe de la Ligue: runner-up 2008–09
