= Kemal Bourhani =

Comorian footballer (born 1981)

Personal information
- Full name: Kemal Bourhani
- Date of birth: 13 September 1981 (age 45)
- Place of birth: Paris, France
- Height: 1.80 m (5 ft 11 in)
- Position: Striker

Youth career
- INF Clairefontaine
- 1998–2001: Guingamp

Senior career*
Years	Team	Apps	(Gls)
2001–2005	Guingamp	34	(5)
2005–2008	Lorient	47	(11)
2008–2010	Vannes OC	32	(0)
2011–2012	AS Beauvais	13	(0)
2013–2014	AS Gabès	0	(0)
2014–2015	Entente SSG	3	(0)

International career
2011	Comoros	1	(0)
- * Club domestic league appearances and goals

Kemal Bourhani (born 13 September 1981) (Note: Kemal Bourhani – French league stats at LFP – also available in French (archived)) is a former footballer who played as a striker. Born in France, he represented Comoros at international level.

== Club career ==
Bourhani played in Ligue 1 for En Avant de Guingamp and FC Lorient and in Ligue 2 for AS Beauvais Oise and Vannes OC.

== International career ==
Paris-born Bourhani played his first and last international match for the Comoros national football team on 28 March 2011 against Libya.
