= Nicolas Flégeau =

French footballer (born 1985)

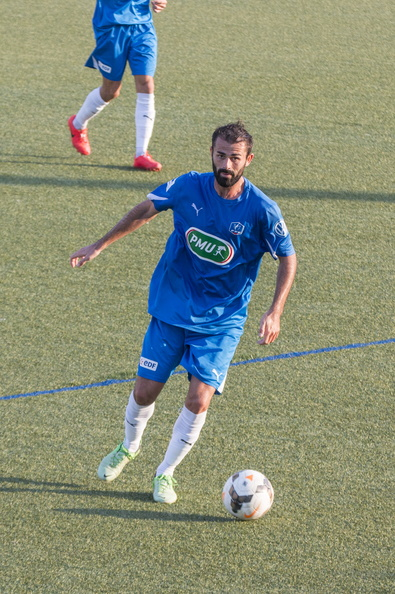
- Flégeau in 2014

Personal information
- Date of birth: 6 September 1985 (age 41)
- Place of birth: Hennebont, France
- Height: 1.82 m (6 ft 0 in)
- Position: Defender

Team information
- Current team: Vannes

Senior career*
Years	Team	Apps	(Gls)
2004–2006	Lorient	5	(0)
2006–2007	Les Herbiers VF	25	(2)
2007–2009	Aviron Bayonnais	39	(2)
2009–2012	Istres	55	(0)
2012	Gazélec Ajaccio	4	(0)
2012–2014	Vannes	49	(0)
2014–2015	Istres	11	(0)
2015–2018	Cholet	87	(1)
2018–2019	Bergerac	27	(1)
2019–2023	Villefranche	100	(1)
2023–	Vannes	29	(0)
- * Club domestic league appearances and goals as of 2 December 2023

Nicolas Flégeau (born 6 September 1985) is a French professional footballer who plays as a defender for Vannes.

== Career ==
Flégeau started his career with Lorient, where he made five appearances in Ligue 2 during the 2004–05 season. He then had spells in the French lower divisions with Les Herbiers and Aviron Bayonnais, before returning to Ligue 2 with newly promoted Istres on 4 June 2012. Flégeau spent three seasons with Istres, playing 55 league matches. On 13 June 2012, he signed for Gazélec Ajaccio on a free transfer. However, with only four Ligue 2 appearances, he left for Vannes OC when Gazélec Ajaccio changed their manager.

In 2014 Flégeau returned to Istres for the start of the season, before signing a two-and-a-half-year contract with SO Cholet in February 2015.

Flégeau left Cholet in the summer of 2018, and signed for Championnat National 2 side Bergerac Périgord FC. After a year he moved to FC Villefranche in the Championnat National.

On 26 July 2023, Flégeau returned to Vannes in the fifth-tier Championnat National 3.
