= Christophe Revel =

French footballer (born 1979)

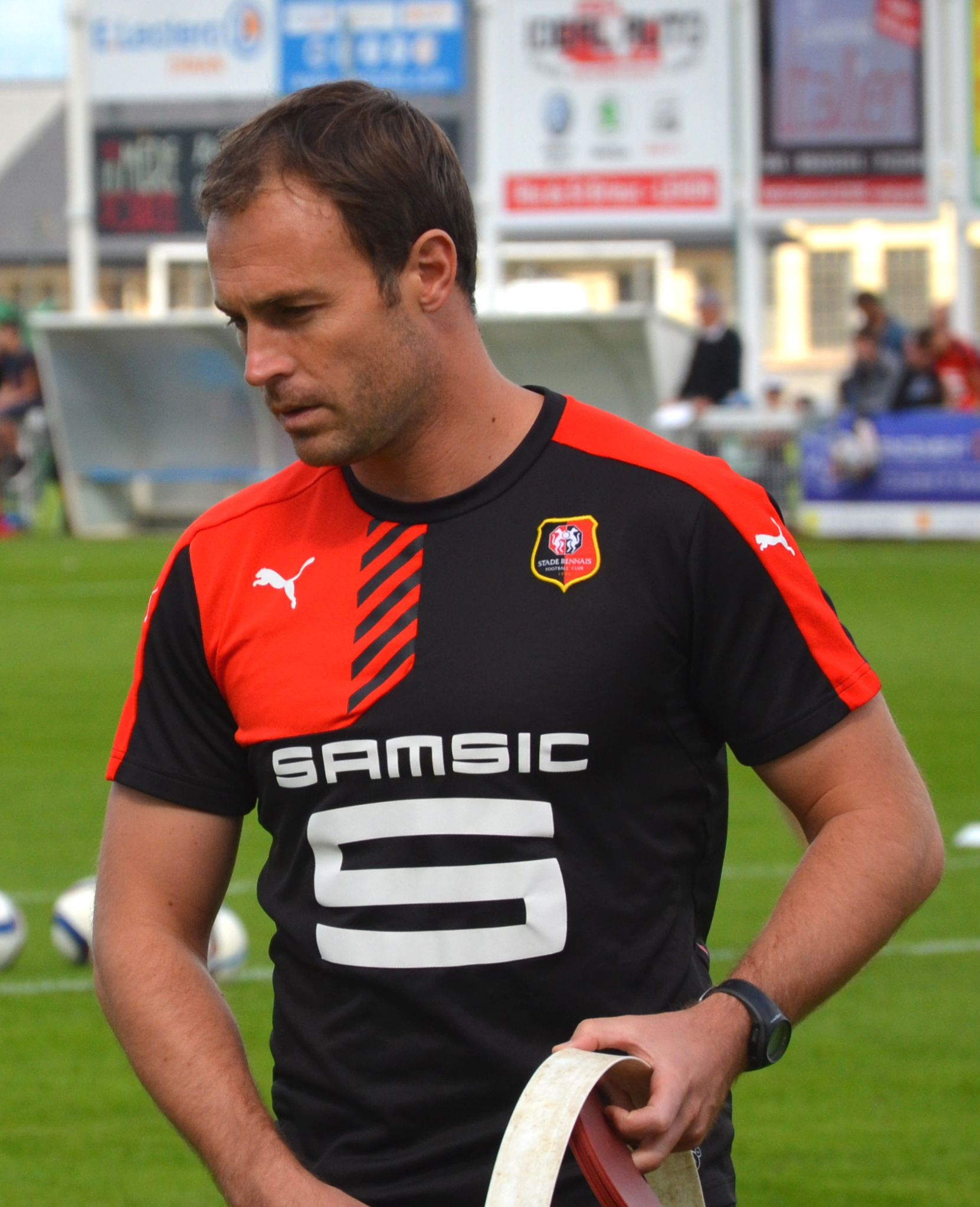
- Revel at Rennes's training in 2015

Personal information
- Date of birth: 25 March 1979 (age 47)
- Place of birth: Dinan, France
- Height: 1.80 m (5 ft 11 in)
- Position: Goalkeeper

Senior career*
Years	Team	Apps	(Gls)
2000–2003	Rennes	1	(0)
2000–2001	→ Beveren (loan)	10	(0)
2003–2004	Pontivy	34	(0)
2004–2009	Vannes		

International career
2008	Brittany	1	(0)

Managerial career
- 2009–2017: Rennes (goalkeeping coach)
- 2018–2019: Lorient (goalkeeping coach)
- 2020: Morocco (goalkeeping coach)
- 2020–2021: Lyon (goalkeeping coach)
- 2021–2022: Lille (goalkeeping coach)
- 2022–2025: Brest (goalkeeping coach)
- * Club domestic league appearances and goals

Christophe Revel (born 25 March 1979) is a French former professional footballer who played as a goalkeeper.

== Coaching career ==
Revel ended his playing career at the age of 30, taking the goalkeeping coach position at Rennes. He was released from the position in August 2017. In June 2018, Revel joined FC Lorient in a similar position. He left Lorient at the end of May 2019, when a new manager was appointed.

In 2020, Revel had a short stint as goalkeeper coach of the Moroccan national team under Vahid Halilhodžić. He left the position in June 2020, where he joined Lyon on a one-year contract.

In the summer 2021, Revel joined Lille OSC as a goalkeeper coach.

== Honours ==
Vannes

- Coupe de la Ligue: runner-up 2008–09
