= Wendel (footballer, born 1982) =

Brazilian association football player

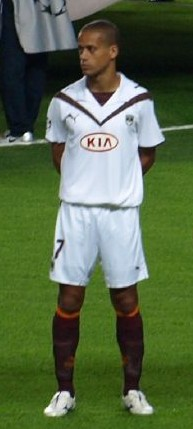

Personal information
- Full name: Wendel Geraldo Maurício e Silva
- Date of birth: 8 April 1982 (age 44)
- Place of birth: Mariana, Minas Gerais, Brazil
- Height: 1.84 m (6 ft 0 in)
- Position: Midfielder

Youth career
- 1998–1999: Cruzeiro

Senior career*
Years	Team	Apps	(Gls)
2000–2006	Cruzeiro	87	(4)
2005	→ Nacional da Madeira (loan)	15	(4)
2005–2006	→ Santos (loan)	45	(3)
2006–2011	Bordeaux	150	(35)
2011–2012	Al-Ittihad	15	(6)
2012	Al-Shabab	9	(3)
2012–2013	Vasco da Gama	69	(1)
2014–2015	Sport Recife	96	(3)
2016	Goiás	23	(1)
2016–2017	Ponte Preta	47	(4)
2018	Náutico	2	(0)
Total		558	(64)

International career
2004	Brazil U23	6	(0)
- * Club domestic league appearances and goals

Wendel Geraldo Maurício e Silva, commonly known as Wendel, (born 8 April 1982) is a Brazilian former professional footballer who played as a midfielder.

== Club career ==
Wendel started his career with Cruzeiro Esporte Clube in 1998 with the youth team. By 2000 he began featuring in some matches for the senior side. In 2005, he was loaned out to Santos on an 18-month deal. After a successful spell there, Wendel secured a move to Bordeaux from Cruzeiro in August 2006.

=== Bordeaux ===
Soon after he signed for Bordeaux, he broke into the first team and by the end of his first season he had played a total of 29 league games with five goals. He was much more active in his second season, scoring 12 league goals to go along with seven assists in 36 league games. The 2008–09 started brightly for Wendel as he started every game. In the season opener against Caen he had a free-kick on target in the early minutes, had an open shot on target and then set up Yoann Gourcuff to score from outside the area. Then against Nantes he set up a goal. After four games he finally opened his account by scoring against Nice, following this up by scoring again three days later against Le Havre in a 2–2 draw. Bordeaux went on to win Ligue 1, the club's first title triumph since 1999 and added the Coupe de la Ligue trophy in 2009 under the management of Laurent Blanc. In the Coupe de la Ligue Final, Wendel opened the scoring in the third minute against Ligue 2 side Vannes OC in an eventual 4–0 triumph for his side. Wendel appeared in 29 games that season, starting 25 of them, and added four goals and nine assists. The 2009–10 campaign for Bordeaux would prove to be less successful, as they could not retain their league or league cup trophies. However, Wendel was very productive in the league from his wide position, scoring 11 goals and adding six assists. The following season proved even more difficult after the departures of Marouane Chamakh and Gourcuff. Wendel's last appearance for the club came on 29 May 2011, in the final match of the 2010–11 Ligue 1 season. He capped his final performance with a goal in a 2–0 victory over Montpellier HSC which ensured that Bordeaux finished the season in 7th place.

=== Al-Ittihad ===
After five seasons in the southwest of France, Wendel moved on in August 2011. During his time with Les Girondins he scored 35 goals in 156 Ligue 1 appearances, scoring hat tricks against Toulouse FC and PSG. After his departure, he signed for Saudi Arabian side Al-Ittihad.

== International career ==
Wendel was first capped for Brazil at the 2004 CONMEBOL Men Pre-Olympic Tournament.

== Career statistics ==
Correct as of 7 March 2010

Appearances and goals by club, season and competition
Season	Team	League		Cup		Europe		Total	
Season	Team	Apps	Goals	Apps	Goals	Apps	Goals	Apps	Goals
Bordeaux	2006–07	29	5	0	0	6	0	35	5
Bordeaux	2007–08	36	11	0	0	5	1	41	12
Bordeaux	2008–09	29	4	4	2	8	1	41	7
Bordeaux	2009–10	22	7	7	4	8	0	37	11
Total		114	27	10	6	26	2	150	35

== Honours ==
Cruzeiro

- Brazil Cup: 2000, 2003
- South-Minas Cup: 2001, 2002
- Campeonato Mineiro: 2003, 2004
- Campeonato Brasileiro Série A: 2003

Santos

- Campeonato Paulista: 2006

Bordeaux

- Ligue 1: 2008–09
- Coupe de la Ligue: 2007, 2009
- Trophée des Champions: 2008, 2009

Al-Shabab

- Saudi Professional League: 2011-12

Sport Recife

- Copa do Nordeste: 2014
- Campeonato Pernambucano: 2014

Goiás

- Campeonato Goiano: 2016
