= Frédéric Sammaritano =

French footballer (born 1986)

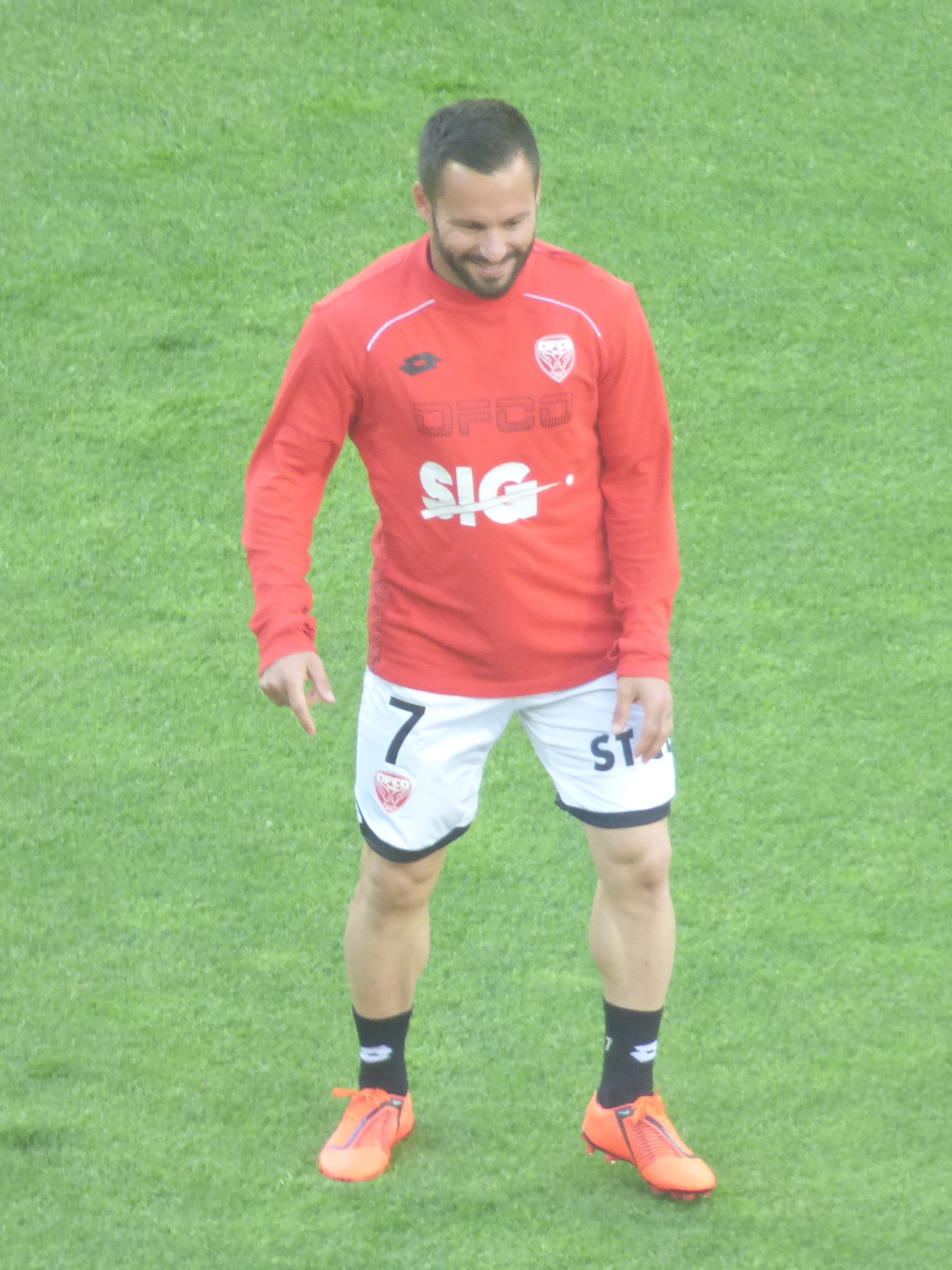

Personal information
- Date of birth: 23 March 1986 (age 40)
- Place of birth: Vannes, France
- Height: 1.62 m (5 ft 4 in)
- Position: Midfielder

Senior career*
Years	Team	Apps	(Gls)
2006–2007	Moulins Yzeure Foot	32	(8)
2007–2010	Vannes	112	(20)
2010–2011	Auxerre	27	(1)
2011–2013	Ajaccio	52	(6)
2013–2015	Auxerre	47	(7)
2015–2022	Dijon	164	(11)
Total		434	(53)
- * Club domestic league appearances and goals

Frédéric Sammaritano (born 23 March 1986) is a French former professional footballer.

== Career ==
Born in Vannes, Sammaritano spent three seasons at local club Vannes. In his last campaign with the club, he scored three goals and added seven assists. His good performances in Ligue 2 lead many to be interested in securing his signature. Sammaritano joined Auxerre, who finished in third spot during the 2009–10 Ligue 1 season, thus qualifying for UEFA Champions League football. In the 2010–11 Champions League, he scored against Ajax in a 2–1 victory for Auxerre. Sammaritano, however, found life in Burgundy difficult, starting just ten Ligue 1 fixtures, adding only one league goal and three assists.

In July 2011, Sammaritano signed for newly promoted AC Ajaccio on a free transfer. He made his debut for the club in their 2–0 loss to Toulouse on the opening day of the 2011–12 Ligue 1 campaign. Sammaritano scored against French powerhouse Lyon on 13 August 2011, putting his side 1–0 up at the Stade de Gerland. His first goal since November 2010, however, did not prove enough, as Lisandro López scored late on, sealing a 1–1 draw and Ajaccio's first point of the season. In the following round of fixtures, on 20 August, Ajaccio played host to Evian in Corsica; Sammaritano netted in the seventh minute after being fed in by Johan Cavalli, giving his side a 1–0 lead.

On 5 March 2015, well into his second stint with Auxerre, Sammaritano scored the decisive goal in a penalty shootout as Auxerre defeated Brest in the quarter-finals of the Coupe de France, and he scored the only goal as they defeated holders Guingamp in the semi-finals on 7 April.

=== Dijon ===
Sammaritano signed a two-year contract with Dijon after the expiration of his Auxerre contract. Sammaritano announced his retirement from playing after seven seasons with Dijon on 3 May 2022.

== Honours ==
Vannes

- Coupe de la Ligue: runner-up 2008–09
