= Seïd Khiter =

French footballer (born 1985)

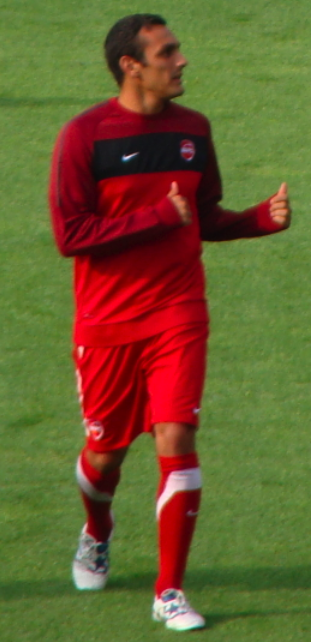
- Khiter with Valenciennes

Personal information
- Date of birth: 19 January 1985 (age 41)
- Place of birth: Roubaix, France
- Height: 1.71 m (5 ft 7 in)
- Position: Striker

Youth career
- 1998–2003: Lens

Senior career*
Years	Team	Apps	(Gls)
2003–2008	Lens	9	(1)
2006–2007	→ Ajaccio (loan)	32	(7)
2008	→ Châteauroux (loan)	15	(2)
2008–2010	Valenciennes	7	(0)
2009	→ Vannes (loan)	6	(2)
2009–2010	→ Strasbourg (loan)	14	(0)
2010–2011	Laval	31	(2)
2012–2014	Royal Mouscron-Peruwelz	58	(19)
2014–2015	Royal Antwerp	24	(4)
2016	Woluwe-Zaventem	8	(1)
2016–2018	Sint-Eloois-Winkel	24	(11)
2018–2019	FC Gullegem	12	(2)
Total		240	(51)
- * Club domestic league appearances and goals

Seïd Khiter (Arabic: سيد خيتر; born 19 January 1985) is a French former professional footballer who played as a striker.

== Club career ==
Khiter was born in Roubaix, France. On 21 January 2009, he joined Vannes OC on loan from Valenciennes FC and on 5 August 2009 he moved to RC Strasbourg, again on loan.

== International career ==
Khiter holds both French and Algerian nationalities. Although he represented France at junior level, Khiter indicated in 2015 that he would join the Algeria national team in the near future.

== Honours ==
Vannes

- Coupe de la Ligue: runner-up 2008–09
