= 2008–09 Coupe de la Ligue =

French League Cup

Tournament details
- Country: France
- Dates: 2 September 2008 – 25 April 2009
- Teams: 45

Final positions
- Champions: Bordeaux (2nd title)
- Runners-up: Vannes

Tournament statistics
- Matches played: 43
- Goals scored: 138 (3.21 per match)
- Top goal scorer: Madjid Bouabdellah (3 goals)

The 2008–09 Coupe de la Ligue began on 19 August 2008, and its final was held on 25 April 2009 at the Stade de France. The former defending champions, Paris Saint-Germain, were initially barred from participating in the cup after a group of PSG supporters unfurled an offensive banner during last year's final. After PSG appealed the ban, however, the Tribunal Administratif de Paris judge vacated the ruling allowing PSG to defend their Coupe de la Ligue title. Due to this, a new draw was announced. French Football Federation (FFF) president Jean-Pierre Escalettes vowed to get the second ruling overturned, stating, "I won't give up," and, "I can't allow acts like this to go unpunished," but was unsuccessful. The winners of the Coupe de la Ligue qualified for the third qualifying round of the 2009–10 UEFA Europa League.

Numbers within brackets represented a team's league level in the 2008–09 season, level 1 being Ligue 1, level 2 Ligue 2, and level 3 the Championnat National.

Ligue 1 club Bordeaux won the competition by defeating Ligue 2 club Vannes by a score of 4–0 in the final.

== Calendar ==
On 16 July, the Ligue de Football Professionnel announced the calendar for the Coupe de la Ligue.

Note: Due to Paris Saint-Germain's re-entry into the tournament, the draw was redone with different dates attached to the matches.

| Date | Event |
|---|---|
| 2 September 2008 | 5 clubs from Championnat National and 5 clubs from Ligue 2 entered the competition |
| 9 September 2008 | Remaining clubs from Ligue 2 entered the competition |
| 23–24 September 2008 | Clubs from Ligue 1, except Olympique Lyonnais and Bordeaux, entered the competition |
| 11–12 November 2008 | Round of 16 (Olympique Lyonnais and Bordeaux entered the competition) |
| 13–14 January 2009 | Quarterfinals |
| 3–4 February 2009 | Semifinals |
| 25 April 2009 (Saturday) | Coupe de la Ligue Final |

== First round ==
The matches were played on 3 September 2008.

| Team 1 | Score | Team 2 |
|---|---|---|
| Créteil (3) | 2–1 | Niort (3) |
| Libourne (3) | 0–2 | Nîmes (2) |
| Istres (3) | 1–1 (a.e.t.) (3–4 p) | Gueugnon (3) |
| Vannes (2) | 3–0 | Dijon (2) |
| Tours (2) | 1–2 | Boulogne (2) |

== Second round ==
The matches were played on 9 September 2008.

| Team 1 | Score | Team 2 |
|---|---|---|
| Guingamp (2) | 2–0 (a.e.t.) | Gueugnon (3) |
| Lens (2) | 4–1 | Sedan (2) |
| Créteil (3) | 2–1 | Brest (2) |
| Metz (2) | 2–1 | Reims (2) |
| Troyes (2) | 2–1 | Angers (2) |
| Vannes (2) | 3–2 (a.e.t.) | Amiens (2) |
| Ajaccio (2) | 2–4 (a.e.t.) | Montpellier (2) |
| Strasbourg (2) | 1–2 (a.e.t.) | Bastia (2) |
| Châteauroux (2) | 3–1 | Nîmes (2) |
| Boulogne (2) | 4–1 | Clermont Foot (2) |

== Third round ==
The matches were played on 23 and 24 September 2008.

| Team 1 | Score | Team 2 |
|---|---|---|
| Vannes (2) | 3–3 (a.e.t.) (5–4 p) | Valenciennes (1) |
| Boulogne (2) | 1–3 | Nice (1) |
| Bastia (2) | 0–1 | Châteauroux (2) |
| Créteil (3) | 1–0 | Nantes (1) |
| Auxerre (1) | 1–1 (a.e.t.) (6–5 p) | Toulouse (1) |
| Monaco (1) | 0–1 | Paris Saint-Germain (1) |
| Montpellier (2) | 2–2 (a.e.t.) (4–2 p) | Lille (1) |
| Metz (2) | 3–1 | Troyes (2) |
| Sochaux (1) | 1–0 | Marseille (1) |
| Lorient (1) | 0–3 | Lens (2) |
| Rennes (1) | 2–2 (a.e.t.) (4–3 p) | Le Mans (1) |
| Grenoble (1) | 2–3 | Nancy (1) |
| Guingamp (2) | 4–1 | Saint-Étienne (1) |
| Le Havre (1) | 3–1 | Caen (1) |

== Final Draw ==
=== Right Side Bracket ===
Round of 16
1 | Lyon | 1
13 | Metz | 3
5 | Vannes | 2
15 | Auxerre | 0
7 | Nice | 3
16 | Créteil | 0
6 | Le Havre | 2
4 | Rennes | 1

Quarterfinals
13 | Metz | 1 (3)
5 | Vannes (pen.) | 1 (4)
7 | Nice | 1
6 | Le Havre | 0

Semi-finals
5 | Vannes (pen.) | 1 (4)
7 | Nice | 1 (3)

=== Left side bracket ===
Round of 16
2 | Bordeaux | 4
11 | Guingamp | 2
14 | Montpellier | 1
10 | Châteauroux | 2
8 | PSG | 2
3 | Nancy | 0
9 | Sochaux | 0
12 | Lens | 1

Quarterfinals
2 | Bordeaux | 2
10 | Châteauroux | 1
8 | PSG | 2
12 | Lens | 0

Semi-finals
2 | Bordeaux | 3
8 | PSG | 0

== Final draw results ==
=== Round of 16 ===
| 11 November 2008 | Sochaux (1) | 0–1 | Lens (2) | Montbéliard |
| | | Report | Yahia 108' | Stadium: Stade Auguste Bonal; Attendance: 17,098; Referee: Jean-Charles Cailleux |

| 11 November 2008 | Bordeaux (1) | 4–2 | Guingamp (2) | Bordeaux |
| | Trémoulinas 13'; Obertan 23', 31'; Cavenaghi 77' | Report | Eduardo 33', 44' (pen.) | Stadium: Stade Chaban Delmas; Attendance: 13,995; Referee: Laurent Duhamel |

| 11 November 2008 | Vannes (2) | 2–0 | Auxerre (1) | Vannes |
| | Hervé 74'; Bourhani 91' | Report | | Stadium: Stade de la Rabine; Attendance: 4,636; Referee: Alexandre Castro |

| 11 November 2008 | Nice (1) | 3–0 | Créteil (3) | Nice |
| | Ben Saada 8' (pen.); Modeste 30'; Bamogo 46' | Report | | Stadium: Stade Municipal du Ray; Attendance: 6,529; Referee: Saïd Ennjimi |

| 11 November 2008 | Montpellier (2) | 1–2 | Châteauroux (2) | Montpellier |
| | Compan 44' | Report | Sako 55'; Mulenga 71' | Stadium: Stade de la Mosson; Attendance: 4,336; Referee: Clément Turpin |

| 11 November 2008 | Lyon (1) | 1–3 | Metz (2) | Lyon |
| | Cris 48' | Report | Mendy 21'; Renouard 28'; Rocchi 66' | Stadium: Stade de Gerland; Attendance: 23,053; Referee: Fredy Fautrel |

| 12 November 2008 | Le Havre (1) | 2–1 | Rennes (1) | Le Havre |
| | Nabouhane 15'; Lesage 90+3' (pen.) | Report | Sow 24' | Stadium: Stade Jules Deschaseaux; Attendance: 5,540; Referee: Stéphane Lannoy |

| 12 November 2008 | Paris Saint-Germain (1) | 2–0 | Nancy (1) | Paris |
| | Luyindula 30', 36' | Report | | Stadium: Parc des Princes; Attendance: 15,856; Referee: Stéphane Bré |

=== Quarter-finals ===
| 13 January 2009 | Vannes (2) | 1–1 (a.e.t.) (4–3 p) | Metz (2) | Vannes |
| | Hervé 44' | Report | Bourgeois 50' | Stadium: Stade de la Rabine; Attendance: 3,937; Referee: Thierry Auriac |
| | Penalties |
| | Sammaritano (penalty scored); Diguiny (penalty scored); Lebouc (penalty scored); Quintin (penalty scored) | | (penalty missed) Matheus; (penalty scored) Agouazi; (penalty scored) Delgado; (penalty scored) Bessat; (penalty missed) Renouard |

| 13 January 2009 | Nice (1) | 1–0 | Le Havre (1) | Nice |
| | Kanté 88' | Report | | Stadium: Stade Municipal du Ray; Attendance: 6,020; Referee: Lionel Jaffredo |

| 14 January 2009 | Bordeaux (1) | 2–1 | Châteauroux (2) | Bordeaux |
| | Gouffran 25'; Bellion 57' | Report | Mulenga 80' | Stadium: Stade Chaban Delmas; Attendance: 9,209; Referee: Antony Gautier |

| 14 January 2009 | Paris Saint-Germain (1) | 2–0 | Lens (2) | Paris |
| | Keita 14' (o.g.); Clément 90' | Report | | Stadium: Parc des Princes; Attendance: 32,093; Referee: Fredy Fautrel |

=== Semi-finals ===
| 4 February 2009 | Nice (1) | 1–1 (a.e.t.) (3–4 p) | Vannes (2) | Nice |
| | Ben Saada 88' | Report | Khiter 60' | Stadium: Stade Municipal du Ray; Attendance: 11,357; Referee: Philippe Kalt |
| | Penalties |
| | Rémy (penalty missed); Ben Saada (penalty scored); Hellebuyck (penalty scored); Faé (penalty scored); Rool (penalty missed) | | (penalty scored) Sammaritano; (penalty scored) Hervé; (penalty scored) Talmont; (penalty missed) Quintin; (penalty scored) Bourhani |

| 4 February 2009 | Paris Saint-Germain (1) | 0–3 | Bordeaux (1) | Paris |
| | | Report | Bellion 17'; Diawara 87'; Wendel 90' | Stadium: Parc des Princes; Attendance: 40,543; Referee: Saïd Ennjimi |

=== Final ===
25 April 2009
20:50 CET

| Bordeaux | 4–0 | Vannes |
|---|---|---|
| Wendel 2'; Planus 10'; Gouffran 12'; Gourcuff 40' | Report |

Stade de France, Saint-Denis
Attendance: 75,000
Referee: Fredy Fautrel

=== Topscorer ===
Madjid Bouabdellah (3 goals)

== See also ==
- 2008–09 Ligue 1
- 2008–09 Ligue 2
- 2008–09 Championnat National
