= Tristan Boubaya =

French footballer (born 1989)

Personal information
- Date of birth: 2 October 1989 (age 37)
- Place of birth: Léhon, France
- Height: 1.88 m (6 ft 2 in)
- Position: Midfielder

Team information
- Current team: Vannes

Youth career
- Nantes

Senior career*
Years	Team	Apps	(Gls)
2009–2012	Carquefou	66	(6)
2012–2013	Épinal	27	(1)
2014–2014	Fontenay	26	(4)
2014–2016	Les Herbiers	50	(8)
2016–2017	Saint-Malo	28	(2)
2017–2020	Lorient B	73	(8)
2018–2020	Lorient	1	(0)
2020–2022	Concarneau	56	(2)
2022–2023	Le Mans	33	(1)
2023–	Vannes	9	(3)
- * Club domestic league appearances and goals as of 2 December 2023

Tristan Boubaya (born 2 October 1989) is a French professional footballer who plays as a midfielder for fifth-tier Championnat National 3 club Vannes.

== Career ==
Boubaya was part of the Nantes academy. He went on to play in the third and fourth tiers for Carquefou, Épinal, Fontenay, Les Herbiers, and Saint-Malo before signing with the reserve team of Lorient in the Championnat National 2 in August 2017. He would eventually be made captain of the reserve team.

Boubaya made his first team debut for Lorient in a 1–0 Coupe de la Ligue win over Valenciennes on 14 August 2018. He played in his only Ligue 2 match with the club on 8 February 2019, a late substitute appearance against Grenoble.

In May 2020, Boubaya signed with Championnat National side Concarneau. In May 2022, he agreed to join Le Mans in the summer.

On 27 June 2023, Boubaya signed with Vannes.

== Personal life ==
Boubaya was born in France, and is of mixed French and Algerian descent.
