= Christian Gourcuff =

French football manager (born 1955)

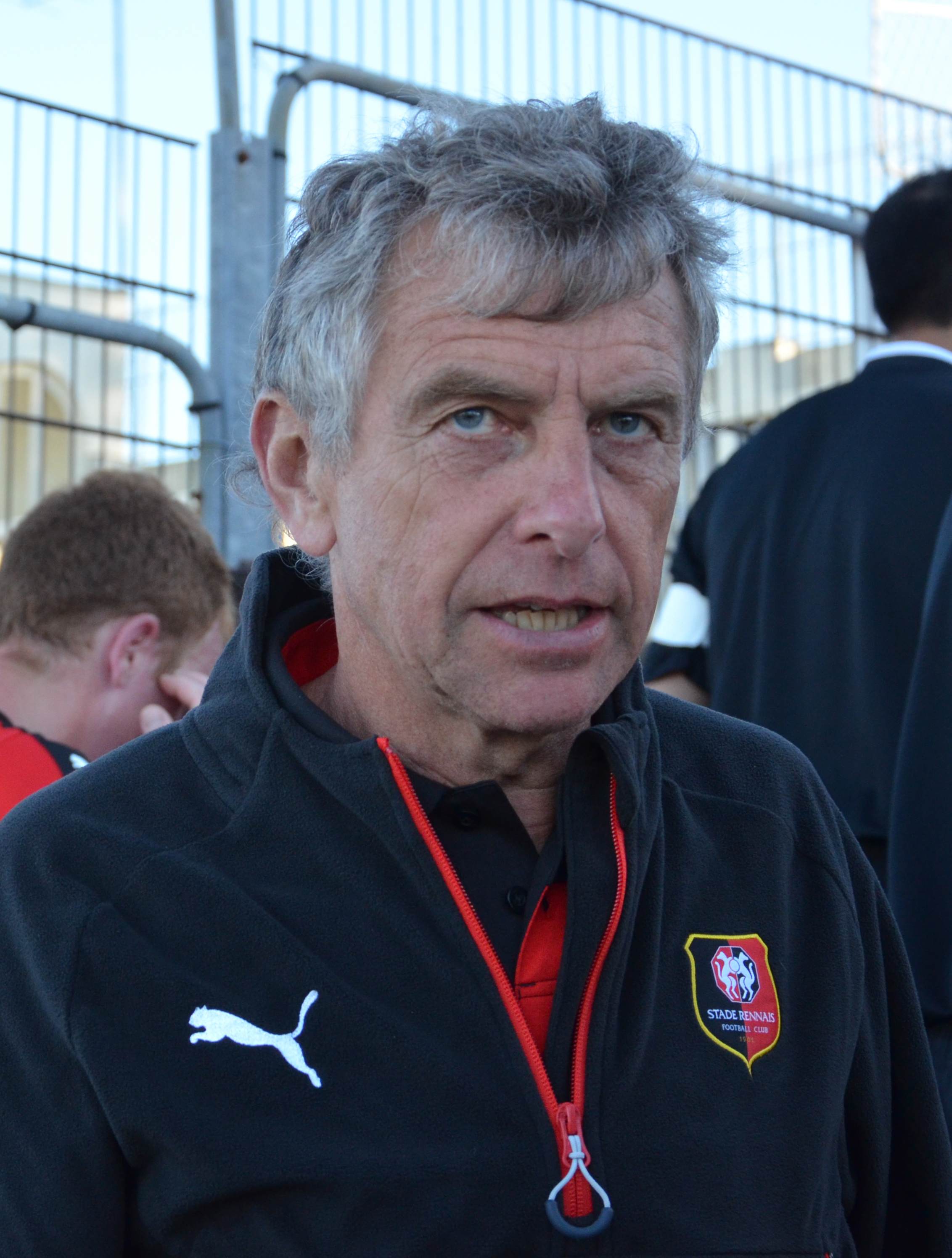
- Gourcuff as manager of Rennes in 2016

Personal information
- Full name: Christian Jean Gourcuff
- Date of birth: 5 April 1955 (age 71)
- Place of birth: Hanvec, Finistère, France
- Position: Midfielder

Senior career*
Years	Team	Apps	(Gls)
1972–1974	Rennes		
1974–1978	US Berné		
1978–1980	Guingamp	40	(0)
1980–1981	Rouen	28	(0)
1981–1982	La Chaux-de-Fonds		
1982–1986	Lorient		
1986–1989	Le Mans		
1989	Montreal Supra	6	(0)

International career
1988	Brittany	1	(0)

Managerial career
- 1982–1986: Lorient
- 1986–1989: Le Mans
- 1989–1991: Pont-l'Abbé
- 1991–2001: Lorient
- 2001–2002: Rennes
- 2002–2003: Al-Ittihad
- 2003–2014: Lorient
- 2014–2016: Algeria
- 2016–2017: Rennes
- 2018–2019: Al-Gharafa
- 2019–2020: Nantes
- * Club domestic league appearances and goals

Christian Jean Gourcuff (born 5 April 1955) is a French former professional football player and manager. He spent a majority of his managerial career at Lorient, where he was the head coach for 25 years across three different spells.

== Club career ==
During his playing career, Gourcuff played as a midfielder for Rennes, US Berné, Guingamp, Rouen, La Chaux-de-Fonds, Lorient, Le Mans and Montreal Supra.

== International career ==
Gourcuff played one match for the Brittany regional team in 1988. It was an indoor game against the United States, and the final score was 6–2 in favor of Brittany.

== Managerial career ==
Becoming a player-manager at the age of 27, Gourcuff coached Lorient, Le Mans, Pont-l'Abbé, Rennes and Al-Ittihad.

On 4 August 2014, Gourcuff was officially unveiled as the new head coach of the Algeria national team, taking over the vacant spot left by the departure of Vahid Halilhodžić. On 3 February 2015, Gourcuff was given a new deal despite Algeria's quarter-final exit at the Africa Cup of Nations.

In the 2018–19 season, Gourcuff was the head coach of Qatari club Al-Gharafa.

== Personal life ==
His son, Yoann, is also a professional footballer who represented France at the 2010 FIFA World Cup.

== Managerial statistics ==
As of match played 6 December 2020

Managerial record by team and tenure
Team	From	To	Record				
Team	From	To	G	W	D	L	Win %
Lorient	1 July 1982	1 July 1986	125	64	26	35	51.20
Le Mans	1 July 1986	1 January 1989	83	37	21	25	44.58
Pont-L'Abbé	1 September 1989	1 July 1991	52	15	12	25	28.85
Lorient	1 July 1991	1 July 2001	404	166	109	129	41.09
Rennes	1 July 2001	1 July 2002	44	17	8	19	38.64
Al-Ittihad	1 July 2002	30 June 2003	21	9	9	3	42.86
Lorient	1 July 2003	25 May 2014	465	168	138	159	36.13
Algeria	1 August 2014	3 April 2016	21	13	3	5	61.90
Rennes	17 May 2016	8 November 2017	55	19	17	19	34.55
Al-Gharafa	19 May 2018	3 June 2019	33	13	8	12	39.39
Nantes	8 August 2019	8 December 2020	44	16	7	21	36.36
Total			1,347	537	358	452	39.87

== Honours ==
Orders

- Knight of the Legion of Honour: 2013

== See also ==
- List of football managers with the most matches
