= Pierre Talmont =

French footballer (born 1977)

Personal information
- Full name: Pierre Talmont
- Date of birth: 2 April 1977 (age 49)
- Place of birth: Vannes, France
- Height: 1.80 m (5 ft 11 in)
- Position: Defender

Team information
- Current team: Vannes (head coach)

Senior career*
| Years | Team | Apps | (Gls) |
| 1998–2000 | Vannes | 32 | (5) |
| 2000–2003 | Brest | 78 | (1) |
| 2003–2004 | Gap | 33 | (3) |
| 2004–2006 | Bayonne | 71 | (2) |
| 2006–2009 | Vannes | 66 | (2) |
| 2009–2013 | Laval | 128 | (4) |
| 2013–2014 | Vendée Poiré-sur-Vie | 10 | (0) |
| Total | | 418 | (17) |

Managerial career
- 2015–2021: Saint-Colomban Locminé
- 2021–: Vannes
- * Club domestic league appearances and goals

Pierre Talmont (born 2 April 1977) is a French former professional footballer who played as a defender and became a coach after retiring as a player. He was appointed head coach of Vannes OC in June 2021, after six seasons with Saint-Colomban Sportive Locminé.

Talmont previously played for Vannes OC in Ligue 2. (Note: Pierre Talmont – French league stats at LFP – also available in French (archived)) With Vannes he also played in the final of the 2008–09 Coupe de la Ligue.

== Honours ==
Vannes

- Coupe de la Ligue: runner-up 2008–09
