= Denis Goavec =

French footballer (born 1957)

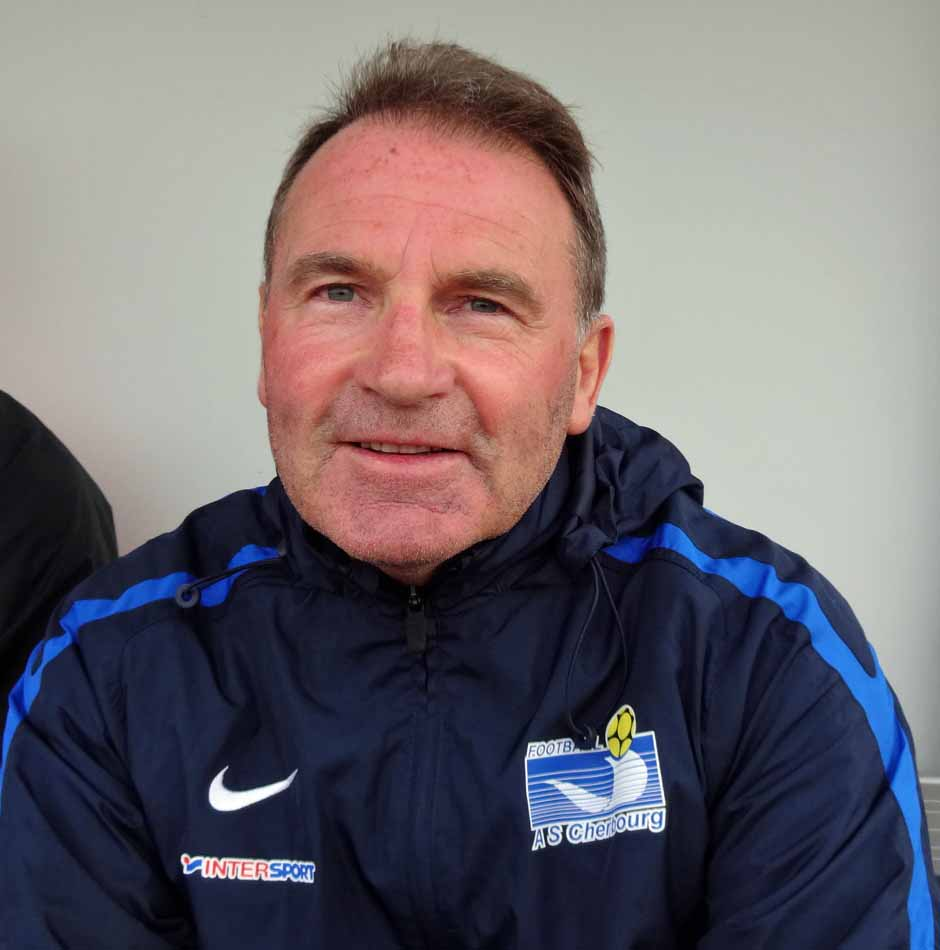
- Denis Gaovec in 2013

Personal information
- Date of birth: September 15, 1957 (age 69)
- Place of birth: Toulon, France
- Height: 1.64 m (5 ft 5 in)
- Position: Midfielder

Senior career*
Years	Team	Apps	(Gls)
1976–1977	ES Viry-Châtillon		
1977–1980	Brest		
1980–1982	Blois Football 41		
1982–1988	Montceau		
1988–1992	Stade Briochin		

Managerial career
- 1988–1995: Stade Briochin
- 1995–1997: Brest
- 1999–2000: Angers
- 2001–2002: Vannes
- 2002–2003: Reims
- 2005–2007: Stade Briochin
- 2009–2010: AC Arles (assistant)
- 2010–2011: Benin
- 2011: Boulogne (assistant)
- 2011–2012: AS Vita Club
- 2013–2014: AS Cherbourg
- 2014: MC El Eulma
- 2014–2015: JS Saoura
- 2015–2017: AS Kaloum Star
- * Club domestic league appearances and goals

Denis Goavec (born September 15, 1957) is a French former football player and manager who played as a midfielder.
