= Vannes OC =

French football club, based in Vannes

- Full name: Vannes Olympique Club
- Nickname: The White-Blacks
- Founded: 1998; 28 years ago
- Ground: Stade de la Rabine
- Capacity: 9,500
- President: Maxime Ray
- Manager: Pierre Talmont
- League: National 2 Group E
- 2022–23: National 1 Group A, 14th (relegated)
- Website: vannesoc.com
Home colours	Away colours	Third colours

Vannes Olympique Club (Breton: Klub Olimpek Gwened; commonly referred to as simply Vannes) is a French professional football club based in Vannes, Brittany. The club was formed in 1998 as a result of the merger of Véloce vannetais founded in 1911 and FC Vannes known before 1991 as UCK Vannes founded in 1946 and currently competing in Championnat National 2, the fifth level of French football. Vannes plays its home matches at the Stade de la Rabine, located within the city.

In 2002, the club hired Stéphane Le Mignan as manager, reaching the quarter-finals of the Coupe de France in 2007, the Championnat National title in 2008, the Coupe de la Ligue final in 2009 and three seasons of Ligue 2 from 2008 to 2011. He was dismissed in 2012 and the club filed for bankruptcy in 2014, reforming in the seventh tier and achieving three promotions in four years.

== History ==
In November 2002, after dismissing Denis Goavec, Vannes hired recently retired player Stéphane Le Mignan as manager. The team achieved promotion from the fourth-tier Championnat de France Amateur to the Championnat National under him in 2005. In the 2006–07 Coupe de France, Vannes won 2–0 after extra time in the last 16 away to Ligue 2 team Montpellier, then lost 5–0 at Ligue 1 Marseille in the quarter-finals.

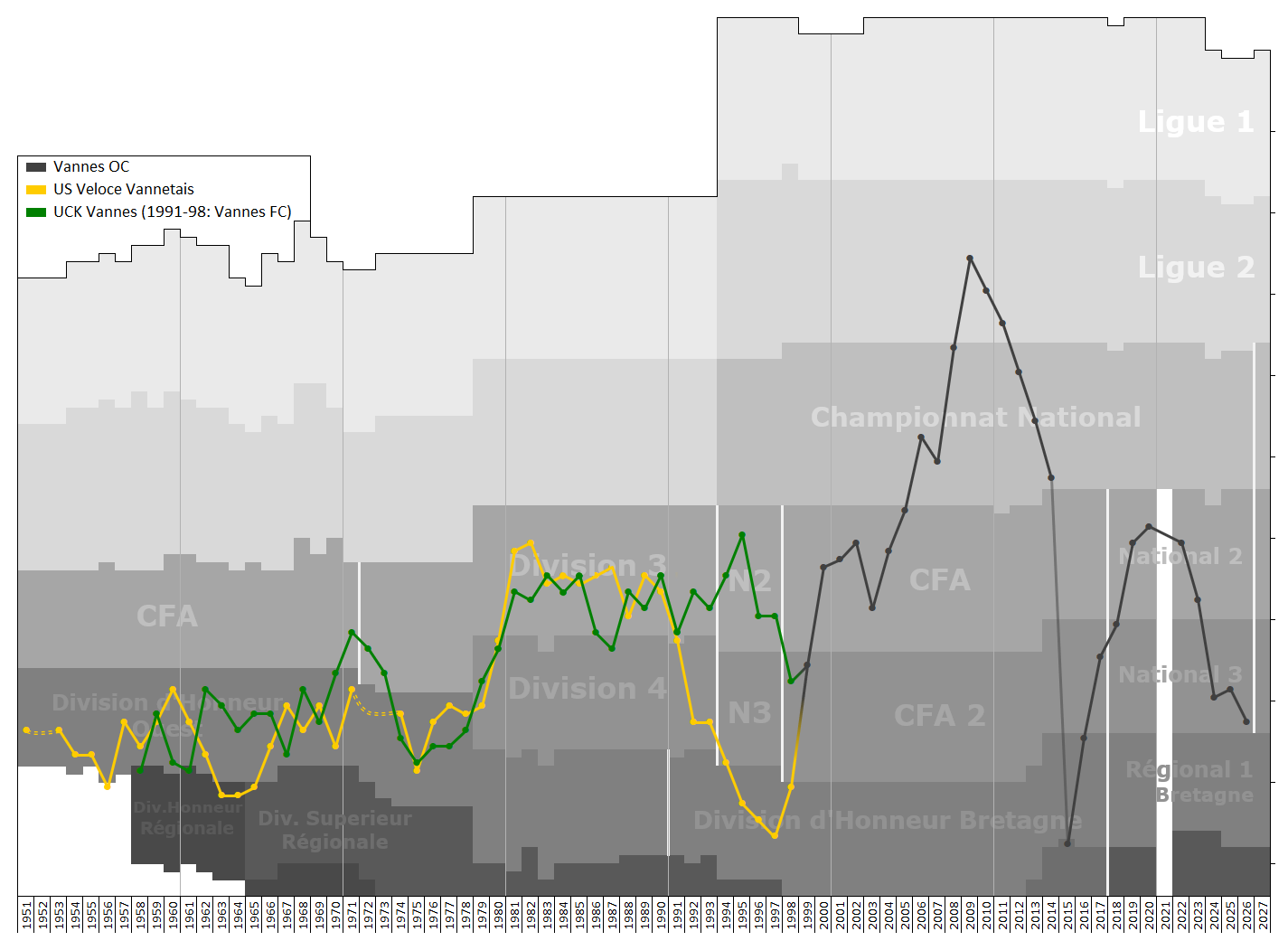
Historical league performance chart of Vannes OC

Vannes won the 2007–08 Championnat National to earn promotion to Ligue 2 for the first time. This also meant a debut campaign in the Coupe de la Ligue, beating top-flight Valenciennes, Auxerre and Nice before a 4–0 final loss to Bordeaux at the Stade de France. In the 2010–11 Ligue 2, the team were relegated in 18th place on the final day, and the budget for the following season was thereby reduced from €8.5 million to €4 million, resulting in 14 players being released. On 27 December 2012, after over a decade in charge, Le Mignan was dismissed with the team 7th in the third tier, six points off Poiré-sur-Vie in third.

In June 2014, after narrowly avoiding relegation from the third tier, Vannes filed for bankruptcy, reforming in the Brittany Region Division Supérieure Elite in the seventh. The team won the regional Division d'Honneur in 2016 to reach the fifth level and return to national football, winning the renamed Championnat National 3 in 2017–18. In 2022–23, the team were relegated back with three games to play, following a 4–2 loss at Rouen.

== Players ==
=== Current squad ===
As of 18th May 2025

Note: Flags indicate national team as defined under FIFA eligibility rules; some limited exceptions apply. Players may hold more than one non-FIFA nationality.

No.	Pos.	Nation	Player
—	GK	FRA	Matteo Petitgenet
—	GK	FRA	Thomas Ecalard
—	DF	FRA	Mathis Guillemot
—	DF	FRA	Nathan Roselier
—	DF	FRA	Nicolas Flegeau
—	DF	CMR	Calvin Mangan
—	DF	FRA	Baptiste Kerviche
—	DF	FRA	Tom Clemence
—	DF	FRA	Thibault Bouedec
—	DF	FRA	Emmanuel Amanakow
—	DF	GAB	Pluvain Nakassila
—	MF	ALG	Tristan Boubaya
—	MF	GLP	Taylor Salibur

No.	Pos.	Nation	Player
—	MF	SEN	Abdou Rahmane Thior
—	MF	FRA	Hugo Le Bolloch
—	MF	FRA	Julien Clemandot
—	MF	FRA	Baptise Bourles
—	MF	FRA	Vincent Morhan
—	FW	MTQ	Loick Piquionne
—	FW	FRA	Antoine Le Bigaut
—	FW	FRA	Victor Fablet
—	FW	FRA	Evan Vallot

=== Notable players ===
For a list of former Vannes players, see Category:Vannes OC players.

- (France) Georginio Rutter (youth)
- (France) Adrien Thomasson

== Honours ==
- Coupe de la Ligue
  - Runners-up: 2008–09
- Championnat National
  - Winners: 2007–08
- Championnat de France Amateur
  - Winners: 2004–05
- Division d'Honneur (Brittany)
  - Winners: 1998, 2016
- Division Supérieure Elite (Brittany)
  - Winners: 2015
