= 2008–09 FC Girondins de Bordeaux season =

Bordeaux
2008–09 season
- President: Jean-Louis Triaud
- Head coach: Laurent Blanc
- Stadium: Stade Chaban-Delmas
- Ligue 1: 1st (champions)
- Coupe de France: Round of 64
- Coupe de la Ligue: Winners
- Trophée des Champions: Winners
- Champions League: Group stage
- UEFA Cup: Round of 32
- Top goalscorer: League: Fernando Cavenaghi; Marouane Chamakh (13 each); All: Fernando Cavenaghi; Marouane Chamakh; Yoann Gourcuff (14 each)
Home colours	Away colours	Third colours

The 2008–09 season was the 119th season in the existence of FC Girondins de Bordeaux and the club's 18th consecutive season in the top flight of French football. In addition to the domestic league, Bordeaux participated in this season's editions of the Coupe de France, the Coupe de la Ligue, the Trophée des Champions, the UEFA Champions League, and the UEFA Cup.

== Players ==
=== First-team squad ===
Note: Flags indicate national team as defined under FIFA eligibility rules; some limited exceptions apply. Players may hold more than one non-FIFA nationality.

No.	Pos.	Nation	Player
1	GK	FRA	Kévin Olimpa
3	DF	BRA	Carlos Henrique
4	MF	FRA	Alou Diarra
5	MF	BRA	Fernando Menegazzo
6	DF	FRA	Franck Jurietti
7	MF	FRA	Yoan Gouffran
8	MF	FRA	Yoann Gourcuff (on loan from Milan)
9	FW	ARG	Fernando Cavenaghi
10	FW	BRA	Jussiê
11	FW	FRA	David Bellion
13	DF	ARG	Diego Placente
14	DF	SEN	Souleymane Diawara

No.	Pos.	Nation	Player
16	GK	FRA	Ulrich Ramé (captain)
17	MF	BRA	Wendel
19	MF	FRA	Pierre Ducasse
21	DF	FRA	Mathieu Chalmé
24	MF	MLI	Abdou Traoré
25	FW	FRA	Henri Saivet
27	DF	FRA	Marc Planus
28	DF	FRA	Benoît Trémoulinas
29	FW	MAR	Marouane Chamakh
30	GK	FRA	Mathieu Valverde
33	MF	FRA	Grégory Sertic
40	GK	FRA	Gilles Meslien

=== Out on loan ===
Note: Flags indicate national team as defined under FIFA eligibility rules; some limited exceptions apply. Players may hold more than one non-FIFA nationality.

No.	Pos.	Nation	Player
--	FW	MLI	Cheik Diabaté (at Ajaccio)
--	DF	FRA	Ted Lavie (at Angers)
--	MF	TOG	Floyd Ayité (at Angers)

No.	Pos.	Nation	Player
--	MF	FRA	Wilfried Moimbé (at Reims)
26	FW	FRA	Gabriel Obertan (at Lorient)
23	DF	FRA	Florian Marange (at Le Havre)

== Competitions ==
=== Overview ===
Competition	First match	Last match	Starting round	Final position	Record							
Competition	First match	Last match	Starting round	Final position	Pld	W	D	L	GF	GA	GD	Win %
Ligue 1	9 August 2008	30 May 2009	Matchday 1	Winners	38	24	8	6	64	34	+30	63.16
Coupe de France	3 January 2009		Round of 64	Round of 64	1	0	0	1	0	1	−1	0.00
Coupe de la Ligue	11 November 2008	25 April 2009	Round of 16	Winners	4	4	0	0	13	3	+10	100.00
Trophée des Champions	2 August 2008		Final	Winners	1	0	1	0	0	0	+0	0.00
Champions League	16 September 2008	9 December 2008	Group stage	Group stage	6	2	1	3	5	11	−6	33.33
UEFA Cup	18 February 2009	26 February 2009	Round of 32	Round of 32	2	0	1	1	3	4	−1	0.00
Total					52	30	11	11	85	53	+32	57.69

Source: Soccerway

=== Trophée des Champions ===
2 August 2008 Final	Lyon	0–0 (4–5 p)	Bordeaux	Bordeaux
17:55 CEST (UTC+2)				Stadium: Stade Chaban-Delmas; Attendance: 27,167; Referee: Bertrand Layec
	Penalties
	Benzema (penalty scored); Bodmer (penalty scored); Källström (penalty scored); Govou (penalty missed); Grosso (penalty missed); Toulalan (penalty scored); Cris (penalty missed)		(penalty missed) Cavenaghi; (penalty scored) Fernando; (penalty scored) Wendel; (penalty missed) Bellion; (penalty scored) Gourcuff; (penalty scored) Jurietti; (penalty scored) Diawara

=== Ligue 1 ===
==== League table ====
Pos	Team	Pld	W	D	L	GF	GA	GD	Pts	Qualification or relegation
1	Bordeaux (C)	38	24	8	6	64	34	+30	80	Qualification to Champions League group stage
2	Marseille	38	22	11	5	67	35	+32	77	Qualification to Champions League group stage
3	Lyon	38	20	11	7	52	29	+23	71	Qualification to Champions League play-off round
4	Toulouse	38	16	16	6	45	27	+18	64	Qualification to Europa League play-off round
5	Lille	38	17	13	8	51	39	+12	64	Qualification to Europa League third qualifying round

Source: Ligue 1
Rules for classification: 1) points; 2) goal difference; 3) number of goals scored.
France's third UEFA Europa League spot went to Ligue 2 side Guingamp, winners of 2008–09 Coupe de France.
(C) Champions

==== Results summary ====
Overall								Home						Away					
Pld	W	D	L	GF	GA	GD	Pts	W	D	L	GF	GA	GD	W	D	L	GF	GA	GD
38	24	8	6	64	34	+30	80	14	5	0	36	12	+24	10	3	6	28	22	+6

Source: Ligue 1

==== Results by round ====
Round	1	2	3	4	5	6	7	8	9	10	11	12	13	14	15	16	17	18	19	20	21	22	23	24	25	26	27	28	29	30	31	32	33	34	35	36	37	38
Ground	H	A	H	A	H	A	H	A	H	A	H	A	H	A	H	A	H	A	A	H	A	H	A	H	A	H	A	H	A	H	A	H	A	H	A	H	H	A
Result	W	L	W	L	D	W	D	W	W	D	W	L	W	L	D	D	W	W	W	W	W	D	L	D	D	W	L	W	W	W	W	W	W	W	W	W	W	W
Position	4	11	3	7	10	6	7	5	4	4	2	3	3	6	6	5	4	3	2	2	2	2	2	5	5	4	5	4	3	3	3	2	2	2	2	1	1	1

Source: Ligue 1
A = Away; H = Home; W = Win; D = Draw; L = Loss

==== Matches ====
The league fixtures were announced on 23 May 2008.

9 August 2008 1	Bordeaux	2–1	Caen	Bordeaux
21:00 CEST (UTC+2)	Gourcuff 55'; Cavenaghi 80'		Nivet 14'	Stadium: Stade Chaban-Delmas; Attendance: 29,002; Referee: Philippe Kalt

16 August 2008 2	Paris Saint-Germain	1–0	Bordeaux	Paris
21:00 CEST (UTC+2)	Hoarau 53'			Stadium: Parc des Princes; Attendance: 41,575; Referee: Alain Hamer

24 August 2008 3	Bordeaux	2–0	Nantes	Bordeaux
21:00 CEST (UTC+2)	Cavenaghi 5' (pen.); Fernando 86'			Stadium: Stade Chaban-Delmas; Attendance: 29,748; Referee: Stéphane Bre

31 August 2008 4	Lille	2–1	Bordeaux	Villeneuve-d'Ascq
17:00 CEST (UTC+2)	Bastos 31'; Obraniak 75'		Cavenaghi 28'	Stadium: Stadium Lille Métropole; Attendance: 14,600; Referee: Jean-Charles Cailleux

13 September 2008 5	Bordeaux	1–1	Marseille	Bordeaux
21:00 CEST (UTC+2)	Chamakh 25'		Koné 2'	Stadium: Stade Chaban-Delmas; Attendance: 32,854; Referee: Bertrand Layec

20 September 2008 6	Grenoble	0–1	Bordeaux	Grenoble
19:00 CEST (UTC+2)			Jussiê 81'	Stadium: Stade des Alpes; Attendance: 19,019; Referee: Damien Ledentu

28 September 2008 7	Bordeaux	1–1	Saint-Étienne	Bordeaux
21:00 CEST (UTC+2)	Cavenaghi 57'		Payet 27'	Stadium: Stade Chaban-Delmas; Attendance: 23,191; Referee: Saïd Ennjimi

4 October 2008 8	Lorient	1–2	Bordeaux	Lorient
19:00 CEST (UTC+2)	Ciani 58'		Fernando 66', 69'	Stadium: Stade du Moustoir; Attendance: 11,279; Referee: Philippe Kalt

18 October 2008 9	Bordeaux	2–1	Toulouse	Bordeaux
19:00 CEST (UTC+2)	Gourcuff 29'; Bellion 40'		Capoue 90+2'	Stadium: Stade Chaban-Delmas; Attendance: 27,740; Referee: Hervé Piccirillo

25 October 2008 10	Nice	2–2	Bordeaux	Nice
19:00 CEST (UTC+2)	Mouloungui 84'; Rémy 90' (pen.)		Wendel 10'; Cavenaghi 58' (pen.)	Stadium: Stade du Ray; Attendance: 12,612; Referee: Tony Chapron

28 October 2008 11	Bordeaux	4–0	Le Havre	Bordeaux
21:00 CEST (UTC+2)	Bellion 30', 47'; Cavenaghi 72'; Wendel 80'			Stadium: Stade Chaban-Delmas; Attendance: 21,990; Referee: Lionel Jaffredo

1 November 2008 12	Nancy	1–0	Bordeaux	Tomblaine
19:00 CET (UTC+1)	Hadji 68'			Stadium: Stade Marcel Picot; Attendance: 18,618; Referee: Stéphane Lannoy

8 November 2008 13	Bordeaux	2–0	Auxerre	Bordeaux
19:00 CET (UTC+1)	Cavenaghi 70'; Chamakh 75'			Stadium: Stade Chaban-Delmas; Attendance: 22,335; Referee: Jean-Charles Cailleux

16 November 2008 14	Lyon	2–1	Bordeaux	Lyon
21:00 CET (UTC+1)	Benzema 33'; Källström 38'		Cavenaghi 80'	Stadium: Stade de Gerland; Attendance: 36,341; Referee: Bertrand Layec

22 November 2008 15	Bordeaux	1–1	Rennes	Bordeaux
19:00 CET (UTC+1)	Gourcuff 60'		Thomert 20'	Stadium: Stade Chaban-Delmas; Attendance: 25,213; Referee: Thierry Auriac

29 November 2008 16	Sochaux	0–0	Bordeaux	Montbéliard
21:00 CET (UTC+1)				Stadium: Stade Auguste-Bonal; Attendance: 13,843; Referee: Alain Hamer

5 December 2008 17	Bordeaux	2–1	Valenciennes	Bordeaux
19:00 CET (UTC+1)])	Chamakh 35'; Cavenaghi 47'		Pujol 42'	Stadium: Stade Chaban-Delmas; Attendance: 18,717; Referee: Alexandre Castro

13 December 2008 18	Le Mans	1–3	Bordeaux	Le Mans
19:00 CET (UTC+1)	Helstad 67'		Cavenaghi 59'; Chalmé 76'; Jussiê 90+4'	Stadium: Stade Léon-Bollée; Attendance: 10,499; Referee: Saïd Ennjimi

21 December 2008 19	Monaco	3–4	Bordeaux	Bordeaux
21:00 CET (UTC+1)	Pino 13'; Licata 43', 50'		Chamakh 52', 87'; Diarra 67'; Cavenaghi 89'	Stadium: Stade Chaban-Delmas; Attendance: 8,142; Referee: Laurent Duhamel

11 January 2009 20	Bordeaux	4–0	Paris Saint-Germain	Bordeaux
21:00 CET (UTC+1)	Diawara 10'; Cavenaghi 35'; Gourcuff 70'; Fernando 87'			Stadium: Stade Chaban-Delmas; Attendance: 31,910; Referee: Stéphane Lannoy

17 January 2009 21	Nantes	1–2	Bordeaux	Nantes
21:00 CET (UTC+1)	Đorđević 89'		Gourcuff 89'; Chamakh 70'	Stadium: Stade de la Beaujoire; Attendance: 26,008; Referee: Bruno Coué

1 February 2009 22	Bordeaux	2–2	Lille	Bordeaux
17:00 CET (UTC+1)	Bellion 17'; Gourcuff 65'		Obraniak 49'; Rami 57'	Stadium: Stade Chaban-Delmas; Attendance: 28,137; Referee: Laurent Duhamel

8 February 2009 23	Marseille	1–0	Bordeaux	Marseille
21:00 CET (UTC+1)	Chamakh 57' (o.g.)			Stadium: Stade Vélodrome; Attendance: 53,856; Referee: Stéphane Bré

14 February 2009 24	Bordeaux	1–1	Grenoble	Bordeaux
19:00 CET (UTC+1)	Chamakh 59'		Cesar 76'	Stadium: Stade Chaban-Delmas; Attendance: 21,392; Referee: Philippe Kalt

22 February 2009 25	Saint-Étienne	1–1	Bordeaux	Saint-Étienne
17:00 CET (UTC+1)	Matuidi 54'		Cavenaghi 90'	Stadium: Stade Geoffroy-Guichard; Attendance: 27,048; Referee: Thierry Auriac

1 March 2009 26	Bordeaux	1–0	Lorient	Bordeaux
17:00 CET (UTC+1)	Chamakh 49'			Stadium: Stade Chaban-Delmas; Attendance: 22,670; Referee: Hervé Piccirillo

7 March 2009 27	Toulouse	3–0	Bordeaux	Toulouse
19:00 CET (UTC+1)	Sirieix 32'; Gignac 44'; Sissoko 90+3'			Stadium: Stadium de Toulouse; Attendance: 30,152; Referee: Bertrand Layec

14 March 2009 28	Bordeaux	2–1	Nice	Bordeaux
21:00 CET (UTC+1)	Chamakh 18'; Henrique 48'		Bamogo 23' (pen.)	Stadium: Stade Chaban-Delmas; Attendance: 25,054; Referee: Philippe Malige

21 March 2009 29	Le Havre	0–3	Bordeaux	Le Havre
19:00 CET (UTC+1)			Gourcuff 12'; Diawara 58'; Wendel 89'	Stadium: Stade Jules Deschaseaux; Attendance: 14,363; Referee: Ruddy Buquet

4 April 2009 30	Bordeaux	1–0	Nancy	Bordeaux
19:00 CEST (UTC+2)	Chamakh 88'			Stadium: Stade Chaban-Delmas; Attendance: 26,825; Referee: Bruno Coué

11 April 2009 31	Auxerre	0–2	Bordeaux	Auxerre
19:00 CEST (UTC+2)			Frenando 34'; Wendel 80'	Stadium: Stade de l'Abbé-Deschamps; Attendance: 20,002; Referee: Didier Falcone

19 April 2009 32	Bordeaux	1–0	Lyon	Bordeaux
21:00 CEST (UTC+2)	Diarra 42'			Stadium: Stade Chaban-Delmas; Attendance: 32,858; Referee: Stéphane Bré

29 April 2009 33	Rennes	2–3	Bordeaux	Rennes
20:00 CEST (UTC+2)	Danzé 1'; Sow 89'		Gouffran 62'; Gourcuff 70', 90+2'	Stadium: Stade de la Route de Lorient; Attendance: 26,079; Referee: Laurent Duhamel

3 May 2009 34	Bordeaux	3–0	Sochaux	Bordeaux
21:00 CEST (UTC+2)	Sertic 7'; Gourcuff 15'; Chamakh 90+4'			Stadium: Stade Chaban-Delmas; Attendance: 27,133; Referee: Stéphane Lannoy

13 May 2009 35	Valenciennes	1–2	Bordeaux	Valenciennes
19:00 CEST (UTC+2)	Danic 21' (pen.)		Fernando 38'; Gourcuff 83'	Stadium: Stade Nungesser; Attendance: 15,104; Referee: Tony Chapron

16 May 2009 36	Bordeaux	3–2	Le Mans	Bordeaux
21:00 CEST (UTC+2)	Chamakh 38'; Gourcuff 45'; Planus 75'		Le Tallec 24', 55'	Stadium: Stade Chaban-Delmas; Attendance: 32,722; Referee: Clément Turpin

23 May 2009 37	Bordeaux	1–0	Monaco	Bordeaux
21:00 CEST (UTC+2)	Chamakh 35'			Stadium: Stade Chaban-Delmas; Attendance: 32,620; Referee: Thierry Auriac

30 May 2009 38	Caen	0–1	Bordeaux	Caen
21:00 CEST (UTC+2)			Gouffran 48'	Stadium: Stade Michel d'Ornano; Attendance: 20,924; Referee: Stéphane Lannoy

=== Coupe de France ===
3 January 2009 Round of 64	Bordeaux	0–1	Saint-Étienne	Bordeaux
21:00 CET (UTC+1)			Gomis 74'	Stadium: Stade Chaban-Delmas; Attendance: 12,272; Referee: Stéphane Bré

=== Coupe de la Ligue ===
11 November 2008 Round of 16	Bordeaux	4–2	Guingamp	Bordeaux
19:00 CET (UTC+1)	Trémoulinas 13'; Obertan 23', 31'; Cavenaghi 78' (pen.)		Eduardo 33' (pen.), 44'	Stadium: Stade Chaban-Delmas; Attendance: 13,995; Referee: Laurent Duhamel

14 January 2009 Quarter-finals	Bordeaux	2–1	Châteauroux	Bordeaux
18:45 CET (UTC+1)	Gouffran 25'; Bellion 57'		Mulenga 80'	Stadium: Stade Chaban-Delmas; Attendance: 9,209; Referee: Antony Gautier

4 February 2009 Semi-finals	Paris Saint-Germain	0–3	Bordeaux	Paris
20:45 CET (UTC+1)			Bellion 17'; Diawara 88'; Wendel 90+1'	Stadium: Parc des Princes; Attendance: 40,543; Referee: Saïd Ennjimi

25 April 2009 Final	Bordeaux	4–0	Vannes	Saint-Denis
20:50 CEST (UTC+2)	Wendel 3'; Planus 10'; Gouffran 13'; Gourcuff 40'			Stadium: Stade de France; Attendance: 75,828; Referee: Fredy Fautrel

=== UEFA Champions League ===
==== Group stage ====
The group stage draw was held on 28 August 2008.

Pos	Team	Pld	W	D	L	GF	GA	GD	Pts	Qualification	ROM	CHE	BOR	CLJ
1	(Italy) Roma	6	4	0	2	12	6	+6	12	Advance to knockout phase	—	3–1	2–0	1–2
2	(England) Chelsea	6	3	2	1	9	5	+4	11	Advance to knockout phase	1–0	—	4–0	2–1
3	(France) Bordeaux	6	2	1	3	5	11	−6	7	Transfer to UEFA Cup	1–3	1–1	—	1–0
4	(Romania) CFR Cluj	6	1	1	4	5	9	−4	4		1–3	0–0	1–2	—

Source: RSSSF

16 September 2008 1	Chelsea (England)	4–0	(France) Bordeaux	London, England
20:45 CEST (UTC+2)	Lampard 14'; J. Cole 30'; Malouda 82'; Anelka 90+2'	Report		Stadium: Stamford Bridge; Attendance: 39,635; Referee: Pieter Vink (Netherlands)

1 October 2008 2	Bordeaux (France)	1–3	(Italy) Roma	Bordeaux, France
20:45 CEST (UTC+2)	Gourcuff 18'	Report	Vučinić 64'; Baptista 71', 83'	Stadium: Stade Chaban-Delmas; Attendance: 26,920; Referee: Alberto Undiano Mallenco (Spain)

22 October 2008 3	Bordeaux (France)	1–0	(Romania) CFR Cluj	Bordeaux, France
20:45 CEST (UTC+2)	Cadú 54' (o.g.)	Report		Stadium: Stade Chaban-Delmas; Attendance: 26,213; Referee: Ivan Bebek (Croatia)

4 November 2008 4	CFR Cluj (Romania)	1–2	(France) Bordeaux	Cluj-Napoca, Romania
21:45 EET (UTC+2)	Dani 9'	Report	Gourcuff 6'; Wendel 38'	Stadium: Stadionul Dr. Constantin Rădulescu; Attendance: 19,380; Referee: Massimo Busacca (Switzerland)

26 November 2008 5	Bordeaux (France)	1–1	(England) Chelsea	Bordeaux, France
20:45 CET (UTC+1)	Diarra 83'	Report	Anelka 60'	Stadium: Stade Chaban-Delmas; Attendance: 32,486; Referee: Frank De Bleeckere (Belgium)

9 December 2008 6	Roma (Italy)	2–0	(France) Bordeaux	Rome, Italy
20:45 CET (UTC+1)	Brighi 61'; Totti 79'	Report		Stadium: Stadio Olimpico; Attendance: 38,926; Referee: Herbert Fandel (Germany)

=== UEFA Cup ===
==== Final phase ====
===== Round of 32 =====
18 February 2009 First leg	Bordeaux (France)	0–0	(Turkey) Galatasaray	Bordeaux, France
20:45 CET (UTC+1)		Report		Stadium: Stade Chaban-Delmas; Attendance: 21,813; Referee: Claudio Circhetta (Switzerland)

26 February 2009 Second leg	Galatasaray (Turkey)	4–3 (4–3 agg.)	(France) Bordeaux	Istanbul, Turkey
19:30EET (UTC+2)	Turan 42', 65'; Kewell 45'; Sarıoğlu 90'	Report	Bellion 1'; Chamakh 73'; Cavenaghi 75'	Stadium: Ali Sami Yen Stadium; Attendance: 19,000; Referee: Craig Thomson (Scotland)
