= 2008 Trophée des Champions =

- Event: Trophée des Champions
Lyon	Bordeaux
0	0
- Bordeaux won 5–4 on penalties
- Date: 2 August 2008
- Venue: Stade Chaban-Delmas, Bordeaux, France
- Referee: Bertrand Layec
- Attendance: 27,167

The 2008 Trophée des Champions Final was a football match that saw the 2007–08 Ligue 1 and Coupe de France champions Lyon face off against Bordeaux. Since Lyon won both the league and the Coupe de France, they faced the club that finished in second place in Ligue 1, Bordeaux.

The match was held on 2 August 2008 at the Stade Chaban-Delmas in Bordeaux. After the score finished in a 0–0 draw after 90 minutes, Bordeaux ended Lyon's streak of six-straight Trophée des Champions titles by defeating them 5–4 on penalties.

== Match details ==
2 August 2008
17:55 CET

Lyon	0–0	Bordeaux
	Report
Penalties
Benzema (penalty scored); Bodmer (penalty scored); Källström (penalty scored); Govou (penalty missed); Grosso (penalty missed); Toulalan (penalty scored); Cris (penalty missed)	4–5	(penalty missed) Cavenaghi; (penalty scored) Fernando; (penalty scored) Wendel; (penalty missed) Bellion; (penalty scored) Gourcuff; (penalty scored) Jurietti; (penalty scored) Diawara

Stade Chaban-Delmas, Bordeaux
Attendance: 27,167
Referee: Bertrand Layec

Lyon	Bordeaux

LYON:
GK	1	(France) Hugo Lloris
RB	20	(France) Anthony Réveillère
CB	3	(Brazil) Cris (c)
CB	5	(France) Mathieu Bodmer	(yellow card) 45'
LB	11	(Italy) Fabio Grosso
CM	17	(Cameroon) Jean Makoun
CM	28	(France) Jérémy Toulalan	(yellow card) 38'
RM	14	(France) Sidney Govou
LM	19	(Argentina) César Delgado		(substituted off) 86'
AM	18	(Bosnia and Herzegovina) Miralem Pjanić		(substituted off) 72'
FW	10	(France) Karim Benzema
Substitutes:
GK	30	(France) Rémy Vercoutre
DF	32	(France) Jean-Alain Boumsong
DF	2	(France) François Clerc
MF	6	(Sweden) Kim Källström		(substituted on) 86'
FW	29	(France) Yannis Tafer
FW	34	(France) Jérémy Pied
FW	21	(Czech Republic) Milan Baroš		(substituted on) 72'
Manager:
(France) Claude Puel

BORDEAUX:
GK	16	(France) Ulrich Ramé (c)
LB	6	(France) Franck Jurietti
CB	3	(Brazil) Henrique	(yellow card) 87'
CB	14	(Senegal) Souleymane Diawara
RB	21	(France) Mathieu Chalmé
DM	4	(France) Alou Diarra		(substituted off) 70'
CM	5	(Brazil) Fernando	(yellow card) 85'
RM	17	(Brazil) Wendel
LM	7	(France) Yoan Gouffran		(substituted off) 74'
FW	29	(Morocco) Marouane Chamakh		(substituted off) 84'
FW	8	(France) Yoann Gourcuff
Substitutes:
GK	30	(France) Mathieu Valverde
DF	27	(France) Marc Planus
DF	28	(France) Benoît Trémoulinas
MF	19	(France) Pierre Ducasse
FW	26	(France) Gabriel Obertan		(substituted on) 74'
FW	9	(Argentina) Fernando Cavenaghi		(substituted on) 70'
FW	11	(France) David Bellion		(substituted on) 84'
Manager:
(France) Laurent Blanc

MATCH OFFICIALS

- Assistant referees:
  - Mickaël Annonier
  - Tugdual Philippe
- Fourth official: Lionel Jaffredo

MAN OF THE MATCH

MATCH RULES

- 90 minutes.
- Penalty shoot-out if scores level after 90 minutes.
- Seven named substitutes
- Maximum of 3 substitutions.

== See also ==
- 2008–09 Ligue 1
- 2008–09 Coupe de France
- 2008–09 FC Girondins de Bordeaux season
- 2008–09 Olympique Lyonnais season
