= Fernando Cavenaghi =

Argentine footballer (born 1983)

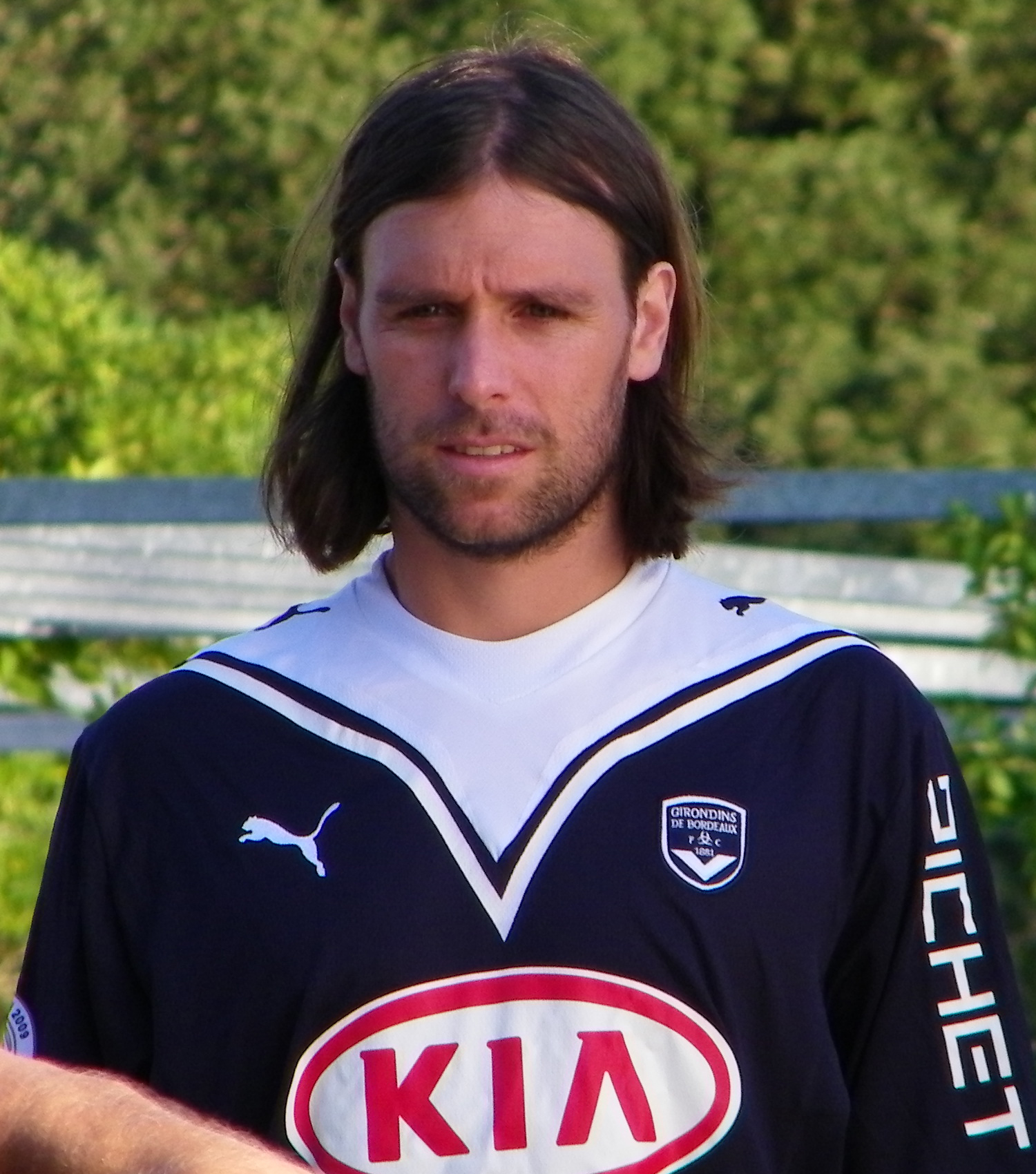
- Cavenaghi with Girondins de Bordeaux in 2009

Personal information
- Full name: Fernando Ezequiel Cavenaghi
- Date of birth: 21 September 1983 (age 43)
- Place of birth: O'Brien, Argentina
- Height: 1.81 m (5 ft 11 in)
- Position: Striker

Senior career*
Years	Team	Apps	(Gls)
2001–2004	River Plate	88	(55)
2004–2007	Spartak Moscow	51	(12)
2007–2011	Bordeaux	83	(33)
2010	→ Mallorca (loan)	11	(2)
2011	→ Internacional (loan)	2	(1)
2011–2012	River Plate	37	(19)
2012–2013	Villarreal	18	(4)
2013–2014	Pachuca	21	(4)
2014–2015	River Plate	41	(21)
2015–2016	APOEL	18	(19)
Total		382	(181)

International career
2003	Argentina U20	12	(11)
2008	Argentina	4	(0)
- * Club domestic league appearances and goals

Fernando Ezequiel Cavenaghi (Spanish pronunciation: [kaβeˈnaɣi]; born 21 September 1983) is a retired Argentine professional footballer. He played as a striker who was efficient in front of goal with either foot and from any range. More recently, in 2021, Cavenaghi was the co-owner, along with Alejandro Domínguez, of Uruguayan football club Racing Club de Montevideo, until 2023 when the club was sold to Bayern Munich.

He spent most of his career with River Plate in three separate spells, playing 210 games and scoring 112 goals, while winning honours including the 2014 Copa Sudamericana and the 2015 Copa Libertadores. Abroad, he had his best successes with Bordeaux, whom he helped win a Ligue 1 title and two each of the Coupe de la Ligue and Trophée des Champions. He also had short spells in Spain, Brazil, Mexico and Cyprus, finishing as the Cypriot First Division's top scorer as APOEL won it in his final year as a professional.

Cavenaghi was part of the Argentina under-20 team that won the 2003 South American Youth Championship, finishing as its top scorer with eight goals. In the same year, he was part of the team that reached the semi-finals at the FIFA U-20 World Cup, and was joint top scorer with four goals. He earned four caps for the senior team in 2008.

== Club career ==
=== River Plate ===
Born in O'Brien, Buenos Aires Province, Cavenaghi played for Rivadavia de Chacabuco and Bravado in the regional leagues between the ages of nine and twelve.

Cavenaghi made his professional debut for River Plate in the 2000–01 season in which he scored one goal in five appearances. In his first full season he scored 17 goals in 23 appearances, including a hat-trick against Estudiantes.

=== Spartak Moscow ===
In July 2004, Cavenaghi moved abroad for the first time, joining Spartak Moscow for a fee of US$12 million, then a record for a Russian team. He failed to adapt to Russian football, and was frozen out of the team following the arrival of manager Vladimir Fedotov in April 2006, whom he publicly criticised for his tactics. He was put up for sale that December.

=== Girondins de Bordeaux ===
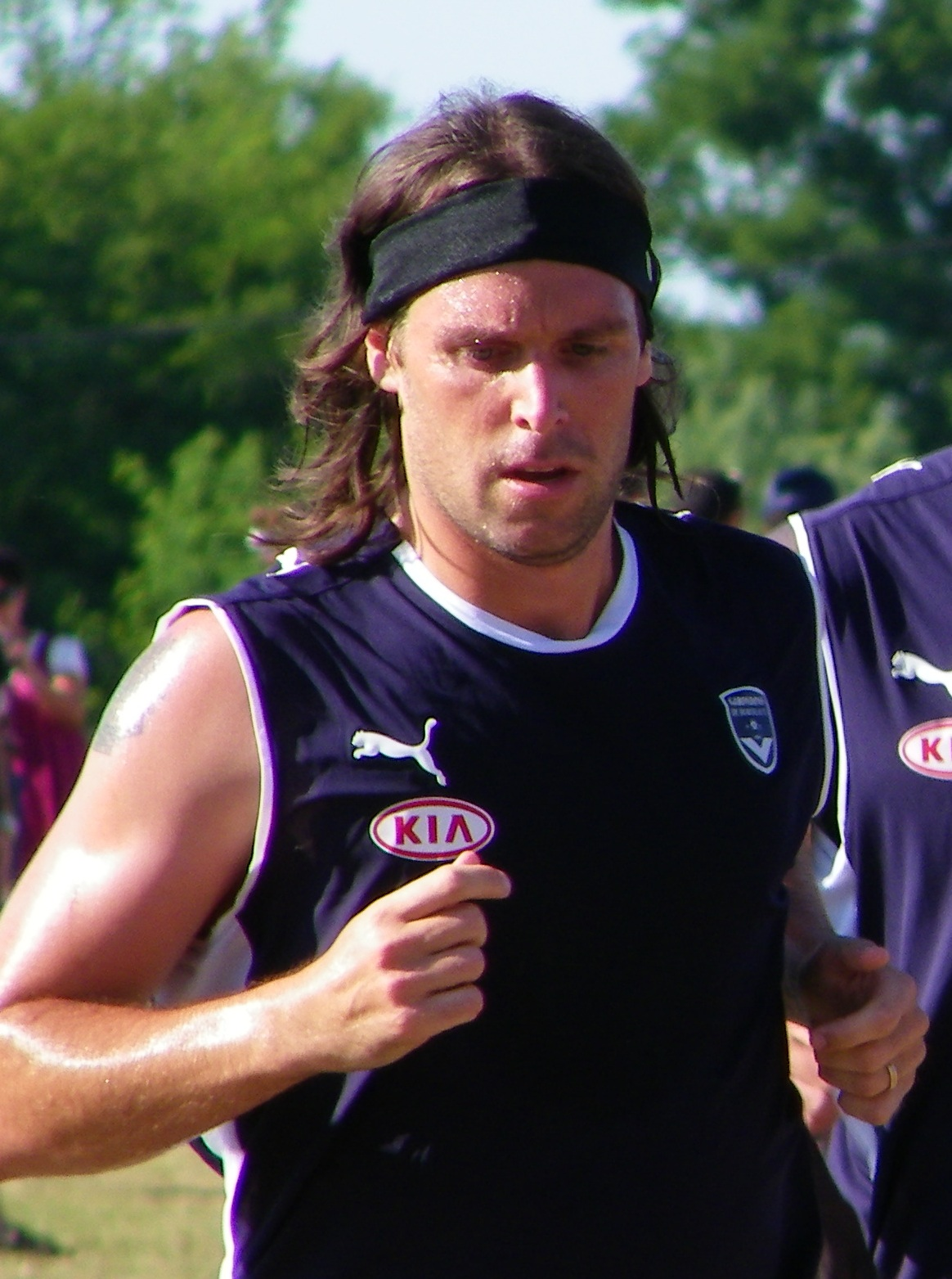
Cavenaghi training with Bordeaux

On 22 January 2007, Cavenaghi was sold to French club Bordeaux. He signed a four-and-a-half-year deal for a €7 million fee. Through an Italian passport earned by his ancestry, he could work freely in the European Union. On 3 February he played his first Ligue 1 match against Nice. In his first season, Bordeaux won the Coupe de la Ligue with a 1–0 win over Lyon in the final, with Cavenaghi an unused substitute. During the 2007–08 season he scored 22 goals in 35 appearances for Bordeaux.

In the 2008 Trophée des Champions, Cavenaghi came on as a 70th-minute substitute for Alou Diarra in a goalless draw against Lyon at the Stade Chaban-Delmas. Though both he and David Bellion had their attempts saved by Grégory Coupet in the penalty shootout, Bordeaux were victorious. In the 2008–09 Ligue 1 season Cavenaghi helped Bordeaux to its first league title in ten years, scoring 13 goals in 29 league matches. The team also won the Coupe de la Ligue in the same season, with Cavenaghi scoring in a 4–2 home win over Guingamp in the last 16. The Girondins won their third honour of the calendar year on 25 July 2009 as they retained the Trophée des Champions with a 2–0 win over Guingamp in Montreal, Cavaneghi scoring the opening goal for Laurent Blanc's team.

Cavenaghi signed for Spanish club Mallorca on 26 August 2010 a season-long loan with the option to purchase for €3.5 million. He scored six goals in 13 total games for the Balearic club, all in the form of braces against Real Sociedad in La Liga, and Sporting Gijón and Almería in the Copa del Rey.

In January 2011 Cavenaghi joined Brazil's Internacional on a year-long loan, with option to make it permanent for €2.5 million.

=== Return to River Plate ===
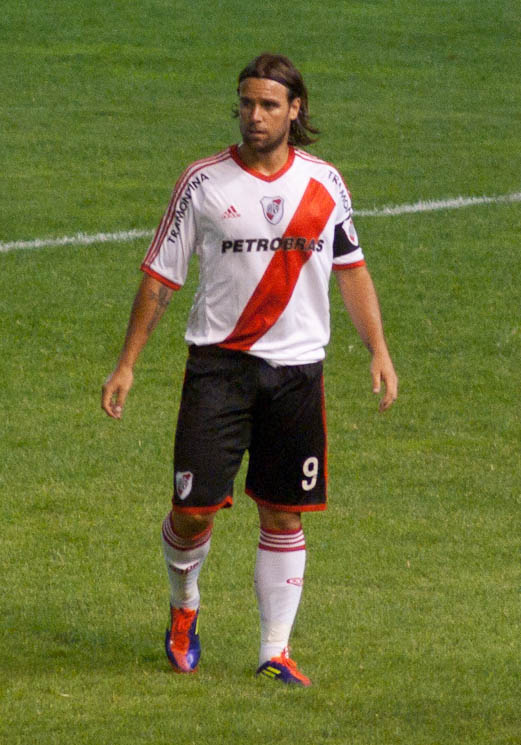
Cavenaghi playing for River Plate in 2012

In July 2011, after leaving his contract at Bordeaux a year early, Cavenaghi returned to River Plate. He was appointed captain of the club, who had been relegated. He scored 19 goals in 37 league matches that season, including a notable performance against Gimnasia de Jujuy where he scored four goals. In his one-season back he helped the club capture the 2011-12 Primera B Nacional and gain promotion back to the first division.

=== Villarreal ===
Cavenaghi returned to Spain in August 2012 by signing for Villarreal, who themselves had fallen into the Segunda División. On his debut on 17 August, he scored in each half of a 2–1 win over Real Madrid Castilla at the Estadio El Madrigal. He totalled 19 appearances and four goals for the "Yellow Submarine", but cut his stay short in January 2013 Cavenaghi when he signed for Pachuca of the Mexican Liga MX.

=== Third stint at River Plate ===
In early 2014, Cavenaghi joined River Plate for the third time. He would wear his number 9 throughout his 3rd stay. River Plate became Champion in Argentina's Primera División 2014, making them eligible to several continental/international tournaments in 2014–15.

As captain, Cavenaghi led River Plate in achieving a sweep of all three international championships: 2014 Copa Sudamericana, 2015 Recopa Sudamericana and the 2015 Copa Libertadores. River is the only club in CONMEBOL to hold all three titles at one time. In these campaigns, los millonarios knocked out their arch-rival Boca Juniors, first in the semi-finals of the 2014 Copa Sudamericana and later in the infamous pepper spray incident in the round of 16 of the 2015 edition of the Copa Libertadores. He was the second-highest scorer in Argentina's Primera División 2015 with 11 goals.

=== APOEL and retirement ===
On 25 August 2015, Cavenaghi moved back to Europe signing a two-year contract with Cypriot First Division club APOEL FC. Five days later, he scored twice on his debut in a 6–2 home victory against Pafos FC for the Cypriot First Division. He scored in each of his first seven league appearances, totalling twelve goals in that sequence. He helped APOEL to win the Cypriot First Division title, and despite playing his last match on 10 February 2016, missing the last three months of the season due to his injury, he also won the top goalscorer award with 19 goals in only 18 league appearances.

Cavenaghi appeared in 26 matches and scored 23 goals in all competitions with APOEL, before a serious knee injury forced him to mutually terminate his contract with the club on 2 April 2016, as his recovery from the knee surgery was estimated to take more than eight months to complete. His serious knee injury eventually forced Cavenaghi to retire from the professional scene, making the official announcement through a YouTube video on 27 December 2016 at River Plate's El Monumental in Buenos Aires.

== International career ==
In December 2002, manager Hugo Tocalli named Cavenaghi in the Argentina under-20 team for the 2003 South American U-20 Championship in Uruguay. He was top scorer with eight goals – four in each stage – as the Argentines won the title, and scored the only one against Colombia on 28 January to seal the Championship.

In October, Cavenaghi was again called up by Tocalli for the squad at the 2003 FIFA U-20 World Cup in the United Arab Emirates. In the last 16 against Egypt in Dubai, he scored both goals, including the golden goal, in a 2–1 victory. He scored a golden goal again in the quarter-finals against the United States in Abu Dhabi. Argentina finished fourth and Cavenaghi was one of four top scorers with four goals apiece, though the Golden Shoe award went to Eddie Johnson of the United States.

However, due to not being released by River Plate for the 2004 CONMEBOL Pre-Olympic Tournament, Cavenaghi would not get any chances with Marcelo Bielsa. He had then the fifth better goal average in River Plate history, very close to Alfredo Di Stéfano, but he missed the 2004 Summer Olympics, won by Bielsa's team. Bielsa resigned soon after the gold medal and Cavenaghi got a first chance in Argentina senior team on 29 December, in a non-official match against Catalonia. José Pekerman, the new Argentina coach, used him as a substitute for Diego Milito. The game was a 3–0 win at the Camp Nou.

In March 2008, Cavenaghi's form for Bordeaux earned him a first official call up to the senior national side by Alfio Basile, ahead of a friendly against Egypt on 26 March. He made his debut in the 2–0 win at the Cairo International Stadium as a 69th-minute substitute for Julio Cruz and played three more friendlies that year. He would get just four more caps, saying that "at my best moment in France, I was called up to a few games, but Messi, Agüero and Higuaín were already there and it was very difficult to find a place among these players".

== Personal life ==
Cavenaghi is the oldest of four brothers (Marcos, Belén, and Nicolás) to Edgardo Cavenaghi and Mónica Ferrero and has been a River Plate fan since his infancy. Cavenaghi married his wife, Soledad Gaynor, in 2007 and had his first child, Benjamín, on 2 October 2008. Benjamín currently plays in the youth system of Uruguayan club Deportivo Maldonado and was called up in 2024 to represent Uruguay in the under-17 national team. In 2010, Cavenaghi's daughter, Sofie, was born.

== Career statistics ==
Appearances and goals by club, season and competition
Club	Season	League		Cup		Continental		Total	
Club	Season	Apps	Goals	Apps	Goals	Apps	Goals	Apps	Goals
River Plate	2000–01	5	1	—		3	2	8	3
River Plate	2001–02	23	17	—		6	2	29	19
River Plate	2002–03	33	20	—		11	7	44	27
River Plate	2003–04	27	17	—		11	6	38	23
River Plate	Total	88	55	—		31	17	119	72
Spartak Moscow	2004	9	1			—		9	1
Spartak Moscow	2005	25	6	1	1	—		26	7
Spartak Moscow	2006	17	5			4	0	21	5
Spartak Moscow	Total	51	12	1	1	4	0	56	13
Bordeaux	2006–07	9	2			—		9	2
Bordeaux	2007–08	23	15	5	2	7	5	35	22
Bordeaux	2008–09	29	13	2	1	5	1	36	15
Bordeaux	2009–10	20	3	3	4	3	0	26	7
Bordeaux	2010–11	2	0	—		—		2	0
Bordeaux	Total	83	33	10	7	15	6	108	46
Mallorca (loan)	2010	11	2	2	4	—		13	6
Internacional (loan)	2011	8 (Note: Six appearances, one goal in 2011 Campeonato Gaúcho)	2	7	4	4	0	25	6
River Plate	2011–12	37	19	1	0	—		38	19
Villarreal	2012–13	18	4	1	0	—		19	4
Pachuca	2012–13	10	2	3	3	—		13	5
Pachuca	2013–14	11	2	3	1	—		14	3
Pachuca	Total	21	4	6	4	—		27	8
River Plate	2013–14	19	8	0	0	—		19	8
River Plate	2014	3	2	0	0	3	0	6	2
River Plate	2015	18	11	2	0	7	0	27	11
River Plate	Total	40	21	2	0	10	0	52	21
APOEL	2015–16	18	19	3	2	5	2	26	23
Career total		376	171	33	22	69	25	477	219

== Honours ==
River Plate

- Argentina Primera Division: 2002 Clausura, 2003 Clausura, 2004 Clausura, 2014 Final
- Primera B Nacional: 2011–12
- Copa Campeonato: 2013–14
- Copa Sudamericana: 2014
- Recopa Sudamericana: 2015
- Copa Libertadores: 2015

Internacional

- Campeonato Gaúcho: 2011

Bordeaux

- Ligue 1: 2008–09
- Trophée des Champions: 2008, 2009
- Coupe de la Ligue: 2006–07, 2008–09

APOEL

- Cypriot First Division: 2015–16

Argentina U20

- South American Youth Championship: 2003

Individual

- South American U-20 Championship Golden Shoe: 2003
- Argentine Primera División top scorer: 2001–02 Clausura
- Cypriot First Division top scorer: 2015–16
