= Anita Garibaldi (disambiguation) =

Anita Garibaldi (1821–1849) was a Brazilian republican revolutionary and the wife of Italian revolutionary Giuseppe Garibaldi

Anita Garibaldi may also refer to:

- Anita Garibaldi (miniseries), a 2012 Italian television miniseries
- Anita Garibaldi, Santa Catarina, a municipality in the state of Santa Catarina, Brazil
- Anita e Garibaldi, a 2013 Brazilian film directed by Alberto Rondalli
- Red Shirts (film), also known as Anita Garibaldi, a 1952 French-Italian film
