= Pierre Ducasse =

Pierre Ducasse may refer to:

- Pierre Ducasse (footballer) (born 1987), French footballer
- Pierre Ducasse (politician) (born 1972), Canadian politician
