= Alou Diarra =

French footballer (born 1981)

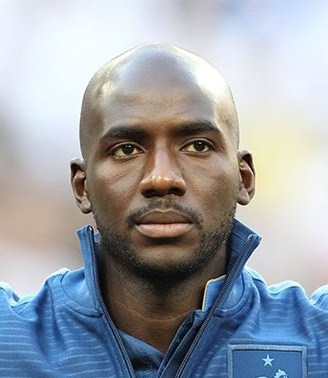
- Diarra with France at the UEFA Euro 2012

Personal information
- Full name: Alou Diarra
- Date of birth: 15 July 1981 (age 45)
- Place of birth: Villepinte, France
- Height: 1.90 m (6 ft 3 in)
- Position: Defensive midfielder

Team information
- Current team: Queens Park Rangers (assistant manager)

Youth career
- 1987–1993: Aulnay-sous-Bois
- 1993–1997: Villepinte
- 1997–1999: Louhans-Cuiseaux

Senior career*
Years	Team	Apps	(Gls)
1999–2000	Louhans-Cuiseaux	3	(0)
2000–2002	Bayern Munich II	41	(5)
2000–2002	Bayern Munich	0	(0)
2002–2005	Liverpool	0	(0)
2002–2003	→ Le Havre (loan)	25	(0)
2003–2004	→ Bastia (loan)	35	(4)
2004–2005	→ Lens (loan)	34	(2)
2005–2006	Lens	32	(2)
2006–2007	Lyon	15	(1)
2007–2011	Bordeaux	133	(11)
2011–2012	Marseille	34	(2)
2012–2014	West Ham United	6	(0)
2013	→ Rennes (loan)	12	(0)
2015–2016	Charlton Athletic	44	(1)
2016–2017	Nancy	18	(2)
Total		432	(30)

International career
2001–2002	France U20	5	(0)
2002–2004	France U21	14	(1)
2004–2012	France	44	(0)

Managerial career
- 2019–2020: Lens B (assistant)
- 2020–2022: Lens (assistant)
- 2023–2025: Troyes B
- 2025–: Queens Park Rangers (assistant)
Medal record
Men's football
Representing France
FIFA World Cup
Runner-up	2006
- * Club domestic league appearances and goals

Alou Diarra (born 15 July 1981) is a French professional football coach and former player. Known for his leadership ability, he served as captain of both Bordeaux and the France national team.

Diarra primarily played as a defensive midfielder, but could also deputise as a centre-back if necessary. He was described as a player who is "strong, athletic and very powerful" and possesses a "combative edge" similar to former French international Patrick Vieira.

Diarra began his career playing for clubs based in Seine-Saint-Denis, such as Aulnay and hometown club Villepinte. In 1997, he joined Louhans-Cuiseaux and made his professional debut with the club in the 1999–2000 season while the club was playing in the second division.

In 2000, Diarra was recruited by German club Bayern Munich. He spent two years playing on the club's reserve team, Bayern Munich II. In 2002, he was signed by compatriot Gérard Houllier as part of the manager's French Revolution to play for English club Liverpool. Diarra's stint at the club was deemed a disappointment as he spent both years at the club on loan in France playing for Le Havre, Bastia and Lens.

After a successful 2004–05 season with Lens, Diarra made a permanent return to France joining the club from Liverpool on a permanent deal. He spent two seasons at the club amassing over 70 appearances before signing with the then five-time defending champions Lyon. At Lyon, Diarra struggled for playing time and left the club to join Bordeaux after one year. He did earn a winner's medal as a result of the club winning the 2006–07 Ligue 1 title. With Bordeaux, Diarra was ever-present within the team under manager Laurent Blanc. He was a prominent figure on the Bordeaux team that won the league and league cup double in the 2008–09 season. Diarra has also won two Trophée des champions while playing for the club.

Diarra was also a France international from 2004 until 2012. Prior to playing at senior level, he played at under-20 and under-21 level. With the under-20 team, Diarra played on the team that participated in the 2001 FIFA World Youth Championship. He made his senior international debut in October 2004 in a friendly match against the Republic of Ireland. Diarra has participated in both the 2006 and 2010 editions of the FIFA World Cup. In the 2006 competition, he appeared in a group stage match against Togo and the final match against Italy as a substitute. In the 2010 edition, Diarra captained France for the first time in the team's final group stage match against South Africa.

== Personal life ==
Diarra was born in the commune of Villepinte in the department of Seine-Saint-Denis to Malian parents. He has three younger brothers and one sister. One of his brothers, Zanké, is also a footballer and currently plays for French club Quevilly in the Championnat National, the third division of French football. He had previously played for the reserve team of professional club Paris Saint-Germain, but was released in 2010. Another brother, Idrissa, assists in running a social networking site that helps amateur footballers find a club. Diarra and his siblings were raised in the neighborhood of Rose des Vents located in the nearby commune of Aulnay-sous-Bois, where his parents still reside. He is currently married and has two children. On 28 May 2010, ahead of the 2010 FIFA World Cup, Diarra departed the national team's training camp to be beside his wife as she gave birth to his second child.

== Club career ==
=== Early career ===
Diarra began his football career at hometown club Aulnay. After six years in Aulnay, Diarra moved back to his birth city to join Villepinte. While in the youth academy of Villepinte, he struggled to attract the attention of professional clubs often personally contacting clubs in order to earn trials. Diarra was ultimately denied several opportunities, most notably by Le Mans and, according to his brother, the struggle made the elder Diarra "very motivated to succeed".

In 1997, Diarra was signed to an amateur contract by professional club Louhans-Cuiseaux who were playing in Ligue 2, the second level of French football, and was inserted into the club's youth academy. In the 1998–99 season, Diarra was promoted to the club's reserve team and spent two seasons playing there. In the latter part of the 1999–2000 season, he was called up to the senior team by manager Philippe Hinschberger. On 15 April 2000, Diarra made his professional debut in a 2–1 defeat to Toulouse picking up a yellow card. Two weeks later, he made his first professional start in the team's 3–2 loss to Niort. In his final appearance with Louhans-Cuiseaux, Diarra received his first red card of his career after incurring two yellow card infractions in a 2–1 defeat to Le Mans. Louhans-Cuiseaux finished the campaign in last place and were relegated to the semi-professional Championnat National, the third division of French football. After the season, Louhans-Cuiseaux attempted to tie down Diarra on a long-term deal and offered the player a trainee contract. Diarra refused the deal and was subsequently available to sign with any club on a free transfer.

=== Bayern Munich ===
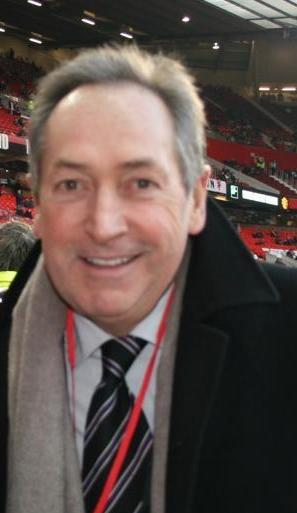
Gérard Houllier recruited Diarra at Liverpool and later managed the player again at Lyon.

During the summer of 2000, Diarra was signed by German club Bayern Munich after the club saw him play one match with Louhans-Cuiseaux. Upon his arrival to the club, he was immediately placed onto the club's reserve team, Bayern Munich II, in the Regionalliga Süd, the (then) third level of German football. Diarra was a regular within the team playing alongside the likes of Owen Hargreaves, Philipp Lahm, Bastian Schweinsteiger and Zvjezdan Misimović. In his first season with the reserve team, he appeared in 28 matches scoring four goals. Diarra's influence in the team was immediate as he scored his first goal for the team in the first league match of the season against VfR Mannheim in a 4–2 defeat. His combative style of play also began to take shape as he collected nine yellow cards during the campaign with seven of them coming in the team's first 17 matches. The season was ultimately a success for Diarra partly due to the player being promoted to the senior team for the 2001–02 season by manager Ottmar Hitzfeld. He was assigned the number 30 shirt.

Diarra began the 2001–02 season by making the bench in several of the team's league matches in August and September, but failing to make an appearance. In October 2001, he was dropped back down to the club's reserve team and appeared in four matches before earning promotion back to the senior team for its 2001 Intercontinental Cup showdown with Argentine club Boca Juniors. Diarra made the bench for the match, but did not feature as Bayern won the match courtesy of an extra time goal from Samuel Kuffour. The victory gave Diarra his first major honour of his career. Afterwards, he returned to the reserve team and later suffered an injury, which required a lengthy absence. Diarra rejoined the team in March 2002 under new manager Hermann Gerland and made nine more appearances. Following the season, Diarra was offered a new three-year contract with the club, but rejected it citing his limited playing time. Despite his disappointing stint with Bayern, which included failing to make an appearance with the club's senior team, in 2009, Diarra stated "I have very fond memories of my time in Bayern". Following Diarra's success at Bordeaux, Bayern's general manager Uli Hoeneß admitted that Diarra's rise to prominence as a footballer is "one of the seven wonders of the world". Hoeneß admitted that he was surprised by Diarra's resurgence, stating: "If somebody had told me [he would return for a UEFA Champions League game] five years ago and made a bet with me, I would have lost a fortune". Since Diarra departing the club in 2002, due to FIFA compensation laws, Bayern have recouped over €800,000 as a result of the player's future transfers.

=== Liverpool ===
On 3 July 2002, English club Liverpool confirmed its interest in signing Diarra under the guidance of manager Gérard Houllier, who had likened the player to Patrick Vieira. Liverpool were also in competition with Italian club Juventus and several French clubs. On 9 July, Liverpool confirmed that the club had signed the player from Bayern Munich. Diarra agreed to a five-year contract and made his club debut against Le Havre during the club's pre-season. A day after the match against Le Havre, it was reported that Diarra was on a verge of a loan move to the same club. On 1 August, the loan was confirmed.

==== Loan stints in France ====
Diarra made his debut for Le Havre on 17 August 2002 in the team's 1–1 draw with Strasbourg appearing as a substitute. He was a frequent starter for the majority of the fall season, but, following the winter break, began appearing primarily as a substitute. In September 2002, Diarra's contract dispute with Louhans-Cuiseaux came into the spotlight after his former club admitted that the player was reportedly banned from playing in France professionally for three years due to moving abroad without Louhans-Cuiseaux receiving a trainers' compensation fee. Louhans-Cuiseaux reported the situation to FIFA, however, the organization ruled in favor of Diarra who was allowed to continue his career with Le Havre. Diarra scored his first professional goal on 25 January 2003 in a 2–1 defeat to Laval in the Coupe de France. He finished the campaign with 28 total appearances.

"Do you see the Liverpool group? They are all internationals or more famous players. I had a long talk with Rafa Benítez and he could not guarantee me a first team place. I didn't want to only play ten games a season."

— Diarra, after his third loan stint to Lens was confirmed.

In the 2003 off-season, Diarra admitted that he would love to return to Liverpool stating "I'm someone who is ambitious and I hope to win my place at Anfield next season". However, in July 2003, Houllier confirmed that Diarra would remain in France on loan, this time with Corsican club Bastia. Upon his arrival to the club, Diarra was inserted as a starter by manager Gérard Gili and paid immediate dividends scoring in back-to-back weeks in a 4–2 win against Guingamp and a 4–1 loss to Auxerre in September. On 7 March 2004, he scored a goal in Bastia's surprising 4–1 win over Marseille. Diarra ultimately finished the campaign with 38 total appearances and four goals. After the season, Diarra returned to Liverpool for pre-season training, however, not under the guidance of his recruiter Houllier, but under Spanish coach Rafael Benítez. As a result, he was, for the third consecutive season, linked with a loan move. His non-inclusion on the club's roster for its North America tour meant a loan move was inevitable and, on 27 July 2004, he was loaned to Lens.

Similar to his stint at Bastia, Diarra was included in the team as a starter by coach Joël Muller. The season was a major success for Diarra as he was the only player in the team to start every league match he played for the club. He also served as captain for a majority of the season. His consistent performances led to his call up to the senior national team. Diarra scored his first goal of the campaign in a 1–1 draw with Ajaccio. He scored the goal in the opening minute of the match. On 6 February 2005, Diarra scored the opener in team's 2–0 win over Paris Saint-Germain at the Parc des Princes. He finished the campaign with 37 total appearances and two goals. Diarra also collected 11 yellow cards.

=== Lens ===
After establishing himself as a premier player in France and an international during the 2004–05 campaign, Benítez declared that Diarra still had a future at Liverpool stating "I think it's still early days for him, but it's good news for us to see a young player doing so well. If he continues to play well for his club and is in the national team, we will be reminding everyone he is our player". However, in April 2005, Diarra revealed that he wanted to stay with Lens for the long-term. After finishing the season, on 24 June 2005, Liverpool granted his request after Lens reached an agreement with the club on a transfer fee, purported to be €3.2 million. Diarra finished his Liverpool career with no first-team appearances and only one club appearance, which came in a pre-season friendly.

Diarra remained a starter at Lens and also retained his consistency appearing in a career-high 44 matches, scoring two goals, and providing four assists. His two goals came in a 2–1 away win over Nancy and a 2–2 draw with Nice. Diarra also played European football for the first time in his career playing in the 2005–06 edition of the UEFA Cup. He made his European debut on 3 July 2005 in a UEFA Intertoto Cup second round tie against Polish club Lech Poznań. Diarra ultimately appeared in ten matches in the club's European campaign as Lens reached the Round of 32 where the club was defeated 3–1 on aggregate by Italian outfit Udinese.

=== Lyon ===
Following the 2006 FIFA World Cup, Diarra was linked with a move to the then five-time defending champions Lyon where he could reunite with former manager Gérard Houllier. On 23 August 2006, the move came to fruition following the departure of Diarra's namesake, Mahamadou, who moved to Spanish club Real Madrid for a fee of €26 million. The transfer fee was priced at €6.25 million and Diarra was assigned the number 18 shirt. Diarra struggled to make an impact at the club as Houllier preferred the younger Jérémy Toulalan and Tiago Mendes as his starting defensive midfielder and box-to-box midfielder, respectively. He made his club debut late in the season on 16 September 2006 in the team's 3–1 away win over Lorient. Diarra scored his first goal for the club on 6 December 2006 in the club's final UEFA Champions League group stage match against Romanian club Steaua București. The match ended in a 1–1 draw. Two weeks later, he scored his second goal in the team's 3–1 win over Nancy in the Coupe de la Ligue quarterfinals.

Following the winter break, Diarra struggled with a thigh injury and didn't appear with the team for almost three months. In March 2007, he finally returned to the team in its 3–1 win over Derby du Rhône rivals Saint-Étienne appearing as a substitute. During the season, Diarra complained twice with regards to playing time, which led to Houllier equivocally questioning Diarra's ego. The feud culminated on 6 April when Houllier dropped Diarra from the squad to face Valenciennes the following day and then ordered him to play for the club's reserve team in the Championnat de France amateur, the fourth level of French football. Diarra refused the orders and Houllier responded by reportedly threatening not to play him for the rest of the season. The Lyon manager later stated the Diarra should issue an apology to him and the team. The defensive midfielder did not budge and, subsequently, missed the team's next four league matches, as well as the 2007 Coupe de la Ligue Final. Diarra returned to the team on 28 April playing the entire match in a 3–1 win over Le Mans. He repeated this feat in three of the team's last five matches as Lyon were crowned champions for the sixth consecutive season. Included in one of those three matches was Diarra's first league goal for the club, which came in a 3–0 victory over his former club Lens.

=== Bordeaux ===
==== 2007–2009 ====
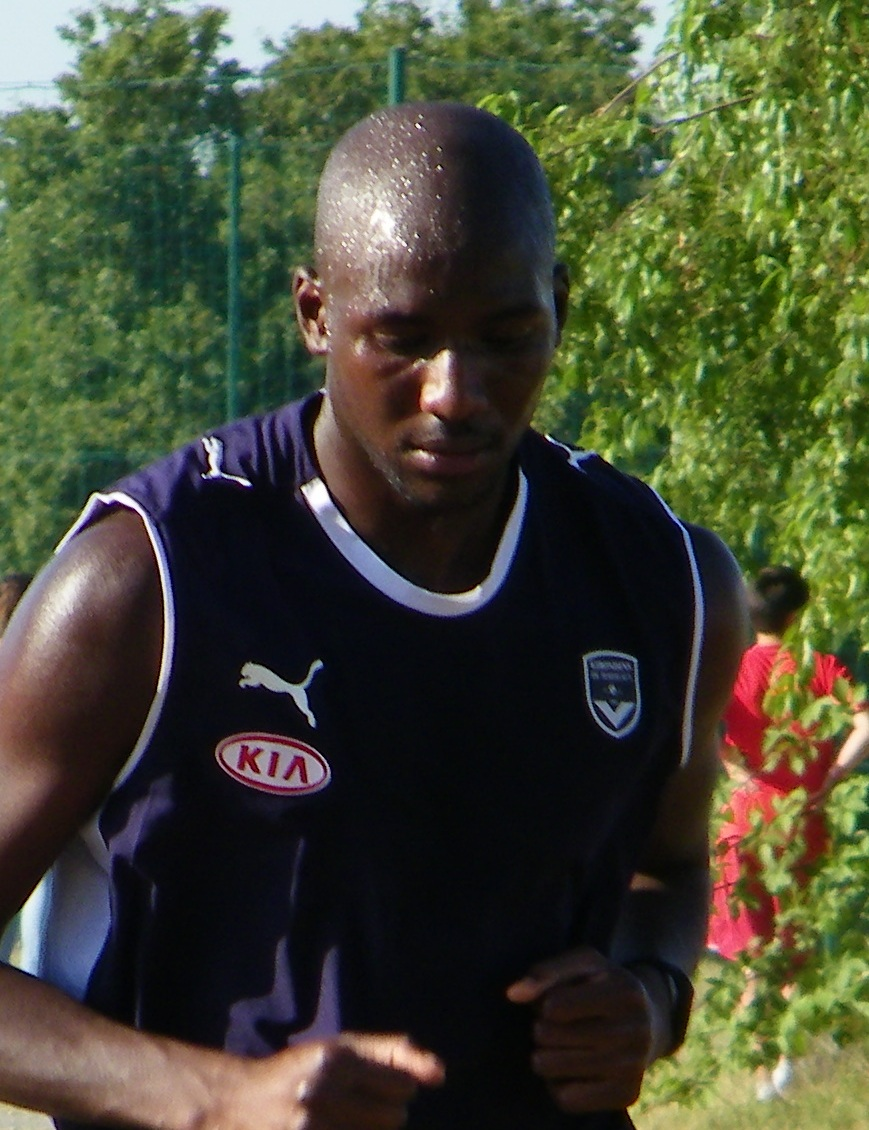
Diarra during a training session with Bordeaux.

After the 2006–07 season with Lyon, Diarra sought to play for another club and was linked primarily to English clubs Manchester City and Portsmouth. In July 2007, Lyon president Jean-Michel Aulas confirmed that the club had accepted a bid of £5 million from Portsmouth. However, Aulas also revealed that Diarra refused the move and preferred to stay in France and join Bordeaux. On 20 July, after a week-long negotiation, Bordeaux confirmed the signing of Diarra. The midfielder signed a four-year contract and the transfer fee was priced at €7.75 million. Diarra stated his primary reason for joining Bordeaux over Portsmouth was because Bordeaux "wants to play for the first positions in Ligue 1 and I am attracted to that". Diarra was signed as a replacement for the departed Rio Mavuba who ventured to Spain. His arrival to the club also coincided with the insertion of former football player Laurent Blanc as manager.

Diarra was assigned the number 4 shirt and made his competitive debut for the club on 4 August 2007 in a 1–0 league win over his former club Lens receiving a yellow card. On 29 August, he scored his first goal for the club in its 1–0 win over Metz. Diarra was a regular within the starting lineup for the entire season starting all 36 league matches he appeared in. He formed excellent midfield partnerships with box-to-box midfielders Alejandro Alonso and Fernando Menegazzo who gave Diarra the freedom to distribute the ball and dismantle impending attacks from the opposition. On 2 December, Diarra scored a goal in Bordeaux's 4–3 win over Derby de la Garonne rivals Toulouse.

Diarra also participated in European competition with Bordeaux during the season. He played in four matches during the club's UEFA Cup campaign. Bordeaux reached the Round of 32 where the club was eliminated by Belgian club Anderlecht on a 3–2 aggregate scoreline. In the Coupe de France, Bordeaux reached the quarter-finals. Diarra appeared in all four matches the team contested, which included playing 120 minutes in back-to-back rounds. He scored two more goals for the club; both of which came in the league in wins over Metz and Rennes. Bordeaux finished the season in second place; four points behind the champions Lyon. It was the closest gap Lyon had endured since the 2003–04 season when the club won the league by three points over Paris Saint-Germain. Diarra finished the season with 44 total appearances and four goals.

In the 2008–09 season, Diarra remained a starter as Bordeaux was boosted by the arrival of the influential Yoann Gourcuff. He appeared in Bordeaux's 5–4 win on penalties in the 2008 Trophée des Champions. Bordeaux capitalized on the momentum by going undefeated in eight of its nine opening league matches. Included in those matches was Diarra's first red card for the club, which came in a 1–0 win over Grenoble after he collected two yellow cards. The two infractions came within a span of five minutes. On 21 December 2008, Diarra scored the second team goal in Bordeaux's 4–3 comeback win over Monaco at the Stade Louis II. Bordeaux had trailed 3–0 with 40 minutes to go in the match. In the Coupe de la Ligue, Bordeaux won the competition. Diarra missed the final match due to injury, but did play in the semi-final match, a 3–0 win over Paris Saint-Germain, that resulted in Bordeaux qualifying for the final. In the 2008–09 edition of the UEFA Champions League, Diarra appeared in all six group stage matches Bordeaux played in and scored a goal against English club Chelsea in a 1–1 draw. The club's third-place finish in its group meant a return to the UEFA Cup where Bordeaux was eliminated in the Round of 32 for the second consecutive season.

On 19 April 2009, Diarra scored the only goal in Bordeaux's 1–0 win over title rivals Lyon at the Stade de Gerland. The victory helped the club create a gap between itself and Lyon. Bordeaux, subsequently, went on a six-match winning streak to close out the season, which resulted in the club capturing the sixth title in its history and its first since 1999. Bordeaux also recorded its second ever double, as a result of its league cup title. Diarra finished the season with a career-high 45 total appearances and three goals.

==== 2009–2011 ====
Ahead of the 2009–10 season, following the replacement of captain Ulrich Ramé as the starting goalkeeper, Blanc tipped Diarra as his replacement to wear the armband. He began the season claiming his fourth silverware with Bordeaux on 25 July 2009, winning the 2009 Trophée des Champions title in a 2–0 victory over Guingamp. In the third match of the league, Diarra scored his first goal of the season in a 3–0 win over Nice. Diarra appeared frequently in the starting lineup during the first half of the campaign, but struggled with injuries through January–March. He missed the first leg of the team's Round of 16 tie with Greek club Olympiacos. In the second leg, Diarra returned to the team, but was ejected from the match in the second half after receiving two yellow card infractions. The ejection meant Diarra would miss the first leg of the team's quarter-final tie with league rivals Lyon. Bordeaux lost the tie 3–2 on aggregate. Diarra returned to league play on 13 March 2010 and played the rest of the league campaign missing only one match. Due to injuries to Gourcuff and the declining form of Marouane Chamakh, Bordeaux suffered a dip in form in the spring season, which resulted in Bordeaux failing defend its title or qualify for European competition.

Prior to the start of the 2010–11 season, Diarra was heavily linked with a move to the champions Marseille. On 14 July, Marseille manager Didier Deschamps confirmed that the club was negotiating with both Diarra and Bordeaux for a transfer. A week later, Bordeaux president Triaud stated that Marseille had failed to meet the player's €7.75 million release clause and that Diarra was likely not going to be leaving the club. Despite Marseille remaining hopeful a deal could go through, on 30 July, a deal was declared dead. Diarra later stated that he was happy to remain at Bordeaux and see out the rest of his contract. The defensive midfielder opened the new campaign scoring two goals in the first six matches of the season in wins over Paris Saint-Germain and Lyon.

"The commission and its president have heard me. I will never do this anymore, that's for sure. This is the last time this will happen. I regret it."

— Diarra, after receiving his six-match suspension by the Ligue de Football Professionnel.

On 16 October 2010, Diarra was involved in a controversial dispute, which resulted in the player being banned from playing league football for six matches. After receiving a yellow card booking from referee Wilfried Bien in the team's 1–0 win over Auxerre, Diarra responded by pushing the referee with both hands. He was immediately shown a red card and dismissed from the match. After walking off the field, Diarra turned back, walked over to Bien and apologized for the confrontation. After the match, Diarra apologized again for the incident. He was supported by his former coach Laurent Blanc who stated that Diarra made a simple mistake that he immediately regretted as soon as he realized what he did. Diarra was initially suspended for three matches, however, following a November tribunal by the Ligue de Football Professionnel, his suspension was upgraded to six matches. Diarra returned to the team on 27 November playing only the first half in the team's 1–1 draw with Lille.

=== Marseille ===
On 4 July 2011, Diarra completed his much-anticipated move from Bordeaux to league rivals Marseille agreeing to a three-year contract. The transfer fee was undisclosed, but is reported to be in the region of €5 million.

=== West Ham United ===
On 10 August 2012, Diarra moved back to England to join West Ham United on a three-year contract, for an undisclosed fee. After joining West Ham United, Diarra said he was delighted to join the club and was looking forward to play in the Premier League. Chairman Vincent Labrune said he had been sold in order to reduce the wage bill.

Diarra made his debut for West Ham on 25 August in a 3–0 away defeat to Swansea City coming on as a 69th-minute substitute for Mohamed Diamé. Having made three appearances, Diarra first team opportunities soon became limited when he suffered thigh strain during training in September. In the January transfer window, Diarra made a request to leave the club and criticised Sam Allardyce for holding him back by not explaining his [Allardyce] team selection. Diarra also said that his time at West Ham United has become a waste of time

After the move, Diarra claimed he was conned when his "well known" agent lied to him to join West Ham United. Diarra criticized West Ham United for his pre-season training schedule, having finished Euro 2012. Despite his comments Diarra returned to West Ham for the beginning of the 2013–14 season. In his second game of the season, a League Cup game against Cheltenham Town, he was carried-off injured after 34 minutes having damaged his anterior cruciate ligament. He was expected to miss the whole of the season due to this injury. Unexpectedly, Diarra returned to fitness in 2013 making his return in a 2–1 away win against Tottenham Hotspur on 18 December 2013 in the League Cup. On 9 July 2014, he left West Ham on a mutual agreement to terminate his remaining one-year deal.

==== Loan move to Rennes ====
On 31 January 2013 (the transfer deadline), Diarra joined Rennes, on loan until the end of season. Several days after returning to France, Diarra made his debut, coming on as a substitute and providing assist for debutant Axel Ngando, who scored his first goal for the club to settle a draw with Lorient. Diarra made twelve appearances before returning to West Ham United after manager Frédéric Antonetti publicity criticised him, claiming "he has not been able to give all that he could give".

=== Charlton Athletic ===
On 23 February 2015, Diarra signed a deal with Championship side Charlton Athletic to last until the end of the season and scored his first goal in a 2–1 loss to rivals Millwall. He later signed an extension till the summer of 2016, with the option of an extra year. On 1 September 2016, Diarra's contract with Charlton was cancelled by mutual consent and on account of wanting to go back to France with his family.

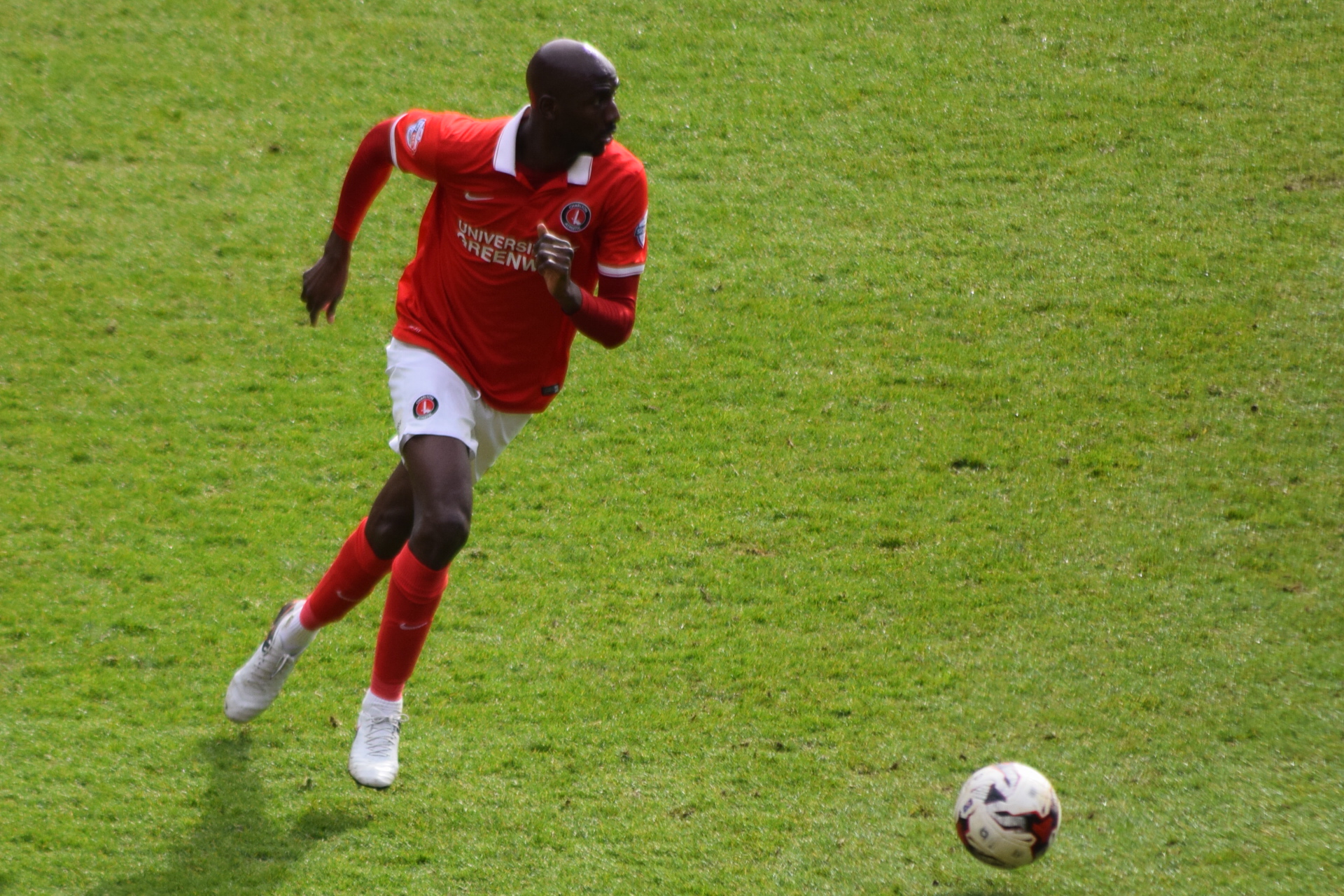
Alou Diarra in action for Charlton

=== Nancy ===
On 1 September 2016, Diarra joined Nancy, which was promoted to Ligue 1 after winning the 2015–16 Ligue 2 title, on a one-season deal. On 15 October 2016, Diarra scored Nancy's only goal in a 2–1 home defeat against Paris Saint-Germain in a Ligue 1 match by heading in Benoît Pedretti's free kick from the right in the 55th minute. That was his first Ligue 1 goal since scoring one for Marseille in early 2012. He left the club at the end of the season.

== International career ==
=== Youth ===
Diarra is a former French youth international having earned caps at under-20 and under-21 level. He earned his first international youth call up in 2001 by coach Raymond Domenech ahead of the 2001 FIFA World Youth Championship. Diarra played in the first group stage match; a 5–0 hammering of Iran. In the 30th minute of the match against Iran, Diarra was substituted out due to an injury. The injury was deemed severe and Diarra missed the rest of the tournament. France ultimately crashed out of the competition in the quarter-finals losing 3–1 to a Javier Saviola-led Argentina. Diarra's only other confirmed appearance with the under-20 team was in a 1–0 win over Egypt in April 2002.

Diarra earned his first call up to the under-21 team in August 2002 for a friendly match against Cyprus. He made his debut in the match as France cruised to a 1–0 victory. Diarra featured regularly within the team as France attempted to qualify for both the 2004 UEFA European Under-21 Football Championship and the football tournament at the 2004 Summer Olympics. France failed to qualify for both competitions, which resulted in the end of Diarra's youth career. He appeared in 10 competitive matches with the team and scored his only goal in a 3–1 UEFA U21 tournament qualification win over Israel. In December 2003, Diarra was called up to the Mali national team to participate in the 2004 Africa Cup of Nations. Diarra turned down the opportunity to represent the nation of his parents in order to continue his career with his home country France.

=== Senior ===
On 13 August 2004, Diarra was named to the senior national team for the first time by Domenech to participate in a friendly match against Bosnia and Herzegovina. He did not make his debut in the match, but was named to the team again in October for 2006 FIFA World Cup qualification matches against the Republic of Ireland and Cyprus. Diarra earn his debut cap in the match against Ireland appearing as a substitute for Olivier Dacourt in a 0–0 draw. He featured with the team heavily in World Cup qualification primarily as a substitute for either Patrick Vieira or Claude Makélélé and, following France's qualification for the tournament, was named to the team to participate in the competition. In the competition, Diarra appeared in two matches. He appeared as a substitute for Vieira in the team's final group stage match against Togo and repeated this in the final match against Italy. France lost the final 5–3 in a penalty shootout, which Diarra did not participate in.

After appearing in a November 2006 friendly match against Greece, Diarra was absent from the national team for nearly two years, partly due to his struggle for playing time in Lyon. As a result, he missed UEFA Euro 2008, although he was named to the competition's preliminary squad. After regaining his form at Bordeaux, Diarra began making his way back into the team and participated in seven 2010 FIFA World Cup qualifying matches. He was later selected to participate in his second consecutive FIFA World Cup. France endured a disastrous campaign as the players went on strike in response to its disagreement over the expulsion of striker Nicolas Anelka from the team. In the team's final group stage match against hosts South Africa, with several veteran players missing from the squad, Diarra was rewarded with the captaincy for the first time in his international career and led the team to a 2–1 loss, which resulted in its elimination from the competition.

Diarra was one of several players retained by incoming coach Laurent Blanc, his former manager. After missing the August 2010 friendly due to suspension, he returned to the team in September playing the entire match in 2–0 wins over both Bosnia and Herzegovina and Romania. Diarra served as captain in both matches. On 9 February 2011, he captained the team for the fifth time in his career in their 1–0 victory over Brazil.

== Coaching career ==
In 2018, Diarra joined French club Lens as an assistant coach for the club's under-19 side. He eventually became an assistant for the reserve team, and in 2020, for the club's senior team coached by Franck Haise. Diarra left Lens in 2022, joining Troyes as manager of the under-19 side in the Championnat National U19. On 26 June 2025, Diarra was appointed assistant manager to Julien Stéphan at Championship side Queens Park Rangers. After 12 months in the role he officially departed as he searched for a head coach role

== Career statistics ==
Appearances and goals by national team and year
National team	Year	Apps	Goals
France	2004–05	3	0
France	2005–06	8	0
France	2006–07	1	0
France	2007–08	1	0
France	2008–09	7	0
France	2009–10	6	0
France	2010–11	8	0
France	2011–12	10	0
Total		44	0

== Honours ==
Lens

- UEFA Intertoto Cup: 2005

Lyon

- Ligue 1: 2006–07

Bordeaux

- Ligue 1: 2008–09
- Trophée des Champions: 2008, 2009

Marseille

- Coupe de la Ligue: 2011–12
- Trophée des Champions: 2011

France

- FIFA World Cup runner-up: 2006

== See also ==
- Sub-Saharan African community of Paris
