= David Bellion =

French footballer (born 1982)

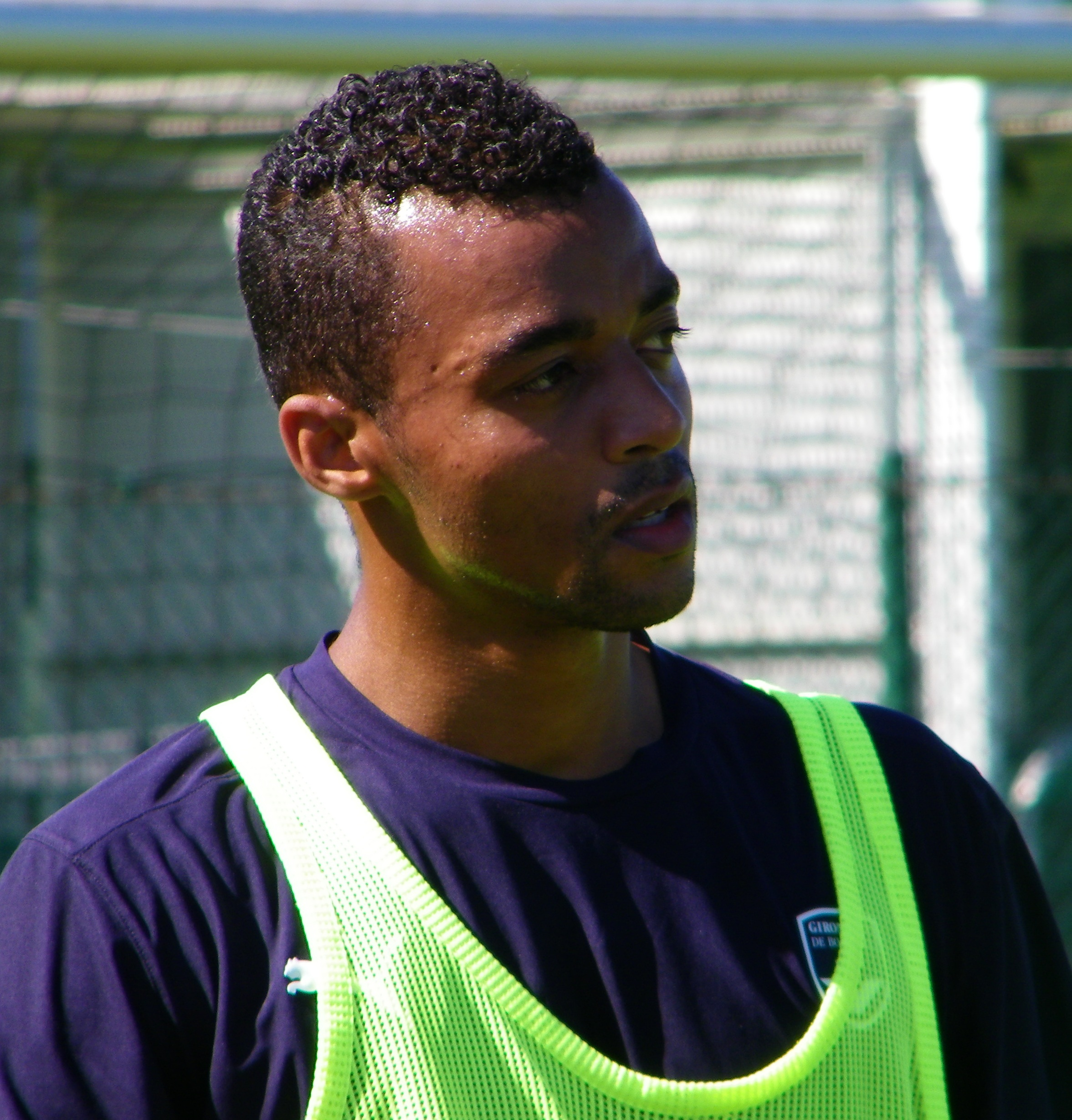
- Bellion training with Bordeaux in 2009

Personal information
- Full name: David Bellion
- Date of birth: 27 November 1982 (age 43)
- Place of birth: Sèvres, France
- Height: 1.81 m (5 ft 11 in)
- Position: Striker

Youth career
- 1996–1998: Cannes

Senior career*
Years	Team	Apps	(Gls)
1998–2001	Cannes	0	(0)
2001–2003	Sunderland	20	(1)
2003–2006	Manchester United	24	(4)
2005–2006	→ West Ham United (loan)	8	(0)
2006	→ Nice (loan)	15	(5)
2006–2007	Nice	30	(7)
2007–2014	Bordeaux	156	(28)
2010–2011	→ Nice (loan)	10	(0)
2014–2016	Red Star	29	(8)
Total		250	(45)

International career
2002–2003	France U21	4	(0)
- * Club domestic league appearances and goals

David Bellion (born 27 November 1982) is a French former professional footballer who played as a striker. His previous clubs include Cannes, Sunderland, Manchester United, West Ham United, Nice, Bordeaux and Red Star.

== Club career ==
=== Cannes ===
Bellion was born in Sèvres, Hauts-de-Seine, to a Senegalese father and French mother. He started his career at Cannes at the age of 14, and earned a move to English club Sunderland in the summer of 2001. In his youth, he was a talented athlete, competing in the 2001 National Indoor Youth Championships, where he won the 60 metres.

=== Sunderland ===
Bellion signed for Premier League club Sunderland in July 2001. He made his debut at Fulham in August 2001, coming on as a substitute. His first senior goal was against Aston Villa at the Stadium of Light which gave Sunderland a 1–0 win in September 2002. It was his only Premier League goal for Sunderland. Following the goal, Bellion became a first-team regular at Sunderland, although he was unable to save them from relegation with the third-lowest Premier League points tally ever. During the 2002–03 season, Sunderland offered a new contract, but he turned it down as he wanted to leave the club. He agreed a move to Manchester United in July 2003, although the transfer was completed amid "tapping up" allegations that were resolved by Sunderland, receiving a compensation payment of £2 million, rising to £3 million depending on appearances, in an out-of-court agreement.

=== Manchester United ===
Bellion scored on his Manchester United debut against Celtic on the club's pre-season American tour. His first competitive goal came at Leeds United in the League Cup, and he scored two goals in the 2003–04 season, against Everton and Tottenham Hotspur, both at Old Trafford. During the season, he made his Champions League debut when he came on as a substitute in the 5–0 win over Panathinaikos in the group stage.

Despite being compared to Thierry Henry and early-season goals against Norwich City and Bolton Wanderers, the 2004–05 campaign proved frustrating for Bellion as he found himself increasingly frozen out of the first-team squad. His season was curtailed in early May, when he suffered a fractured fibula against Charlton Athletic Reserves. During 2004–05, Bellion scored his first Champions League goal (not including qualifiers) in a 6–2 win over Fenerbahçe and was involved in the squad for the FA Community Shield in a 3–1 loss against Arsenal.

Bellion spent time on loan at West Ham United at the beginning of the 2005–06 season. He scored on his debut, a League Cup win over Sheffield Wednesday on 20 September 2005. After the match, manager Alan Pardew praised Bellion, believing he could make an impact at the club. However, he never flourished and his first-team opportunities were limited and he went on to make just ten appearances for the club, mostly as a substitute.

=== Nice ===
He returned to France on 9 January 2006, joining Nice on loan until the end of the season, a move that was later made permanent in June 2006. Speaking of his move, Bellion said it was good to be home in France, and he settled quickly at the club. Shortly after his move, Bellion made his debut, coming on as a substitute and receiving a yellow card, in a 0–0 draw against Nantes. Bellion scored in the quarter-final of Coupe de la Ligue in a 2–1 win over Bordeaux on 17 January 2006. The club advanced to the semi-final and then progressed to the final but lost against Nancy on 22 April 2006. On 14 February 2006, he scored his first goal, the only goal in the match, against Saint-Étienne. Toward the end of the season, he scored three goals in three matches against Rennes, Ajaccio and Metz. At the end of the season, Bellion signed a permanent deal with the club. After finally leaving Manchester United, Bellion said he had no hard feelings toward the club, and also said his experience in English football was "frustrating".

In his first permanent season at Nice, Bellion's form dropped. He made several critical errors and misjudgements, and scored eight goals. Following an injury on 23 December 2006, in a 2–1 loss against Lens, it was announced that Bellion would be out for three weeks. Soon after, he had another injury on his right fibula. He completed his recovery on 9 March 2007 after three months on the sidelines. Despite this, Bellion finished his first season with eight goals, making him the club's joint top scorer in the league along with Bakari Koné.

=== Bordeaux ===
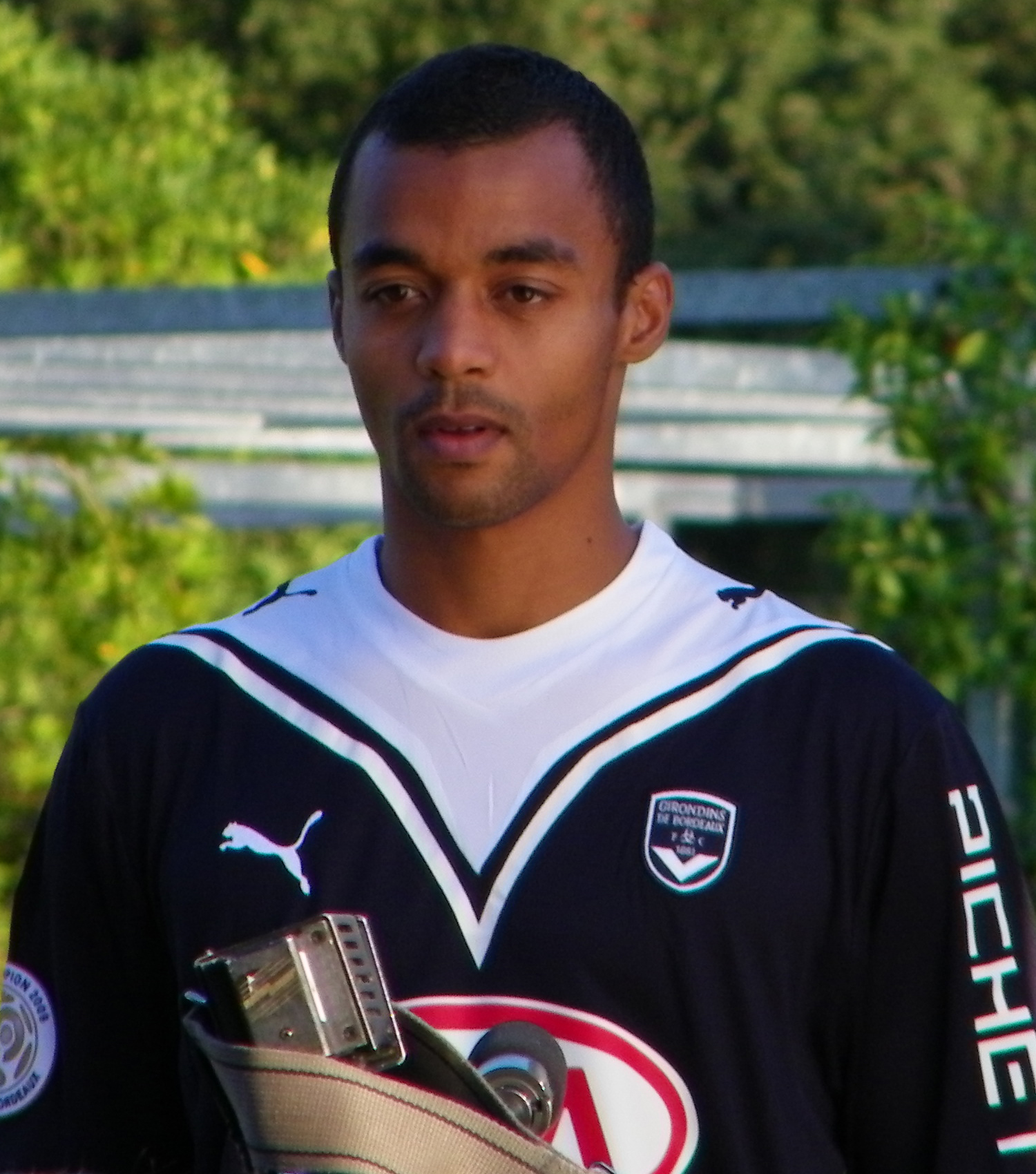
Bellion with Bordeaux

Bellion joined Bordeaux on 15 July 2007, signing a four-year deal for a fee rumoured to total €4.5 million. He was signed as a replacement for Jean-Claude Darcheville. He marked his first match by scoring the only goal in a 1–0 win over Lens. Up until the second half of the season, he was in impressive form, scoring eight goals in twelve matches. However, in the second half, he only scored four goals. The club would end up in second place behind Lyon, who won their seventh title. Despite failing to win the league and his faltering form in the latter half, Bellion said it was his best season.

The following 2008–09 season, Bellion became third-choice striker behind Marouane Chamakh and Fernando Cavenaghi, limiting his first-team opportunities. He managed to score four goals this season while mostly playing off the bench. In the UEFA Cup third round against Galatasaray, he scored past Morgan De Sanctis in just eleven seconds, the fastest goal in the history of the UEFA Cup, but Bordeaux lost 4–3. Towards the end of the season, the club would win not only the Coupe de la Ligue but also the league.

At the start of the 2009–10 season, Bellion signed a three-year contract with the club, keeping him there until 2014. He did not regret this, when asked by L'Équipe after the season ended whether he regretted signing a contract in the interview. Bellion spoken out of his first team, saying he had become more increasingly frustrated at the club, due to lack of regular football. However, in three seasons, Bellion was barely used in the first team and stayed on the substitutes bench, even upon his return on loan from Nice and also his own injury concerns. In an interview with Goal.com, Bellion claims that he was ignored by the team's management.

In December 2010, Bellion returned to Nice on loan until the end of the season, to gain first-team experience. Shortly after moving, he believed the move would relaunch his career. However, his time at Nice was 'forgettable', due to his lack of goals, goals that he had produced four years ago, and much to the fans' dismay and also his own injury concerns, like being injured in a taxi for example. He departed back to Bordeaux at the end of the season.

Bellion scored his first goal in two years since September 2010 in the Europa League in a 1–0 win over Marítimo on 8 November 2012. After the match, Bellion spoke of his first goal as "running a rhythm" to score. He scored again, in the second round of Coupe de France, in a 2–1 win to Moulins. A few weeks later, Bellion scored his first league in over four years, in a 2–0 win against Valenciennes. After the match, Bellion described his first goal in over a year as "mini relief and a small reward". However, towards the end of the season, Bellion was soon less included, especially missing out from the squad, when the club won the Coupe de France.

In June 2013, Bellion was linked with a move to the United States, where he trained with the New York Cosmos on trial. Eventually, his trial with them ended after he rejected a move, and he travelled back to Bordeaux.

=== Red Star ===
In July 2014, after his contract with Bordeaux expired, Bellion joined Championnat National club Red Star. He registered a consolation goal on his first appearance on 8 August 2014 to Amiens, as Red Star were defeated 3–1. Bellion's goals helped Red Star win the league and gain promotion to Ligue 2 after beating Istres with a 4–0 victory at home on 8 May 2015. After ending his playing career in 2016, Bellion remained with the club after being appointed their creative director, building links between the club and the world of culture and the arts.

== Honours ==
Manchester United

- FA Community Shield: 2003

Bordeaux

- Ligue 1: 2008–09
- Trophée des Champions: 2008, 2009
- Coupe de la Ligue: 2008–09

Red Star

- Championnat National: 2014–15

Individual

- UNFP Player of the Month: August 2007
