= Souleymane Diawara =

Senegalese footballer (born 1978)

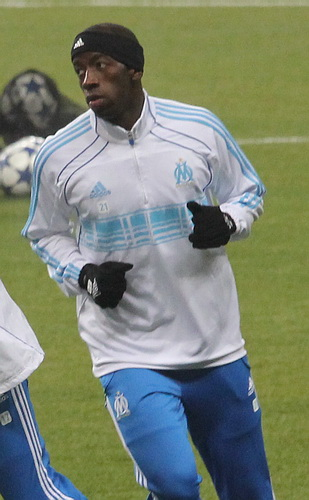
- Diawara with Marseille in 2010

Personal information
- Date of birth: 24 December 1978 (age 47)
- Place of birth: Dakar, Senegal
- Height: 1.87 m (6 ft 2 in)
- Position: Defender

Senior career*
| Years | Team | Apps | (Gls) |
| 1998–2003 | Le Havre | 104 | (2) |
| 2003–2006 | Sochaux | 84 | (4) |
| 2006–2007 | Charlton Athletic | 23 | (0) |
| 2007–2009 | Bordeaux | 63 | (2) |
| 2009–2014 | Marseille | 154 | (9) |
| 2014–2015 | Nice | 14 | (0) |
| Total | | 442 | (17) |

International career
| 2002–2012 | Senegal | 48 | (0) |
- * Club domestic league appearances and goals

Souleymane Diawara (born 24 December 1978) is a Senegalese former professional footballer who played as a defender. He spent most of his career in France, playing for Le Havre, Sochaux, Bordeaux, Marseille and Nice, apart from a brief stint at Charlton Athletic. At the international level, he represented Senegal.

== Career ==
Diawara acquired French nationality by naturalization on 2 February 1998.

He began his career at Le Havre, spending two seasons in Division 1 before the club was relegated. He stayed at Le Havre until 2003, before signing for Sochaux.

On 19 November 2002, he made his debut with the Senegalese national team against South Africa in a friendly match.

In 2006, he was transferred to Charlton Athletic. The following year he joined Bordeaux to strengthen the central defense with Marc Planus. Represented the national team at the 2006 Africa Cup of Nations, where his team took 4th place for the third time in history. Diawara was dropped from the Senegal squad in August 2006, ahead of their friendly with Ivory Coast, due to a breach of discipline.

In July 2009, he signed a four-year contract with Marseille, with the transfer fee estimated at €7 million. On 8 August, he participated in his first game for his new club against Grenoble, which Marseille won 2–0.

On 23 April 2011, Marseille won the Coupe de la Ligue for the second consecutive year. Diawara thereby became the player holding the record for most Coupe de la Ligue trophies, having won his first with Sochaux in 2004, his second with Bordeaux and his third and fourth trophies with Marseille.

In September 2015, Diawara announced his retirement from professional football.

== Honours ==
Sochaux

- Coupe de la Ligue: 2003–04

Bordeaux

- Ligue 1: 2008–09
- Coupe de la Ligue: 2008–09
- Trophée des Champions: 2008

Marseille

- Ligue 1: 2009–10
- Coupe de la Ligue: 2009–10, 2010–11
- Trophée des Champions: 2010, 2011

Senegal

- Africa Cup of Nations fourth place: 2006

Individual

- Ligue 1 Team of the Year: 2008–09, 2009–10
