= Fernando Menegazzo =

Brazilian footballer (born 1981)

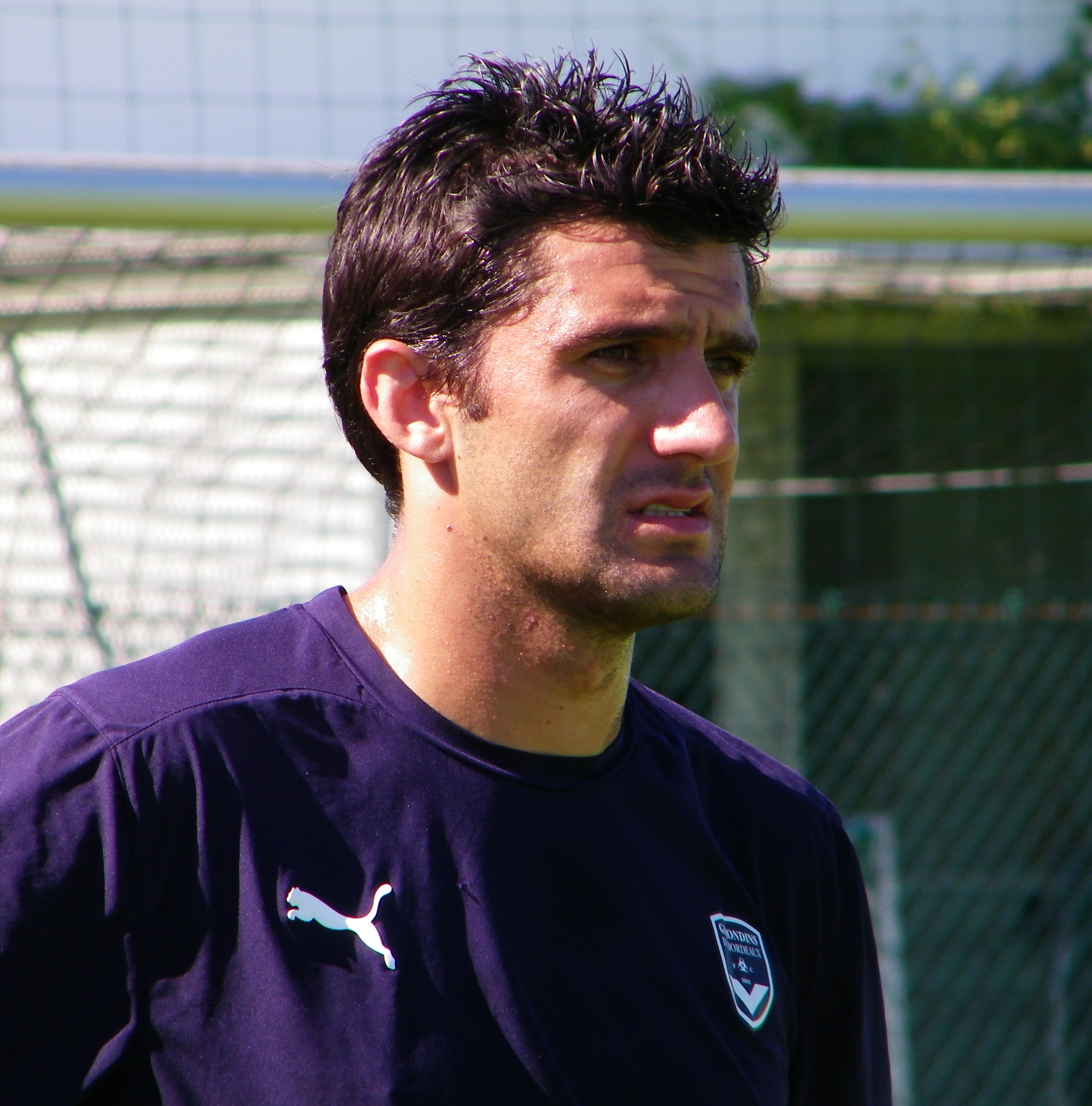
- Fernando Menegazzo

Personal information
- Date of birth: 3 May 1981 (age 45)
- Place of birth: Anita Garibaldi, Brazil
- Height: 1.86 m (6 ft 1 in)
- Position: Central midfielder

Senior career*
Years	Team	Apps	(Gls)
1999–2003	Juventude	45	(6)
2002	→ Grêmio (loan)	10	(0)
2003–2005	Siena	24	(2)
2005	→ Catania (loan)	18	(0)
2005–2011	Bordeaux	190	(20)
2011–2014	Al-Shabab	68	(10)
2014	Club Brugge	10	(1)
Total		365	(39)

International career
2003–2007	Brazil	4	(0)
- * Club domestic league appearances and goals

Fernando Menegazzo (born 3 May 1981), simply known as Fernando, is a former Brazilian professional footballer who played as a central midfielder.

== Career ==
Fernando was born in Anita Garibaldi. He joined French Ligue 1 side FC Girondins de Bordeaux in summer 2005, on loan from A.C. Siena. He made the move permanent a year later and played an important role as Bordeaux finished as runners-up in the 2005–06 Ligue 1 season, qualifying for the 2006–07 UEFA Champions League.

In the summer of 2007, despite several of his teammates leaving the club, such as Julien Faubert, Stéphane Dalmat, Rio Mavuba and Vladimír Šmicer, he signed a new four-year contract with Bordeaux.

He also won the 2007 Copa América with Brazil.

On 16 June 2011, Fernando signed a three-year deal with Saudi Arabian club Al-Shabab at the request of coach Michel Preud'homme. He moved to Club Brugge KV in June 2014, again at Preud'homme's request. He left the club in December 2014.

== Career statistics ==
=== Club ===
Appearances and goals by club, season and competition
Club	Season	League			State League		National Cup		League Cup		Continental		Other		Total	
Club	Season	Division	Apps	Goals	Apps	Goals	Apps	Goals	Apps	Goals	Apps	Goals	Apps	Goals	Apps	Goals
Juventude	2000	Série A	7	1	—		—		—		—		—		7	1
Juventude	2001	Série A	22	4	5	0	6	0	—		—		—		33	4
Juventude	2003	Série A	7	1	4	0	2	0	—		—		—		13	1
Juventude	Total		36	6	9	0	8	0	—		—		—		53	6
Grêmio (loan)	2002	Série A	10	0	2	0	0	0	—		9	0	16	0	37	0
Siena	2003–04	Serie A	18	2	—		3	1	—		—		—		21	3
Siena	2004–05	Serie A	6	0	—		4	1	—		—		—		10	1
Siena	Total		24	2	—		7	2	—		—		—		31	4
Catania (loan)	2004–05	Serie B	18	0	—		—		—		—		—		18	0
Bordeaux	2005–06	Ligue 1	31	6	—		3	0	1	0	—		—		35	6
Bordeaux	2006–07	Ligue 1	32	2	—		3	0	3	1	3	0	—		41	3
Bordeaux	2007–08	Ligue 1	32	3	—		2	1	1	0	4	0	—		39	4
Bordeaux	2008–09	Ligue 1	31	6	—		0	0	4	0	8	0	1	0	44	6
Bordeaux	2009–10	Ligue 1	29	1	—		2	0	2	0	9	1	1	1	43	3
Bordeaux	2010–11	Ligue 1	35	2	—		2	0	2	0	—		—		39	2
Bordeaux	Total		190	20	—		12	1	13	1	24	1	2	1	241	24
Al-Shabab	2011–12	Saudi Pro League	22	3	—		1	1	2	0	—		—		25	04
Al-Shabab	2012–13	Saudi Pro League	26	3	—		5	0	0	0	7	0	—		38	3
Al-Shabab	2013–14	Saudi Pro League	20	4	—		2	1	2	1	9	2	—		33	8
Al-Shabab	Total		68	10	—		8	1	4	1	16	2	—		96	14
Club Brugge	2014–15	Belgian Pro League	10	1	—		1	0	—		9	1	—		20	2
Career total			354	39	11	0	36	4	17	2	58	4	18	1	494	50

=== International ===
Appearances and goals by national team and year
National team	Year	Apps	Goals
Brazil	2001	0	0
Brazil	2006	1	0
Brazil	2007	3	0
Total		4	0

== Honours ==
=== Club ===
Al-Shabab

- Saudi Pro League: 2011–12
- King Cup of Champions: 2014; Runner-up: 2013

Bordeaux

- Ligue 1: 2008–09
- Coupe de la Ligue: 2006–07, 2008–09
- Trophée des Champions: 2008, 2009

=== International ===
Brazil

- Copa América: 2007
