= Pierre Ducasse (footballer) =

French footballer (born 1987)

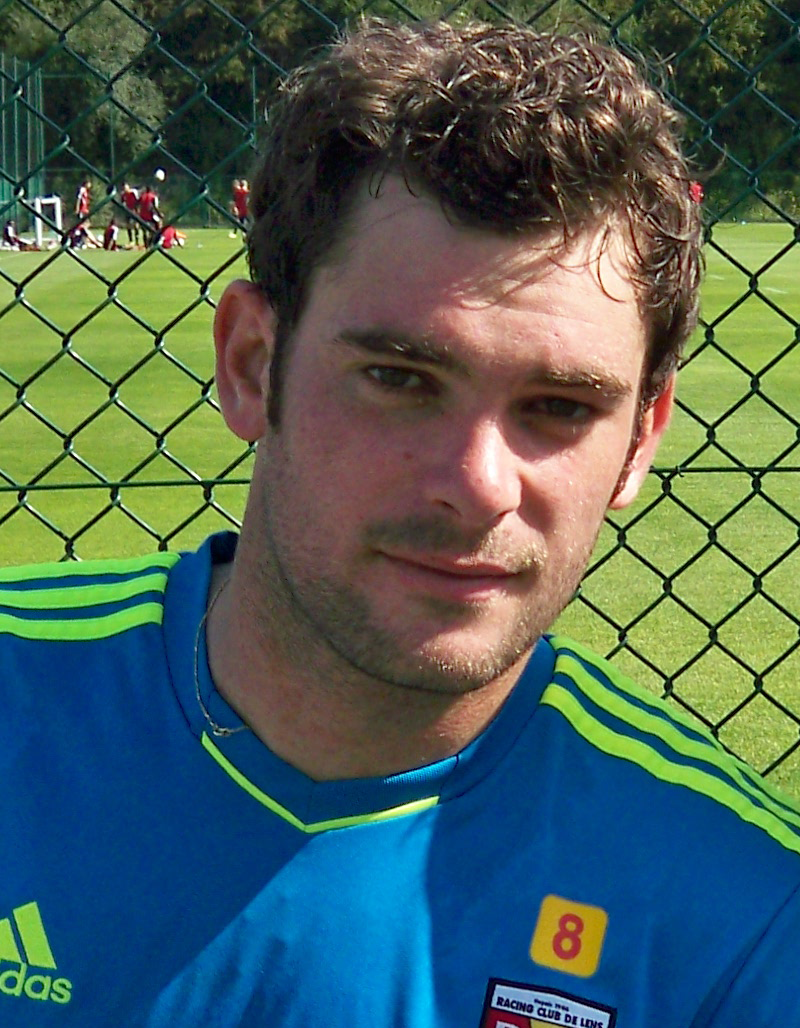
- Ducasse at training with Lens in 2011

Personal information
- Date of birth: 7 May 1987 (age 39)
- Place of birth: Bordeaux, France
- Height: 1.79 m (5 ft 10 in)
- Position: Defensive midfielder

Youth career
- 1994–1998: Marcheprime Sport
- 1998–2005: Bordeaux

Senior career*
Years	Team	Apps	(Gls)
2005–2011	Bordeaux	44	(3)
2009–2010	→ Lorient (loan)	30	(1)
2011–2014	Lens	42	(3)
2015–2017	Boulogne	21	(0)
2017–2020	Stade Bordelais	52	(9)
2020–2022	US Lège-Cap-Ferret	9	(1)
Total		198	(17)

International career
2004	France U17	1	(0)
2006	France U21	1	(0)
Medal record
Men's football
Representing France
UEFA European Under-17 Championship
Winner	2004 France
- * Club domestic league appearances and goals

Pierre Ducasse (born 7 May 1987) is a French former professional footballer who played as a midfielder.

== Club career ==
Born in Bordeaux, Ducasse began in the youth ranks of Bordeaux and became part of the first team in 2005. He made his Ligue 1 debut on 30 July 2005 on the first day of league, in a 2–0 win away to Marseille and scored the second goal for his team in the 87th minute. The following season he was crowned champion of the Coupe de la Ligue with Bordeaux, winning the final against Lyon 1–0. In 2008, he accomplished another title, the Trophée des Champions.

Ducasse had a three-year spell with Lens, and after a season without a club, he signed with Boulogne in July 2015.

== International career ==
With the France U17 national team Ducasse became champion of the 2004 European Under-17 Football Championship, winning the final against Spain 2–1.

== Honours ==
Bordeaux

- Ligue 1: 2008–09; runner-up 2007–08, 2005–06
- Trophée des Champions: 2008
- Coupe de la Ligue: 2007, 2009

Lens

- Ligue 2 runner-up: 2013–14

France U17

- UEFA European Under-17 Championship: 2004
