= Paprec =

French waste management company

- Company type: S.A.
- Industry: Waste management and recycling
- Founded: 1994
- Founder: Jean-Luc Petithuguenin
- Headquarters: Paris, France
- Key people: Jean-Luc Petithuguenin, founder Sébastien Petithuguenin (CEO); Mathieu Petithuguenin (chairman)
- Revenue: 3.5 billion euros (2025)
- Number of employees: 16,000 (2025)
- Subsidiaries: Paprec Switzerland; Grupo Paprec
- Website: www.paprec.com

The Paprec group or Paprec is a French company specialized in industrial and household waste management and recycling. Founded in 1994 by Jean-Luc Petithuguenin, it is currently headed by Sébastien Petithuguenin as CEO and by Mathieu Petithuguenin as chairman. Its headquarters are located in Paris.

As of 2023, the Paprec group operates in ten countries in Europe and Asia and collects 15 million tons of waste, which are processed in its 300 sites or factories. The company employs 16,000 people, and its total revenue in 2025 was 3.5 billion euros. It is currently the leading recycling company in France and the third-largest in waste management and energy recovery.

== History ==
=== 1994-2010: foundation and first investors ===
In 1994, Jean-Luc Petithuguenin, a director of Compagnie Générale des Eaux, decides to buy out Paprec from the group for 3 million euros. At that time, Paprec employs 45 people and has a revenue of 5 million euros.

In 2006, Paprec announces a change among its shareholders. The banks Crédit Agricole, which had entered the company's capital in 2000, and Société Générale, present since 2003, are replaced by BNP Paribas, Caisse des dépôts et consignations, and Banque Populaire. Together, these three groups acquire 35% of the company's capital and strengthen its financial capacity. Jean-Luc Petithuguenin, the company's founder and CEO, also increases his stake to 40%.

At that time, the Paprec Group employs 1,100 employees, with a total revenue of 200 million euros, and has acquired 45 companies since its creation. Nonetheless, two-thirds of its revenue results from organic growth, linked to the diversification of its activities. Originally specialized in paper recycling, an activity from which its name is derived, the company has expanded into other recycling activities such as plastics, industrial waste, waste sorting products, and wood.

Bernard Arnault's holding company, Financière Agache, in association with Rotschild bank and Quilvest, purchases 37% of Paprec's shares in 2008, while Jean-Luc Petithuguenin retains the majority of the capital. At that time, Paprec achieves a turnover of 320 million euros and employs over 2,000 people.

=== 2010's: new shareholders and green bonds ===
In 2012, Paprec completes its fourth round of fundraising for 100 millions euros, which enables the French sovereign wealth fund, the Fonds stratégique d'investissement, to enter its capital and acquire 25%. On this occasion, Jean-Luc Petithuguenin also increases his control by rising to 65%, after acquiring the majority of shares detained by Bernard Arnault's holding, and all the ones detained by the Quilvest investment fund and Rothschild bank.

Paprec is one of the first French companies to issue green bonds in 2015, a financial instrument specifically developed to facilitate the ecological transition, for a total amount of approximately 500 million euros.

In 2017, Jean-Luc Petithuguenin and his family still own 70% of the company, the remaining 30% being held by Bpifrance, France's new sovereign wealth fund. At that time, Paprec generates a total revenue of 1.5 billion euros and has 8.000 employees. The year after, Paprec raises one billion euros, consisting of 800 million euros through green bonds and 200 million euros through bank loans to finance its organic and external growth.

=== Recent history ===
Paprec inaugurates its new premises in June 2019, on its historic site in La Courneuve, Seine-Saint-Denis, after 18 months of construction and 8 million euros of investment. The new complex covers an area of 4,200 square meters. A few months later, Jean-Luc Petithuguenin appointes his sons, Sébastien, as chief executive officer and Mathieu, as general manager, while retaining his position as president. At that time, Paprec had 9,000 employees across its 210 locations in France. It is also the first recycling company in France, with a total revenue of about 1.5 billion euros.

In 2021, Paprec raises funds once again through green bonds, totaling 450 million euros, with the aim of financing its growth and reaching a revenue of 2 billion euros by the end of the year. Meanwhile, the group completes the acquisition of TIRU, a company specialized in energy recovery from waste.

Paprec also expands its presence in Spain through the acquisition of three small companies. Two years later, the purchase of 60% of the shares of the Catalan company GBi Serveis completes its establishment in the country, making Spain its second-largest market after France. In 2023, Paprec also acquires CLD, a group that manages a large part of Barcelona's waste collection. CLD possesses five sorting centres and employs around 1,600 people. Paprec is targeting Spain in particular, as the country is still lagging behind in terms of recycling and offers excellent development perspectives.

In that same year, new shareholders join the company: Vauban Infrastructures Partners (Natixis), and the Crédit Agricole. They join the existing historical shareholders: Bpifrance, BNP Paribas, and Arkea. Jean-Luc Petithuguenin and his family remain the majority shareholders of the company.

Currently, Paprec declares to be the leading French company in recycling and the third-largest in waste management and energy recovery.

== Organization ==
As of 2023, the Paprec group operates in ten countries, including France, Switzerland, and United Arab Emirates, and collects 15 million tons of waste, which are processed in its 300 sites or factories. The company employs 13,000 people.

=== Entities ===
In 2023, Paprec has about sixty entities, with the most important listed below:

Name	Acquisition	Activities
CDI Recyclage	2010	Recovery of waste paper, cardboard and plastic
Coved Environnement	2017	Household waste collection and recycling
Paprec Auvergne	2017	Waste collection and recycling
FCR		Sale of raw materials
France Plastiques Recyclage		Plastic bottles recycling
La Corbeille Bleue		Office waste collection and recycling
Paprec Agro	2011	Green waste recycling
Paprec Métal		Scrap metal collection and recycling
Paprec Switzerland	2010	Waste collection and recycling
Recydis		Collection and processing of hazardous industrial waste
TIRU	2022	Energy recovery from waste

=== Human resources ===
Paprec places particular emphasis on its human resources to foster employee engagement and reduce turnover. As the company's recruitment needs increase year after year, Paprec prides itself on hiring various profiles, especially those considered more distant from the job market, such as seniors or immigrants.

The company rewards its top-performing employees each year with a trip and a "Castor d'or" (golden beaver in French), an award created by the company and based on the César Awards. This award ceremony invites personalities like Jean-Pierre Dick or Brigitte Lefèvre, the director of dance at the Paris Opera, for which Paprec serves as a sponsor.

In February 2014, Paprec becomes the first French company to adopt a charter of secularism and diversity, unanimously voted on by all the employees of the group. It implies that candidates applying for a position within the company must embrace diversity and have a strong team spirit. The wearing of conspicuous religious symbols is also prohibited, which has garnered significant media coverage for the company, not without controversy. It also leads to the presentation of an award by the mayor of Paris to its CEO, Jean-Luc Petithuguenin.

== Activities ==
Paprec Group is involved in recycling, waste management, and environmental services, including the recycling of paper and cardboard, waste from the tertiary sector, ordinary industrial waste, construction waste, selective household collection, plastics, wood, scrap metal, hazardous or special industrial waste, electronic and electrical waste, batteries, and green waste.

As of 2018, Paprec Group collects, sorts, and recycles 11 million tons of waste produced by its 40,000 customers, industrial clients, such as Chantiers de l'Atlantique or Valeo, and municipalities. It then processes them in its 200 factories and resells the resulting secondary raw materials.

45% of Paprec's revenue comes from the sale of reprocessed materials. Some of them, such as rubble or metals, are sold directly to construction companies. Others, like paper and plastic, are negotiated by twenty traders with manufacturers worldwide. Prices range between 35 euros per ton for low-grade paper and 1,000 euros per ton for PET. In 2018, 65% of Paprec's raw material sales, including recycled plastics, are conducted outside of France, particularly in Europe and Asia.

In France, Paprec makes its entry into the energy sector in 2017 and establishes a dedicated entity called Paprec Énergies in 2022. This includes also activities such as anaerobic digestion of organic waste to produce fertilizers and biogas.

== Sponsoring ==
=== Artistic sponsorship ===
Since its establishment, Paprec Group sponsors an artist each year, allowing them to express their vision of recycling. Since 2000, Paprec Group has supported the Paris Opera by sponsoring several operas and ballets. Since 2010, the group has also been the main sponsor of the Paris Opera Ballet.

=== Sports sponsorship ===
Since 2004, Paprec Group has been sponsoring the French sailor Jean-Pierre Dick in the IMOCA 60 and MOD70 circuits, with boats co-sponsored by Virbac, an animal health company. They have also sponsored Yann Eliès in the 2014 Route du Rhum on an Ultim 70 boat named Paprec Recyclage. In 2022, the group commits to a six-year partnership as the main sponsor of the Solitaire du Figaro Paprec and also lends its name to the Transat en double Concarneau-Saint-Barthélémy (formerly Transat AG2R) as the title partner. On June 5, 2025, skipper Yoann Richomme announced that he and his sponsor, Paprec, will build a new latest-generation foiling IMOCA for the 2028 Vendée Globe. For its part, Crédit Mutuel Arkéa announced that it will not be participating in this project.

Paprec also sponsors other clubs and sports, including the American football team Flash de La Courneuve.
