= O'Brien, Argentina =

Coordinates: 34.9°S 60.75°W

Eduardo O'Brien is a town in Buenos Aires Province, Argentina, about 230 kilometres (143 mi) west of Buenos Aires, which was officially founded on 21 March 1909 on land provided by Eduardo O'Brien (1836–1912), who was born in County Wexford, Ireland and emigrated to Brazil at the age of fourteen with his parents Patrick (1802–1892) and Frances (1802–1890). When in 1907 a railway was built across his estate, O'Brien donated land for the construction of a railway station. The station carried his name, later, in the year 1935, it was changed to General O'Brien.
