= Marc Planus =

French footballer (born 1982)

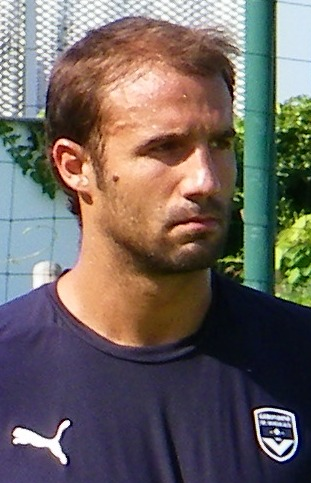
- Planus with Bordeaux in 2009

Personal information
- Full name: Marc Planus
- Date of birth: 7 March 1982 (age 44)
- Place of birth: Bordeaux, France
- Height: 1.83 m (6 ft 0 in)
- Position: Defender

Youth career
- Bordeaux

Senior career*
Years	Team	Apps	(Gls)
2002–2015	Bordeaux	330	(5)
Total		330	(5)

International career
2010	France	1	(0)
- * Club domestic league appearances and goals

Marc Planus (born 7 March 1982) is a French former professional footballer who played as a defender. A one-club man, he played his entire professional career for his local club Bordeaux. He earned one cap for the France national team and was in the squad for the 2010 FIFA World Cup.

== Club career ==
Planus made his league debut on 9 November 2002, against Rennes. He went on to play seventeen games in Ligue 1 in the 2002–03 season.

It was the first of more than 200 league matches. In 2006–07 and 2008–09 he won the Coupe de la Ligue (scoring a goal in the 2009 final) and in both 2008–09 and 2009–10 he won the Trophée des Champions. At the end of the 2014–15 Ligue 1 season, Planus announced his retirement from football.

== Honours ==
Bordeaux

- Ligue 1: 2008–09
- Coupe de France: 2012–13
- Coupe de la Ligue: 2006–07, 2008–09
- Trophée des Champions: 2008, 2009

== See also ==
- List of one-club men in association football
