= Anita Garibaldi, Santa Catarina =

Anita Garibaldi
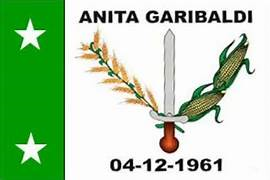
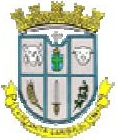
- Flag Coat of arms

- Location within Brazil
- Coordinates: 27°00′07″S 51°24′21″W
- Country: Brazil
- Region: South
- State: (Santa Catarina (state)) Santa Catarina

Area
  - Total: 588.612 km^{2} (227.264 sq mi)
- Elevation: 885 m (2,904 ft)

Population (2020)
  - Total: 6,957
  - Density: 17/km^{2} (44/sq mi)
- Time zone: UTC−3 (BRT)
- HDI (2000): 0.813
- Website: http://www.anitagaribaldi.sc.gov.br

Anita Garibaldi is a municipality located in the state of Santa Catarina, Brazil. The municipality covers about 588.612 km^{2} and has 6,957 inhabitants. It is named after Anita Garibaldi, the Brazilian wife and comrade-in-arms of Italian revolutionary Giuseppe Garibaldi.
