= 2008–09 Ligue 1 =

71st season of top-tier French football

Ligue 1
- Season: 2008–09
- Dates: 9 August 2008 – 30 May 2009
- Champions: Bordeaux; 6th Ligue 1 title 6th French title
- Relegated: Caen; Nantes; Le Havre
- Champions League: Bordeaux; Marseille; Lyon
- Europa League: Toulouse; Lille
- Matches: 380
- Goals: 858 (2.26 per match)
- Top goalscorer: André-Pierre Gignac (24 goals)
- Biggest home win: Marseille 4–0 Auxerre (17 August 2008); Bordeaux 4–0 Le Havre (28 October 2008); Bordeaux 4–0 Paris Saint-Germain (11 January 2009); Marseille 4–0 Rennes (30 May 2009)
- Biggest away win: Nantes 1–4 Le Mans (30 August 2008); Saint-Étienne 1–4 Lorient (29 October 2008); Nantes 1–4 Paris Saint-Germain (7 February 2009)
- Highest scoring: Rennes 4–4 Marseille (9 August 2008) (8 goals)
- Highest attendance: 78,056, Lille 2–0 Lyon (7 March 2009)
- Lowest attendance: 6,294, AS Monaco 3–0 Le Mans (23 November 2008)
- Average attendance: 20,913

The 2008–09 Ligue 1 season was the 71st since its establishment. Bordeaux became champions for the sixth time on the last weekend of the season. The fixtures were announced on 23 May 2008. The season began on 9 August 2008 and ended on 30 May 2009. A total of 20 teams contested the league, consisting of 17 who competed the previous season and three that were promoted from France's second division Ligue 2.

Bordeaux consecutively won their last 11 league games of the season and clinched the title on 30 May 2009 after the 1–0 victory against Caen. This was Bordeaux's sixth title and their first since the 1998–99 season. Bordeaux's title victory ended a historic run for Lyon, who had won seven consecutive titles beginning with the 2001–02 season. Le Havre, Nantes and Caen were relegated to Ligue 2. Both Le Havre and Nantes were promoted from Ligue 2 last season. Marseille, Lyon, Toulouse and Lille all secured European football for the 2009–10 season through their league position.

== Teams ==
=== Promotion and relegation ===
RC Lens, RC Strasbourg and FC Metz were relegated to the 2008–09 Ligue 2 after finishing in the bottom three spots of the table at the end of the 2007–08 season. Lens were relegated to the Ligue 2 after 17 seasons of continuous membership in the top football league of France, while Strasbourg and Metz made their immediate return to the second level.

The three relegated teams were replaced by three 2007–08 Ligue 2 sides. Champions Le Havre, who terminated their second-level status after five years, runners-up FC Nantes, who returned to the top flight after one season in second level and Grenoble Foot 38 returned to highest French league for first time after 35 years.

=== Stadia and locations ===
Location of teams in Ligue 1 2008–09

| Club | Location | Venue | Capacity |
|---|---|---|---|
| Auxerre | Auxerre | Stade de l'Abbé-Deschamps | 24,493 |
| Bordeaux | Bordeaux | Stade Chaban-Delmas | 34,327 |
| Caen | Caen | Stade Michel d'Ornano | 21,500 |
| Grenoble | Grenoble | Stade des Alpes | 20,000 |
| Le Havre | Le Havre | Stade Jules Deschaseaux | 16,454 |
| Le Mans | Le Mans | Stade Léon-Bollée | 17,500 |
| Lille | Villeneuve d'Ascq | Stadium Lille-Metropole | 21,803 |
| Lorient | Lorient | Stade du Moustoir | 16,669 |
| Lyon | Lyon | Stade de Gerland | 43,051 |
| Marseille | Marseille | Stade Vélodrome | 60,031 |
| Monaco | Fontvieille | Stade Louis II | 18,500 |
| Nancy | Tomblaine | Stade Marcel Picot | 20,087 |
| Nantes | Nantes | Stade de la Beaujoire | 38,285 |
| Nice | Nice | Stade du Ray | 17,415 |
| Paris Saint-Germain | Paris | Parc des Princes | 48,712 |
| Rennes | Rennes | Stade de la Route de Lorient | 31,127 |
| Saint-Étienne | Saint-Étienne | Stade Geoffroy-Guichard | 35,616 |
| Sochaux | Montbéliard | Stade Auguste Bonal | 20,025 |
| Toulouse | Toulouse | Stadium Municipal | 35,672 |
| Valenciennes | Valenciennes | Stade Nungesser | 16,547 |

=== Personnel and sponsoring ===
| Team | Manager | Kit manufacturer | Shirt sponsors (front) | Shirt sponsors (back) | Shirt sponsors (sleeve) | Shorts sponsors |
|---|---|---|---|---|---|---|
| Auxerre | (France) Jean Fernandez | Airness | Nasuba Express, Invicta Group | Creditec | Conseil général de l'Yonne | None |
| Bordeaux | (France) Laurent Blanc | Puma | Kia | Cdiscount | Pichet Immobilier | Cdiscount |
| Caen | (France) Franck Dumas | Nike | GDE Recyclage (H)/Campagne de France (A), Celeos Groupe/Groupe CTI | Campagne de France (H)/GDE Recyclage (A) | Groupe Samro | Groupe Samro |
| Grenoble | (Bosnia and Herzegovina) Mehmed Baždarević | Nike | Index, Gaz Électricité de Grenoble (H), ISS | None | None | Samse |
| Le Havre | (France) Frédéric Hantz | Airness | Système U | Region Haute Normandie | Poweo | None |
| Le Mans | (France) Arnaud Cormier | Kappa | Fermiers de Loué (H)/Le Gaulois(A), NTN | Groupama | Système U | NTN |
| Lille | (France) Rudi Garcia | Canterbury of New Zealand | Partouche | Partouche | Nord-Pas-de-Calais | None |
| Lorient | (France) Christian Gourcuff | Erreà | La Trinitaine, Cap l'Orient Agglomération, B&B Hotels | Thermoseme | None | None |
| Lyon | (France) Claude Puel | Umbro | Novotel (H)/Ticket Restaurant (A), Apicil | Ticket Restaurant (H)/Novotel (A) | Ticket Restaurant (H)/Novotel (A) | Renault Trucks |
| Marseille | (Belgium) Eric Gerets | Adidas | Direct Énergie (H)/Neuf (A & in UEFA matches) | Groupama | Nasuba Express | Groupama |
| AS Monaco | (Brazil) Ricardo Gomes | Puma | Fedcom, HSBC, Fight Aids Monaco | HSBC | HSBC | None |
| Nancy | (Uruguay) Pablo Correa | Baliston | Odalys Vacances, Geodis Calberson, Clairefontaine, Grand Nancy | Triangle Interim | Regina | Chaussea |
| Nantes | (France) Elie Baup | Kappa | Synergie Interim (H)/Profil Plus (A), Paprec Recyclage | Profil Plus (H)/Synergie Interim (A) | None | Complémentaire Retraite Mutualiste COREM |
| Nice | (France) Frédéric Antonetti | Lotto | Nasuba Express (H)/Ubaldi (A), Takara Multimédia, Communauté Nice Côte d'Azur | Ubaldi (H)/Nasuba Express (A) | Pizzorno Environnement | Minea Électroménager |
| PSG | (France) Paul Le Guen | Nike | Fly Emirates | Alain Afflelou | Poweo | Groupe Sendin |
| Rennes | (France) Guy Lacombe | Puma | Samsic Propreté, rennes.fr | Blot Immobilier | Association ELA | Groupe ROSE |
| Saint-Étienne | (France) Alain Perrin | Adidas | Konica Minolta, Conseil général de la Loire en Rhône-Alpes | Groupama | None | Fruité Entreprises |
| Sochaux | (France) Francis Gillot | Lotto | Mobil 1, Franche-Comté | Pays de Montbéliard Agglomération | CanéO | Meri/Creditec |
| Toulouse | (France) Alain Casanova | Airness | Groupe IDEC, Monné-Decroix, ISS | Newrest | None | Loft Groupe |
| Valenciennes | (France) Antoine Kombouaré | Diadora | Toyota (H)/SITA (A) | SITA (H)/Toyota (A) | Nord-Pas-de-Calais | Partouche |

== League table ==
| Pos | Team | Pld | W | D | L | GF | GA | GD | Pts | Qualification or relegation |
|---|---|---|---|---|---|---|---|---|---|---|
| 1 | Bordeaux (C) | 38 | 24 | 8 | 6 | 64 | 34 | +30 | 80 | Qualification to Champions League group stage |
| 2 | Marseille | 38 | 22 | 11 | 5 | 67 | 35 | +32 | 77 | Qualification to Champions League group stage |
| 3 | Lyon | 38 | 20 | 11 | 7 | 52 | 29 | +23 | 71 | Qualification to Champions League play-off round |
| 4 | Toulouse | 38 | 16 | 16 | 6 | 45 | 27 | +18 | 64 | Qualification to Europa League play-off round |
| 5 | Lille | 38 | 17 | 13 | 8 | 51 | 39 | +12 | 64 | Qualification to Europa League third qualifying round |
| 6 | Paris Saint-Germain | 38 | 19 | 7 | 12 | 49 | 38 | +11 | 64 | |
| 7 | Rennes | 38 | 15 | 16 | 7 | 42 | 34 | +8 | 61 | |
| 8 | Auxerre | 38 | 16 | 7 | 15 | 35 | 35 | 0 | 55 | |
| 9 | Nice | 38 | 13 | 11 | 14 | 40 | 41 | −1 | 50 | |
| 10 | Lorient | 38 | 10 | 15 | 13 | 47 | 47 | 0 | 45 | |
| 11 | Monaco | 38 | 11 | 12 | 15 | 41 | 45 | −4 | 45 | |
| 12 | Valenciennes | 38 | 10 | 14 | 14 | 35 | 42 | −7 | 44 | |
| 13 | Grenoble | 38 | 10 | 14 | 14 | 24 | 37 | −13 | 44 | |
| 14 | Sochaux | 38 | 10 | 12 | 16 | 40 | 48 | −8 | 42 | |
| 15 | Nancy | 38 | 10 | 12 | 16 | 38 | 47 | −9 | 42 | |
| 16 | Le Mans | 38 | 10 | 10 | 18 | 43 | 54 | −11 | 40 | |
| 17 | Saint-Étienne | 38 | 11 | 7 | 20 | 40 | 56 | −16 | 40 | |
| 18 | Caen (R) | 38 | 8 | 13 | 17 | 42 | 49 | −7 | 37 | Relegation to Ligue 2 |
| 19 | Nantes (R) | 38 | 9 | 10 | 19 | 33 | 54 | −21 | 37 | Relegation to Ligue 2 |
| 20 | Le Havre (R) | 38 | 7 | 5 | 26 | 30 | 67 | −37 | 26 | Relegation to Ligue 2 |

Source: Ligue 1
Rules for classification: 1) points; 2) goal difference; 3) number of goals scored.
France's third UEFA Europa League spot went to Ligue 2 side Guingamp, winners of 2008–09 Coupe de France.
(C) Champions; (R) Relegated

== Results ==
| Home \ Away | AUX | BOR | CAE | GRE | LHA | MFC | LIL | LOR | OL | OM | ASM | NAL | NAN | NIC | PSG | REN | STE | SOC | TFC | VAL |
|---|---|---|---|---|---|---|---|---|---|---|---|---|---|---|---|---|---|---|---|---|
| Auxerre | | 0–2 | 2–1 | 2–0 | 3–0 | 2–0 | 2–0 | 0–0 | 0–0 | 0–2 | 0–1 | 1–1 | 2–1 | 0–1 | 1–2 | 0–0 | 1–0 | 1–0 | 1–1 | 0–0 |
| Bordeaux | 2–0 | | 2–1 | 1–1 | 4–0 | 3–2 | 2–2 | 1–0 | 1–0 | 1–1 | 1–0 | 1–0 | 2–0 | 2–1 | 4–0 | 1–1 | 1–1 | 3–0 | 2–1 | 2–1 |
| Caen | 1–0 | 0–1 | | 2–2 | 0–1 | 3–1 | 0–1 | 1–1 | 0–1 | 0–1 | 2–2 | 1–2 | 3–0 | 1–1 | 0–1 | 1–1 | 2–0 | 2–0 | 0–0 | 3–1 |
| Grenoble | 0–0 | 0–1 | 2–1 | | 0–0 | 2–1 | 0–0 | 1–3 | 0–2 | 0–3 | 1–0 | 0–0 | 0–1 | 0–0 | 0–0 | 1–0 | 1–0 | 0–1 | 1–0 | 0–0 |
| Le Havre | 1–2 | 0–3 | 1–2 | 0–1 | | 1–2 | 0–1 | 1–3 | 0–1 | 0–1 | 2–3 | 2–3 | 0–2 | 1–0 | 1–3 | 1–0 | 2–4 | 2–1 | 0–1 | 2–1 |
| Le Mans | 0–2 | 1–3 | 2–0 | 1–1 | 2–0 | | 0–0 | 0–1 | 1–3 | 1–1 | 0–1 | 2–0 | 0–2 | 1–2 | 0–1 | 2–2 | 1–0 | 2–0 | 1–2 | 1–0 |
| Lille | 3–2 | 2–1 | 2–2 | 2–1 | 3–1 | 1–3 | | 1–1 | 2–0 (Note: The match was played at Stade de France.) | 1–2 | 2–1 | 3–2 | 2–0 | 1–1 | 0–0 | 1–0 | 3–0 | 3–2 | 1–1 | 1–0 |
| Lorient | 0–2 | 1–2 | 1–1 | 1–1 | 1–1 | 1–1 | 3–1 | | 0–0 | 1–2 | 1–1 | 1–0 | 3–0 | 0–1 | 0–1 | 1–2 | 3–1 | 1–2 | 1–0 | 1–1 |
| Lyon | 0–2 | 2–1 | 3–1 | 2–0 | 3–1 | 2–0 | 2–2 | 1–1 | | 0–0 | 2–2 | 2–1 | 3–0 | 3–2 | 0–0 | 1–1 | 1–1 | 2–0 | 3–0 | 0–0 |
| Marseille | 4–0 | 1–0 | 2–1 | 4–1 | 2–0 | 0–0 | 2–2 | 2–3 | 1–3 | | 0–0 | 0–3 | 2–0 | 2–1 | 2–4 | 4–0 | 3–1 | 2–1 | 2–2 | 0–0 |
| Monaco | 0–1 | 3–4 | 1–1 | 1–0 | 0–1 | 3–0 | 0–2 | 2–0 | 0–1 | 0–1 | | 3–1 | 1–2 | 1–2 | 1–0 | 3–1 | 2–2 | 1–1 | 3–2 | 1–1 |
| Nancy | 0–2 | 1–0 | 1–1 | 2–0 | 2–1 | 2–2 | 0–0 | 2–2 | 0–2 | 1–2 | 0–1 | | 2–0 | 1–2 | 1–1 | 0–0 | 1–2 | 1–1 | 0–0 | 2–0 |
| Nantes | 2–1 | 1–2 | 1–1 | 1–1 | 1–2 | 1–4 | 0–2 | 1–1 | 2–1 | 1–1 | 1–1 | 0–1 | | 2–0 | 1–4 | 1–1 | 1–0 | 1–1 | 1–1 | 2–0 |
| Nice | 2–0 | 2–2 | 2–2 | 0–0 | 0–0 | 2–2 | 0–1 | 2–0 | 1–3 | 0–2 | 0–0 | 2–1 | 2–1 | | 1–0 | 0–1 | 3–1 | 1–1 | 0–2 | 2–0 |
| Paris SG | 1–2 | 1–0 | 2–0 | 0–1 | 3–0 | 3–1 | 1–0 | 3–2 | 1–0 | 1–3 | 0–0 | 4–1 | 1–0 | 2–1 | | 0–1 | 2–1 | 2–1 | 0–1 | 2–2 |
| Rennes | 2–0 | 2–3 | 1–0 | 1–0 | 1–1 | 2–2 | 2–1 | 3–1 | 3–0 | 4–4 | 2–1 | 1–1 | 0–0 | 1–0 | 1–0 | | 1–0 | 1–0 | 0–0 | 0–0 |
| Saint-Étienne | 2–0 | 1–1 | 3–2 | 0–2 | 2–0 | 1–1 | 2–1 | 1–4 | 0–1 | 0–3 | 2–0 | 0–0 | 2–1 | 0–1 | 1–0 | 0–3 | | 2–1 | 2–2 | 4–0 |
| Sochaux | 0–1 | 0–0 | 2–2 | 1–2 | 1–1 | 2–1 | 1–1 | 1–1 | 0–2 | 1–0 | 3–0 | 2–1 | 2–1 | 1–0 | 1–1 | 3–0 | 1–0 | | 1–2 | 1–1 |
| Toulouse | 1–0 | 3–0 | 0–1 | 2–0 | 2–1 | 2–0 | 0–0 | 1–1 | 0–0 | 0–0 | 0–0 | 3–0 | 1–0 | 2–2 | 4–1 | 0–0 | 3–1 | 2–1 | | 0–0 |
| Valenciennes | 2–0 | 1–2 | 2–0 | 1–1 | 3–2 | 0–2 | 2–0 | 3–1 | 2–0 | 1–3 | 3–1 | 0–1 | 1–1 | 1–0 | 2–1 | 0–0 | 1–0 | 2–2 | 0–1 | |

Source: Ligue 1
Legend: Blue = home team win; Yellow = draw; Red = away team win.

== Season statistics ==
=== Top goalscorers ===
Source: Ligue 1 (in French)

André-Pierre Gignac won the Trophée du Meilleur Buteur.

| Rank | Player | Club | Goals |
|---|---|---|---|
| 1 | (France) André-Pierre Gignac | Toulouse | 24 |
| 2 | (France) Karim Benzema | Lyon | 17 |
| 2 | (France) Guillaume Hoarau | Paris Saint-Germain | 17 |
| 4 | (Brazil) Michel Bastos | Lille | 14 |
| 4 | (Poland) Ireneusz Jeleń | Auxerre | 14 |
| 4 | (France) Steve Savidan | Caen | 14 |
| 7 | (Argentina) Fernando Cavenaghi | Bordeaux | 13 |
| 7 | (Morocco) Marouane Chamakh | Bordeaux | 13 |
| 7 | (Senegal) Mamadou Niang | Marseille | 13 |
| 10 | (France) Yoann Gourcuff | Bordeaux | 12 |

== Awards ==
=== Monthly awards ===
==== UNFP Player of the Month ====
| Month | Player | Club |
|---|---|---|
| August | (France) Steve Mandanda | Marseille |
| September | (France) André-Pierre Gignac | Toulouse |
| October | (France) Guillaume Hoarau | Paris Saint-Germain |
| November | (France) Olivier Echouafni | Nice |
| December | (Benin) Stéphane Sessègnon | Paris Saint-Germain |
| January | (France) Péguy Luyindula | Paris Saint-Germain |
| February | (France) Guillaume Hoarau | Paris Saint-Germain |
| March | (France) André-Pierre Gignac | Toulouse |
| April | (France) Yoann Gourcuff | Bordeaux |

=== Annual Awards ===
| Award | Winner | Club | Ref. |
|---|---|---|---|
| Player of the Season | (France) Yoann Gourcuff | Girondins de Bordeaux | |
| Young Player of the Season | (Belgium) Eden Hazard | Lille | |
| Goalkeeper of the Season | (France) Hugo Lloris | Olympique Lyonnais | |
| Goal of the Season | (France) Yoann Gourcuff | Girondins de Bordeaux | |
| Manager of the Season | (Belgium) Eric Gerets | Olympique de Marseille | |

==== Team of the Year ====

Ligue 1 Team of the Year

Team of the Year
| Goalkeeper | (France) Hugo Lloris (Lyon) | | | |
| Defenders | (France) Rod Fanni (Rennes) | (Brazil) Vitorino Hilton (Marseille) | (Senegal) Souleymane Diawara (Bordeaux) | (Nigeria) Taye Taiwo (Marseille) |
| Midfielders | (France) Benoît Cheyrou (Marseille) | (Brazil) Michel Bastos (Lille) | (France) Yoann Gourcuff (Bordeaux) | (Benin) Stéphane Sessègnon (Paris Saint-Germain) |
| Forwards | (France) Guillaume Hoarau (Paris Saint-Germain) | (France) André-Pierre Gignac (Toulouse) | | |

== Attendances ==
| No. | Club | Average attendance | Change | Highest |
|---|---|---|---|---|
| 1 | Olympique de Marseille | 52,276 | -0.6% | 56,953 |
| 2 | Paris Saint-Germain FC | 40,902 | 10.7% | 45,774 |
| 3 | Olympique lyonnais | 37,395 | 0.3% | 40,245 |
| 4 | AS Saint-Étienne | 28,171 | -3.7% | 34,734 |
| 5 | Girondins de Bordeaux | 26,963 | 5.8% | 32,858 |
| 6 | FC Nantes | 24,138 | 6.0% | 35,993 |
| 7 | Stade rennais | 24,063 | -6.2% | 28,879 |
| 8 | Toulouse FC | 20,090 | -0.4% | 33,572 |
| 9 | SM Caen | 18,914 | -3.8% | 20,924 |
| 10 | AS Nancy | 18,001 | -4.0% | 20,017 |
| 11 | LOSC | 17,911 | 3.9% | 78,056 |
| 12 | Grenoble Foot 38 | 17,217 | 72.2% | 19,648 |
| 13 | FC Sochaux | 14,660 | -8.0% | 19,972 |
| 14 | Le Havre AC | 13,568 | 16.6% | 16,378 |
| 15 | AJ auxerroise | 12,914 | 21.9% | 20,002 |
| 16 | Valenciennes FC | 12,866 | -6.8% | 16,192 |
| 17 | FC Lorient | 11,401 | -7.3% | 14,621 |
| 18 | OGC Nice | 10,631 | -5.8% | 16,669 |
| 19 | Le Mans FC | 10,411 | -5.9% | 16,221 |
| 20 | AS Monaco | 8,512 | -21.4% | 16,904 |
