= 2006–07 FC Girondins de Bordeaux season =

Bordeaux
2006–07 season
- President: Jean-Louis Triaud
- Head coach: Ricardo Gomes
- Stadium: Stade Chaban-Delmas
- Ligue 1: 6th
- Coupe de France: Round of 16
- Coupe de la Ligue: Winners
- Champions League: Group stage
- UEFA Cup: Round of 32
- Average home league attendance: 24,909
Home colours	Away colours

The 2006–07 season is the 126th season in the existence of FC Girondins de Bordeaux and the club's 44th consecutive season in the top-flight of French football. In addition to the domestic league, Bordeaux participated in this season's editions of the Coupe de France, the Coupe de la Ligue, the UEFA Champions League and UEFA Cup.

== First-team squad ==
Squad at end of season

Note: Flags indicate national team as defined under FIFA eligibility rules; some limited exceptions apply. Players may hold more than one non-FIFA nationality.

No.	Pos.	Nation	Player
1	GK	FRA	Kévin Olimpa (Note: Olimpa was born in Paris, France, and represented them at U-21 level, but also qualified to represent Martinique internationally and would make his international debut for Martinique in 2012.)
2	DF	FRA	Paul Baysse
3	DF	BRA	Henrique
4	MF	ARG	Christian Peruchini
5	MF	BRA	Fernando Menegazzo
6	DF	FRA	Franck Jurietti
7	FW	ARG	Fernando Cavenaghi
8	MF	ARG	Alejandro Alonso
9	FW	FRA	Jean-Claude Darcheville (Note: Darcheville was born in Sinnamary, French Guiana, but represented France at U-21 level before making his international debut for French Guiana in 2012.)
10	MF	ARG	Juan Pablo Francia
11	MF	CZE	Vladimír Šmicer
12	FW	COL	Edixon Perea
13	DF	TUN	David Jemmali (Note: Jemmali was born in Toulouse, France, but also qualified to represent Tunisia internationally and made his international debut for Tunisia in March 2006.)
14	MF	FRA	Johan Micoud
15	FW	BRA	Jussiê (on loan from Lens)
16	GK	FRA	Ulrich Ramé

No.	Pos.	Nation	Player
17	MF	BRA	Wendel
18	MF	FRA	Julien Faubert (Note: Faubert was born in Le Havre, France, and represented them at U-21 level before making his international debut for France in August 2006, but also qualified to represent Martinique internationally and would make his international debut for Martinique in October 2014.)
19	MF	FRA	Pierre Ducasse
20	MF	FRA	Stéphane Dalmat
21	DF	NGA	Joseph Enakarhire (on loan from Dynamo Moscow)
23	DF	FRA	Florian Marange
24	MF	FRA	Rio Mavuba (Note: Mavuba was born in international waters to a Zairian father and Angolan mother, and did not hold nationality of any country until he obtained French citizenship in September 2004. He represented France at U-21 level before making his international debut for France in August 2004.)
25	DF	FRA	Gérald Cid
26	MF	FRA	Gabriel Obertan
27	DF	FRA	Marc Planus
28	DF	FRA	Benoît Trémoulinas
29	FW	MAR	Marouane Chamakh (Note: Chamakh was born in Tonneins, France, and represented them at U-19 level, but also qualified to represent Morocco internationally and made his international debut for Morocco in June 2003.)
30	GK	FRA	Mathieu Valverde
34	DF	FRA	Romain Brégerie
40	GK	FRA	Damien Dropsy

=== Left club during season ===
Note: Flags indicate national team as defined under FIFA eligibility rules; some limited exceptions apply. Players may hold more than one non-FIFA nationality.

No.	Pos.	Nation	Player
4	DF	POR	Beto (on loan to Recreativo de Huelva)
7	FW	FRA	Lilian Laslandes (to Nice)

No.	Pos.	Nation	Player
15	MF	FRA	Ted Lavie (on loan to Gueugnon)

== Competitions ==
=== Overview ===
Competition	First match	Last match	Starting round	Final position	Record							
Competition	First match	Last match	Starting round	Final position	Pld	W	D	L	GF	GA	GD	Win %
Ligue 1	5 August 2006	26 May 2007	Matchday 1	6th	38	16	9	13	39	35	+4	42.11
Coupe de France	6 January 2007	31 January 2007	Round of 64	Round of 16	3	1	2	0	7	5	+2	33.33
Coupe de la Ligue	25 October 2006	31 March 2007	Round of 16	Winners	4	4	0	0	5	1	+4	100.00
Champions League	25 October 2006	17 January 2006	Group stage	Group stage	6	2	1	3	6	7	−1	33.33
UEFA Cup	14 February 2007	22 February 2007	Round of 32	Round of 32	2	0	1	1	0	1	−1	0.00
Total					53	23	13	17	57	49	+8	43.40

Source: Competitions

=== Ligue 1 ===
==== League table ====
Pos	Team	Pld	W	D	L	GF	GA	GD	Pts	Qualification or relegation
4	Rennes	38	14	15	9	38	30	+8	57	Qualification to UEFA Cup first round
5	Lens	38	15	12	11	47	41	+6	57	Qualification to Intertoto Cup third round
6	Bordeaux	38	16	9	13	39	35	+4	57	Qualification to UEFA Cup first round (Note: Bordeaux, the winner of the Coupe de la Ligue, is awarded entry to the 2007–08 UEFA Cup. The winners of the Coupe de France, Sochaux also have been awarded entry to the 2007–08 UEFA Cup.)
7	Sochaux	38	15	12	11	46	48	−2	57	Qualification to UEFA Cup first round
8	Auxerre	38	13	15	10	41	41	0	54	

Source: Ligue 1
Rules for classification: 1) points; 2) goal difference; 3) number of goals scored.

==== Results summary ====
Overall								Home						Away					
Pld	W	D	L	GF	GA	GD	Pts	W	D	L	GF	GA	GD	W	D	L	GF	GA	GD
38	16	9	13	39	35	+4	57	12	3	4	25	12	+13	4	6	9	14	23	−9

Source: Ligue 1

==== Results by round ====
Round	1	2	3	4	5	6	7	8	9	10	11	12	13	14	15	16	17	18	19	20	21	22	23	24	25	26	27	28	29	30	31	32	33	34	35	36	37	38
Ground	H	A	H	A	H	A	H	A	H	A	H	A	H	A	H	A	H	A	H	H	A	H	A	H	A	H	A	H	A	H	A	H	A	H	A	H	A	A
Result	W	W	L	L	W	L	W	L	W	L	W	L	D	W	W	L	L	D	W	D	W	L	L	W	L	W	D	W	D	W	D	D	W	W	D	L	D	L
Position	2	3	5	10	6	9	7	10	5	9	8	9	10	8	6	7	8	8	8	8	7	7	9	7	9	7	6	5	3	5	7	7	3	2	3	4	4	6

Source: Ligue 1
A = Away; H = Home; W = Win; D = Draw; L = Loss

==== Matches ====
5 August 2006 1	Bordeaux	2–0	Toulouse	Bordeaux
20:00 CEST (UTC+2)		Report		Stadium: Stade Chaban-Delmas

12 August 2006 2	Lorient	0–1	Bordeaux	Lorient
17:15 CEST (UTC+2)		Report		Stadium: Stade du Moustoir

20 August 2006 3	Bordeaux	1–2	Lyon	Bordeaux
21:00 CEST (UTC+2)		Report		Stadium: Stade Chaban-Delmas

26 August 2006 4	Lille	3–0	Bordeaux	Villeneuve-d'Ascq
20:00 CEST (UTC+2)		Report		Stadium: Stadium Lille Métropole

9 September 2006 5	Bordeaux	3–2	Nice	Bordeaux
17:15 CEST (UTC+2)		Report		Stadium: Stade Chaban-Delmas

17 September 2006 6	Marseille	2–1	Bordeaux	Marseille
21:00 CEST (UTC+2)		Report		Stadium: Stade Vélodrome

23 September 2006 7	Bordeaux	2–1	Troyes	Bordeaux
20:00 CEST (UTC+2)		Report		Stadium: Stade Chaban-Delmas

30 September 2006 8	Valenciennes	2–0	Bordeaux	Valenciennes
20:00 CEST (UTC+2)		Report		Stadium: Stade du Hainaut

14 October 2006 9	Bordeaux	1–0	Monaco	Bordeaux
20:00 CEST (UTC+2)		Report		Stadium: Stade Chaban-Delmas

21 October 2006 10	Sochaux	2–1	Bordeaux	Bordeaux
20:00 CEST (UTC+2)		Report		Stadium: Stade Chaban-Delmas

28 October 2006 11	Bordeaux	3–1	Sedan	Bordeaux
20:00 CEST (UTC+2)		Report		Stadium: Stade Chaban-Delmas

5 November 2006 12	Nancy	2–1	Bordeaux	Tomblaine
18:30 CET (UTC+1)		Report		Stadium: Stade Marcel Picot

11 November 2006 13	Bordeaux	0–0	Auxerre	Bordeaux
17:15 CET (UTC+1)		Report		Stadium: Stade Chaban-Delmas

18 November 2006 14	Paris Saint-Germain	0–2	Bordeaux	Paris
20:30 CET (UTC+1)		Report		Stadium: Parc des Princes

25 November 2006 15	Bordeaux	1–0	Saint-Étienne	Bordeaux
20:00 CET (UTC+1)		Report		Stadium: Stade Chaban-Delmas

2 December 2006 16	Lens	3–0	Bordeaux	Lens
20:00 CET (UTC+1)		Report		Stadium: Stade Bollaert-Delelis

9 December 2006 17	Bordeaux	1–2	Rennes	Bordeaux
20:00 CET (UTC+1)		Report		Stadium: Stade Chaban-Delmas

16 December 2006 18	Nantes	0–0	Bordeaux	Nantes
20:00 CET (UTC+1)		Report		Stadium: Stade de la Beaujoire

23 December 2006 19	Bordeaux	1–0	Le Mans	Bordeaux
20:00 CET (UTC+1)		Report		Stadium: Stade Chaban-Delmas

13 January 2007 20	Bordeaux	1–1	Lorient	Bordeaux
20:00 CET (UTC+1)		Report		Stadium: Stade Chaban-Delmas

24 January 2007 21	Lyon	1–2	Bordeaux	Lyon
20:45 CET (UTC+1)		Report		Stadium: Stade de Gerland

27 January 2007 22	Bordeaux	0–1	Lille	Bordeaux
20:00 CET (UTC+1)		Report		Stadium: Stade Chaban-Delmas

3 February 2007 23	Nice	2–1	Bordeaux	Nice
20:00 CET (UTC+1)		Report		Stadium: Stade du Ray

11 February 2007 24	Bordeaux	1–0	Marseille	Bordeaux
21:00 CET (UTC+1)		Report		Stadium: Stade Chaban-Delmas

17 February 2007 25	Troyes	1–0	Bordeaux	Troyes
20:00 CET (UTC+1)		Report		Stadium: Stade de l'Aube

25 February 2007 26	Bordeaux	2–1	Valenciennes	Bordeaux
19:00 CET (UTC+1)		Report		Stadium: Stade Chaban-Delmas

3 March 2007 27	Monaco	0–0	Bordeaux	Monaco
20:00 CET (UTC+1)		Report		Stadium: Stade Louis II

10 March 2007 28	Bordeaux	2–0	Sochaux	Bordeaux
20:00 CET (UTC+1)		Report		Stadium: Stade Chaban-Delmas

17 March 2007 29	Sedan	1–1	Bordeaux	Sedan
20:00 CET (UTC+1)		Report		Stadium: Stade Louis Dugauguez

7 April 2007 31	Auxerre	0–0	Bordeaux	Auxerre
20:00 CEST (UTC+2)		Report		Stadium: Stade de l'Abbé-Deschamps

14 April 2007 32	Bordeaux	0–0	Paris Saint-Germain	Bordeaux
17:10 CEST (UTC+2)		Report		Stadium: Stade Chaban-Delmas

18 April 2007 30	Bordeaux	3–0	Nancy	Bordeaux
19:00 CEST (UTC+2)		Report		Stadium: Stade Chaban-Delmas

22 April 2007 33	Saint-Étienne	0–2	Bordeaux	Saint-Étienne
21:05 CEST (UTC+2)		Report		Stadium: Stade Geoffroy-Guichard

29 April 2007 34	Bordeaux	1–0	Lens	Bordeaux
18:00 CEST (UTC+2)		Report		Stadium: Stade Chaban-Delmas

5 May 2007 35	Rennes	0–0	Bordeaux	Rennes
20:00 CEST (UTC+2)		Report		Stadium: Stade de la Route de Lorient

9 May 2007 36	Bordeaux	0–1	Nantes	Bordeaux
20:30 CEST (UTC+2)		Report		Stadium: Stade Chaban-Delmas

19 May 2007 37	Le Mans	1–1	Bordeaux	Le Mans
20:45 CEST (UTC+2)		Report		Stadium: Stade Léon-Bollée

26 May 2007 38	Toulouse	3–1	Bordeaux	Toulouse
20:45 CEST (UTC+2)		Report		Stadium: Stadium de Toulouse

=== Coupe de France ===
6 January 2007 Round of 64	Bordeaux	2–0	Bastia	Bordeaux
21:00 CET (UTC+1)				Stadium: Stade Chaban-Delmas

20 January 2007 Round of 32	Bordeaux	3–3 (a.e.t.) (5–4 p)	Niort	Bordeaux
18:00 CET (UTC+1)				Stadium: Stade Chaban-Delmas

31 January 2007 Round of 16	Montceau	2–2 (a.e.t.) (5–4 p)	Bordeaux	Gueugnon
19:00 CET (UTC+1)				Stadium: Stade Jean Laville

=== Coupe de la Ligue ===
25 October 2006 Round of 16	Auxerre	0–1	Bordeaux	Auxerre
20:00 CEST (UTC+2)			Darcheville 23'	Stadium: Stade de l'Abbé-Deschamps; Attendance: 6,704; Referee: Tony Chapron

19 December 2006 Quarter-finals	Bordeaux	1–0 (a.e.t.)	Saint-Étienne	Bordeaux
21:00 CET (UTC+1)	Fernando 99' (pen.)			Stadium: Stade Chaban-Delmas; Attendance: 14,234; Referee: Bertrand Layec

16 January 2007 Semi-finals	Reims	1–2	Bordeaux	Reims
21:00 CET (UTC+1)	Jemmali 85' (o.g.)		Marange 58'; Darcheville 75' (pen.)	Stadium: Stade Auguste Delaune; Attendance: 8,693; Referee: Laurent Duhamel

31 March 2007 Final	Lyon	0–1	Bordeaux	Saint-Denis
20:45 CEST (UTC+2)			Henrique 89'	Stadium: Stade de France; Attendance: 79,072; Referee: Hervé Piccirillo

=== Champions League ===
==== Group stage ====
Pos	Team	Pld	W	D	L	GF	GA	GD	Pts	Qualification
1	(England) Liverpool	6	4	1	1	11	5	+6	13	Advance to knockout stage
2	(Netherlands) PSV Eindhoven	6	3	1	2	6	6	0	10	Advance to knockout stage
3	(France) Bordeaux	6	2	1	3	6	7	−1	7	Transfer to UEFA Cup
4	(Turkey) Galatasaray	6	1	1	4	7	12	−5	4	

Source: RSSSF

12 September 2006 1	Galatasaray (Turkey)	0–0	(France) Bordeaux	Istanbul, Turkey
20:45 CEST (UTC+2)		Report		Stadium: Atatürk Olympic Stadium; Attendance: 71,230; Referee: Roberto Rosetti (Italy)

27 September 2006 2	Bordeaux (France)	0–1	(Netherlands) PSV Eindhoven	Bordeaux, France
20:45 CEST (UTC+2)		Report	Väyrynen 65'	Stadium: Stade Chaban-Delmas; Attendance: 23,500; Referee: Olegário Benquerença (Portugal)

18 October 2006 3	Bordeaux (France)	0–1	(England) Liverpool	Bordeaux, France
20:45 CEST (UTC+2)		Report	Crouch 58'	Stadium: Stade Chaban-Delmas; Attendance: 31,471; Referee: Tom Henning Øvrebø (Norway)

31 October 2006 4	Liverpool (England)	3–0	(France) Bordeaux	Liverpool, England
20:45 CET (UTC+1)	L. García 23', 76'; Gerrard 71'	Report		Stadium: Anfield; Attendance: 41,978; Referee: Markus Merk (Germany)

22 November 2006 5	Bordeaux (France)	3–1	(Turkey) Galatasaray	Bordeaux, France
20:45 CET (UTC+1)	Alonso 22'; Laslandes 47'; Faubert 50'	Report	Inamoto 73'	Stadium: Stade Chaban-Delmas; Attendance: 22,834; Referee: Vladimír Hriňák (Slovakia)

5 December 2006 6	PSV Eindhoven (Netherlands)	1–3	(France) Bordeaux	Eindhoven, Netherlands
20:45 CET (UTC+1)	Alex 87'	Report	Faubert 7'; Dalmat 25'; Darcheville 37'	Stadium: Philips Stadion; Attendance: 30,000; Referee: Manuel Mejuto González (Spain)

=== UEFA Cup ===
==== Knockout phase ====
===== Round of 32 =====
14 February 2007 First leg	Bordeaux (France)	0–0	(Spain) Osasuna	Bordeaux, France
18:00 CET (UTC+1)		Report		Stadium: Stade Chaban-Delmas; Attendance: 16,026; Referee: Alon Yefet (Israel)

22 February 2007 Second leg	Osasuna (Spain)	1–0 (1–0 agg.)	(France) Bordeaux	Pamplona, Spain
20:45 CET (UTC+1)	Nekounam 120'	Report		Stadium: Estadio Reyno de Navarra; Attendance: 19,200; Referee: Domenico Messina (Italy)
