= 2006–07 Olympique Lyonnais season =

Lyon
2006–07 season
- Owner: OL Groupe
- President: Jean-Michel Aulas
- Head coach: Gérard Houllier
- Stadium: Stade de Gerland
- Ligue 1: 1st
- Coupe de France: Round of 16
- Coupe de la Ligue: Runners-up
- Trophée des Champions: Winners
- Champions League: Round of 16
- Top goalscorer: League: Fred (11); All: Fred (14)
- Highest home attendance: 40,520 vs. Dynamo Kyiv (1 November 2006)
- Lowest home attendance: 33,971 vs. Nice (27 January 2007)
- Average home league attendance: 38,546
Home colours	Away colours	Third colours

The 2006–07 season was the 108th season in the existence of Olympique Lyonnais and the club's 18th consecutive season in the top flight of French football. They participated in the Ligue 1, the Coupe de France, the Coupe de la Ligue, the Trophée des Champions and UEFA Champions League.

== Season summary ==
Lyon won their sixth consecutive title, becoming the first club from the top five European leagues to win six league titles in a row.

== First-team squad ==
Squad at end of season

Note: Flags indicate national team as defined under FIFA eligibility rules; some limited exceptions apply. Players may hold more than one non-FIFA nationality.

No.	Pos.	Nation	Player
1	GK	FRA	Grégory Coupet
2	DF	FRA	François Clerc
3	DF	BRA	Cris
4	DF	SUI	Patrick Müller
5	DF	BRA	Caçapa (captain)
6	MF	SWE	Kim Källström
7	MF	MLI	Mahamadou Diarra
8	MF	BRA	Juninho Pernambucano
9	FW	NOR	John Carew
10	MF	FRA	Florent Malouda
11	FW	BRA	Fred
12	DF	FRA	Anthony Réveillère
14	MF	FRA	Sidney Govou
15	MF	FRA	Alou Diarra
17	FW	CZE	Milan Baroš
18	MF	FRA	Hatem Ben Arfa

No.	Pos.	Nation	Player
19	FW	FRA	Karim Benzema
20	DF	FRA	Eric Abidal
21	MF	POR	Tiago
22	FW	FRA	Sylvain Wiltord
23	DF	FRA	Jérémy Berthod
25	GK	FRA	Joan Hartock
26	MF	BRA	Fábio Santos
28	MF	FRA	Jérémy Toulalan
29	DF	FRA	Sébastien Squillaci
30	GK	FRA	Rémy Vercoutre
34	FW	FRA	Loïc Rémy
35	GK	FRA	Alexandre Bouchard
36	FW	CHA	Sylvain Idangar
38	DF	FRA	Mourad Benhamida
39	FW	FRA	Grégory Bettiol

=== Left club during season ===
Note: Flags indicate national team as defined under FIFA eligibility rules; some limited exceptions apply. Players may hold more than one non-FIFA nationality.

No.	Pos.	Nation	Player
7	MF	MLI	Mahamadou Diarra (to Real Madrid)
9	FW	NOR	John Carew (to Aston Villa)
15	DF	SEN	Lamine Diatta (to Saint-Étienne)
26	MF	FRA	Benoît Pedretti (to Auxerre)

No.	Pos.	Nation	Player
26	DF	ALG	Nadir Belhadj (Note: Belhadj was born in Saint-Claude, France, and represented them at U-18 level, but also qualifies to represent Algeria internationally through his parents and made his international debut for Algeria in March 2004.) (on loan to Sedan)
31	MF	ALG	Yacine Hima (Note: Hima was born in Lyon, France, but also qualified to represent Algeria internationally and made his international debut for Algeria in 2006.) (to Nice)
35	GK	FRA	Rémy Riou (on loan to Lorient)

== Competitions ==
=== Overview ===
Competition	First match	Last match	Starting round	Final position	Record							
Competition	First match	Last match	Starting round	Final position	Pld	W	D	L	GF	GA	GD	Win %
Ligue 1	4 August 2006	26 May 2007	Matchday 1	Winners	38	24	9	5	64	27	+37	63.16
Coupe de France	7 January 2007	31 January 2007	Round of 64	Round of 16	4	3	0	1	6	4	+2	75.00
Coupe de la Ligue	25 October 2006	31 March 2007	Round of 16	Runners-up	4	3	0	1	6	3	+3	75.00
Trophée des Champions	30 July 2006		Final	Winners	1	0	1	0	1	1	+0	0.00
UEFA Champions League	13 September 2006	6 March 2007	Group stage	Round of 16	8	4	3	1	12	5	+7	50.00
Total					55	34	13	8	89	40	+49	61.82

Source: Competitions

=== Trophée des Champions ===
30 July 2006 Final	Lyon	1–1 (5–4 p)	Paris Saint-Germain	Lyon
	Benzema 71' (pen.)		Rothen 62'	Stadium: Stade Gerland; Attendance: 30,529; Referee: Bertrand Layec
	Penalties
	Carew (penalty scored); Toulalan (penalty scored); Ben Arfa (penalty scored); Benzema (penalty scored); Diarra (penalty scored)		(penalty scored) Yepes; (penalty scored) Paulo César; (penalty scored) Frau; (penalty scored) Rothen; (penalty missed) Kalou

=== Ligue 1 ===
==== League table ====
Pos	Team	Pld	W	D	L	GF	GA	GD	Pts	Qualification or relegation
1	Lyon (C)	38	24	9	5	64	27	+37	81	Qualification to Champions League group stage
2	Marseille	38	19	7	12	53	38	+15	64	Qualification to Champions League group stage
3	Toulouse	38	17	7	14	44	43	+1	58	Qualification to Champions League third qualifying round
4	Rennes	38	14	15	9	38	30	+8	57	Qualification to UEFA Cup first round
5	Lens	38	15	12	11	47	41	+6	57	Qualification to Intertoto Cup third round

Source: Ligue 1
Rules for classification: 1) points; 2) goal difference; 3) number of goals scored.
(C) Champions

==== Results summary ====
Overall								Home						Away					
Pld	W	D	L	GF	GA	GD	Pts	W	D	L	GF	GA	GD	W	D	L	GF	GA	GD
38	24	9	5	64	27	+37	81	12	6	1	32	14	+18	12	3	4	32	13	+19

Source: Soccerway

==== Results by match ====
Match	1	2	3	4	5	6	7	8	9	10	11	12	13	14	15	16	17	18	19	20	21	22	23	24	25	26	27	28	29	30	31	32	33	34	35	36	37	38
Ground	A	H	A	A	H	A	H	A	H	A	H	A	H	A	H	A	H	A	H	A	H	H	A	H	H	A	H	A	H	A	H	A	H	A	H	A	H	A
Result	W	D	W	W	W	W	W	W	W	W	W	L	W	W	W	W	W	W	D	L	L	D	L	W	W	D	W	D	W	D	W	D	D	W	D	W	L	W
Position	1	4	2	2	2	1	1	1	1	1	1	1	1	1	1	1	1	1	1	1	1	1	1	1	1	1	1	1	1	1	1	1	1	1	1	1	1	1

Source: [[[Category:All articles with unsourced statements]]
A = Away; H = Home; W = Win; D = Draw; L = Loss
Notes: Match 30 versus Rennes was postponed until 18 April 2007 and therefore should appear between matches 31 & 32.

==== Matches ====
4 August 2006 1	Nantes	1–3	Lyon	Nantes
21:00 CEST	Boukhari 4'		Benzema 6'; Squillaci 63'; Fred 88'	Stadium: Stade de la Beaujoire; Attendance: 35,828; Referee: Stéphane Lannoy

12 August 2006 2	Lyon	1–1	Toulouse	Lyon
20:00 CEST	Malouda 83'		Fabinho 90+1'	Stadium: Stade de Gerland; Attendance: 39,280; Referee: Philippe Malige

20 August 2006 3	Bordeaux	1–2	Lyon	Bordeaux
21:00 CEST	Faubert 5'		Fred 28'; Wiltord 86'	Stadium: Stade Chaban-Delmas; Attendance: 32,008; Referee: Stéphane Bre

26 August 2006 4	Nice	1–4	Lyon	Nice
17:15 CEST	Vahirua 27'		Malouda 49'; Benzema 69', 90+1'; Tiago 74'	Stadium: Stade du Ray; Attendance: 13,814; Referee: Hervé Piccirillo

9 September 2006 5	Lyon	2–0	Troyes	Lyon
20:00 CEST	Cris 16'; Juninho 86'			Stadium: Stade de Gerland; Attendance: 37,391; Referee: Olivier Thual

16 September 2006 6	Lorient	1–3	Lyon	Lorient
20:00 CEST	Ciani 69'		Tiago 6'; Fred 62'; Malouda 65'	Stadium: Stade du Moustoir; Attendance: 15,230; Referee: Alain Hamer

23 September 2006 7	Lyon	4–1	Lille	Lyon
17:15 CEST	Malouda 6'; Juninho 52'; Fred 64', 70'		Cris 24' (o.g.)	Stadium: Stade de Gerland; Attendance: 40,165; Referee: Thierry Auriac

30 September 2006 8	Sochaux	0–1	Lyon	Montbéliard
17:15 CEST			Wiltord 78'	Stadium: Stade Auguste Bonal; Attendance: 18,788; Referee: Bruno Coué

14 October 2006 9	Lyon	2–1	Saint-Étienne	Lyon
17:00 CEST	Tiago 65'; Juninho 88'		Hautcœur 67'; Diatta (red card) 81'	Stadium: Stade de Gerland; Attendance: 39,218; Referee: Laurent Duhamel

22 October 2006 10	Marseille	1–4	Lyon	Marseille
21:00 CEST	Taiwo (red card) 56'; Bamogo 70'		Juninho 20', 78'; Benzema 48'; Källström 87'	Stadium: Stade Vélodrome; Attendance: 57,376; Referee: Bertrand Layec

29 October 2006 11	Lyon	1–0	Nancy	Lyon
21:00 CET	Carew 13'			Stadium: Stade de Gerland; Attendance: 40,298; Referee: Philippe Kalt

4 November 2006 12	Rennes	1–0	Lyon	Rennes
17:15 CET	M'Bia 13'		Juninho (red card) 78'	Stadium: Stade de la Route de Lorient; Attendance: 28,499; Referee: Olivier Thual

10 November 2006 13	Lyon	2–1	Valenciennes	Lyon
20:30 CET	Cris 84'; Squillaci 86'		Savidan 75'	Stadium: Stade de Gerland; Attendance: 39,833; Referee: Lionel Jaffredo

18 November 2006 14	Sedan	0–1	Lyon	Sedan
20:30 CET			Abdou 79' (o.g.)	Stadium: Stade Louis Dugauguez; Attendance: 21,025; Referee: Stéphane Bre

26 November 2006 15	Lyon	1–0	Auxerre	Lyon
21:00 CET	Malouda 25'			Stadium: Stade de Gerland; Attendance: 39,576; Referee: Fredy Fautrel

2 December 2006 16	Le Mans	0–1	Lyon	Le Mans
17:15 CET			Wiltord 57'	Stadium: Stade Léon-Bollée; Attendance: 14,432; Referee: Lionel Jaffredo

10 December 2006 17	Lyon	3–1	Paris Saint-Germain	Lyon
21:00 CET	Wiltord 45'; Cris 87'; Malouda 88'		Pauleta 60'	Stadium: Stade de Gerland; Attendance: 36,072; Referee: Alain Hamer

17 December 2006 18	Lens	0–4	Lyon	Lens
21:00 CET			Juninho 23', 62'; Malouda 34'; Cris 51'	Stadium: Stade Félix Bollaert; Attendance: 40,038; Referee: Laurent Duhamel

23 December 2006 19	Lyon	0–0	Monaco	Lyon
17:15 CET				Stadium: Stade de Gerland; Attendance: 38,225; Referee: Thierry Auriac

13 January 2007 20	Toulouse	2–0	Lyon	Toulouse
17:15 CET	Emana 63'; Elmander 84'			Stadium: Stadium de Toulouse; Attendance: 33,940; Referee: Stéphane Bré

24 January 2007 21	Lyon	1–2	Bordeaux	Lyon
20:45 CET	Fred 64'		Francia 3' (pen.); Micoud 27'	Stadium: Stade de Gerland; Attendance: 35,305; Referee: Stéphane Lannoy

27 January 2007 22	Lyon	1–1	Nice	Lyon
20:00 CET	Baroš 40'		Koné 35'	Stadium: Stade de Gerland; Attendance: 33,971; Referee: Olivier Thual

4 February 2007 23	Troyes	1–0	Lyon	Troyes
18:00 CET	Nivet 90+4'			Stadium: Stade de l'Aube; Attendance: 14,009; Referee: Damien Ledentu

10 February 2007 24	Lyon	1–0	Lorient	Lyon
20:00 CET	Fred 6'			Stadium: Stade de Gerland; Attendance: 37,976; Referee: Fredy Fautrel

16 February 2007 25	Lille	1–2	Lyon	Villeneuve-d'Ascq
21:00 CET	Audel 52'		Fred 83'; Squillaci 89'	Stadium: Stadium Lille Métropole; Attendance: 17,092; Referee: Thierry Auriac

24 February 2007 26	Lyon	3–3	Sochaux	Lyon
21:00 CET	Baroš 40'; Wiltord 90'; Juninho 90+3' (pen.)		Santos 9'; Ziani 29' (pen.); Grax 86'	Stadium: Stade de Gerland; Attendance: 40,363; Referee: Bertrand Layec

3 March 2007 27	Saint-Étienne	1–3	Lyon	Saint-Étienne
17:00 CET	Gomis 80'		Källström 28'; Tiago 37'; Fred 47'	Stadium: Stade Geoffroy-Guichard; Attendance: 35,201; Referee: Tony Chapron

11 March 2007 28	Lyon	1–1	Marseille	Lyon
21:00 CET	Baroš 19'		Niang 86'	Stadium: Stade de Gerland; Attendance: 38,930; Referee: Philippe Kalt

17 March 2007 29	Nancy	0–3	Lyon	Tomblaine
20:00 CET			Baroš 36'; Källström 76'; Fred 81'	Stadium: Stade Marcel Picot; Attendance: 19,919; Referee: Olivier Thual

7 April 2007 31	Valenciennes	0–0	Lyon	Valenciennes
17:10 CEST				Stadium: Stade Nungesser; Attendance: 15,999; Referee: Damien Ledentu

15 April 2007 32	Lyon	1–0	Sedan	Lyon
21:00 CEST	Ben Arfa 44'			Stadium: Stade de Gerland; Attendance: 37,539; Referee: Bruno Coué

18 April 2007 30	Lyon	0–0	Rennes	Lyon
19:00 CEST				Stadium: Stade de Gerland; Attendance: 39,848; Referee: Stéphane Lannoy

22 April 2007 33	Auxerre	0–0	Lyon	Auxerre
18:00 CEST				Stadium: Stade de l'Abbé-Deschamps; Attendance: 16,141; Referee: Laurent Duhamel

28 April 2007 34	Lyon	2–1	Le Mans	Lyon
20:00 CEST	Fred 39'; Malouda 68'		Grafite 64'	Stadium: Stade de Gerland; Attendance: 40,026; Referee: Stéphane Moulin

5 May 2007 35	Paris Saint-Germain	1–1	Lyon	Paris
17:10 CEST	Cissé 47'		Juninho 90+4'	Stadium: Parc des Princes; Attendance: 41,577; Referee: Olivier Thual

9 May 2007 36	Lyon	3–0	Lens	Lyon
20:45 CEST	Govou 21'; Juninho 38'; Diarra 45'			Stadium: Stade de Gerland; Attendance: 38,213; Referee: Sandryk Biton

19 May 2007 37	Monaco	1–0	Lyon	Monaco
20:45 CEST	Ménez 58'			Stadium: Stade Louis II; Attendance: 13,145; Referee: Damien Ledentu

26 May 2007 38	Lyon	3–1	Nantes	Lyon
20:45 CEST	Malouda 22', 66'; Benzema 83'		Diallo 51'	Stadium: Stade de Gerland; Attendance: 40,149; Referee: Bruno Coué

=== Coupe de France ===
7 January 2007 Round of 64	Aviron Bayonnais	1–2	Lyon	Bayonne
17:45 CET	Bidegain 59'		Degoul 10' (o.g.); Juninho 75'	Stadium: Stade Didier Deschamps; Attendance: 14,000; Referee: Jérome Auroux

20 January 2007 Round of 32	Laon	1–3	Lyon	Reims
17:00 CET	Koffman 19'		Clerc 27'; Govou 69'; Fred 85'	Stadium: Stade Auguste-Delaune; Attendance: 9,200; Referee: Lionel Jaffredo

31 January 2007 Round of 16	Marseille	2–1	Lyon	Marseille
21:00 CET	Pagis 87'; Niang 90+1'		Cris 17'	Stadium: Stade Vélodrome; Attendance: 57,346; Referee: Laurent Duhamel

=== Coupe de la Ligue ===
25 October 2006 Round of 16	Lyon	2–1	Paris Saint-Germain	Lyon
21:00 CET	Wiltord 88', 90'		Paulo Cesar 58'	Stadium: Stade de Gerland; Attendance: 35,816; Referee: Stéphane Bré

20 December 2006 Quarter-finals	Lyon	3–1	Nancy	Lyon
21:00 CET	Malouda 53'; Govou 78'; Diarra 90'		Zerka 65'	Stadium: Stade de Gerland; Attendance: 26,757; Referee: Damien Ledentu

17 January 2007 Semi-finals	Lyon	1–0	Le Mans	Lyon
21:00 CET	Abidal 22'		Cerdan (red card) 81'	Stadium: Stade de Gerland; Attendance: 27,541; Referee: Phillipe Kalt

31 March 2007 Final	Lyon	0–1	Bordeaux	Saint-Denis
21:00 CET			Henrique 89'	Stadium: Stade de France; Attendance: 79,072; Referee: Herve Piccarillo

=== Champions League ===
==== Group stage ====
Pos	Team	Pld	W	D	L	GF	GA	GD	Pts	Qualification
1	(France) Lyon	6	4	2	0	12	3	+9	14	Advance to knockout stage
2	(Spain) Real Madrid	6	3	2	1	14	8	+6	11	Advance to knockout stage
3	(Romania) Steaua București	6	1	2	3	7	11	−4	5	Transfer to UEFA Cup
4	(Ukraine) Dynamo Kyiv	6	0	2	4	5	16	−11	2	

Source: RSSSF

13 September 2006 1	Lyon (France)	2–0	(Spain) Real Madrid	Lyon, France
20:45	Fred 11'; Tiago 31'	Report		Stadium: Stade de Gerland; Attendance: 40,013; Referee: Wolfgang Stark (Germany)

26 September 2006 2	Steaua București (Romania)	0–3	(France) Lyon	Bucharest, Romania
20:45		Report	Fred 43'; Tiago 55'; Benzema 89'	Stadium: Stadionul Steaua; Attendance: 28,000; Referee: Howard Webb (England)

17 October 2006 3	Dynamo Kyiv (Ukraine)	0–3	(France) Lyon	Kyiv, Ukraine
20:45		Report	Juninho 31'; Källström 38'; Malouda 51'	Stadium: NSC Olimpiyskiy; Attendance: 33,500; Referee: Domenico Messina (Italy)

1 November 2006 4	Lyon (France)	1–0	(Ukraine) Dynamo Kyiv	Lyon, France
20:45	Benzema 14'	Report		Stadium: Stade de Gerland; Attendance: 40,520; Referee: Pieter Vink (Netherlands)

21 November 2006 5	Real Madrid (Spain)	2–2	(France) Lyon	Madrid, Spain
20:45	Diarra 39'; Van Nistelrooy 83'	Report	Carew 11'; Malouda 31'	Stadium: Santiago Bernabéu Stadium; Attendance: 85,000; Referee: Terje Hauge (Norway)

6 December 2006 6	Lyon (France)	1–1	(Romania) Steaua București	Lyon, France
20:45	Diarra 12'	Report	Dică 2'	Stadium: Stade de Gerland; Attendance: 39,351; Referee: Darko Čeferin (Slovenia)

==== Knockout phase ====
===== Round of 16 =====
21 February 2007 First leg	Roma (Italy)	0–0	(France) Lyon	Rome, Italy
20:45		Report		Stadium: Stadio Olimpico; Attendance: 55,000; Referee: Mike Riley (England)

6 March 2007 Second leg	Lyon (France)	0–2 (0–2 agg.)	(Italy) Roma	Lyon, France
20:45		Report	Totti 22'; Mancini 44'	Stadium: Stade de Gerland; Attendance: 39,260; Referee: Manuel Mejuto González (Spain)
