= 2006–07 Stade Rennais FC season =

Stade Rennais
2006–07 season
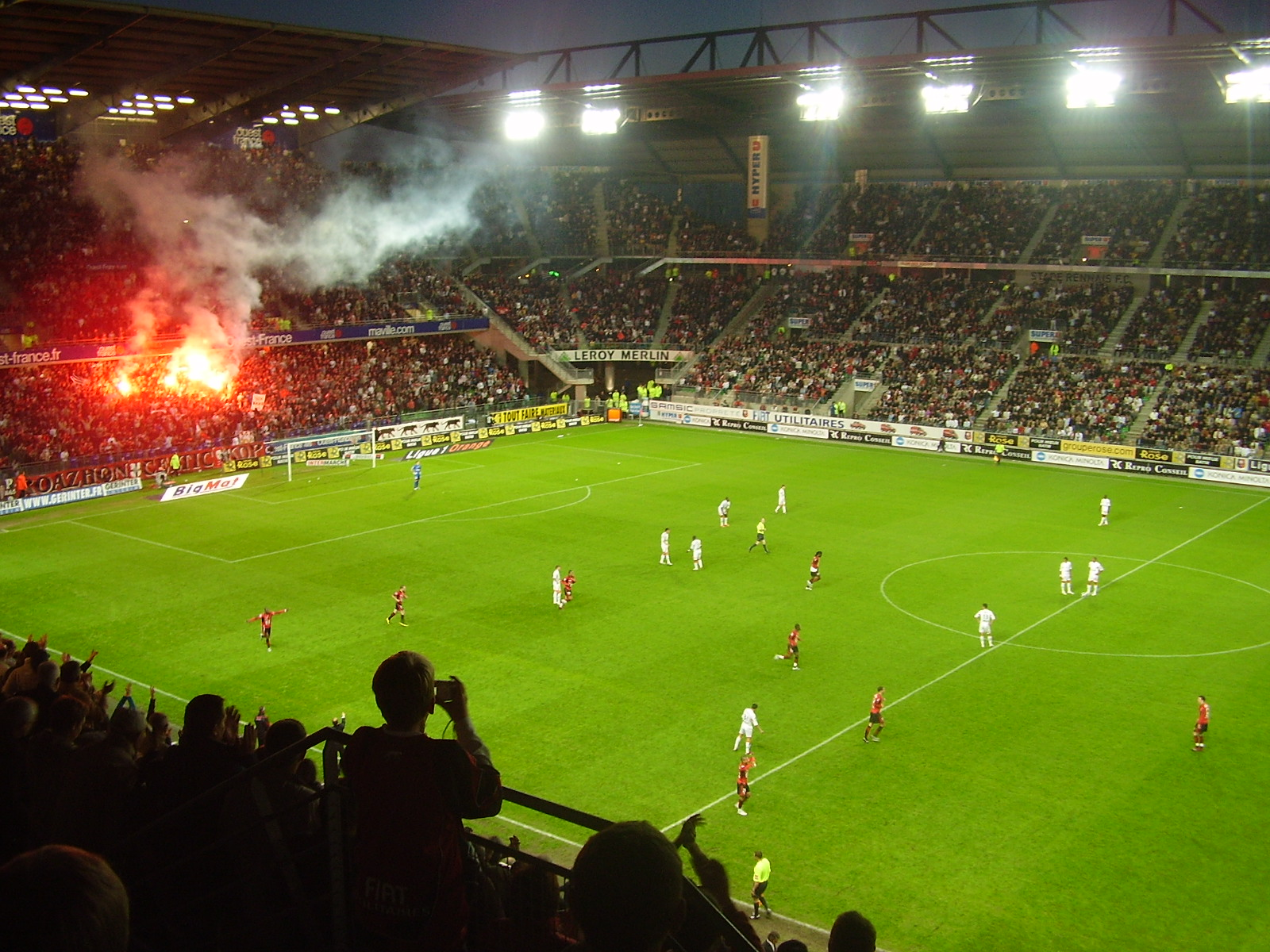
- Derby Breton
- President: René Ruello
- Head coach: Pierre Dréossi
- Stadium: Stade de la Route de Lorient
- Ligue 1: 4th
- Coupe de France: Round of 64
- Coupe de la Ligue: Quarter-finals
- Top goalscorer: League: John Utaka (11); All: John Utaka (12)
| Home colours | Away colours | Third colours |

The 2006–07 season was the 105th season in the history of Stade Rennais FC. It was the club's 13th consecutive season in the top flight of French football. In addition to the domestic league, Rennes participated in this season's editions of the Coupe de France and the Coupe de la Ligue. The season covered the period from 1 July 2006 to 30 June 2007.

== Competitions ==
=== Overall record ===
| Competition | First match | Last match | Starting round | Final position | Record | | | | | | | |
| Competition | First match | Last match | Starting round | Final position | Pld | W | D | L | GF | GA | GD | Win % |
|---|---|---|---|---|---|---|---|---|---|---|---|---|
| Ligue 1 | 5 August 2006 | 26 May 2007 | Matchday 1 | 4th | 38 | 14 | 15 | 9 | 38 | 30 | +8 | 36.84 |
| Coupe de France | 6 January 2007 | | Round of 64 | Round of 64 | 1 | 0 | 0 | 1 | 1 | 3 | −2 | 0.00 |
| Coupe de la Ligue | 20 September 2006 | 20 December 2006 | Third round | Quarter-finals | 3 | 2 | 0 | 1 | 4 | 2 | +2 | 66.67 |
| Total | | | | | 42 | 16 | 15 | 11 | 43 | 35 | +8 | 38.10 |

Source: Competitions

=== Ligue 1 ===
==== League table ====
| Pos | Team | Pld | W | D | L | GF | GA | GD | Pts | Qualification or relegation |
|---|---|---|---|---|---|---|---|---|---|---|
| 2 | Marseille | 38 | 19 | 7 | 12 | 53 | 38 | +15 | 64 | Qualification to Champions League group stage |
| 3 | Toulouse | 38 | 17 | 7 | 14 | 44 | 43 | +1 | 58 | Qualification to Champions League third qualifying round |
| 4 | Rennes | 38 | 14 | 15 | 9 | 38 | 30 | +8 | 57 | Qualification to UEFA Cup first round |
| 5 | Lens | 38 | 15 | 12 | 11 | 47 | 41 | +6 | 57 | Qualification to Intertoto Cup third round |
| 6 | Bordeaux | 38 | 16 | 9 | 13 | 39 | 35 | +4 | 57 | Qualification to UEFA Cup first round (Note: Bordeaux, the winner of the Coupe de la Ligue, is awarded entry to the 2007–08 UEFA Cup. The winners of the Coupe de France, Sochaux also have been awarded entry to the 2007–08 UEFA Cup.) |

Source: Ligue 1
Rules for classification: 1) points; 2) goal difference; 3) number of goals scored.

==== Results summary ====
| Overall | | | | | | | | Home | | | | | | Away | | | | | |
| Pld | W | D | L | GF | GA | GD | Pts | W | D | L | GF | GA | GD | W | D | L | GF | GA | GD |
|---|---|---|---|---|---|---|---|---|---|---|---|---|---|---|---|---|---|---|---|
| 38 | 14 | 15 | 9 | 38 | 30 | +8 | 57 | 10 | 6 | 3 | 24 | 15 | +9 | 4 | 9 | 6 | 14 | 15 | −1 |

Source: Ligue 1

==== Results by round ====
| Round | 1 | 2 | 3 | 4 | 5 | 6 | 7 | 8 | 9 | 10 | 11 | 12 | 13 | 14 | 15 | 16 | 17 | 18 | 19 | 20 | 21 | 22 | 23 | 24 | 25 | 26 | 27 | 28 | 29 | 30 | 31 | 32 | 33 | 34 | 35 | 36 | 37 | 38 |
|---|---|---|---|---|---|---|---|---|---|---|---|---|---|---|---|---|---|---|---|---|---|---|---|---|---|---|---|---|---|---|---|---|---|---|---|---|---|---|
| Ground | H | A | H | A | H | A | H | A | H | H | A | H | A | H | A | H | A | H | A | H | A | H | A | H | A | H | A | A | H | A | H | A | H | A | H | A | H | A |
| Result | L | L | D | L | W | D | D | L | W | W | L | W | D | D | L | W | W | D | D | L | W | W | D | D | W | L | L | D | W | D | W | D | W | W | D | D | W | D |
| Position | 15 | 20 | 20 | 19 | 16 | 16 | 16 | 19 | 15 | 14 | 15 | 13 | 13 | 12 | 12 | 10 | 10 | 11 | 9 | 12 | 11 | 10 | 10 | 10 | 8 | 9 | 9 | 11 | 11 | 8 | 9 | 11 | 6 | 6 | 5 | 6 | 5 | 4 |

Source: Ligue 1
A = Away; H = Home; W = Win; D = Draw; L = Loss

==== Matches ====
| 5 August 2006 1 | Rennes | 1–2 | Lille | Rennes |
| 17:15 CEST (UTC+2) | | Report | | Stadium: Stade de la Route de Lorient; Attendance: 22,497; Referee: Alain Hamer (Luxembourg) |

| 13 August 2006 2 | Marseille | 2–0 | Rennes | Marseille |
| 21:00 CEST (UTC+2) | | Report | | Stadium: Stade Vélodrome; Attendance: 55,711; Referee: Thierry Auriac |

| 19 August 2006 3 | Rennes | 1–1 | Monaco | Rennes |
| 20:00 CEST (UTC+2) | | Report | | Stadium: Stade de la Route de Lorient; Attendance: 25,877; Referee: Bruno Ruffray |

| 27 August 2006 4 | Valenciennes | 3–1 | Rennes | Valenciennes |
| 18:00 CEST (UTC+2) | | Report | | Stadium: Stade du Hainaut; Attendance: 14,061; Referee: Philippe Malige |

| 9 September 2006 5 | Rennes | 2–1 | Sochaux | Rennes |
| 20:00 CEST (UTC+2) | | Report | | Stadium: Stade de la Route de Lorient |

| 17 September 2006 6 | Nancy | 0–0 | Rennes | Nancy |
| 18:00 CEST (UTC+2) | | Report |

| 23 September 2006 7 | Rennes | 0–0 | Saint-Étienne | Rennes |
| 20:00 CEST (UTC+2) | | Report | | Stadium: Stade de la Route de Lorient |

| 30 September 2006 8 | Sedan | 1–0 | Rennes | Sedan |
| 20:00 CEST (UTC+2) | | Report |

| 14 October 2006 9 | Rennes | 3–1 | Auxerre | Rennes |
| 20:00 CEST (UTC+2) | | Report | | Stadium: Stade de la Route de Lorient |

| 21 October 2006 10 | Rennes | 1–0 | Nice | Rennes |
| 20:00 CEST (UTC+2) | | Report | | Stadium: Stade de la Route de Lorient |

| 28 October 2006 11 | Paris Saint-Germain | 1–0 | Rennes | Paris |
| 20:00 CEST (UTC+2) | | Report | | Stadium: Parc de Princes |

| 4 November 2006 12 | Rennes | 1–0 | Lyon | Rennes |
| 17:15 CET (UTC+1) | | Report | | Stadium: Stade de la Route de Lorient |

| 11 November 2006 13 | Lens | 0–0 | Rennes | Lens |
| 20:00 CET (UTC+1) | | Report | | Stadium: Stade Bollaert-Delelis |

| 18 November 2006 14 | Rennes | 1–1 | Le Mans | Rennes |
| 20:30 CET (UTC+1) | | Report | | Stadium: Stade de la Route de Lorient |

| 25 November 2006 15 | Toulouse | 1–0 | Rennes | Toulouse |
| 20:00 CET (UTC+1) | | Report | | Stadium: Stadium de Toulouse |

| 2 December 2006 16 | Rennes | 2–0 | Nantes | Rennes |
| 20:30 CET (UTC+1) | | Report | | Stadium: Stade de la Route de Lorient |

| 9 December 2006 17 | Bordeaux | 1–2 | Rennes | Bordeaux |
| 20:00 CET (UTC+1) | | Report | | Stadium: Stade Chaban-Delmas |

| 16 December 2006 18 | Rennes | 1–1 | Troyes | Rennes |
| 20:00 CET (UTC+1) | | Report | | Stadium: Stade de la Route de Lorient |

| 23 December 2006 19 | Lorient | 0–0 | Rennes | Lorient |
| 20:00 CET (UTC+1) | | Report |

| 14 January 2007 20 | Rennes | 0–2 | Marseille | Rennes |
| 21:00 CET (UTC+1) | | Report | | Stadium: Stade de la Route de Lorient |

| 24 January 2007 21 | Monaco | 0–2 | Rennes | Monaco |
| 20:30 CET (UTC+1) | | Report |

| 27 January 2007 22 | Rennes | 1–0 | Valenciennes | Rennes |
| 20:00 CET (UTC+1) | | Report | | Stadium: Stade de la Route de Lorient |

| 3 February 2007 23 | Sochaux | 0–0 | Rennes | Sochaux |
| 20:30 CET (UTC+1) | | Report | | Stadium: Stade Auguste Bonal |

| 10 February 2007 24 | Rennes | 1–1 | Nancy | Rennes |
| 20:00 CET (UTC+1) | | Report | | Stadium: Stade de la Route de Lorient |

| 17 February 2007 25 | Saint-Étienne | 1–3 | Rennes | Saint-Étienne |
| 17:10 CET (UTC+1) | | Report | | Stadium: Stade Geoffroy-Guichard |

| 24 February 2007 26 | Rennes | 0–2 | Sedan | Rennes |
| 20:00 CET (UTC+1) | | Report | | Stadium: Stade de la Route de Lorient |

| 3 March 2007 27 | Auxerre | 1–0 | Rennes | Auxerre |
| 20:00 CET (UTC+1) | | Report |

| 10 March 2007 28 | Nice | 1–1 | Rennes | Nice |
| 20:00 CET (UTC+1) | | Report |

| 18 March 2007 29 | Rennes | 1–0 | Paris Saint-Germain | Rennes |
| 21:00 CET (UTC+1) | | Report | | Stadium: Stade de la Route de Lorient |

| 7 April 2007 31 | Rennes | 1–0 | Lens | Rennes |
| 20:00 CEST (UTC+2) | | Report | | Stadium: Stade de la Route de Lorient |

| 14 April 2007 32 | Le Mans | 0–0 | Rennes | Le Mans |
| 20:00 CEST (UTC+2) | | Report | | Stadium: Stade Léon-Bollée |

| 18 April 2007 30 | Lyon | 0–0 | Rennes | Lyon |
| 19:00 CEST (UTC+2) | | Report | | Stadium: Stade de Gerland |

| 21 April 2007 33 | Rennes | 3–2 | Toulouse | Rennes |
| 20:00 CEST (UTC+2) | | Report | | Stadium: Stade de la Route de Lorient |

| 28 April 2007 34 | Nantes | 0–2 | Rennes | Nantes |
| 20:00 CEST (UTC+2) | | Report | | Stadium: Stade de la Beaujoire |

| 5 May 2007 35 | Rennes | 0–0 | Bordeaux | Rennes |
| 20:00 CEST (UTC+2) | | Report | | Stadium: Stade de la Route de Lorient |

| 9 May 2007 36 | Troyes | 2–2 | Rennes | Troyes |
| 20:30 CEST (UTC+2) | | Report | | Stadium: Stade de l'Aube |

| 19 May 2007 37 | Rennes | 4–1 | Lorient | Rennes |
| 20:45 CEST (UTC+2) | | Report | | Stadium: Stade de la Route de Lorient |

| 26 May 2007 38 | Lille | 1–1 | Rennes | Lille |
| 20:45 CEST (UTC+2) | | Report | | Stadium: Stadium Lille Métropole |

=== Coupe de France ===
| 6 January 2007 Round of 64 | Rennes | 1–3 | Romorantin | Rennes |
| 19:00 CET (UTC+1) | | | | Stadium: Stade de la Route de Lorient |

=== Coupe de la Ligue ===
| 20 September 2006 Third round | Rennes | 2–1 | Libourne | Rennes |
| 21:00 CET (UTC+1) | | | | Stadium: Stade de la Route de Lorient |

| 24 October 2006 Round of 16 | Lille | 0–2 | Rennes | Lille |
| 21:00 CET (UTC+1) | | | | Stadium: Stadium Lille Métropole |

| 20 December 2006 Quarter-finals | Rennes | 0–1 | Reims | Rennes |
| 18:00 CET (UTC+1) | | | Fauré 51' | Stadium: Stade de la Route de Lorient; Attendance: 18,329; Referee: Stéphane Lannoy |
