= 2007 Coupe de la Ligue final =

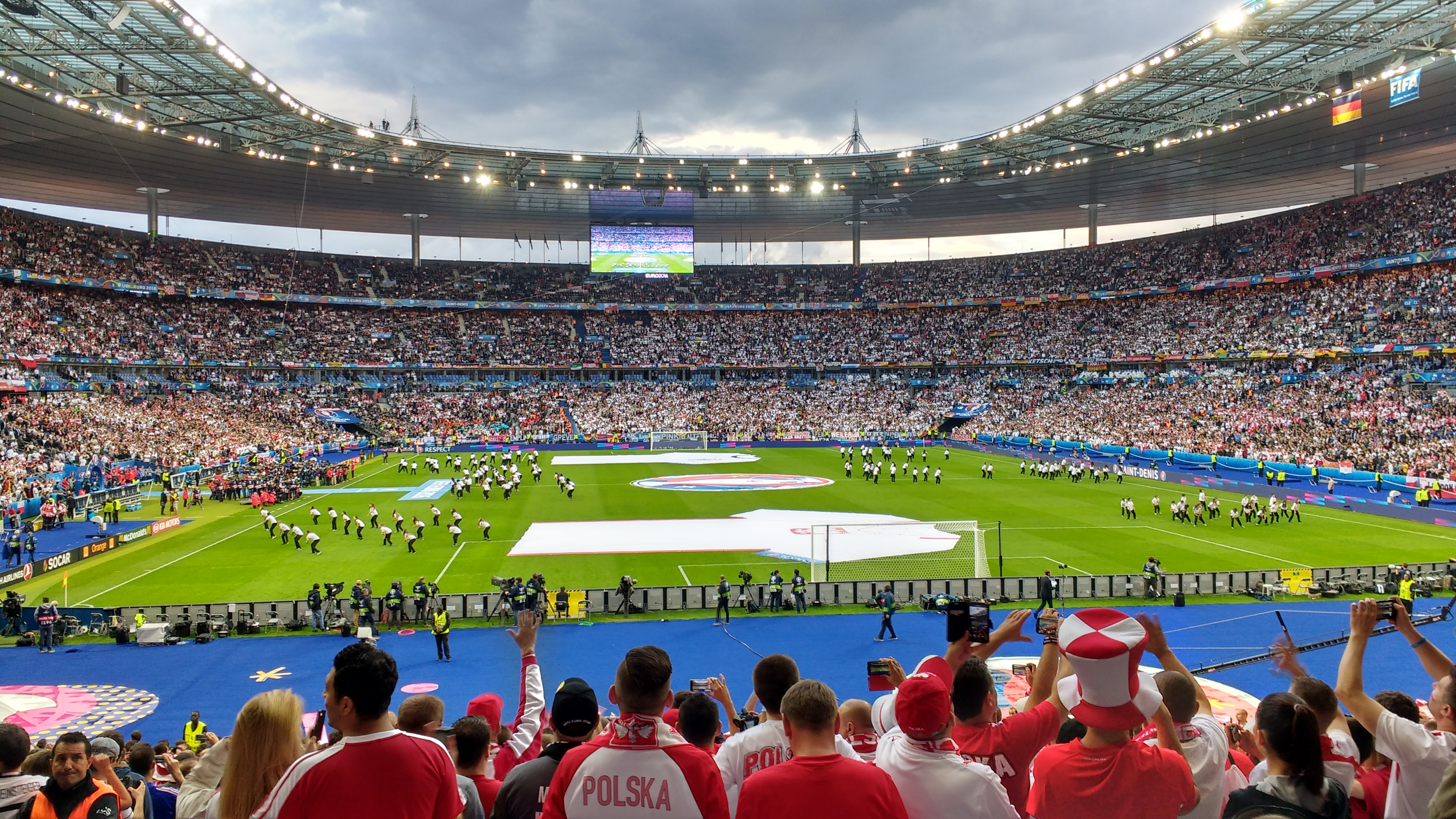
- Event: 2006–07 Coupe de la Ligue
| Lyon | Bordeaux |
| Ligue 1 | Ligue 1 |
| 0 | 1 |
- Date: 31 March 2007
- Venue: Stade de France, Saint-Denis
- Referee: Hervé Piccirillo
- Attendance: 79,072

The 2007 Coupe de la Ligue final was a football match held at Stade de France, Saint-Denis on 31 March 2007, that saw Bordeaux defeat Lyon 1–0 thanks to a goal by Henrique.

== Route to the final ==
Note: In all results below, the score of the finalist is given first (H: home; A: away).

| Lyon | | Round | Bordeaux | |
|---|---|---|---|---|
| Opponent | Result | 2006–07 Coupe de la Ligue | Opponent | Result |
| Paris Saint-Germain (H) | 2–1 | Round of 16 | Auxerre (A) | 1–0 |
| Nancy (H) | 3–1 | Quarter-finals | Saint-Étienne (A) | 1–0 (a.e.t.) |
| Le Mans (H) | 1–0 | Semi-finals | Reims (A) | 2–1 |

== Match details ==
31 March 2007
20:45

| Lyon | 0–1 | Bordeaux |
|---|---|---|
| | | Henrique 89' |

Stade de France, Saint-Denis
Attendance: 79,072
Referee: Hervé Piccirillo

OLYMPIQUE LYONNAIS:
| GK | 30 | (France) Rémy Vercoutre |
| DF | 2 | (France) François Clerc |
| DF | 3 | (Brazil) Cris |
| DF | 20 | (France) Eric Abidal |
| DF | 29 | (France) Sébastien Squillaci |
| MF | 8 | (Brazil) Juninho (c) | (substituted off) 68' |
| MF | 10 | (France) Florent Malouda |
| MF | 21 | (Portugal) Tiago Mendes | (substituted off) 91' |
| MF | 28 | (France) Jérémy Toulalan |
| FW | 11 | (Brazil) Fred |
| FW | 14 | (France) Sidney Govou |
Substitutes:
| MF | 6 | (Sweden) Kim Källström | (substituted on) 68' |
| FW | 22 | (France) Sylvain Wiltord | (substituted on) 91' |
Unused substitutes:
| GK | 1 | (France) Grégory Coupet |
| DF | 5 | (Brazil) Caçapa |
| DF | 12 | (France) Anthony Réveillère |
| FW | 7 | (Czech Republic) Milan Baroš |
| FW | 19 | (France) Karim Benzema |
Manager:
(France) Gérard Houllier Assistant Referees: Fourth Official:

FC GIRONDINS DE BORDEAUX:
| GK | 16 | (France) Ulrich Ramé (c) |
| DF | 3 | (Brazil) Carlos Henrique |
| DF | 6 | (France) Franck Jurietti |
| DF | 18 | (France) Julien Faubert |
| DF | 27 | (France) Marc Planus |
| MF | 5 | (Brazil) Fernando Menegazzo |
| MF | 14 | (France) Johan Micoud |
| MF | 17 | (Brazil) Wendel | (substituted off) 67' |
| MF | 24 | (France) Rio Mavuba |
| FW | 9 | (France) Jean-Claude Darcheville |
| FW | 29 | (Morocco) Marouane Chamakh | (substituted off) 46' |
Substitutes:
| DF | 23 | (France) Florian Marange | (substituted on) 46' |
| FW | 15 | (Brazil) Jussiê | (substituted on) 67' |
Unused substitutes:
| GK | 30 | (France) Mathieu Valverde |
| DF | 13 | (Tunisia) David Jemmali |
| MF | 8 | (Argentina) Alejandro Alonso |
| MF | 11 | (Czech Republic) Vladimír Šmicer |
| FW | 7 | (Argentina) Fernando Cavenaghi |
Manager:
(Brazil) Ricardo Gomes

== See also ==
- 2007 Coupe de France final
- 2006–07 FC Girondins de Bordeaux season
- 2006–07 Olympique Lyonnais season
