= Tiago Mendes =

Portuguese footballer (born 1981)

Tiago
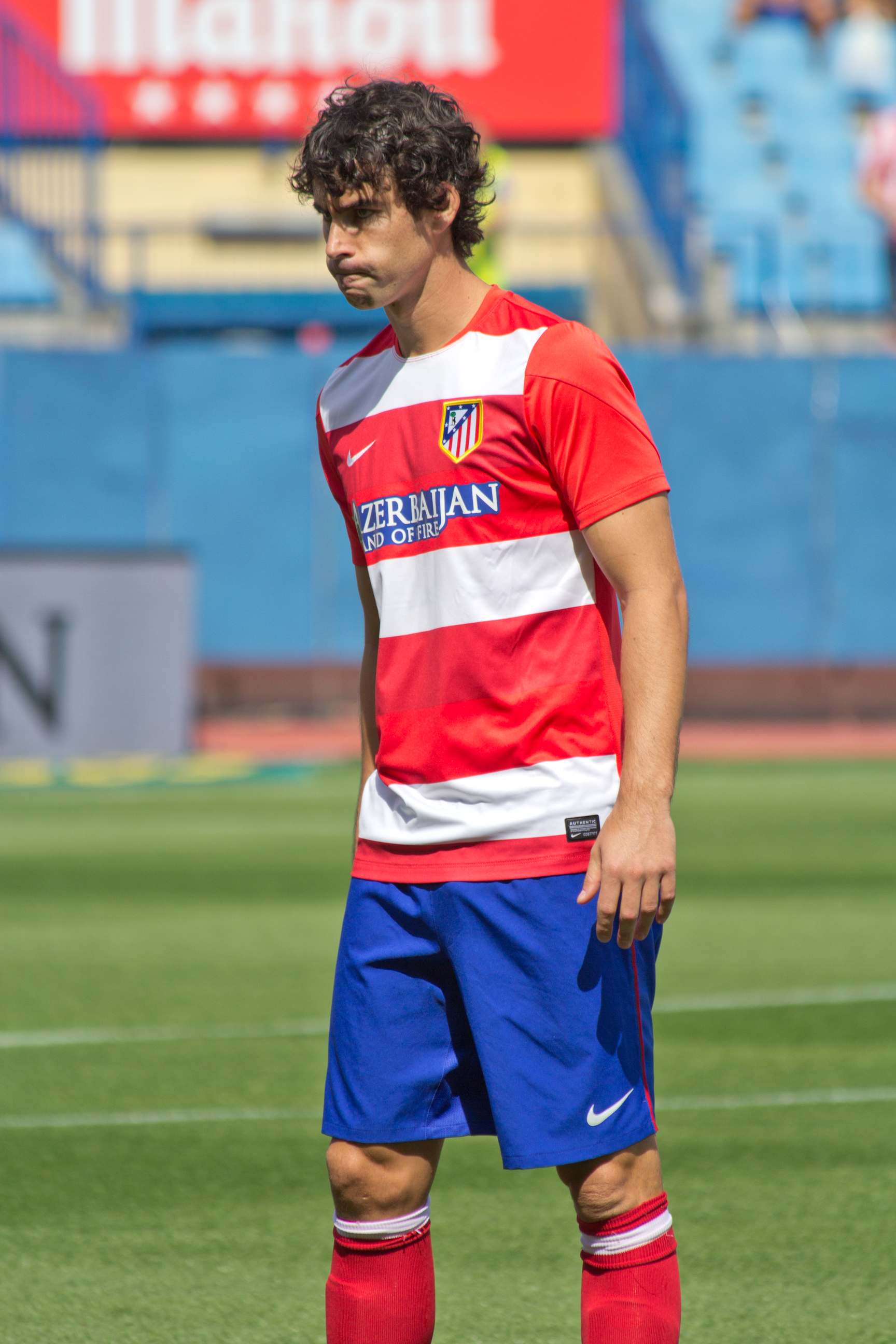
- Tiago as an Atlético Madrid player in 2013

Personal information
- Full name: Tiago Cardoso Mendes
- Date of birth: 2 May 1981 (age 45)
- Place of birth: Viana do Castelo, Portugal
- Height: 1.83 m (6 ft 0 in)
- Position: Midfielder

Youth career
- 1991–1995: Vianense
- 1996–1997: Âncora-Praia
- 1997–1999: Braga

Senior career*
Years	Team	Apps	(Gls)
1999–2001	Braga B	13	(0)
1999–2002	Braga	62	(3)
2002–2004	Benfica	75	(19)
2004–2005	Chelsea	34	(4)
2005–2007	Lyon	56	(9)
2007–2011	Juventus	42	(0)
2010–2011	→ Atlético Madrid (loan)	49	(6)
2011–2017	Atlético Madrid	126	(11)
Total		457	(52)

International career
2000–2002	Portugal U21	21	(3)
2002–2015	Portugal	66	(3)

Managerial career
- 2017–2018: Atlético Madrid (assistant)
- 2020: Vitória Guimarães
Medal record
Men's football
Representing Portugal
UEFA European Championship
Runner-up	2004 Portugal
- * Club domestic league appearances and goals

Tiago Cardoso Mendes OIH (Portuguese pronunciation: [tiˈaɣu kɐɾˈðozu ˈmẽdɨʃ]; born 2 May 1981), known simply as Tiago, is a Portuguese former professional footballer who played as a midfielder.

He played in five of Europe's major leagues, Portugal, England, France, Italy and Spain. He notably spent eight seasons with Atlético Madrid, winning five major titles including the 2013–14 La Liga and the 2012 Europa League.

A Portugal international on 66 occasions, Tiago represented the nation in two World Cups and Euro 2004. He later worked briefly as a manager.

== Club career ==
=== Portugal ===
Born in Viana do Castelo, Tiago first came to prominence at Braga (having started out at Vianense, he also played handball for one year as a youth), being cast into the Minho side's starting XI at the age of just 18 and helping with 27 games as they finished in fourth place in 2001, thus qualifying for the UEFA Cup.

In late December 2001, solid displays earned Tiago – and Braga teammates Armando Sá and Ricardo Rocha – a move to giants Benfica. In his first full season he scored a career-best 13 goals to help to a runner-up position in the Primeira Liga and, the following year, won the Taça de Portugal against Porto.

=== Chelsea ===
Tiago signed for Chelsea on 20 July 2004 for a €15 million fee, becoming José Mourinho's sixth signing that season (this included three other Portuguese players). Having missed the first Premier League game, he soon became an important member of his new team, scoring on his away debut against Crystal Palace on 24 August; he also scored a long-range goal in a 3–1 win over Manchester United on 10 May 2005, after already having won the title.

Tiago was a regular for Chelsea, having only missed four games in the league. He ended the season successfully as a firm fixture in the Blues' midfield three, making 51 appearances in all competitions and scoring four goals as the club also added the Football League Cup. However, despite his initial success, the following campaign saw the arrival of Michael Essien from Lyon, which limited his first-team chances; during his time at Stamford Bridge, his loss percentage in the league was 2.94%, just once in 34 appearances – 1–0 at Manchester City on 16 October 2004 – which was the lowest in history for any player having appeared at least 20 times.

=== Lyon ===
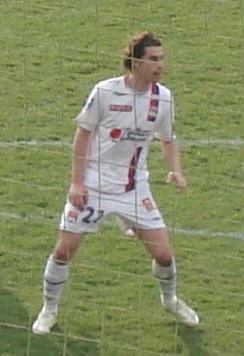
Tiago playing for Lyon in 2007

In late August 2005, Tiago signed for Lyon on a four-year contract, for a €10.1 million transfer fee. Usually playing in a defensive midfield role alongside Juninho Pernambucano, Mahamadou Diarra and Florent Malouda, he excelled for his team, scoring seven goals in 37 appearances. The highlights of his first season in France were a pair of goals against PSV Eindhoven that took them into the quarter-finals in the UEFA Champions League, and the winning goal against Troyes on 1 April 2006; the club finished top of Ligue 1, winning a fifth consecutive accolade.

After the departure of Diarra to Real Madrid the following campaign, Tiago began to play a more significant role in Lyon's midfield with his former teammate's replacement Jérémy Toulalan. He won his second league title and helped reach the final of the Coupe de la Ligue, lost to Bordeaux after a last-minute strike; overall, he netted six times in 38 matches.

=== Juventus ===
On 17 June 2007, Lyon president Jean-Michel Aulas confirmed that Tiago's departure from Lyon was imminent with both Juventus and AC Milan reportedly after his signature; he officially signed for the former five days later, for a €13 million fee. His performance in 2007–08 was criticised, however, with Goal.com describing him as the third biggest flop of the season.

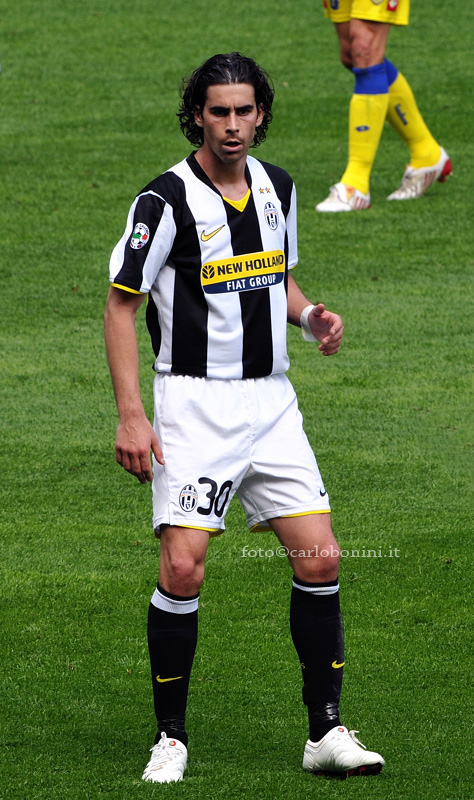
Tiago with Juventus in 2009

The start of the following campaign gave Tiago an opportunity to return to the Premier League in the form of year-long loan offer from Everton, with the Italians agreeing to the deal but with the player refusing to terms. The negotiations had a violent end when he forcibly locked Juventus president Giovanni Cobolli Gigli inside a toilet stall – the chairman was finally rescued by captain Alessandro Del Piero, more than an hour later. He eventually established himself in Claudio Ranieri's side but, in November 2008, against Inter Milan, he was stretchered off the pitch with a serious knee injury just several minutes into the match, and was sidelined for almost two months.

Tiago returned to the bench for the January match against Lazio, but found himself down the pecking order as Cristiano Zanetti, Mohamed Sissoko, and emerging youngster Claudio Marchisio were Ranieri's preferred centre midfield pairing. Following injuries to Sissoko and later Marchisio he was back in the starting XI, but his return was soured by a straight red card in the Derby d'Italia fixture in April (1–1 home draw).

The first half of 2009–10 was one to forget for Tiago. With the arrivals of midfielders Diego and Felipe Melo, coupled by his slight dip in form, his appearances were again limited; under Ciro Ferrara he was relegated to the bench once again, only making seven Serie A appearances.

=== Atlético Madrid ===
On 8 January 2010, Tiago joined Atlético Madrid on loan until the end of the season. He scored his first league goal in nearly three years on 21 January, heading home against Celta de Vigo in a 1–1 home draw in the quarter-finals of the Copa del Rey (2–1 aggregate win); gradually, he established himself in the starting lineup ahead of longtime incumbent Raúl García, also reuniting with former Benfica teammate Simão Sabrosa.

After helping the Colchoneros to the domestic cup final – he was cup-tied for the Europa League – a new loan deal was arranged with Juventus. Again, he played in significantly more minutes than García as Atlético finally qualified for the Europa League, and added four goals in La Liga, including a brace to help defeat Málaga 3–0 away, both goals coming from headers.

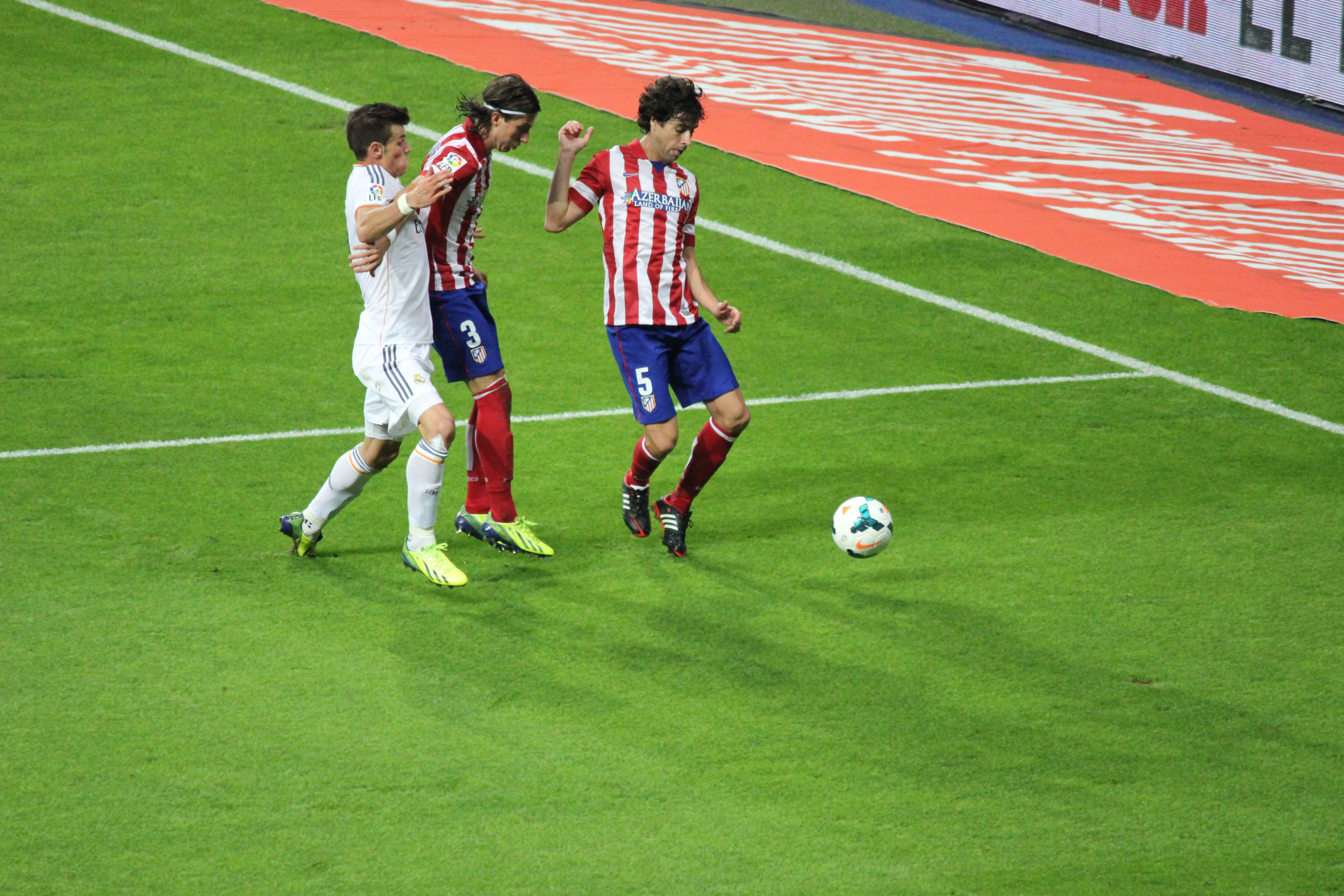
Tiago (right) in action against Real Madrid, in 2013

On 20 July 2011, Tiago signed a permanent two-year deal. He was again an important part of the team that reached the Europa League final, usually playing as a starter under coach Diego Simeone, who replaced Gregorio Manzano midway through the season; he missed the decisive match in Bucharest however, being sent off in the semi-final's second leg against Valencia (1–0 away victory, 5–2 on aggregate) after slapping Roberto Soldado.

On 21 July 2014, aged 33, Tiago renewed his contract with Atlético for two seasons. On 13 September he put the visiting team ahead at Real Madrid after heading home a corner kick from Koke, in an eventual 2–1 win. In the reverse fixture on 7 February 2015, he opened the scoring in a 4–0 rout; eighteen days later, he received his marching orders in the 1–0 away loss to Bayer Leverkusen in the first leg of the Champions League last-16.

On 28 November 2015, in the first half of the league fixture against Espanyol, Tiago suffered an undisplaced fracture to his right tibia, going on to be sidelined for several months. He left the Vicente Calderón Stadium at the end of the 2016–17 campaign, with competitive totals of 229 games and 19 goals both spells comprised.

== International career ==
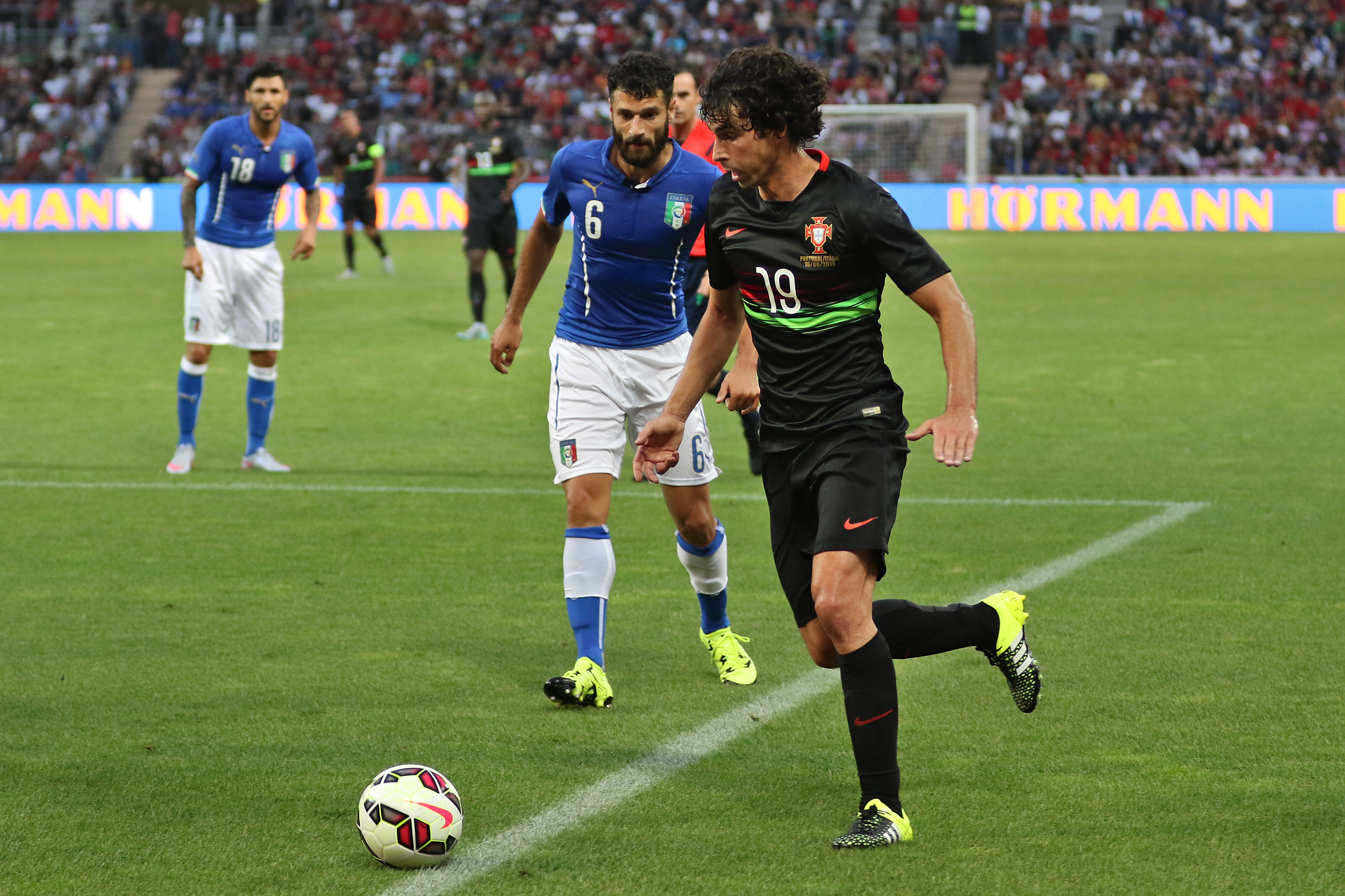
Tiago in a 2015 friendly against Italy

Tiago's performances in Portugal's youth teams eventually earned him his senior debut against Scotland in a November 2002 friendly. He went on to seal a regular berth in the squad and was included in the 23-man list for UEFA Euro 2004, although he did not play in the finals; originally part of the squad for that year's Summer Olympic Games, he withdrew through injury.

Moving to France proved crucial in international selection as Tiago's strong form at Lyon afforded him a place in Portugal's well-established midfield. His contributions aided the national team in their quest for qualification for the 2006 FIFA World Cup, and he appeared in five matches in the tournament held in Germany as Portugal reached the semi-finals, losing to France.

Tiago scored his first goal on 28 March 2007, in a Player of the match display away to Serbia (1–1). He was, however, overlooked, for Euro 2008's final squad.

Tiago was selected for the squad at the 2010 World Cup in South Africa, replacing Deco in the first game, a 0–0 against the Ivory Coast. He took the naturalised Brazilian's place for the following fixture, netting twice (including a header) in a 7–0 demolition of North Korea in Cape Town on 21 June.

After the World Cup, Tiago officially quit the national team citing personal reasons, and also to "make room for opportunities for younger players," ending his international career with 58 caps and three goals. On 3 October 2014, however, after an absence of almost four years, he was called up by new manager Fernando Santos for a friendly with France and the Euro 2016 qualifier against Denmark. He was sent off for two bookings on 13 June 2015, in a 3–2 win in Armenia in another qualifying match; he was not selected for the finals, not having fully recovered from a broken leg.

== Coaching career ==
Immediately after retiring, Tiago spent one year as assistant to former manager Simeone. He returned to the national team setup in June 2019, working with every age group from the under-15s to the under-20s.

Tiago had his first head coaching experience on 28 July 2020, signing a two-year contract with Vitória de Guimarães. He signed his former international teammate Ricardo Quaresma. On his managerial debut on 18 September, he lost by one goal at home to B-SAD.

Tiago resigned on 8 October 2020, having taken four points from three games.

== Style of play ==
A versatile defensive or central midfielder, with good vision and overall skills, Tiago was known mainly for his work-rate, tenacity and tackling ability, as well as his accurate distribution of the ball after winning back possession. These attributes earned him the nickname "the washing machine" during his time with Lyon.

== Career statistics ==
=== Club ===
Appearances and goals by club, season and competition
Club	Season	League			National cup (Note: Includes Taça de Portugal, FA Cup, Coupe de France, Coppa Italia, Copa del Rey)		League cup (Note: Includes Football League Cup, Coupe de la Ligue)		Continental		Other		Total	
Club	Season	Division	Apps	Goals	Apps	Goals	Apps	Goals	Apps	Goals	Apps	Goals	Apps	Goals
Braga	1999–2000	Primeira Liga	18	1	1	0	—		—		—		19	1
Braga	2000–01	Primeira Liga	27	0	1	0	—		—		—		28	0
Braga	2001–02	Primeira Liga	17	3	3	0	—		—		—		20	3
Braga	Total		62	4	5	0	—		—		—		67	4
Benfica	2001–02	Primeira Liga	15	1	3	0	—		—		—		18	1
Benfica	2002–03	Primeira Liga	31	13	0	0	—		—		—		31	13
Benfica	2003–04	Primeira Liga	29	5	5	3	—		9 (Note: Appearances in UEFA Champions League)	3	—		43	11
Benfica	Total		75	19	8	3	—		9	3	—		92	25
Chelsea	2004–05	Premier League	34	4	2	0	4	0	11	0	—		51	4
Chelsea	2005–06	Premier League	0	0	0	0	0	0	0	0	1 (Note: Appearances in FA Community Shield)	0	1	0
Chelsea	Total		34	4	2	0	4	0	11	0	1	0	52	4
Lyon	2005–06	Ligue 1	29	5	3	0	0	0	8	2	—		40	7
Lyon	2006–07	Ligue 1	27	4	0	0	3	0	8	2	—		38	6
Lyon	Total		56	9	3	0	3	0	16	4	—		78	13
Juventus	2007–08	Serie A	20	0	3	0	—		—		—		23	0
Juventus	2008–09	Serie A	15	0	0	0	—		3	0	—		18	0
Juventus	2009–10	Serie A	7	0	0	0	—		3	0	—		10	0
Juventus	Total		42	0	3	0	—		6	0	—		51	0
Atlético Madrid (loan)	2009–10	La Liga	18	2	5	1	—		—		—		23	3
Atlético Madrid (loan)	2010–11	La Liga	31	4	2	1	—		6 (Note: Appearances in UEFA Europa League)	1	—		39	6
Atlético Madrid	2011–12	La Liga	24	0	0	0	—		8	0	—		32	0
Atlético Madrid	2012–13	La Liga	22	2	3	0	—		5	0	—		30	2
Atlético Madrid	2013–14	La Liga	23	2	3	0	—		7	0	0	0	33	2
Atlético Madrid	2014–15	La Liga	31	5	1	0	—		4	0	1 (Note: Appearance in Supercopa de España)	0	37	5
Atlético Madrid	2015–16	La Liga	14	1	0	0	—		5	0	0	0	19	1
Atlético Madrid	2016–17	La Liga	12	1	0	0	—		3	0	0	0	15	1
Atlético Madrid	Total		175	17	14	2	—		38	1	1	0	228	20
Career total			445	52	35	5	7	0	80	8	1	0	567	64

=== International ===
Appearances and goals by national team and year
National team	Year	Apps	Goals
Portugal	2002	1	0
Portugal	2003	4	0
Portugal	2004	7	0
Portugal	2005	8	0
Portugal	2006	12	0
Portugal	2007	6	1
Portugal	2008	1	0
Portugal	2009	9	0
Portugal	2010	10	2
Portugal	2014	4	0
Portugal	2015	4	0
Total		66	3

Scores and results list Portugal's goal tally first, score column indicates score after each Tiago goal.

List of international goals scored by Tiago Mendes
No.	Date	Venue	Opponent	Score	Result	Competition
1	28 March 2007	Red Star Stadium, Belgrade, Serbia	Serbia	1–0	1–1	Euro 2008 qualifying
2	21 June 2010	Cape Town Stadium, Cape Town, South Africa	North Korea	4–0	7–0	2010 FIFA World Cup
3	21 June 2010	Cape Town Stadium, Cape Town, South Africa	North Korea	7–0	7–0	2010 FIFA World Cup

== Managerial statistics ==
As of match played 2 October 2020

Managerial record by team and tenure
Team	Nat	From	To	Record								Ref
Team	Nat	From	To	G	W	D	L	GF	GA	GD	Win %	Ref
Vitória Guimarães	(Portugal)	28 July 2020	8 October 2020	3	1	1	1	1	1	+0	33.33	
Total				3	1	1	1	1	1	+0	33.33	—

== Honours ==
Benfica

- Taça de Portugal: 2003–04

Chelsea

- Premier League: 2004–05
- Football League Cup: 2004–05
- FA Community Shield: 2005

Lyon

- Ligue 1: 2005–06, 2006–07
- Coupe de la Ligue runner-up: 2006–07

Atlético Madrid

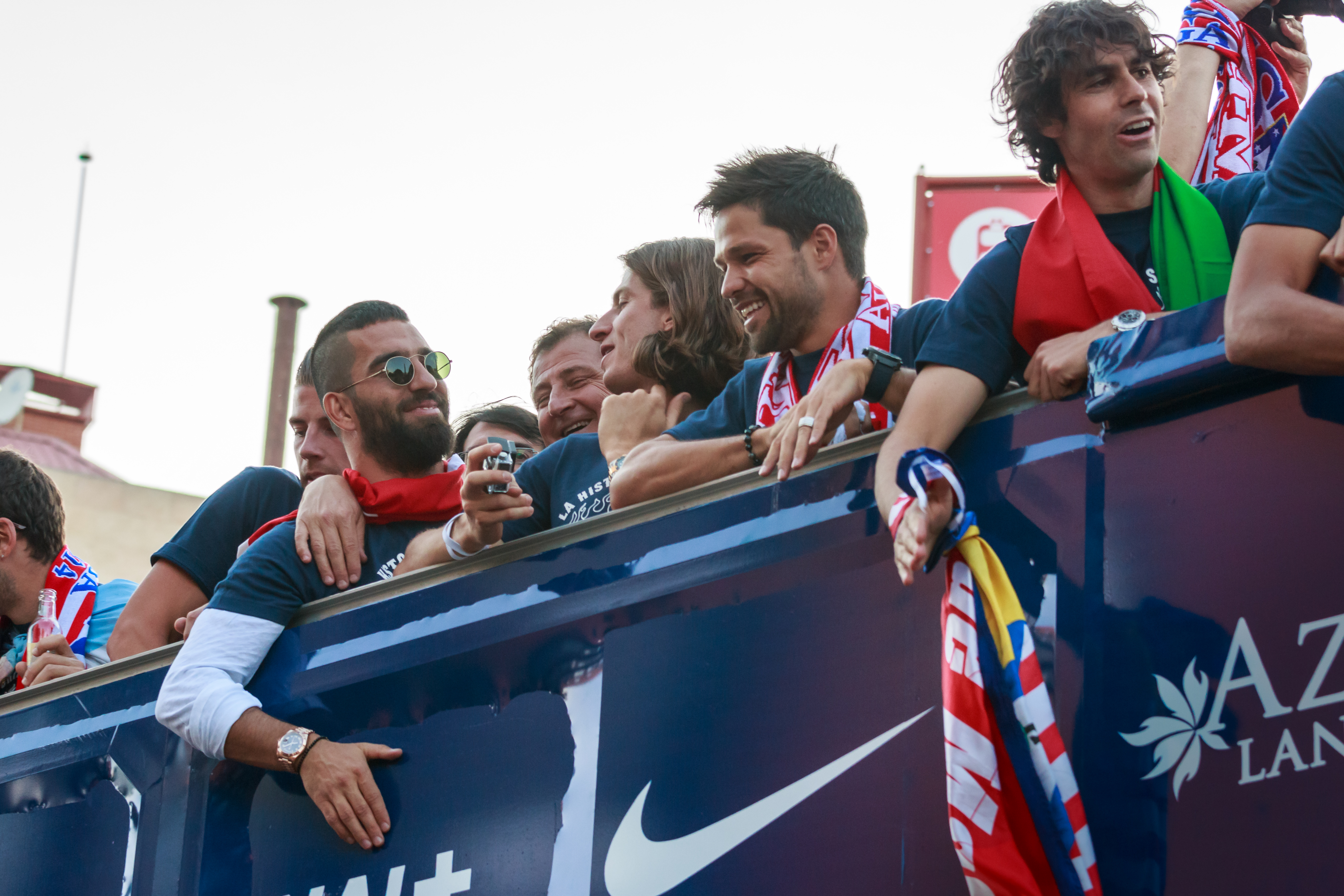
Tiago (furthest right) on Atlético's victory parade after winning the league in 2014

- La Liga: 2013–14
- Copa del Rey: 2012–13
- Supercopa de España: 2014
- UEFA Europa League: 2011–12
- UEFA Champions League runner-up: 2013–14, 2015–16

Portugal

- UEFA European Championship runner-up: 2004

Orders

- Medal of Merit, Order of the Immaculate Conception of Vila Viçosa (House of Braganza)
