= Steve Savidan =

French footballer (born 1978)

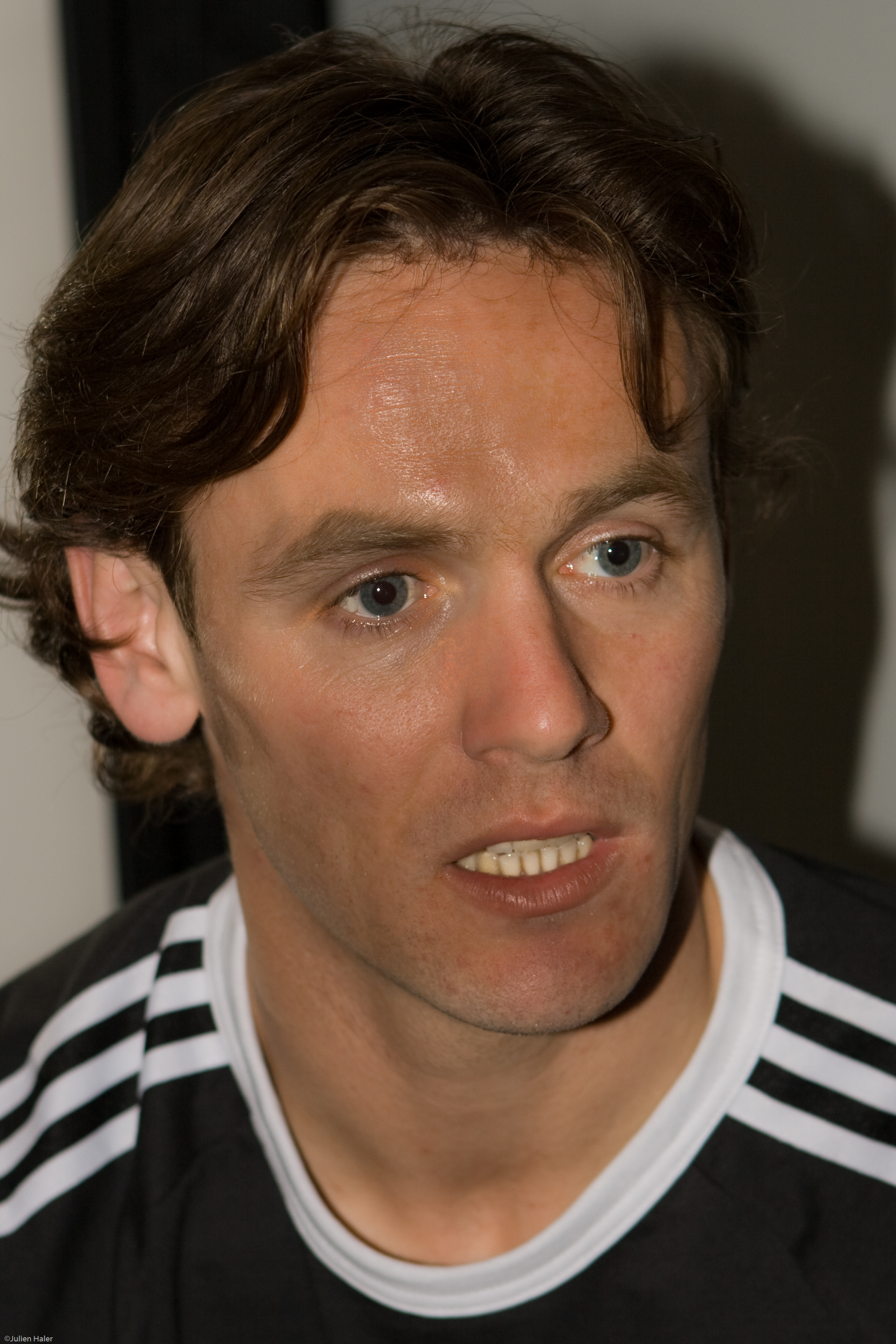
- Savidan in 2009

Personal information
- Full name: Steve André Dominique Savidan
- Date of birth: 29 June 1978 (age 48)
- Place of birth: Angers, Maine-et-Loire, France
- Height: 1.75 m (5 ft 9 in)
- Position: Striker

Senior career*
Years	Team	Apps	(Gls)
1997–1999	Angers	42	(15)
1999–2000	Châteauroux	20	(3)
2000–2001	Ajaccio	37	(6)
2001–2002	Angers	36	(6)
2002–2003	Beauvais	24	(0)
2003–2004	Angoulême	37	(12)
2004–2008	Valenciennes	145	(61)
2008–2009	Caen	38	(14)
2020	SO Cholet B	1	(0)
Total		379	(117)

International career
2008	France	1	(0)

Managerial career
- 2014–2017: SC Beaucouzé (assistant)
- 2017–2018: Stade Bordelais (U16)
- 2018–2019: Bassin d'Arcachon
- 2019–2020: SO Cholet B
- 2019–2020: SO Cholet (assistant)
- * Club domestic league appearances and goals

Steve André Dominique Savidan (born 29 June 1978) is a French retired footballer who played as a striker and current manager.

A late bloomer, he played for seven clubs, mostly in the country's second and third divisions. At the age of 30, he reached the France national team for his sole cap.

== Club career ==
Born in Angers, Maine-et-Loire, Savidan's first year of professional football was spent with Angers SCO, his hometown club. He attracted attention from LB Châteauroux, and was transferred to the Stade Gaston Petit after two seasons; he only managed to score three goals as a substitute and, at the end of the year, was sold to AC Ajaccio.

Savidan would spend also only one year at his new team, before returning to former side Angers. For 2002–03 he was bought by AS Beauvais, and failed to net once over the entire campaign, moving to AS Angoulême subsequently. As the latter operated in the Championnat National, thus lacking professional status, the player would also work briefly as a waste collector and bartender and dresseur de tigre; he finished that season with his best individual effort at the time, 12 goals.

At age 26, Savidan signed with Valenciennes FC also in the third division. Mainly due to his impressive scoring rate, the side went straight into Ligue 1 in just two seasons; during the second, they were crowned league winners and he finished joint-top scorer at 16.

In his first match in the top level, at AJ Auxerre on 5 August 2006 (aged 28), Savidan netted in a 1–1 draw. On 10 February of the following year he had an impressive performance, scoring four goals in a 5–2 away win against FC Nantes– he would finish the season as the competition's second top scorer, behind Pauleta.

Settled in Valenciennes, Savidan opened a restaurant called K9 (K for wife Karine, and 9 for his shirt number). However, he signed for Stade Malherbe Caen in summer 2008 for a reported fee of €5 million.

Savidan scored 14 times in 2008–09, but Caen were relegated to division two. Subsequently, he arranged a move to AS Monaco FC, also in the €5 million region; however, a defect in his heart was detected upon his medical, and the 31-year-old ended his career on 4 July 2009 at the advice of the club's doctors.

== International career ==
Savidan did not receive any call-ups to represent France during his two-year stint in the top level at Valenciennes, where he displayed good form. However, on 13 November 2008, aged 30, he was picked to the national team by coach Raymond Domenech, who was impressed by the player's start to the 2008–09 season. He played the second half of the 0–0 home draw against Uruguay, on the 19th.

== Post-retirement career ==
In the fall of 2009, Savidan – who played ice hockey in his childhood – joined ASG Angers, serving as coach of the under-9 team.

On 14 January 2010, he published his biography: Une Balle en plein cœur (English: A Ball in the Heart), written with David Berger. He also joined Canal+ and became a television consultant for Ligue 1 matches on Foot + and on the program Les Spécialistes in August 2010. Steve Savidan then joined the consultant team of Eurosport football department in September 2011. Savidan was on every Monday evening live for the big Ligue 2 games. Savidan was also the commentator of the final of FIFA 13 in Barcelona.

In June 2014, Steve Savidan joined SC Beaucouzé, a club located on the outskirts of Angers, as an assistant manager under his former Angers SCO teammate Lionel Duarte. Savidan also kickstarted the process of getting his coaching license. Savidan also opened a nightclub in Angers called K9, K for his wife Karine's first name and 9 for his favorite number. Perhaps, it was the same name as the restaurant he opened in 2007. In September 2015, he officiated in program called Luis attaque on RMC radio. He left this position after the UEFA Euro 2016.

In June 2017, Savidan was hired as manager for Stade Bordelais' U16 team. Savidan announced on 16 May 2018 that he had become the head of the FC Bassin d'Arcachon, which played in the Regional 1 (6th division). After a bad period, Savidan was fired in early November 2019.

On 27 December 2019, Savidan was appointed assistant manager of SO Cholet under manager Stéphane Rossi, and Savidan would also take charge of the club's reserve team. Savidan also brought himself on the pitch for a game at the end of January 2020, playing his first game since retiring in 2009. However, he was removed from his duties on 11 February 2020.

== Honours ==
Valenciennes

- Ligue 2: 2005–06

Individual

- Championnat National top scorer: 2004–05
- Ligue 2 top scorer: 2005–06
