= Clairefontaine paper mills =

French stationery company

Clairefontaine
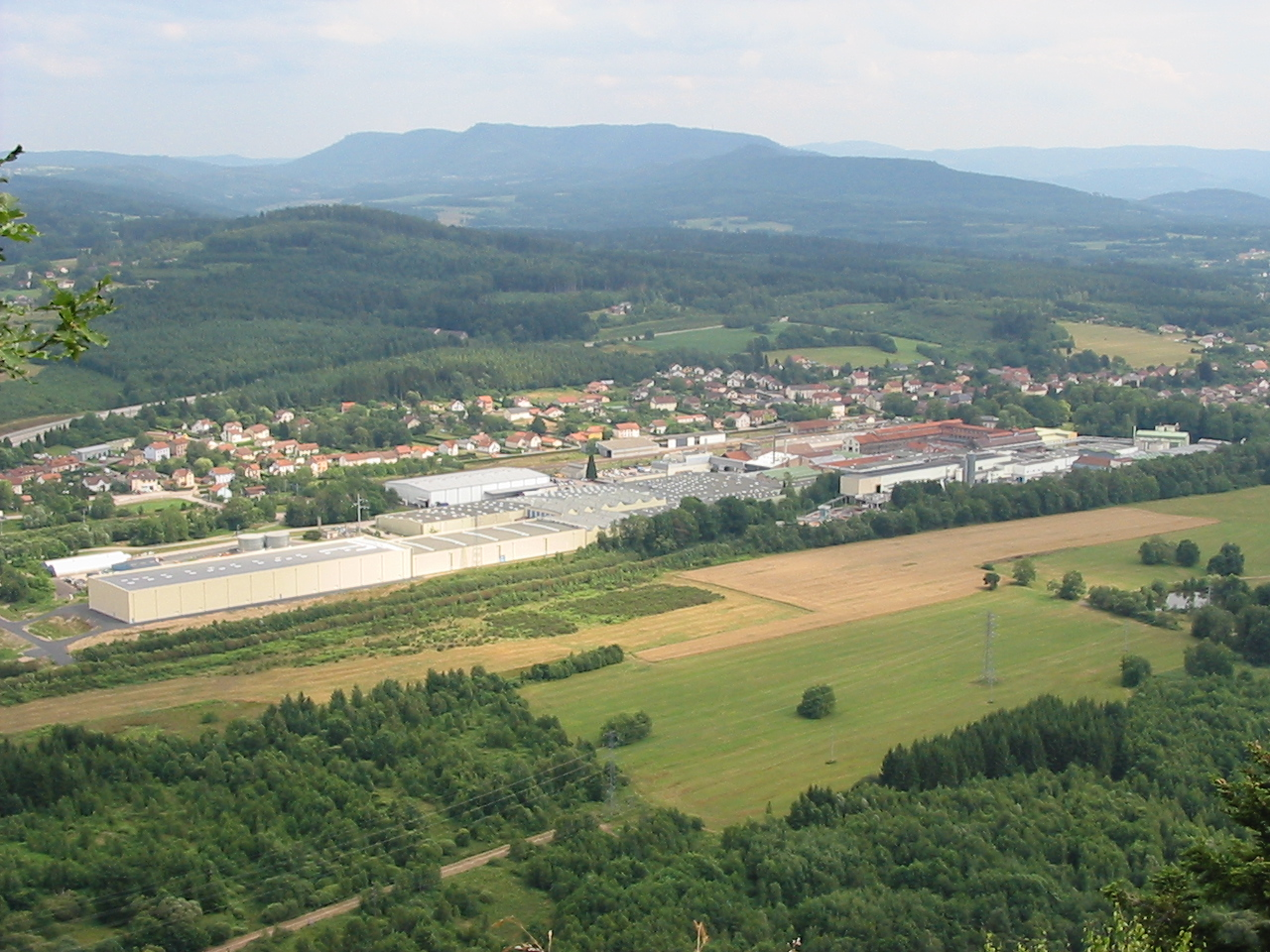
- The Clairefontaine paper mill in Étival
- Industry: Manufacturing; Product design; Papermaking
- Founded: 1858; 168 years ago
- Headquarters: Étival-Clairefontaine, France
- Area served: Worldwide
- Key people: Frédéric Nusse, Guillaume Nusse
- Products: Notebooks; Paper; Handicraft; Art Materials
- Owner: Exacompta Clairefontaine
- Number of employees: 545 (2018)
- Website: http://www.clairefontaine.com

Clairefontaine is a French stationery company founded in 1858 in the town of Étival-Clairefontaine, part of the Exacompta Clairefontaine group. Clairefontaine is renowned primarily for their notebooks, paper, and stationery products using acid-free paper manufactured directly by the company in Europe; however, it is also involved in the manufacture of fine art, handicraft and luggage products. The company actively participates in the development of French forests, by managing several hundred hectares of fir and spruce trees in the Vosges mountain range. The paper mill itself is still in use.

== History ==
In 1512, in the heart of the Vosges, the superior of the Abbey of Étival, François Faignozel of the Premonstratensians order, authorized the creation of a paper mill along the Valdange river. Because of the hard times, this mill would often change owners, but it always produced paper "to form" until the middle of the 19th century.

Taken over by Jean-Baptiste Bichelberger, a native of the Moselle (department) and trained in new continuous paper production processes, it allowed him to set up a little further on the banks of the Meurthe a modern factory, the "Papeteries de Clairefontaine", named after the company founded in 1858. These paper mills had plenty of water and the rags needed for their manufacture. In a France in the midst of the industrial revolution, all the conditions were met to ensure the growth of the factory. Jean-Baptiste Bichelberger held the reins until his death in 1877.

His son Paul Bichelberger and his son-in-law Émile Champon then made an important change by introducing wood as a raw material. The pulp was either made on site or purchased. The two men also launched the manufacture of envelopes and notebooks, until then mainly produced by printers.

From 1904 to 1914, the company was run by Louis Nusse, Jean-Baptiste Bichelberger's son-in-law, and Étienne Bodet. The Papeteries de Clairefontaine had grown significantly, with a workforce of around 1,100 people. But in 1914, the Great War broke out and the front line was so close to the factory that it heavily stifled production for five years. It restarted in 1919 under the direction of Léon Daridan, another son-in-law of Jean-Baptiste Bichelberger.

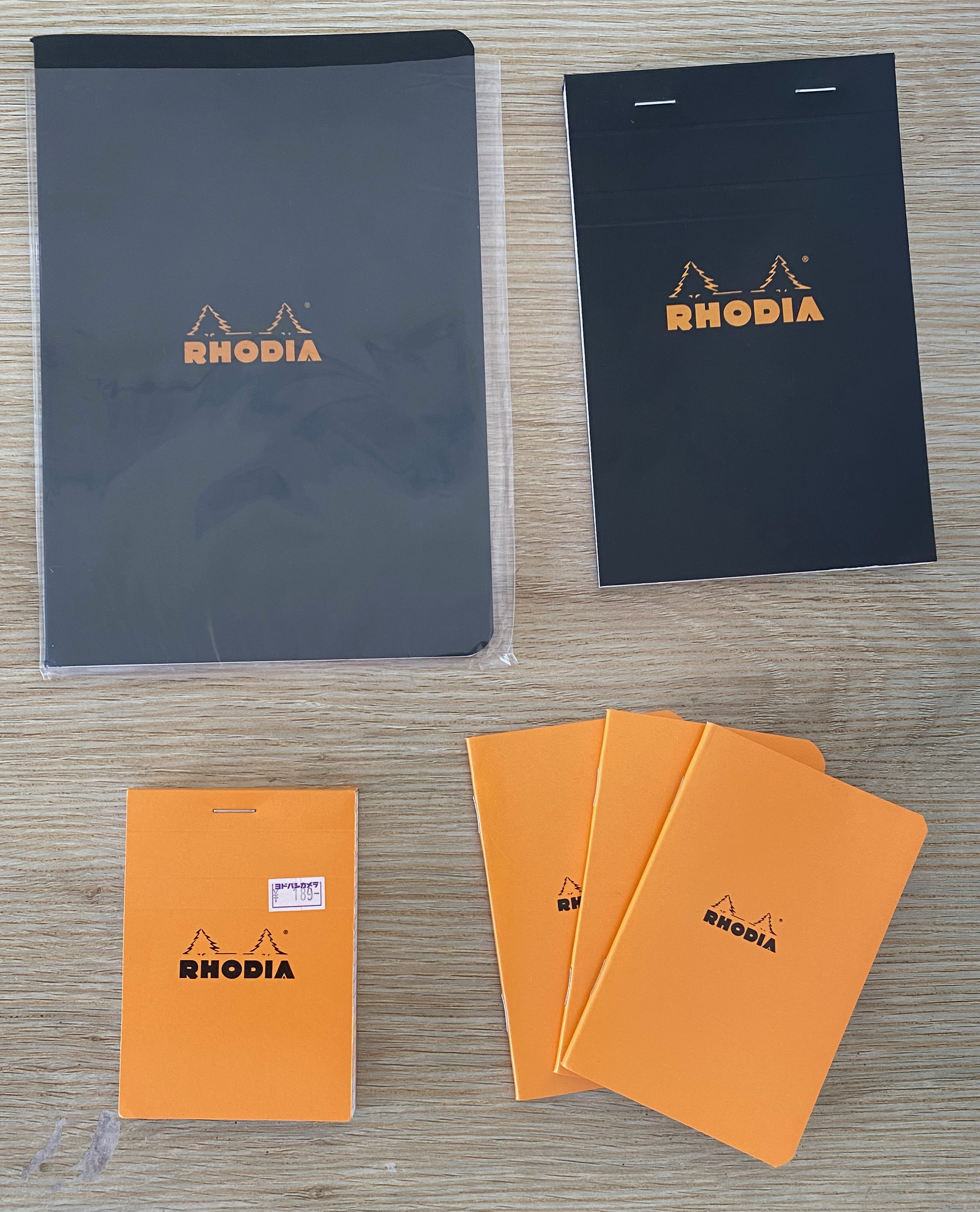
A selection of Rhodia branded notebooks

In 1928, Charles Nusse, son of Louis Nusse, created a workshop in Paris to manufacture accounting records, then another diary, under the brand Exacompta. To save the Papeteries de Clairefontaine, the buildings of which were largely destroyed during the Liberation, Charles Nusse took responsibility in 1950. It was with him that the Clairefontaine brand began to gain popularity. In 1951, he launched the famous Clairefontaine notebook, inimitable with its varnished cover and purple ruling. He also made the decision to promote the brand with the triangular Clairefontaine logo on each notebook cover, synonymous with quality for both schoolchildren and professionals. Under his leadership, while he managed the company until 1971, the Papeteries de Clairefontaine experienced considerable development. After an in-depth reorganisation, he equipped the plant with two paper machines to produce large quantities of quality papers, and modernised the converting workshops.

His son Jean-Marie continued his actions and led Clairefontaine to a position of European leader in high-end papers intended for office automation.

In 1996, the Euronext listed company became Exacompta Clairefontaine, and Clairefontaine's activities were split into two of the four departments of this group, which brings together around fifty companies, and employs more than 3,300 people:

- Papeteries de Clairefontaine and its subsidiaries (Mandeure, Everbal, Schut) manufacture more than 230,000 tonnes of paper for office automation, writing, offset and filing. Frédéric Nusse, nephew of Jean-Marie, took the lead in 2009.
- Clairefontaine-Rhodia with its subsidiaries (CFR, Décopatch, Makane Bouskoura) and holdings (Sill). Since 1998, Guillaume Nusse, son of Jean-Marie, has headed this department. The ranges offered are diversifying: new collections and covers, leatherette stationery, coloured envelopes, creative papers, etc.

In 1997, Clairefontaine acquired premium stationery brand Rhodia, to create the group Clairefontaine-Rhodia.

Since 2010, Clairefontaine also modernised their 30,000m^{2} warehouse in Alsace, which is able to deliver 8,500 items worldwide and has a 30,000 pallet capacity.

In 2019, Clairefontaine acquired American fine art brand Stillman & Birn.

== Production ==
Three product types are continuously manufactured on site: paper, envelopes and notebooks. The factory has two paper machines 3.4m wide; one of them provides a production speed of 1000m per minute, what represents 60 km and 15 tons of paper produced per hour. Clairefontaine provides over 165,000 tons of paper per year. Products are exported and distributed by the ExaClair subsidiary in other European countries as well as the USA.
