= 2006–07 Ligue 1 =

69th season of top-tier French football

Ligue 1
- Season: 2006–07
- Dates: 4 August 2006 – 26 May 2007
- Champions: Lyon (6th Title)
- Relegated: Troyes; Sedan; Nantes
- Champions League: Lyon; Marseille; Toulouse
- UEFA Cup: Rennes; Bordeaux; Sochaux
- Matches: 380
- Goals: 855 (2.25 per match)
- Top goalscorer: Pauleta (15 goals)

The 2006–07 Ligue 1 season was the 69th since its establishment, and started in August 2006 and ended in May 2007. Lyon became French champions, having won their sixth consecutive title.

== Teams ==
Location of teams in 2006–07 Ligue 1

Lyon were the reigning champions of France for the sixth time running. Following a defeat for their nearest challengers, Lyon won the league with six games to play, on 21 April, becoming the first team in the so-called "Big Five" European leagues to win six consecutive championships.

- Auxerre
- Bordeaux
- Le Mans
- Lens
- Lille
- Lorient
- Lyon
- Marseille
- Monaco
- Nancy
- Nantes
- Nice
- Paris Saint-Germain
- Rennes
- Saint-Étienne
- Sedan
- Sochaux
- Toulouse
- Troyes
- Valenciennes

=== Personnel and kits ===
Team	Manager	Kit manufacturer	Shirt sponsors (front)	Shirt sponsors (back)	Shirt sponsors (sleeve)	Shorts sponsors
Auxerre	(France) Jean Fernandez	Uhlsport	PlayStation	None	None	None
Bordeaux	(Brazil) Ricardo Gomes	Puma	Kia	Cdiscount	EUROP-LOT	Cdiscount
Le Mans	(France) Frédéric Hantz	Kappa	Le Gaulois (H)/Fermiers de Loué (A), Groupama, NTN	NTN	Système U	Passenaud Recyclage
Lens	(France) Francis Gillot	Nike	LG Mobile, Orange	Onzéo	None	CAFPI
Lille	(France) Claude Puel	Airness	Partouche Casino	Partouche Casino	None	None
Lorient	(France) Christian Gourcuff	Erreà	La Trinitaine, Cap l'Orient Agglomération	Modicom	DCNS	Bret's Chips
Lyon	(France) Gérard Houllier	Umbro	Novotel (H)/Ticket Restaurant (A), Apicil	Ticket Restaurant (H)/Novotel (A)	Renault Trucks	Renault Trucks
Marseille	(France) Albert Emon	Adidas	Neuf (H & A)/Internity (T)	Groupama	Internity	Quick
Monaco	(France) Laurent Banide	Puma	Bwin.com/Fight Aids Monaco/Fedcom, HSBC	HSBC	HSBC	NGS Technology
Nancy	(Uruguay) Pablo Correa	Baliston	Odalys Vacances/Vittel (in UEFA matches), Geodis Calberson, Vittel, Grand Nancy	Clairefontaine	Regina	TUI
Nantes	(Armenia) Michel Der Zakarian	Airness	Synergie Interim	Synergie Interim	Dirickx	None
Nice	(France) Frédéric Antonetti	Puma	Rica Lewis (H)/Gorenje (A), Takara Multimédia	Gorenje (H)/Rica Lewis (A)	Pizzorno Environnement	Pizzorno Environnement
Paris Saint-Germain	(France) Paul Le Guen	Nike	Fly Emirates	Alain Afflelou	PSG TV	None
Rennes	(France) Pierre Dréossi	Airness	Samsic Propreté, TAT Express, rennes.fr	Fiat Utilitaires	Association ELA	Groupe ROSE
Saint-Étienne	(Czech Republic) Ivan Hašek	Adidas	Konica Minolta, Conseil général de la Loire en Rhône-Alpes	Onzéo/Groupama	Bwin.com	Fruité Entreprises
Sedan	(France) José Pasqualetti	Hummel	Invicta Group, Caisse d'Épargne	Triangle Interim	None	Cora
Sochaux	(France) Alain Perrin	Lotto	Esso Ultron, Franche-Comté	Loxam	Fidest France	None
Toulouse	(France) Elie Baup	Lotto	888.com/Groupe IDEC, Monné-Decroix, ISS	888.com/Newrest	Creditec	Eaux d'Alet
Troyes	(France) Jean-Marc Furlan	Baliston	Baguépi (H)/Groupe Nasuba (A), Samro	Groupe Nasuba (H)/Baguépi (A)	None	LCR
Valenciennes	(France) Antoine Kombouaré	Airness	Toyota (H)/SITA (A)	SITA (H)/Toyota (A)	None	None

== League table ==
Pos	Team	Pld	W	D	L	GF	GA	GD	Pts	Qualification or relegation
1	Lyon (C)	38	24	9	5	64	27	+37	81	Qualification to Champions League group stage
2	Marseille	38	19	7	12	53	38	+15	64	Qualification to Champions League group stage
3	Toulouse	38	17	7	14	44	43	+1	58	Qualification to Champions League third qualifying round
4	Rennes	38	14	15	9	38	30	+8	57	Qualification to UEFA Cup first round
5	Lens	38	15	12	11	47	41	+6	57	Qualification to Intertoto Cup third round
6	Bordeaux	38	16	9	13	39	35	+4	57	Qualification to UEFA Cup first round (Note: Bordeaux, the winner of the Coupe de la Ligue, is awarded entry to the 2007–08 UEFA Cup. The winners of the Coupe de France, Sochaux also have been awarded entry to the 2007–08 UEFA Cup.)
7	Sochaux	38	15	12	11	46	48	−2	57	Qualification to UEFA Cup first round
8	Auxerre	38	13	15	10	41	41	0	54	
9	Monaco	38	13	12	13	45	38	+7	51	
10	Lille	38	13	11	14	45	43	+2	50	
11	Saint-Étienne	38	14	7	17	52	50	+2	49	
12	Le Mans	38	11	16	11	45	46	−1	49	
13	Nancy	38	13	10	15	37	44	−7	49	
14	Lorient	38	12	13	13	33	40	−7	49	
15	Paris Saint-Germain	38	12	12	14	42	42	0	48	
16	Nice	38	9	16	13	34	40	−6	43	
17	Valenciennes	38	11	10	17	36	48	−12	43	
18	Troyes (R)	38	9	12	17	39	54	−15	39	Relegation to Ligue 2
19	Sedan (R)	38	7	14	17	46	58	−12	35	Relegation to Ligue 2
20	Nantes (R)	38	7	13	18	29	49	−20	34	Relegation to Ligue 2

Source: Ligue 1
Rules for classification: 1) points; 2) goal difference; 3) number of goals scored.
(C) Champions; (R) Relegated

== Results ==
Home \ Away	AUX	BOR	MFC	RCL	LIL	LOR	OL	OM	ASM	NAL	NAN	NIC	PSG	REN	STE	SED	SOC	TFC	TRO	VAL
Auxerre		0–0	2–3	1–0	2–1	2–1	0–0	0–3	2–1	2–0	1–0	0–0	0–0	1–0	1–1	2–2	1–0	1–0	1–0	1–1
Bordeaux	0–0		1–0	1–0	0–1	1–1	1–2	1–0	1–0	3–0	0–1	3–2	0–0	1–2	1–0	3–1	2–0	2–0	2–1	2–1
Le Mans	2–2	1–1		1–1	1–1	1–1	0–1	2–0	0–2	0–0	1–1	1–0	1–1	0–0	2–1	3–2	2–2	2–0	2–0	3–2
Lens	1–0	3–0	2–0		1–1	1–1	0–4	1–1	1–0	2–2	2–0	0–0	1–2	0–0	3–3	1–1	3–1	2–0	1–0	3–0
Lille	1–1	3–0	0–2	4–0		1–0	1–2	1–0	1–1	0–1	0–0	1–0	1–0	1–1	2–2	2–1	2–0	1–3	4–0	0–2
Lorient	2–1	0–1	2–1	1–0	0–0		1–3	2–1	0–0	2–0	3–1	0–0	0–1	0–0	0–0	2–0	1–3	0–1	0–0	1–0
Lyon	1–0	1–2	2–1	3–0	4–1	1–0		1–1	0–0	1–0	3–1	1–1	3–1	0–0	2–1	1–0	3–3	1–1	2–0	2–1
Marseille	3–1	2–1	2–0	0–1	4–0	0–1	1–4		2–1	2–1	0–0	3–0	1–1	2–0	2–1	1–0	4–2	3–0	2–1	1–0
Monaco	2–1	0–0	2–1	0–0	3–1	2–2	2–0	1–2		2–1	2–1	0–0	1–2	0–2	1–2	2–1	3–0	1–3	0–0	3–0
Nancy	1–0	2–1	1–1	2–1	1–3	0–1	0–3	2–0	1–0		1–0	3–0	0–3	0–0	0–2	3–1	5–2	2–1	1–0	1–0
Nantes	1–1	0–0	0–0	0–0	1–1	0–2	1–3	2–1	1–0	2–1		1–0	1–1	0–2	2–2	0–1	0–2	0–0 (Note: French League proclaimed Toulouse to be winners of the match after invasion of the playground by supporters of Nantes)	1–1	2–5
Nice	0–0	2–1	3–3	1–2	2–1	3–0	1–4	2–1	1–1	0–0	1–1		1–0	1–1	2–1	2–2	0–0	0–1	3–0	2–0
Paris SG	0–1	0–2	2–1	1–3	1–0	2–3	1–1	1–3	4–2	0–0	4–0	0–0		1–0	0–2	4–2	0–0	0–0	2–1	1–2
Rennes	3–1	0–0	1–1	0–0	1–2	4–1	1–0	0–2	1–1	1–1	2–0	1–0	1–0		0–0	0–2	2–1	3–2	1–1	1–0
Saint-Étienne	2–3	0–2	2–0	3–2	2–1	2–0	1–3	1–2	0–1	1–0	2–1	2–1	1–0	1–3		1–2	1–2	3–0	3–1	3–0
Sedan	2–2	1–1	1–2	2–2	2–0	3–1	0–1	0–0	0–1	2–2	1–1	1–1	1–0	1–0	2–2		1–1	0–2	1–2	1–1
Sochaux	1–1	2–1	2–0	0–3	0–0	1–1	0–1	1–0	2–1	2–1	1–2	1–1	3–2	0–0	1–0	1–1		4–2	1–0	1–0
Toulouse	2–0	3–1	0–1	0–1	1–0	0–0	2–0	3–0	1–1	2–2	0–4	1–0	1–3	1–0	1–0	3–1	1–2		1–1	3–0
Troyes	3–3	1–0	2–2	3–0	1–1	3–0	1–0	1–1	0–4	0–0	1–0	2–0	1–1	2–2	3–1	3–2	0–1	1–2		1–3
Valenciennes	1–3	2–0	1–1	1–3	0–3	0–0	0–0	0–0	2–2	1–0	1–0	0–1	0–0	3–1	1–0	2–1	0–0	0–0	3–1	

Source: Ligue 1
Legend: Blue = home team win; Yellow = draw; Red = away team win.

== Top goalscorers ==
Rank	Player	Club	Goals
1	(Portugal) Pauleta	Paris Saint-Germain	15
2	(France) Steve Savidan	Valenciennes	13
3	(Guinea) Ismaël Bangoura	Le Mans	12
3	(Senegal) Mamadou Niang	Marseille	12
3	(Brazil) Grafite	Le Mans	12
6	(Nigeria) John Utaka	Rennes	11
6	(Ivory Coast) Aruna Dindane	Lens	11
6	(Brazil) Fred	Lyon	11
6	(Mali) Seydou Keita	Lens	11
6	(France) Frédéric Piquionne	Monaco	11
6	(Sweden) Johan Elmander	Toulouse	11

== Awards ==
=== Player of the Month ===
Month	Player
August	(France) Steve Savidan (Valenciennes)
September	(France) Jérémie Janot (Saint-Étienne)
October	(Brazil) Juninho (Lyon)
November	(France) Florent Malouda (Lyon)
December	(France) Frédéric Piquionne (Saint-Étienne)
January	(Senegal) Bafétimbi Gomis (Saint-Étienne)
February	(Sweden) Johan Elmander (Toulouse)
March	(France) Samir Nasri (Marseille)
April	(France) Péguy Luyindula (Paris Saint-Germain)

=== Annual ===
Award	Winner	Club	Ref.
Player of the Season	(France) Florent Malouda	Olympique Lyonnais	
Young Player of the Season	(France) Samir Nasri	Olympique de Marseille	
Goalkeeper of the Season	(France) Teddy Richert	FC Sochaux-Montbéliard	
Goal of the Season	(Brazil) Ilan	AS Saint-Étienne	
Manager of the Season	(France) Gérard Houllier	Olympique Lyonnais	

Team of the Year
Goalkeeper	(France) Teddy Richert (Sochaux)			
Defenders	(France) Bacary Sagna (Auxerre)	(Brazil) Cris (Lyon)	(Brazil) Vitorino Hilton (Lens)	(France) Éric Abidal (Lyon)
Midfielders	(Ivory Coast) Kader Keïta (Lille)	(France) Samir Nasri (Marseille)	(Ivory Coast) Seydou Keita (Lens)	(France) Florent Malouda (Lyon)
Forwards	(France) Steve Savidan (Valenciennes)		(Sweden) Johan Elmander (Toulouse)	

== Attendances ==
No.	Club	Average attendance	Change	Highest
1	Olympique de Marseille	51,604	4.0%	57,376
2	Olympique lyonnais	38,546	0.2%	40,363
3	Paris Saint-Germain FC	36,361	-10.2%	44,431
4	RC Lens	34,362	0.5%	40,567
5	FC Nantes	30,159	2.4%	35,828
6	AS Saint-Étienne	29,391	-0.8%	35,201
7	Stade rennais	25,135	0.5%	29,425
8	Girondins de Bordeaux	24,901	2.7%	32,253
9	Toulouse FC	21,572	14.2%	35,164
10	AS Nancy	18,334	6.8%	20,077
11	Valenciennes FC	14,814	70.9%	16,513
12	FC Sochaux	14,676	2.9%	19,990
13	LOSC	14,561	10.1%	17,355
14	CS Sedan	14,130	23.2%	22,779
15	FC Lorient	13,587	57.0%	15,752
16	ESTAC	12,702	-8.0%	18,579
17	OGC Nice	11,336	4.0%	15,030
18	Le Mans FC	11,333	-0.9%	15,976
19	AS Monaco	11,048	-1.2%	17,324
20	AJ auxerroise	10,246	-4.0%	19,415
