= David Jemmali =

Tunisian former professional footballer (born 1974)

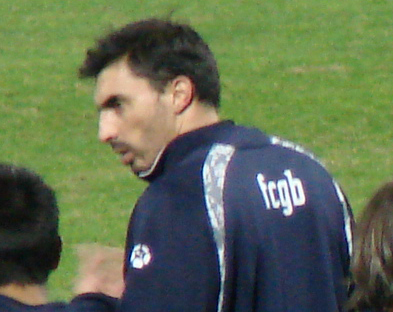
- Jemmali in 2007

Personal information
- Full name: David Jemmali
- Date of birth: 13 December 1974 (age 51)
- Place of birth: Toulouse, France
- Height: 1.87 m (6 ft 2 in)
- Position: Defender

Senior career*
Years	Team	Apps	(Gls)
1994–1997	Cannes	56	(0)
1997–2008	Bordeaux	240	(5)
2008–2010	Grenoble	28	(0)
Total		324	(5)

International career
2006–2007	Tunisia	10	(0)
- * Club domestic league appearances and goals

David Jemmali (born 13 December 1974) is a Tunisian former professional footballer who played as a defender. He spent most of his career at FC Girondins de Bordeaux.

In his time at Bordeaux, he won Ligue 1 in the 1998–99 season and the Coupe de la Ligue in 2002 and 2007.

Hoping for a selection to the France national team, he turned down several opportunities to represent Tunisia, country of his origins. However, when the 2006 World Cup was approaching, Jemmali accepted to join Tunisia and made his debut for the "Eagles of Carthage" on 1 March 2006 against Serbia and Montenegro. He was subsequently called up to the 2006 World Cup. Jemmali started Tunisia's first game of the 2006 World Cup against Saudi Arabia but did not appear in the other two group matches.
