= Florian Marange =

French footballer (born 1986)

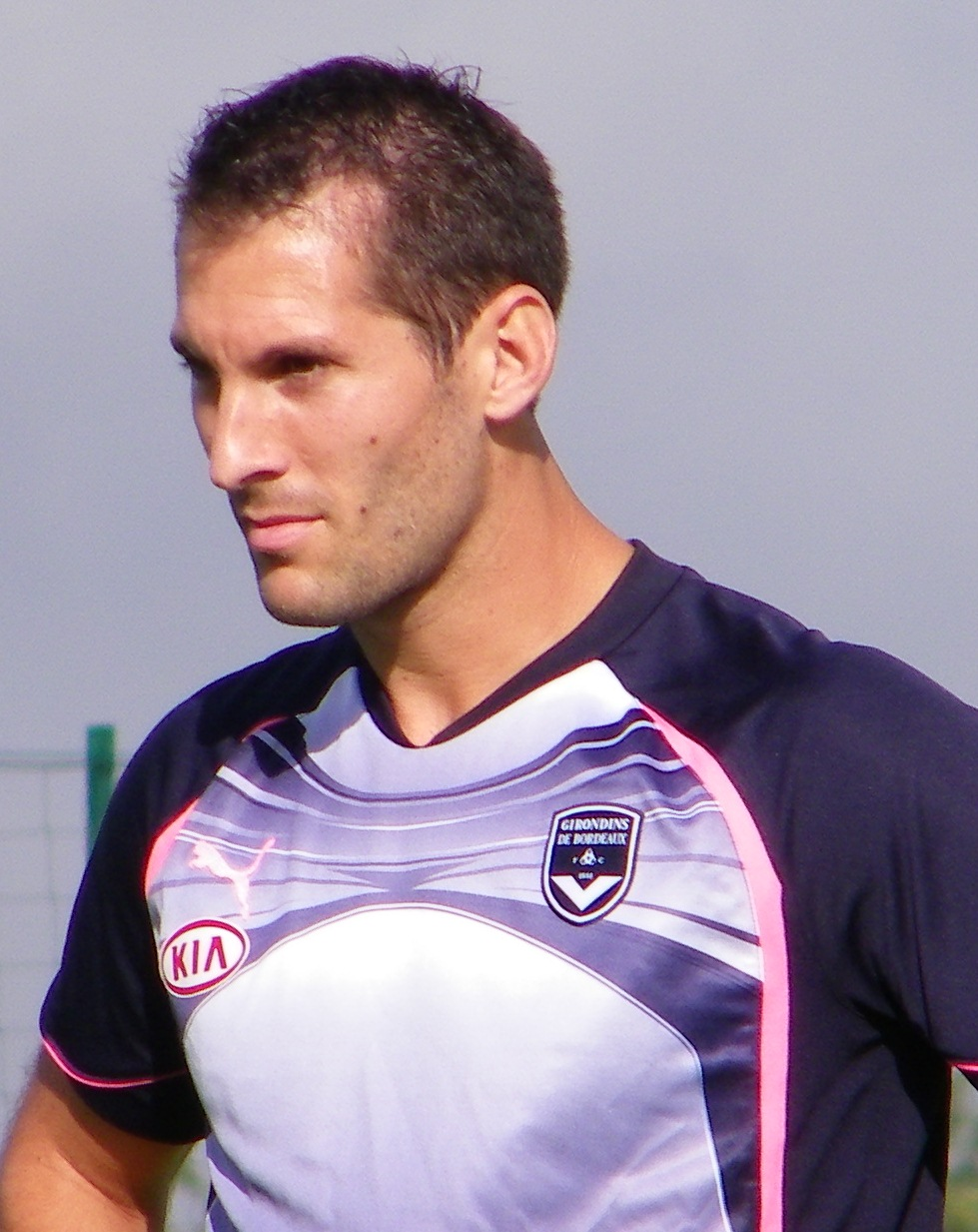
- Marange with Bordeaux in 2010

Personal information
- Date of birth: 3 March 1986 (age 40)
- Place of birth: Bruges, France
- Height: 1.76 m (5 ft 9 in)
- Position: Left-back

Youth career
- 2002–2004: Bordeaux

Senior career*
Years	Team	Apps	(Gls)
2004–2013	Bordeaux	83	(0)
2009	→ Le Havre (loan)	13	(1)
2009–2010	→ Nancy (loan)	16	(0)
2011–2013	Bordeaux B	8	(0)
2013	Crystal Palace	0	(0)
2014	Sochaux	15	(1)
2014–2017	Bastia	61	(0)
Total		196	(2)

International career
2006–2009	France U21	6	(0)
Medal record
Men's Football
Representing France
UEFA European Under-19 Championship
Winner	2005	Team
- * Club domestic league appearances and goals

Florian Marange (born 3 March 1986) is a French former professional footballer, who played as a left-back. His former clubs include Girondins de Bordeaux and Crystal Palace.

== Career ==
Marange began his career in 2002 with Bordeaux and was promoted to the first team in 2004. He made his first appearance against Paris Saint-Germain on 20 November 2005.

He was loaned out to Le Havre from Bordeaux on 8 January 2009 and returned on 1 July 2009.

On 16 August 2013, Marange signed a one-year deal with English side Crystal Palace, on a Bosman transfer. He made his debut on 27 August, in a 2–1 defeat against Bristol City in the second round of the League Cup. However, he was left out of Palace's 25-man Premier League squad and was described as 'slow' by manager Ian Holloway. He made only a few further appearances in friendly and reserve games for Palace before his contract was paid up in October.

In January 2014, Marange signed for Ligue 1 side Sochaux.

Six months later, he signed a two-year contract with Bastia.

== Honours ==
Bordeaux

- Coupe de la Ligue: 2006–07
- Coupe de France: 2012–13
