= Henrique (footballer, born 1983) =

Brazilian footballer

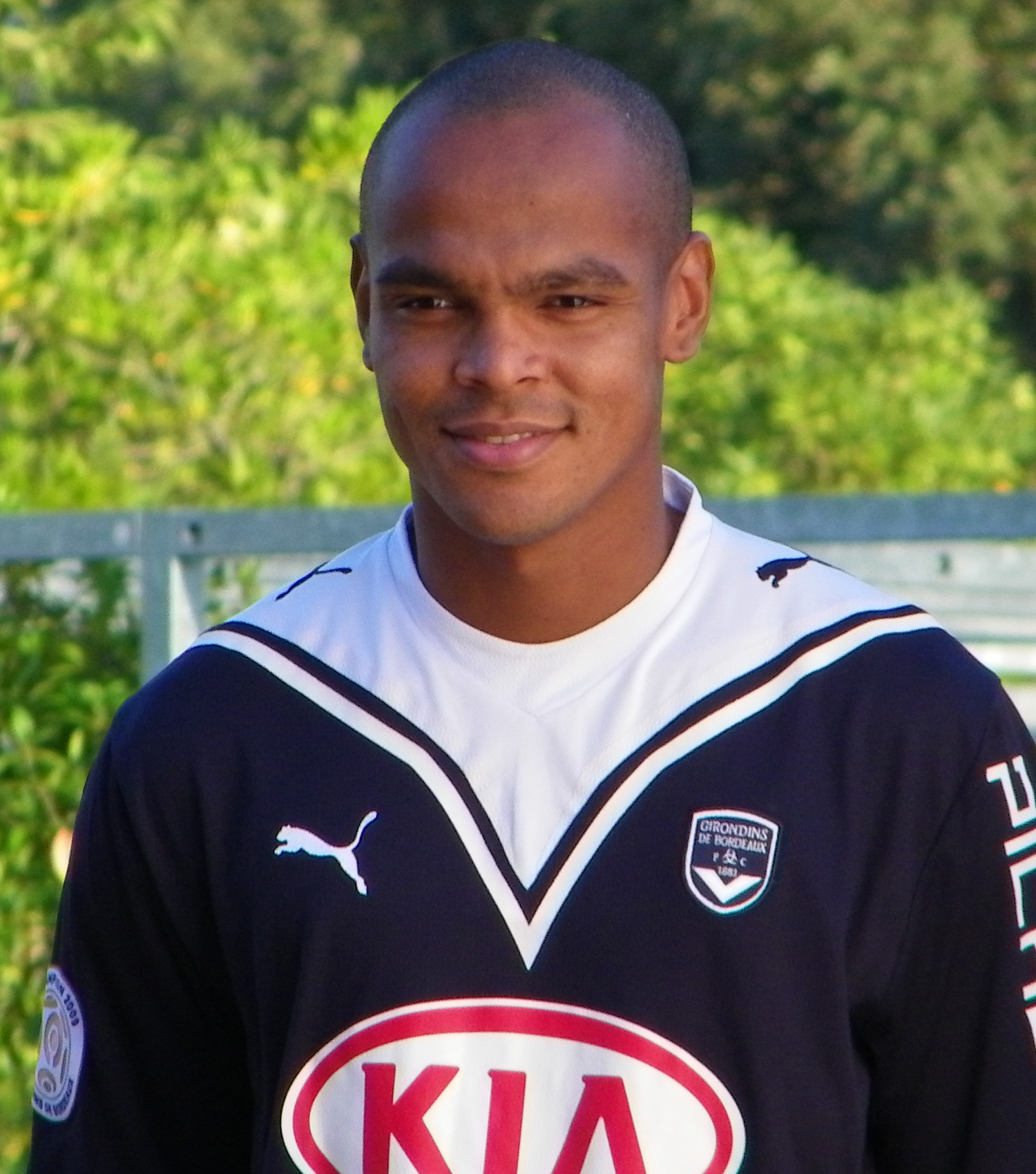

Personal information
- Full name: Carlos Henrique dos Santos Souza
- Date of birth: 2 May 1983 (age 43)
- Place of birth: São Gonçalo, Rio de Janeiro, Brazil
- Height: 1.88 m (6 ft 2 in)
- Position: Defender

Senior career*
Years	Team	Apps	(Gls)
2003–2005	Flamengo	71	(1)
2005–2014	Bordeaux	146	(10)
2014–2015	Fluminense	29	(0)
2016	Vitória	0	(0)
- * Club domestic league appearances and goals

Carlos Henrique dos Santos Souza, also known as Henrique (born 2 May 1983) is a Brazilian former footballer who played as a defender.

== Career ==
He joined the French club from Flamengo during the summer of 2005. On 31 March 2007, he scored at the 89th minute the goal that ensured Bordeaux's win 1–0 over Lyon in the final of the Coupe de la Ligue.

== Honours ==
Bordeaux

- Ligue 1: 2008–09
- Coupe de France: 2012–13
- Coupe de la Ligue: 2006–07, 2008–09
- Trophée Des Champions: 2008, 2009
