= 2006–07 Coupe de la Ligue =

French League Cup

Tournament details
- Country: France
- Dates: 15 August 2006 – 31 March 2007
- Teams: 42

Final positions
- Champions: Bordeaux (2nd title)
- Runners-up: Lyon

Tournament statistics
- Matches played: 42
- Goals scored: 106 (2.52 per match)
- Top goal scorer: Bafétimbi Gomis (3 goals)

The 2006–07 Coupe de la Ligue began on 15 August 2006. The final was held on 31 March 2007 at the Stade de France. The eventual winners were Bordeaux who beat Lyon 1–0 in the final.

== First round ==
The matches were played on 15 August 2006.

Team 1	Score	Team 2
Clermont	3–0	Laval
Niort	1–2	Libourne
Sète	2–0	Tours

== Second round ==
The matches were played on 22 August 2006.

Team 1	Score	Team 2
Ajaccio	0–1	Libourne
Amiens	2–1	Le Havre
Bastia	0–0 (a.e.t.) (3–5 p)	Sète
Clermont	1–0	Guingamp
Montpellier	3–0	Grenoble
Reims	1–0	Caen
Istres	2–1	Gueugnon
Châteauroux	2–4	Strasbourg
Dijon	3–2	Brest
Metz	0–1	Créteil

== Third round ==
The matches were played on 19 and 20 September 2006.

Team 1	Score	Team 2
Dijon	2–1	Amiens
Brest	1–2 (a.e.t.)	Montpellier
Istres	0–1	Lille
Nantes	0–2	Toulouse
Reims	3–1	Clermont
Auxerre	2–0	Strasbourg
Créteil	1–4	Lens
Montpellier	1–2	Marseille
Nancy	1–0	Nice
Paris Saint-Germain	3–1	Lorient
Rennes	2–1	Libourne
Sedan	0–1	Sochaux
Sète	1–4	Saint-Étienne
Troyes	1–2	Le Mans
Valenciennes	0–0 (a.e.t.) (4–5 p)	Monaco

== Round of 16 ==
The matches were played on 24 and 25 October 2006.

Team 1	Score	Team 2
Le Mans	3–1	Lens
Lille	0–2	Rennes
Nancy	2–1	Toulouse
Reims	0–0 (a.e.t.) (4–3 p)	Monaco
Sochaux	5–0	Dijon
Auxerre	0–1	Bordeaux
Lyon	2–1	Paris Saint-Germain
Saint-Étienne	4–1	Marseille

== Final draw ==
Quarter-finals
H	Bordeaux	1
A	Saint-Étienne	0
H	Rennes	0
A	Reims	1
H	Lyon	3
A	Nancy	1
H	Sochaux	1
A	Le Mans	2

Semi-finals
H	Reims	1
A	Bordeaux	2
H	Lyon	1
A	Le Mans	0

Final
Bordeaux	1
Lyon	0

== Final draw results ==
=== Quarter-finals ===
19 December 2006	Bordeaux	1–0 (a.e.t.)	Saint-Étienne	Bordeaux
	Fernando 99' (pen.)	(Report)		Stadium: Stade Chaban-Delmas; Attendance: 14,234; Referee: Bertrand Layec

20 December 2006	Rennes	0–1	Reims	Rennes
		(Report)	Faure 51'	Stadium: Stade de la Route de Lorient; Attendance: 18,329; Referee: Stéphane Lannoy

20 December 2006	Lyon	3–1	Nancy	Lyon
	Malouda 53'; Govou 78'; Diarra 90'	(Report)	Zerka 65'	Stadium: Stade Gerland; Attendance: 26,757; Referee: Damien Ledentu

20 December 2006	Sochaux	1–2	Le Mans	Sochaux
	Isabey 74'	(Report)	Samassa 48'; Grafite 51'	Stadium: Stade Bonal; Attendance: 17,437; Referee: Éric Poulat

=== Semi-finals ===
16 January 2007	Reims	1–2	Bordeaux	Reims
	Jemmali 85' (o.g.)	(Report)	Marange 58'; Darcheville 75' (pen.)	Stadium: Stade Auguste Delaune; Attendance: 8,693; Referee: Laurent Duhamel

17 January 2007	Lyon	1–0	Le Mans	Lyon
	Abidal 23'	(Report)		Stadium: Stade Gerland; Attendance: 27,541; Referee: Phillipe Kalt

=== Final ===
31 March 2007
20:45

Lyon	0–1	Bordeaux
		Henrique 89'

Stade de France, Saint-Denis
Attendance: 79,072
Referee: Hervé Piccirillo

=== Topscorer ===
Bafétimbi Gomis (3 goals)
