= 2015–16 AS Saint-Étienne season =

Saint-Étienne
2015–16 season
- Chairman: Benard Caiazzo; Roland Romeyer
- Manager: Christophe Galtier
- Stadium: Stade Geoffroy-Guichard
- Ligue 1: 6th
- Coupe de France: Quarter-finals
- Coupe de la Ligue: Round of 16
- UEFA Europa League: Round of 32
- Top goalscorer: League: Nolan Roux (9); All: Nolan Roux (11)
- Highest home attendance: 36,716 vs Paris Saint-Germain (2 March 2016)
- Lowest home attendance: 11,597 vs Ajaccio (21 January 2016)
Home colours	Away colours	Third colours

The 2015–16 AS Saint-Étienne season was the 83rd professional season of the club since its creation in 1933.

== Players ==
French teams are limited to four players without EU citizenship. Hence, the squad list includes only the principal nationality of each player; several non-European players on the squad have dual citizenship with an EU country. Also, players from the ACP countries—countries in Africa, the Caribbean, and the Pacific that are signatories to the Cotonou Agreement—are not counted against non-EU quotas due to the Kolpak ruling.

=== Current squad ===
As of 1 February 2016.

Note: Flags indicate national team as defined under FIFA eligibility rules; some limited exceptions apply. Players may hold more than one non-FIFA nationality.

No.	Pos.	Nation	Player
1	GK	FRA	Anthony Maisonnial
2	DF	FRA	Kévin Théophile-Catherine
3	DF	FRA	Pierre-Yves Polomat
4	FW	MAR	Oussama Tannane
5	MF	FRA	Vincent Pajot
6	MF	FRA	Jérémy Clément
7	FW	FRA	Jean-Christophe Bahebeck (on loan from Paris SG)
8	MF	FRA	Benjamin Corgnet
9	FW	FRA	Nolan Roux
10	MF	FRA	Renaud Cohade
11	MF	FRA	Valentin Eysseric (on loan from Nice)
13	DF	FRA	Franck Tabanou (on loan from Swansea City)
14	FW	FRA	Neal Maupay
15	MF	CPV	Erin Pinheiro
16	GK	FRA	Stéphane Ruffier

No.	Pos.	Nation	Player
17	MF	NOR	Ole Selnæs
18	MF	FRA	Fabien Lemoine
19	DF	GUI	Florentin Pogba
20	DF	FRA	Jonathan Brison
21	FW	FRA	Romain Hamouma
22	FW	FRA	Kévin Monnet-Paquet
23	FW	NOR	Alexander Søderlund
24	DF	FRA	Loïc Perrin (captain)
25	DF	FRA	Kévin Malcuit
26	DF	SEN	Moustapha Bayal Sall
27	FW	SLO	Robert Berić
29	DF	FRA	François Clerc
30	GK	FRA	Jessy Moulin
32	DF	CMR	Benoît Assou-Ekotto
33	DF	FRA	Ronaël Pierre-Gabriel

=== Out on loan ===
Note: Flags indicate national team as defined under FIFA eligibility rules; some limited exceptions apply. Players may hold more than one non-FIFA nationality.

No.	Pos.	Nation	Player
—	DF	FRA	Paul Baysse (on loan at Nice)
—	MF	CIV	Ismaël Diomande (on loan at Caen)
—	FW	FRA	Jonathan Bamba (on loan at Paris FC)

No.	Pos.	Nation	Player
—	FW	FRA	Yohan Mollo (on loan at Krylia Sovetov)
—	FW	FRA	Dylan Saint-Louis (on loan at Evian)

== Transfer ==
=== Transfers in ===
Date	Pos.	Player	Age	Moved from	Fee	Notes
1 July 2015	DF	(France) Kévin Théophile-Catherine	25	(England) Cardiff City	£1.4 million	
1 July 2015	MF	(France) Vincent Pajot	24	(France) Rennes	Free transfer	
1 July 2015	DF	(Cameroon) Benoît Assou-Ekotto	31	Unattached	Free transfer	
14 July 2015	MF	(Lithuania) Dovydas Virkšas	18	(Lithuania) Atlantas	€155,000	
21 July 2015	FW	(France) Nolan Roux	27	(France) Lille	Undisclosed	
10 August 2015	FW	(France) Neal Maupay	18	(France) Nice	Undisclosed	
28 August 2015	DF	(France) Kévin Malcuit	24	(France) Chamois Niortais	Undisclosed	
31 August 2015	FW	(Slovenia) Robert Berić	24	(Austria) Rapid Wien	Undisclosed	
4 January 2016	FW	(Norway) Alexander Søderlund	28	(Norway) Rosenborg	Undisclosed	
12 January 2016	DF	(Morocco) Oussama Tannane	21	(Netherlands) Heracles Almelo	Undisclosed	
1 February 2016	MF	(Norway) Ole Selnæs	21	(Norway) Rosenborg	Undisclosed	

=== Loans in ===
Date	Pos.	Player	Age	Loaned from	Return date	Notes
10 August 2015	FW	(France) Jean-Christophe Bahebeck	22	(France) Paris Saint-Germain	30 June 2016	
18 August 2015	MF	(France) Valentin Eysseric	23	(France) Nice	30 June 2016	
15 January 2016	DF	(France) Franck Tabanou	26	(England) Swansea City	30 June 2016	

=== Transfers out ===
Date	Pos.	Player	Age	Moved to	Fee	Notes
1 July 2015	DF	(France) Franck Tabanou	26	(England) Swansea City	Undisclosed	
1 July 2015	GK	(France) Baptiste Valette	22	(Belgium) Virton	Undisclosed	
1 July 2015	MF	(Cameroon) Landry N'Guémo	29	Unattached	Released	
17 July 2015	FW	(Turkey) Mevlüt Erdinç	28	(Germany) Hannover 96	Undisclosed	
31 July 2015	MF	(France) Allan Saint-Maximin	18	(France) Monaco	Undisclosed	
4 August 2015	FW	(Ivory Coast) Max Gradel	27	(England) AFC Bournemouth	Undisclosed	

=== Loans out ===
Date	Pos.	Player	Age	Loaned to	Return date	Notes
7 August 2015	DF	(France) Paul Baysse	27	(France) Nice	30 June 2016	
20 August 2015	FW	(France) Yohan Mollo	26	(Russia) Krylia Sovetov	30 June 2016	
12 January 2016	FW	(Ivory Coast) Jonathan Bamba	19	(France) Paris FC	30 June 2016	
25 January 2016	MF	(Ivory Coast) Ismaël Diomandé	25	(France) Caen	30 June 2016	
1 February 2016	FW	(France) Dylan Saint-Louis	20	(France) Evian	30 June 2016	

== Competitions ==
=== Ligue 1 ===
==== League table ====
Pos	Team	Pld	W	D	L	GF	GA	GD	Pts	Qualification or relegation
4	Nice	38	18	9	11	58	41	+17	63	Qualification for the Europa League group stage (Note: Since the winners of the 2015–16 Coupe de France and the 2015–16 Coupe de la Ligue, Paris Saint-Germain, qualified for European competition based on their league position, the spot awarded to the Coupe de France winners (Europa League group stage) was passed to the fourth-placed team and the spot awarded to the Coupe de la Ligue winners (Europa League third qualifying round) was passed to the sixth-placed team. The fifth-placed team received the spot in Europa League third qualifying round originally designated to the fourth-placed team.)
5	Lille	38	15	15	8	39	27	+12	60	Qualification for the Europa League third qualifying round
6	Saint-Étienne	38	17	7	14	42	37	+5	58	Qualification for the Europa League third qualifying round
7	Caen	38	16	6	16	39	52	−13	54	
8	Rennes	38	13	13	12	52	54	−2	52	

Source: Ligue 1, Soccerway
Rules for classification: 1) Points; 2) Goal difference; 3) Goals scored; 4) Head-to-head points; 5) Head-to-head goal difference; 6) Fairplay ranking.

==== Results summary ====
Overall								Home						Away					
Pld	W	D	L	GF	GA	GD	Pts	W	D	L	GF	GA	GD	W	D	L	GF	GA	GD
38	17	7	14	42	37	+5	58	10	4	5	25	15	+10	7	3	9	17	22	−5

Last updated: 14 May 2016.
Source: Competitive matches

==== Results by round ====
Round	1	2	3	4	5	6	7	8	9	10	11	12	13	14	15	16	17	18	19	20	21	22	23	24	25	26	27	28	29	30	31	32	33	34	35	36	37	38
Ground	A	H	A	H	A	H	A	H	A	H	A	H	A	H	H	A	H	A	H	A	H	A	H	A	A	H	A	H	A	A	H	A	H	A	H	H	A	H
Result	L	D	W	W	W	W	W	L	L	W	L	W	L	L	W	L	D	L	W	L	W	D	L	W	W	D	D	L	D	L	W	W	W	W	W	D	L	L
Position	13	14	10	7	4	3	2	2	5	4	5	4	5	7	5	7	6	7	6	7	5	6	8	5	4	4	4	7	7	8	7	6	6	5	5	4	5	6

Source: Ligue1
A = Away; H = Home; W = Win; D = Draw; L = Loss

==== Matches ====
Win Draw Loss

9 August 2015 1	Toulouse	2–1	Saint-Étienne	Toulouse
17:00 CEST (UTC+02:00)	Braithwaite 26'; Ben Yedder 53'; Pešić (red card) 87'	Report	Perrin 17'; Théophile-Catherine (yellow card) 66'	Stadium: Stadium Municipal; Attendance: 15,158; Referee: Bartolomeu Varela

15 August 2015 2	Saint-Étienne	1–1	Bordeaux	Saint-Étienne
17:00 CEST (UTC+02:00)	Bahebeck (yellow card) 39'; Clément (yellow card) 39'; Hamouma 58'	Report	Chantôme (yellow card) 51'; Saivet 90+1'	Stadium: Stade Geoffroy-Guichard; Attendance: 34,063; Referee: Nicolas Rainville

23 August 2015 3	Lorient	0–1	Saint-Étienne	Lorient
17:00 CEST (UTC+02:00)	Lecomte (red card) 1'	Report	Bayal Sall (yellow card) 31'; Hamouma (yellow card) 60', (goal) 87'; Monnet-Paquet (yellow card) 65'	Stadium: Stade du Moustoir; Attendance: 13,075; Referee: Frank Schneider

30 August 2015 4	Saint-Étienne	2–1	Bastia	Saint-Étienne
14:00 CEST (UTC+02:00)	Perrin 20'; Eysseric 62'; Clément (yellow card) 82'	Report	Djiku (red card) 4'; Danic 41'; Coulibaly (yellow card) 51'; Kamano (red card) 74'	Stadium: Stade Geoffroy-Guichard; Attendance: 26,249; Referee: Antony Gautier

12 September 2015 5	Montpellier	1–2	Saint-Étienne	Montpellier
20:00 CEST (UTC+02:00)	Dabo (yellow card) 37'; Cornette (yellow card) 42'; Marveaux (yellow card) 66', (goal) 90+2'	Report	Bayal Sall (yellow card) 18', (goal) 24'; Roux 59'; Polomat (yellow card) 61'	Stadium: Stade de la Mosson; Attendance: 10,734; Referee: Lionel Jaffredo

20 September 2015 6	Saint-Étienne	2–0	Nantes	Saint-Étienne
17:00 CEST (UTC+02:00)	Malcuit (yellow card) 18'; Bamba 26'; Berič (yellow card) 30', (goal) 47'	Report	Deaux (yellow card) 79'	Stadium: Stade Geoffroy-Guichard; Attendance: 28,846; Referee: Benoît Millot

23 September 2015 7	Troyes	0–1	Saint-Étienne	Troyes
19:00 CEST (UTC+02:00)	Ayasse (yellow card) 50'; Mavinga (yellow card) 66'; Nivet (yellow card) 82'	Report	Ayasse 13' (o.g.)	Stadium: Stade de l'Aube; Attendance: 12,090; Referee: Sébastien Moreira

27 September 2015 8	Saint-Étienne	1–4	Nice	Saint-Étienne
21:00 CEST (UTC+02:00)	Perrin 19'; Pajot (yellow card) 50'; Lemoine (yellow card) 63'; Polomat (yellow card) 75'; Eysseric (yellow card) 89'	Report	Koziello 5'; Seri (yellow card) 29', (goal) 53'; Ben Arfa 39', 45+1'; N. Mendy (red card) 62'; Le Marchand (red card) 82'	Stadium: Stade Geoffroy-Guichard; Attendance: 24,556; Referee: Bartolomeu Varela

4 October 2015 9	Caen	1–0	Saint-Étienne	Caen
17:00 CEST (UTC+02:00)	Delort 62'	Report	Diomande (yellow card) 41'; Brison (yellow card) 51'; Ruffier (yellow card) 90'	Stadium: Stade Michel d'Ornano; Attendance: 19,070; Referee: Johan Hamel

17 October 2015 10	Saint-Étienne	2–0	Gazélec Ajaccio	Saint Étienne
20:00 CEST (UTC+02:00)	Berić 20'; Monnet-Paquet 70'	Report		Stadium: Stade Geoffroy-Guichard; Attendance: 28,041; Referee: Stéphane Jochem

25 October 2015 11	Paris Saint-Germain	4–1	Saint-Étienne	Paris
21:00 CET (UTC+01:00)	Kurzawa 23'; Cavani 48'; Ibrahimović 67'; Lucas 87'	Report	Verratti 74' (o.g.)	Stadium: Parc des Princes; Attendance: 47,385; Referee: Clément Turpin

31 October 2015 12	Saint-Étienne	3–0	Stade de Reims	Saint Étienne
17:00 CET (UTC+01:00)	Eysseric (yellow card) 9', (goal) 83'; Berić 63'; Oniangué 68' (o.g.)	Report	Peuget (yellow card) 67'	Stadium: Stade Geoffroy-Guichard; Attendance: 28,825; Referee: Mikael Lesage

8 November 2015 13	Lyon	3–0	Saint-Étienne	Lyon
21:00 CET (UTC+01:00)	Rafael (yellow card) 33'; Lacazette 41', 59', 90+3'; Ferri (yellow card) 78'; Lopes (yellow card) 80'; Valbuena (yellow card) 84'	Report	Pajot (yellow card) 1'; Lemoine (yellow card) 6'; Hamouma (yellow card) 72'; Clément (yellow card) 86'	Stadium: Parc Olympique Lyonnais; Attendance: 38,752; Referee: Tony Chapron

22 November 2015 14	Saint-Étienne	0–2	Marseille	Saint Étienne
21:00 CET (UTC+01:00)	Hamouma (yellow card) 74'	Report	Batshuayi 41'; Nkoudou 51'; Nkoulou (yellow card) 74'	Stadium: Stade Geoffroy-Guichard; Attendance: 34,681; Referee: Fredy Fautrel

29 November 2015 15	Saint-Étienne	3–0	Guingamp	Saint Étienne
14:00 CET (UTC+01:00)	Eysseric (yellow card) 26', (goal) 87' (pen.); Sall (yellow card) 43' (yellow-red card) 90'; Hamouma 52'; Ruffier (yellow card) 69'; Roux 90+5'	Report	Dembélé (yellow card) 38'; Salibur (yellow card) 45+2'; Sankharé (yellow card) 52'	Stadium: Stade Geoffroy-Guichard; Attendance: 25,249; Referee: Ruddy Buquet

2 December 2015 16	Lille OSC	1–0	Saint-Étienne	Lille
21:00 CET (UTC+01:00)	Soumaoro (yellow card) 45+1'; Benzia 60'; Balmont (yellow card) 86'	Report	Assou-Ekotto (yellow card) 65'; Hamouma (yellow card) 67'	Stadium: Stade Pierre-Mauroy; Attendance: 29,103; Referee: Frank Schneider

6 December 2015 17	Saint-Étienne	1–1	Rennes	Saint Étienne
21:00 CET (UTC+01:00)	Maupay (yellow card) 69'; Lemoine (yellow card) 75'; Eysseric 78' (pen.)	Report	Pedro Henrique 40', (yellow card) 41'; Armand (yellow card) 80'; Sylla (yellow card) 86'	Stadium: Stade Geoffroy-Guichard; Attendance: 26,668; Referee: Nicolas Rainville

13 December 2015 18	Monaco	1–0	Saint-Étienne	Fontvieille, Monaco
14:00 CET (UTC+01:00)	Carvalho (yellow card) 21'; Fabinho (yellow card) 78', (goal) 82' (pen.); Toulalan (yellow card) 90+2'	Report	Malcuit (yellow card) 25' (yellow-red card) 64'; Pajot (yellow card) 29'; Sall (yellow card) 50'	Stadium: Stade Louis II; Attendance: 7,213; Referee: Mikael Lesage

20 December 2015 19	Saint-Étienne	1–0	Angers SCO	Saint Étienne
14:00 CET (UTC+01:00)	Lemoine (yellow card) 10'; Corgnet 61'; Ruffier (yellow card) 69'; Roux (yellow card) 70'	Report	Thomas (yellow card) 39'; Sanu (yellow card) 73'; Saïss (yellow card) 85'	Stadium: Stade Geoffroy-Guichard; Attendance: 30,985; Referee: Bartolomeu Varela

10 January 2016 20	Nantes	2–1	Saint-Étienne	Nantes
14:00 CET (UTC+01:00)	Audel 29'; Sigþórsson 77'; Gillet (yellow card) 84'	Report	Roux 14' (pen.); Pajot (yellow card) 31'; Brison (yellow card) 86'; Maupay (yellow card) 90+3'	Stadium: Stade de la Beaujoire; Attendance: 25,509; Referee: Stéphane Lannoy

17 January 2016 21	Saint-Étienne	1–0	Lyon	Saint Étienne
21:00 CET (UTC+01:00)	Monnet-Paquet (yellow card) 18'; Lemoine (yellow card) 48'; Pajot (yellow card) 62'; Søderlund 76'	Report	Ghezzal (yellow card) 77'	Stadium: Stade Geoffroy-Guichard; Attendance: 36,503; Referee: Clément Turpin

24 January 2016 22	Stade de Reims	1–1	Saint-Étienne	Reims
17:00 CET (UTC+01:00)	Tacalfred (yellow card) 15'; Diego (yellow card) 77'; Mandi 89'	Report	Théophile-Catherine (yellow card) 48'; Bahebeck 60'; Pogba (yellow card) 64'	Stadium: Stade Auguste Delaune; Attendance: 13,048; Referee: Ruddy Buquet

31 January 2016 23	Saint-Étienne	0–2	Paris Saint-Germain	Saint-Étienne
21:00 CET (UTC+01:00)	Søderlund (yellow card) 14'; Lemoine (yellow card) 65'; Cohade (yellow card) 79'; Clément (yellow card) 84'	Report	Kimpembe (yellow card) 9'; Motta (yellow card) 36'; Ibrahimović 61', 90+1'	Stadium: Stade Geoffroy-Guichard; Attendance: 32,689; Referee: Lionel Jaffredo

4 February 2016 24	Rennes	0–1	Saint-Étienne	Rennes
21:00 CET (UTC+01:00)	Sylla (yellow card) 26'; Mexer (yellow card) 73'	Report	Bahebeck (yellow card) 20'; Sall (yellow card) 71', (goal) 74'	Stadium: Roazhon Park; Attendance: 18,049; Referee: Benoît Millot

7 February 2016 25	Bordeaux	1–4	Saint-Étienne	Bordeaux
17:00 CET (UTC+01:00)	Arambarri (yellow card) 2'; Yambéré 10', (yellow card) 84'; Crivelli (yellow card) 22'; Contento (yellow card) 90+2'; Diabaté (red card) 90+2'	Report	Pajot 4'; Tannane 7'; Cohade (yellow card) 18'; Søderlund 70'; Roux 75'	Stadium: Nouveau Stade de Bordeaux; Attendance: 34,377; Referee: Benoît Bastien

14 February 2016 26	Saint-Étienne	1–1	Monaco	Saint-Étienne
17:00 CET (UTC+1)	Bayal Sall 57'	Report	Wallace (yellow card) 56'; Vágner Love 84'	Stadium: Stade Geoffroy-Guichard; Attendance: 31,868; Referee: Fredy Fautrel

21 February 2016 27	Marseille	1–1	Saint-Étienne	Marseille
14:00 CET (UTC+01:00)	Nkoulou (red card) 60'; Batshuayi 90+4'	Report	Sall (yellow card) 9'; Monnet-Paquet 85'	Stadium: Stade Vélodrome; Attendance: 50,570; Referee: Clément Turpin

28 February 2016 28	Saint-Étienne	1–2	Caen	Saint-Étienne
17:00 CET (UTC+01:00)	Tannane (yellow card) 6'; Lemoine (yellow card) 36'; Eysseric 90+1'	Report	Adeoti (yellow card) 4'; Delort 78'; Rodelin 82'	Stadium: Stade Geoffroy-Guichard; Attendance: 29,475; Referee: Frank Schneider

5 March 2016 29	Angers	0–0	Saint-Étienne	Angers
20:00 CET (UTC+01:00)	Sunu (yellow card) 26'; Mangani (yellow card) 63'; Thomas (yellow card) 66'; Saïss (yellow card) 75'	Report	Lemoine (yellow card) 22'; Eysseric (yellow card) 67'; Clément (yellow card) 90+2'	Stadium: Stade Jean-Bouin; Attendance: 15,892; Referee: Antony Gautier

12 March 2016 30	Guingamp	2–0	Saint-Étienne	Guingamp
20:00 CET (UTC+1)	Briand 7'; Privat 24'	Report	Maupay (yellow card) 18'; Sall (yellow card) 45+1'	Stadium: Stade du Roudourou; Referee: Stéphane Jochem

19 March 2016 31	Saint-Étienne	3–0	Montpellier	Saint-Étienne
17:00 CET (UTC+01:00)	Lemoine (yellow card) 66'; Roux 74'; Tannane 80'; Eysseric 84'	Report	Boudebouz (yellow card) 45'; Congré (yellow card) 90'	Stadium: Stade Geoffroy-Guichard; Attendance: 28,037; Referee: Jérôme Miguelgorry

2 April 2016 32	Gazélec Ajaccio	0–2	Saint-Étienne	Ajaccio
20:00 CET (UTC+01:00)	Boutaïb (yellow card) 25'	Report	Roux 15'; Théophile-Catherine 58'	Stadium: Stade Ange Casanova; Attendance: 3,665; Referee: Clément Turpin

9 April 2016 33	Saint-Étienne	1–0	Troyes	Saint-Étienne
20:00 CET (UTC+01:00)	Sall (yellow card) 37'; Roux (yellow card) 60'; Maupay 75'	Report	Pi (yellow card) 20'; Thiago Xavier (yellow card) 52'	Stadium: Stade Geoffroy-Guichard; Attendance: 29,824; Referee: Johan Hamel

16 April 2016 34	Bastia	0–1	Saint-Étienne	Bastia
20:00 CET (UTC+01:00)	Danic (yellow card) 24'; Mostefa (yellow card) 62'; Palmieri (yellow card) 70'	Report	Tannane (yellow card) 61'; Pajot (yellow card) 73'; Roux 75'	Stadium: Stade Armand Cesari; Referee: Benoît Millot

30 April 2016 35	Saint-Étienne	0–0	Toulouse	Saint-Étienne
17:00 CET (UTC+01:00)	Sall (yellow card) 23'; Clément (yellow card) 29'; Perrin (red card) 77'	Report	Diop (yellow card) 43'; Yago (yellow card) 45+1'	Stadium: Stade Geoffroy-Guichard; Attendance: 30,578; Referee: Lionel Jaffredo

7 May 2016 37	Nice	2–0	Saint-Étienne	Nice
21:00 CET (UTC+01:00)	Genevois (yellow card) 74'; Cardinale (yellow card) 75'; Germain 86', 89'	Report	Eysseric (yellow card) 22'; Malcuit (yellow card) 54' (yellow-red card) 56'; Cohade (yellow card) 74'; Tabanou (red card) 74'; Lemoine (yellow card) 75'	Stadium: Allianz Riviera; Attendance: 35,596; Referee: Benoît Millot

14 May 2016 38	Saint-Étienne	0–1	Lille	Saint-Étienne
21:00 CEST (UTC+2)	Roux (yellow card) 42'; Ruffier (yellow card) 90+4'	Report	Éder 41' (pen.); Nangis (yellow card) 83'	Stadium: Stade Geoffroy-Guichard; Attendance: 39,550; Referee: Clément Turpin

=== Coupe de la Ligue ===
16 December 2015 Round of 16	Paris Saint-Germain	1–0	Saint-Étienne	Paris
21:00 CET (UTC+01:00)	Stambouli (yellow card) 55'; Lucas (yellow card) 57'; Cavani 86'	Report	Pierre-Gabriel (yellow card) 41'	Stadium: Parc des Princes; Attendance: 47,346; Referee: Amaury Delerue

=== Coupe de France ===
3 January 2016 Round of 64	US Raon-l'Étape	1–1 (a.e.t.) (3–4 p)	Saint-Étienne	Raon-l'Étape
14:15 CET (UTC+01:00)	Rother (yellow card) 3'; Clauss 58'; Mascarelli (yellow card) 73'	Report	Maupay 21'; Brison (yellow card) 41'; Malcuit (yellow card) 110'	Stadium: Stade Paul-Gasser; Attendance: 4,700; Referee: Sébastien Moreira

21 January 2016 Round of 32	Saint-Étienne	2–1 (a.e.t.)	AC Ajaccio	Saint-Étienne
21:00 CET (UTC+01:00)	Bahebeck 10'; Corgnet 120'	Report	Frikeche 86'	Stadium: Stade Geoffroy-Guichard; Attendance: 11,597; Referee: Benoît Bastien

10 February 2016 Round of 16	Troyes	1–2 (a.e.t.)	Saint-Étienne	Troyes
19:00 CET (UTC+01:00)	Veškovac (yellow card) 61'; Nivet 78'; Karaboue (yellow card) 81'	Report	Dekoke (yellow card) 49'; Tannane 62'; Pajot (yellow card) 76'; Cohade (yellow card) 105'; Maupay 107'; Roux (yellow card) 118'	Stadium: Stade de l'Aube; Attendance: 5,747; Referee: Antony Gautier

2 March 2016 Quarter-finals	Saint-Étienne	1–3	Paris Saint-Germain	Saint-Étienne
21:05 CET (UTC+01:00)	Malcuit (yellow card) 24'; Eysseric 43' (pen.)	Report	Cavani 12'; Marquinhos 12'; Stambouli (yellow card) 68'; Rabiot (yellow card) 77'; Lucas 90'	Stadium: Stade Geoffroy Guichard; Attendance: 36,716; Referee: Benoît Bastien

=== UEFA Europa League ===
==== Third Qualifying Round ====
30 July 2015 1st Leg	Târgu Mureș (Romania)	0–3	(France) Saint-Étienne	Târgu Mureș, Romania
21:00 EEST (UTC+03:00)	Mureșan (yellow card) 45'; Gorobsov (yellow card) 85'; N'Doye (yellow card) 90+1'	Report	Diomande 24'; Théophile-Catherine (yellow card) 30'; Pogba (yellow card) 37'; Hamouma 75', 83'	Stadium: Stadionul Trans-Sil; Attendance: 6,498; Referee: Pol van Boekel (Netherlands)

6 August 2015 2nd Leg	Saint-Étienne (France)	1–2 (4–2 agg.)	(Romania) Târgu Mureș	Saint-Étienne, France
20:00 CEST (UTC+02:00)	Brison (yellow card) 61'; González 72' (o.g.); Mollo (yellow card) 90'	Report	Balić (yellow card) 23'; Pedro 39'; González 62', (yellow card) 86'; Golański (yellow card) 88'; Mureșan (yellow card) 90+3'; Gorobsov (yellow card) 90+3'	Stadium: Stade Geoffroy-Guichard; Attendance: 27,284; Referee: Craig Pawson (England)

==== Play-off Round ====
20 August 2015 1st Leg	Milsami (Moldova)	1–1	(France) Saint-Étienne	Chișinău, Moldova
20:30 EEST (UTC+03:00)	Shedrack (yellow card) 15'; Banović (yellow card) 39'; Bud 56'; Erhan (yellow card) 61'; Rhaili (yellow card) 84'; Racu (yellow card) 87'	Report	Bahebeck (yellow card) 20'; Hamouma 40', (red card) 55'	Stadium: Stadionul Zimbru; Attendance: 6,072; Referee: Paweł Gil (Poland)

27 August 2015 2nd Leg	Saint-Étienne (France)	1–0 (2–1 agg.)	(Moldova) Milsami	Saint-Étienne, France
CEST (UTC+02:00)	Corgnet 15'	Report	Rhaili (yellow card) 4'; Cojocari (yellow card) 42'; Pătraș (yellow card) 86'	Stadium: Stade Geoffroy-Guichard; Attendance: 22,456; Referee: Aleksei Eskov (Russia)

==== Group stage ====
Pos	Team	Pld	W	D	L	GF	GA	GD	Pts	Qualification	LAZ	SET	DNI	ROS
1	(Italy) Lazio	6	4	2	0	13	6	+7	14	Advance to knockout phase	—	3–2	3–1	3–1
2	(France) Saint-Étienne	6	2	3	1	10	7	+3	9	Advance to knockout phase	1–1	—	3–0	2–2
3	(Ukraine) Dnipro Dnipropetrovsk	6	2	1	3	6	8	−2	7		1–1	0–1	—	3–0
4	(Norway) Rosenborg	6	0	2	4	4	12	−8	2		0–2	1–1	0–1	—

Source: Soccerway
Rules for classification: Group stage tiebreakers

17 September 2015 1	Saint-Étienne (France)	2–2	(Norway) Rosenborg	Saint-Étienne, France
21:05 CEST	Berić 4'; Clément (yellow card) 52'; Eysseric (yellow card) 61'; Bayal Sall (yellow card) 83'; Roux 87' (pen.)	Report	Mikkelsen 16'; Skjelvik (yellow card) 28'; Svensson (yellow card) 30', (goal) 78'; Midtsjø (yellow card) 56'	Stadium: Stade Geoffroy-Guichard; Attendance: 22,826; Referee: Christian Dingert (Germany)

1 October 2015 2	Lazio (Italy)	3–2	(France) Saint-Étienne	Rome, Italy
19:00 CEST (UTC+02:00)	Onazi 22', (yellow card) 25'; Hoedt 48'; Biglia 80'	Report	Sall 6', (red card) 77'; Berić (red card) 33'; Monnet-Paquet 84'	Stadium: Stadio Olimpico; Attendance: 11,039; Referee: Halis Özkahya (Turkey)

22 October 2015 3	Dnipro Dnipropetrovsk (Ukraine)	0–1	(France) Saint-Étienne	Dnipropetrovsk, Ukraine
19:00 CEST (UTC+02:00)	Rotan (yellow card) 21'; Douglas (yellow card) 65'	Report	Hamouma 44'; Diomande (yellow card) 83'; Ruffier (yellow card) 90+3'	Stadium: Dnipro-Arena; Attendance: 225; Referee: Alon Yefet (Israel)

5 November 2015 4	Saint-Étienne (France)	3–0	(Ukraine) Dnipro Dnipropetrovsk	Saint-Étienne, France
CET (UTC+01:00)	Perrin (yellow card) 24'; Monnet-Paquet 38'; Pajot (yellow card) 51'; Berić 52'; Hamouma 65'	Report	Seleznyov (yellow card) 17'; Matos (yellow card) 18'; Edmar (yellow card) 37'; Rotan (yellow card) 84'; Fedetskyi (yellow card) 90+2'	Stadium: Stade Geoffroy-Guichard; Attendance: 24,582; Referee: Mattias Gestranius (Finland)

26 November 2015 5	Rosenborg (Norway)	1–1	(France) Saint-Étienne	Trondheim, Norway
CET (UTC+01:00)	Søderlund 40'; Selnæs (yellow card) 79'; Jensen (yellow card) 86'	Report	Assou-Ekotto (yellow card) 49'; Roux 80' (pen.); Hamouma (yellow card) 84'; Pajot (yellow card) 89'; Maupay (yellow card) 89'	Stadium: Lerkendal Stadion; Attendance: 15,038; Referee: Vitali Meshkov (Russia)

10 December 2015 6	Saint-Étienne (France)	1–1	(Italy) Lazio	Saint-Étienne, France
21:05 CET (UTC+01:00)	Brison (yellow card) 42'; Eysseric 76'	Report	Hoedt (yellow card) 5'; Maurício (yellow card) 33'; Matri 52'; Cataldi (yellow card) 73'	Stadium: Stade Geoffroy-Guichard; Attendance: 28,954; Referee: Kevin Blom (Netherlands)

==== Knockout phase ====
===== Round of 32 =====
18 February 2016 First Leg	Saint-Étienne (France)	3–2	(Switzerland) Basel	Saint-Étienne, France
19:00 CET (UTC+01:00)	Sall 9'; Monnet-Paquet 39'; Tannane (yellow card) 60'; Pajot (yellow card) 72'; Bahebeck 77'	Report	Steffen (yellow card) 25'; Samuel 44' (yellow card) 74'; Janko 56' (pen.), (yellow card) 88'; Xhaka (yellow card) 60'	Stadium: Stade Geoffroy-Guichard; Attendance: 27,013; Referee: Tasos Sidiropoulos (Greece)

25 February 2016 Second Leg	Basel (Switzerland)	2–1 (4–4 (a) agg.)	(France) Saint-Étienne	Basel, Switzerland
21:05 CET (UTC+01:00)	Zuffi 15', 90+2'; Embolo (yellow card) 55' (red card) 84'	Report	(yellow card) 31' Tannane; (yellow card) 63' Pogba; (yellow card) 82' (red card) 82' Eysseric; 90' Sall	Stadium: St. Jakob-Park; Attendance: 20,976; Referee: Danny Makkelie (Netherlands)

== Statistics ==
=== Appearances and goals ===
As of match played 12 March 2016

No.	Pos	Nat	Player	Total		Ligue 1		Coupe de France		Coupe de la Ligue		Europa League	
No.	Pos	Nat	Player	Apps	Goals	Apps	Goals	Apps	Goals	Apps	Goals	Apps	Goals
1	GK	(France) FRA	Anthony Maisonnial	0	0	0	0	0	0	0	0	0	0
2	DF	(France) FRA	Kévin Théophile-Catherine	23	0	14	0	3	0	0	0	5+1	0
3	DF	(France) FRA	Pierre-Yves Polomat	19	0	9+4	0	0	0	1	0	3+2	0
4	FW	(Morocco) MAR	Oussama Tannane	9	2	5+1	1	1	1	0	0	2	0
5	MF	(France) FRA	Vincent Pajot	32	1	18+6	1	2	0	0	0	4+2	0
6	MF	(France) FRA	Jérémy Clément	32	0	18+2	0	2	0	1	0	8+1	0
7	FW	(France) FRA	Jean-Christophe Bahebeck	20	3	8+5	1	1	1	0	0	3+3	1
8	MF	(France) FRA	Benjamin Corgnet	24	3	4+11	1	0+2	1	1	0	4+2	1
9	FW	(France) FRA	Nolan Roux	36	6	14+7	4	3+1	0	0	0	10+1	2
10	MF	(France) FRA	Renaud Cohade	19	0	8+4	0	2+1	0	1	0	3	0
11	MF	(France) FRA	Valentin Eysseric	33	7	16+7	5	4	1	0	0	5+1	1
13	MF	(France) FRA	Franck Tabanou	11	0	7+1	0	0+1	0	0	0	2	0
14	FW	(France) FRA	Neal Maupay	21	2	4+9	0	2+2	2	1	0	1+2	0
15	FW	(Cape Verde) CPV	Erin Pinheiro	4	0	0+2	0	0	0	0+1	0	0+1	0
16	GK	(France) FRA	Stéphane Ruffier	45	0	30	0	4	0	0	0	11	0
17	DF	(Norway) NOR	Ole Selnæs	5	0	2+1	0	2	0	0	0	0	0
18	MF	(France) FRA	Fabien Lemoine	36	0	22+4	0	1	0	0	0	8+1	0
19	DF	(Guinea) GUI	Florentin Pogba	32	0	19+2	0	3	0	0	0	8	0
20	DF	(France) FRA	Jonathan Brison	15	0	4+3	0	3	0	1	0	2+2	0
21	MF	(France) FRA	Romain Hamouma	29	8	17+3	3	0	0	0	0	5+4	5
22	FW	(France) FRA	Kevin Monnet-Paquet	37	5	19+6	2	1	0	0	0	8+3	3
23	FW	(Norway) NOR	Alexander Søderlund	11	3	9+2	2	0	1	0	0	0	0
24	DF	(France) FRA	Loïc Perrin	28	3	18	3	2	0	0	0	8	0
25	DF	(France) FRA	Kévin Malcuit	9	0	6	0	3	0	0	0	0	0
26	DF	(Senegal) SEN	Moustapha Bayal Sall	33	6	22+1	3	0+1	0	0	0	8+1	3
27	FW	(Slovenia) SLO	Robert Berić	11	5	7+2	3	0	0	0	0	2	2
28	MF	(Ivory Coast) CIV	Ismaël Diomande	13	1	3+2	0	0+1	0	0	0	4+3	1
29	DF	(France) FRA	François Clerc	16	0	10	0	0	0	0	0	6	0
30	GK	(France) FRA	Jessy Moulin	2	0	0	0	0	0	1	0	1	0
31	DF	(Mali) MLI	Benjamin Karamoko	1	0	0	0	0	0	0	0	1	0
32	DF	(Cameroon) CMR	Benoît Assou-Ekotto	20	0	11+1	0	1	0	0	0	7	0
33	DF	(France) FRA	Ronaël Pierre-Gabriel	6	0	3	0	1+1	0	1	0	0	0
34	MF	(France) FRA	Dekoke	2	0	0	0	1	0	1	0	0	0
36	MF	(Bosnia and Herzegovina) BIH	Cazim Suljic	1	0	0	0	0	0	0+1	0	0	0
37	FW	(France) FRA	Hugo Roussey	1	0	0	0	0	0	0+1	0	0	0
—	FW	(France) FRA	Dylan Saint-Louis	3	0	0	0	0+2	0	1	0	0	0
Players away from the club on loan:
11	FW	(France) FRA	Yohan Mollo	3	0	0+1	0	0	0	0	0	1+1	0
Players who appeared for Saint-Étienne no longer at the club:
7	FW	(Ivory Coast) CIV	Max Gradel	1	0	0	0	0	0	0	0	1	0
17	FW	(Ivory Coast) CIV	Jonathan Bamba	11	1	4+1	1	1	0	1	0	0+4	0

=== Goalscorers ===
As of match played 12 March 2016

Place	Position	Nation	Number	Name	Ligue 1	Coupe de France	Coupe de la Ligue	UEFA Europa League	Total
1	MF	(France)	21	Romain Hamouma	3	0	0	5	8
2	MF	(France)	11	Valentin Eysseric	5	1	0	1	7
3	FW	(France)	9	Nolan Roux	4	0	0	2	6
3	DF	(Senegal)	26	Moustapha Bayal Sall	3	0	0	3	6
4	FW	(Slovenia)	27	Robert Berić	3	0	0	2	5
4	FW	(France)	22	Kevin Monnet-Paquet	2	0	0	3	5
				Own goals	3	0	0	1	4
5	DF	(France)	24	Loïc Perrin	3	0	0	0	3
5	MF	(France)	8	Benjamin Corgnet	1	1	0	1	3
5	FW	(France)	7	Jean-Christophe Bahebeck	1	1	0	1	3
6	FW	(Norway)	23	Alexander Søderlund	2	0	0	0	2
6	FW	(France)	14	Neal Maupay	0	2	0	0	2
6	FW	(Morocco)	4	Tanane	1	1	0	0	2
7	FW	(Ivory Coast)	17	Jonathan Bamba	1	0	0	0	1
7	MF	(Ivory Coast)	28	Ismaël Diomande	0	0	0	1	1
7	MF	(France)	5	Vincent Pajot	1	0	0	0	1
				TOTALS	33	6	0	20	59

=== Disciplinary record ===
As of match played 12 March 2016

Number	Nation	Position	Name	Ligue 1			Coupe de France			Coupe de la Ligue			UEFA Europa League			Total		
Number	Nation	Position	Name	Yellow card	Red card	(yellow card) (yellow-red card)	Yellow card	Red card	(yellow card) (yellow-red card)	Yellow card	Red card	(yellow card) (yellow-red card)	Yellow card	Red card	(yellow card) (yellow-red card)	Yellow card	Red card	(yellow card) (yellow-red card)
2	(France)	DF	Kévin Théophile-Catherine	2	0	0	0	0	0	0	0	0	2	0	0	4	0	0
3	(France)	DF	Pierre-Yves Polomat	2	0	0	0	0	0	0	0	0	0	0	0	2	0	0
4	(Morocco)	FW	Oussama Tannane	1	0	0	0	0	0	0	0	0	2	0	0	3	0	0
5	(France)	MF	Vincent Pajot	5	0	0	1	0	0	0	0	0	3	0	0	9	0	0
6	(France)	MF	Jérémy Clément	5	0	0	0	0	0	0	0	0	1	0	0	6	0	0
7	(France)	FW	Jean-Christophe Bahebeck	2	0	0	0	0	0	0	0	0	0	0	0	2	0	0
9	(France)	MF	Nolan Roux	1	0	0	1	0	0	0	0	0	0	0	0	2	0	0
10	(France)	MF	Renaud Cohade	2	0	0	1	0	0	0	0	0	0	0	0	3	0	0
11	(France)	MF	Valentin Eysseric	4	0	0	0	0	0	0	0	0	1	0	1	5	0	1
13	(France)	MF	Franck Tabanou	0	0	0	0	0	0	0	0	0	1	0	0	1	0	0
14	(France)	MF	Neal Maupay	3	0	0	0	0	0	0	0	0	1	0	0	4	0	0
16	(France)	GK	Stéphane Ruffier	3	0	0	0	0	0	0	0	0	1	0	0	4	0	0
18	(France)	MF	Fabien Lemoine	8	0	0	0	0	0	0	0	0	0	0	0	8	0	0
19	(Guinea)	DF	Florentin Pogba	1	0	0	0	0	0	0	0	0	1	0	0	2	0	0
20	(France)	DF	Jonathan Brison	2	0	0	1	0	0	0	0	0	2	0	0	4	0	0
21	(France)	MF	Romain Hamouma	3	0	0	0	0	0	0	0	0	1	1	0	4	1	0
22	(France)	FW	Kevin Monnet-Paquet	2	0	0	0	0	0	0	0	0	0	0	0	2	0	0
25	(France)	DF	Kévin Malcuit	1	0	1	2	0	0	0	0	0	0	0	0	3	0	1
23	(Norway)	FW	Alexander Søderlund	1	0	0	0	0	0	0	0	0	0	0	0	1	0	0
24	(France)	DF	Loïc Perrin	0	0	0	0	0	0	0	0	0	1	0	0	1	0	0
26	(Senegal)	DF	Moustapha Bayal Sall	6	0	1	0	0	0	0	0	0	2	0	1	8	0	2
27	(Slovenia)	FW	Robert Berić	1	0	0	0	0	0	0	0	0	0	0	0	1	0	0
28	(Ivory Coast)	MF	Ismaël Diomande	1	0	0	0	0	0	0	0	0	1	0	0	2	0	0
32	(Cameroon)	DF	Benoît Assou-Ekotto	1	0	0	0	0	0	0	0	0	1	0	0	2	0	0
33	(France)	DF	Ronaël Pierre-Gabriel	0	0	0	0	0	0	1	0	0	0	0	0	1	0	0
34	(France)	MF	Nathan Dekoke	0	0	0	1	0	0	0	0	0	0	0	0	1	0	0
—	(France)	FW	Yohan Mollo	0	0	0	0	0	0	0	0	0	1	0	0	1	0	0
			TOTALS	53	0	2	6	0	0	1	0	0	22	1	2	80	1	4
