= 2014–15 AS Saint-Étienne season =

Saint-Étienne
2014–15 season
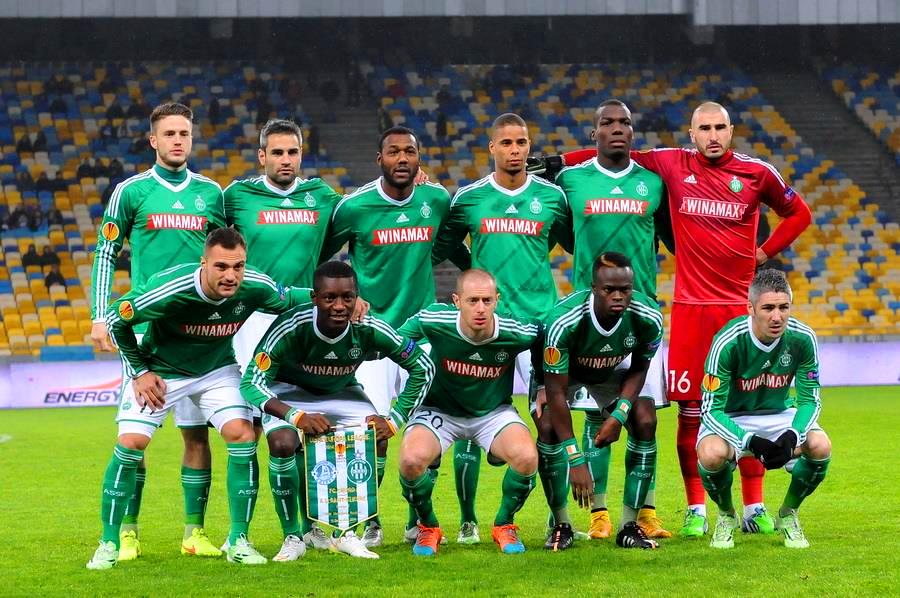
- Saint-Etienne players lining up before a UEFA Europa League match against FC Dnipro in December 2014
- Chairman: Bernard Caiazzo; Roland Romeyer
- Manager: Christophe Galtier
- Stadium: Stade Geoffroy-Guichard
- Ligue 1: 5th
- Coupe de France: Semi-finals
- Coupe de la Ligue: Quarter-finals
- UEFA Europa League: Group stage
- Top goalscorer: League: Max Gradel (17); All: Max Gradel (17)
- Highest home attendance: 39,147 vs Guingamp (23 May 2015)
- Lowest home attendance: 18,146 vs Nancy (4 January 2015)
Home colours	Away colours

The 2014–15 AS Saint-Étienne season was the 82nd professional season of the club since its creation in 1933.

== Players ==
=== First team squad ===
French teams are limited to four players without EU citizenship. Hence, the squad list includes only the principal nationality of each player; several non-European players on the squad have dual citizenship with an EU country. Also, players from the ACP countries—countries in Africa, the Caribbean, and the Pacific that are signatories to the Cotonou Agreement—are not counted against non-EU quotas due to the Kolpak ruling.

Note: Flags indicate national team as defined under FIFA eligibility rules; some limited exceptions apply. Players may hold more than one non-FIFA nationality.

No.	Pos.	Nation	Player
1	GK	FRA	Baptiste Valette
2	DF	FRA	Kevin Theophile-Catherine (on loan from Cardiff City)
6	MF	FRA	Jérémy Clément
7	FW	CIV	Max Gradel
8	MF	FRA	Benjamin Corgnet
9	FW	TUR	Mevlüt Erdinç
10	MF	FRA	Renaud Cohade
11	MF	FRA	Yohan Mollo
12	FW	FRA	Allan Saint-Maximin
13	FW	NED	Ricky van Wolfswinkel (on loan from Norwich)
16	GK	FRA	Stéphane Ruffier
18	MF	FRA	Fabien Lemoine

No.	Pos.	Nation	Player
19	DF	GUI	Florentin Pogba
20	DF	FRA	Jonathan Brison
21	MF	FRA	Romain Hamouma
22	FW	FRA	Kevin Monnet-Paquet
23	DF	FRA	Paul Baysse
24	DF	FRA	Loïc Perrin (captain)
26	DF	SEN	Moustapha Bayal Sall
27	DF	FRA	Franck Tabanou
28	MF	CIV	Ismaël Diomande
29	DF	FRA	François Clerc
30	GK	FRA	Jessy Moulin

== Competitions ==
=== Ligue 1 ===
==== League table ====
Pos	Team	Pld	W	D	L	GF	GA	GD	Pts	Qualification or relegation
3	Monaco	38	20	11	7	51	26	+25	71	Qualification for the Champions League third qualifying round
4	Marseille	38	21	6	11	76	42	+34	69	Qualification for the Europa League group stage
5	Saint-Étienne	38	19	12	7	51	30	+21	69	Qualification for the Europa League third qualifying round (Note: Since winners of the 2014–15 Coupe de la Ligue, Paris Saint-Germain, qualified for European competition based on their league position, the spot awarded to the Coupe de la Ligue winner (Europa League third qualifying round) is passed to the next best team in the table not already qualified for any European competition (in this case, the fifth-placed team).)
6	Bordeaux	38	17	12	9	47	44	+3	63	Qualification for the Europa League third qualifying round
7	Montpellier	38	16	8	14	46	39	+7	56	

Source: Ligue 1
Rules for classification: 1) points; 2) goal difference; 3) number of goals scored

==== Results summary ====
Overall								Home						Away					
Pld	W	D	L	GF	GA	GD	Pts	W	D	L	GF	GA	GD	W	D	L	GF	GA	GD
38	19	12	7	51	30	+21	69	12	5	2	32	11	+21	7	7	5	19	19	0

Last updated: 23 May 2015.
Source: Competitive matches

==== Results by round ====
Round	1	2	3	4	5	6	7	8	9	10	11	12	13	14	15	16	17	18	19	20	21	22	23	24	25	26	27	28	29	30	31	32	33	34	35	36	37	38
Ground	A	H	H	A	H	A	H	A	H	A	H	A	H	A	H	A	H	A	H	A	A	H	A	H	A	H	A	H	A	H	A	H	A	H	A	H	A	H
Result	W	W	D	L	W	W	D	L	L	W	W	D	D	D	W	W	W	D	W	W	D	L	L	D	L	D	D	W	W	W	D	W	D	W	L	W	W	W
Position	3	2	2	8	4	3	3	6	10	5	4	5	6	6	5	4	4	4	4	3	4	4	4	4	4	5	5	5	5	5	5	5	5	4	5	5	5	5

Source: Ligue1
A = Away; H = Home; W = Win; D = Draw; L = Loss

==== Matches ====
Win Draw Loss

9 August 2014 1	Guingamp	0–2	Saint-Étienne	Guingamp
21:00 CEST (UTC+02:00)		Report	Erdinç 39' (pen.), 90+2'; Lemoine (yellow card) 55'; Cohade (yellow card) 74'; Gradel (yellow card) 82'; Brison (yellow card) 84'	Stadium: Stade du Roudourou; Attendance: 16,852; Referee: Mikael Lesage

17 August 2014 2	Saint-Étienne	3–1	Reims	Saint-Étienne
17:00 CEST (UTC+02:00)	Gradel 60'; Bayal Sall (yellow card) 65'; Monnet-Paquet 70'; Erdinç 81'; Brison (yellow card) 83'	Report	Perrin 27' (o.g.); Devaux (yellow card) 35'; Bourillon (yellow card) 59'	Stadium: Stade Geoffroy-Guichard; Attendance: 33,810; Referee: Antony Gautier

24 August 2014 3	Saint-Étienne	0–0	Rennes	Saint-Étienne
17:00 CEST (UTC+02:00)	Corgnet (yellow card) 45+2'; Bayal Sall (yellow card) 88'	Report	Fernandes (yellow card) 30'; M'Bengue (yellow card) 51'; Armand (yellow card) 71'	Stadium: Stade Geoffroy-Guichard; Attendance: 30,967; Referee: Ruddy Buquet

31 August 2014 4	Paris Saint-Germain	5–0	Saint-Étienne	Paris
21:00 CEST (UTC+02:00)	Ruffier 24' (o.g.); Ibrahimović 41', 62', 72'; Cavani 63'	Report	Diomande (yellow card) 88'	Stadium: Parc des Princes; Attendance: 46,088; Referee: Clément Turpin

13 September 2014 5	Saint-Étienne	1–0	Caen	Saint-Étienne
20:00 CEST (UTC+02:00)	Pierre 74' (o.g.)	Report	Seube (yellow card) 60'	Stadium: Stade Geoffroy-Guichard; Attendance: 26,293; Referee: Sébastien Moreira

21 September 2014 6	Lens	0–1	Saint-Étienne	Amiens
17:00 CEST (UTC+02:00)	Coulibaly (yellow card) 33'; Lemoigne (yellow card) 71'	Report	Mollo (yellow card) 21'; Gradel (yellow card) 78'; Lemoine 82'	Stadium: Stade de la Licorne; Attendance: 11,072; Referee: Saïd Ennjimi

25 September 2014 7	Saint-Étienne	1–1	Bordeaux	Saint-Étienne
21:00 CEST (UTC+02:00)	van Wolfswinkel 31'; Clément (yellow card) 47'	Report	Ilori 39'; Traoré (yellow card) 42'; Sala (yellow card) 79'; Touré (yellow card) 90+1'	Stadium: Stade Geoffroy-Guichard; Attendance: 25,510; Referee: Lionel Jaffredo

28 September 2014 8	Marseille	2–1	Saint-Étienne	Marseille
21:00 CEST (UTC+02:00)	Imbula 7'; Payet 28'; N'Koulou (yellow card) 85'	Report	Mollo (yellow card) 51'; Brison 53'; Diomande (yellow card) 79'	Stadium: Stade Vélodrome; Attendance: 55,367; Referee: Fredy Fautrel

5 October 2014 9	Saint-Étienne	0–1	Toulouse	Saint-Étienne
14:00 CEST (UTC+02:00)	Lemoine (yellow card) 40'	Report	Ben Yedder 22'; Ninkov (yellow card) 55'	Stadium: Stade Geoffroy-Guichard; Attendance: 27,581; Referee: Philippe Kalt

18 October 2014 10	Lorient	0–1	Saint-Étienne	Lorient
17:00 CEST (UTC+02:00)	Bellugou (yellow card) 22'; Mostefa (yellow card) 49'	Report	Theophile-Catherine (yellow card) 41'; Hamouma (yellow card) 53'; Lemoine 86'	Stadium: Stade du Moustoir; Attendance: 14,069; Referee: Ruddy Buquet

26 October 2014 11	Saint-Étienne	1–0	Metz	Saint-Étienne
17:00 CEST (UTC+02:00)	Cohade (yellow card) 49'; Gradel 74'	Report	Bussmann (yellow card) 17'; N'Daw (yellow card) 43'	Stadium: Stade Geoffroy-Guichard; Attendance: 33,991; Referee: Sébastien Moreira

1 November 2014 12	Lille	1–1	Saint-Étienne	Lille
20:00 CET (UTC+01:00)	Frey 16', (yellow card) 83'; Souaré (yellow card) 76'	Report	Bayal Sall (yellow card) 36'; Diomande (yellow card) 42'; Gradel 60'	Stadium: Stade Pierre-Mauroy; Attendance: 36,170; Referee: Benoît Bastien

9 November 2014 13	Saint-Étienne	1–1	Monaco	Saint-Étienne
17:00 CET (UTC+01:00)	Tabanou (yellow card) 28'; Bayal Sall (yellow card) 42' van Wolfswinkel 58'	Report	Traoré 17'; Bakayoko (yellow card) 34' (yellow-red card) 72'; Raggi (yellow card) 42'; Carvalho (yellow card) 44'	Stadium: Stade Geoffroy-Guichard; Attendance: 29,403; Referee: Stéphane Lannoy

23 November 2014 14	Nantes	0–0	Saint-Étienne	Nantes
14:00 CET (UTC+01:00)	Shechter (yellow card) 32'; Vizcarrondo (yellow card) 53'	Report	Bayal Sall (yellow card) 4'; Tabanou (yellow card) 13'; Lemoine (yellow card) 58'	Stadium: Stade de la Beaujoire; Attendance: 32,324; Referee: Saïd Ennjimi

30 November 2014 15	Saint-Étienne	3–0	Lyon	Saint-Étienne
21:00 CET (UTC+01:00)	Bayal Sall 18' van Wolfswinkel 40'; Cohade 68'; Diomande (yellow card) 85'	Report		Stadium: Stade Geoffroy-Guichard; Attendance: 36,004; Referee: Clément Turpin

3 December 2014 16	Montpellier	0–2	Saint-Étienne	Montpellier
19:00 CET (UTC+01:00)	Marveaux (yellow card) 29'; Deplagne (yellow card) 63'	Report	Pogba 22'; Diomande (yellow card) 27' (yellow-red card) 78'; Baysse 43'	Stadium: Stade de la Mosson; Attendance: 10,425; Referee: Olivier Thual

6 December 2014 17	Saint-Étienne	1–0	Bastia	Saint-Étienne
20:00 CET (UTC+01:00)	van Wolfswinkel 58'; Bayal Sall (yellow card) 71'	Report	Gillet (yellow card) 46'	Stadium: Stade Geoffroy-Guichard; Attendance: 28,686; Referee: Nicolas Rainville

14 December 2014 18	Nice	0–0	Saint-Étienne	Nice
14:00 CET (UTC+01:00)	Carlos Eduardo (red card) 38'; Bauthéac (yellow card) 75'	Report	Diomande (yellow card) 29' (yellow-red card) 37'; Hamouma (yellow card) 34'	Stadium: Allianz Riviera; Attendance: 18,493; Referee: Lionel Jaffredo

21 December 2014 19	Saint-Étienne	3–0	Evian	Saint-Étienne
17:00 CET (UTC+01:00)	Gradel 2' van Wolfswinkel 20'; Brison (yellow card) 62'; Hamouma 65'	Report		Stadium: Stade Geoffroy-Guichard; Attendance: 33,017; Referee: Amaury Delerue

10 January 2015 20	Reims	1–2	Saint-Étienne	Reims
20:00 CET (UTC+01:00)	Conte (yellow card) 20' (yellow-red card) 90'; Roberge (yellow card) 43'; Charbonnier (yellow card) 58'; Diego 90'	Report	Corgnet (yellow card) 32'; Mollo 44'; Hamouma 50'	Stadium: Stade Auguste Delaune; Attendance: 15,013; Referee: Sébastien Moreira

18 January 2015 21	Rennes	0–0	Saint-Étienne	Rennes
17:00 CET (UTC+01:00)	Fernandes (yellow card) 28'	Report	Mollo (yellow card) 30'	Stadium: Stade de la Route de Lorient; Attendance: 17,555; Referee: Stéphane Lannoy

25 January 2015 22	Saint-Étienne	0–1	Paris Saint-Germain	Saint-Étienne
21:00 CET (UTC+01:00)	van Wolfswinkel (yellow card) 20'; Tabanou (yellow card) 28'	Report	Ibrahimović 61', (yellow card) 90+3'; Lucas (yellow card) 72'; Motta (yellow card) 89'	Stadium: Stade Geoffroy-Guichard; Attendance: 32,302; Referee: Ruddy Buquet

1 February 2015 23	Caen	1–0	Saint-Étienne	Caen
14:00 CET (UTC+01:00)	Féret 41'; Da Silva (yellow card) 42'; Nangis (yellow card) 63'	Report	Clément (yellow card) 83'; Lemoine (yellow card) 87'	Stadium: Stade Michel d'Ornano; Attendance: 19,432; Referee: Bartolomeu Varela

6 February 2015 24	Saint-Étienne	3–3	Lens	Saint-Étienne
20:30 CET (UTC+01:00)	N'Guémo 18'; Baysse (yellow card) 27'; Mollo 57'; Hamouma (yellow card) 71'; Erdinç 83'; Lemoine (yellow card) 88'	Summary	Touzghar 60', 69' (pen.); Kantari (yellow card) 72'; Chavarría 77'; Valdivia (yellow card) 88'	Stadium: Stade Geoffroy-Guichard; Attendance: 31,974; Referee: Olivier Thual

15 February 2015 25	Bordeaux	1–0	Saint-Étienne	Bordeaux
14:00 CET (UTC+01:00)	Rolán 42'	Report	Gradel (yellow card) 90'; Lemoine (yellow card) 90+2'	Stadium: Stade Chaban-Delmas; Attendance: 27,661; Referee: Antony Gautier

22 February 2015 26	Saint-Étienne	2–2	Marseille	Saint-Étienne
21:00 CET (UTC+01:00)	Gradel 54' (pen.); Erdinç 90+1'; Mollo (yellow card) 90+2'	Report	Dja Djédjé (yellow card) 51'; Ocampos (yellow card) 59'; Batshuayi 64', 67'; Aloé (yellow card) 65'; Fanni (yellow card) 81'	Stadium: Stade Geoffroy-Guichard; Attendance: 35,651; Referee: Clément Turpin

28 February 2015 27	Toulouse	1–1	Saint-Étienne	Toulouse
20:00 CET (UTC+01:00)	Spajić (yellow card) 44'; Grigore (yellow card) 68'; Akpa Akpro 88'	Report	Gradel 45' (pen.); Hamouma (yellow card) 80'	Stadium: Stadium Municipal; Attendance: 14,579; Referee: Frank Schneider

8 March 2015 28	Saint-Étienne	2–0	Lorient	Saint-Étienne
14:00 CET (UTC+01:00)	Gradel (yellow card) 55', (goal) 90'; Mollo 74'; Clément (yellow card) 85'; Karamoko (yellow card) 87'	Report	N'Dong (yellow card) 59' (yellow-red card) 67'	Stadium: Stade Geoffroy-Guichard; Attendance: 30,921; Referee: Mickaël Lesage

14 March 2015 29	Metz	2–3	Saint-Étienne	Metz
17:00 CET (UTC+01:00)	Métanire (yellow card) 52'; Lejeune 56'; Ngbakoto 90+1'; Marchal (yellow card) 90+2'	Report	Gradel 38'; Erdinç 42'; Mollo 80'	Stadium: Stade Municipal Saint-Symphorien; Attendance: 16,721; Referee: Nicolas Rainville

22 March 2015 30	Saint-Étienne	2–0	Lille	Saint-Étienne
14:00 CET (UTC+01:00)	Gradel (yellow card) 19', (goal) 63', 74'; Clément (yellow card) 56'; Tabanou (yellow card) 71'	Report	Balmont (yellow card) 28'; Lopes (red card) 52'	Stadium: Stade Geoffroy-Guichard; Attendance: 32,185; Referee: Saïd Ennjimi

3 April 2015 31	Monaco	1–1	Saint-Étienne	Monaco
20:30 CEST (UTC+02:00)	Moutinho (yellow card) 64'; Martial 68'; Raggi (yellow card) 83'; Fabinho (yellow card) 90+2'	Report	Erdinç 62'; Tabanou (yellow card) 70'	Stadium: Stade Louis II; Attendance: 8,894; Referee: Lionel Jaffredo

12 April 2015 32	Saint-Étienne	1–0	Nantes	Saint-Étienne
14:00 CEST (UTC+02:00)	Tabanou 18'; Theophile-Catherine (yellow card) 44'; Lemoine (yellow card) 70'; Ruffier (yellow card) 71'; Perrin (yellow card) 78'	Report	Bedoya (yellow card) 68'; Djilobodji (yellow card) 86'	Stadium: Stade Geoffroy-Guichard; Attendance: 37,417; Referee: Clément Turpin

18 April 2015 33	Lyon	2–2	Saint-Étienne	Lyon
21:00 CEST (UTC+02:00)	Tolisso (yellow card) 3'; N'Jie 24'; Rose (red card) 29'; Jallet 48'; Lopes (yellow card) 53'	Report	Erding (yellow card) 9'; Gradel 31' (pen.), (yellow card) 53'; Hamouma 45'; Clement (yellow card) 62'; Tabanou (yellow card) 66'; Corgnet (yellow card) 80'	Stadium: Stade de Gerland; Attendance: 37,715; Referee: Said Ennjimi

25 April 2015 34	Saint-Étienne	1–0	Montpellier	Saint-Étienne
14:00 CEST (UTC+02:00)	Gradel 20'; Clement (yellow card) 31'	Report	Congré (yellow card) 49'; Dabo (yellow card) 67'	Stadium: Stade Geoffroy-Guichard; Attendance: 35,231; Referee: Benoit Bastien

2 May 2015 35	Bastia	1–0	Saint-Étienne	Bastia
20:00 CEST (UTC+02:00)	Diakité (yellow card) 35'; Danic (yellow card) 58'; Palmieri (yellow card) 82'; Ayité 84'; Cioni (yellow card) 87'	Report	Hamouma (yellow card) 82'; Van Wolfswinkel (yellow card) 90+3'	Stadium: Stade Armand Cesari; Attendance: 14,944; Referee: Stéphane Lannoy

10 May 2015 36	Saint-Étienne	5–0	Nice	Saint-Étienne
17:00 CEST (UTC+02:00)	Clément (yellow card) 9', (goal) 40'; Sall (yellow card) 11'; Perrin 25'; Erdinç 62'; Gradel 84'; Monnet-Paquet 88'	Report	Bauthéac (yellow card) 12'; Amavi (yellow card) 39'	Stadium: Stade Geoffroy-Guichard; Attendance: 32,770; Referee: Bartolomeu Varela

16 May 2015 37	Evian	1–2	Saint-Étienne	Annecy
21:00 CEST (UTC+02:00)	Juelsgård (yellow card) 35'; Sorlin (yellow card) 41'; Duhamel 42'; Mongongu (yellow card) 76'; Cambon (yellow card) 81'; Abdallah (yellow card) 88' (red card) 90'	Report	Gradel 12', 82'; Brison (yellow card) 25'	Stadium: Parc des Sports; Attendance: 14,382; Referee: Ruddy Buquet

23 May 2015 38	Saint-Étienne	2–1	Guingamp	Saint-Étienne
21:00 CEST (UTC+02:00)	Gradel 36', 49'; Brison (yellow card) 44'; Sall (yellow card) 61'	Report	Jacobsen (yellow card) 51'; Beauvue 61' (pen.)	Stadium: Stade Geoffroy-Guichard; Attendance: 39,147; Referee: Fredy Fautrel

=== Coupe de la Ligue ===
17 December 2014 Round of 16	Lorient	0–1	Saint-Étienne	Lorient
18:40 CET (UTC+01:00)		Report	Hamouma 48'; Theophile-Catherine (yellow card) 85'	Stadium: Stade du Moustoir; Attendance: 9,015; Referee: Benoît Bastien

13 January 2015 Quarter-finals	Saint-Étienne	0–1	Paris Saint-Germain	Saint-Étienne
21:00 CET (UTC+01:00)	Lemoine (yellow card) 44'; Corgnet (yellow card) 57'; Ruffier (yellow card) 73'; Tabanou (yellow card) 85'	Report	Ibrahimović (yellow card) 38', (goal) 72'; Motta (yellow card) 81'; Matuidi (yellow card) 84'; Lucas (yellow card) 86'	Stadium: Stade Geoffroy-Guichard; Attendance: 28,855; Referee: Saïd Ennjimi

=== Coupe de France ===
4 January 2015 Round of 32	Saint-Étienne	1–0 (a.e.t.)	Nancy	Saint-Étienne
13:15 CET (UTC+01:00)	Clément (yellow card) 74'; Tabanou 97'	Report	Muratori (yellow card) 11'; Cuffaut (yellow card) 34'; Sami (yellow card) 78'	Stadium: Stade Geoffroy-Guichard; Attendance: 18,146; Referee: Clément Turpin

21 January 2015 Round of 32	Tours	3–5 (a.e.t.)	Saint-Étienne	Tours
18:00 CET (UTC+01:00)	Bayal Sall 11' (o.g.); Kouakou (yellow card) 18' (yellow-red card) 103'; Touré (yellow card) 62'; Adnane 75'; Bergougnoux 80' (pen.), (yellow card) 117'	Report	Monnet-Paquet 64', 118' van Wolfswinkel 71', 73'; Lemoine (yellow card) 88'; Erdinç 105'; Brison (yellow card) 107'	Stadium: Stade de la Vallée du Cher; Attendance: 16,033; Referee: Nicolas Rainville

10 February 2015 Round of 16	Red Star	1–2	Saint-Étienne	Paris
20:00 CET (UTC+01:00)	Ielsch (red card) 25'; Bouazza 28'	Report	van Wolfswinkel 18'; Cros 80' (o.g.)	Stadium: Stade Jean-Bouin; Attendance: 12,919; Referee: (France) Philippe Kalt

4 March 2015 Quarter-finals	Boulogne	1–1 (a.e.t.) (3–4 p)	Saint-Étienne	Boulogne-sur-Mer
13:45 CET (UTC+01:00)	Soubervie (yellow card) 53', (goal) 80' (pen.); Rolland (yellow card) 96'	Report	Bayal Sall (yellow card) 50'; Corgnet 85'; Mollo (yellow card) 90+1'	Stadium: Stade de la Libération; Referee: Fredy Fautrel
	Penalties
	Soubervie (penalty scored); Rolland (penalty scored); Jacques (penalty scored); Dia (penalty missed); Mercier (penalty missed)		Mollo (penalty scored); Perrin (penalty missed); Erdinç (penalty scored); Monnet-Paquet (penalty scored); Clerc (penalty scored)

7 April 2015 Semi-finals	Paris Saint-Germain	4–1	Saint-Étienne	Paris
21:00 CEST (UTC+02:00)	Verratti (yellow card) 19'; Ibrahimović 21', 81', 90+2'; Lavezzi 60', (yellow card) 60'	Report	Lemoine (yellow card) 11'; Hamouma 25'	Stadium: Parc des Princes

=== UEFA Europa League ===
==== Play-off Round ====
21 August 2014 1st Leg	Karabükspor (Turkey)	1–0	(France) Saint-Étienne	Karabük, Turkey
19:00	Kumbela 60'; Waterman (yellow card) 87'; Özgenç (yellow card) 90+1'	Report	Brison (yellow card) 50'; Clément (yellow card) 64'; Erdinç (yellow card) 90+1'	Stadium: Dr. Necmettin Şeyhoğlu Stadı; Attendance: 6,336; Referee: Marcin Borski (Poland)

28 August 2014 2nd Leg	Saint-Étienne (France)	1–0 (a.e.t.) (1–1 agg.) (4–3 p)	(Turkey) Karabükspor	Saint-Étienne, France
20:30	Monnet-Paquet 13'; Lemoine (yellow card) 89'	Report	Kumbela (yellow card) 5'; Özek (yellow card) 56'; Özgenç (yellow card) 88'; Mabiala (yellow card) 95'	Stadium: Stade Geoffroy-Guichard; Attendance: 27,280; Referee: Yevhen Aranovskiy (Ukraine)
	Penalties
	Cohade (penalty scored); Pogba (penalty scored); Monnet-Paquet (penalty scored); Clément (penalty missed); Gradel (penalty scored)		Özgenç (penalty scored); Özmert (penalty scored); Mabiala (penalty scored); Akgün (penalty missed); Özek (penalty missed)

==== Group stage ====
Pos	Team	Pld	W	D	L	GF	GA	GD	Pts	Qualification	INT	DNI	QAR	SET
1	(Italy) Internazionale	6	3	3	0	6	2	+4	12	Advance to knockout phase	—	2–1	2–0	0–0
2	(Ukraine) Dnipro Dnipropetrovsk	6	2	1	3	4	5	−1	7	Advance to knockout phase	0–1	—	0–1	1–0
3	(Azerbaijan) Qarabağ	6	1	3	2	3	5	−2	6		0–0	1–2	—	0–0
4	(France) Saint-Étienne	6	0	5	1	2	3	−1	5		1–1	0–0	1–1	—

Source: Soccerway
Rules for classification: Group stage tiebreakers

18 September 2014 1	Qarabağ (Azerbaijan)	0–0	(France) Saint-Étienne	Baku, Azerbaijan
18:00		Report	Clément (yellow card) 64'; Gradel (yellow card) 67'	Stadium: Tofiq Bahramov Republican Stadium; Attendance: 28,786; Referee: Steven McLean (Scotland)

2 October 2014 2	Saint-Étienne (France)	0–0	(Ukraine) Dnipro Dnipropetrovsk	Saint-Étienne, France
21:05	Perrin (yellow card) 27'; Bayal Sall (yellow card) 71'	Report	Zozulya (yellow card) 33'; Fedetskyi (yellow card) 52'; Mazuch (yellow card) 70'; Shakhov (yellow card) 81'; Douglas (yellow card) 89'	Stadium: Stade Geoffroy-Guichard; Attendance: 28,207; Referee: Alexandru Tudor (Romania)

23 October 2014 3	Internazionale (Italy)	0–0	(France) Saint-Étienne	Milan, Italy
21:05	Juan (yellow card) 80'; Hernanes (yellow card) 89'	Report	Bayal Sall (yellow card) 42'	Stadium: San Siro; Attendance: 30,000; Referee: Anthony Taylor (England)

6 November 2014 4	Saint-Étienne (France)	1–1	(Italy) Internazionale	Saint-Étienne, France
19:00	Bayal Sall 50'; Tabanou (yellow card) 53'	Report	Dodô 33'	Stadium: Stade Geoffroy-Guichard; Attendance: 36,411; Referee: Slavko Vinčić (Slovenia)

27 November 2014 5	Saint-Étienne (France)	1–1	(Azerbaijan) Qarabağ	Saint-Étienne, France
21:05	Van Wolfswinkel 21'; Lemoine (yellow card) 90+3'	Report	Nadirov 15'; George (yellow card) 48'; Medvedev (yellow card) 74'	Stadium: Stade Geoffroy-Guichard; Attendance: 29,769; Referee: Kristinn Jakobsson (Iceland)

11 December 2014 6	Dnipro Dnipropetrovsk (Ukraine)	1–0	(France) Saint-Étienne	Kyiv, Ukraine
18:00	Zozulya (yellow card) 48'; Fedetskyi (yellow card) 53', (goal) 66'; Douglas (yellow card) 55'; Kalinić (yellow card) 90+4'	Report	Perrin (yellow card) 36' van Wolfswinkel (yellow card) 38'; Monnet-Paquet (yellow card) 65'	Stadium: Olympic Stadium; Attendance: 2,579; Referee: Marijo Strahonja (Croatia)

== Statistics ==
=== Appearances and goals ===
No.	Pos	Nat	Player	Total		Ligue 1		Coupe de France		Coupe de la Ligue		UEFA Europa League	
No.	Pos	Nat	Player	Apps	Goals	Apps	Goals	Apps	Goals	Apps	Goals	Apps	Goals
Goalkeepers
1	GK	(France) FRA	Baptiste Valette	0	0	0	0	0	0	0	0	0	0
16	GK	(France) FRA	Stéphane Ruffier	46	0	38	0	0	0	0	0	8	0
30	GK	(France) FRA	Jessy Moulin	0	0	0	0	0	0	0	0	0	0
Defenders
2	DF	(France) FRA	Kévin Théophile-Catherine	36	0	30+1	0	0	0	0	0	5	0
19	DF	(Guinea) GUI	Florentin Pogba	22	1	12+4	1	0	0	0	0	4+2	0
20	DF	(France) FRA	Jonathan Brison	22	1	9+9	1	0	0	0	0	4	0
23	DF	(France) FRA	Paul Baysse	11	1	8+1	1	0	0	0	0	1+1	0
24	DF	(France) FRA	Loïc Perrin	35	1	27+1	1	0	0	0	0	7	0
26	DF	(Senegal) SEN	Moustapha Bayal Sall	30	2	23	1	0	0	0	0	7	1
27	DF	(France) FRA	Franck Tabanou	37	1	30+1	1	0	0	0	0	5+1	0
29	DF	(France) FRA	François Clerc	16	0	15	0	0	0	0	0	1	0
32	DF	(France) FRA	Benjamin Karamoko	2	0	1+1	0	0	0	0	0	0	0
Midfielders
6	MF	(France) FRA	Jérémy Clément	36	1	28+1	1	0	0	0	0	7	0
8	MF	(France) FRA	Benjamin Corgnet	28	0	15+10	0	0	0	0	0	1+2	0
10	MF	(France) FRA	Renaud Cohade	24	1	11+6	1	0	0	0	0	4+3	0
11	MF	(France) FRA	Yohan Mollo	25	4	12+11	4	0	0	0	0	1+1	0
14	MF	(Cameroon) CMR	Landry N'Guémo	14	1	11+3	1	0	0	0	0	0	0
18	MF	(France) FRA	Fabien Lemoine	43	2	31+4	2	0	0	0	0	7+1	0
21	MF	(France) FRA	Romain Hamouma	32	3	23+3	3	0	0	0	0	5+1	0
28	MF	(Ivory Coast) CIV	Ismaël Diomandé	24	0	12+8	0	0	0	0	0	2+2	0
33	MF	(France) FRA	Jonathan Bamba	3	0	0+3	0	0	0	0	0	0	0
Forwards
7	FW	(Ivory Coast) CIV	Max Gradel	38	17	23+8	17	0	0	0	0	7	0
9	FW	(Turkey) TUR	Mevlüt Erdinç	30	8	20+6	8	0	0	0	0	4	0
12	FW	(France) FRA	Allan Saint-Maximin	10	0	3+6	0	0	0	0	0	0+1	0
13	FW	(Netherlands) NED	Ricky van Wolfswinkel	34	6	18+10	5	0	0	0	0	4+2	1
22	FW	(France) FRA	Kévin Monnet-Paquet	37	3	18+12	2	0	0	0	0	4+3	1

Last updated: 30 May 2015
Source: BDFutbol
