= 2016–17 AS Saint-Étienne season =

AS Saint-Étienne
2016–17 season
- Manager: Christophe Galtier
- Stadium: Stade Geoffroy-Guichard
- Ligue 1: 8th
- Coupe de France: Round of 32
- Coupe de la Ligue: Round of 16
- UEFA Europa League: Round of 32
- Top goalscorer: League: Romain Hamouma (7); All: Robert Berić (9)
Home colours	Away colours	Third colours

The 2016–17 AS-Saint-Étienne season was the 84th professional season of the club since its creation in 1933.

== Players ==
=== Squad information ===
Players and squad numbers last updated on 20 August 2016.
Note: Flags indicate national team as has been defined under FIFA eligibility rules. Players may hold more than one non-FIFA nationality.

No.	Name	Nat.	Position(s)	Date of birth (age)	Signed in	Contract until	Signed from
Goalkeepers
1	Anthony Maisonnial	(France)	GK	23 March 1998 (age 28)	2015	2018	Youth academy
16	Stéphane Ruffier	(France)	GK	27 September 1986 (age 40)	2011	2018	(France) Monaco
30	Jessy Moulin	(France)	GK	13 January 1986 (age 40)	2005	2018	Youth academy
Defenders
2	Kévin Théophile-Catherine	(France)		28 October 1989 (age 37)	2015	2018	(Wales) Cardiff City
3	Pierre-Yves Polomat	(France)		27 December 1993 (age 32)	2012	2019	Youth academy
12	Cheikh M'Bengue	(Senegal)		23 July 1988 (age 38)	2016	2019	(France) Rennes
19	Florentin Pogba	(Guinea)		19 August 1990 (age 36)	2012	2018	(France) Sedan
24	Loïc Perrin	(France)	CB	7 August 1985 (age 41)	2003	2018	Youth academy
25	Kévin Malcuit	(France)	RB	31 July 1991 (age 35)	2015	2019	(France) Chamois Niortais
–	Benjamin Karamoko	(France)	DF	17 May 1995 (age 31)	2015		Youth academy
–	Ronaël Pierre-Gabriel	(France)	DF	13 June 1998 (age 28)	2015		Youth academy
Midfielders
5	Vincent Pajot	(France)	DM	19 August 1990 (age 36)	2015	2019	(France) Rennes
6	Jérémy Clément	(France)	DM	26 August 1984 (age 42)	2011	2018	(France) Paris Saint-Germain
7	Bryan Dabo	(France)	DM	18 February 1992 (age 34)	2016	2020	(France) Montpellier
8	Benjamin Corgnet	(France)	AM	6 April 1987 (age 39)	2013	2017	(France) Lorient
11	Henri Saivet	(Senegal)	AM	26 October 1990 (age 36)	2016	2017	(England) Newcastle United
14	Jordan Veretout	(France)	CM	1 March 1993 (age 33)	2016	2017	(England) Aston Villa
17	Ole Selnæs	(Norway)	CM / DM	7 July 1994 (age 32)	2016	2020	(Norway) Rosenborg
18	Fabien Lemoine	(France)	DM	16 March 1987 (age 39)	2011	2018	(France) Rennes
Forwards
9	Nolan Roux	(France)			2015	2018	(France) Lille
10	Oussama Tannane	(Morocco)			2016	2020	(Netherlands) Heracles Almelo
20	Yohan Mollo	(France)					
21	Romain Hamouma	(France)					
22	Kévin Monnet-Paquet	(France)					
23	Alexander Søderlund	(Norway)					
27	Robert Beric	(Slovenia)					
31	Dylan Saint-Louis	(France)					

== Transfers ==
=== In ===
Date	Pos.	Player	Age	Moving from	Fee	Notes	Source
24 June 2016	MF	Bryan Dabo	24	(France) Montpellier		Four-year contract	
20 July 2016	DF	Cheikh M'Bengue	27	(France) Rennes	Free	Three-year contract	
31 August 2016	DF	Léo Lacroix	24	(Switzerland) Sion		Four-year contract	

=== Loans in ===
Date	Pos.	Player	Age	Loaned from	Fee	Notes	Source
23 August 2016	MF	Henri Saivet	25	(England) Newcastle United			
23 August 2016	MF	Jordan Veretout	23	(England) Aston Villa			

=== Out ===
Date	Pos.	Player	Age	Moving to	Fee	Notes	Source
17 May 2016	MF	Ismaël Diomandé	23	(France) Caen		Three-year contract	
9 June 2016	DF	François Clerc	33	(France) Gazélec Ajaccio	Free	Two-year contract	
22 June 2016	DF	Jonathan Brison	33	(France) Chamois Niortais		Three-year contract	
25 July 2016	DF	Moustapha Sall	30	(Qatar) Al-Arabi			
16 August 2016	DF	Benoît Assou-Ekotto	32	(France) Metz	Free		
31 August 2016	FW	Yohan Mollo	27	(Russia) Krylia Sovetov			

== Pre-season and friendlies ==
2 July 2016 Friendly	Saint-Etienne	3–1	Clermont Foot	Andrézieux-Bouthéon, France
18:30	Roux 25'; Monnet-Paquet 28'; Corgnet 85'	Report		Stadium: L'Envol Stadium

9 July 2016 Friendly	Saint-Étienne	0–1	Tours	Vichy, France
		Report	Malfleury 38'	Stadium: Stade Louis Darragon; Attendance: 500; Referee: Said Ennjimi

13 July 2016 Friendly	Saint-Étienne	1–2	PSV Eindhoven	Thonon-les-Bains, France
	Dabo 31'	Report	Narsingh 22' de Jong 61'	Stadium: Stade Joseph-Moynat

16 July 2016 Friendly	Lausanne-Sport	4–1	Saint-Étienne	Lausanne, Switzerland
	Torres 8'; Margiotta 29'; Méndez 76'; Araz 81'	Report	Hamouma 75'	Stadium: Stade Olympique de la Pontaise

9 August 2016 Friendly	Saint-Étienne	0–1	Wolfsburg	Hartberg, Austria
		Report	Błaszczykowski 25'	Stadium: PROfertil ARENA

== Competitions ==
=== Overall ===
Competition	Started round	Current position	Final position	First match	Last match
Ligue 1	Matchday 1	—	—	12 August 2016	19 May 2017
Coupe de France	Round of 64				
Coupe de la Ligue	Round of 16				
Europa League	Third qualifying round	Round of 32	—	28 July 2016	—

=== Ligue 1 ===
==== League table ====
Pos	Team	Pld	W	D	L	GF	GA	GD	Pts	Qualification or relegation
6	Bordeaux	38	15	14	9	53	43	+10	59	Qualification for the Europa League third qualifying round (Note: Since the winners of the 2016–17 Coupe de France and the 2016–17 Coupe de la Ligue, Paris Saint-Germain, qualified for European competition based on league position, the spot awarded to the Coupe de France winners (Europa League group stage) was passed to the fourth-placed team and the spot awarded to the Coupe de la Ligue winners (Europa League third qualifying round) was passed to the sixth-placed team. The fifth-placed team received the spot in Europa League third qualifying round originally designated to the fourth-placed team.)
7	Nantes	38	14	9	15	40	54	−14	51	
8	Saint-Étienne	38	12	14	12	41	42	−1	50	
9	Rennes	38	12	14	12	36	42	−6	50	
10	Guingamp	38	14	8	16	46	53	−7	50	

Source: Ligue 1, Soccerway
Rules for classification: 1) Points; 2) Goal difference; 3) Goals scored; 4) Head-to-head goal difference; 5) Fairplay ranking.

==== Results summary ====
Overall								Home						Away					
Pld	W	D	L	GF	GA	GD	Pts	W	D	L	GF	GA	GD	W	D	L	GF	GA	GD
38	12	14	12	41	42	−1	50	7	9	3	24	18	+6	5	5	9	17	24	−7

Last updated: 20 May 2017.
Source: Competitive matches

==== Results by round ====
Round	1	2	3	4	5	6	7	8	9	10	11	12	13	14	15	16	17	18	19	20	21	22	23	24	25	26	27	28	29	30	31	32	33	34	35	36	37	38
Ground	A	H	H	A	H	A	H	A	H	A	H	A	H	A	H	A	H	A	H	A	H	A	H	A	H	A	H	A	H	A	A	H	A	H	A	H	H	A
Result	L	W	D	D	W	D	W	L	D	W	D	D	L	W	D	L	W	L	D	D	W	W	W	L	W	L	L	D	D	W	W	D	L	D	W	D	L	L
Position	13	8	10	12	8	10	7	9	9	7	7	7	9	9	9	9	8	8	8	8	6	5	5	5	5	5	7	7	7	7	7	7	7	7	7	7	8	8

Source: Competitive matches
A = Away; H = Home; W = Win; D = Draw; L = Loss

==== Matches ====
13 August 2016 1	Bordeaux	3–2	Saint-Étienne	Bordeaux
17:00	Laborde 13'; Rolan 57'; Malcom 72'; Touré (yellow card) 80'	Report	Tannane (yellow card) 40'; Perrin (yellow card) 71'; Hamouma 81'; Søderlund 89'	Stadium: Matmut Atlantique; Attendance: 34,212; Referee: Lionel Jaffredo

21 August 2016 2	Saint-Étienne	3–1	Montpellier	Saint-Étienne
17:00	Monnet-Paquet 47'; Saint-Louis 50'; Karamoko (yellow card) 56'; Beric 85'	Report	Mounie 23'; Ninga (yellow card) 80'	Stadium: Stade Geoffroy-Guichard; Attendance: 23,661; Referee: Ruddy Buquet

28 August 2016 3	Saint-Étienne	0–0	Toulouse	Saint-Étienne
17:00	Pierre-Gabriel (yellow card) 33'; Pajot (yellow card) 73'	Report	Blin (yellow card) 87'	Stadium: Stade Geoffroy-Guichard; Attendance: 23,786; Referee: Bartolomeu Varela

9 September 2016 4	Paris Saint-Germain	1–1	Saint-Étienne	Paris
	Verratti (yellow card) 25'; Lucas Moura 67' (pen.); Krychowiak (yellow card) 71'	Report	Selnæs (yellow card) 39'; Saivet (yellow card) 56'; Malcuit (yellow card) 66'; Pogba (yellow card) 69'; Berić 90+3'	Stadium: Parc des Princes; Attendance: 44,327; Referee: Benoît Bastien

18 September 2016 5	Saint-Étienne	1–0	Bastia	Saint-Étienne
17:00	Tannane (yellow card) 65'; Selnæs (yellow card) 83'; Hamouma 90+3' (pen.)	Report	Leca (yellow card) 6'; Cioni (yellow card) 29'; Nangis (yellow card) 76'; Crivelli (yellow card) 89'	Stadium: Stade Geoffroy-Guichard; Attendance: 22,245; Referee: François Letexier

21 September 2016 6	Nantes	0–0	Saint-Étienne	Nantes
19:00	Lucas Lima (yellow card) 25'; Kačaniklić (yellow card) 49'; Walongwa (yellow card) 55'; Vizcarrondo (yellow card) 78'	Report	Malcuit (red card) 16'	Stadium: Stade de la Beaujoire; Attendance: 18,823; Referee: Amaury Delerue

25 September 2016 7	Saint-Étienne	3–1	Lille	Saint-Étienne
15:00	Dabo (yellow card) 41'; Berić 63'; Nordin 72'; Lacroix (yellow card) 78'; Roux (yellow card) 85', (goal) 90+2'	Report	Béria (red card) 38'; Civelli 80', (yellow card) 84'	Stadium: Stade Geoffroy-Guichard; Attendance: 24,700; Referee: Benoît Millot

2 October 2016 8	Lyon	2–0	Saint-Étienne	Décines
20:45	Morel (yellow card) 40'; Darder 41'; Valbuena (yellow card) 56'; Ferri (yellow card) 67'; Ghezzal 89'	Report	Lacroix (yellow card) 33'	Stadium: Parc Olympique Lyonnais; Attendance: 57,050; Referee: Clément Turpin

16 October 2016 9	Saint-Étienne	1–1	Dijon	Saint-Étienne
17:00	Théophile-Catherine (yellow card) 82'; Roux 90+4' (pen.)	Report	Lees-Melou 22'; Bernard (yellow card) 79'	Stadium: Stade Geoffroy-Guichard; Referee: Karim Abed

23 October 2016 10	Caen	0–2	Saint-Étienne	Caen
15:00	Bessat (yellow card) 62'	Report	Saivet (yellow card) 28', (goal) 49'; Veretout 58'	Stadium: Stade Michel d'Ornano; Attendance: 18,509; Referee: Olivier Thual

29 October 2016 11	Saint-Étienne	1–1	Monaco	Saint-Étienne
20:00 CEST (UTC+2)	Perrin 18'	Report	Glik 5', (yellow card) 58'; Mendy (yellow card) 49'; Fabinho (yellow card) 53'; Jemerson (yellow card) 82'	Stadium: Stade Geoffroy-Guichard; Attendance: 35,890; Referee: Ruddy Buquet

6 November 2016 12	Metz	0–0	Saint-Étienne	Metz
17:00 CEST (UTC+2)		Report		Stadium: Stade Saint-Symphorien; Attendance: 16,204; Referee: Bartolomeu Varela

20 November 2016 13	Saint-Étienne	0–1	Nice	Saint-Étienne
21:00 CEST (UTC+2)		Report	Eysseric 63'	Stadium: Stade Geoffroy-Guichard; Attendance: 30,004; Referee: Frank Schneider

27 November 2016 14	Angers	1–2	Saint-Étienne	Angers
15:00 CEST (UTC+2)	Pepe 18'	Report	Pogba 59'; Tannane 78'	Stadium: Stade Jean Bouin; Attendance: 13,293; Referee: Johan Hamel

30 November 2016 15	Saint-Étienne	0–0	Marseille	Saint-Étienne
19:00 CEST (UTC+2)		Report		Stadium: Stade Geoffroy-Guichard; Referee: Benoît Bastien

4 December 2016 16	Rennes	2–0	Saint-Étienne	Rennes
15:00 CEST (UTC+2)	Fernandes (yellow card) 51'; Ntep 54'; André (yellow card) 65'; Sio (yellow card) 73'; Grosicki 90'	Report	Veretout (yellow card) 57'; Selnæs (yellow card) 83'	Stadium: Roazhon Park; Attendance: 19,618; Referee: Amaury Delerue

11 December 2016 17	Saint-Étienne	1–0	Guingamp	Saint-Étienne
17:00 CEST (UTC+2)	Hamouma 25'	Report	Marçal (yellow card) 40'; Diallo (yellow card) 72'	Stadium: Stade Geoffroy-Guichard; Referee: Ruddy Buquet

17 December 2016 18	Lorient	2–1	Saint-Étienne	Lorient
20:00 CEST (UTC+2)	Philippoteaux (yellow card) 16', (goal) 39'; Lautoa (yellow card) 67'; Le Goff (yellow card) 73'; Ciani (yellow card) 75'; Cabot 90'	[ Report]	Moulin (red card) 10'; M'Bengue (yellow card) 47'; Pierre-Gabriel (yellow card) 80'; Pajot 90+1'	Stadium: Stade du Moustoir; Attendance: 11,581; Referee: Mikaël Lesage

21 December 2016 19	Saint-Étienne	0–0	Nancy	Saint-Étienne
20:50 CEST (UTC+2)	Lacroix (yellow card) 35'	Summary	Mandanne (yellow card) 22'; Cabaco (red card) 60'	Stadium: Stade Geoffroy-Guichard; Attendance: 26,621; Referee: (France) Olivier Thual

13 January 2017 20	Lille	1–1	Saint-Étienne	Villeneuve-d'Ascq
20:45 CEST (UTC+2)	De Préville 71'	Report	Hamouma 17'; Dabo (yellow card) 32'; Polomat (yellow card) 44'; Veretout (yellow card) 65'	Stadium: Stade Pierre-Mauroy; Attendance: 36,879; Referee: Mikaël Lesage

22 January 2017 21	Saint-Étienne	2–1	Angers	Saint-Étienne
17:00 CEST (UTC+2)	Veretout (yellow card) 44'; Bamba 51' (o.g.); Polomat (yellow card) 67'; Perrin 75'	Report	Pavlović 17'; Bamba (yellow card) 23'; Capelle (yellow card) 45+1'; Traoré (yellow card) 52'	Stadium: Stade Geoffroy-Guichard; Attendance: 20,456; Referee: Benoît Bastien

29 January 2017 22	Toulouse	0–3	Saint-Étienne	Toulouse
17:00 CEST (UTC+2)	Lafont (yellow card) 9'; Somália (red card) 47'; Braithwaite (yellow card) 60'	Report	Roux 9' (pen.), 67' (pen.), (yellow card) 51'; Veretout (yellow card) 12'; Malcuit (yellow card) 26'; Monnet-Paquet 55'; Théophile-Catherine (yellow card) 57'	Stadium: Stadium Municipal; Attendance: 12,950; Referee: Bartolomeu Varela

5 February 2017 23	Saint-Étienne	2–0	Lyon	Saint-Étienne
21:00 CEST (UTC+2)	Monnet-Paquet 9'; Hamouma 23'	Report		Stadium: Stade Geoffroy-Guichard; Attendance: 37,029; Referee: Bartolomeu Varela

8 February 2017 24	Nice	1–0	Saint-Étienne	Nice
18:00 CET (UTC+1)	Cyprien 7'; Belhanda (yellow card) 36'	Report	Hamouma (yellow card) 38'; Théophile-Catherine (yellow card) 40'; Selnæs (yellow card) 45'	Stadium: Allianz Riviera; Attendance: 18,225; Referee: Amaury Delerue

12 February 2017 25	Saint-Étienne	4–0	Lorient	Saint-Étienne
17:00 CEST (UTC+2)	Perrin 18'; Veretout 21'; Hamouma 58'; Jorginho 90+1'	Report		Stadium: Stade Geoffroy-Guichard; Attendance: 25,498; Referee: Benoît Millot

5 February 2017 26	Montpellier	2–1	Saint-Étienne	Saint-Étienne
21:00 CEST (UTC+2)	Lasne 49'; Mounié 51'	Report	Monnet-Paquet 12'	Stadium: Stade Geoffroy-Guichard; Attendance: 12,435; Referee: François Letexier

26 February 2017 27	Saint-Étienne	0–1	Caen	Saint-Étienne
CEST (UTC+2)		Report	Rodelin 33', (yellow card) 74'; Seube (yellow card) 79'	Stadium: Stade Geoffroy-Guichard; Attendance: 26,196; Referee: Ruddy Buquet

4 March 2017 28	Bastia	0 - 0	Saint-Étienne	Furiani
20:00 CEST (UTC+2)	Saint-Ruf (red card) 44'; Danic (yellow card) 70'	Report	Lemoine (red card) 65'; Corgnet (yellow card) 77'	Stadium: Stade Armand Cesari; Attendance: 10,174; Referee: (France) Nicolas Rainville

12 March 2017 29	Saint-Étienne	2 - 2	Metz	Saint-Étienne
15:00 CEST (UTC+2)	Berić 53'; Perrin 90+5'	Report	Sarr 1'; Falette 67'; Doukouré (yellow card) 69'	Stadium: Stade Geoffroy-Guichard; Attendance: 24,184; Referee: (France) Jérôme Miguelgorry

19 March 2017 30	Dijon FCO	0 - 1	Saint-Étienne	Dijon
17:00 CEST (UTC+2)	Diony (yellow card) 65'; Abeid (yellow card) 84'	Report	Veretout 77'; M'Bengue (yellow card) 90+1'	Stadium: Stade Gaston Gérard; Attendance: 12,960; Referee: (France) Benoît Bastien

2 April 2017 31	Monaco	v	Saint-Étienne	Monaco
				Stadium: Stade Louis II

9 April 2017 32	Saint-Étienne	1 - 1	Nantes	Saint-Étienne
17:00 CEST (UTC+2)	Veretout (yellow card) 68'; Corgnet 70'; M'Bengue (yellow card) 71'; Pierre-Gabriel (yellow card) 81'	Summary	Nakoulma 15' (yellow card) 74'; Thomasson (yellow card) 72'	Stadium: Stade Geoffroy-Guichard; Attendance: 30,134; Referee: (France) Clément Turpin

16 April 2017 33	Olympique de Marseille	4 - 0	Saint-Étienne	Marseille
21:00 CEST (UTC+2)	Thuavin 22' 58'; Gomis 31'; Evra (yellow card) 44'; Payet 90+3'	Summary	Hamouma (yellow card) 30'; Pierre-Gabriel (yellow card) 34'	Stadium: Orange Vélodrome; Attendance: 54,100; Referee: (France) Benoît Millot

23 April 2017 34	Saint-Étienne	1 - 1	Rennes	Saint-Étienne
17:00 CEST (UTC+2)	Berić 40'; Malcuit (yellow card) 85'	Report	Bensebaini (yellow card) 9'; Prcić (yellow card) 16'; Mexer (yellow card) 23' (goal) 45'	Stadium: Stade Geoffroy-Guichard; Attendance: 0 Referee: (France) Ruddy Buquet

29 April 2017 35	Guingamp	0 - 2	Saint-Étienne	Guingamp
20:00 CEST (UTC+2)		Report	Pajot 61'; Hamouma 86' (pen.)	Stadium: Stade de Roudourou; Attendance: 15,058; Referee: (France) Olivier Thual

5 May 2017 36	Saint-Étienne	2 - 2	Bordeaux	Saint-Étienne
20:45 CEST (UTC+2)	Berić 45'; Pajot 64'; Veretout (yellow card) 70'	Report	Larborde (yellow card) 12' (goal) 50'; Ounas 42' (pen.); Contento (yellow card) 61'; Pallois (red card) 90+2'	Stadium: Stade Geoffroy-Guichard; Attendance: 30,606; Referee: (France) Frank Schneider

14 May 2017 37	Saint-Étienne	0 - 5	Paris Saint-Germanin	Saint-Étienne
21:00 CEST (UTC+2)	Saivet (yellow card) 27'	Report	Cavani 2' 72'; Lucas Moura 38' 78'; Lo Celso (yellow card) 85'; Draxler 90'	Stadium: Stade Geoffroy-Guichard; Attendance: 34,352; Referee: (France) Amaury Delerue

17 May 2017 31	Monaco	2 - 0	Saint-Étienne	Monaco
21:00	Mbappé 19'; Bernardo Silva (yellow card) 67'; Germain 90+3'	Report	Lacroix (yellow card) 78'	Stadium: Stade Louis II; Attendance: 14,299; Referee: (France) Clément Turpin

20 May 2017 38	Nancy	3 - 1	Saint-Étienne	Tomblaine
21:00 CEST (UTC+2)	Busin 17'; Cabaco (yellow card) 56'; Diagne 59'; N'Guessan (yellow card) 62'; Maouassa 82'	Report	Nordin 74'	Stadium: Stade Marcel Picot; Attendance: 17,054; Referee: (France) Benoît Millot

=== Coupe de France ===
8 January 2017 Round of 64	IC Croix	1–4	Saint-Étienne	Villeneuve-d'Ascq, France
17:00 CET (UTC+1)	Dia (yellow card) 38', (goal) 43'; Derville (yellow card) 44'	Report	Hamouma 25'; Veretout 55'; Søderlund 78'; Keyta 90+4'	Stadium: Stade Pierre-Mauroy; Attendance: 3,538; Referee: Bartolomeu Varela

1 February 2017 Round of 32	AJ Auxerre	3 - 0 (a.e.t.)	Saint-Étienne	Auxerre
18:00 CET (UTC+1)	Yattara 97'; Birama Touré 105'; Boto 119'	Report		Stadium: Stade de l'Abbé-Deschamps; Attendance: 7,508; Referee: (France) Karim Abed

=== Coupe de la Ligue ===
14 December 2016 Round of 16	Saint-Étienne	0–1	Nancy	Saint-Étienne, France
21:05 CET (UTC+1)	Lacroix (yellow card) 17'	Report	Dalé 18' (pen.); Coulibaly (yellow card) 33'; Muratori (yellow card) 45'; N'Guessan (yellow card) 54'	Stadium: Stade Geoffroy-Guichard; Attendance: 13,372; Referee: (France) Fredy Fautrel

=== UEFA Europa League ===
==== Third qualifying round ====
28 July 2016 First leg	Saint-Étienne (France)	0–0	(Greece) AEK Athens	Saint-Étienne, France
20:00		Report		Stadium: Stade Geoffroy-Guichard; Attendance: 30,438; Referee: Antonio Damato, (Italy)

4 August 2016 Second leg	AEK Athens (Greece)	0–1 (0–1 agg.)	(France) Saint-Étienne	Athens, Greece
20:00		Report	Beric 23'; Tannane (yellow card) 47'	Stadium: Olympic Stadium; Attendance: 25,004; Referee: Alon Yefet, (Israel)

==== Play-off round ====
17 August 2016 First leg	Beitar Jerusalem (Israel)	1–2	(France) Saint-Étienne	Jerusalem, Israel
18:00 CEST (UTC+02:00)	Vered 8'	Report	Lemoine 15'; Rueda 30' (o.g.)	Stadium: Teddy Stadium; Attendance: 25,049; Referee: Michael Oliver (England)

25 August 2016 Second leg	Saint-Étienne (France)	0–0 (2–1 agg.)	(Israel) Beitar Jerusalem	Saint-Étienne, France
20:45 CEST (UTC+02:00)	Perrin (yellow card) 8'; Ruffier (red card) 45'; Berić (yellow card) 73'	Report	Shechter (yellow card) 44'; Mori (yellow card) 64'; Heister (yellow card) 70'; Benesh (yellow card) 80'	Stadium: Stade Geoffroy-Guichard; Referee: Matej Jug (Slovenia)

==== Group stage ====
Pos	Team	Pld	W	D	L	GF	GA	GD	Pts	Qualification	SET	AND	MNZ	QAB
1	(France) Saint-Étienne	6	3	3	0	8	5	+3	12	Advance to knockout phase	—	1–1	0–0	1–0
2	(Belgium) Anderlecht	6	3	2	1	16	8	+8	11	Advance to knockout phase	2–3	—	6–1	3–1
3	(Germany) Mainz 05	6	2	3	1	8	10	−2	9		1–1	1–1	—	2–0
4	(Azerbaijan) Gabala	6	0	0	6	5	14	−9	0		1–2	1–3	2–3	—

Source: UEFA
Rules for classification: Group stage tiebreakers

15 September 2016 1	Mainz (Germany)	1–1	(France) Saint-Étienne	Opel Arena, Mainz
19:00	Bungert 57'	Report	Berić 88'	Attendance: 20,275; Referee: Svein Oddvar Moen (Norway)

29 September 2016 2	Saint-Étienne (France)	1–1	(Belgium) Anderlecht	Saint-Étienne, France
21:05	Roux 90+4'	Report	Tielemans 62' (pen.)	Stadium: Stade Geoffroy-Guichard; Referee: Vladislav Bezborodov (Russia)

20 October 2016 3	Saint-Étienne (France)	1–0	(Azerbaijan) Gabala	Saint-Étienne, France
21:05	Ricardinho 70' (o.g.)	Report		Stadium: Stade Geoffroy-Guichard; Attendance: 22,855; Referee: Ali Palabıyık (Turkey)

3 November 2016 4	Gabala (Azerbaijan)	1–2	(France) Saint-Étienne	Baku, Azerbaijan
19:00	Qurbanov 39'	Report	Tannane 45+1'; Berić 53'	Stadium: Bakcell Arena; Referee: Carlos del Cerro Grande (Spain)

24 November 2016 5	Saint-Étienne (France)	0–0	(Germany) Mainz	Saint-Étienne, France
21:05		Report		Stadium: Stade Geoffroy-Guichard; Referee: Bas Nijhuis (Netherlands)

8 December 2016 6	Anderlecht (Belgium)	2–3	(France) Saint-Étienne	Anderlecht, Belgium
19:00	Chipciu 21'; Stanciu 31'	Report	Søderlund 62', 67'; Monnet-Paquet 74'	Stadium: Constant Vanden Stock Stadium; Referee: István Kovács (Romania)

==== Knockout phase ====
===== Round of 32 =====
16 February 2017 First leg	Manchester United (England)	3–0	(France) Saint-Étienne	Manchester, England
CET (UTC+01:00)	Ibrahimović 15', 75', 88' (pen.)			Stadium: Old Trafford

22 February 2017 Second leg	Saint-Étienne (France)	0–1 (0–4 agg.)	(England) Manchester United	Saint-Étienne, France
CET (UTC+01:00)			Mkhitaryan 16'	Stadium: Stade Geoffroy-Guichard

== Statistics ==
=== Appearances and goals ===
No.	Pos	Nat	Player	Total		Ligue 1		Coupe de France		Coupe de la Ligue		Europa League	
No.	Pos	Nat	Player	Apps	Goals	Apps	Goals	Apps	Goals	Apps	Goals	Apps	Goals
Goalkeepers
1	GK	(France) FRA	Anthony Maisonnial	2	0	1+1	0	0	0	0	0	0	0
16	GK	(France) FRA	Stéphane Ruffier	35	0	31	0	0	0	0	0	4	0
30	GK	(France) FRA	Jessy Moulin	7	0	6	0	0	0	0	0	0+1	0
Defenders
2	DF	(France) FRA	Kévin Théophile-Catherine	35	0	30+1	0	0	0	0	0	4	0
3	DF	(France) FRA	Pierre-Yves Polomat	14	0	6+5	0	0	0	0	0	3	0
4	DF	(Switzerland) SUI	Léo Lacroix	20	0	18+2	0	0	0	0	0	0	0
12	DF	(Senegal) SEN	Cheikh M'Bengue	15	0	15	0	0	0	0	0	0	0
19	DF	(Guinea) GUI	Florentin Pogba	21	1	16+1	1	0	0	0	0	4	0
20	DF	(France) FRA	Ronaël Pierre-Gabriel	14	0	11+3	0	0	0	0	0	0	0
24	DF	(France) FRA	Loïc Perrin	31	4	26+1	4	0	0	0	0	4	0
25	DF	(France) FRA	Kévin Malcuit	26	0	23+2	0	0	0	0	0	1	0
35	DF	(France) FRA	Mickaël Nadé	1	0	1	0	0	0	0	0	0	0
Midfielders
5	MF	(France) FRA	Vincent Pajot	25	3	15+6	3	0	0	0	0	2+2	0
6	MF	(France) FRA	Jérémy Clément	5	0	3+2	0	0	0	0	0	0	0
7	MF	(France) FRA	Bryan Dabo	16	0	8+6	0	0	0	0	0	1+1	0
8	MF	(France) FRA	Benjamin Corgnet	10	1	3+7	1	0	0	0	0	0	0
11	MF	(Senegal) SEN	Henri Saivet	27	1	21+6	1	0	0	0	0	0	0
14	MF	(France) FRA	Jordan Veretout	35	3	34+1	3	0	0	0	0	0	0
17	MF	(Norway) NOR	Ole Selnæs	30	0	23+3	0	0	0	0	0	4	0
18	MF	(France) FRA	Fabien Lemoine	20	1	9+7	0	0	0	0	0	4	1
31	MF	(Cape Verde) CPV	Kenny Rocha Santos	3	0	1+2	0	0	0	0	0	0	0
34	MF	(Ivory Coast) CIV	Habib Maïga	5	0	4+1	0	0	0	0	0	0	0
Forwards
9	FW	(France) FRA	Nolan Roux	25	4	12+9	4	0	0	0	0	2+2	0
10	FW	(Morocco) MAR	Oussama Tannane	21	1	14+3	1	0	0	0	0	2+2	0
21	FW	(France) FRA	Romain Hamouma	32	7	22+7	7	0	0	0	0	3	0
22	FW	(France) FRA	Kévin Monnet-Paquet	38	4	27+7	4	0	0	0	0	2+2	0
23	FW	(Norway) NOR	Alexander Søderlund	17	1	8+9	1	0	0	0	0	0	0
26	FW	(Portugal) POR	Jorginho	5	1	3+2	1	0	0	0	0	0	0
27	FW	(Slovenia) SLO	Robert Berić	26	7	18+4	6	0	0	0	0	3+1	1
32	FW	(France) FRA	Hamidou Keyta	4	0	2+2	0	0	0	0	0	0	0
33	FW	(France) FRA	Arnaud Nordin	15	2	5+10	2	0	0	0	0	0	0
–	FW	(France) FRA	Lamine Ghezali	1	0	0+1	0	0	0	0	0	0	0
Players transferred out during the season
31	FW	(Republic of the Congo) CGO	Dylan Saint-Louis	2	1	1	1	0	0	0	0	1	0
32	DF	(France) FRA	Benjamin Karamoko	1	0	1	0	0	0	0	0	0	0

Last updated: 30 May 2017
Source: BDFutbol

=== Goalscorers ===
Rank	No.	Pos	Nat	Name	Ligue 1	Coupe de France	Coupe de la Ligue	Europa League	Total
1	27	FW	(Slovenia)	Robert Berić	2	0	0	2	4
2	21	FW	(France)	Romain Hamouma	2	0	0	0	2
3	23	FW	(Norway)	Alexander Søderlund	1	0	0	0	1
3		FW	(France)	Dylan Saint-Louis	1	0	0	0	1
3	22	FW	(France)	Kévin Monnet-Paquet	1	0	0	0	1
3	18	MF	(France)	Fabien Lemoine	0	0	0	1	1
Own goal					0	0	0	1	1
Totals					6	0	0	4	10

Last updated: 10 September 2016
Source: Ligue 1 and UEFA

=== Clean sheets ===
Rank	No.	Nat	Name	Ligue 1	Coupe de France	Coupe de la Ligue	Europa League	Total

Last updated:
