= Kévin Monnet-Paquet =

French footballer (born 1988)

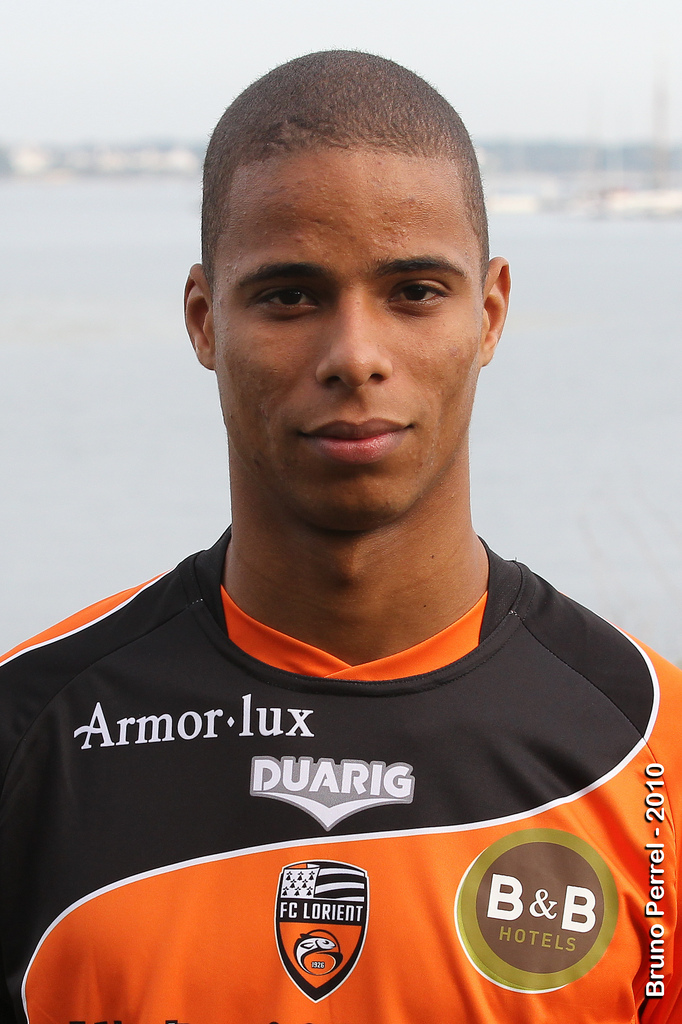
- Monnet-Paquet with Lorient in 2010

Personal information
- Date of birth: 19 August 1988 (age 38)
- Place of birth: Bourgoin-Jallieu, France
- Height: 1.83 m (6 ft 0 in)
- Position: Winger

Youth career
- 1995–2002: Bourgoin-Jallieu
- 2002–2006: Lens

Senior career*
Years	Team	Apps	(Gls)
2006–2011	Lens	92	(13)
2010–2011	→ Lorient (loan)	31	(0)
2011–2014	Lorient	106	(16)
2014–2021	Saint-Étienne	164	(11)
2021–2023	Aris Limassol	20	(3)
Total		413	(43)

International career
2007–2009	France U21	7	(0)
- * Club domestic league appearances and goals as of 5 June 2023

Kévin Monnet-Paquet (born 19 August 1988) is a French former professional footballer who played as a winger. Nicknamed Tuppy, spent his career with Lens, Lorient, and Saint-Étienne in France and Aris Limassol in Cyprus.

== Club career ==
Monnet-Paquet scored his first senior league goal with Lens against Valenciennes on 23 January 2008 in a 2–1 win away at the Stade Nungesser.

On 19 August 2021, Monnet-Paquet joined Aris Limassol in Cyprus.

== Personal life ==
Monnet-Paquet's mother is of Rwandan descent and his father is French.

== Career statistics ==
As of match played 27 May 2023

Appearances and goals by club, season and competition
Club	Season	League			National cup		League cup		Continental		Total	
Club	Season	Division	Apps	Goals	Apps	Goals	Apps	Goals	Apps	Goals	Apps	Goals
Lens	2006–07	Ligue 1	4	0	0	0	0	0	—		4	0
Lens	2007–08	Ligue 1	18	2	0	0	0	0	—		18	2
Lens	2008–09	Ligue 2	35	7	0	0	0	0	—		35	7
Lens	2009–10	Ligue 1	32	4	2	0	2	0	—		36	4
Lens	2010–11	Ligue 1	3	0	0	0	0	0	—		3	0
Lens	Total		92	13	2	0	2	0	—		96	13
Lorient	2010–11	Ligue 1	31	0	3	0	2	0	—		36	0
Lorient	2011–12	Ligue 1	35	6	1	0	4	1	—		40	7
Lorient	2012–13	Ligue 1	35	6	5	0	1	0	—		41	6
Lorient	2013–14	Ligue 1	36	4	1	0	1	0	—		38	4
Lorient	Total		137	16	10	0	8	1	—		155	17
Saint-Étienne	2014–15	Ligue 1	30	2	4	2	2	0	7 (Note: Appearances in the UEFA Europa League)	1	43	5
Saint-Étienne	2015–16	Ligue 1	31	2	1	0	0	0	11	3	43	5
Saint-Étienne	2016–17	Ligue 1	34	4	2	0	1	0	11	1	48	5
Saint-Étienne	2017–18	Ligue 1	30	2	0	0	1	0	—		31	2
Saint-Étienne	2018–19	Ligue 1	23	1	2	1	1	0	—		26	2
Saint-Étienne	2019–20	Ligue 1	0	0	0	0	0	0	0	0	0	0
Saint-Étienne	2020–21	Ligue 1	16	0	1	0	—		—		17	0
Saint-Étienne	Total		164	11	10	3	5	0	29	5	208	19
Aris Limassol	2021–22	Cypriot First Division	16	3	0	0	—		—		16	3
Aris Limassol	2022–23	Cypriot First Division	4	0	1	0	—		—		5	0
Aris Limassol	Total		20	3	1	0	—		—		21	3
Career total			413	43	23	3	15	1	29	5	480	52

== Honours ==
Lens

- Ligue 2: 2008–09

Aris Limassol

- Cypriot First Division: 2022–23
