= Yero Dia =

French football player (born 1982)

Personal information
- Full name: Yero Dia
- Date of birth: 5 January 1982 (age 44)
- Place of birth: Roubaix, France
- Height: 1.90 m (6 ft 3 in)
- Position: Defender

Team information
- Current team: Levadiakos

Senior career*
Years	Team	Apps	(Gls)
2004	ES Wasquehal	5	(0)
2004–2006	RAA La Louvière	7	(0)
2006–2007	Ethnikos Asteras	-	(-)
2007–2008	Levadiakos	5	(0)
- * Club domestic league appearances and goals as of 19 June 2008 ‡ National team caps and goals as of 19 June 2008

Yero Dia (born 5 January 1982) is a French football player who currently plays in Greece for Levadiakos.
