= Baptiste Valette =

French footballer (born 1992)

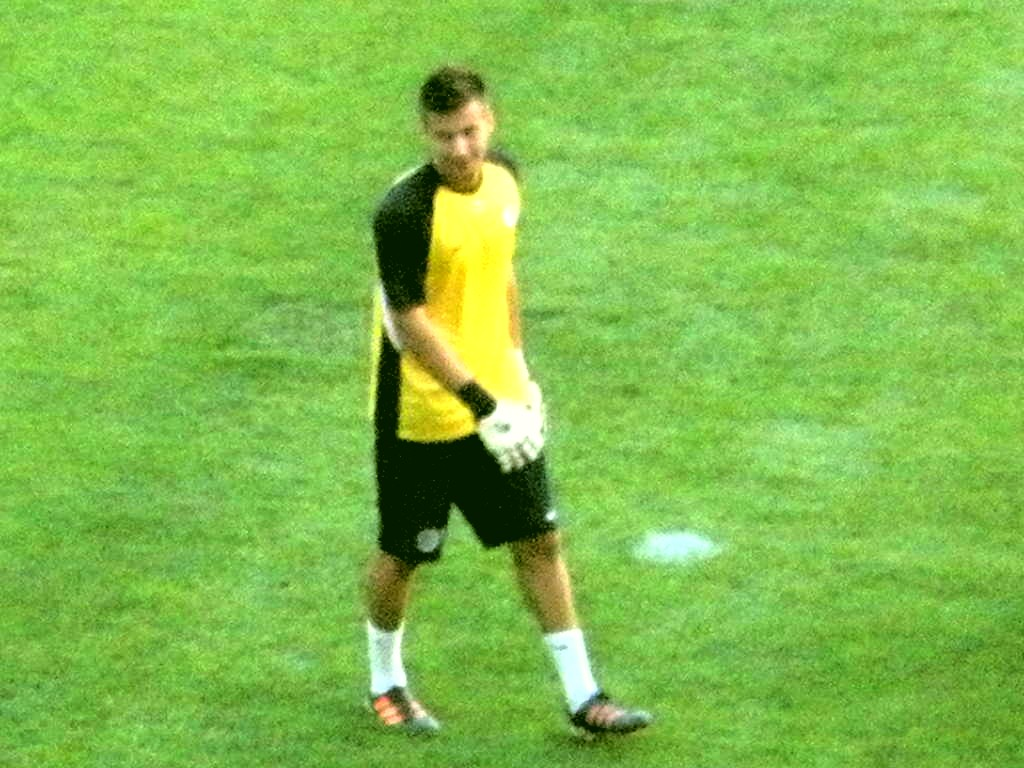
- Valette with Montpellier in 2012

Personal information
- Date of birth: 1 September 1992 (age 34)
- Place of birth: Sète, France
- Height: 1.85 m (6 ft 1 in)
- Position: Goalkeeper

Team information
- Current team: RC Grasse

Youth career
- 2008–2013: Montpellier

Senior career*
Years	Team	Apps	(Gls)
2012–2013	Montpellier II	10	(0)
2013–2015	Saint-Étienne	0	(0)
2013–2015	Saint-Étienne II	34	(0)
2015–2017	Virton	32	(0)
2017–2019	Nîmes II	3	(0)
2017–2019	Nîmes	29	(0)
2019–2022	Nancy	68	(0)
2021	Nancy II	1	(0)
2022–2023	Cholet	31	(0)
2023–2025	Sochaux	11	(0)
2024	Sochaux II	6	(0)
2025–	RC Grasse	3	(0)

International career
2013	France Beach	1	(0)
- * Club domestic league appearances and goals as of 13 December 2025

Baptiste Valette (born 1 September 1992) is a French professional footballer who plays as a goalkeeper for Championnat National 1 club RC Grasse.

== Club career ==
Valette signed with Nîmes Olympique after spells in the reserve sides of Montpellier HSC and Saint-Étienne, as well as R.E. Virton in the Belgian second division. Valette made his professional debut for Nîmes at the age of 25 in a 2–1 loss to Paris FC on 29 September 2017.

On 4 August 2022, Valette signed a one-year contract with Cholet in Championnat National.

== International career ==
Valette represented the France national beach soccer team at the 2013 Euro Beach Soccer League. He made his first appearance in a match against the Switzerland national beach soccer team.
