= Jonathan Brison =

French footballer (born 1983)

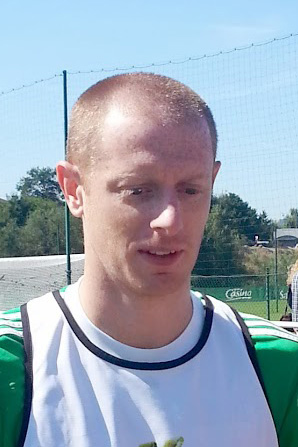
- Brison at training with Saint-Étienne

Personal information
- Date of birth: 7 February 1983 (age 43)
- Place of birth: Soissons, France
- Height: 1.79 m (5 ft 10 in)
- Position: Left-back

Senior career*
Years	Team	Apps	(Gls)
2002–2012	Nancy	241	(14)
2012–2016	Saint-Étienne	70	(1)
2016–2018	Chamois Niortais	28	(0)
Total		339	(15)
- * Club domestic league appearances and goals

Jonathan Brison (born 7 February 1983) is a French former professional footballer who played as a left-back.

== Career ==
Brison was born in Soissons, Aisne. A Nancy player since his youth, he got his debut in Ligue 2 in September 2002 in the 3–1 defeat to Clermont. Although it was never his preferred position, he played as left-back after breaking into the Nancy first-team.

As a wide midfielder, Brison played most of Nancy's games since establishing himself as a fixture in the team in the 2003–04 season. The following year he was singled out for particular praise for his performances in the promotion-winning team.

In January 2012 he joined Saint-Ètienne on a three-year contract.

In June 2016, he signed a three-year contract with Chamois Niortais. He left the club by mutual consent on 6 August 2018.

== Career statistics ==
Appearances and goals by club, season and competition
Club	Season	League			Coupe de France		Coupe de la Ligue		Total	
Club	Season	Division	Apps	Goals	Apps	Goals	Apps	Goals	Apps	Goals
Nancy	2002–03	Ligue 2	4	0	0	0	0	0	4	0
Nancy	2003–04	Ligue 2	26	1	3	0	0	0	29	1
Nancy	2004–05	Ligue 2	31	3	2	0	1	0	34	3
Nancy	2005–06	Ligue 1	30	3	1	0	5	1	36	4
Nancy	2006–07	Ligue 1	20	1	1	0	1	0	22	1
Nancy	2007–08	Ligue 1	26	2	2	0	3	0	31	2
Nancy	2008–09	Ligue 1	34	2	1	0	2	0	37	2
Nancy	2009–10	Ligue 1	26	2	0	0	1	0	27	2
Nancy	2010–11	Ligue 1	34	0	1	0	1	0	36	0
Nancy	2011–12	Ligue 1	10	0	1	0	1	0	12	0
Nancy	Total		70	1	6	0	3	0	79	1
Saint-Étienne	2011–12	Ligue 1	4	0	0	0	0	0	4	0
Saint-Étienne	2012–13	Ligue 1	24	0	1	0	2	0	27	0
Saint-Étienne	2013–14	Ligue 1	17	0	0	0	0	0	17	0
Saint-Étienne	2014–15	Ligue 1	18	1	2	0	0	0	20	1
Saint-Étienne	2015–16	Ligue 1	7	0	3	0	1	0	11	0
Saint-Étienne	Total		241	14	12	0	15	1	268	15
Chamois Niortais	2016–17	Ligue 2	7	0	0	0	0	0	7	0
Chamois Niortais	2017–18	Ligue 2	21	0	0	0	0	0	21	0
Chamois Niortais	Total		28	0	0	0	0	0	28	0
Career total			339	15	18	0	18	1	375	16

== Honours ==
Nancy

- Ligue 2: 2004–05
- Coupe de la Ligue: 2005–06

Saint-Étienne

- Coupe de la Ligue: 2012–13
