= Benjamin Corgnet =

French professional footballer (born 1987)

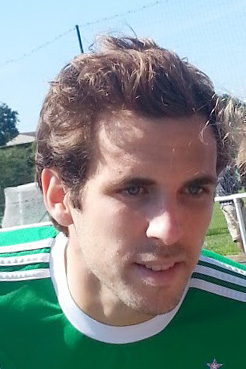
- Benjamin Corgnet at Saint-Étienne training in 2013

Personal information
- Full name: Benjamin Corgnet
- Date of birth: 6 April 1987 (age 39)
- Place of birth: Thionville, France
- Height: 1.80 m (5 ft 11 in)
- Position: Midfielder

Youth career
- 1998–2004: Saint-Genis Laval
- 2004–2009: Millery-Vourles

Senior career*
Years	Team	Apps	(Gls)
2009–2010	Monts d'Or Azergues	21	(3)
2010–2012	Dijon	72	(12)
2012–2013	Lorient	26	(5)
2013–2017	Saint-Étienne	78	(9)
2016–2017	Saint-Étienne B	9	(5)
2017–2020	Strasbourg	41	(1)
2018–2019	Strasbourg B	6	(2)
2021–2022	Bourg-en-Bresse	33	(6)
Total		286	(43)
- * Club domestic league appearances and goals

Benjamin Corgnet (born 6 April 1987) is a French former professional footballer who plays as a midfielder.

== Career ==
Corgnet had the opportunity to join the youth academy of Lyon aged 11, but his parents preferred that he concentrated on his studies. Instead he trained with Olympique Saint-Genis-Laval and from the age of 18 to 22 with US Millery Vourles. He joined fifth division side Monts d'Or Azergues in 2009, before being contacted by Dijon coach Patrice Carteron. He joined Dijon in the summer of 2010 after completing his education.

Corgnet made his professional debut with Dijon in a Coupe de la Ligue tie against Amiens on 30 July 2010. He made his league debut a week later, in the first round of Ligue 2 games against Angers. His first professional goal came on 17 September 2010, in the 5–1 Ligue 2 win over Evian.

Corgnet joined Lorient from Dijon on 4 September 2012 in a €6 million deal.

In July 2013, he joined Saint-Étienne in Ligue 1.

After four seasons with Saint-Étienne, Corgnet signed a three-year contract with Strasbourg in July 2017.

Without a club since being released by Strasbourg in the summer of 2020, Corgnet signed for Championnat National side Bourg-Péronnas in January 2021.
