= 2020–21 AS Nancy Lorraine season =

Nancy
2020–21 season
- Chairman: Jacques Rousselot
- Manager: Jean-Louis Garcia
- Stadium: Stade Marcel Picot
- Ligue 2: 8th
- Coupe de France: Eighth round
Home colours	Away colours

The 2020–21 AS Nancy Lorraine season was the club's 54th season in existence and its fourth consecutive season in the second flight of French football. In addition to the domestic league, Nancy participated in this season's edition of the Coupe de France. The season covered the period from 1 July 2020 to 30 June 2021.

== Players ==
=== First-team squad ===
As of 23 February 2021.

Note: Flags indicate national team as defined under FIFA eligibility rules; some limited exceptions apply. Players may hold more than one non-FIFA nationality.

No.	Pos.	Nation	Player
1	GK	FRA	Baptiste Valette
2	DF	FRA	Mathias Fischer
3	DF	MAR	Abdelhamid El Kaoutari
4	DF	FRA	Séga Coulibaly
5	DF	FRA	Giovanni Haag
6	MF	FRA	Grégoire Lefebvre
7	FW	MTQ	Mickaël Biron
8	MF	FRA	Warren Bondo
9	FW	CMR	Andé Dona Ndoh
10	MF	MAR	Amine Bassi
11	FW	FRA	Dorian Bertrand
13	MF	CIV	Serge N'Guessan
14	MF	FRA	Mehdi Merghem (on loan from Guingamp)
15	MF	CPV	Kenny Rocha Santos

No.	Pos.	Nation	Player
16	GK	FRA	Martin Sourzac
17	FW	SEN	Ousmane Cissokho
18	DF	FRA	Souleymane Karamoko
19	FW	FRA	Yanis Barka
20	MF	FRA	Aurélien Nguiamba
21	FW	CMR	Vinni Triboulet
22	DF	GUI	Ernest Seka (captain)
23	DF	SEN	Saliou Ciss
24	MF	CIV	Edmond Akichi
25	FW	FRA	Mons Bassouamina
26	FW	FRA	Aurélien Scheidler (on loan from Dijon)
27	DF	FRA	Rosario Latouchent
29	FW	FRA	Rayan Philippe (on loan from Dijon)
30	GK	FRA	Hugo Constant

== Transfers ==
=== In ===
No.	Pos	Player	Transferred from	Fee	Date	Source
15			TBD		1 July 2020	

=== Out ===
No.	Pos	Player	Transferred to	Fee	Date	Source
15			TBD		1 July 2020	

== Pre-season and friendlies ==
Win Draw Loss

25 July 2020 Friendly	Differdange 03 (Luxembourg)	0–3	(France) Nancy	Differdange, Luxembourg
18:30 CEST (UTC+2)		Report	Seka 26'; Triboulet 75'; Rocha Santos 85'	Stadium: Stade de la Ville de Differdange

1 August 2020 Friendly	Nancy (France)	Cancelled	(France) Strasbourg	Tomblaine, France
18:00 CEST (UTC+2)				Stadium: Stade Marcel Picot

4 August 2020 Friendly	SAS Épinal (France)	2–3	(France) Nancy	Épinal, France
18:00 CEST (UTC+2)	Niang 57'; Da Silva 90+7'	Report	Cissokho 47' (pen.); Triboulet 60'; Biron 82'	Stadium: Stade de la Colombière

8 August 2020 Friendly	Nancy (France)	2–1	(Germany) 1. FC Saarbrücken	Tomblaine, France
18:00 CEST (UTC+2)	Triboulet 11'; Cissokho 45'	Report	Mendler 39'	Stadium: Stade Marcel Picot

15 August 2020 Friendly	SV Sandhausen (Germany)	3–3	(France) Nancy	Sandhausen, Germany
17:00 CEST (UTC+2)	Engels 37'; Bouhaddouz 65'; Türpitz 118' (pen.)	Report	Biron 35'; Triboulet 50', 69'	Stadium: BWT-Stadion am Hardtwald
Note: Match was played in four 30-minute quarters.

== Competitions ==
=== Overview ===
Competition	First match	Last match	Starting round	Final position	Record							
Competition	First match	Last match	Starting round	Final position	Pld	W	D	L	GF	GA	GD	Win %
Ligue 2	22 August 2020	15 May 2021	Matchday 1	8th	38	11	14	13	53	53	+0	28.95
Coupe de France	20 January 2021		Eighth round	Eighth round	1	0	0	1	0	1	−1	0.00
Total					39	11	14	14	53	54	−1	28.21

Source: Soccerway

=== Ligue 2 ===
==== League table ====
Pos	Team	Pld	W	D	L	GF	GA	GD	Pts
6	Auxerre	38	16	14	8	64	43	+21	62
7	Sochaux	38	12	15	11	45	37	+8	51
8	Nancy	38	11	14	13	53	53	0	47
9	Guingamp	38	10	17	11	41	43	−2	47
10	Amiens	38	11	14	13	34	40	−6	47

Source: Ligue 2
Rules for classification: 1) Points; 2) Goal difference; 3) Number of goals scored; 4) Head-to-head goal difference; 5) Fair play points

==== Results summary ====
Overall								Home						Away					
Pld	W	D	L	GF	GA	GD	Pts	W	D	L	GF	GA	GD	W	D	L	GF	GA	GD
38	11	14	13	53	53	0	47	6	8	5	28	28	0	5	6	8	25	25	0

Source: Ligue 2

==== Results by round ====
Round	1	2	3	4	5	6	7	8	9	10	11	12	13	14	15	16	17	18	19	20	21	22	23	24	25	26	27	28	29	30	31	32	33	34	35	36	37	38
Ground	A	H	A	A	H	A	H	A	H	A	H	A	H	A	H	A	H	A	H	A	H	H	A	H	A	H	A	H	A	H	A	H	A	H	A	H	A	H
Result	L	D	L	W	L	D	W	L	W	L	L	L	L	D	D	L	D	W	D	D	D	D	D	W	W	L	W	W	W	W	L	D	L	W	D	L	D	D
Position	16	16	15	13	17	16	14	15	12	14	15	17	18	17	17	18	17	15	17	16	17	18	17	16	14	15	15	10	9	8	8	9	10	8	8	9	9	8

Source: Ligue 2
A = Away; H = Home; W = Win; D = Draw; L = Loss

==== Matches ====
The league fixtures were announced on 9 July 2020.

22 August 2020 1	Amiens	1–0	Nancy	Amiens
19:00 CEST (UTC+2)	Papeau (yellow card) 32'; Lewis (yellow card) 61'; Guirassy 72'; Khalid (red card) 90'	Report	Akichi (yellow card) 47'; Ciss (yellow card) 52'; Seka (yellow card) 72'	Stadium: Stade de la Licorne; Referee: Romain Lissorgue

29 August 2020 2	Nancy	2–2	Guingamp	Tomblaine
15:00 CEST (UTC+2)	Biron 63', 69'	Report	Gomis 56'; Phaeton 90+2'	Stadium: Stade Marcel Picot; Referee: Olivier Thual

12 September 2020 3	Niort	1–0	Nancy	Niort
19:00 CEST (UTC+2)	Bâ 55'	Report		Stadium: Stade René Gaillard; Referee: Alexandre Perreau Niel

19 September 2020 4	Paris FC	0–2	Nancy	Paris
19:00 CEST (UTC+2)		Report	Biron 74'; Barka 90+4'	Stadium: Stade Sébastien Charléty; Attendance: 2,446; Referee: Mathieu Vernice

26 September 2020 5	Nancy	0–1	Le Havre	Tomblaine
19:00 CEST (UTC+2)		Report	Gibaud 66'	Stadium: Stade Marcel Picot; Attendance: 4,191; Referee: Romain Delpech

3 October 2020 6	Pau	1–1	Nancy	Pau
19:00 CEST (UTC+2)	Karamoko 40' (o.g.)	Report	Barka 86'	Stadium: Stade du Hameau; Attendance: 0 Referee: Pierre Gaillouste

17 October 2020 7	Nancy	2–1	Dunkerque	Tomblaine
19:00 CEST (UTC+2)	Haag 31'; Bassi 43'	Report	Diarra 73'	Stadium: Stade Marcel Picot; Attendance: 0 Referee: Sylvain Palhies

31 October 2020 9	Nancy	2–1	Châteauroux	Tomblaine
19:00 CET (UTC+1)	Bassi 54'; Coulibaly 71'	Report	Grange 15'	Stadium: Stade Marcel Picot; Attendance: 0 Referee: Guillaume Paradis

7 November 2020 10	Caen	2–1	Nancy	Caen
19:00 CET (UTC+1)	Coulibaly 30' (o.g.); Gioacchini 90'	Report	Rocha Santos 27'	Stadium: Stade Michel d'Ornano; Attendance: 0 Referee: Bastien Dechepy

24 November 2020 8	Grenoble	1–0	Nancy	Grenoble
19:00 CET (UTC+1)	Diallo 38'; Mombris (penalty missed) 79'	Report		Stadium: Stade des Alpes; Attendance: 0 Referee: Gaël Angoula

28 November 2020 12	Clermont	2–0	Nancy	Clermont-Ferrand
19:00 CET (UTC+1)	Dossou 30'; Allevinah 69'	Report		Stadium: Stade Gabriel Montpied; Attendance: 0 Referee: Sylvain Palhies

1 December 2020 13	Nancy	1–3	Toulouse	Tomblaine
18:00 CET (UTC+1)	Biron 25'	Report	Healey 54'; Spierings 65' (pen.); Rouault (red card) 70'	Stadium: Stade Marcel Picot; Attendance: 0 Referee: Johan Hamel

5 December 2020 14	Sochaux	1–1	Nancy	Montbéliard
20:00 CET (UTC+1)	Virginius 51'; Diedhiou (red card) 59'	Report	Rocha Santos 57'	Stadium: Stade Auguste Bonal; Attendance: 0 Referee: Arnaud Baert

12 December 2020 15	Nancy	2–2	Auxerre	Tomblaine
19:00 CET (UTC+1)	Seka 31'; Bassi 48' (pen.)	Report	Autret 32'; Sakhi 35'	Stadium: Stade Marcel Picot; Attendance: 0 Referee: Alain Durieux

15 December 2020 11	Nancy	2–3	Troyes	Tomblaine
20:00 CET (UTC+1)	Bassi 5'; Ciss 21'	Report	Gory 15'; Touzghar 27'; Seka 45+3' (o.g.)	Stadium: Stade Marcel Picot; Attendance: 0 Referee: Rémi Landry

18 December 2020 16	Ajaccio	1–0	Nancy	Ajaccio
20:00 CET (UTC+1)	Moussiti-Oko 45+3'	Report		Stadium: Stade François Coty; Attendance: 0 Referee: Olivier Thual

22 December 2020 17	Nancy	3–3	Chambly	Tomblaine
20:00 CET (UTC+1)	Bondo 11'; Triboulet 74'; Haag 81'	Report	Gonzalez 18'; Heinry 56', 90'	Stadium: Stade Marcel Picot; Attendance: 0 Referee: Karim Abed

5 January 2021 18	Valenciennes	2–3	Nancy	Valenciennes
20:00 CET (UTC+1)	Guillaume 45'; Cabral 52'	Report	Biron 59'; Rocha Santos 77'; Cissokho 90' (pen.)	Stadium: Stade du Hainaut; Attendance: 0 Referee: Nicolas Rainville

8 January 2021 19	Nancy	2–2	Rodez	Tomblaine
20:00 CET (UTC+1)	Coulibaly 9'; Triboulet 70'	Report	Boissier 26'; Coulibaly 90+1' (o.g.)	Stadium: Stade Marcel Picot; Attendance: 0 Referee: Mathieu Vernice

16 January 2021 20	Guingamp	0–0	Nancy	Guingamp
19:00 CET (UTC+1)		Report		Stadium: Stade du Roudourou; Attendance: 0 Referee: Guillaume Paradis

23 January 2021 21	Nancy	2–2	Niort	Tomblaine
19:00 CET (UTC+1)	Conté 28' (o.g.); Biron 82'	Report	Doukansy (yellow card) 6' (yellow-red card) 45+1'; Bâ 12', 62'	Stadium: Stade Marcel Picot; Attendance: 0 Referee: Gaël Angoula

30 January 2021 22	Nancy	1–1	Paris FC	Tomblaine
19:00 CET (UTC+1)	Biron 14'	Report	Boli 28'	Stadium: Stade Marcel Picot; Attendance: 0 Referee: Rémi Landry

2 February 2021 23	Le Havre	1–1	Nancy	Le Havre
20:00 CET (UTC+1)	Thiaré (penalty missed) 41'; Seka 85' (o.g.)	Report	Rocha Santos 49'	Stadium: Stade Océane; Attendance: 0 Referee: Pierre Gaillouste

5 February 2021 24	Nancy	1–0	Pau	Tomblaine
20:00 CET (UTC+1)	Ciss 25'	Report		Stadium: Stade Marcel Picot; Attendance: 0 Referee: Bartolomeu Varela

13 February 2021 25	Dunkerque	1–2	Nancy	Dunkirk
19:00 CET (UTC+1)	Tchokounté 24'	Report	Biron 54', 75'	Stadium: Stade Marcel-Tribut; Attendance: 0 Referee: Arnaud Baert

20 February 2021 26	Nancy	1–2	Grenoble	Tomblaine
19:00 CET (UTC+1)	Haag 23'	Report	Bénet 79' (pen.); Djitté 90+3'	Stadium: Stade Marcel Picot; Attendance: 0 Referee: Jérôme Miguelgorry

27 February 2021 27	Châteauroux	1–4	Nancy	Châteauroux
18:00 CET (UTC+1)	Ibara 72'	Report	Biron 31', 41', 48'; Scheidler 63'	Stadium: Stade Gaston Petit; Attendance: 0 Referee: Olivier Thual

2 March 2021 28	Nancy	1–0	Caen	Tomblaine
20:00 CET (UTC+1)	Scheidler 7'	Report		Stadium: Stade Marcel Picot; Attendance: 0 Referee: Bartolomeu Varela

13 March 2021 29	Troyes	1–5	Nancy	Troyes
20:00 CET (UTC+1)	Mutombo (yellow card) 13'; Salmier (yellow card) 19'; Touzghar (penalty missed) 23'; Giraudon (yellow card) 43'; Haag 61' (o.g.)	Report	Rocha Santos 15' (pen.), 20' (pen.); Scheidler (yellow card) 26', (goal) 46'; Triboulet 76'; Haag 86'	Stadium: Stade de l'Aube; Attendance: 0 Referee: Alexandre Perreau Niel

20 March 2021 30	Nancy	1–0	Clermont	Tomblaine
20:00 CET (UTC+1)	Rocha Santos (yellow card) 31'; Latouchent (yellow card) 43'; Ciss 90'; Merghem (yellow card) 90+1'	Report	Berthomier (yellow card) 63'	Stadium: Stade Marcel Picot; Attendance: 0 Referee: Abdelatif Kherradji

3 April 2021 31	Toulouse	4–1	Nancy	Toulouse
15:00 CEST (UTC+2)	Gabrielsen (yellow card) 16', (goal) 50'; Ciss 32' (o.g.); Healey (yellow card) 36'; Antiste 47'; Adli 62'; Spierings (yellow card) 82'	Report	Bassi 43'; Triboulet (yellow card) 77'	Stadium: Stadium de Toulouse; Attendance: 0 Referee: Romain Lissorgue

10 April 2021 32	Nancy	0–0	Sochaux	Tomblaine
20:00 CEST (UTC+2)	Ciss (yellow card) 43'	Report	Martial (yellow card) 45+1'	Stadium: Stade Marcel Picot; Attendance: 0 Referee: Mehdi Mokhtari

17 April 2021 33	Auxerre	3–2	Nancy	Auxerre
20:00 CEST (UTC+2)	Lloris 19'; Jubal Jr. 41', (yellow card) 52'; Arcus (yellow card) 65'; Coeff 84'	Report	Scheidler 3'; Akichi (yellow card) 48'; El Kaoutari (yellow card) 58'; Seka 71'	Stadium: Stade de l'Abbé-Deschamps; Referee: Florent Batta

20 April 2021 34	Nancy	2–0	Ajaccio	Tomblaine
20:00 CEST (UTC+2)	Ciss 63', 79'	Report		Stadium: Stade Marcel Picot; Attendance: 0 Referee: Bastien Dechepy

24 April 2021 35	Chambly	1–1	Nancy	Chambly
20:00 CEST (UTC+2)	Gonzalez (yellow card) 22'; Correa 55' (pen.); Camelo (yellow card) 68'	Report	Bassi (yellow card) 41'; Wooh (yellow card) 50'; Triboulet 75'	Stadium: Stade des Marais; Referee: Gaël Angoula

1 May 2021 36	Nancy	1–3	Valenciennes	Tomblaine
20:00 CEST (UTC+2)	Bassi 31'	Report	Boutoutaou 1', 60'; Ntim (yellow card) 29'; Kankava (yellow card) 70'; Chergui 79'	Stadium: Stade Marcel Picot; Referee: Romain Delpech

8 May 2021 37	Rodez	1–1	Nancy	Rodez
20:00 CEST (UTC+2)	Bonnet 77'; Célestine (yellow card) 81'; Boissier (yellow card) 90+1'	Report	Bassi 74'; Biron (yellow card) 81'	Stadium: Stade Paul-Lignon; Referee: Abdelatif Kherradji

15 May 2021 38	Nancy	2–2	Amiens	Tomblaine
20:00 CEST (UTC+2)	Wooh 60', 90+3'	Report	Yatabaré (yellow card) 26'; Odey 45', 46'	Stadium: Stade Marcel Picot; Referee: Sylvain Palhies

=== Coupe de France ===
20 January 2021 Eighth round	Nancy	0–1	Sochaux	Nancy
18:30 CET (UTC+1)		Report	El Kaoutari 60' (o.g.)	Stadium: Stade Marcel Picot; Attendance: 0 Referee: Benjamin Lepaysant

== Statistics ==
=== Goalscorers ===
As of

Rank	No.	Pos	Nat	Name	Ligue 2	Coupe de France	Total
		FW		[[]]			
Totals							
