= 2019–20 AS Nancy Lorraine season =

AS Nancy Lorraine
2019–20 season
- Chairman: Jacques Rousselot
- Manager: Jean-Louis Garcia
- Stadium: Stade Marcel Picot
- Ligue 2: 12th
- Coupe de France: Round of 32
- Coupe de la Ligue: Third round
- Top goalscorer: League: Vagner (7); All: Vagner (8)
Home colours	Away colours	Third colours

The 2019–20 season was the 53rd season in the existence of AS Nancy Lorraine and the club's third consecutive season in the second division of French football. In addition to the domestic league, Nancy participated in this season's editions of the Coupe de France and the Coupe de la Ligue. The season was scheduled to cover the period from 1 July 2019 to 30 June 2020.

== Players ==
=== First-team squad ===
As of 15 February 2020.

Note: Flags indicate national team as defined under FIFA eligibility rules; some limited exceptions apply. Players may hold more than one non-FIFA nationality.

No.	Pos.	Nation	Player
1	GK	FRA	Baptiste Valette
3	DF	MAR	Abdelhamid El Kaoutari
4	DF	FRA	Samir Bouzar
5	DF	FRA	Ryan Bidounga
6	MF	FRA	Grégoire Lefebvre
7	FW	SEN	Ousmane Cissokho
8	MF	FRA	Vincent Marchetti
9	FW	CMR	Andé Dona Ndoh
10	MF	MAR	Amine Bassi
11	FW	FRA	Dorian Bertrand
12	DF	FRA	Loris Néry
13	MF	CIV	Serge N'Guessan
14	DF	NIG	Hervé Lybohy

No.	Pos.	Nation	Player
15	MF	CPV	Kenny Rocha Santos
16	GK	FRA	Martin Sourzac
17	FW	FRA	Malaly Dembélé
18	DF	FRA	Souleymane Karamoko
19	FW	FRA	Yanis Barka
22	DF	GUI	Ernest Seka
23	DF	SEN	Saliou Ciss
24	MF	CIV	Edmond Akichi
25	FW	FRA	Mons Bassouamina
26	DF	FRA	Vincent Muratori
27	FW	CPV	Vagner Gonçalves (on loan from St-Étienne)
29	FW	SEN	Makhtar Gueye (on loan from St-Étienne)
30	GK	FRA	Hugo Constant

=== Out on loan ===
Note: Flags indicate national team as defined under FIFA eligibility rules; some limited exceptions apply. Players may hold more than one non-FIFA nationality.

No.	Pos.	Nation	Player
—	DF	FRA	Séga Coulibaly (on loan at Avranches)
—	DF	FRA	Mathias Fischer (on loan at Béziers)
—	MF	FRA	Giovanni Haag (on loan at Gazélec Ajaccio)

No.	Pos.	Nation	Player
—	MF	FRA	Aurélien Nguiamba (on loan at Gazélec Ajaccio)
—	FW	FRA	Vinni Triboulet (on loan at Virton)

== Pre-season and friendlies ==
Win Draw Loss

6 July 2019 Friendly	SV Sandhausen (Germany)	1–0	(France) Nancy	Bahlingen, Germany
17:00 CEST (UTC+2)				Stadium: Kaiserstuhlstadion

16 July 2019 Friendly	Troyes (France)	1–1	(France) Nancy	Saint-Dizier, France
18:30 CEST (UTC+2)				Stadium: Stade Marcel Jacquin

20 July 2019 Friendly	Nancy (France)	2–2	(France) Dijon	Tomblaine, France
19:00 CEST (UTC+2)				Stadium: Stade Marcel-Picot

== Competitions ==
=== Overview ===
Competition	First match	Last match	Starting round	Final position	Record							
Competition	First match	Last match	Starting round	Final position	Pld	W	D	L	GF	GA	GD	Win %
Ligue 2	26 July 2019	6 March 2020	Matchday 1	12th	28	6	16	6	27	26	+1	21.43
Coupe de France	17 November 2019	18 January 2020	Seventh round	Round of 32	4	3	0	1	7	5	+2	75.00
Coupe de la Ligue	13 August 2019	30 October 2019	First round	Third round	3	2	0	1	4	3	+1	66.67
Total					35	11	16	8	38	34	+4	31.43

Source: Soccerway

=== Ligue 2 ===
==== League table ====
Pos	Team	Pld	W	D	L	GF	GA	GD	Pts
10	Chambly	28	9	8	11	26	32	−6	35
11	Auxerre	28	8	10	10	31	30	+1	34
12	Nancy	28	6	16	6	27	26	+1	34
13	Caen	28	8	10	10	33	34	−1	34
14	Sochaux	28	8	10	10	28	30	−2	34

Source: Ligue 2
Rules for classification: 1) Points; 2) Goal difference; 3) Number of goals scored; 4) Head-to-head goal difference; 5) Fair play points

==== Results summary ====
Overall								Home						Away					
Pld	W	D	L	GF	GA	GD	Pts	W	D	L	GF	GA	GD	W	D	L	GF	GA	GD
28	6	16	6	27	26	+1	34	6	6	2	16	9	+7	0	10	4	11	17	−6

Source: Ligue 2

==== Results by round ====
Round	1	2	3	4	5	6	7	8	9	10	11	12	13	14	15	16	17	18	19	20	21	22	23	24	25	26	27	28	29	30	31	32	33	34	35	36	37	38
Ground	H	A	H	H	A	H	A	H	A	H	A	H	A	H	A	H	A	H	A	H	A	A	H	A	H	A	H	A	H	A	H	A	H	A	H	A	H	A
Result	D	D	D	W	L	D	D	W	D	W	D	D	D	D	D	W	L	W	D	W	L	D	D	D	L	L	L	D	C	C	C	C	C	C	C	C	C	C
Position	11	10	14	10	13	14	14	13	12	9	9	10	9	10	9	8	10	9	10	7	8	9	9	9	10	10	14	12	12	12	12	12	12	12	12	12	12	12

Source: Ligue 2
A = Away; H = Home; W = Win; D = Draw; L = Loss

==== Matches ====
The league fixtures were announced on 14 June 2019. The Ligue 2 matches were suspended by the LFP on 13 March 2020 due to COVID-19 until further notices. On 28 April 2020, it was announced that Ligue 1 and Ligue 2 campaigns would not resume, after the country banned all sporting events until September. On 30 April, The LFP ended officially the 2019–20 season.

26 July 2019 1	Nancy	0–0	Orléans	Tomblaine
20:00 CEST (UTC+2)		Report		Stadium: Stade Marcel Picot; Referee: Gaël Angoula

2 August 2019 2	Valenciennes	1–1	Nancy	Valenciennes
20:00 CEST (UTC+2)		Report		Stadium: Stade du Hainaut; Referee: Pierre Gaillouste

9 August 2019 3	Nancy	1–1	Lorient	Tomblaine
20:00 CEST (UTC+2)		Report		Stadium: Stade Marcel Picot

16 August 2019 4	Nancy	2–1	Le Mans	Tomblaine
20:00 CEST (UTC+2)		Report		Stadium: Stade Marcel Picot; Referee: Mehdi Mokhtari

23 August 2019 5	Sochaux	3–0	Nancy	Montbéliard
20:00 CEST (UTC+2)		Report		Stadium: Stade Auguste Bonal; Referee: Willy Delajod

30 August 2019 6	Nancy	1–1	Rodez	Tomblaine
20:00 CEST (UTC+2)		Report		Stadium: Stade Marcel Picot; Referee: Aurélien Petit

13 September 2019 7	Guingamp	1–1	Nancy	Guingamp
20:00 CEST (UTC+2)		Report		Stadium: Stade de Roudourou; Referee: Nicolas Rainville

20 September 2019 8	Nancy	3–0	Chambly	Tomblaine
20:00 CEST (UTC+2)		Report		Stadium: Stade Marcel Picot; Referee: Romain Lissorgue

27 September 2019 9	Clermont	2–2	Nancy	Clermont-Ferrand
20:00 CEST (UTC+2)		Report		Stadium: Stade Gabriel Montpied; Referee: Arnaud Baert

4 October 2019 10	Nancy	2–1	Niort	Tomblaine
20:00 CEST (UTC+2)	Ciss 48'; Vagner 52'	Report	Sissoko 41'	Stadium: Stade Marcel Picot; Referee: Bastien Dechepy

18 October 2019 11	Ajaccio	0–0	Nancy	Ajaccio
20:00 CEST (UTC+2)		Report		Stadium: Stade François Coty; Referee: Romain Lissorgue

25 October 2019 12	Nancy	0–0	Lens	Tomblaine
20:00 CEST (UTC+2)		Report		Stadium: Stade Marcel Picot

4 November 2019 13	Le Havre	1–1	Nancy	Le Havre
20:45 CET (UTC+1)	Kadewere 39' (pen.)	Report	Vagner 62' (pen.)	Stadium: Stade Océane; Referee: Nicolas Rainville

8 November 2019 14	Nancy	0–0	Troyes	Tomblaine
20:00 CET (UTC+1)		Report		Stadium: Stade Marcel Picot; Referee: Rémi Landry

22 November 2019 15	Grenoble	1–1	Nancy	Grenoble
20:00 CET (UTC+1)	Djitté 57'	Report	Vagner 90'	Stadium: Stade des Alpes; Referee: Pierre Gaillouste

29 November 2019 16	Nancy	2–0	Paris FC	Tomblaine
20:00 CET (UTC+1)	Bassi 21'; Gueye 80'	Report		Stadium: Stade Marcel Picot; Referee: Benjamin Lepaysant

2 December 2019 17	Caen	1–0	Nancy	Caen
20:45 CET (UTC+1)	Gioacchini 60'	Report		Stadium: Stade Michel d'Ornano; Referee: Johan Hamel

13 December 2019 18	Nancy	2–1	Châteauroux	Tomblaine
20:00 CET (UTC+1)	Ciss 80'; Ndoh 90'	Report	Operi 18'	Stadium: Stade Marcel Picot; Referee: Rémi Landry

20 December 2019 19	Auxerre	0–0	Nancy	Auxerre
20:00 CET (UTC+1)		Report		Stadium: Stade de l'Abbé-Deschamps; Referee: Bartolomeu Varela

10 January 2020 20	Nancy	1–0	Valenciennes	Tomblaine
20:00 CET (UTC+1)	Gueye 34'	Report		Stadium: Stade Marcel Picot; Referee: Cédric Dos Santos

24 January 2020 21	Lorient	2–1	Nancy	Lorient
20:00 CET (UTC+1)	Marveaux 29'; Bozok 90'	Report	Lybohy 74'	Stadium: Stade du Moustoir; Referee: Ruddy Buquet

31 January 2020 22	Le Mans	1–1	Nancy	Le Mans
20:00 CET (UTC+1)	Kanté 82'	Report	Ciss 58'	Stadium: MMArena; Referee: Arnaud Baert

4 February 2020 23	Nancy	1–1	Sochaux	Tomblaine
21:05 CET (UTC+1)	Bertrand 14'	Report	Sané 73'	Stadium: Stade Marcel Picot; Referee: Bartolomeu Varela

7 February 2020 24	Rodez	1–1	Nancy	Rodez
20:00 CET (UTC+1)	Sané 87'	Report	Ciss 17'	Stadium: Stade Paul-Lignon; Referee: Benjamin Lepaysant

15 February 2020 25	Nancy	0–1	Guingamp	Tomblaine
15:00 CET (UTC+1)		Report	Rodelin 56'	Stadium: Stade Marcel Picot; Referee: Cédric Dos Santos

21 February 2020 26	Chambly	2–1	Nancy	Beauvais
20:00 CET (UTC+1)	Correa 61'; Jaques 78' (pen.)	Report	Bassi 41'	Stadium: Stade Pierre Brisson; Referee: Alexandre Perreau Niel

28 February 2020 27	Nancy	1–2	Clermont	Tomblaine
20:00 CET (UTC+1)	Cissokho 69' (pen.)	Report	González 47', 81'	Stadium: Stade Marcel Picot; Referee: Nicolas Rainville

6 March 2020 28	Niort	1–1	Nancy	Niort
20:00 CET (UTC+1)	Sissoko 40'	Report	Bassi 80' (pen.)	Stadium: Stade René Gaillard; Referee: Rémi Landry

13 March 2020 29	Nancy	Cancelled	Ajaccio	Tomblaine
20:00 CET (UTC+1)				Stadium: Stade Marcel Picot

23 March 2020 30	Lens	Cancelled	Nancy	Lens
20:45 CET (UTC+1)				Stadium: Stade Bollaert-Delelis

6 April 2020 31	Nancy	Cancelled	Le Havre	Tomblaine
20:00 CET (UTC+1)				Stadium: Stade Marcel Picot

10 April 2020 32	Troyes	Cancelled	Nancy	Troyes
				Stadium: Stade de l'Aube

17 April 2020 33	Nancy	Cancelled	Grenoble	Tomblaine
				Stadium: Stade Marcel Picot

21 April 2020 34	Paris FC	Cancelled	Nancy	Paris
				Stadium: Stade Sébastien Charléty

24 April 2020 35	Nancy	Cancelled	Caen	Tomblaine
				Stadium: Stade Marcel Picot

1 May 2020 36	Châteauroux	Cancelled	Nancy	Châteauroux
				Stadium: Stade Gaston Petit

8 May 2020 37	Nancy	Cancelled	Auxerre	Tomblaine
				Stadium: Stade Marcel Picot

15 May 2020 38	Orléans	Cancelled	Nancy	Orléans
				Stadium: Stade de la Source

=== Coupe de France ===
17 November 2019 Seventh round	Nancy	2–1	AS Belfort Sud	Tomblaine (Note: Tie reversed from original draw, due to AS Belfort Sud not being able to provide a suitable ground.)
14:00 CET (UTC+1)	Dona Ndoh 19'; Seka 90+7'	Report	Saoudi 27' (pen.); Benhamroura (yellow card) 39' (yellow-red card) 90'	Stadium: Stade Marcel Picot; Attendance: 400; Referee: Faouzi Benchabane

8 December 2019 Eighth round	ASPV Strasbourg	1–3	Nancy	Strasbourg
15:00 CET (UTC+1)	Kahla 90'	Report	Dona Ndoh 35'; Bassi 36'; N'Guessan 87'	Stadium: Stadium Emile-Stahl; Attendance: 1,500; Referee: Alexandre Perreau Niel

5 January 2020 Round of 64	Olympique Grande-Synthe	0–1	Nancy	Dunkirk
17:15 CET (UTC+1)		Report	Gueye 88'	Stadium: Stade Marcel-Tribut; Attendance: 1,168; Referee: Alexandre Perreau Niel

18 January 2020 Round of 32	ASM Belfort	3–1	Nancy	Belfort
15:00 CET (UTC+1)	Grasso 7'; Régnier 73', 78' (pen.)	Report	Dembélé 25', (red card) 58'	Stadium: Stade Roger Serzian; Attendance: 2,181; Referee: Nicolas Rainville

=== Coupe de la Ligue ===
13 August 2019 First round	Caen	0–1	Nancy	Caen
20:00 CEST (UTC+2)			Gueye 64'	Stadium: Stade Michel d'Ornano; Attendance: 7,807; Referee: Nicolas Rainville

27 August 2019 Second round	Nancy	1–0	Ajaccio	Tomblaine
18:45 CEST (UTC+2)	Dembélé 67'			Stadium: Stade Marcel Picot; Attendance: 5,071; Referee: Arnaud Baert

30 October 2019 Round of 32	Montpellier	3–2	Nancy	Montpellier
21:05 CET (UTC+1)	Mollet 13'; Delort 21'; Congré (yellow card) 28'; Chotard (yellow card) 62', (goal) 76'; Cozza (red card) 68'; Sambia (yellow card) 88'		Lefebvre (yellow card) 42'; Dembélé (yellow card) 57'; Vagner 59'; Lybohy (yellow card) 66', (goal) 89'	Stadium: Stade de la Mosson; Attendance: 7,655; Referee: Hakim Ben El Hadj
