= 2025–26 Dijon FCO season =

Dijon FCO
2025–26 season
- President: Pierre-Henri Deballon
- Manager: Baptiste Ridira
- Stadium: Stade Gaston Gérard
- Championnat National: 1st
colours	colours

The 2025-26 season is the 28th in the history of Dijon FCO.During this season the club will participate in the following competitions: Championnat National.

== Players ==
=== First team ===
As of 7 September 2026

Note: Flags indicate national team as defined under FIFA eligibility rules; some limited exceptions apply. Players may hold more than one non-FIFA nationality.

No.	Pos.	Nation	Player
4	MF	FRA	Mickaël Barreto
5	DF	FRA	Quentin Bernard
6	DF	SEN	Waly Diouf
7	MF	COM	Ben-Chayeel Hamada
8	MF	FRA	Paul Bellon
9	FW	FRA	Tyris Dong
10	FW	FRA	Yanis Barka
11	FW	CPV	Júlio Tavares
14	MF	FRA	Jordan Marié
15	DF	FRA	Axel Bargain
16	GK	FRA	Paul Delecroix
17	MF	FRA	Adel Lembezat
18	MF	COD	Brandon Ndezi
19	DF	FRA	César Obongo

No.	Pos.	Nation	Player
20	MF	FRA	Hugo Vargas-Rios
21	MF	TUN	Samy Chouchane
23	DF	FRA	Lenny Lacroix
29	FW	FRA	Alexis Ntamack
30	MF	FRA	Hatem Mimoune
31	DF	FRA	Moussa Faty
33	FW	FRA	Florian Rombogouera
37	FW	COM	Abdelmajid Djae
42	FW	FRA	Ylan Aka
46	GK	FRA	Ylann Marie-Rose
71	GK	FRA	Enzo Ketterle
90	FW	CIV	Ange Lago
93	DF	MAR	Ismaïl Bouleghcha
—	DF	MAR	Anass Benyahya

==== Out on loan ====
Note: Flags indicate national team as defined under FIFA eligibility rules; some limited exceptions apply. Players may hold more than one non-FIFA nationality.

No. / Pos. / Nation / Player; — / DF / FRA / Brayan Djadja (at Istres until 30 June 2027)	No. / Pos. / Nation / Player; — / MF / FRA / Loris Dupont (at Voltigeurs de Châteaubriant until 30 June 2027)

== Pre-season and friendlies ==
9 July 2025 Friendly	Dijon FCO (France)	0–0	(France) Le Puy	Dijon
17:00 CET		Report		Stadium: Stade Gaston Gérard

12 July 2025 Friendly	Dijon FCO (France)	2–0	(France) Montlouis	Dijon
17:00 CET		Report		Stadium: Stade Gaston Gérard

18 July 2025 Friendly	Dijon FCO (France)	2–2	(France) Fleury	Dijon
18:00 CET	Lembezat 32'; Domingues 45'	Report	Nadir Homssa 58'; Farade 71'	Stadium: Stade Gaston Gérard

23 July 2025 Friendly	Dijon FCO (France)	2–1	(France) Sochaux	Dijon
18:00 CET		Report		Stadium: Stade Gaston Gérard

25 July 2025 Friendly	Troyes (France)	0–0	(France) Dijon FCO	Troyes
18:00 CET		Report		Stadium: Stade de l'Aube

1 August 2025 Friendly	Dijon FCO (France)	3–1	(France) Biesheim	Dijon
19:30 CET	Hugo Vargas-Rios 16' 85' (pen.); Barka 65'	Report	Joseph Gyeboaho 77'	Stadium: Stade Gaston Gérard

== Competitive ==
=== Overall record ===
Competition	First match	Last match	Starting round	Final position	Record							
Competition	First match	Last match	Starting round	Final position	Pld	W	D	L	GF	GA	GD	Win %
Championnat National	8 August 2025	15 May 2026	Matchday 1	Winners	32	18	11	3	52	25	+27	56.25
Total					32	18	11	3	52	25	+27	56.25

Last updated: 15 May 2026
Source: worldfootball

=== Championnat National ===
==== League table ====
Pos	Team	Pld	W	D	L	GF	GA	GD	Pts	Promotion, qualification or relegation
1	Dijon (C, P)	32	18	11	3	52	25	+27	65	Promotion to Ligue 2
2	Sochaux (P)	32	16	10	6	51	26	+25	58	Promotion to Ligue 2
3	Rouen	32	14	13	5	43	29	+14	55	Qualification to promotion play-offs
4	Fleury	32	15	9	8	47	30	+17	54	Qualification to Ligue 3
5	Versailles	32	15	8	9	46	34	+12	53	Qualification to Ligue 3

Source: NATIONAL
Rules for classification: 1) head-to-head results; 2) head-to-head goal difference; 3) goal difference; 4) goals scored; 5) fair play points
(C) Champions; (P) Promoted

==== Results summary ====
Overall								Home						Away					
Pld	W	D	L	GF	GA	GD	Pts	W	D	L	GF	GA	GD	W	D	L	GF	GA	GD
32	18	11	3	52	25	+27	65	9	5	2	32	15	+17	9	6	1	20	10	+10

Last updated: 15 May 2026.
Source: worldfootball

==== Results by round ====
Round	1	2	3	4	5	6	7	8	9	10
Ground	A	H	A	H	A	H		H	A	H
Result	W	D	D	W	D					
Position	2	5	5	3	3					

Updated to match(es) played on 5 September 2025. Source: worldfootball
A = Away; H = Home; W = Win; D = Draw; L = Loss

==== Matches ====
8 August 2025 1	Orléans	1–2	Dijon	Orléans
19:30 CEST	El Khoumisti 49'; Mamadou Sylla (yellow card) 59'	Report	Lembezat (yellow card) 19'; Brandon Ndezi (yellow card) 43'; Marié (yellow card) 63'; Alexis Ntamack 78'; Domingues 86' (pen.)	Stadium: Stade de la Source; Attendance: 2,225; Referee: (France) Dorian Bovolenta

15 August 2025 2	Dijon	1–1	Rouen	Dijon
19:30 CEST	Barka 2'; Delecroix (yellow card) 20'; Moco (yellow card) 61'; Marié (yellow card) 71'	Report	Dany Goprou (yellow card) 17'; Rocha 21' (pen.) (yellow card) 34'	Stadium: Stade Gaston Gérard; Attendance: 5,367; Referee: (France) Soulaimane Chamel

22 August 2025 3	Stade Briochin	0–0	Dijon	Saint-Brieuc
19:30 CEST	Sadia Diakhabi (yellow card) 29'	Report	Bernard (yellow card) 23' (yellow-red card) 54'; Lembezat (yellow card) 53'	Stadium: Stade Fred-Aubert; Attendance: 1,366; Referee: (France) Edgar Barenton

29 August 2025 4	Dijon	4–2	Paris 13 Atletico	Dijon
19:30 CEST	Ismail Diallo 10'; Domingues 44' (pen.) 90+2'; Lembezat (yellow card) 45+1' (goal) 57'; Marié (yellow card) 45+4'; Brandon Ndezi (yellow card) 51'	Report	Ecuele Manga (yellow card) 42'; Nicolas Bernardiño (yellow card) 52'; Yoane Lasme 82' 85'	Stadium: Stade Gaston Gérard; Attendance: 4,579; Referee: (France) Benjamin Lepaysant

5 September 2025 5	Caen	0–0	Dijon	Caen
18:30 CEST	Diakité (yellow card) 59'; M'Vila (yellow card) 59'; Mandrea (yellow card) 69'	Report	Lembezat (yellow card) 42'; Marié (yellow card) 53'; Hugo Vargas-Rios (yellow card) 73'; Bernard (yellow card) 75'	Stadium: Stade Michel d'Ornano; Attendance: 10,565; Referee: (France) Robin Chapapria
