= 2023–24 RWD Molenbeek season =

R.W.D. Molenbeek
2023–24 season
- Manager: Vincent Euvrard (until 24 July); Cláudio Caçapa (from 25 July to 11 February); Bruno Irles (from 13 February to 23 March); Yannick Ferrera (from 23 March)
- Stadium: Edmond Machtens Stadium
- Relegation play-offs: 4th (relegated)
- Belgian Pro League: 16th
- Belgian Cup: Quarter-finals
- Top goalscorer: League: Makhtar Gueye (8); All: Makhtar Gueye (8)
- Average home league attendance: 5,828
- Biggest win: RWD Molenbeek 3–0 Sint-Truiden
- Biggest defeat: Club Brugge 7–1 RWD Molenbeek

The 2023–24 season was R.W.D. Molenbeek's ninth season in existence and first one back in the Belgian Pro League. RWDM also competed in the Belgian Cup.

== Players ==
=== First-team squad ===
As of 20 January 2024.

Note: Flags indicate national team as defined under FIFA eligibility rules; some limited exceptions apply. Players may hold more than one non-FIFA nationality.

No.	Pos.	Nation	Player
1	GK	BEL	Nicolas Alavoine
2	DF	ECU	Luis Segovia (on loan from Botafogo)
3	DF	FRA	Florian Le Joncour
4	DF	BRA	Klaus
5	DF	BEL	Alexis De Sart
6	MF	BEL	Pierre Dwomoh (on loan from Antwerp)
7	FW	MTQ	Mickaël Biron
8	MF	JPN	Shuto Abe
9	FW	SEN	Makhtar Gueye
14	FW	BEL	Kylian Hazard
15	MF	BEL	Sada Diallo
17	DF	BEL	Ilay Camara
19	DF	BEL	Jonathan Heris
20	MF	BEL	Théo Gécé
21	DF	BEL	Fabrice Sambu
23	MF	BRA	Del Piage
26	DF	BRA	Abner

No.	Pos.	Nation	Player
27	FW	BRA	Rikelmi (on loan from Botafogo)
28	GK	BEL	Guillaume Hubert
29	DF	FRA	Mamadou Sarr (on loan from Lyon)
30	MF	FRA	Xavier Mercier
31	FW	BOL	Sebastian Joffre
32	DF	BEL	Djovkar Doudaev
33	GK	FRA	Théo Defourny
43	DF	BRA	David Sousa
44	DF	MLI	Moussa Sissako (on loan from Sochi)
47	FW	SEN	Pathé Mboup
62	MF	BRA	Kayque (on loan from Botafogo)
69	MF	FRA	Florent Da Silva (on loan from Lyon)
70	GK	BDI	Mattéo Nkurunziza
77	MF	FRA	Jeff Reine-Adélaïde
89	FW	BRA	Carlos Alberto (on loan from Botafogo)
94	DF	BRA	Philipe Sampaio (on loan from Botafogo)
99	DF	MLI	Youssouf Koné

=== Out on loan ===
Note: Flags indicate national team as defined under FIFA eligibility rules; some limited exceptions apply. Players may hold more than one non-FIFA nationality.

No.	Pos.	Nation	Player
—	GK	BEL	Jonathan De Bie (at Lokeren-Temse until 30 June 2024)
—	FW	BEL	Niklo Dailly (at Francs Borains until 30 June 2024)

No.	Pos.	Nation	Player
—	FW	GHA	Ernest Nuamah (at (France) Lyon until 30 June 2024)

== Pre-season and friendlies ==
Win Draw Loss Fixtures

23 July 2023 Friendly	RWD Molenbeek	1–0	Lyon
18:00

8 September 2023 Friendly	RWD Molenbeek	1–2	Valenciennes
15:00

== Competitions ==
=== Overall record ===
Competition	First match	Last match	Starting round	Final position	Record							
Competition	First match	Last match	Starting round	Final position	Pld	W	D	L	GF	GA	GD	Win %
Belgian Pro League	29 July 2023		Matchday 1		0	0	0	0	0	0	+0	—
Belgian Cup	1 November 2023	17 January 2024	Seventh round	Quarter-finals	3	2	0	1	2	2	+0	66.67
Total					3	2	0	1	2	2	+0	66.67

Last updated: January 2024
Source: Soccerway

=== Belgian Pro League ===
==== League table ====
Pos	Team	Pld	W	D	L	GF	GA	GD	Pts	Qualification or relegation
12	OH Leuven	30	7	8	15	34	47	−13	29	Qualification for the Europe play-offs
13	Charleroi	30	7	8	15	26	48	−22	29	Qualification for the relegation play-offs
14	Eupen	30	7	3	20	24	58	−34	24	Qualification for the relegation play-offs
15	Kortrijk	30	6	6	18	22	57	−35	24	Qualification for the relegation play-offs
16	RWD Molenbeek	30	5	8	17	31	67	−36	23	Qualification for the relegation play-offs

Source: Jupiler Pro League (in Dutch), Soccerway
Rules for classification: 1) Points; 2) Matches won; 3) Goal difference; 4) Goals scored; 5) Away matches won; 6) Away goal difference; 7) Away goals scored; 8) Play-off.

==== Results summary ====
Overall								Home						Away					
Pld	W	D	L	GF	GA	GD	Pts	W	D	L	GF	GA	GD	W	D	L	GF	GA	GD
21	5	6	10	22	41	−19	21	3	4	4	12	18	−6	2	2	6	10	23	−13

Last updated: January 2024.

==== Results by round ====
Round	1	2	3	4	5	6	7	8	9	10	11	12	13	14	15	16	17	18	19	20	21
Ground	H	A	H	A	H	A	H	A	H	A	H	A	H	A	A	H	A	H	H	A	H
Result	L	W	W	L	L	D	W	D	D	L	D	L	D	W	L	D	L	W	L	L	L
Position	16	10	8	10	11	11	11	9	9	10	11	12	11	10	11	11	11	10	11	13	

Updated to match(es) played on January 2024. Source:
A = Away; H = Home; W = Win; D = Draw; L = Loss

==== Matches ====
The league fixtures were unveiled on 22 June 2023.

29 July 2023 1	RWD Molenbeek	0–4	Genk	Molenbeek-Saint-Jean
20:45		Report	Fadera 31'; Heynen 38' (pen.); Muñoz 45'; Cuesta 71'	Stadium: Edmond Machtens Stadium; Referee: Wesli De Cremer
