= Makhtar Gueye (footballer) =

Senegalese footballer (born 1997)

Personal information
- Date of birth: 4 December 1997 (age 28)
- Place of birth: Dakar, Senegal
- Height: 1.95 m (6 ft 5 in)
- Position: Striker

Team information
- Current team: Shanghai Shenhua
- Number: 29

Youth career
- US Gorée
- 2015: Saint-Étienne

Senior career*
Years	Team	Apps	(Gls)
2016–2020	Saint-Étienne II	25	(9)
2018–2020	Saint-Étienne	5	(1)
2019–2020	→ Nancy (loan)	20	(5)
2020–2023	Oostende	66	(23)
2022–2023	→ Zaragoza (loan)	22	(0)
2023–2024	RWD Molenbeek	32	(11)
2024–2026	Blackburn Rovers	60	(6)
2026–	Shanghai Shenhua	7	(5)
- * Club domestic league appearances and goals as of 1 May 2026 (UTC)

Makhtar Gueye (born 4 December 1997) is a Senegalese professional footballer who plays as a striker for Shanghai Shenhua.

== Club career ==
=== Saint-Étienne ===
Gueye made his first team debut for AS Saint-Étienne in a 1–1 Ligue 1 away draw Strasbourg on 19 August 2018. He replaced Ole Selnæs in the 84th minute and scored the equaliser four minutes later.

=== Oostende ===
In 2020, Gueye moved to Belgian side K.V. Oostende.

==== Loan to Zaragoza ====
On 31 August 2022, Gueye joined Zaragoza in Spain on a season-long loan.

=== RWD Molenbeek ===
On 30 July 2023, newly-promoted Belgian Pro League side RWD Molenbeek announced the signing of Gueye on a three-year contract, for a reported fee of €3 million.

=== Blackburn Rovers ===
On 30 July 2024, Gueye joined Blackburn Rovers on a three-year deal through to June 2027, with a 12-month option. He scored his first goal for Blackburn on 13 August 2024 in an EFL Cup tie against Stockport County.

=== Shanghai Shenhua ===
On 13 January 2026, Gueye joined Shanghai Shenhua for an Undisclosed fee.

== Career statistics ==
As of match played 1 May 2026

Appearances and goals by club, season and competition
Club	Season	League			National cup (Note: Includes Coupe de France, Belgian Cup, Copa del Rey, FA Cup)		League cup (Note: Includes Coupe de la Ligue, EFL Cup)		Continental (Note: Includes AFC Champions League Elite)		Other		Total	
Club	Season	Division	Apps	Goals	Apps	Goals	Apps	Goals	Apps	Goals	Apps	Goals	Apps	Goals
Saint-Étienne II	2017–18	National 3	8	3	—		—		—		—		8	3
Saint-Étienne II	2018–19	National 2	17	6	—		—		—		—		17	6
Saint-Étienne II	Total		25	9	—		—		—		—		25	9
Saint-Étienne	2018–19	Ligue 1	5	1	0	0	0	0	—		—		5	1
Nancy (loan)	2019–20	Ligue 2	20	5	2	1	2	1	—		—		24	7
KV Oostende	2020–21	Belgian First Division A	31	11	2	2	—		—		2 (Note: Appearances in Belgian First Division A European play-offs)	0	35	13
KV Oostende	2021–22	Belgian First Division A	31	12	1	0	—		—		—		32	12
KV Oostende	2022–23	Belgian Pro League	4	0	0	0	—		—		—		4	0
KV Oostende	Total		66	23	3	2	—		—		2	0	71	25
Zaragoza (loan)	2022–23	Segunda División	22	0	1	0	—		—		—		23	0
RWD Molenbeek	2023–24	Belgian Pro League	32	11	3	0	—		—		—		35	11
Blackburn Rovers	2024–25	Championship	44	6	1	0	2	2	—		—		47	8
Blackburn Rovers	2025–26	Championship	16	0	0	0	1	0	—		—		17	0
Blackburn Rovers	Total		60	6	1	0	3	2	—		—		64	8
Shanghai Shenhua	2026	Chinese Super League	7	5	0	0	—		2	0	—		9	5
Career total			237	60	10	3	5	3	2	0	2	0	256	66
