= 2018–19 AS Saint-Étienne season =

Saint-Étienne
2018–19 season
- Chairman: Bernard Caiazzo; Roland Romeyer
- Manager: Jean-Louis Gasset
- Stadium: Stade Geoffroy-Guichard
- Ligue 1: 4th
- Coupe de France: Round of 32
- Coupe de la Ligue: Round of 32
- Top goalscorer: League: Wahbi Khazri (13); All: Wahbi Khazri (14)
- Highest home attendance: 41,594 (vs. Lyon – 20 January 2019)
- Lowest home attendance: 8,193 (vs. Dijon – 23 January 2019)
Home colours	Away colours	Third colours

The 2018–19 AS Saint-Étienne season was the 99th professional season of the club since its creation in 1919.

== Players ==
=== First-team squad ===
Note: Flags indicate national team as defined under FIFA eligibility rules; some limited exceptions apply. Players may hold more than one non-FIFA nationality.

No.	Pos.	Nation	Player
1	GK	FRA	Théo Vermot
3	DF	FRA	Pierre-Yves Polomat
4	DF	FRA	William Saliba
5	DF	FRA	Timothée Kolodziejczak (on loan from Tigres)
6	MF	FRA	Yann M'Vila
7	FW	FRA	Rémy Cabella
8	MF	FRA	Mahdi Camara
9	FW	FRA	Loïs Diony
10	FW	TUN	Wahbi Khazri
11	DF	BRA	Gabriel Silva
12	DF	SEN	Cheikh M'Bengue
13	FW	SEN	Makhtar Gueye
16	GK	FRA	Stéphane Ruffier (vice-captain)

No.	Pos.	Nation	Player
17	MF	NOR	Ole Selnæs
18	FW	FRA	Arnaud Nordin
19	FW	FRA	Yannis Salibur (on loan from Guingamp)
21	FW	FRA	Romain Hamouma
22	FW	FRA	Kévin Monnet-Paquet
24	DF	FRA	Loïc Perrin (captain)
25	MF	SEN	Assane Dioussé
26	DF	FRA	Mathieu Debuchy
27	FW	SLO	Robert Berić
28	DF	SRB	Neven Subotić
30	GK	FRA	Jessy Moulin
33	DF	FRA	Mickaël Panos
50	GK	FRA	Stefan Bajic

=== Out on loan ===
Note: Flags indicate national team as defined under FIFA eligibility rules; some limited exceptions apply. Players may hold more than one non-FIFA nationality.

No.	Pos.	Nation	Player
—	GK	FRA	Alexis Guendouz (on loan to Pau)
—	DF	GRE	Alexandros Katranis (on loan to Mouscron)
—	DF	SUI	Léo Lacroix (on loan to Hamburger SV)
—	MF	GBS	Jorginho (on loan to CSKA Sofia)

No.	Pos.	Nation	Player
—	MF	CIV	Habib Maïga (on loan to Metz)
—	MF	FRA	Rayan Souici (on loan to L'Entente SSG)
—	MF	MAR	Oussama Tannane (on loan to FC Utrecht)
—	FW	FRA	Franck Honorat (on loan to Clermont)

== Competitions ==
=== Ligue 1 ===
==== League table ====
Pos	Team	Pld	W	D	L	GF	GA	GD	Pts	Qualification or relegation
2	Lille	38	22	9	7	68	33	+35	75	Qualification to Champions League group stage
3	Lyon	38	21	9	8	70	47	+23	72	Qualification to Champions League group stage
4	Saint-Étienne	38	19	9	10	59	41	+18	66	Qualification to Europa League group stage
5	Marseille	38	18	7	13	60	52	+8	61	
6	Montpellier	38	15	14	9	53	42	+11	59	

Source: Ligue 1 and Soccerway
Rules for classification: 1) Points; 2) Goal difference; 3) Head-to-head points; 4) Head-to-head goal difference; 5) Head-to-head goals scored; 6) Head-to-head away goals scored; 7) Goals scored; 8) Away goals scored; 9) Most goals scored in single league match; 10) Fairplay ranking.

==== Results summary ====
Overall								Home						Away					
Pld	W	D	L	GF	GA	GD	Pts	W	D	L	GF	GA	GD	W	D	L	GF	GA	GD
38	19	9	10	59	41	+18	66	13	2	4	34	14	+20	6	7	6	25	27	−2

Last updated: 24 May 2019.
Source: Competitive matches

==== Results by round ====
Round	1	2	3	4	5	6	7	8	9	10	11	12	13	14	15	16	17	18	19	20	21	22	23	24	25	26	27	28	29	30	31	32	33	34	35	36	37	38
Ground	H	A	A	H	A	H	A	H	A	H	A	H	H	A	H	A	H	A	H	A	H	A	H	A	H	A	A	H	A	H	A	H	A	H	A	H	H	A
Result	W	D	D	D	L	W	W	W	L	D	D	W	W	L	W	L	W	D	W	W	L	D	W	L	L	W	L	L	W	W	D	W	W	W	W	L	W	D
Position	9	8	8	9	14	8	6	4	5	6	6	5	5	6	6	6	6	5	5	4	4	4	4	6	5	4	5	6	5	4	4	4	4	4	4	4	4	4

Source: Results
A = Away; H = Home; W = Win; D = Draw; L = Loss

==== Matches ====
Win Draw Loss

11 August 2018 1	Saint-Étienne	2–1	Guingamp	Saint-Étienne
20:00 CEST (UTC+2)	Diony (yellow card) 25', (goal) 80'; Khazri 45'; Selnæs (yellow card) 54'; Ruffier (yellow card) 55'	Report	Thuram 56' (pen.); Kerbrat (yellow card) 60'	Stadium: Stade Geoffroy-Guichard; Attendance: 26,006; Referee: Amaury Delerue

19 August 2018 2	Strasbourg	1–1	Saint-Étienne	Strasbourg
15:00 CEST (UTC+2)	Mitrović (yellow card) 5'; Gonçalves 55'	Report	Subotić (red card) 18'; M'Vila (yellow card) 77'; Khazri (yellow card) 80'; Gueye 88'	Stadium: Stade de la Meinau; Attendance: 25,385; Referee: Benoît Millot

25 August 2018 3	Montpellier	0–0	Saint-Étienne	Montpellier
20:00 CEST (UTC+2)	Hilton (yellow card) 46'; Aguilar (yellow card) 50'; Lasne (yellow card) 54'	Report		Stadium: Stade de la Mosson; Attendance: 14,777; Referee: Jérôme Brisard

2 September 2018 4	Saint-Étienne	0–0	Amiens	Saint-Étienne
15:00 CEST (UTC+2)	Salibur (yellow card) 36'; Khazri (yellow card) 58'; Selnæs (yellow card) 70'	Report	Zungu (yellow card) 33'; Monconduit (yellow card) 63'	Stadium: Stade Geoffroy-Guichard; Attendance: 30,146; Referee: Thomas Léonard

14 September 2018 5	Paris Saint-Germain	4–0	Saint-Étienne	Paris
20:45 CEST (UTC+2)	Draxler 23'; Rabiot (yellow card) 38'; Cavani 51' (pen.); Di María 76'; Diaby 84'	Report	Khazri (yellow card) 63'	Stadium: Parc des Princes; Attendance: 46,549; Referee: Frank Schneider

22 September 2018 6	Saint-Étienne	2–1	Caen	Saint-Étienne
20:00 CEST (UTC+2)	Khazri (yellow card) 34', (goal) 48' (pen.); Kolodziejczak (yellow card) 49' (goal) 65'	Report	Guilbert (yellow card) 8'; Fajr 31'; Diomandé (yellow card) 35'; Mbengue (yellow card) 47'	Stadium: Stade Geoffroy-Guichard; Attendance: 23,895; Referee: Ruddy Buquet

25 September 2018 7	Toulouse	2–3	Saint-Étienne	Toulouse
21:00 CEST (UTC+2)	Gradel 63'; Durmaz 78'; Todibo (yellow card) 87'	Report	Monnet-Paquet (yellow card) 21'; Diony 23'; Cabella 66', (yellow card) 90+2'; Salibur (yellow card) 75'	Stadium: Stadium Municipal; Attendance: 14,008; Referee: Amaury Delerue

28 September 2018 8	Saint-Étienne	2–0	Monaco	Saint-Étienne
20:45 CEST (UTC+2)	Khazri 41', 54'	Report	N'Doram (yellow card) 13'	Stadium: Stade Geoffroy-Guichard; Attendance: 26,486; Referee: Jérôme Brisard

6 October 2018 9	Lille	3–1	Saint-Étienne	Villeneuve-d'Ascq
17:00 CEST (UTC+2)	Bamba 17', 46'; Xeka (yellow card) 26'; Ballo-Touré (yellow card) 76'; Pépé 85'	Report	Cabella 26' (pen.); Selnæs (yellow card) 74'	Stadium: Stade Pierre-Mauroy; Attendance: 31,263; Referee: Jérôme Miguelgorry

21 October 2018 10	Saint-Étienne	1–1	Rennes	Saint-Étienne
17:00 CEST (UTC+2)	Khazri 4' (pen.); Diony (yellow card) 89'	Report	Sarr 34'; Bensebaini (yellow card) 45'	Stadium: Stade Geoffroy-Guichard; Attendance: 29,557; Referee: Clément Turpin

26 October 2018 11	Nîmes	1–1	Saint-Étienne	Nîmes
20:45 CEST (UTC+2)	Alioui 74'; Bouanga (yellow card) 90+2'	Report	Cabella 1', (yellow card) 83'; M'Vila (yellow card) 66'; Khazri (yellow card) 90+5'	Stadium: Stade des Costières; Attendance: 15,412; Referee: François Letexier

4 November 2018 12	Saint-Étienne	4–3	Angers	Saint-Étienne
17:00 CET (UTC+1)	Diony 26'; Debuchy 45+1'; Nordin (yellow card) 50'; Manceau 73' (o.g.); Hamouma 89'	Report	Pavlović 24'; Reine-Adélaïde (yellow card) 29'; Tait 45+4'; Bahoken 71'	Stadium: Stade Geoffroy-Guichard; Attendance: 22,983; Referee: Thomas Léonard

10 November 2018 13	Saint-Étienne	2–0	Reims	Saint-Étienne
20:00 CET (UTC+1)	Debuchy 1'; Hamouma (yellow card) 27'; Khazri 39'; Diony (yellow card) 67'; Gabriel Silva (yellow card) 80'	Report	Chavalerin (yellow card) 18'	Stadium: Stade Geoffroy-Guichard; Attendance: 22,838; Referee: Florent Batta

23 November 2018 14	Lyon	1–0	Saint-Étienne	Décines-Charpieu
20:45 CET (UTC+1)	Denayer (yellow card) 42', (goal) 62'; Rafael (red card) 72'	Report	Monnet-Paquet (yellow card) 39'; Kolodziejczak (yellow card) 89'	Stadium: Parc Olympique Lyonnais; Attendance: 55,701; Referee: Antony Gautier

30 November 2018 15	Saint-Étienne	3–0	Nantes	Nantes
20:45 CET (UTC+1)	Cabella (yellow card) 60'; Berić 72'; Khazri 84'; Kolodziejczak 90'	Report	Pallois (yellow card) 20'; Lucas Lima (yellow card) 82'	Stadium: Stade de la Beaujoire; Attendance: 21,884; Referee: Jérôme Brisard

5 December 2018 16	Bordeaux	3–2	Saint-Étienne	Bordeaux
19:00 CET (UTC+1)	Briand 22'; Kamano 57' (pen.); Sankharé (yellow card) 75'; Sabaly (yellow card) 83'; Pablo 90'	Report	Diony 16'; Khazri (yellow card) 65', (goal) 67'; Saliba (yellow card) 56'; Selnæs (yellow card) 75'	Stadium: Matmut Atlantique; Attendance: 23,375; Referee: Clément Turpin

9 December 2018 17	Saint-Étienne	Postponed	Marseille	Nantes
				Stadium: Stade de la Beaujoire

16 December 2018 18	Nice	1–1	Saint-Étienne	Nice
17:00 CET (UTC+1)	Attal (yellow card) 45+1'; Hérelle (yellow card) 30' (yellow-red card) 58'; Cyprien 81' (pen.)	Report	Salibur (yellow card) 34' (yellow-red card) 51'; Selnæs (yellow card) 51'; Diony 54'	Stadium: Allianz Riviera; Attendance: 19,250; Referee: Thomas Leonard

22 December 2018 19	Saint-Étienne	3–0	Dijon	Nantes
21:00 CET (UTC+1)	Monnet-Paquet 43'; Polomat (yellow card) 45+1'; Kolodziejczak (yellow card) 52'; M'Vila (yellow card) 55'; Khazri 64'; Berić 83'; Selnæs (yellow card) 89'	Report	Marié (yellow card) 19'; Saïd (yellow card) 82'; Balmont (yellow card) 89'	Stadium: Stade de la Beaujoire; Attendance: 26,215; Referee: Eric Wattellier

12 January 2019 20	Guingamp	0–1	Saint-Étienne	Guingamp
20:00 CET (UTC+1)		Report	Khazri 7', (yellow card) 56'	Stadium: Stade de Roudourou; Attendance: 15,342; Referee: Karim Abed

16 January 2019 17	Saint-Étienne	2–1	Marseille	Nantes
21:00 CET (UTC+1)	Khazri 59' (pen.), 88'	Report	Strootman 16'	Stadium: Stade de la Beaujoire; Attendance: 28,146; Referee: Antony Gautier

20 January 2019 21	Saint-Étienne	1–2	Lyon	Saint-Étienne
21:00 CET (UTC+1)	Hamouma 21'; Monnet-Paquet (yellow card) 43'; Perrin (yellow card) 65'	Report	Marcelo (yellow card) 20'; Fekir 65' (pen.); Tete (yellow card) 71'; Dembélé 90+5'	Stadium: Stade Geoffroy-Guichard; Attendance: 41,594; Referee: Benoît Bastien

30 January 2019 22	Nantes	1–1	Saint-Étienne	Nantes
21:00 CET (UTC+1)	Diego (yellow card) 45'; Fábio (red card) 45+3'; Waris 70'; Coulibaly (yellow card) 82'	Report	Monnet-Paquet (yellow card) 30'; M'Vila (red card) 45+3'; Cabella 58'	Stadium: Stade de la Beaujoire; Attendance: 28,748; Referee: Frank Schneider

3 February 2019 23	Saint-Étienne	Postponed	Strasbourg	Saint-Étienne
17:00 CET (UTC+1)		Report		Stadium: Stade Geoffroy-Guichard

10 February 2019 24	Rennes	3–0	Saint-Étienne	Rennes
17:00 CET (UTC+1)	Niang 21'; Ben Arfa 87' (pen.); Hunou 90+1'	Report	Hamouma (yellow card) 57' (yellow-red card) 90+3'; Subotić (yellow card) 66'; Perrin (yellow card) 86'	Stadium: Roazhon Park; Attendance: 24,230; Referee: Johan Hamel

13 February 2019 23	Saint-Étienne	2–1	Strasbourg	Saint-Étienne
19:00 CET (UTC+1)	Berić 4'; Perrin 27'	Report	Da Costa (yellow card) 14', (goal) 73'; Aaneba (yellow card) 39'; Thomasson (yellow card) 60'; Gonçalves (yellow card) 78'; Martinez (yellow card) 83'	Stadium: Stade Geoffroy-Guichard; Attendance: 16,406; Referee: Jérôme Brisard
Note: Rescheduled from 3 February 2019.

17 February 2019 25	Saint-Étienne	0–1	Paris Saint-Germain	Saint-Étienne
21:00 CET (UTC+1)	Khazri (yellow card) 43'	Report	Bernat (yellow card) 49'; Alves (yellow card) 59'; Mbappé 73', (yellow card) 90+5'; Areola (yellow card) 90'; Kurzawa (yellow card) 90+3'	Stadium: Stade Geoffroy-Guichard; Attendance: 39,652; Referee: Benoît Bastien

22 February 2019 26	Dijon	0–1	Saint-Étienne	Dijon
19:00 CET (UTC+1)		Report	Subotić 64'	Stadium: Stade Gaston Gérard; Attendance: 13,511; Referee: Karim Abed

3 March 2019 27	Marseille	2–0	Saint-Étienne	Marseille
21:00 CET (UTC+1)	Sakai (yellow card) 5'; Balotelli 12'; Thauvin 21' (pen.); Sarr (yellow card) 25'	Report	Debuchy (yellow card) 19'; Khazri (yellow card) 85'	Stadium: Stade Vélodrome; Attendance: 57,337; Referee: Clément Turpin

10 March 2019 28	Saint-Étienne	0–1	Lille	Saint-Étienne
15:00 CET (UTC+1)	M'Vila (yellow card) 52'; Debuchy (yellow card) 62' (yellow-red card) 90+1'; Kolodziejczak (yellow card) 70'; Khazri (red card) 90+4'	Report	Xeka (yellow card) 59'; Bamba (yellow card) 79'; Pépé 87'; Ikoné (yellow card) 90+1'	Stadium: Stade Geoffroy-Guichard; Attendance: 26,648; Referee: Mikael Lesage

16 March 2019 29	Caen	0–5	Saint-Étienne	Caen
20:00 CET (UTC+1)		Report	Hamouma 4'; Berić 20'; Nordin 30'; Ghezali 85'; Vada 90+1'	Stadium: Stade Michel d'Ornano; Attendance: 18,276; Referee: Florent Batta

1 April 2019 30	Saint-Étienne	2–1	Nîmes	Saint-Étienne
20:30 CEST (UTC+2)	Debuchy (yellow card) 6'; Cabella 24'; Berić 79'; Ghezali (yellow card) 85'; M'Vila (yellow card) 90+1'	Report	Bobichon 2', (yellow card) 90+1'; Ferri (yellow card) 24'; Paquiez (yellow card) 56'; Briançon (yellow card) 82'	Stadium: Stade Geoffroy-Guichard; Attendance: 22,595; Referee: Karim Abed

6 April 2019 31	Amiens	2–2	Saint-Étienne	Amiens
20:00 CEST (UTC+2)	Konaté 24', 61'; Lefort (red card) 32'; Gurtner (yellow card) 90+5'; Gouano (yellow card) 90+5'	Report	Subotić (yellow card) 1'; Kolodziejczak 16', (yellow card) 57'; Cabella 90+5'	Stadium: Stade de la Licorne; Attendance: 11,832; Referee: Eric Wattellier

14 April 2019 32	Saint-Étienne	3–0	Bordeaux	Saint-Étienne
17:00 CEST (UTC+2)	Kolodziejczak (yellow card) 3'; Cabella (yellow card) 46'; Khazri 56' (pen.); Debuchy 74', 90'	Report		Stadium: Stade Geoffroy-Guichard; Attendance: 33,935; Referee: Ruddy Buquet

21 April 2019 33	Reims	0–2	Saint-Étienne	Reims
17:00 CEST (UTC+2)	Foket (yellow card) 61'; Chavalerin (yellow card) 79'; Cafaro (yellow card) 90+2'	Report	Cabella 25'; Engels 51' (o.g.)	Stadium: Stade Auguste Delaune; Attendance: 19,102; Referee: Amaury Delerue

28 April 2019 34	Saint-Étienne	2–0	Toulouse	Saint-Étienne
17:00 CEST (UTC+2)	Berić 2', 10'; Debuchy (yellow card) 68'	Report	Sangaré (yellow card) 47'; Sylla (yellow card) 83'	Stadium: Stade Geoffroy-Guichard; Attendance: 28,203; Referee: Jérémy Stinat

5 May 2019 35	Monaco	2–3	Saint-Étienne	Monaco
17:00 CEST (UTC+2)	Martins 18'; Ballo-Touré (yellow card) 31'; Golovin (yellow card) 40'; Silva (yellow card) 82'; Vinícius 90+2'	Report	Khazri (yellow card) 35'; Debuchy (yellow card) 41'; Hamouma (yellow card) 45'; Vada (yellow card) 51'; Ballo-Touré 59' (o.g.); Cabella 71'; Nordin 80'; Polomat (yellow card) 90+3'	Stadium: Stade Louis II; Attendance: 9,047; Referee: Benoît Millot

10 May 2019 36	Saint-Étienne	0–1	Montpellier	Saint-Étienne
20:45 CEST (UTC+2)	Cabella (yellow card) 51' (yellow-red card) 62'; Nordin (yellow card) 56'	Report	Mollet (yellow card) 42'; Suárez (yellow card) 45+1'; Congré (red card) 53'; Skhiri (yellow card) 53'; Lecomte (yellow card) 55'; Laborde 64'	Stadium: Stade Geoffroy-Guichard; Attendance: 35,644; Referee: Benoît Bastien

18 May 2019 37	Saint-Étienne	3–0	Nice	Saint-Étienne
21:00 CEST (UTC+2)	Berić 26', 65'; Hamouma 81'	Report	Coly (yellow card) 62'; Lees-Melou (yellow card) 73'; Le Bihan (yellow card) 86'	Stadium: Stade Geoffroy-Guichard; Attendance: 36,759; Referee: Antony Gautier

24 May 2019 38	Angers	1–1	Saint-Étienne	Angers
21:05 CEST (UTC+2)	Moulin 70' (o.g.); El Melali (yellow card) 89'	Report	Nordin 64'; Kolodziejczak (yellow card) 71'	Stadium: Stade Raymond Kopa; Attendance: 16,011; Referee: Johan Hamel

=== Coupe de France ===
6 January 2019 Round of 64	Olympique Strasbourg	0–6	Saint-Étienne	Strasbourg
17:15 CET (UTC+1)	Sidow (yellow card) 6'	Report	Cabella 3', 85'; Perrin 9'; Khazri 46'; Diony 56'; Rocha Santos 83'	Stadium: Stade de la Meinau; Attendance: 6,525; Referee: Stéphanie Frappart

23 January 2019 Round of 32	Saint-Étienne	3–6	Dijon	Saint-Étienne
18:30 CET (UTC+1)	Diony 14'; Ruffier (yellow card) 50'; Khazri (yellow card) 58'; Berić 60'; Monnet-Paquet 64'	Report	Sliti 11', 28', 50' (pen.); Keita 47'; Tavares 52'; Alphonse (yellow card) 84'; Marié 90+2'	Stadium: Stade Geoffroy-Guichard; Attendance: 8,193; Referee: François Letexier

=== Coupe de la Ligue ===
27 November 2018 Round of 32	Nîmes	1–1 (4–2 p)	Saint-Étienne	Nîmes
19:00 CET (UTC+1)	Hsissane (yellow card) 23'; Bouanga 90'	Report	Dioussé (yellow card) 5'; Khazri (yellow card) 72'; Berić 81'	Stadium: Stade des Costières; Attendance: 6,260; Referee: Mikael Lesage
	Penalties
	Savanier (penalty scored); Bobichon (penalty missed); Bouanga (penalty scored); Alioui (penalty scored); Bozok (penalty scored)		(penalty missed) Khazri; (penalty missed) M'Vila; (penalty scored) Salibur; (penalty scored) Polomat

== Statistics ==
=== Appearances and goals ===
No.	Pos	Nat	Player	Total		Ligue 1		Coupe de la Ligue		Coupe de France	
No.	Pos	Nat	Player	Apps	Goals	Apps	Goals	Apps	Goals	Apps	Goals
Goalkeepers
1	GK	(France) FRA	Théo Vermot	0	0	0	0	0	0	0	0
16	GK	(France) FRA	Stéphane Ruffier	40	0	37	0	1	0	2	0
30	GK	(France) FRA	Jessy Moulin	1	0	1	0	0	0	0	0
50	GK	(France) FRA	Stefan Bajic	0	0	0	0	0	0	0	0
Defenders
3	DF	(France) FRA	Pierre-Yves Polomat	21	0	11+7	0	1	0	2	0
4	DF	(France) FRA	William Saliba	19	0	13+3	0	1	0	2	0
5	DF	(France) FRA	Timothée Kolodziejczak	38	3	35+1	3	0	0	2	0
11	DF	(Brazil) BRA	Gabriel Silva	19	0	16+3	0	0	0	0	0
24	DF	(France) FRA	Loïc Perrin	32	2	31	1	0	0	1	1
26	DF	(France) FRA	Mathieu Debuchy	24	4	23+1	4	0	0	0	0
28	DF	(Serbia) SRB	Neven Subotić	28	1	26	1	1	0	1	0
33	DF	(France) FRA	Mickaël Panos	2	0	0+2	0	0	0	0	0
32	DF	(France) FRA	Wesley Fofana	2	0	1+1	0	0	0	0	0
Midfielders
6	MF	(France) FRA	Yann M'Vila	40	0	37	0	1	0	2	0
8	MF	(Morocco) MAR	Youssef Aït Bennasser	13	0	11+2	0	0	0	0	0
23	MF	(Argentina) ARG	Valentín Vada	12	1	3+9	1	0	0	0	0
16	MF	(France) FRA	Dylan Chambost	1	0	0	0	0	0	0+1	0
32	MF	(Cape Verde) CPV	Kenny Rocha	2	1	0+1	0	0	0	0+1	1
Forwards
7	FW	(France) FRA	Rémy Cabella	37	10	34	8	0+1	0	2	2
9	FW	(France) FRA	Loïs Diony	32	7	19+11	5	0	0	2	2
10	FW	(Tunisia) TUN	Wahbi Khazri	35	14	32	13	0+1	0	1+1	1
13	FW	(Senegal) SEN	Makhtar Gueye	5	1	0+5	1	0	0	0	0
18	FW	(France) FRA	Arnaud Nordin	27	3	11+14	3	1	0	1	0
19	FW	(France) FRA	Yannis Salibur	23	1	9+12	1	1	0	1	0
21	FW	(France) FRA	Romain Hamouma	29	4	19+8	4	1	0	0+1	0
22	FW	(France) FRA	Kévin Monnet-Paquet	26	1	16+7	0	1	0	1+1	1
27	FW	(Slovenia) SLO	Robert Berić	26	11	12+11	9	1	1	1+1	1
31	FW	(France) FRA	Lamine Ghezali	5	1	0+5	1	0	0	0	0
33	FW	(France) FRA	Charles Abi	3	0	0+3	0	0	0	0	0
Players transferred out during the season
8	MF	(France) FRA	Mahdi Camara	1	0	0+1	0	0	0	0	0
12	DF	(Senegal) SEN	Cheikh M'Bengue	0	0	0	0	0	0	0	0
17	MF	(Norway) NOR	Ole Selnæs	21	0	19+1	0	0+1	0	0	0
25	MF	(Senegal) SEN	Assane Dioussé	10	0	2+5	0	1	0	1+1	0
—	FW	(France) FRA	Franck Honorat	0	0	0	0	0	0	0	0

Last updated: 24 May 2019
Source: Competitions
