= Adel Lembezat =

French footballer

Personal information
- Date of birth: 2 September 1998 (age 28)
- Place of birth: Pau, France
- Height: 1.77 m (5 ft 10 in)
- Position: Attacking midfielder

Team information
- Current team: Dijon FCO
- Number: 17

Youth career
- 2004–2009: Union Jurançon
- 2009–2011: Pau FC
- 2011–2017: Toulouse FC

Senior career*
Years	Team	Apps	(Gls)
2017–2018	Toulouse B	7	(0)
2019–2020	US Lège-Cap-Ferret	18	(2)
2020–2022	Trélissac	41	(4)
2022–2023	Le Puy	25	(2)
2024–2024	Pau B	9	(5)
2024–2024	Pau FC	2	(0)
2024–	Dijon FCO B	3	(0)
2024–	Dijon FCO	40	(4)
- * Club domestic league appearances and goals as of 22 June 2026

Adel Lembezat (born 2 September 1998) is a French-Moroccan footballer who plays as a midfielder for Ligue 2 club Dijon FCO.

== Career ==
=== Early career ===
Adel Lembezat began his football journey at a young age in his hometown of Jurançon, France. His talent was evident early on, and at the age of 11, he joined the youth ranks of Pau FC. Lembezat's performances at Pau FC caught the eye of scouts, leading to his enrollment in the youth academy of Toulouse FC.

=== Career ===
In 2017, Lembezat made his debut with Toulouse FC's reserve team, showcasing his talent and potential on the professional stage. Seeking more playing time to further develop his skills, he moved to Lège-Cap-Ferret in Championnat National 3 in 2019, aiming to hone his craft. Lembezat's determination and hard work paid off as he progressed to Trélissac in Championnat National 2, where he continued to impress with his performances on the field. After two successful years, Lembezat made the leap to Le Puy in Championnat National, France's third division, where he quickly established himself as a standout player. His consistent performances caught the attention of scouts, and he harbored hopes of securing a professional contract. Despite facing setbacks, including a period without a club, Lembezat remained resilient and determined to pursue his dreams. Returning to his boyhood club, Pau FC, he showcased his skills in the reserve team before earning an opportunity to prove himself in Ligue 2 under the guidance of coach Nicolas Usaï, who recognized Lembezat's potential and included him in the plans for the upcoming season. He made his debut during the 2023-24 Ligue 2 season against Angers SCO.

Lembezat signed for Dijon FCO in 2024.
