= Mattéo Nkurunziza =

Burundian footballer (born 2004)

Personal information
- Date of birth: 2 June 2004 (age 22)
- Place of birth: Rixensart, Belgium
- Height: 1.95 m (6 ft 5 in)
- Position: Goalkeeper

Team information
- Current team: Dender EH
- Number: 13

Youth career
- 2018–2020: Royale Union Rixensartoise
- 2020–2021: R.W.D. Molenbeek

Senior career*
Years	Team	Apps	(Gls)
2021–2026	R.W.D. Molenbeek	0	(0)
2026–	Dender EH	0	(0)

International career^{‡}
2024–	Burundi	2	(0)
- * Club domestic league appearances and goals as of 20 September 2026 ‡ National team caps and goals as of 02:55, 27 August 2024 (UTC)

Mattéo Nkurunziza (born 2 June 2004) is a professional footballer who plays as a goalkeeper for the Challenger Pro League club Dender EH. Born in Belgium, he plays for the Burundi national team.

== Career ==
Nkurunziza began playing youth football with his local club Royale Union Rixensartoise at the age of 14, where he played as a forward before converting to a goalkeeper. He moved to R.W.D. Molenbeek in 2020, and on 14 September 2021 signed his first professional contract with the club until 2023. He played for RWDM's youth teams, but was a part of their senior team as a substitute goalkeeper. On 17 July 2024, he extended his contract with RWDM until 2026.

== International career ==
Born in Belgium, Nkurunziza is of Burundian descent. He debuted for the Burundi national team in a friendly 1–0 loss to Madagascar on 22 March 2024.
