= Kenny Rocha =

Cape Verdean footballer (born 2000)

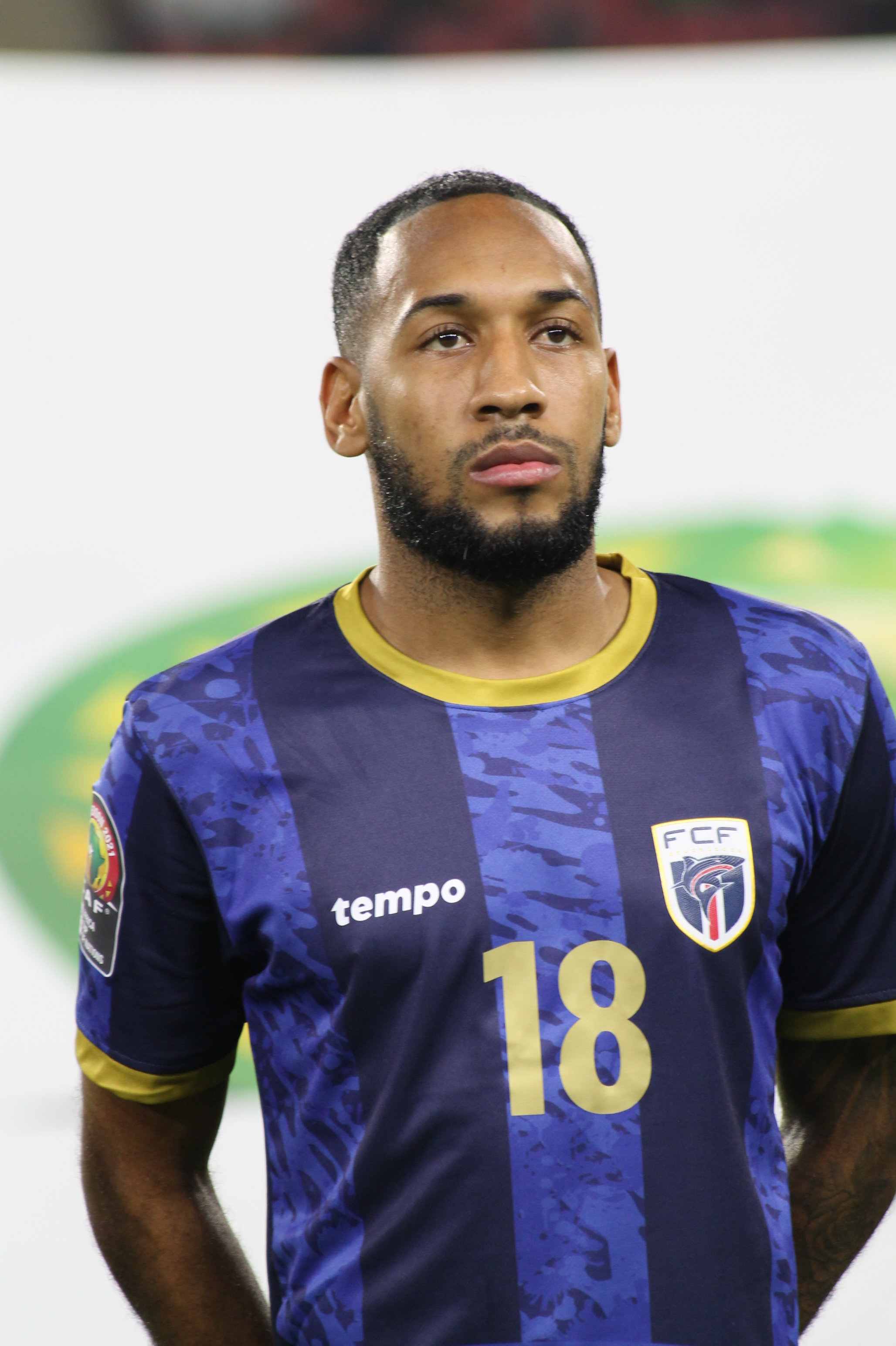
- Rocha with Cape Verde in 2022

Personal information
- Full name: Kenny Rocha Santos
- Date of birth: 3 January 2000 (age 26)
- Place of birth: São Vicente, Cape Verde
- Height: 1.74 m (5 ft 9 in)
- Position: Midfielder

Youth career
- –2017: Saint-Étienne

Senior career*
Years	Team	Apps	(Gls)
2016–2019	Saint-Étienne II	48	(4)
2017–2019	Saint-Étienne	4	(0)
2019–2021	Nancy	61	(6)
2021–2023	Oostende	48	(1)
2023–2024	AEZ Zakakiou	27	(1)
2024–2025	Paris 13 Atletico	23	(4)
2025–2026	Rouen	32	(10)

International career^{‡}
2017–	Cape Verde	23	(1)
- * Club domestic league appearances and goals as of 16 May 2026 ‡ National team caps and goals as of 31 July 2020

Kenny Rocha Santos (born 3 January 2000) is a Cape Verdean professional footballer who plays as a midfielder.

== Club career ==
=== Saint-Étienne ===
Rocha made his debut for Saint-Étienne on 1 February 2017 against Auxerre, replacing Kévin Monnet-Paquet in the 78th minute of a 3–0 away loss in the Coupe de France.

=== Nancy ===
In July 2019, Rocha signed for Nancy. He made his debut for the club in a 1–1 draw against Valenciennes on 2 August. His first goal came in a 2–1 away loss to Caen on 7 November 2020.

== International career ==
Rocha was named to Cape Verde's squad for the 2021 Africa Cup of Nations, where the team reached the round of 16.

== Career statistics ==
=== Club ===
As of match played 31 August 2022

Appearances and goals by club, season and competition
Club	Season	League			National cup		League cup		Other		Total	
Club	Season	Division	Apps	Goals	Apps	Goals	Apps	Goals	Apps	Goals	Apps	Goals
Saint-Étienne II	2016–17	CFA 2	11	0	—		—		—		11	0
Saint-Étienne II	2017–18	National 3	18	0	—		—		—		18	0
Saint-Étienne II	2018–19	National 2	19	4	—		—		—		19	4
Saint-Étienne II	Total		48	4	0	0	0	0	0	0	48	4
Saint-Étienne	2016–17	Ligue 1	3	0	1	0	0	0	0	0	4	0
Saint-Étienne	2017–18	Ligue 1	0	0	0	0	0	0	—		0	0
Saint-Étienne	2018–19	Ligue 1	1	0	1	1	0	0	—		2	1
Saint-Étienne	Total		4	0	2	1	0	0	0	0	6	1
Nancy	2019–20	Ligue 2	26	0	1	0	3	0	—		30	0
Nancy	2020–21	Ligue 2	19	3	0	0	—		—		19	3
Nancy	Total		45	3	1	0	3	0	0	0	49	3
Oostende	2021–22	Belgian First Division A	27	1	2	0	—		—		29	1
Oostende	2022–23	Belgian First Division A	6	0	0	0	—		—		6	0
Oostende	Total		33	1	2	0	—		—		35	1
Career total			130	8	5	1	3	0	0	0	138	9

=== International ===
As of matches played on 31 March 2022

Appearances and goals by national team and year
National team	Year	Apps	Goals
Cape Verde	2017	1	0
Cape Verde	2018	1	0
Cape Verde	2019	1	0
Cape Verde	2020	1	0
Cape Verde	2021	7	0
Cape Verde	2022	7	1
Total		18	1
