= Vinni Triboulet =

French footballer (born 1999)

Personal information
- Full name: Vinni Dugary Triboulet
- Date of birth: 18 June 1999 (age 27)
- Place of birth: Douala, Cameroon
- Height: 1.84 m (6 ft 0 in)
- Position: Forward

Team information
- Current team: Meizhou Hakka
- Number: 10

Senior career*
| Years | Team | Apps | (Gls) |
| 2016–2022 | Nancy B | 48 | (8) |
| 2018–2022 | Nancy | 59 | (7) |
| 2019–2020 | → Virton (loan) | 1 | (0) |
| 2022–2024 | Beroe | 45 | (11) |
| 2024 | Botev Plovdiv II | 1 | (0) |
| 2024–2025 | Botev Plovdiv | 26 | (5) |
| 2026– | Meizhou Hakka | 0 | (0) |
- * Club domestic league appearances and goals as of 13 July 2025

Vinni Dugary Triboulet (born 18 June 1999) is a Cameroonian professional footballer who plays as a forward for China League One club Meizhou Hakka.

== Club career ==
Triboulet made his professional debut with Nancy in a 2–1 Ligue 2 win over Orléans on 30 November 2018, and scored the game's first goal in his debut. In October 2022, he signed a contract with Bulgarian team Beroe Stara Zagora. In August 2024, Triboulet joined Botev Plovdiv, another club from the same country, as a temporary replacement for the injured forward Anthony Ujah.
