= Grégoire Lefebvre =

French footballer (born 1994)

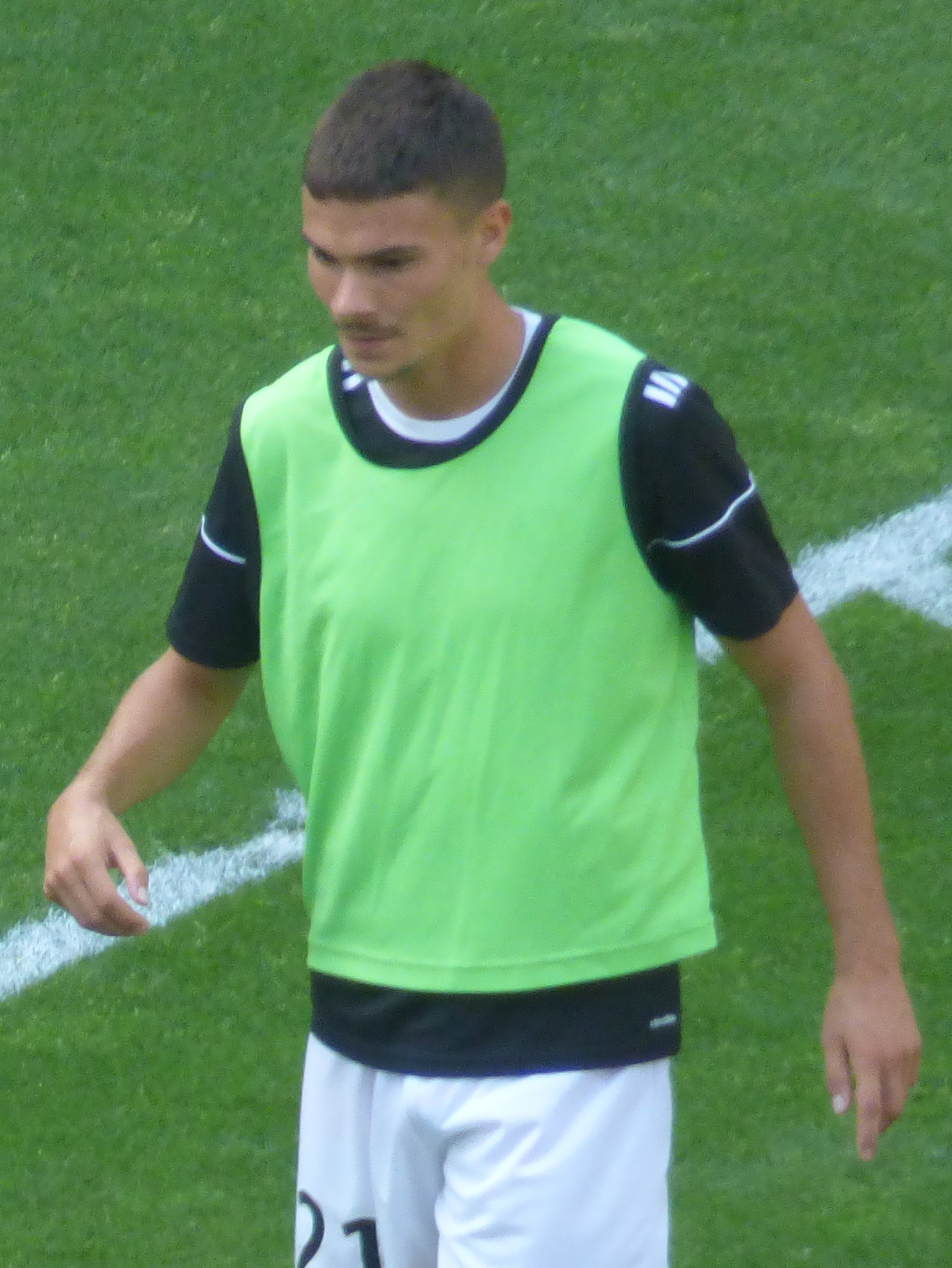
- Lefebvre in 2018

Personal information
- Date of birth: 13 May 1994 (age 32)
- Place of birth: Mont-Saint-Aignan, France
- Height: 1.72 m (5 ft 8 in)
- Position: Midfielder

Team information
- Current team: Fleury
- Number: 6

Youth career
- –2013: Auxerre

Senior career*
| Years | Team | Apps | (Gls) |
| 2013–2016 | Auxerre | 59 | (1) |
| 2016–2019 | Red Star | 72 | (3) |
| 2019–2022 | Nancy | 70 | (0) |
| 2020 | Nancy II | 2 | (0) |
| 2022–2024 | Versailles | 53 | (1) |
| 2024– | Fleury | 56 | (0) |
- * Club domestic league appearances and goals as of 23 June 2026

Grégoire Lefebvre (born 13 May 1994) is a French professional footballer who plays as a midfielder for Ligue 3 club Fleury.

== Career ==
Lefebvre is a youth exponent from AJ Auxerre. He made his Ligue 2 debut on 13 December 2013 against Niort in a 2–0 home win. He managed to play 12 league games in his first season.

=== Versailles (2022-2024) ===
In June 2022, Lefebvre moved to Versailles.

=== Fleury (2024-) ===
In 2024, he joined Fleury.
