= Ousmane Cissokho =

Senegalese footballer (born 1987)

Personal information
- Full name: Mame Ousmane Cissokho
- Date of birth: 14 January 1987 (age 39)
- Place of birth: Saint-Louis, Senegal
- Height: 1.75 m (5 ft 9 in)
- Position: Left winger

Youth career
- 2003–2008: Auxerre

Senior career*
Years	Team	Apps	(Gls)
2008–2011	Auxerre	0	(0)
2011–2012	Apollon Limassol	26	(2)
2012–2013	Rouen	29	(7)
2013–2017	Nîmes	86	(10)
2017–2019	Orléans	58	(11)
2019–2021	Nancy	47	(2)
- * Club domestic league appearances and goals as of 12:08, 22 August 2021 (UTC)

Mame Ousmane Cissokho (born 14 January 1987) is a Senegalese professional footballer who most recently played as a left winger for French club AS Nancy.
