= Stade Marcel Picot =

Stadium in Tomblaine, France

Stade Marcel-Picot
- Interactive map of Stade Marcel-Picot
- Former names: Stade du Parc des Sports du Pont d’Essey (1926–1963)
- Location: 90, Boulevard Jean-Jaurès, 54510 Tomblaine
- Coordinates: 48°41′44″N 6°12′38″E
- Owner: Communauté Urbaine du Grand Nancy
- Capacity: 20,087
- Surface: GrassMaster hybrid grass
- Field size: 105 m x 68 m

Construction
- Opened: August 8, 1926; 100 years ago
- Renovated: 1999–2003
- Architects: Gérard Bernt, Francis Morillon, Philippe Thouveny and Alynia Architecten, the Netherlands (1999–2003)

Tenant
- Nancy

The Stade Marcel Picot is a stadium located in Tomblaine, France, near the city of Nancy. Built in 1926, it is used by Ligue 2 football team Nancy.

The stadium was completely rebuilt and inaugurated in its new configuration in 2003. It is now able to hold 20,087 people.

Since summer 2010, Marcel-Picot is one of very few French stadiums equipped with artificial turf.

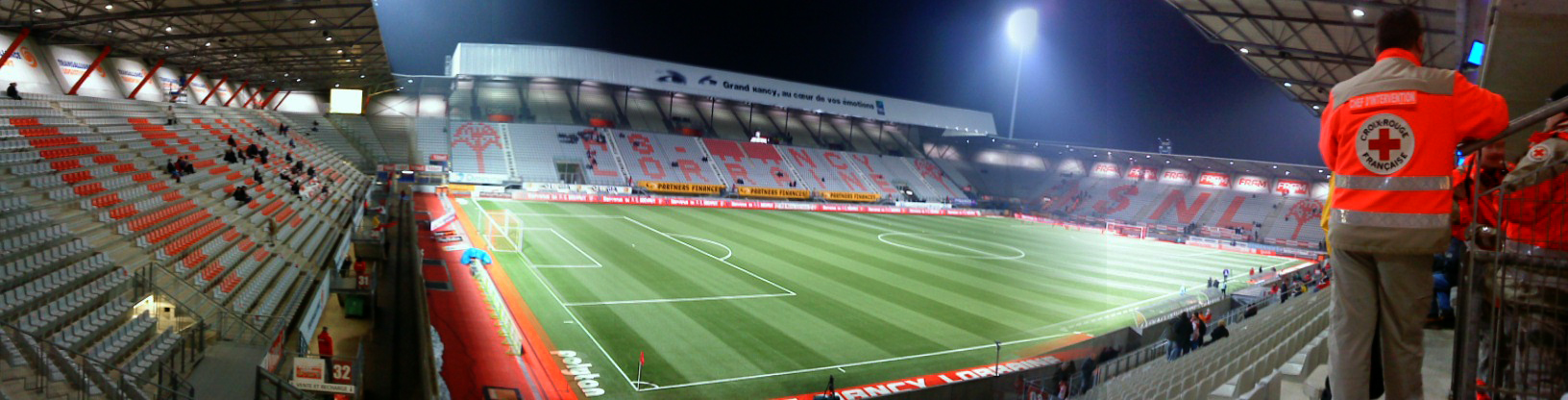
Panoramic view (December 2010)

== Gallery ==
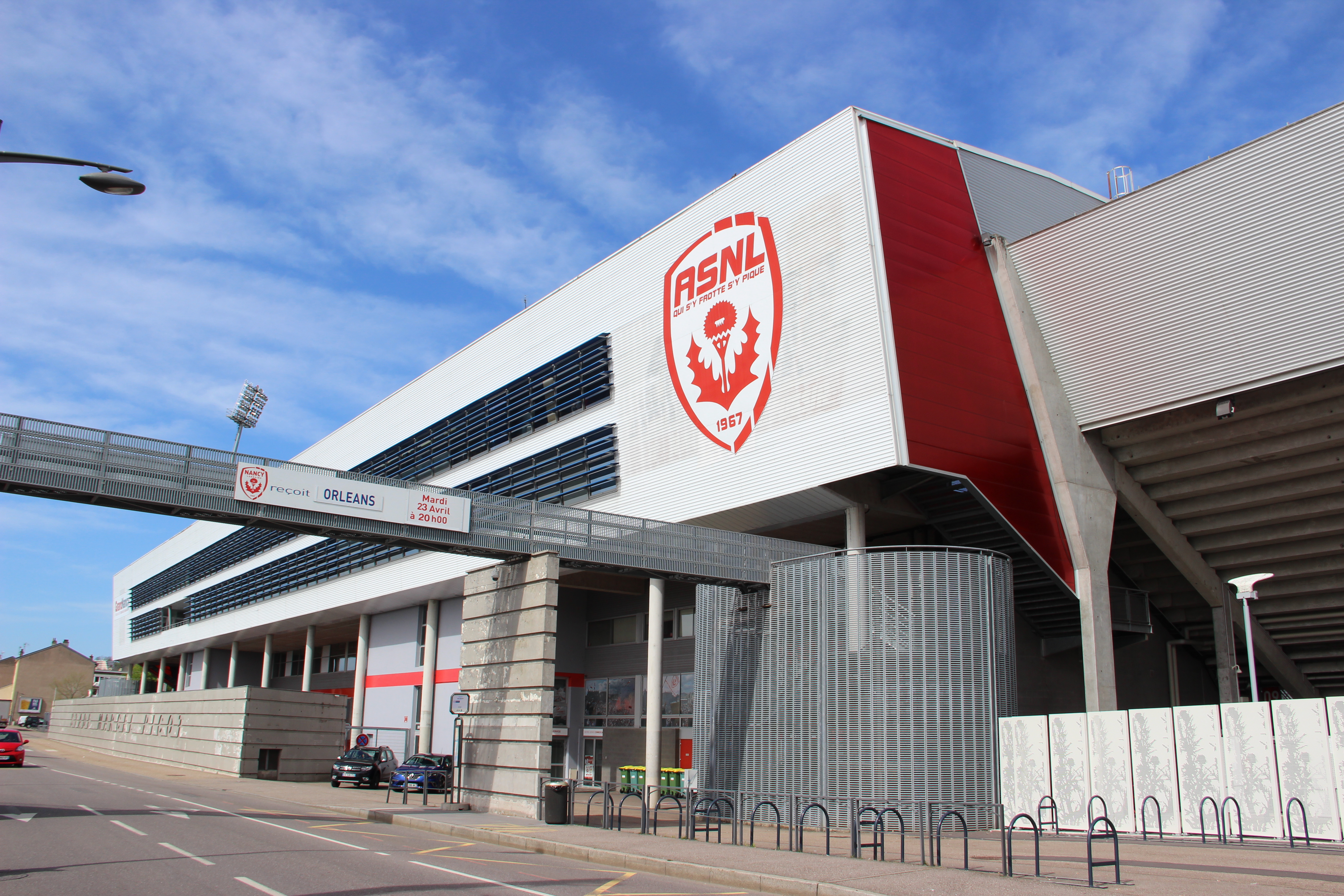

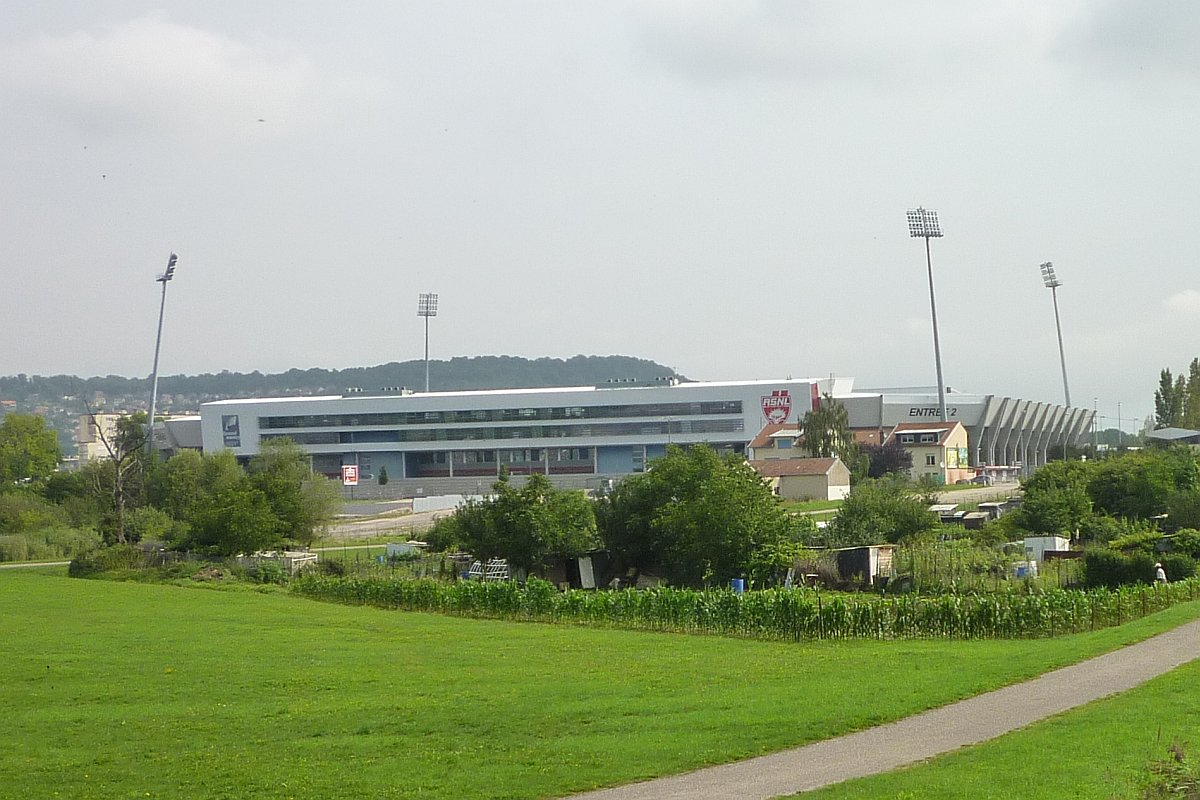

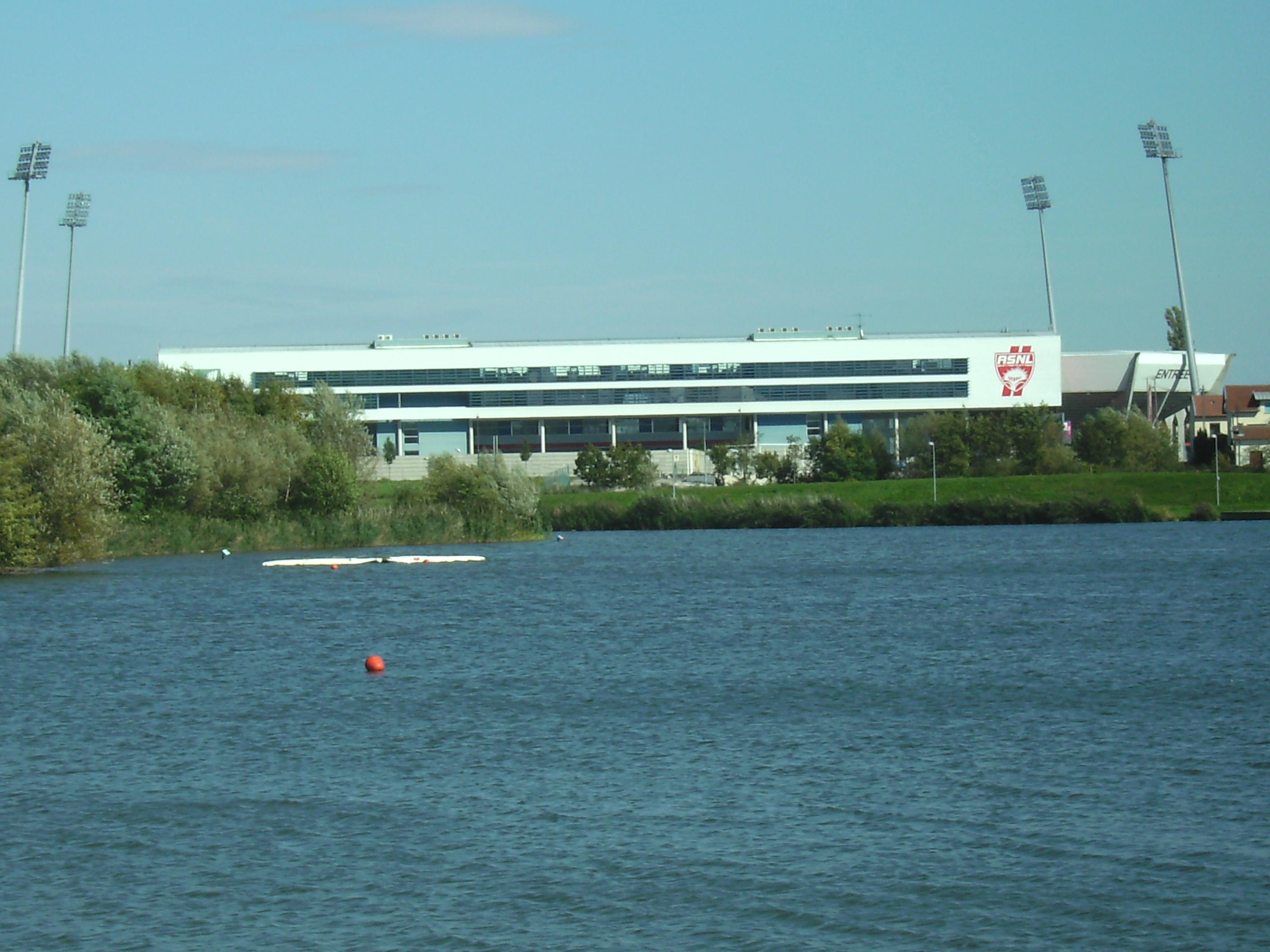

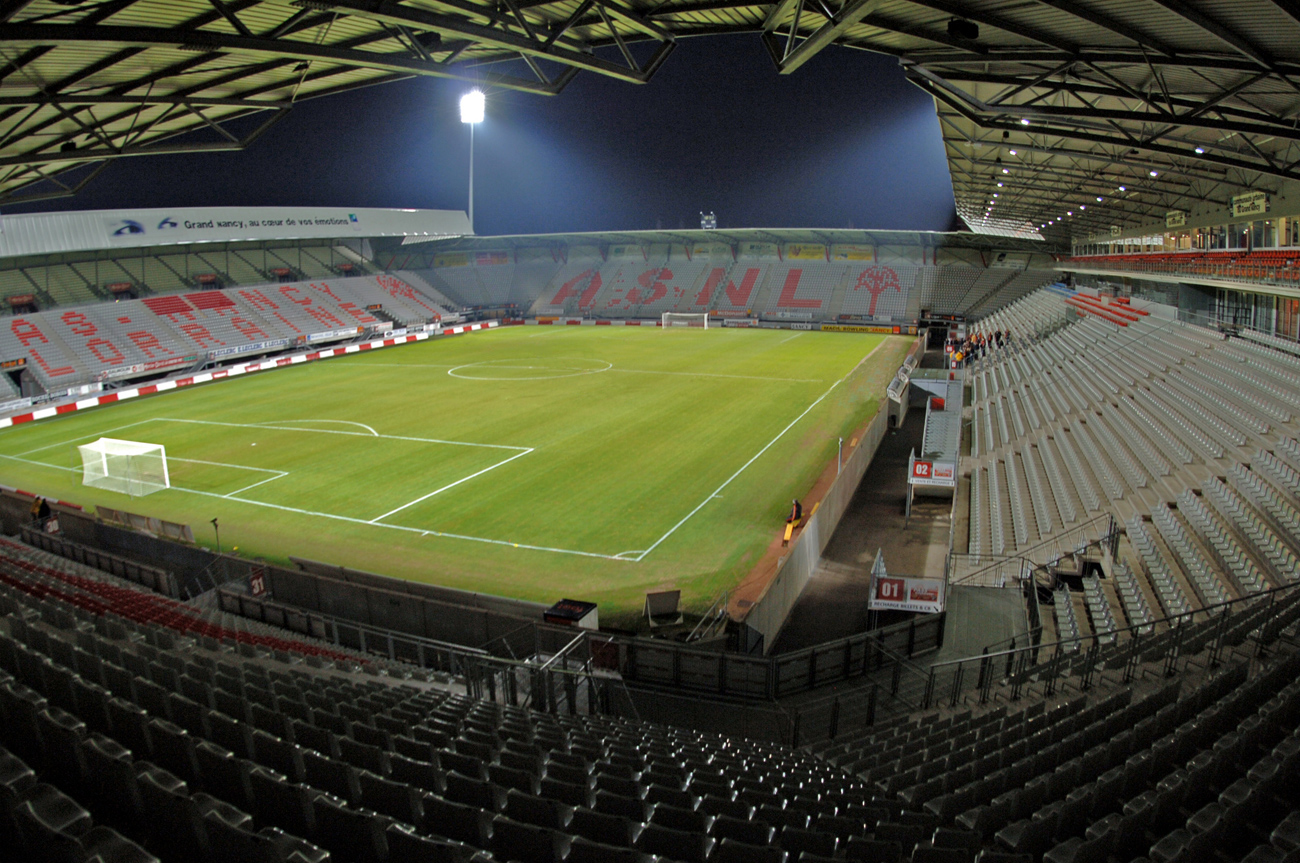

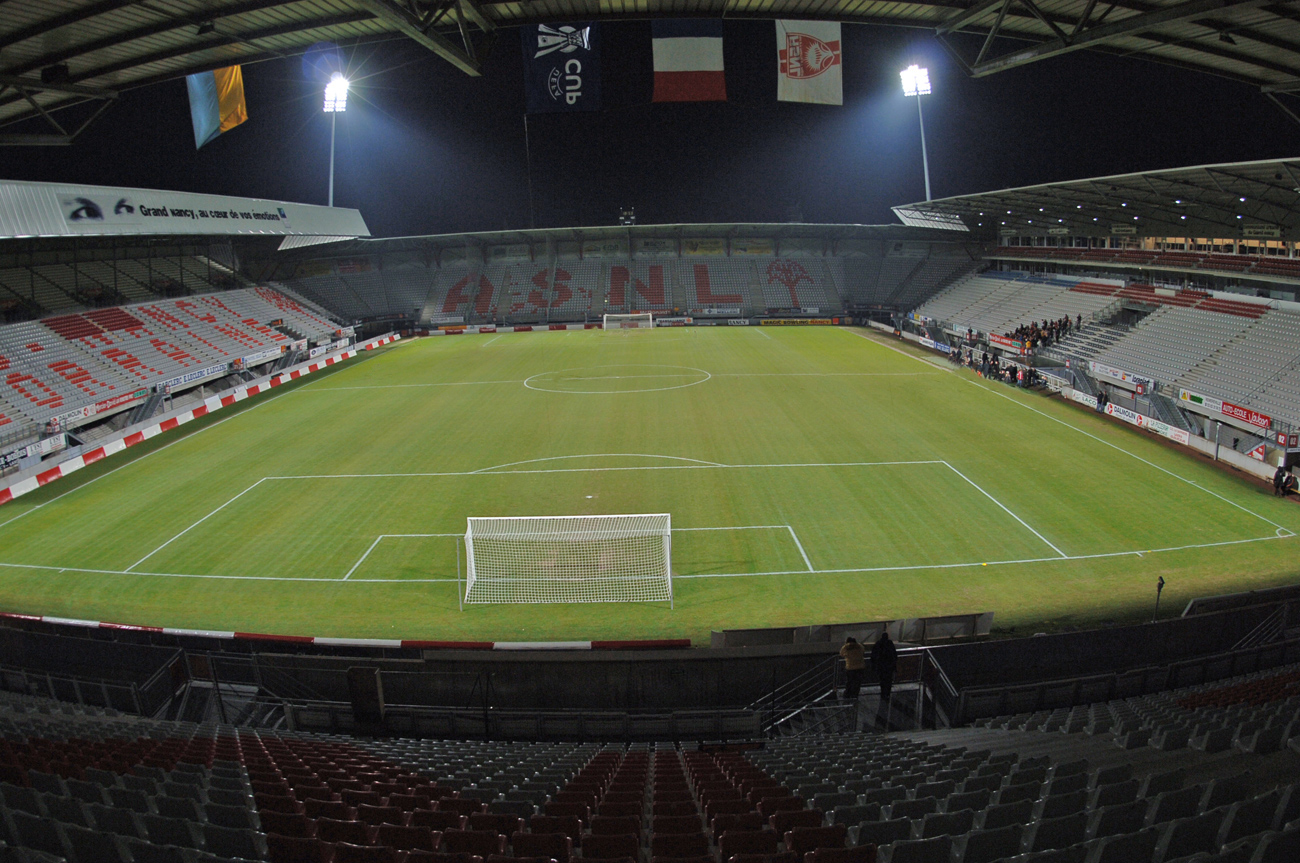

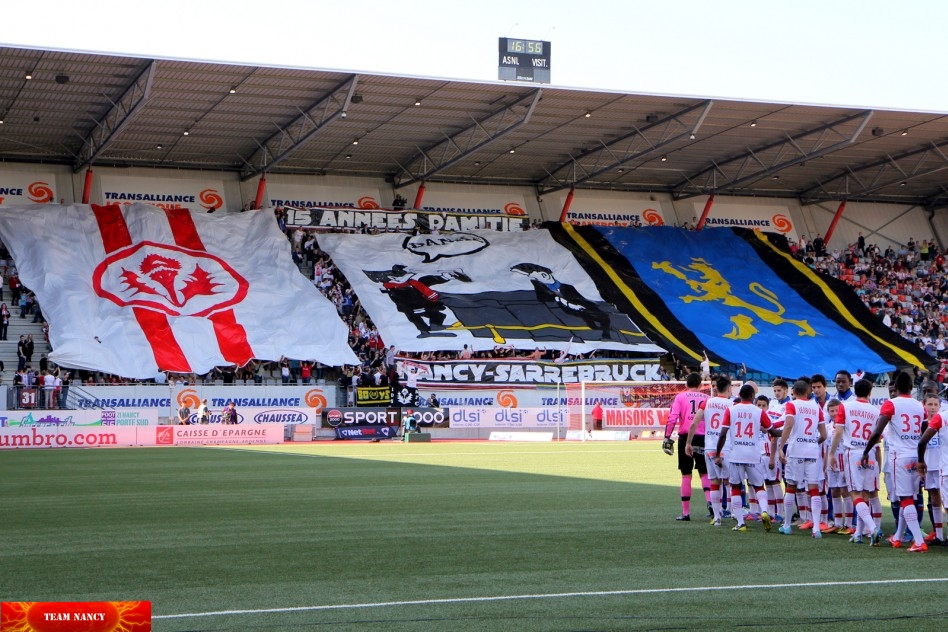

== See also ==
- List of football stadiums in France
- Lists of stadiums
