= Edmond Akichi =

Ivorian professional footballer

Ogou Akichi
Personal information
- Full name: Ogou Edmond Akichi
- Date of birth: 24 April 1990 (age 36)
- Place of birth: Abidjan, Ivory Coast
- Height: 1.78 m (5 ft 10 in)
- Position: Midfielder

Team information
- Current team: Nyon
- Number: 42

Youth career
- 2010–2011: AFAD
- 2011: Auxerre

Senior career*
Years	Team	Apps	(Gls)
2011–2013	Auxerre II	40	(2)
2013–2015	Roye-Noyon	54	(6)
2015–2016	AC Amiens	21	(0)
2016–2017	Béziers	32	(0)
2017–2019	Paris FC	56	(0)
2019–2022	Nancy	77	(0)
2022–2026	Lausanne Ouchy	117	(0)
2026–	Nyon	4	(0)

International career^{‡}
2010–2010	Ivory Coast U20	8	(0)
2011	Ivory Coast B	2	(0)
- * Club domestic league appearances and goals as of 18 September 2026 ‡ National team caps and goals as of 16:03, 22 September 2019 (UTC)

Ogou Edmond Akichi (born 24 April 1990) is an Ivorian professional footballer who plays as a midfielder for Swiss Challenge League club Nyon.

== Club career ==
Akichi made his professional with Paris FC in a 0–0 Ligue 2 tie with Clermont Foot on 28 July 2017.

== International career ==
Akichi is a youth international for Ivory Coast, representing them at the 2010 and 2011 Toulon Tournaments. He helped the team win the 2010 Toulon Tournament, and he made three appearances at the 2011 tournament.

Akichi also represented Ivory Coast at the 2011 African Nations Championship, making two appearances.
