= Ernest Seka =

Guinean footballer (born 1987)

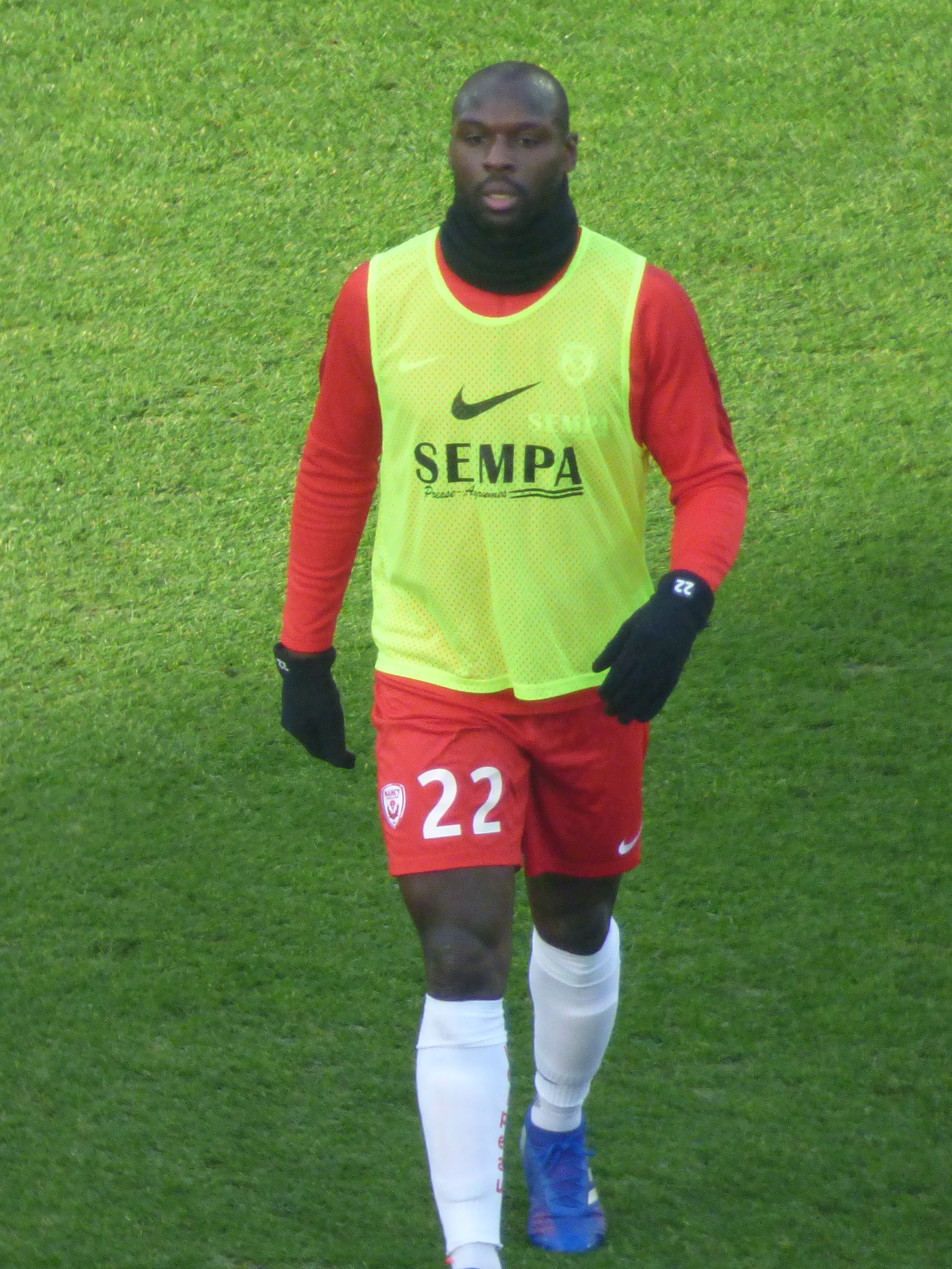
- Seka with Nancy in 2019

Personal information
- Full name: Ernest Seka Boka
- Date of birth: 22 June 1987 (age 39)
- Place of birth: Clichy, France
- Height: 1.85 m (6 ft 1 in)
- Position: Defender

Team information
- Current team: Chantilly
- Number: 22

Senior career*
Years	Team	Apps	(Gls)
2010–2011	L'Entente SSG	31	(2)
2011–2013	Poiré-sur-Vie	68	(4)
2013–2014	Amiens	33	(3)
2014–2018	Strasbourg	126	(5)
2018–2021	Nancy	87	(2)
2020	Nancy II	1	(0)
2022–2023	Poissy	22	(0)
2023–	Chantilly	36	(2)

International career^{‡}
2018–	Guinea	10	(0)
- * Club domestic league appearances and goals as of 23 November 2024 ‡ National team caps and goals as of 31 July 2020

Ernest Seka Boka (born 22 June 1987) is a professional footballer who plays as a defender for Championnat National 1 club Chantilly. Born in France, he represents Guinea internationally.

== International career ==
Seka was born in France to an Ivorian father and Guinean mother. On 23 April 2018, he agreed to represent the Guinea national team.

Seka received his first call and made his debut for Guinea in a 1–0 2019 Africa Cup of Nations qualification win over Central African Republic on 9 September 2018.

== Career statistics ==
=== International ===
As of matches played on 31 July 2020

Appearances and goals by national team and year
National team	Year	Apps	Goals
Guinea national team	2018	4	0
Guinea national team	2019	6	0
Total		10	0
