= Mathias Fischer (footballer) =

French footballer (born 1998)

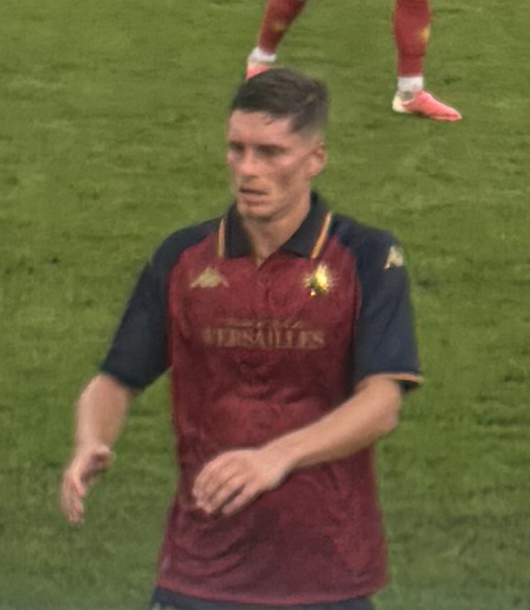
- Fischer with Versailles in 2026

Personal information
- Full name: Mathias Alain Fischer
- Date of birth: 11 July 1998 (age 28)
- Place of birth: Colmar, France
- Height: 1.81 m (5 ft 11 in)
- Position: Defender

Team information
- Current team: Versailles
- Number: 12

Youth career
- 2005–2010: FC Munchhouse
- 2010–2013: Colmar
- 2013–2018: Nancy

Senior career*
Years	Team	Apps	(Gls)
2014–2020	Nancy II	73	(1)
2018–2021	Nancy	10	(0)
2018–2019	→ Dunkerque (loan)	20	(0)
2019–2020	→ FC Villefranche (loan)	13	(1)
2021–2023	Bourg-Péronnas	49	(2)
2023–2025	Cannes	46	(2)
2025–	Versailles	30	(1)

International career^{‡}
2014	France U16-	2	(0)
2014	France U17	4	(0)
2016	France U18	3	(0)
2016–2017	France U19	6	(0)
- * Club domestic league appearances and goals as of 23 June 2026 ‡ National team caps and goals as of 17 February 2018

Mathias Alain Fischer (born 11 July 1998) is a French professional footballer who plays as a defender for Ligue 3 club Versailles.

== Career ==
Fischer made his professional debut with Nancy in a 2–1 Ligue 2 loss to Quevilly-Rouen on 9 February 2018.
