= Souleymane Karamoko =

French footballer (born 1992)

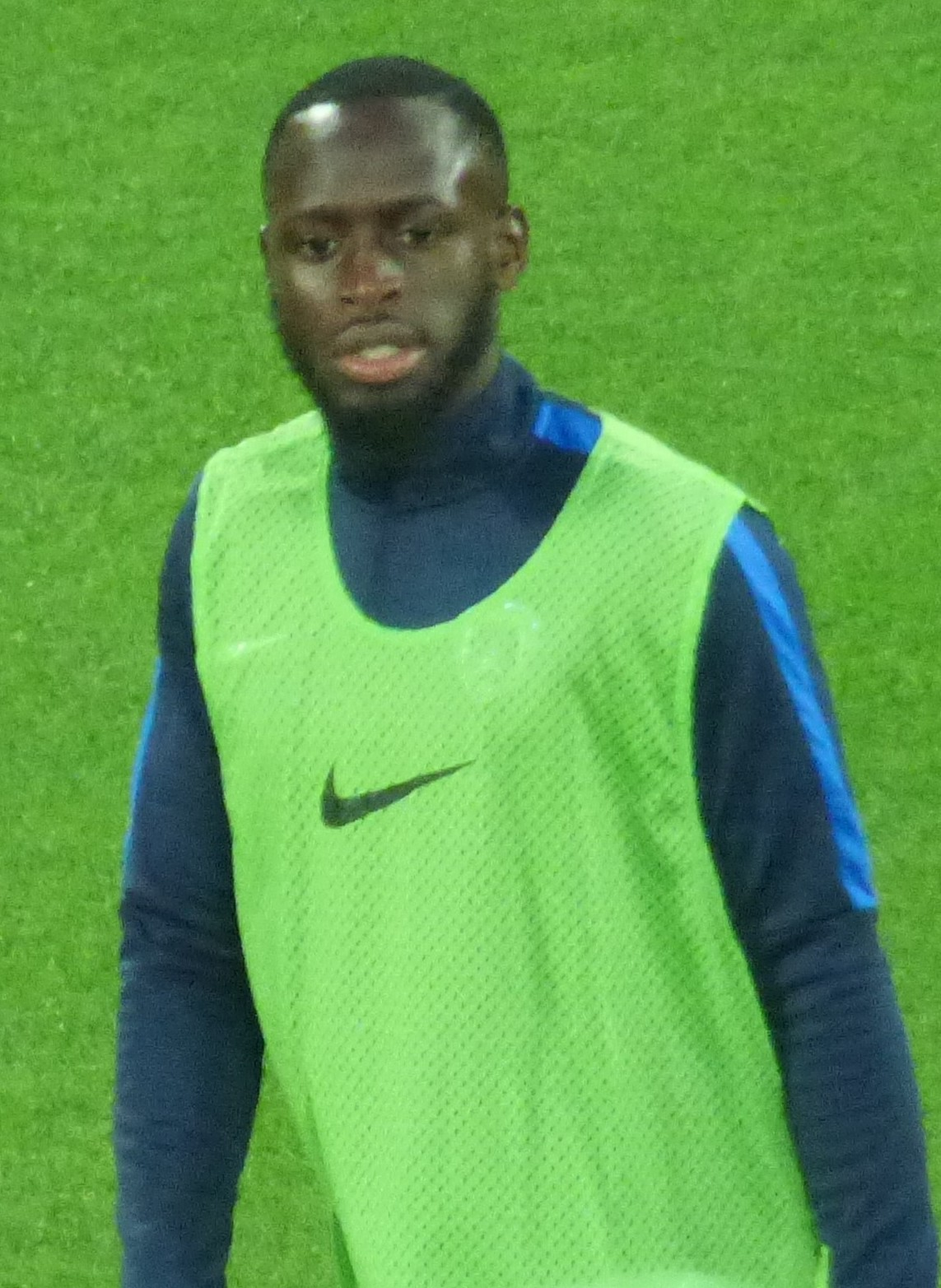
- Karamoko in 2018

Personal information
- Date of birth: 29 July 1992 (age 34)
- Place of birth: Paris, France
- Height: 1.70 m (5 ft 7 in)
- Position: Defender

Senior career*
Years	Team	Apps	(Gls)
2013	RCF Paris	11	(1)
2013–2017	L'Entente	88	(2)
2017–2019	Paris FC	51	(1)
2019–2022	Nancy	69	(0)
2023–2024	Virton	32	(0)

International career^{‡}
2021–	Mauritania	2	(0)
- * Club domestic league appearances and goals as of 14 May 2022 ‡ National team caps and goals as of 02:27, 10 January 2022 (UTC)

Souleymane Karamoko (born 29 July 1992) is a professional footballer who plays as a defender. Born in France, he plays for the Mauritania national team.

== Career ==
Karamoko made his professional debut with Paris FC in a Ligue 2 2–1 win over Bourg-en-Bresse on 4 August 2017.

== International career ==
Born in France, Karamoko is of Mauritanian descent. He was called up to represent the Mauritania national team for the 2021 Africa Cup of Nations. He debuted with the Mauritania national team in a 0–0 friendly tie with Burkina Faso on 30 December 2021.
