= Mickaël Biron =

Martiniquais footballer (born 1997)

Personal information
- Full name: Mickaël Christophe Biron
- Date of birth: 26 August 1997 (age 29)
- Place of birth: Ducos, Martinique
- Height: 1.70 m (5 ft 7 in)
- Positions: Forward; winger

Team information
- Current team: Batman Petrolspor (on loan from 1. FC Nürnberg)
- Number: 7

Youth career
- New Star Ducos
- Gri-Gri Pilotin
- 2013–2017: Champagne Sports
- 2017: Renens

Senior career*
Years	Team	Apps	(Gls)
2018	New Star Ducos		
2018–2019	Golden Lion		
2019–2020	SAS Épinal	16	(3)
2020–2021	Nancy	31	(12)
2021–2022	KV Oostende	0	(0)
2021–2022	→ Nancy (loan)	31	(7)
2022–2025	RWD Molenbeek	47	(24)
2024	→ OH Leuven (loan)	11	(0)
2025–	1. FC Nürnberg	12	(0)
2026–	→ Batman Petrolspor (loan)	14	(4)

International career^{‡}
2018–2024	Martinique	17	(7)
- * Club domestic league appearances and goals as of 11:34, 19 November 2026 (UTC) ‡ National team caps and goals as of 15 October 2024

Mickaël Christophe Biron (born 26 August 1997) is a Martiniquais professional footballer who plays as a forward or a winger for TFF 1. Lig club Batman Petrolspor, on loan from 2. Bundesliga club 1. FC Nürnberg, and the Martinique national team.

== Club career ==
On 2 July 2021, Biron was bought by Belgian club KV Oostende from French club Nancy for a club-record €5 million, but was immediately loaned back to Nancy for one season and later sold for €2.5 million, without playing a single game for Oostende. Both clubs were owned by the Pacific Media Group (PMG). Concerns were raised at the time by local media outlets, and in 2025 this transfer became central to a Belgian Federal Police investigation into PMG co-founder Paul Conway, in relation to 6 fraud allegations linked to Oostende's bankruptcy.

On 16 July 2022, Biron was bought for €2.5 million by RWD Molenbeek where he signed a three-year contract.

On 8 August 2024, Biron moved on loan to OH Leuven for one season, with a mandatory buy option and three-year contract for Biron in case OH Leuven would avoid relegation. A few months later, the loan deal was terminated early, with Biron moving back to RWD Molenbeek already as from 2025. Biron has made 11 league and 1 cup appearance for OH Leuven, but had failed to score.

On 10 July 2025, Biron joined 1. FC Nürnberg in Germany's 2. Bundesliga. On 1 July 2026, he was loaned to Batman Petrolspor in Turkey.

== Career statistics ==
=== Club ===
As of 2 June 2020

Appearances and goals by club, season and competition
Club	Season	League			National Cup		League Cup		Other		Total	
Club	Season	Division	Apps	Goals	Apps	Goals	Apps	Goals	Apps	Goals	Apps	Goals
Golden Lion	2018–19	Martinique Championnat National	–		1 (Note: Appearances in the Coupe de France)	1	–		0	0	1	1
SAS Épinal	2019–20	Championnat National 2	16	3	6	2	–		0	0	22	5
Nancy	2020–21	Ligue 2	0	0	0	0	0	0	0	0	0	0
Career total			16	3	7	3	0	0	0	0	23	5

=== International ===
As of matches played 15 October 2024

Appearances and goals by national team and year
National team	Year	Apps	Goals
Martinique	2018	4	4
Martinique	2019	4	0
Martinique	2022	4	2
Martinique	2023	3	1
Martinique	2024	2	0
Total		17	7

Scores and results list Martinique's goal tally first, score column indicates score after each Biron goal.

List of international goals scored by Mickaël Biron
No.	Date	Venue	Opponent	Score	Result	Competition
1	5 June 2018	Stade Pierre-Aliker, Fort-de-France, Martinique	French Guiana	1–0	3–0	Friendly
2	5 June 2018	Stade Pierre-Aliker, Fort-de-France, Martinique	French Guiana	2–0	3–0	Friendly
3	16 October 2018	Stade Pierre-Aliker, Fort-de-France, Martinique	British Virgin Islands	2–0	4–0	2019–20 CONCACAF Nations League qualification
4	16 October 2018	Stade Pierre-Aliker, Fort-de-France, Martinique	British Virgin Islands	4–0	4–0	2019–20 CONCACAF Nations League qualification
5	26 March 2022	Stade Robert Bobin, Bondoufle, France	Guadeloupe	3–2	4–3	Friendly
6	26 March 2022	Stade Robert Bobin, Bondoufle, France	Guadeloupe	4–2	4–3	Friendly
7	25 March 2023	Stade Pierre-Aliker, Fort-de-France, Martinique	Costa Rica	1–0	1–2	2022–23 CONCACAF Nations League A
