= Saliou Ciss =

Senegalese footballer (born 1989)

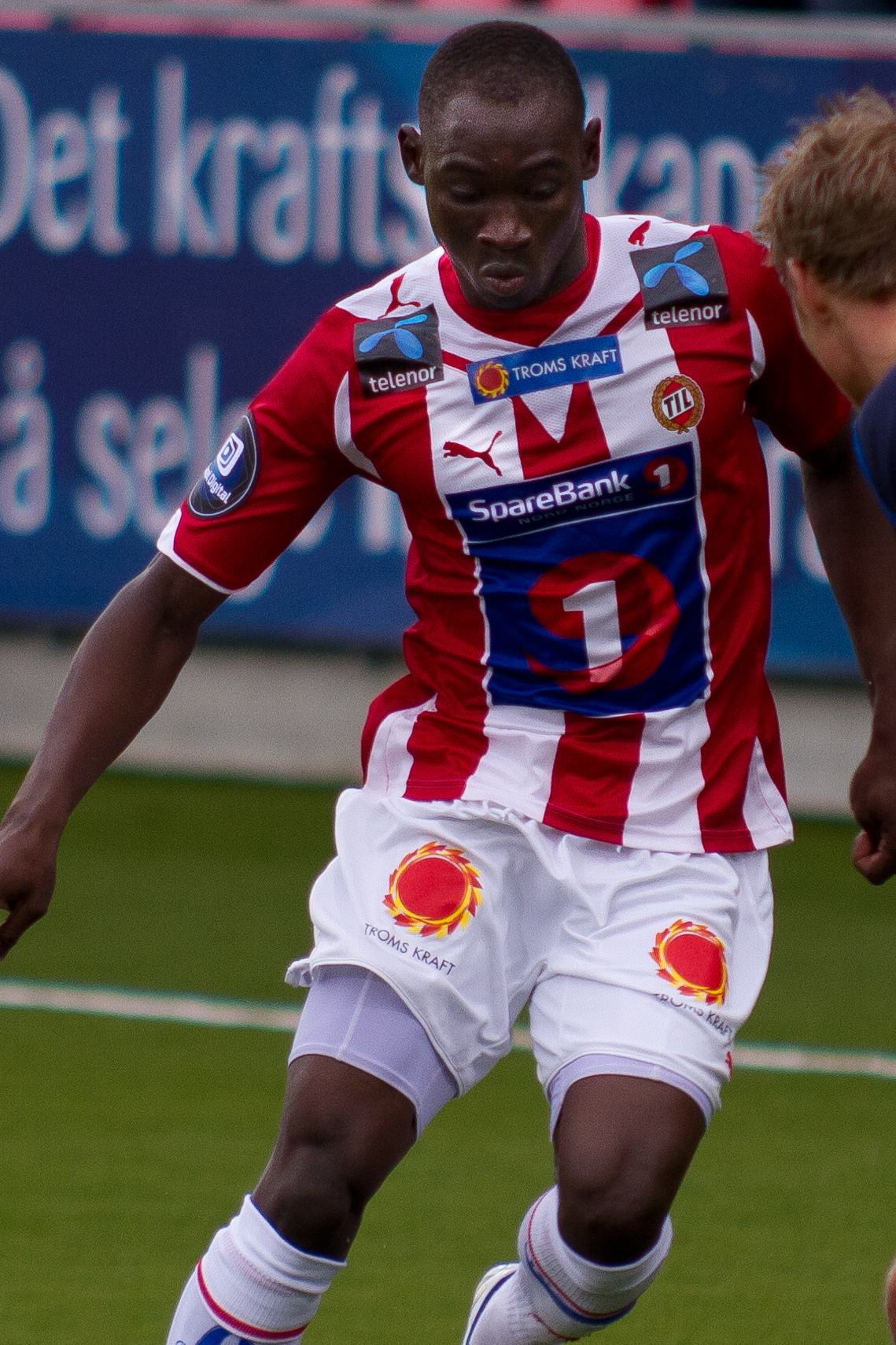
- Ciss playing for Tromsø in 2010

Personal information
- Date of birth: 15 September 1989 (age 37)
- Place of birth: Kholpa, Senegal
- Height: 1.73 m (5 ft 8 in)
- Positions: Left-back; left midfielder

Youth career
- 2007–2010: Diambars

Senior career*
Years	Team	Apps	(Gls)
2010–2013	Tromsø	71	(2)
2013–2017	Valenciennes	90	(8)
2017–2019	Angers	3	(0)
2018	→ Valenciennes (loan)	9	(2)
2019	→ Valenciennes (loan)	18	(0)
2019–2022	Nancy	69	(12)
2025–2026	Entente FC	22	(1)

International career^{‡}
2011–2012	Senegal U23	7	(0)
2012–2022	Senegal	39	(0)
Medal record
Men's football
Representing Senegal
Africa Cup of Nations
Winner	2021 Cameroon
Runner-up	2019 Egypt
- * Club domestic league appearances and goals as of 14 May 2022 ‡ National team caps and goals as of 7 June 2022

Saliou Ciss (born 15 September 1989) is a Senegalese professional footballer who plays as a left-back and left midfielder for the Senegal national team.

== Club career ==
Ciss received his footballing education at the Diambars academy in Senegal.

Following his graduation, he joined Serigne Kara, a fellow graduate, at Tromsø prior to the 2010 season, signing a five-year contract. He made his Tippeligaen debut as a substitute against Brann on 5 May 2010.

In August 2013 he joined Ligue 1 side Valenciennes.

In July 2017 he signed a three-year contract with Ligue 1 side Angers on a free transfer.

After six months on loan with Valenciennes in January to June 2018, he went there again on loan too in January 2019.

== International career ==
Ciss represented Senegal at the 2012 Summer Olympics. In May 2018, he was named in Senegal's 23-man squad for the 2018 FIFA World Cup in Russia. On 17 June however, he injured himself in training and was replaced in the squad by Adama Mbengue.

He was part of Senegal's squad for the 2021 Africa Cup of Nations; the Lions of Teranga went on to win the tournament for the first time in their history.

Ciss was appointed a Grand Officer of the National Order of the Lion by President of Senegal Macky Sall following the nation's victory at the tournament.

== Career statistics ==
=== Club ===
As of 27 July 2019

Appearances and goals by club, season and competition
Club	Season	League			Cup		Europe		Total	
Club	Season	Division	Apps	Goals	Apps	Goals	Apps	Goals	Apps	Goals
Tromsø	2010	Tippeligaen	13	0	3	0	—		16	0
Tromsø	2011	Tippeligaen	20	1	2	0	4	0	26	1
Tromsø	2012	Tippeligaen	23	1	7	1	3	0	33	2
Tromsø	2013	Tippeligaen	15	0	3	0	6	0	24	0
Tromsø	Total		71	2	15	1	13	0	99	3
Valenciennes	2013–14	Ligue 1	23	0	2	0	—		25	0
Valenciennes	2014–15	Ligue 2	26	0	3	0	—		29	0
Valenciennes	2015–16	Ligue 2	14	0	2	0	—		16	0
Valenciennes	2016–17	Ligue 2	27	8	0	0	—		27	8
Valenciennes	Total		90	8	7	0	—		97	8
Angers	2017–18	Ligue 1	3	0	2	1	—		5	1
Valenciennes (loan)	2017–18	Ligue 2	9	2	1	0	—		10	2
Valenciennes (loan)	2018–19	Ligue 2	18	0	0	0	—		18	2
Valenciennes (loan)	Total		27	2	1	0	—		28	2
Nancy	2019–20	Ligue 2	18	5	3	0	—		21	5
Career total			210	17	28	2	13	0	251	19

=== International ===
As of matches played on 7 June 2022

Appearances and goals by national team and year
National team	Year	Apps	Goals
Senegal	2012	1	0
Senegal	2014	1	0
Senegal	2015	3	0
Senegal	2016	3	0
Senegal	2017	9	0
Senegal	2018	1	0
Senegal	2019	2	0
Senegal	2020	1	0
Senegal	2021	8	0
Senegal	2022	10	0
Total		39	0

== Honours ==
Senegal

- Africa Cup of Nations: 2021; runner-up: 2019

Individual

- Africa Cup of Nations Team of the Tournament: 2021

Orders

- Grand Officer of the National Order of the Lion: 2022
