= Yanis Barka =

French professional footballer (born 1998)

Personal information
- Full name: Yanis Djamil Barka
- Date of birth: 18 April 1998 (age 28)
- Place of birth: Saint-Quentin, France
- Height: 1.83 m (6 ft 0 in)
- Position: Forward

Team information
- Current team: Dijon
- Number: 9

Youth career
- 2004–2007: Gauchy Grugies Biette Football
- 2007–2013: Saint-Quentin
- 2013–2017: Nancy

Senior career*
Years	Team	Apps	(Gls)
2015–2020	Nancy B	41	(10)
2017–2021	Nancy	34	(2)
2018–2019	→ Marignane Gignac (loan)	23	(2)
2021–2022	Beauvais	11	(5)
2022	Paris 13 Atletico	9	(1)
2022–2024	Beauvais	45	(19)
2024–2025	Fréjus Saint-Raphaël	17	(4)
2025–	Dijon	44	(15)

International career
2017	France U19	2	(1)
- * Club domestic league appearances and goals as of 22 June 2026

Yanis Djamil Barka (born 18 April 1998) is a French professional footballer who plays as a forward for Ligue 2 club Dijon.

== Club career ==
Barka made his first professional appearance with Nancy in a 2–2 Ligue 2 tie with Ajaccio on 17 November 2017. He signed his first professional contract on 11 December 2017. On 17 December 2021, Barka joined Championnat National 2 side Beauvais on a deal until the end of the season. On 23 June 2022, he signed for Paris 13 Atletico in the Championnat National.

On 2 December 2022, Barka returned to Beauvais.

On 31 January 2025, Barka signed a one-and-a-half-year contract with Dijon.

== International career ==
Born in France, Barka is of Algerian descent. He represented France at the 2017 Toulon Tournament, scoring a goal in his only appearance.
