= 2013 Coupe de la Ligue final =

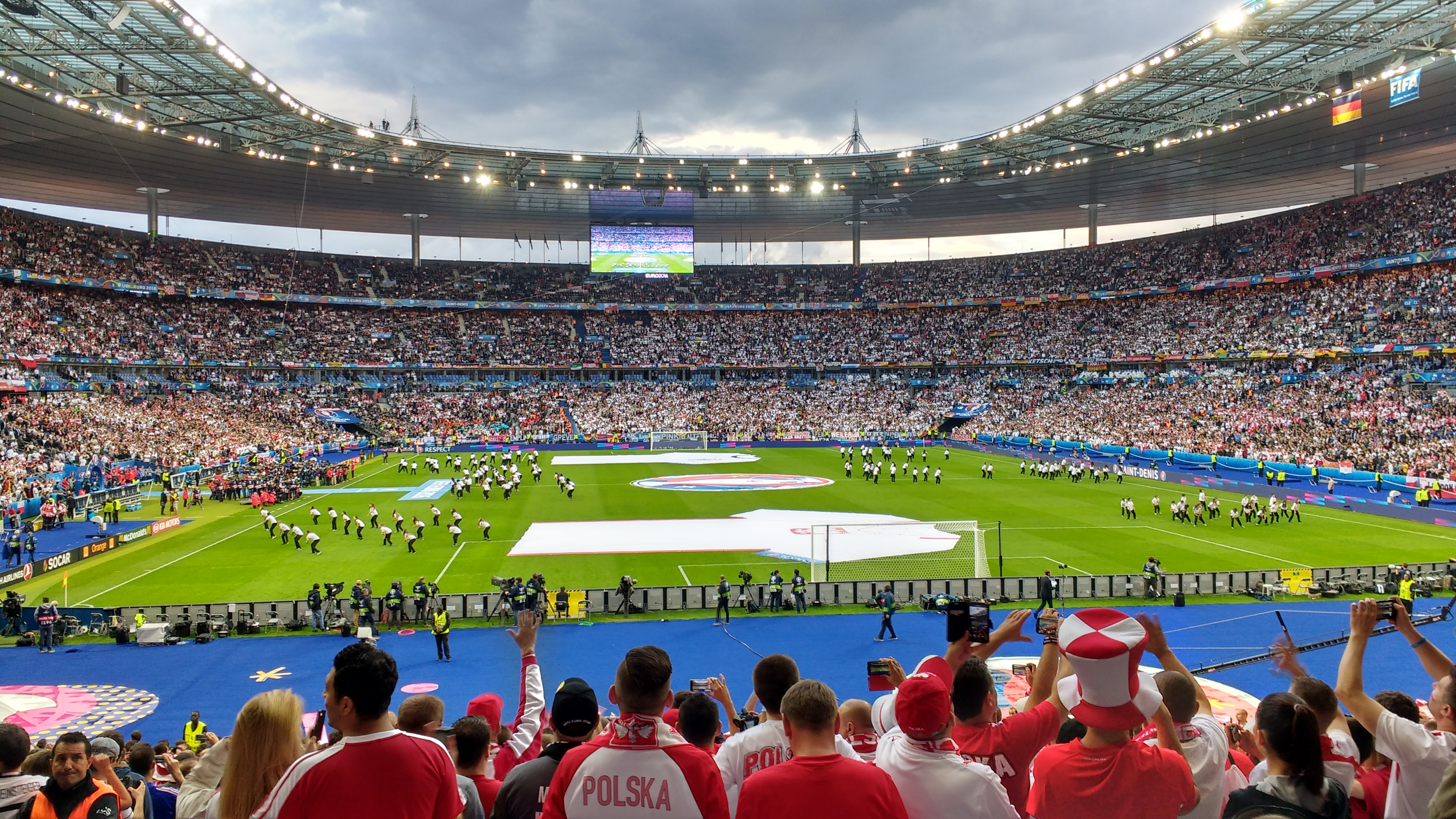
- Event: 2012–13 Coupe de la Ligue
Saint-Étienne	Rennes
Ligue 1	Ligue 1
1	0
- Date: 20 April 2013
- Venue: Stade de France, Saint-Denis
- Man of the Match: Brandão (Saint-Étienne)
- Referee: Ruddy Buquet (Picardie)
- Attendance: 79,000

The 2013 Coupe de la Ligue final was the 19th final of France's football league cup competition, the Coupe de la Ligue, a football competition for the 42 teams that the Ligue de Football Professionnel (LFP) manages. The final took place on 20 April 2013 at the Stade de France in Saint-Denis and was contested between Saint-Étienne and Rennes. Marseille were the defending champions, capturing their third title in a row in the 2012 Coupe de la Ligue final, but were eliminated by Paris Saint-Germain in the round of 16. The winner qualified for the 2013–14 UEFA Europa League in the third qualifying round, depending on their league finish.

== Route to the final ==
Note: In all results below, the score of the finalist is given first (H: home; A: away).

Saint-Étienne		Round	Rennes	
Opponent	Result	2016–17 Coupe de la Ligue	Opponent	Result
Lorient (A)	1–1 (a.e.t.) (3–0 p)	Third round	Nancy (H)	3–2
Sochaux (A)	3–0	Round of 16	Arles-Avignon (H)	1–0
Paris Saint-Germain (H)	0–0 (a.e.t.) (5–3 p)	Quarter-finals	Troyes (H)	2–1
Lille (H)	0–0 (a.e.t.) (7–6 p)	Semi-finals	Montpellier (H)	2–0

== Match ==
=== Details ===
20 April 2013
21:00 CEST

Saint-Étienne	1–0	Rennes
Brandão 18'	Report

Stade de France, Saint-Denis
Attendance: 79,087
Referee: Ruddy Buquet (Picardie)

Saint-Étienne	Rennes

GK	16	(France) Stéphane Ruffier
DF	29	(France) François Clerc
DF	4	(France) Kurt Zouma
DF	20	(France) Jonathan Brison
DF	24	(France) Loïc Perrin (c)
MF	10	(France) Renaud Cohade
MF	11	(France) Yohan Mollo	(substituted off) 74'
MF	18	(France) Fabien Lemoine
MF	19	(France) Josuha Guilavogui
FW	7	(Gabon) Pierre-Emerick Aubameyang
FW	14	(Brazil) Brandão
Substitutes:
GK	30	(France) Jessy Moulin
DF	12	(France) Jean-Pascal Mignot
DF	13	(Algeria) Faouzi Ghoulam
DF	26	(Senegal) Moustapha Bayal
MF	21	(France) Romain Hamouma	(substituted on) 74'
MF	27	(France) Mathieu Bodmer
MF	28	(Ivory Coast) Ismaël Diomande
Manager:
(France) Christophe Galtier

GK	1	(France) Benoît Costil
DF	29	(France) Romain Danzé (c)		(substituted off) 57'
DF	25	(Ghana) John Boye
DF	3	(France) Chris Mavinga
DF	5	(Cameroon) Jean-Armel Kana-Biyik
MF	15	(Cameroon) Jean Makoun
MF	8	(France) Julien Féret		(substituted off) 90+1'
FW	10	(Guinea) Sadio Diallo
MF	26	(France) Vincent Pajot	(yellow card) 68'
FW	7	(Burkina Faso) Jonathan Pitroipa
FW	9	(Turkey) Mevlüt Erdinç		(substituted off) 25'
Substitutes:
GK	16	(France) Abdoulaye Diallo
DF	4	(Nigeria) Onyekachi Apam		(substituted on) 57'
DF	20	(Ghana) John Mensah
DF	24	(France) Dimitri Foulquier
MF	6	(France) Alou Diarra
FW	18	(Mali) Cheick Diarra		(substituted on) 25'
FW	21	(Colombia) Víctor Montaño		(substituted on) 90+1'
Manager:
(France) Frédéric Antonetti

Man of the Match:
Brandão (Saint-Étienne)

Assistant referees:
Cyril Saint Cricq Lompre (Aquitaine)
Guillaume Debart (Picardie)
Fourth official:
Olivier Thual (Aquitaine)

Match rules

- 90 minutes.
- 30 minutes of extra-time if necessary.
- Penalty shoot-out if scores still level.
- Seven named substitutes.
- Maximum of three substitutions.

== See also ==
- 2013 Coupe de France final
- 2012–13 AS Saint-Étienne season
