= 2017–18 AS Saint-Étienne season =

AS Saint-Étienne
2017–18 season
- Chairman: Bernard Caiazzo; Roland Romeyer
- Manager: Óscar García (15 June 2017–15 November 2017) Resigned; Julien Sablé (15 November 2017–20 December 2017) Sacked; Jean-Louis Gasset (20 December 2017–Present)
- Stadium: Stade Geoffroy-Guichard
- Ligue 1: 7th
- Coupe de France: Round of 32
- Coupe de la Ligue: Third round
- Top goalscorer: League: Three players (7); All: Two players (8)
- Highest home attendance: 38,993 vs Lyon (5 November 2017)
- Lowest home attendance: 13,148 vs Nîmes (7 January 2018)
Home colours	Away colours	Third colours

The 2017–18 season was AS Saint-Étienne's fourteenth consecutive season in Ligue 1 since promotion from Ligue 2 in 2004.

== Squad ==
As of 31 January 2018

Note: Flags indicate national team as defined under FIFA eligibility rules; some limited exceptions apply. Players may hold more than one non-FIFA nationality.

No.	Pos.	Nation	Player
1	GK	FRA	Anthony Maisonnial
2	DF	FRA	Kévin Théophile-Catherine
3	DF	GRE	Alexandros Katranis
5	MF	FRA	Vincent Pajot
6	MF	FRA	Yann M'Vila
7	FW	FRA	Paul-Georges Ntep (on loan from VfL Wolfsburg)
8	MF	SEN	Assane Dioussé
10	MF	FRA	Rémy Cabella (on loan from Marseille)
11	DF	BRA	Gabriel Silva
12	DF	SEN	Cheikh M'Bengue
14	MF	FRA	Jonathan Bamba
15	DF	SUI	Saidy Janko
16	GK	FRA	Stéphane Ruffier
17	MF	NOR	Ole Selnæs

No.	Pos.	Nation	Player
20	MF	BRA	Hernani (on loan from Zenit)
21	FW	FRA	Romain Hamouma
22	FW	FRA	Kévin Monnet-Paquet
24	DF	FRA	Loïc Perrin (captain)
25	FW	MAR	Oussama Tannane
26	DF	FRA	Mathieu Debuchy
27	FW	SLO	Robert Berić
28	DF	SRB	Neven Subotić
29	DF	FRA	Ronaël Pierre-Gabriel
30	GK	FRA	Jessy Moulin
31	MF	FRA	Rayan Souici
32	MF	CPV	Kenny Rocha Santos
33	FW	CPV	Vagner
40	GK	FRA	Alexis Guendouz

=== Out on loan ===
Note: Flags indicate national team as defined under FIFA eligibility rules; some limited exceptions apply. Players may hold more than one non-FIFA nationality.

No.	Pos.	Nation	Player
—	DF	SUI	Léo Lacroix (on loan to Basel)
—	DF	FRA	Pierre-Yves Polomat (on loan to Auxerre)
—	MF	CIV	Habib Maïga (on loan to Arsenal Tula)

No.	Pos.	Nation	Player
—	MF	POR	Jorginho (on loan to Chaves)
—	FW	FRA	Arnaud Nordin (on loan to Nancy)
—	FW	FRA	Loïs Diony (on loan to Bristol City)

== Transfers ==
=== Summer ===
In: Note: Flags indicate national team as defined under FIFA eligibility rules; some limited exceptions apply. Players may hold more than one non-FIFA nationality.

No.	Pos.	Nation	Player
3	DF	GRE	Alexandros Katranis (from (Greece) Atromitos Athens)
8	MF	SEN	Assane Diousse (from (Italy) Empoli)
9	FW	FRA	Loïs Diony (from (France) Dijon)
10	MF	FRA	Rémy Cabella (on loan from (France) Olympique de Marseille)
11	DF	BRA	Gabriel Silva (from (Italy) Udinese)
14	MF	FRA	Jonathan Bamba (loan return from (France) Angers)
15	DF	SUI	Saidy Janko (from (Scotland) Celtic, previously on loan at (England) Barnsley)
20	MF	BRA	Hernani (on loan from (Russia) Zenit St. Petersburg)

Out: Note: Flags indicate national team as defined under FIFA eligibility rules; some limited exceptions apply. Players may hold more than one non-FIFA nationality.

No.	Pos.	Nation	Player
3	DF	FRA	Pierre-Yves Polomat (on loan to (France) Auxerre)
6	MF	FRA	Jérémy Clément (to (France) Nancy)
8	MF	FRA	Benjamin Corgnet (to (France) Strasbourg)
9	FW	FRA	Nolan Roux (to (France) Metz)
10	MF	MAR	Oussama Tannane (on loan to (Spain) Las Palmas)
11	MF	SEN	Henri Saivet (loan return to (England) Newcastle United)
18	MF	FRA	Fabien Lemoine (to (France) Lorient)
25	DF	FRA	Kevin Malcuit (to (France) Lille)
26	FW	POR	Jorginho (on loan to (Portugal) Chaves)
27	FW	SLO	Robert Berić (on loan to (Belgium) Anderlecht)
32	MF	FRA	Arnaud Nordin (on loan to (France) Nancy)
—	FW	FRA	Neal Maupay (to (England) Brentford, previously on loan at (France) Stade Brestois)
—	FW	CGO	Dylan Saint-Louis (to (France) Paris FC, previously on loan at (France) Stade Laval)

=== Winter ===
In: Note: Flags indicate national team as defined under FIFA eligibility rules; some limited exceptions apply. Players may hold more than one non-FIFA nationality.

No.	Pos.	Nation	Player
6	MF	FRA	Yann M'Vila (from (Russia) Rubin Kazan)
18	FW	FRA	Paul-Georges Ntep (loan from (Germany) VfL Wolfsburg)
26	DF	FRA	Mathieu Debuchy (from (England) Arsenal)
27	FW	SLO	Robert Berić (loan return from (Belgium) Anderlecht)
28	DF	SRB	Neven Subotić (from (Germany) Borussia Dortmund)

Out: Note: Flags indicate national team as defined under FIFA eligibility rules; some limited exceptions apply. Players may hold more than one non-FIFA nationality.

No.	Pos.	Nation	Player
4	DF	SUI	Léo Lacroix (on loan to (Switzerland) Basel)
7	MF	FRA	Bryan Dabo (to (Italy) Fiorentina)
9	FW	FRA	Loïs Diony (on loan to (England) Bristol City)
13	MF	CIV	Habib Maïga (loan to (Russia) Arsenal Tula)
19	DF	GUI	Florentin Pogba (to (Turkey) Gençlerbirliği)
23	FW	NOR	Alexander Søderlund (to (Norway) Rosenborg)

== Competitions ==
=== Ligue 1 ===
==== League table ====
Pos	Team	Pld	W	D	L	GF	GA	GD	Pts	Qualification or relegation
5	Rennes	38	16	10	12	50	44	+6	58	Qualification for the Europa League group stage (Note: Since the winners of the 2017–18 Coupe de France and the 2017–18 Coupe de la Ligue, Paris Saint-Germain, qualified for European competition based on league position, the spot awarded to the Coupe de France winners (Europa League group stage) was passed to the fourth-placed team and the spot awarded to the Coupe de la Ligue winners (Europa League third qualifying round) was passed to the sixth-placed team. The fifth-placed team received the spot in Europa League third qualifying round originally designated to the fourth-placed team.)
6	Bordeaux	38	16	7	15	53	48	+5	55	Qualification for the Europa League second qualifying round
7	Saint-Étienne	38	15	10	13	47	50	−3	55	
8	Nice	38	15	9	14	53	52	+1	54	
9	Nantes	38	14	10	14	36	41	−5	52	

Source: Ligue 1 and Soccerway
Rules for classification: 1) Points; 2) Goal difference; 3) Head-to-head points; 4) Head-to-head goal difference; 5) Head-to-head goals scored; 6) Head-to-head away goals; 7) Goals scored; 8) Away goals scored; 9) Most goals scored in one league match; 10) Fair-play points

==== Results summary ====
Overall								Home						Away					
Pld	W	D	L	GF	GA	GD	Pts	W	D	L	GF	GA	GD	W	D	L	GF	GA	GD
38	15	10	13	47	49	−2	55	8	7	4	32	27	+5	7	3	9	15	22	−7

Last updated: 19 May 2018.
Source: Results

==== Results by round ====
Round	1	2	3	4	5	6	7	8	9	10	11	12	13	14	15	16	17	18	19	20	21	22	23	24	25	26	27	28	29	30	31	32	33	34	35	36	37	38
Ground	H	A	H	A	H	A	H	A	H	H	A	H	A	H	A	H	A	H	A	H	A	A	H	A	H	A	A	H	A	H	A	H	A	H	A	H	A	H
Result	W	W	W	L	D	W	D	L	W	L	D	L	L	D	L	D	L	L	L	W	L	L	W	W	D	W	D	D	D	W	W	D	W	W	W	L	L	W
Position	8	5	3	3	4	3	4	7	3	6	6	6	7	8	11	13	15	16	16	14	14	16	14	12	14	11	12	13	11	9	9	9	8	6	6	6	8	7

Source: Results
A = Away; H = Home; W = Win; D = Draw; L = Loss

==== Results ====
5 August 2017 1	Saint-Étienne	1–0	Nice	Saint-Étienne
20:00 CEST (UTC+02:00)	Bamba 4'; Théophile-Catherine (yellow card) 12'; Selnæs (yellow card) 66'	Report	Dante (yellow card) 70'	Stadium: Stade Geoffroy-Guichard; Attendance: 25,879; Referee: François Letexier

12 August 2017 2	Caen	0–1	Saint-Étienne	Caen
20:00 CEST (UTC+02:00)	Delaplace (yellow card) 78'	Report	Théophile-Catherine (yellow card) 51'; Hamouma 67'	Stadium: Stade Michel d'Ornano; Attendance: 17,606; Referee: Stephane Jochem

19 August 2017 3	Saint-Étienne	3–0	Amiens	Saint-Étienne
20:00 CEST (UTC+02:00)	Bamba 14' (pen.); Dabo 40' (pen.), 66', (yellow card) 66'; Janko (yellow card) 44'	Report	Gurtner (yellow card) 39'; Dibassy (yellow card) 82'	Stadium: Stade Geoffroy-Guichard; Attendance: 30,004; Referee: Jérôme Brisard

25 August 2017 4	Paris Saint-Germain	3–0	Saint-Étienne	Paris
20:45 CEST (UTC+02:00)	Cavani 19' (pen.), 88'; Meunier (yellow card) 38'; Kimpembe (yellow card) 45'; Motta 50'	Report	Janko (yellow card) 18'; Théophile-Catherine (yellow card) 49'; Tannane (yellow card) 86'	Stadium: Parc des Princes; Attendance: 46,957; Referee: Clément Turpin

10 September 2017 5	Saint-Étienne	1–1	Angers	Saint-Étienne
15:00 CEST (UTC+02:00)	Cabella 1'; Pierre-Gabriel (yellow card) 8'; Pajot (yellow card) 34' (red card) 49'; Dabo (yellow card) 62'	Report	Santamaria (yellow card) 5'; Mangani 9' (pen.); Andreu (yellow card) 11'; Crivelli (yellow card) 83'	Stadium: Stade Geoffroy-Guichard; Attendance: 29,740; Referee: Karim Abed

16 September 2017 6	Dijon	0–1	Saint-Étienne	Dijon
20:00 CEST (UTC+02:00)	Chafik (yellow card) 48'; Marié (yellow card) 57'; Xeka (yellow card) 79'	Report	Bamba 49' (pen.); Selnæs (yellow card) 55'; Maïga (yellow card) 65'; Dabo (yellow card) 76'	Stadium: Stade Gaston Gérard; Attendance: 13,820; Referee: Benoit Bastien

24 September 2017 7	Saint-Étienne	2–2	Stade Rennais	Saint-Étienne
15:00 CEST (UTC+02:00)	Dioussé (yellow card) 4'; Théophile-Catherine (yellow card) 31'; Janko (yellow card) 34'; Gabriel Silva 45+2', (red card) 90+4'; Bamba 70' (pen.)	Report	Bourigeaud 41'; Khazri 53' (pen.); Amalfitano (yellow card) 59'; André (yellow card) 69'; Traoré (yellow card) 75'	Stadium: Stade Geoffroy-Guichard; Attendance: 31,043; Referee: Jerome Miguelgorry

1 October 2017 8	Troyes	2–1	Saint-Étienne	Troyes
15:00 CEST (UTC+02:00)	Azamoum (red card) 33'; Pelé 41'; Khaoui 57'; Dingomé (yellow card) 74'; Bellugou (yellow card) 86'; Niane (yellow card) 89'	Report	Hernani 53', (red card) 84'; Cabella (yellow card) 78'	Stadium: Stade de l'Aube; Attendance: 11,823; Referee: Nicolas Rainville

14 October 2017 9	Saint-Étienne	3–1	Metz	Saint-Étienne
20:00 CEST (UTC+02:00)	Hamouma (yellow card) 45+1'; Pajot 74'; Dabo (penalty missed) 85', (yellow card) 90+2'; Cafú 85' (o.g.); Maïga 90+5'	Report	Diagne 20' (yellow card) 21'	Stadium: Stade Geoffroy-Guichard; Attendance: 24,613; Referee: Olivier Thual

20 October 2017 10	Saint-Étienne	0–1	Montpellier	Saint-Étienne
20:45 CET (UTC+01:00)	Hamouma (yellow card) 74'; Lacroix (yellow card) 85'	Report	Mbenza 21'; Skhiri (yellow card) 53'; Congré (yellow card) 68'; Lasne (yellow card) 90'	Stadium: Stade Geoffroy-Guichard; Attendance: 24,004; Referee: Frank Schneider

29 October 2017 11	Toulouse	0–0	Saint-Étienne	Toulouse
17:00 CET (UTC+01:00)	Jullien (yellow card) 45+1'; Toivonen (yellow card) 79'	Report	M'Bengue (yellow card) 35'; Maïga (yellow card) 66'; Théophile-Catherine (yellow card) 74'	Stadium: Stadium Municipal; Attendance: 15,062; Referee: Jérôme Brisard

5 November 2017 12	Saint-Étienne	0–5	Lyon	Saint-Étienne
21:00 CET (UTC+01:00)	Lacroix (red card) 47'; Selnæs (yellow card) 60'	Report	Depay 11'; Fekir 26', 85', (yellow card) 85'; Tousart (yellow card) 54'; Mariano 58'; Traoré 65'	Stadium: Stade Geoffroy-Guichard; Attendance: 38,993; Referee: Clément Turpin

17 November 2017 13	Lille	3–1	Saint-Étienne	Villeneuve-d'Ascq
19:00 CET (UTC+01:00)	Pépé 20'; Malcuit (yellow card) 25'; Mendes 71'; Ballo-Touré (yellow card) 81'; Ponce 89'	Report	Perrin (yellow card) 12'; Pierre-Gabriel (yellow card) 19'; Bamba 45' (pen.); Dabo (yellow card) 76'	Stadium: Stade Pierre-Mauroy; Attendance: 28,019; Referee: Johann Hamel

24 November 2017 14	Saint-Étienne	2–2	Strasbourg	Saint-Étienne
20:45 CET (UTC+01:00)	Dioussé (yellow card) 10'; Hernani 41', (yellow card) 43'; Monnet-Paquet 56'; Pogba (yellow card) 62'; Pajot (yellow card) 82'	Report	Grimm (yellow card) 32'; Aholou 44'; Martin 63' (pen.); Bahoken (yellow card) 65'	Stadium: Stade Geoffroy-Guichard; Attendance: 21,282; Referee: Benoit Bastien

28 November 2017 15	Bordeaux	3–0	Saint-Étienne	Bordeaux
21:00 CET (UTC+01:00)	Mendy 5', 57'; Malcom 31'; Cafu (yellow card) 34'	Report	Pajot (yellow card) 38'; Janko (yellow card) 64'	Stadium: Matmut Atlantique; Attendance: 21,115; Referee: Mikael Lesage

3 December 2017 16	Saint-Étienne	1–1	Nantes	Saint-Étienne
15:00 CET (UTC+01:00)	Pajot 38'; Janko (yellow card) 50'; Lacroix (yellow card) 58'; Selnæs (yellow card) 80'; Dabo (yellow card) 89'	Report	Sala 61'; Awaziem (yellow card) 72'	Stadium: Stade Geoffroy-Guichard; Attendance: 24,085; Referee: François Letexier

10 December 2017 17	Marseille	3–0	Saint-Étienne	Marseille
21:00 CET (UTC+01:00)	Germain 11', 71'; Abdennour (yellow card) 21'; Ocampos 80'	Report	Dabo (yellow card) 30'; Pierre-Gabriel (red card) 51'; Lacroix (yellow card) 61'	Stadium: Stade Vélodrome; Attendance: 41,943; Referee: Nicolas Rainville

15 December 2017 18	Saint-Étienne	0–4	Monaco	Saint-Étienne
20:45 CET (UTC+01:00)	Ruffier (red card) 53'; Pajot (yellow card) 73'	Report	Sidibé 4'; Lemar 32'; Fabinho 53'; Keita 61'	Stadium: Stade Geoffroy-Guichard; Attendance: 23,107; Referee: Amaury Delerue

20 December 2017 19	Guingamp	2–1	Saint-Étienne	Guingamp
20:50 CET (UTC+01:00)	Deaux (yellow card) 45'; Benezet 70', (yellow card) 88'; Briand 90+5' (yellow card) 90+6'	Report	Dabo (yellow card) 17'; Søderlund (red card) 24'; M'Bengue (yellow card) 29'; Hernani 67'	Stadium: Stade de Roudourou; Attendance: 14,165; Referee: Johann Hamel

14 January 2018 20	Saint-Étienne	2–0	Toulouse	Saint-Étienne
15:00 CET (UTC+01:00)	Berić 45' (pen.); Gabriel Silva (yellow card) 47'; Dabo (yellow card) 80'; Dioussé 86'	Report	Gradel (yellow card) 38'; Delort (yellow card) 44'; Amian (yellow card) 90+2'	Stadium: Stade Geoffroy-Guichard; Attendance: 23,295; Referee: Mikael Lesage

17 January 2018 21	Metz	3–0	Saint-Étienne	Metz
19:00 CET (UTC+01:00)	Rivière 13' (pen.); Dossevi 16'; Cohade (yellow card) 37'; Roux 77'	Report	Moulin (yellow card) 12'; Dabo (yellow card) 37'; Hernani (yellow card) 83' (yellow-red card) 85'	Stadium: Stade Saint-Symphorien; Attendance: 12,702; Referee: Benoît Millot

21 January 2018 22	Nice	1–0	Saint-Étienne	Nice
15:00 CET (UTC+01:00)	Cyprien 22'; Seri (yellow card) 59'; Balotelli (yellow card) 69'	Report	Dioussé (yellow card) 73'	Stadium: Allianz Riviera; Attendance: 23,254; Referee: Frank Schneider

27 January 2018 23	Saint-Étienne	2–1	Caen	Saint-Étienne
20:00 CET (UTC+01:00)	Ntep 35'; M'Vila (yellow card) 64'; Bamba 78'; Gabriel Silva (yellow card) 90'	Report	Rodelin 11'; Peeters (yellow card) 83'	Stadium: Stade Geoffroy-Guichard; Attendance: 21,559; Referee: Sébastien Moreira

3 February 2018 24	Amiens	0–2	Saint-Étienne	Amiens
20:00 CET (UTC+01:00)	Konaté (yellow card) 24'; Adénon (yellow card) 54'	Report	Bamba (yellow card) 57'; Debuchy 62'; Cabella 85'	Stadium: Stade de la Licorne; Attendance: 9,255; Referee: Thomas Leonard

9 February 2018 25	Saint-Étienne	2–2	Marseille	Saint-Étienne
20:45 CET (UTC+01:00)	Monnet-Paquet 9'; Berić 75'	Report	Thauvin 4'; Sanson 20'	Stadium: Stade Geoffroy-Guichard; Attendance: 30,162; Referee: Frank Schneider

17 February 2018 26	Angers	0–1	Saint-Étienne	Angers
20:00 CET (UTC+01:00)	Tait (yellow card) 47'	Report	Selnæs (yellow card) 34'; Cabella (yellow card) 57'; Berić 79'	Stadium: Stade Raymond Kopa; Attendance: 11,166; Referee: Antony Gautier

25 February 2018 27	Lyon	1–1	Saint-Étienne	Décines-Charpieu
17:00 CET (UTC+01:00)	Mariano 19' (yellow card) 77'	Report	Selnæs (yellow card) 42'; Subotić (yellow card) 84'; Debuchy 90'; Hamouma (yellow card) 90+3'	Stadium: Parc Olympique Lyonnais; Attendance: 58,069; Referee: Ruddy Buquet

3 March 2018 28	Saint-Étienne	2–2	Dijon	Saint-Étienne
20:00 CET (UTC+01:00)	Berić 45+1', 61'	Report	Tavares 32' (yellow card) 89'; Djilobodji (yellow card) 38'; Amalfitano (yellow card) 53'; Saïd 55'; Lautoa (yellow card) 73'	Stadium: Stade Geoffroy-Guichard; Attendance: 25,150; Referee: Benoît Millot

10 March 2018 29	Stade Rennais	1–1	Saint-Étienne	Rennes
20:00 CET (UTC+01:00)	Sarr 86'	Report	Subotić 35'; Hamouma (yellow card) 56'; Dioussé (yellow card) 75'; Debuchy (yellow card) 77'; Perrin (yellow card) 89'	Stadium: Roazhon Park; Attendance: 25,655; Referee: Bastien

18 March 2018 30	Saint-Étienne	2–0	Guingamp	Saint-Étienne
17:00 CET (UTC+01:00)	Subotić 29'; Perrin (yellow card) 52'; Pajot (yellow card) 75'; Cabella 79'	Report	Pereira (yellow card) 25'; Coco (yellow card) 35'; Thuram (yellow card) 65'; Diallo (yellow card) 79'	Stadium: Stade Geoffroy-Guichard; Attendance: 25,073; Referee: Amaury Delerue

1 April 2018 31	Nantes	0–3	Saint-Étienne	Nantes
17:00 CEST (UTC+02:00)	Thomasson (yellow card) 56'; Rongier (yellow card) 61'; Bammou (yellow card) 67'	Report	Debuchy 17'; Cabella 54', 63'	Stadium: Stade de la Beaujoire; Attendance: 31,043

6 April 2018 32	Saint-Étienne	1–1	Paris Saint-Germain	Saint-Étienne
20:45 CEST (UTC+02:00)	Cabella 17'; Selnæs (yellow card) 67'	Report	Kimpembe (yellow card) 29' (yellow-red card) 41'; Pastore (yellow card) 44'; Diarra (yellow card) 45+1'; Debuchy 90+2' (o.g.)	Stadium: Stade Geoffroy-Guichard; Attendance: 37,602; Referee: Nicolas Rainville

14 April 2018 33	Strasbourg	0–1	Saint-Étienne	Strasbourg
20:00 CEST (UTC+02:00)	Grimm (yellow card) 45'; Foulquier (yellow card) 80'; Blayac (yellow card) 90+4'	Report	Debuchy 82'; Cabella (yellow card) 90+1'	Stadium: Stade de la Meinau; Attendance: 25,377; Referee: Mikael Lesage

22 April 2018 34	Saint-Étienne	2–1	Troyes	Saint-Étienne
18:00 CEST (UTC+02:00)	Berić 69', 74'	Report	Niane 8'; Bellugou (yellow card) 63'; Traoré (yellow card) 80'	Stadium: Stade Geoffroy-Guichard; Attendance: 31,692; Referee: Stéphane Jochem

27 April 2018 35	Montpellier	0–1	Saint-Étienne	Montpellier
20:45 CEST (UTC+02:00)		Report	Hamouma 10'; Ruffier (yellow card) 40'; Ntep (yellow card) 90+2'	Stadium: Stade de la Mosson; Attendance: 15,814; Referee: Thomas Leonnard

6 May 2018 36	Saint-Étienne	1–3	Bordeaux	Saint-Étienne
15:00 CEST (UTC+02:00)	Cabella 28' (pen.); Selnæs (yellow card) 45+2'; Ntep (yellow card) 88'	Report	Sankharé 30'; Koundé 36'; Lerager (yellow card) 68'; Lewczuk (yellow card) 85'; Costil (yellow card) 90'; Malcom 90+4'	Stadium: Stade Geoffroy-Guichard; Attendance: 33,741; Referee: Sébastien Moreira

12 May 2018 37	Monaco	1–0	Saint-Étienne	Monaco
21:00 CEST (UTC+02:00)	Serrano (yellow card) 7'; Fabinho 90+1' (pen.); Ghezzal (red card) 90+4'	Report	Théophile-Catherine (yellow card) 41'	Stadium: Stade Louis II; Attendance: 10,742; Referee: Benoît Bastien

19 May 2018 38	Saint-Étienne	5–0	Lille	Saint-Étienne
21:00 CEST (UTC+02:00)	Bamba 7'; Hamouma 13', 40', 61'; Selnæs (yellow card) 58'; Malcuit 66' (o.g.)	Report	Mothiba (yellow card) 61'	Stadium: Stade Geoffroy-Guichard; Attendance: 33,665; Referee: François Letexier

=== Coupe de France ===
7 January 2018 Round of 64	Saint-Étienne	2–0	Nîmes	Saint-Étienne
14:15 CET (UTC+1)	Hernani (yellow card) 45'; Selnæs (yellow card) 61'; Berić 63'; Bamba 68'	Report	Boscagli (red card) 12'; Savanier (yellow card) 17'	Stadium: Stade Geoffroy-Guichard; Attendance: 13,148; Referee: Olivier Thual

24 January 2018 Round of 32	Troyes	1–1 (4–3 p)	Saint-Étienne	Troyes
18:30 CET (UTC+1)	Nivet 24' (pen.); Obiang (yellow card) 55'; Samassa (yellow card) 115'	Report	Moulin (yellow card) 24'; Pogba (yellow card) 35'; Maïga 48'; Pierre-Gabriel (yellow card) 88'	Stadium: Stade de l'Aube; Attendance: 3,921; Referee: Mikael Lesage

=== Coupe de la Ligue ===
25 October 2017 Third round	Strasbourg	1–1 (5–4 p)	Saint-Étienne	Strasbourg
21:05 CEST (UTC+2)	Bahoken 37'; Lala (yellow card) 81'	Report	Hernani (yellow card) 21', (goal) 84'; Lacroix (yellow card) 33'	Stadium: Stade de la Meinau; Attendance: 18,317; Referee: Mikael Lesage
	Penalties
	Lala (penalty scored); Nogueira (penalty scored); Gonçalves (penalty scored); Sacko (penalty scored); Koné (penalty scored)		(penalty missed) Hamouma; (penalty scored) Hernani; (penalty scored) Søderlund; (penalty scored) Silva; (penalty scored) Bamba

== Squad statistics ==
As of match played 19 May 2018

=== Appearances and goals ===
No.	Pos	Nat	Player	Total		Ligue 1		Coupe de France		Coupe de la Ligue	
No.	Pos	Nat	Player	Apps	Goals	Apps	Goals	Apps	Goals	Apps	Goals
2	DF	(France) FRA	Kévin Théophile-Catherine	27	0	24+1	0	1	0	1	0
5	MF	(France) FRA	Vincent Pajot	21	2	15+5	2	0	0	1	0
6	MF	(France) FRA	Yann M'Vila	17	0	17	0	0	0	0	0
7	FW	(France) FRA	Paul-Georges Ntep	11	0	3+8	0	0	0	0	0
8	MF	(Senegal) SEN	Assane Dioussé	26	1	18+7	1	0+1	0	0	0
10	MF	(France) FRA	Rémy Cabella	26	7	24+1	7	1	0	0	0
11	DF	(Brazil) BRA	Gabriel Silva	27	1	23+2	1	1	0	0+1	0
12	DF	(Senegal) SEN	Cheikh M'Bengue	10	0	6+1	0	2	0	1	0
14	MF	(France) FRA	Jonathan Bamba	37	8	27+7	7	1+1	1	1	0
15	DF	(Switzerland) SUI	Saidy Janko	21	0	16+4	0	0	0	1	0
16	GK	(France) FRA	Stéphane Ruffier	36	0	35	0	0	0	1	0
17	MF	(Norway) NOR	Ole Selnæs	29	0	23+3	0	2	0	1	0
18	FW	(France) FRA	Paul-Georges Ntep	2	1	2	1	0	0	0	0
20	MF	(Brazil) BRA	Hernani	17	4	5+9	3	2	0	1	1
21	FW	(France) FRA	Romain Hamouma	32	5	22+7	5	2	0	0+1	0
22	FW	(France) FRA	Kévin Monnet-Paquet	31	2	21+9	2	0	0	1	0
24	DF	(France) FRA	Loïc Perrin	28	0	28	0	0	0	0	0
25	FW	(Morocco) MAR	Oussama Tannane	3	0	0+3	0	0	0	0	0
26	DF	(France) FRA	Mathieu Debuchy	15	4	15	4	0	0	0	0
27	FW	(Slovenia) SLO	Robert Berić	16	8	12+3	7	0+1	1	0	0
28	DF	(Serbia) SRB	Neven Subotić	16	2	16	2	0	0	0	0
29	DF	(France) FRA	Ronaël Pierre-Gabriel	17	0	13+3	0	1	0	0	0
30	GK	(France) FRA	Jessy Moulin	6	0	3+1	0	2	0	0	0
31	MF	(France) FRA	Mahdi Camara	1	0	0	0	0+1	0	0	0
32	DF	(Ivory Coast) CIV	Benjamin Karamoko	1	0	0	0	1	0	0	0
33	FW	(Cape Verde) CPV	Vagner	5	0	1+3	0	0+1	0	0	0
38	MF	(France) FRA	Rayan Souici	1	0	0+1	0	0	0	0	0
??	MF	(France) FRA	Dylan Chambost	1	0	0	0	0+1	0	0	0
Players away from AS Saint-Étienne on loan:
4	DF	(Switzerland) SUI	Léo Lacroix	13	0	8+3	0	1	0	1	0
9	FW	(France) FRA	Loïs Diony	17	0	11+5	0	1	0	0	0
13	MF	(Ivory Coast) CIV	Habib Maïga	14	2	7+6	1	1	1	0	0
Players who left AS Saint-Étienne during the season:
7	MF	(France) FRA	Bryan Dabo	17	2	15+1	2	1	0	0	0
19	DF	(Guinea) GUI	Florentin Pogba	6	0	4+1	0	1	0	0	0
23	FW	(Norway) NOR	Alexander Søderlund	14	0	2+10	0	1	0	1	0

=== Goalscorers ===
Place	Position	Nation	Number	Name	Ligue 1	Coupe de France	Coupe de la Ligue	Total
1	FW	(Slovenia)	27	Robert Berić	7	1	0	8
1	MF	(France)	14	Jonathan Bamba	7	1	0	8
3	MF	(France)	10	Rémy Cabella	7	0	0	7
4	FW	(France)	21	Romain Hamouma	5	0	0	5
5	DF	(France)	26	Mathieu Debuchy	4	0	0	4
5	MF	(Brazil)	20	Hernani	3	0	1	4
7	MF	(France)	5	Vincent Pajot	2	0	0	2
7	MF	(France)	7	Bryan Dabo	2	0	0	2
7	FW	(France)	22	Kévin Monnet-Paquet	2	0	0	2
7	DF	(Serbia)	28	Neven Subotić	2	0	0	2
7	MF	(Ivory Coast)	13	Habib Maïga	1	1	0	2
7				Own goal	2	0	0	2
13	DF	(Brazil)	11	Gabriel Silva	1	0	0	1
13	MF	(Senegal)	8	Assane Dioussé	1	0	0	1
13	FW	(France)	18	Paul-Georges Ntep	1	0	0	1
				TOTALS	47	3	1	51

=== Disciplinary record ===
Number	Nation	Position	Name	Ligue 1		Coupe de France		Coupe de la Ligue		Total	
Number	Nation	Position	Name	Yellow card	Red card	Yellow card	Red card	Yellow card	Red card	Yellow card	Red card
2	(France)	DF	Kévin Théophile-Catherine	6	0	0	0	0	0	6	0
5	(France)	MF	Vincent Pajot	4	1	0	0	0	0	4	1
6	(France)	MF	Yann M'Vila	1	0	0	0	0	0	1	0
7	(France)	FW	Paul-Georges Ntep	2	0	0	0	0	0	2	0
8	(Senegal)	MF	Assane Dioussé	4	0	0	0	0	0	4	0
10	(France)	MF	Rémy Cabella	3	0	0	0	0	0	3	0
11	(Brazil)	DF	Gabriel Silva	2	1	0	0	0	0	2	1
12	(Senegal)	DF	Cheikh M'Bengue	2	0	0	0	0	0	2	0
14	(France)	MF	Jonathan Bamba	1	0	0	0	0	0	1	0
15	(Switzerland)	DF	Saidy Janko	5	0	0	0	0	0	5	0
16	(France)	GK	Stéphane Ruffier	1	1	0	0	0	0	1	1
17	(Norway)	MF	Ole Selnæs	9	0	1	0	0	0	10	0
20	(Brazil)	MF	Hernani	3	2	1	0	1	0	5	2
21	(France)	FW	Romain Hamouma	4	0	0	0	0	0	4	0
24	(France)	DF	Loïc Perrin	3	0	0	0	0	0	3	0
26	(France)	DF	Mathieu Debuchy	1	0	0	0	0	0	1	0
28	(Serbia)	DF	Neven Subotić	1	0	0	0	0	0	1	0
29	(France)	DF	Ronaël Pierre-Gabriel	2	1	1	0	0	0	3	1
30	(France)	GK	Jessy Moulin	1	0	1	0	0	0	2	0
Players away on loan:
4	(Switzerland)	DF	Léo Lacroix	3	1	0	0	1	0	4	1
13	(Ivory Coast)	MF	Habib Maïga	2	0	0	0	0	0	2	0
Players who left AS Saint-Étienne during the season:
7	(France)	MF	Bryan Dabo	10	0	0	0	0	0	10	0
19	(Guinea)	DF	Florentin Pogba	1	0	1	0	0	0	2	0
23	(Norway)	FW	Alexander Søderlund	0	1	0	0	0	0	0	1
			TOTALS	71	8	5	0	2	0	78	8
