= Brandão (footballer, born 1980) =

Brazilian footballer (born 1980)

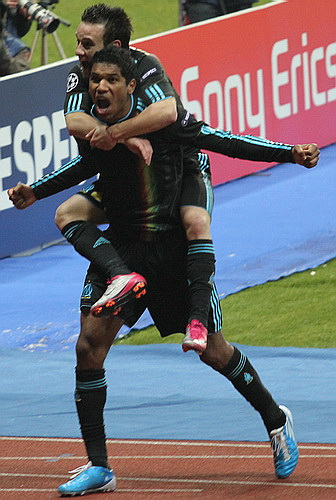
- Brandão (below) celebrating a goal for Marseille in 2010

Personal information
- Full name: Evaeverson Lemos da Silva
- Date of birth: 16 June 1980 (age 46)
- Place of birth: São Paulo, Brazil
- Height: 1.89 m (6 ft 2 in)
- Position: Striker

Senior career*
| Years | Team | Apps | (Gls) |
| 1998–2000 | Galo Maringá | 18 | (5) |
| 2000–2001 | União Bandeirante | 26 | (7) |
| 2001–2002 | Iraty | 20 | (7) |
| 2002 | → São Caetano (loan) | 23 | (10) |
| 2002–2009 | Shakhtar Donetsk | 140 | (65) |
| 2002–2003 | → Shakhtar-2 Donetsk | 5 | (3) |
| 2009–2012 | Marseille | 82 | (17) |
| 2011 | → Cruzeiro (loan) | 5 | (0) |
| 2011 | → Grêmio (loan) | 14 | (4) |
| 2012–2014 | Saint-Étienne | 53 | (16) |
| 2014–2016 | Bastia | 36 | (3) |
| 2016–2017 | Londrina | 1 | (0) |
| 2017 | → Tricordiano (loan) | 1 | (0) |
| 2017 | Levadiakos | 9 | (2) |
| Total | | 433 | (139) |
- * Club domestic league appearances and goals

Evaeverson Lemos da Silva (born 16 June 1980), commonly known as Brandão, is a Brazilian former footballer who played as a striker.

He spent most of his professional career with Shakhtar Donetsk, appearing in 220 competitive matches and scoring 91 goals while winning seven major titles. He also played several years in France, notably with Marseille where he won the Ligue 1 in 2009–10 amongst other accolades.

== Club career ==
=== Early years and Shakhtar ===
Born in São Paulo, Brandão only played with modest clubs in his country initially. In 2002, he signed with Ukrainian Premier League side FC Shakhtar Donetsk from Iraty Sport Club, going on to be an attacking mainstay over the course of the following seasons.

In a team filled with compatriots, Brandão scored a combined 39 goals in the three championships won by the club during that timeframe, notably topping the individual charts in the 2005–06 campaign at 15.

=== France ===
On 13 January 2009, Brandão left for France with Olympique de Marseille, netting eight times in 30 games in his first full season as they won the Ligue 1 trophy after an 18-year wait. He was loaned twice in his early stint to two teams in his homeland, Cruzeiro Esporte Clube and Grêmio Foot-Ball Porto Alegrense.

In January 2012, Brandão returned to L'OM, notably scoring in the 92nd minute of a 2–2 away draw against Inter Milan in the campaign's UEFA Champions League round-of-16 second leg, enabling his team to advance on the away goals rule and reach the quarter-finals of the competition for the first time since 1993. On 14 April he netted the game's only goal in the final of the Coupe de la Ligue, against Olympique Lyonnais in extra time.

Brandão was released in June 2012 along with Elinton Andrade, Djimi Traoré and Jean-Philippe Sabo and, two months later, signed with fellow league side AS Saint-Étienne on a two-year contract. On 20 April of the following year, again in the domestic league cup, he scored in the 1–0 victory over Stade Rennais F.C. to give his team their first piece of silverware since 1981.

In August 2014, Brandão joined SC Bastia also of the French top level after complicated negotiations between St-Étienne and Bastia, due to issues related to the transfer of Sylvain Marchal between the two clubs in July 2012. In the same month, after a league game against Paris Saint-Germain FC, he headbutted opposing player Thiago Motta and broke his nose, being provisionally suspended from 22 August pending a league disciplinary hearing and eventually receiving a six-month ban; on 27 November, he was jailed for one month for his attack in addition to receiving a €20,000 fine.

Brandão made his return on 11 April 2015, appearing as a late substitute as Bastia lost 0–4 to the same opponents in the French League Cup final. In February 2016, his prison sentence was changed on appeal to a five-year suspended sentence.

=== Later career ===
On 17 July 2017, Super League Greece club Levadiakos F.C. agreed terms with 37-year-old Brandão, who signed a one-year contract for an undisclosed fee from Londrina Esporte Clube.

== Personal life ==
Brandão successfully applied for French citizenship in May 2014.

== Career statistics ==
| Club | Season | League | | | National cup (Note: Includes Ukrainian Cup, Coupe de France) | | League cup (Note: Includes Coupe de la Ligue) | | Continental | | Other | | Total | |
| Club | Season | Division | Apps | Goals | Apps | Goals | Apps | Goals | Apps | Goals | Apps | Goals | Apps | Goals |
|---|---|---|---|---|---|---|---|---|---|---|---|---|---|---|
| Shakhtar Donetsk | 2002–03 | Vyshcha Liha | 18 | 4 | 6 | 1 | – | | 2 | 0 | – | | 26 | 5 |
| Shakhtar Donetsk | 2003–04 | Vyshcha Liha | 18 | 8 | 3 | 1 | – | | 5 | 1 | – | | 26 | 10 |
| Shakhtar Donetsk | 2004–05 | Vyshcha Liha | 21 | 12 | 5 | 5 | – | | 10 | 3 | – | | 36 | 20 |
| Shakhtar Donetsk | 2005–06 | Vyshcha Liha | 26 | 15 | 1 | 1 | – | | 9 (Note: Two appearances in UEFA Champions League, seven appearances and five goals in UEFA Cup) | 5 | – | | 36 | 21 |
| Shakhtar Donetsk | 2006–07 | Vyshcha Liha | 20 | 9 | 5 | 1 | – | | 10 (Note: Appearances in UEFA Champions League) | 0 | 1 (Note: Appearance in Ukrainian Super Cup) | 0 | 36 | 10 |
| Shakhtar Donetsk | 2007–08 | Vyshcha Liha | 25 | 12 | 3 | 2 | – | | 10 | 5 | 1 | 0 | 39 | 19 |
| Shakhtar Donetsk | 2008–09 | Ukrainian Premier League | 12 | 5 | 1 | 0 | – | | 7 | 1 | 1 | 0 | 21 | 6 |
| Shakhtar Donetsk | Total | | 140 | 65 | 24 | 11 | – | | 53 | 15 | 3 | 0 | 220 | 91 |
| Marseille | 2008–09 | Ligue 1 | 16 | 7 | 1 | 0 | 0 | 0 | – | | – | | 17 | 7 |
| Marseille | 2009–10 | Ligue 1 | 30 | 8 | 2 | 0 | 3 | 4 | 8 (Note: Six appearances and one goal in UEFA Champions League, two appearances in UEFA Europa League) | 1 | – | | 43 | 13 |
| Marseille | 2010–11 | Ligue 1 | 19 | 1 | 1 | 0 | 3 | 1 | 7 | 2 | 0 | 0 | 30 | 4 |
| Marseille | 2011–12 | Ligue 1 | 17 | 1 | 3 | 3 | 2 | 2 | 4 | 1 | 0 | 0 | 26 | 7 |
| Marseille | Total | | 82 | 17 | 7 | 3 | 8 | 7 | 19 | 4 | 0 | 0 | 116 | 31 |
| Cruzeiro (loan) | 2011 | Série A | 5 | 0 | 0 | 0 | – | | 0 | 0 | 1 | 0 | 6 | 0 |
| Grêmio (loan) | 2011 | Série A | 14 | 4 | 0 | 0 | – | | 1 | 0 | 0 | 0 | 15 | 4 |
| Saint-Étienne | 2012–13 | Ligue 1 | 27 | 11 | 3 | 1 | 5 | 2 | – | | – | | 35 | 14 |
| Saint-Étienne | 2013–14 | Ligue 1 | 26 | 5 | 1 | 1 | 1 | 0 | 4 (Note: Appearances in UEFA Europa League) | 3 | – | | 32 | 9 |
| Saint-Étienne | Total | | 53 | 16 | 4 | 2 | 6 | 2 | 4 | 3 | – | | 67 | 23 |
| Bastia | 2014–15 | Ligue 1 | 9 | 0 | 0 | 0 | 1 | 0 | – | | – | | 10 | 0 |
| Bastia | 2015–16 | Ligue 1 | 27 | 3 | 2 | 1 | 0 | 0 | – | | – | | 29 | 4 |
| Bastia | Total | | 36 | 3 | 2 | 1 | 1 | 0 | – | | – | | 39 | 4 |
| Levadiakos | 2017–18 | Super League Greece | 9 | 2 | 0 | 0 | – | | – | | – | | 9 | 2 |
| Career total | | | 339 | 107 | 37 | 17 | 15 | 9 | 77 | 22 | 19 | 9 | 472 | 155 |

== Honours ==
Shakhtar

- Vyshcha Liha: 2004–05, 2005–06, 2007–08
- Ukrainian Cup: 2003–04, 2007–08
- Ukrainian Super Cup: 2005, 2008

Marseille

- Ligue 1: 2009–10
- Coupe de la Ligue: 2009–10, 2010–11, 2011–12

Saint-Étienne

- Coupe de la Ligue: 2012–13

Individual

- Ukrainian Premier League top goalscorers: 2005–06

== Coaching Career ==
A professional with extensive experience in football, including solid experience as a player in European clubs, where he developed a deep understanding of different game models, tactical cultures, and the competitive demands of the international scene.

After ending his playing career, he focused his training on the technical area, obtaining all the CBF Academy certifications such as:

- License B;
- License A;
- License PRO;

In addition to the CONMEBOL PRO License.

He complements his qualifications with the following Licenses:

- UEFA A;
- UEFA B;

Acquired in Europe. Consolidating a comprehensive, up-to-date methodological base aligned with the best practices in world football.

As a coach, he has accumulated relevant experience in different competitive contexts.

In 2019 he was Head Coach of Londrina Esporte Clube - Under-17;

In 2022/2023 he was Assistant Coach of the Londrina Esporte Clube professional team;

(2024) - Assistant Coach of R.E. Virton (Belgium) – professional team;

(2025) - Head Coach of Racing Union Luxembourg - Under-23;

In these roles, he structured game models, lead athlete training and development processes, managed groups in official competitions and implemented modern training methodologies.
