= Anthony Maisonnial =

French footballer (born 1998)

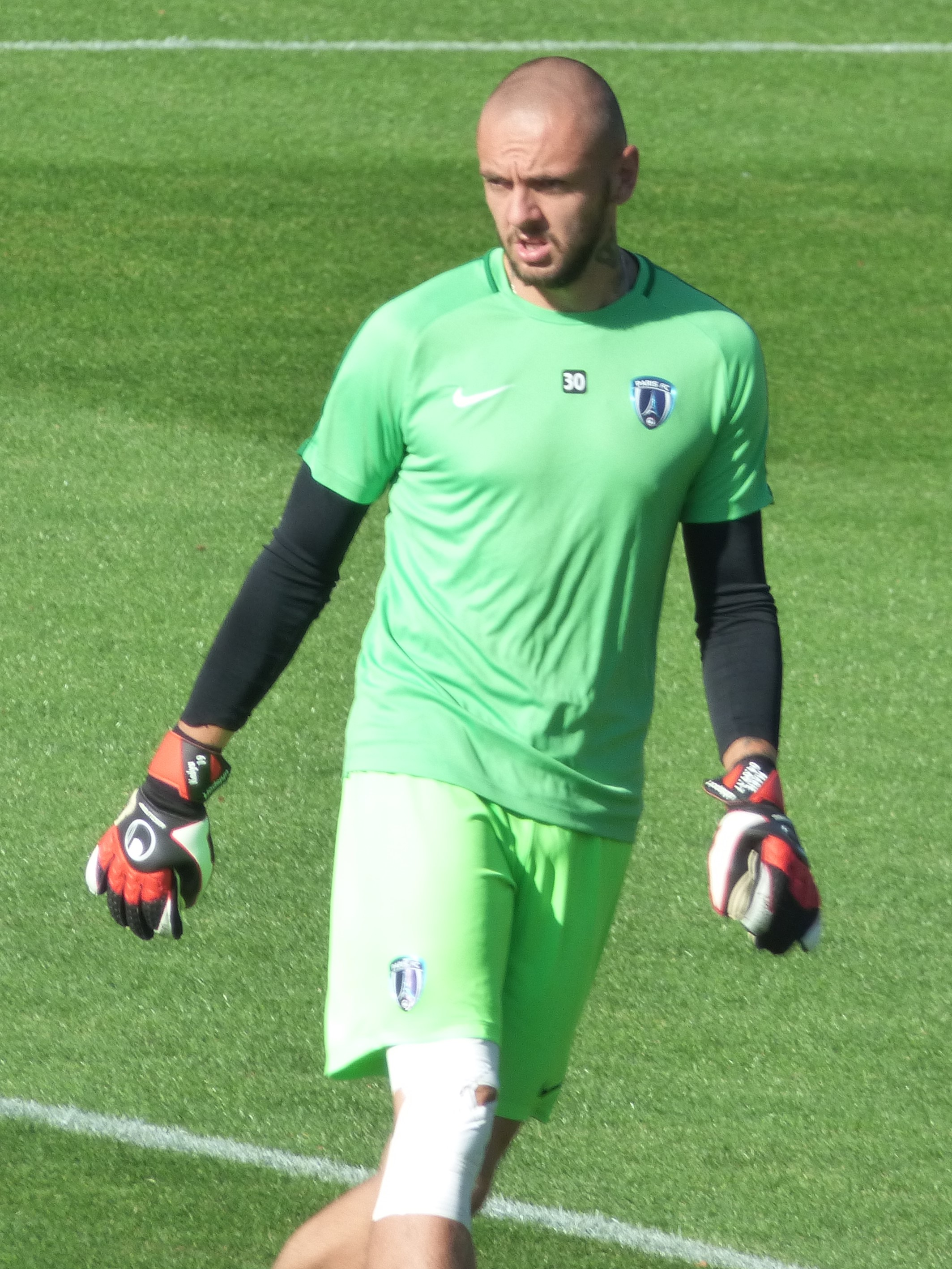
- Maisonnial with Paris FC in 2020

Personal information
- Date of birth: 23 March 1998 (age 28)
- Place of birth: Saint-Priest-en-Jarez, France
- Height: 1.88 m (6 ft 2 in)
- Position: Goalkeeper

Youth career
- 2004–2008: AS Saint-Galmier
- 2008–2016: Saint-Étienne

Senior career*
Years	Team	Apps	(Gls)
2015–2018	Saint-Étienne B	33	(0)
2016–2018	Saint-Étienne	2	(0)
2018–2019	Sion	1	(0)
2019–2021	Paris FC	11	(0)
2021–2022	Bourg-en-Bresse	35	(0)
2022–2024	Andrézieux	55	(0)
2024–2025	Bastia	0	(0)
2024–2025	Bastia B	9	(0)

International career
2013–2014	France U16	7	(0)
2014	France U17	1	(0)
2016	France U18	1	(0)
2016–2017	France U19	5	(0)
2017	France U20	1	(0)
- * Club domestic league appearances and goals as of 17 May 2025

Anthony Maisonnial (born 23 March 1998) is a French professional footballer who plays as a goalkeeper. He has played for France national youth teams starting from the France under-16 national team.

== Club career ==
=== Saint-Étienne ===
Born and raised in Saint-Étienne, and an all-time fan of his forming club, Maisonnial is a product of Saint-Étienne's youth academy. He made his debut for the Ligue 1 side on 17 December 2016 against Lorient replacing Robert Berič in the 13th minute after keeper Jessy Moulin was sent off in a 2–1 away loss. At the end of the 2017–18 season, Maisonnial did not renew his first professional contract.

=== Sion ===
In May 2018, it was announced Maisonnial would join Sion for the 2018–19 season having agreed to a four-year contract. In his first game for Sion, he conceded a goal from over 82 meters. That meant the end of his career at Sion.

=== Paris FC ===
In July 2019 Maisonnial was able to terminate his contract with Sion and sign a two-year deal with Paris FC in Ligue 2. After eleven league starts before Christmas in 2019, Maisonnial made way for a back-to-form Vincent Demarconnay and was relegated to the bench. He agreed the termination of his contract on 4 January 2021.

=== Bourg-en-Bresse ===
On 5 January 2021, Maisonnial signed with Championnat National side Bourg-en-Bresse, a club with close ties to his agent.

=== Andrézieux ===
On 5 July 2022, Maisonnial joined Andrézieux in Championnat National 2.
