= Bryan Dabo =

Footballer (born 1992)

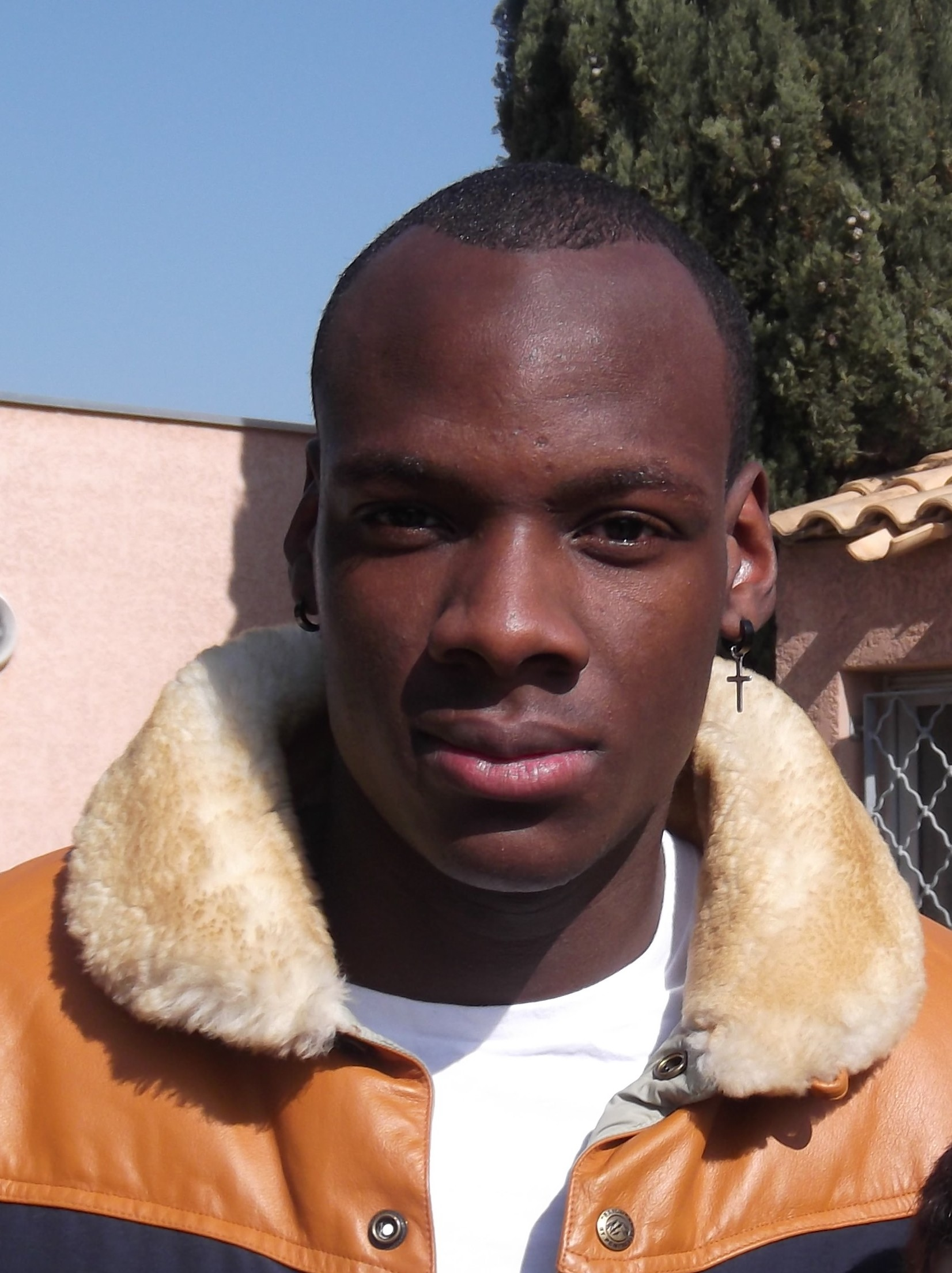
- Dabo in 2013

Personal information
- Full name: Bryan Boulaye Kevin Dabo
- Date of birth: 18 February 1992 (age 34)
- Place of birth: Marseille, France
- Height: 1.87 m (6 ft 2 in)
- Position: Midfielder

Youth career
- 2000–2006: Burel FC
- 2006–2007: Aubagne
- 2007–2010: Montpellier

Senior career*
Years	Team	Apps	(Gls)
2010–2016	Montpellier	76	(7)
2012–2014	Montpellier B	21	(1)
2014	→ Blackburn Rovers (loan)	0	(0)
2016–2018	Saint-Étienne	30	(2)
2018–2020	Fiorentina	33	(2)
2020	→ SPAL (loan)	16	(1)
2020–2021	Benevento	25	(0)
2021–2022	Çaykur Rizespor	19	(0)
2022–2023	Aris	27	(1)
2023–2025	Sepahan	42	(0)

International career^{‡}
2013	France U21	1	(0)
2018–	Burkina Faso	19	(2)
- * Club domestic league appearances and goals as of 1 January 2024 ‡ National team caps and goals as of 24 March 2022

Bryan Boulaye Kevin Dabo (born 18 February 1992) is a professional footballer who plays as a midfielder for Sepahan in the Persian Gulf Pro League. Born in France, he represents the Burkina Faso national team.

== Club career ==
=== Montpellier ===
Dabo made his professional debut with Montpellier on 16 May 2010 in a 3–1 win against Paris Saint-Germain coming on as an 84th-minute substitute for Geoffrey Dernis. He made his first start against Bastia.

==== Blackburn Rovers (loan) ====
On 28 January 2014, Dabo signed for Championship club Blackburn Rovers on loan with an option of a permanent deal. He was an unused substitute in a 2–0 win against Blackpool. He played the full 90 minutes for Blackburn Rovers U21 against Tottenham U21.

=== Saint-Étienne ===
In June 2016, Dabo joined Montpellier's league rivals AS Saint-Étienne on a four-year contract.

=== Fiorentina ===
On 30 January 2018, he joined Fiorentina, signing a three-and-a-half-year contract. He scored his first Serie A goal in a 3–2 away win against Genoa, netting the winner. His second goal came in the 2018/2019 season, in a 3–1 victory in the derby against Empoli.

==== Loan to SPAL ====
On 13 January 2020, he joined SPAL on loan with an option to purchase.

=== Benevento ===
In September 2020, Dabo joined newly promoted side Benevento on a permanent deal. He signed a 2-year deal with the Stregoni.

=== Çaykur Rizespor ===
On 19 July 2021, he signed a three-year contract with an additional one-year option with Turkish club Çaykur Rizespor.

=== Aris ===
On 5 July 2022, Dabo joined Aris on a two-year deal.

== International career ==
Dabo was born in France to a Burkinabé father and a Malian mother. He represented the France national under-21 football team once, in a friendly in 2013. He was called up to the Burkina Faso national football team, and the Mali national football team in 2016. He officially accept his first call up to senior national team in March 2018, and made his debut for Burkina Faso on 22 March 2018.

== Personal life ==
On 21 November 2020 he tested positive for COVID-19.

Outside of his playing career, Dabo established and leads the football agency "La Source Management", which focuses on representing and developing young football talents.

== Career statistics ==
=== Club ===
As of match played 1 January 2024.

Appearances and goals by club, season and competition
Club	Season	League			National Cup		League Cup		Continental		Other		Total	
Club	Season	Division	Apps	Goals	Apps	Goals	Apps	Goals	Apps	Goals	Apps	Goals	Apps	Goals
Montpellier	2009–10	Ligue 1	1	0	—		—		—		—		1	0
Montpellier	2011–12	Ligue 1	0	0	0	0	0	0	—		—		0	0
Montpellier	2012–13	Ligue 1	16	0	2	0	1	0	—		—		19	0
Montpellier	2013–14	Ligue 1	2	0	0	0	0	0	—		—		2	0
Montpellier	2014–15	Ligue 1	21	2	1	0	0	0	—		—		22	2
Montpellier	2015–16	Ligue 1	36	5	2	0	1	0	—		—		39	5
Montpellier	Total		76	7	5	0	2	0	—		—		83	7
Blackburn (loan)	2013–14	Championship	0	0	0	0	0	0	—		—		0	0
Saint-Étienne	2016–17	Ligue 1	14	0	2	0	1	0	5	0	—		22	0
Saint-Étienne	2017–18	Ligue 1	16	2	1	0	0	0	—		—		17	2
Saint-Étienne	Total		30	2	3	0	1	0	5	0	—		39	2
Fiorentina	2017–18	Serie A	10	1	—		—		—		—		10	1
Fiorentina	2018–19	Serie A	23	1	3	0	—		—		—		26	1
Fiorentina	Total		33	2	3	0	—		—		—		36	2
SPAL (loan)	2019–20	Serie A	16	1	1	0	—		—		—		17	1
Benevento (loan)	2020–21	Serie A	25	0	0	0	—		—		—		25	0
Çaykur Rizespor	2021–22	Süper Lig	18	0	0	0	—		—		—		18	0
Aris	2022–23	Superleague Greece	27	1	2	0	—		4	0	—		33	1
Sepahan	2023–24	Pro League	9	0	0	0	—		4	0	—		13	0
Career total			234	13	14	0	3	0	13	0	0	0	264	13

=== International goals ===
Scores and results list Burkina Faso's goal tally first.

No.	Date	Venue	Opponent	Score	Result	Competition
1	9 October 2020	Stade El Abdi, El Jadida, Morocco	DR Congo	2–0	3–0	Friendly
2	12 November 2020	Stade du 4 Août, Ouagadougou, Burkina Faso	Malawi	3–1	3–1	2021 Africa Cup of Nations qualification

== Honours ==
Sepahan

- Iranian Hazfi Cup: 2023–24
- Iranian Super Cup: 2024
