= Florentin Pogba =

Guinean footballer (born 1990)

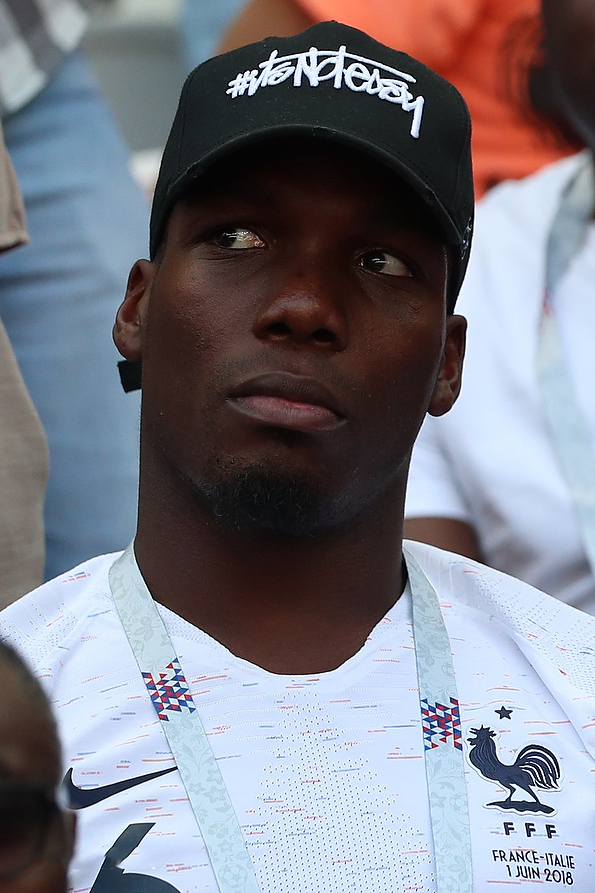
- Pogba at a 2018 FIFA World Cup match

Personal information
- Full name: Peïlé Florentin Pogba
- Date of birth: 19 August 1990 (age 36)
- Place of birth: Conakry, Guinea
- Height: 1.89 m (6 ft 2 in)
- Position: Centre-back

Team information
- Current team: Stade Poitevin
- Number: 19

Youth career
- 2007–2009: Celta Vigo
- 2009–2011: Sedan

Senior career*
Years	Team	Apps	(Gls)
2010–2012	Sedan	45	(4)
2012–2018	Saint-Étienne	99	(2)
2012–2013	→ Sedan (loan)	34	(3)
2018	Gençlerbirliği	9	(0)
2019	Atlanta United	22	(0)
2019	Atlanta United 2	4	(0)
2020–2022	Sochaux	65	(0)
2022–2023	Mohun Bagan SG	5	(0)
2024–2025	R.E. Virton	30	(6)
2025–	Stade Poitevin	7	(0)

International career
2011–2012	France U20	3	(0)
2010–2021	Guinea	31	(0)
- * Club domestic league appearances and goals as of 4 December 2025

Peïlé Florentin Pogba (born 19 August 1990) is a Guinean professional footballer who plays as a defender for French side Stade Poitevin. His twin brother Mathias and younger brother Paul are both professional footballers.

== Early life ==
Pogba was born in Conakry, the capital of Guinea. His family moved to Roissy-en-Brie in France when he was eight months old.

Pogba has two brothers who are also professional footballers. His twin brother, Mathias, most recently played for ASM Belfort, while his younger brother, Paul, plays for Ligue 1 club Monaco and the France national football team.

He grew up supporting Arsenal, following their invincible season.

== Club career ==
=== Sedan ===
Pogba began his youth career playing for several clubs in Île-de-France. It was here that he came to the attention of Spanish side Celta Vigo and signed for them in 2007, although he never made an appearance for their senior team. After spending two seasons in the youth ranks at Celta, he had a trial with Sedan in August 2009. After a successful trial, he joined up with Sedan's reserve team, and after one season in the reserves, he signed his first professional contract in March 2010. On 20 November 2010, Pogba made his first appearance with the first team in a 2–0 win against amateur side FC Steinseltz in the Coupe de France. A few months later, on 5 February 2011, he made his league debut in a 1–0 defeat against Boulogne. Despite the result, Pogba's performance was praised, and he kept his place in the team. On 20 September, in the following season, he scored his first goal for Sedan, a header from a corner against Troyes.

=== Saint-Étienne ===
On the final day of the summer transfer window in 2012, Pogba was transferred to AS Saint-Étienne for a fee of €500,000. He was then immediately loaned back to Sedan for the remainder of the 2012–13 season. After returning to Saint-Étienne in 2013, he initially struggled to break into the team in his first season with the club. He scored his first goal for the club on 3 December, in a 2–0 win against Montpellier HSC. By this time, he had well and truly established himself as the first choice centre-back at the club, displacing long time Saint-Étienne defender Loïc Perrin. Pogba picked up a serious injury whilst on international duty with Guinea. It was initially feared that he would miss the rest of the season, but he returned against Nice in the 36th match week of the season.

=== Gençlerbirliği ===
In January 2018, after 86 appearances and 3 goals for Saint-Étienne, Pogba was transferred to Turkish club Gençlerbirliği on a short-term contract. On 6 May 2018, Pogba was involved in a confrontation with teammates during a crucial game against Antalyaspor. Gençlerbirliği were losing 1–0 when Pogba limped off the pitch and took off his shirt in the 88th minute. The Ankara side, fighting to avoid relegation, had already used the allowed three substitutions. Gençlerbirliği's captain, Ahmet Oğuz, furious that he was going to leave them with ten men, confronted Pogba, who turned around and walked on to face his teammate as other players and staff were forced to separate the duo. He became a free agent upon the expiry of his contract.

=== Atlanta United ===
In January 2019, Pogba went on trial with Spanish Segunda División club Elche. He impressed during his trial and was set to sign with the club but a registration hitch meant he was unable to.

A month later, Pogba signed for Major League Soccer club Atlanta United FC, following a preseason session with the team. He made his first team debut in a 1–0 victory against Vancouver Whitecaps on 16 May. He started and played the full match as Atlanta recorded their fifth clean sheet, winning all 5 games in the process, setting a new MLS record. In the 2019 Campeones Cup against Club América on 14 August, Pogba earned a penalty for Atlanta that was converted by Josef Martínez and sealed a 3–2 victory.

In the final of the U.S. Open Cup against Minnesota United on 27 August, Pogba played at center-back as Atlanta won 2–1 and secured their second trophy of the season.

On 21 November, it was announced that Atlanta had declined the option to extend Pogba's contract into the 2020 season due to the uncertainty around the collective bargaining agreement, meaning that he became a free agent.

=== Sochaux ===
On 18 May 2020, it was announced that Pogba had signed a three-year contract with Ligue 2 side Sochaux, pending a physical.

=== Mohun Bagan SG ===
On 24 June 2022, Indian Super League club Mohun Bagan SG completed the signing of Pogba on a two-year deal. He made his debut for the club on 20 August against Rajasthan United at the 131st edition of Durand Cup as his team lost the match by 3–2.

=== R.E. Virton ===
On 25 July 2024, Pogba joined Belgian side R.E. Virton.

=== Stade Poitevin ===
On 7 August 2025, Pogba joined French National club Stade Poitevin on a free transfer.

== International career ==
Pogba was handed his first call up to the Guinea squad by Michel Dussuyer ahead of a friendly match against Mali on 11 August 2010. He made his international debut in the second half of the game, helping his team to a 2–0 victory.

Nine months later, Pogba accepted a call-up to play for the France under-20 team in the 2011 Toulon Tournament. Pogba was allowed to do this because FIFA's regulations allow players with dual nationality to change their allegiance if they haven't yet played a competitive match for a country, which he hadn't yet done with Guinea. France went on to reach the final, but lost out to the Colombia under-20 team 3–1 on penalties; Pogba was one of three French players to miss their penalty.

On 24 March 2013, Pogba pledged his international future to Guinea, and he played his first competitive game for them in a 2014 World Cup qualifying match against Mozambique. After struggling to play regular club football in the 2013–14 season, he also struggled to get into the Guinea team. However, after forcing his way into the Saint-Étienne side during the following season, he was able to return to his place in the Guinea team.

In December 2014, Pogba was named in the final 23-man roster for Guinea at the 2015 Africa Cup of Nations. Pogba played the full 90 minutes of their first group match, a 1–1 draw against Ivory Coast, and started the second match against Cameroon, before being substituted just before half-time with a thigh injury. He did not feature again for Guinea as they lost in the quarter-finals to Ghana.

Pogba was recalled to the national team in October 2019 by new manager Didier Six.

== Career statistics ==
=== Club ===
As of 28 September 2024

Appearances and goals by club, season and competition
Club	Season	League			National cup (Note: Includes Coupe de France, Turkish Cup, U.S. Open Cup, Super Cup)		League cup (Note: Includes Coupe de la Ligue, Durand Cup)		Continental		Total	
Club	Season	Division	Apps	Goals	Apps	Goals	Apps	Goals	Apps	Goals	Apps	Goals
Sedan	2010–11	Ligue 2	13	0	0	0	0	0	—		13	0
Sedan	2011–12	Ligue 2	32	4	1	0	3	0	—		36	4
Sedan	Total		45	4	1	0	3	0	0	0	49	4
Saint-Étienne	2013–14	Ligue 1	4	0	1	0	0	0	—		5	0
Saint-Étienne	2014–15	Ligue 1	16	1	1	0	1	0	6 (Note: Appearances in UEFA Europa League)	0	24	1
Saint-Étienne	2015–16	Ligue 1	24	0	3	0	0	0	8	0	35	0
Saint-Étienne	2016–17	Ligue 1	17	1	0	0	1	0	11	1	29	2
Saint-Étienne	2017–18	Ligue 1	5	0	1	0	0	0	—		6	0
Saint-Étienne	Total		66	2	6	0	2	0	25	1	99	3
Sedan (loan)	2012–13	Ligue 2	34	3	3	0	1	0	—		38	3
Gençlerbirliği	2017–18	Süper Lig	8	0	1	0	—		—		9	0
Atlanta United	2019	Major League Soccer	16	0	4	0	0	0	2 (Note: One appearances in CONCACAF Champions League, one appearance in Campeones Cup)	0	22	0
Atlanta United 2	2019	USL Championship	4	0	0	0	0	0	—		4	0
Sochaux	2020–21	Ligue 2	30	0	0	0	—		—		30	0
Sochaux	2021–22	Ligue 2	33	0	2	0	—		—		35	0
Sochaux	Total		63	0	2	0	0	0	0	0	65	0
Mohun Bagan SG	2022–23	Indian Super League	2	0	3	0	3	0	—		8	0
R.E. Virton	2024-25	Nationale 1	5	1	0	0	—		—		5	1
Career total			243	10	20	0	8	0	27	1	299	11

=== International ===
As of match played 9 October 2021

Appearances and goals by national team and year
National team	Year	Apps	Goals
Guinea	2010	1	0
Guinea	2013	3	0
Guinea	2014	4	0
Guinea	2015	6	0
Guinea	2016	2	0
Guinea	2017	4	0
Guinea	2018	1	0
Guinea	2019	2	0
Guinea	2020	2	0
Guinea	2021	6	0
Total		31	0

== Honours ==
Atlanta United

- U.S. Open Cup: 2019
- Campeones Cup: 2019
