= Stéphane Ruffier =

French footballer (born 1986)

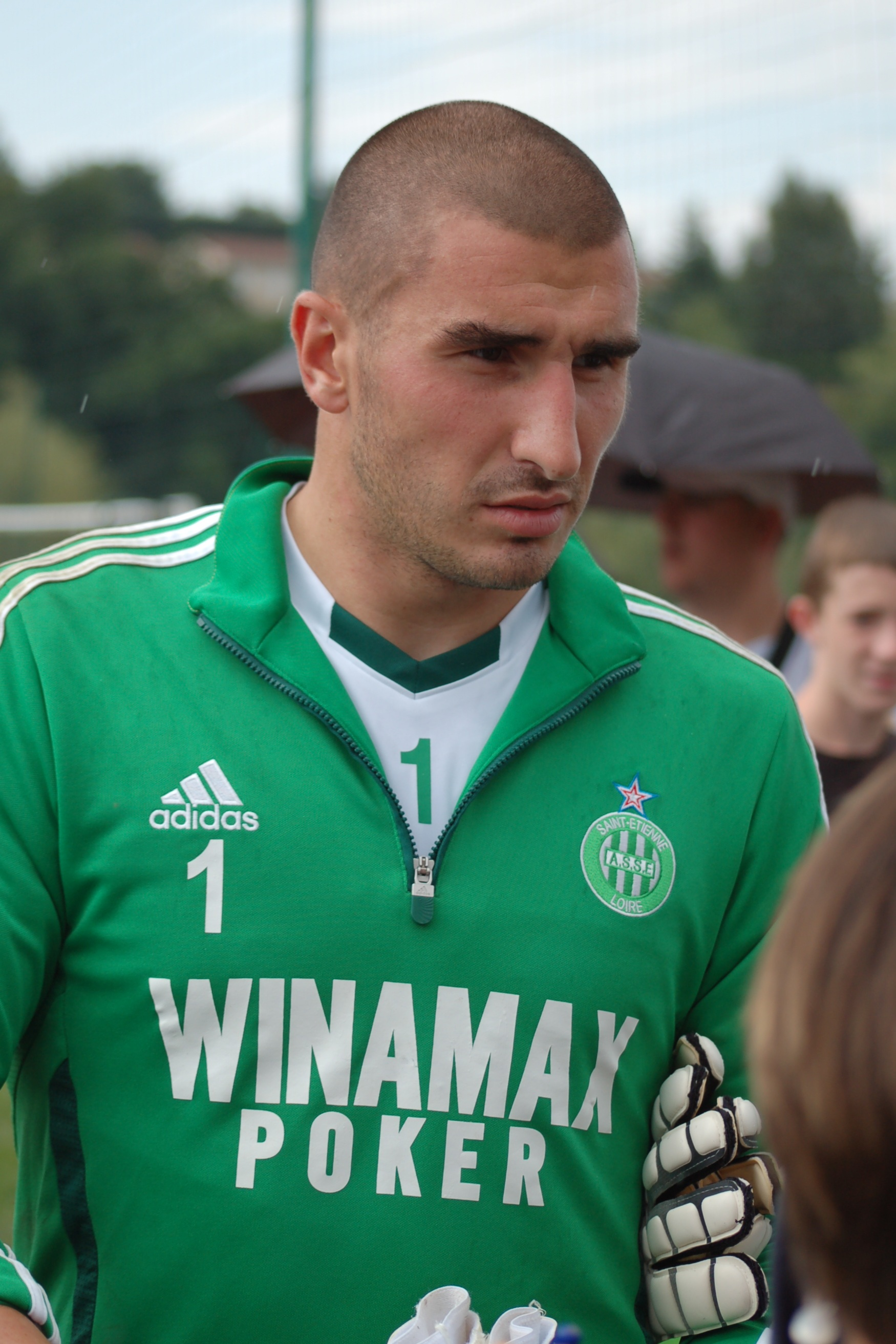
- Ruffier with Saint-Étienne in 2011

Personal information
- Full name: Stéphane Ruffier
- Date of birth: 27 September 1986 (age 40)
- Place of birth: Bayonne, Pyrénées-Atlantiques, France
- Height: 1.88 m (6 ft 2 in)
- Position: Goalkeeper

Youth career
- 1992–2002: Bayonne
- 2002–2005: Monaco

Senior career*
Years	Team	Apps	(Gls)
2005–2011	Monaco	113	(0)
2005–2006	→ Bayonne (loan)	38	(0)
2011–2021	Saint-Étienne	315	(0)
Total		466	(0)

International career
2007–2008	France U21	8	(0)
2010–2015	France	3	(0)
- * Club domestic league appearances and goals

Stéphane Ruffier (born 27 September 1986) is a French former professional footballer who played as a goalkeeper.

A former captain for both Monaco and Saint-Étienne, Ruffier made 428 appearances in Ligue 1 during his career. He is also a former French international, having earned three caps for the national team between 2010 and 2015 and been named to the 2014 FIFA World Cup squad.

== Club career ==
=== Early life and career ===
Ruffier was born on 27 September 1986 in Bayonne, Pyrénées-Atlantiques, to Jean-François Ruffier, a world champion in the sport of Basque pelota, and Patricia Ruffier. He has two sisters, one of which is a figure skater. Ruffier is of Basque descent having been born and raised in the heart of French Basque Country. Despite emulating his father's skills in Basque pelota as a child, Ruffier grew an attraction to the sport of football and joined the football section of the Aviron Bayonnais sporting club at the age of six. He entered the academy initially as an outfield player and was training to become a striker. However, at the age of eight, due to a goalkeeper shortage at the academy, Ruffier was asked by a youth coach to try out for the position. The transition was a success and, by the age of 13, Ruffier had acquired the physical skills and traits needed to excel at the position.

While in the youth system of Bayonne, Ruffier helped the club's under-13 team win the Coupe de Pyrénées. The following season, he attended a trial session with professional club Montpellier, but ultimately failed to impress. In 2002, Ruffier was spotted by Monaco scout Arnold Catalano. Catalano is known for recruiting Thierry Henry to the club and recommended Ruffier join Monaco on a trial. On 2 August 2002, after a successful trial with the club, Ruffier signed an aspirant (youth trainee) contract with the club.

=== Monaco ===
Upon his arrival to the club, Ruffier was inserted into the team's youth academy and honed his skills as a goalkeeper under the watch of goalkeeper coaches Jean-Luc Ettori, André Amitrano, and André Biancarelli. After spending only one season in the club's academy, he was promoted to the club's Championnat de France amateur team in the fourth division. Ruffier made ten appearances with the team during the 2003–04 season, and for the 2004–05 season, was named as first-choice goalkeeper of the amateur team and made 17 appearances. Following the season, Monaco loaned Ruffier back to his former club Bayonne with hopes that the youngster would get some consistent first-team playing time. At the club, Ruffier was installed as the team's first-choice goalkeeper by manager Christian Sarramagna. He responded by playing in all 38 league matches, but could not prevent the team from suffering relegation to the CFA as the club finished in 17th position. Following the campaign, Ruffier returned to Monaco.

On 10 May 2006, Ruffier signed his first professional contract with Monaco agreeing to a three-year deal until June 2009. He was moved into the backup goalkeeper position behind the Italian Flavio Roma. Due to Roma's consistency in goal, Ruffier made no appearances in the 2006–07 season. The following season, Roma suffered an injury in the team's third league match of the season against Metz. Ruffier made his professional debut in the match appearing as a substitute in the 58th minute for Roma and maintained the team's 1–0 lead. Monaco later scored another goal to record a 2–0 victory. In the team's next three matches, Ruffier played the full 90 minutes in victories over Sochaux, Le Mans, and Lille. He finished the campaign with 12 total appearances, ten in the league and two in the Coupe de France. In the 2008–09 Ligue 1 season, manager Ricardo Gomes decided to retain Ruffier as the team's number one goalkeeper. Ruffier appeared in 36 total matches recording eleven clean sheets, which included blanking Paris Saint-Germain on two occasions and holding off Marseille at the Stade Vélodrome with the hosts outshooting Monaco 22–4. He also helped the team reach the semi-finals of the Coupe de France. During the season, on 15 September 2008, Ruffier signed a contract extension with Monaco until 2010. At the end of the season, he signed another extension with the club, this time until June 2013.

In the 2009–10 campaign, Ruffier recorded 15 clean sheets in 32 matches in league play. In the Coupe de France, he earned three clean sheets as Monaco reached the 2010 edition of the cup's final match. In the final, Ruffier maintained a clean sheet for over an hour and a half before conceding a Guillaume Hoarau header in extra time. On 27 July 2010, Ruffier was named captain of Monaco by manager Guy Lacombe for the 2010–11 season. In the opening match of the season against Olympique Lyonnais, Ruffier dueled with French international and first-choice goalkeeper Hugo Lloris. Both keepers performed well producing equally good saves in a 0–0 draw. During a match against Saint-Étienne which resulted in a 1–1 draw, Ruffier suffered a groin injury that ended his season prematurely. Ruffier's absence contributed to AS Monaco finishing 18th and being relegated to Ligue 2.

=== Saint-Étienne ===
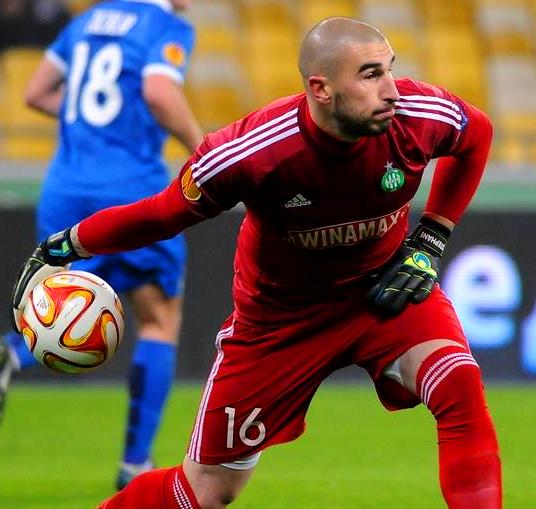
Ruffier playing for Saint-Étienne in 2014

Following AS Monaco's relegation to Ligue 2, Ruffier was linked with clubs like Manchester City and Saint Etienne but Ruffier rejected Manchester City because he did not feel City could offer him the same playing opportunities as Les Verts. On 7 August 2011, Ruffier made his debut for Saint-Étienne in a 2–1 away win over Bordeaux and received a yellow card during the match. In September 2014 Ruffier penned a new four-year deal with the club that would keep him at Saint-Étienne until 2018.

On 24 November 2019, Ruffier played every minute of his 303rd Ligue 1 match for Saint-Étienne in the 0–0 home draw with Montpellier, equalling former Saint-Étienne goalkeeper Ivan Ćurković's nearly-four-decades-long record as the goalkeeper who made the most number of appearances for the club in Ligue 1.

In the latter half of the 2019–20 campaign, Ruffier came into conflict with manager Claude Puel after being dropped from the starting lineup in favour of Jessy Moulin. In August, Puel confirmed that he was out of the club's plans for the upcoming season. On 4 January 2021, Saint-Étienne announced the termination of his contract.

On 13 January 2021, Ruffier announced he had retired from football and joined his hometown team Bayonne as a youth educator.

== International career ==
During Ruffier's development at Monaco, he was absent from the France youth national teams. After receiving consistent playing time at Monaco, Ruffier was called up to the under-21 team in November 2007. On 15 November 2007, he made his under-21 debut playing the entire match in the team's 1–1 draw with Armenia in Colmar. He appeared in several matches for the team in qualification for the 2009 UEFA European Under-21 Championship, but ultimately failed to make the squad that lost 2–1 on aggregate to Germany in the team's two-legged playoff match. The elimination from the competition ended Ruffier's under-21 career.

During the 2009–10 season, Ruffier earned praise from the media for his performances. The praise led to calls for the player to be called up to the senior team. However, coach Raymond Domenech preferred Cédric Carrasso as the team's third-choice keeper and took him, along with Lloris and Steve Mandanda to the 2010 FIFA World Cup. On 16 June 2010, goalkeeper Carrasso dropped out of the team due to injury and the national team's goalkeeper coach Bruno Martini contacted Ruffier to travel to South Africa and replace him. Despite FIFA denying the team's request of a replacement player, Ruffier still trained with the team and was on the team bus during the player boycott to protest the dismissal of striker Nicolas Anelka. On 23 July 2010, following a meeting by the Federal Council of the French Football Federation, all 23 players in the World Cup squad were suspended for the team's upcoming 11 August friendly match against Norway on request of new coach Laurent Blanc. The move placed Ruffier in limbo as he was not formally a part of the team, but was on the bus during the player boycott. On 5 August 2010, Ruffier was called up to the senior team officially for the first time by Laurent Blanc for the team's friendly against Norway. Ruffier expressed gratitude towards Laurent Blanc thanking him for the opportunity. He also stated that, before the announcement of the squad, Blanc had contacted him to explain why he was not a part of the strike.

== Career statistics ==
=== Club ===
Appearances and goals by club, season and competition
Club	Season	League			National Cup		League Cup		Europe		Total	
Club	Season	Division	Apps	Goals	Apps	Goals	Apps	Goals	Apps	Goals	Apps	Goals
Monaco	2006–07	Ligue 1	0	0	3	0	0	0	—		3	0
Monaco	2007–08	Ligue 1	10	0	2	0	0	0	—		12	0
Monaco	2008–09	Ligue 1	32	0	4	0	0	0	—		36	0
Monaco	2009–10	Ligue 1	37	0	6	0	1	0	—		44	0
Monaco	2010–11	Ligue 1	34	0	1	0	3	0	—		38	0
Monaco	Total		113	0	16	0	4	0	—		133	0
Bayonne (loan)	2005–06	Championnat National	38	0	2	0	0	0	—		40	0
Saint-Étienne	2011–12	Ligue 1	38	0	1	0	2	0	—		41	0
Saint-Étienne	2012–13	Ligue 1	38	0	3	0	5	0	—		46	0
Saint-Étienne	2013–14	Ligue 1	38	0	0	0	1	0	4	0	43	0
Saint-Étienne	2014–15	Ligue 1	38	0	8	0	2	0	5	0	53	0
Saint-Étienne	2015–16	Ligue 1	38	0	4	0	0	0	11	0	53	0
Saint-Étienne	2016–17	Ligue 1	31	0	0	0	1	0	9	0	41	0
Saint-Étienne	2017–18	Ligue 1	35	0	0	0	1	0	—		36	0
Saint-Étienne	2018–19	Ligue 1	37	0	2	0	1	0	—		40	0
Saint-Étienne	2019–20	Ligue 1	22	0	4	0	0	0	4	0	30	0
Saint-Étienne	2020–21	Ligue 1	0	0	0	0	—		—		0	0
Saint-Étienne	Total		315	0	22	0	13	0	33	0	383	0
Career total			466	0	40	0	17	0	33	0	556	0

=== International ===
National team	Year	Apps	Goals
France	2010	1	0
France	2014	1	0
France	2015	1	0
Total		3	0

== Honours ==
Saint-Étienne

- Coupe de la Ligue: 2012–13
- Coupe de France runner-up: 2019–20
