= 2012–13 AS Saint-Étienne season =

AS Saint-Étienne
2012–13 season
- Presidents: Bernard Caïazzo; Roland Romeyer
- Head coach: Christophe Galtier
- Stadium: Stade Geoffroy-Guichard
- Ligue 1: 5th
- Coupe de France: Quarter-finals
- Coupe de la Ligue: Winners
- Top goalscorer: League: Pierre-Emerick Aubameyang (19); All: Pierre-Emerick Aubameyang (21)
Home colours	Away colours

The 2012–13 season was the 79th season in the existence of AS Saint-Étienne and the club's ninth consecutive season in the top flight of French football. In addition to the domestic league, Saint-Étienne participated in this season's editions of the Coupe de France and the Coupe de la Ligue. The season covered the period from 1 July 2012 to 30 June 2013.

== Players ==
=== First-team squad ===
Note: Flags indicate national team as defined under FIFA eligibility rules; some limited exceptions apply. Players may hold more than one non-FIFA nationality.

No.	Pos.	Nation	Player
4	DF	FRA	Kurt Zouma
6	MF	FRA	Jérémy Clément
7	FW	GAB	Pierre-Emerick Aubameyang
9	FW	CIV	Max Gradel
10	MF	FRA	Renaud Cohade
11	MF	FRA	Yohan Mollo (on loan from Nancy)
12	DF	FRA	Jean-Pascal Mignot
13	DF	ALG	Faouzi Ghoulam
14	FW	BRA	Brandão
15	FW	DEN	Andreas Laudrup (on loan from FC Nordsjælland)
16	GK	FRA	Stéphane Ruffier
17	FW	FRA	Kévin Mayi
18	MF	FRA	Fabien Lemoine

No.	Pos.	Nation	Player
19	MF	FRA	Josuha Guilavogui
20	DF	FRA	Jonathan Brison
21	MF	FRA	Romain Hamouma
22	FW	SRB	Danijel Aleksić
24	DF	FRA	Loïc Perrin (captain)
25	MF	ROU	Bănel Nicoliță
26	DF	SEN	Moustapha Bayal
27	MF	FRA	Mathieu Bodmer
28	MF	CIV	Ismaël Diomande
29	DF	FRA	François Clerc
30	GK	FRA	Jessy Moulin
40	GK	SEN	Pape Coulibaly

=== Out on loan ===
Note: Flags indicate national team as defined under FIFA eligibility rules; some limited exceptions apply. Players may hold more than one non-FIFA nationality.

No.	Pos.	Nation	Player
—	DF	SEN	Guirane N'Daw (at Ipswich Town)
—	DF	GUI	Florentin Pogba (at Sedan)
—	MF	FRA	Yoric Ravet (at Angers)

No.	Pos.	Nation	Player
—	FW	FRA	Lynel Kitambala (at Dynamo Dresden)
—	FW	FRA	Idriss Saadi (at Gazélec Ajaccio)

=== Reserves ===
As of 2 August 2012

Note: Flags indicate national team as defined under FIFA eligibility rules; some limited exceptions apply. Players may hold more than one non-FIFA nationality.

No.	Pos.	Nation	Player
—	GK	FRA	Louis Beccu
—	GK	BFA	Germain Sanou
—	GK	FRA	Jérémy Vachoux
—	DF	FRA	Ruben Aguilar
—	DF	FRA	Thibault Balp
—	DF	FRA	Maxence Chapuis
—	DF	FRA	Aymeric Djeridi
—	DF	CMR	Guy Ritchy Pellet
—	DF	FRA	Pierre-Yves Polomat
—	DF	FRA	Romain Russier
—	MF	FRA	Zaven Bulut

No.	Pos.	Nation	Player
—	MF	NOR	Eirik Birkelund
—	MF	FRA	Kamel Chergui
—	MF	FRA	Sofian Elmoudane
—	MF	FRA	Yohan Garric
—	MF	SEN	Sidy Sagna
—	MF	FRA	Billal Sebaihi
—	FW	GAM	Ebrima Bojang
—	FW	GUI	Ibrahima Diaouara
—	FW	FRA	Jessim Mahaya
—	FW	FRA	Elian Tack

== Competitions ==
=== Overview ===
Competition	First match	Last match	Starting round	Final position	Record							
Competition	First match	Last match	Starting round	Final position	Pld	W	D	L	GF	GA	GD	Win %
Ligue 1	10 August 2012	26 May 2013	Matchday 1	5th	38	16	15	7	60	32	+28	42.11
Coupe de France	5 January 2013	16 April 2013	Round of 64	Quarter-finals	4	2	1	1	7	6	+1	50.00
Coupe de la Ligue	26 September 2012	20 April 2013	Third round	Winners	5	2	3	0	5	1	+4	40.00
Total					47	20	19	8	72	39	+33	42.55

Source: Soccerway

=== Ligue 1 ===
==== League table ====
Pos	Team	Pld	W	D	L	GF	GA	GD	Pts	Qualification or relegation
3	Lyon	38	19	10	9	61	38	+23	67	Qualification for the Champions League third qualifying round
4	Nice	38	18	10	10	57	46	+11	64	Qualification for the Europa League play-off round
5	Saint-Étienne	38	16	15	7	60	32	+28	63	Qualification for the Europa League third qualifying round (Note: Saint-Étienne, as winner of the 2012–13 Coupe de la Ligue, qualifies for the third qualifying round of 2013–14 UEFA Europa League.)
6	Lille	38	16	14	8	59	40	+19	62	
7	Bordeaux	38	13	16	9	40	34	+6	55	Qualification for the Europa League group stage (Note: Bordeaux, winner of the 2012–13 Coupe de France, qualified for the Group stage of 2013–14 UEFA Europa League.)

Source: Ligue 1
Rules for classification: 1) points; 2) goal difference; 3) number of goals scored.

==== Results summary ====
Overall								Home						Away					
Pld	W	D	L	GF	GA	GD	Pts	W	D	L	GF	GA	GD	W	D	L	GF	GA	GD
38	16	15	7	60	32	+28	63	11	4	4	36	13	+23	5	11	3	24	19	+5

Source: Ligue 1

==== Results by round ====
Round	1	2	3	4	5	6	7	8	9	10	11	12	13	14	15	16	17	18	19	20	21	22	23	24	25	26	27	28	29	30	31	32	33	34	35	36	37	38
Ground	H	A	H	A	H	A	H	H	A	H	A	H	A	H	A	H	A	H	A	H	A	H	A	H	A	A	H	A	H	A	H	A	H	A	H	A	H	A
Result	L	L	W	W	L	D	D	W	D	W	W	W	D	W	D	L	D	L	L	D	W	W	W	W	D	W	W	D	D	D	W	D	W	D	D	L	W	D
Position	15	16	11	8	10	11	11	9	10	5	6	4	5	4	3	4	4	8	10	11	8	7	6	4	5	5	4	4	4	4	3	4	4	4	5	6	4	5

Source: Ligue 1
A = Away; H = Home; W = Win; D = Draw; L = Loss

==== Matches ====
10 August 2012 1	Saint-Étienne	1–2	Lille	Saint-Étienne
--:-- CEST (UTC+2)

18 August 2012 2	Toulouse	2–1	Saint-Étienne	Toulouse
--:-- CEST (UTC+2)

26 August 2012 3	Saint-Étienne	4–0	Brest	Saint-Étienne
--:-- CEST (UTC+2)

1 September 2012 4	Bastia	0–3	Saint-Étienne	Bastia
--:-- CEST (UTC+2)

15 September 2012 5	Saint-Étienne	0–1	Sochaux	Saint-Étienne
--:-- CEST (UTC+2)

21 September 2012 6	Montpellier	1–1	Saint-Étienne	Montpellier
--:-- CEST (UTC+2)

30 September 2012 7	Saint-Étienne	0–0	Reims	Saint-Étienne
--:-- CEST (UTC+2)

5 October 2012 8	Saint-Étienne	4–0	Nancy	Saint-Étienne
--:-- CEST (UTC+2)

20 October 2012 9	Nice	1–1	Saint-Étienne	Nice
--:-- CEST (UTC+2)

26 October 2012 10	Saint-Étienne	2–0	Rennes	Saint-Étienne
--:-- CEST (UTC+2)

3 November 2012 11	Paris Saint-Germain	1–2	Saint-Étienne	Paris
--:-- CET (UTC+1)

10 November 2012 12	Saint-Étienne	2–0	Troyes	Saint-Étienne
--:-- CET (UTC+1)

17 November 2012 13	Evian	2–2	Saint-Étienne	Evian
--:-- CET (UTC+1)

23 November 2012 14	Saint-Étienne	1–0	Valenciennes	Saint-Étienne
--:-- CET (UTC+1)

30 November 2012 15	Ajaccio	0–0	Saint-Étienne	Ajaccio
--:-- CET (UTC+1)

9 December 2012 16	Saint-Étienne	0–1	Lyon	Saint-Étienne
--:-- CET (UTC+1)

13 December 2012 17	Bordeaux	0–0	Saint-Étienne	Bordeaux
--:-- CET (UTC+1)

16 December 2012 18	Saint-Étienne	0–2	Lorient	Saint-Étienne
--:-- CET (UTC+1)

23 December 2012 19	Marseille	1–0	Saint-Étienne	Marseille
--:-- CET (UTC+1)

11 January 2013 20	Saint-Étienne	2–2	Toulouse	Saint-Étienne
--:-- CET (UTC+1)

19 January 2013 21	Brest	0–1	Saint-Étienne	Brest
--:-- CET (UTC+1)

27 January 2013 22	Saint-Étienne	3–0	Bastia	Saint-Étienne
--:-- CET (UTC+1)

2 February 2013 23	Sochaux	1–2	Saint-Étienne	Montbéliard
--:-- CET (UTC+1)

9 February 2013 24	Saint-Étienne	4–1	Montpellier	Saint-Étienne
--:-- CET (UTC+1)

17 February 2013 25	Reims	1–1	Saint-Étienne	Reims
--:-- CET (UTC+1)

23 February 2013 26	Nancy	0–3	Saint-Étienne	Nancy
--:-- CET (UTC+1)

2 March 2013 27	Saint-Étienne	4–0	Nice	Saint-Étienne
--:-- CET (UTC+1)

8 March 2013 28	Rennes	2–2	Saint-Étienne	Rennes
--:-- CET (UTC+1)

17 March 2013 29	Saint-Étienne	2–2	Paris Saint-Germain	Saint-Étienne
--:-- CET (UTC+1)

30 March 2013 30	Troyes	2–2	Saint-Étienne	Troyes
--:-- CEST (UTC+2)

7 April 2013 31	Saint-Étienne	1–0	Evian	Saint-Étienne
--:-- CEST (UTC+2)

12 April 2013 32	Valenciennes	0–0	Saint-Étienne	Valenciennes
--:-- CEST (UTC+2)

24 April 2013 33	Saint-Étienne	4–2	Ajaccio	Saint-Étienne
--:-- CEST (UTC+2)

28 April 2013 34	Lyon	1–1	Saint-Étienne	Lyon
--:-- CEST (UTC+2)

3 May 2013 35	Saint-Étienne	0–0	Bordeaux	Saint-Étienne
--:-- CEST (UTC+2)

12 May 2013 36	Lorient	3–1	Saint-Étienne	Lorient
--:-- CEST (UTC+2)

18 May 2013 37	Saint-Étienne	2–0	Marseille	Saint-Étienne
--:-- CEST (UTC+2)

26 May 2013 38	Lille	1–1	Saint-Étienne	Lille
--:-- CEST (UTC+2)

=== Coupe de France ===
16 April 2013 Quarter-finals	Saint-Étienne	1–2	Lorient	Saint-Étienne
20:50	Aubameyang 74'	Report	Barthelme 43'; Aliadière 90+2'	Stadium: Stade Geoffroy-Guichard; Attendance: 19,256; Referee: Saïd Ennjimi

=== Coupe de la Ligue ===
26 September 2012 Third round	Lorient	1–1 (0–3 p)	Saint-Étienne	Lorient
20:55 CEST (UTC+2)

30 October 2012 Round of 16	Sochaux	0–3	Saint-Étienne	Montbéliard
18:00 CEST (UTC+2)

27 November 2012 Quarter-finals	Saint-Étienne	0–0 (a.e.t.) (5–3 p)	Paris Saint-Germain	Saint-Étienne
20:55 CEST (UTC+2)

15 January 2013 Semi-finals	Saint-Étienne	0–0 (a.e.t.) (7–6 p)	Lille	Saint-Étienne
20:55 CEST (UTC+2)

20 April 2013 Final	Saint-Étienne	1–0	Rennes	Saint-Denis
21:00 CEST (UTC+2)				Stadium: Stade de France; Attendance: 79,000; Referee: Ruddy Buquet
