= Léo Lacroix (footballer) =

Swiss footballer (born 1992)

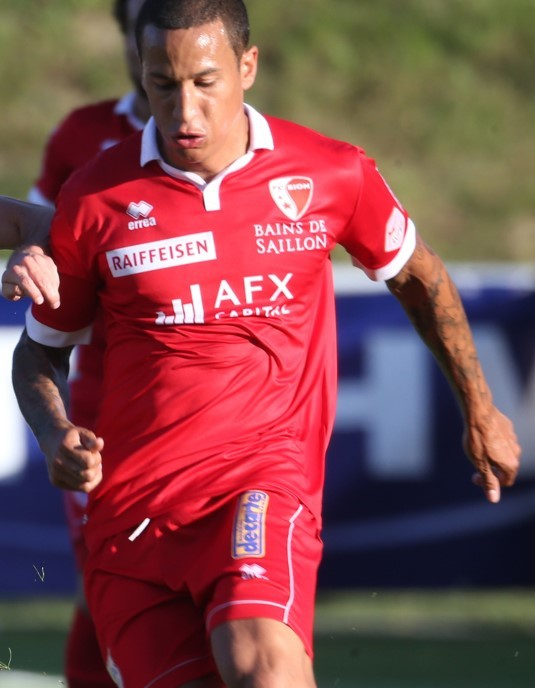
- Lacroix with Sion in July 2016

Personal information
- Full name: Léo Lacroix
- Date of birth: 27 February 1992 (age 34)
- Place of birth: Lausanne, Switzerland
- Height: 1.97 m (6 ft 6 in)
- Position: Defender

Team information
- Current team: Al-Jabalain
- Number: 4

Youth career
- 2002–2004: Lausanne-Sport
- 2004–2005: US Affrico
- 2005–2007: Sporting Arno
- 2007: Team Vaud
- 2008: Malley
- 2009: São Cristóvão
- 2009–2011: Sion

Senior career*
Years	Team	Apps	(Gls)
2011–2012	Sion U21		
2012–2016	Sion	77	(1)
2016–2020	Saint-Étienne	31	(0)
2017–2020	Saint-Étienne B	4	(1)
2018	→ Basel (loan)	9	(0)
2018–2019	→ Hamburger SV (loan)	16	(1)
2018	→ Hamburger SV II (loan)	1	(0)
2021	Sion	13	(0)
2021–2023	Western United	50	(3)
2023–2024	FC U Craiova	33	(3)
2024–	Al-Jabalain	0	(0)

International career
2010	Switzerland U18	2	(0)
2010	Switzerland U19	8	(0)
2013–2014	Switzerland U21	4	(0)
2018	Switzerland	1	(0)
- * Club domestic league appearances and goals as of 13 May 2024

Léo Lacroix (born 27 February 1992) is a Swiss professional footballer who plays as a defender for Saudi Arabian club Al-Jabalain.

== Club career ==
On 31 August 2016, Ligue 1 side Saint-Étienne announced that they had reached an agreement for the transfer of Lacroix. Lacroix signed a four-year contract and in his first season he had 20 appearances in the 2016–17 Ligue 1. In the 2017–18 Ligue 1 season he played 11 games for the team, but was then loaned out to Swiss club Basel.

Lacroix joined Basel's first team in the winter break of their 2017–18 season under head coach Raphaël Wicky. The loan was dated until summer 2018, with the option of a definite transfer. Basel had to find a replacement for Manuel Akanji, who had transferred out to Borussia Dortmund. Lacroix played his domestic league debut for the club in the away game in the Stockhorn Arena on 10 February as Basel won 2–0 against Thun. Lacroix stayed with Basel until the end of the season, but the club did not pull the option. During his short period with the club Lacroix played a total of 12 games for Basel without scoring a goal. Nine of these games were in the Swiss Super League, one in the Swiss Cup and two games against Manchester City in the 2017–18 UEFA Champions League knockout phase.

In September 2021, Lacroix signed with Australian club Western United. Lacroix spent two seasons at Western United, before departing at the end of the 2022-23 season.

On 17 July 2023, he moved to Romanian Liga I club FC U Craiova on a one-year deal, with an extension option. On 13 May 2024, his contract was terminated by mutual consent, a day after a 1–3 loss to Hermannstadt, resulting in FC U Craiova's last-place finish and relegation to the second division.

On 22 August 2024, Lacroix joined Saudi Arabian club Al-Jabalain.

== International career ==
Lacroix was born in Switzerland, and is of Brazilian descent through his mother. He got his first call up to the senior Switzerland side for the 2018 FIFA World Cup qualifiers against Hungary and Andorra in October 2016. He made his debut for the national team on 14 November 2018 in a friendly against Qatar.

== Career statistics ==
=== Club ===
As of 12 May 2024

Appearances and goals by club, season and competition
Club	Season	League			National Cup		League Cup		Other		Total	
Club	Season	Division	Apps	Goals	Apps	Goals	Apps	Goals	Apps	Goals	Apps	Goals
Sion	2012–13	Swiss Super League	9	1	1	0	—		0	0	10	1
Sion	2013–14	Swiss Super League	15	0	2	0	—		—		17	0
Sion	2014–15	Swiss Super League	28	0	4	1	—		—		32	1
Sion	2015–16	Swiss Super League	20	0	2	0	—		7 (Note: Appearances in the Europa League)	1	29	1
Sion	2016–17	Swiss Super League	5	0	0	0	—		—		5	0
Sion	Total		77	1	9	1	—		7	1	93	3
Saint-Étienne	2016–17	Ligue 1	20	0	1	0	1	0	3	0	25	0
Saint-Étienne	2017–18	Ligue 1	11	0	1	0	1	0	—		13	0
Saint-Étienne	Total		31	0	2	0	2	0	3	0	38	0
Saint-Étienne B	2016–17	Championnat de France Amateur 2	1	0	—		—		—		1	0
Saint-Étienne B	2019–20	Championnat National 2	3	1	—		—		—		3	1
Saint-Étienne B	Total		4	1	—		—		—		4	1
Basel (loan)	2017–18	Swiss Super League	9	0	1	0	—		2 (Note: Appearances in the UEFA Champions League)	0	12	0
Hamburg (loan)	2018–19	2. Bundesliga	16	1	1	0	—		—		17	1
Hamburg II (loan)	2018–19	Regionalliga Nord	1	0	—		—		—		1	0
Sion	2020–21	Swiss Super League	11	0	1	0	—		—		12	0
Sion	2021–22	Swiss Super League	2	0	0	0	—		—		2	0
Sion	Total		13	0	1	0	0	0	0	0	14	0
Western United	2021–22	A-League Men	27	3	1	0	—		—		28	3
Western United	2022–23	A-League Men	23	0	1	0	—		—		24	0
Western United	Total		50	3	2	0	—		—		52	3
FC U Craiova	2023–24	Liga I	33	3	4	0	—		—		37	3
Career total			234	9	20	1	2	0	12	1	268	11

== Honours ==
Sion

- Swiss Cup: 2014–15

Western United

- A-League Men: 2021–22

Individual

- A-Leagues All Star: 2022
- PFA A-League Team of the Season: 2021–22
