= Jessy Moulin =

French footballer (born 1986)

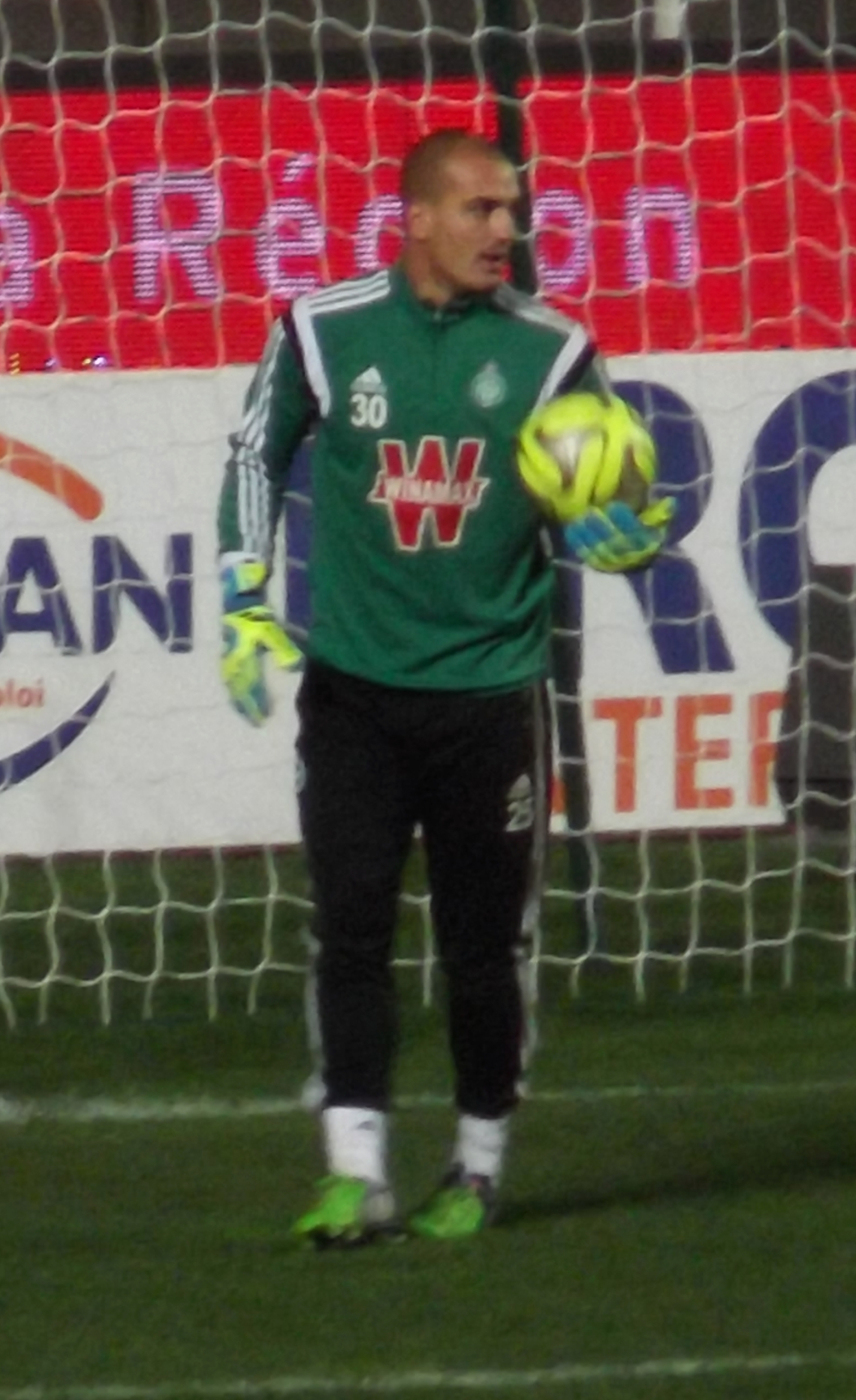
- Moulin with Saint-Étienne in 2014

Personal information
- Date of birth: 13 January 1986 (age 40)
- Place of birth: Valence, France
- Height: 1.84 m (6 ft 0 in)
- Position: Goalkeeper

Youth career
- –2005: Saint-Étienne

Senior career*
Years	Team	Apps	(Gls)
2005–2016	Saint-Étienne B	16	(0)
2007–2021	Saint-Étienne	48	(0)
2008–2009	→ Arles (loan)	26	(0)
2009–2010	→ Fréjus Saint-Raphaël (loan)	15	(0)
2011–2012	→ Clermont (loan)	2	(0)
2021–2023	Troyes	7	(0)
Total		114	(0)
- * Club domestic league appearances and goals

Jessy Moulin (born 13 January 1986) is a French former professional footballer who played as a goalkeeper. he played his most of the career with Saint-Étienne.

Moulin played for Saint-Étienne until 2021. He joined the club's reserve team in 2005, joining the first team in 2007 and being sent on loan spells to Arles, Fréjus Saint-Raphaël, and Clermont in the process. He joined Troyes in 2021 and retired on 14 August 2023.

== Career statistics ==
Appearances and goals by club, season and competition
Club	Season	League			Coupe de France		Coupe de la Ligue		Europe		Total	
Club	Season	Division	Apps	Goals	Apps	Goals	Apps	Goals	Apps	Goals	Apps	Goals
Saint-Étienne	2005–06	Ligue 1	0	0	0	0	0	0	0	0	0	0
Saint-Étienne	2006–07	Ligue 1	0	0	0	0	0	0	—		0	0
Saint-Étienne	2007–08	Ligue 1	0	0	0	0	0	0	—		0	0
Saint-Étienne	2010–11	Ligue 1	3	0	0	0	0	0	—		3	0
Saint-Étienne	2012–13	Ligue 1	0	0	1	0	0	0	—		1	0
Saint-Étienne	2013–14	Ligue 1	0	0	1	0	0	0	0	0	1	0
Saint-Étienne	2014–15	Ligue 1	0	0	0	0	0	0	0	0	0	0
Saint-Étienne	2015–16	Ligue 1	0	0	0	0	1	0	1	0	2	0
Saint-Étienne	2016–17	Ligue 1	6	0	1	0	0	0	4	0	11	0
Saint-Étienne	2017–18	Ligue 1	4	0	2	0	0	0	—		6	0
Saint-Étienne	2018–19	Ligue 1	1	0	0	0	0	0	—		1	0
Saint-Étienne	2019–20	Ligue 1	5	0	2	0	2	0	2	0	11	0
Saint-Étienne	2020–21	Ligue 1	29	0	0	0	—		—		29	0
Saint-Étienne	Total		48	0	7	0	3	0	7	0	65	0
Arles (loan)	2008–09	National	26	0	1	0	—		—		27	0
Fréjus Saint-Raphaël (loan)	2009–10	National	15	0	1	0	—		—		16	0
Clermont (loan)	2011–12	Ligue 2	2	0	3	0	0	0	—		5	0
Troyes	2021–22	Ligue 1	7	0	1	0	—		—		8	0
Troyes	2022–23	Ligue 1	0	0	0	0	—		—		0	0
Troyes	Total		7	0	1	0	—		—		8	0
Career total			98	0	13	0	3	0	7	0	121	0

== Honours ==
Saint-Étienne

- Coupe de la Ligue: 2012–13
- Coupe de France runner-up: 2019–20
