= Loïc Perrin =

French footballer (born 1985)

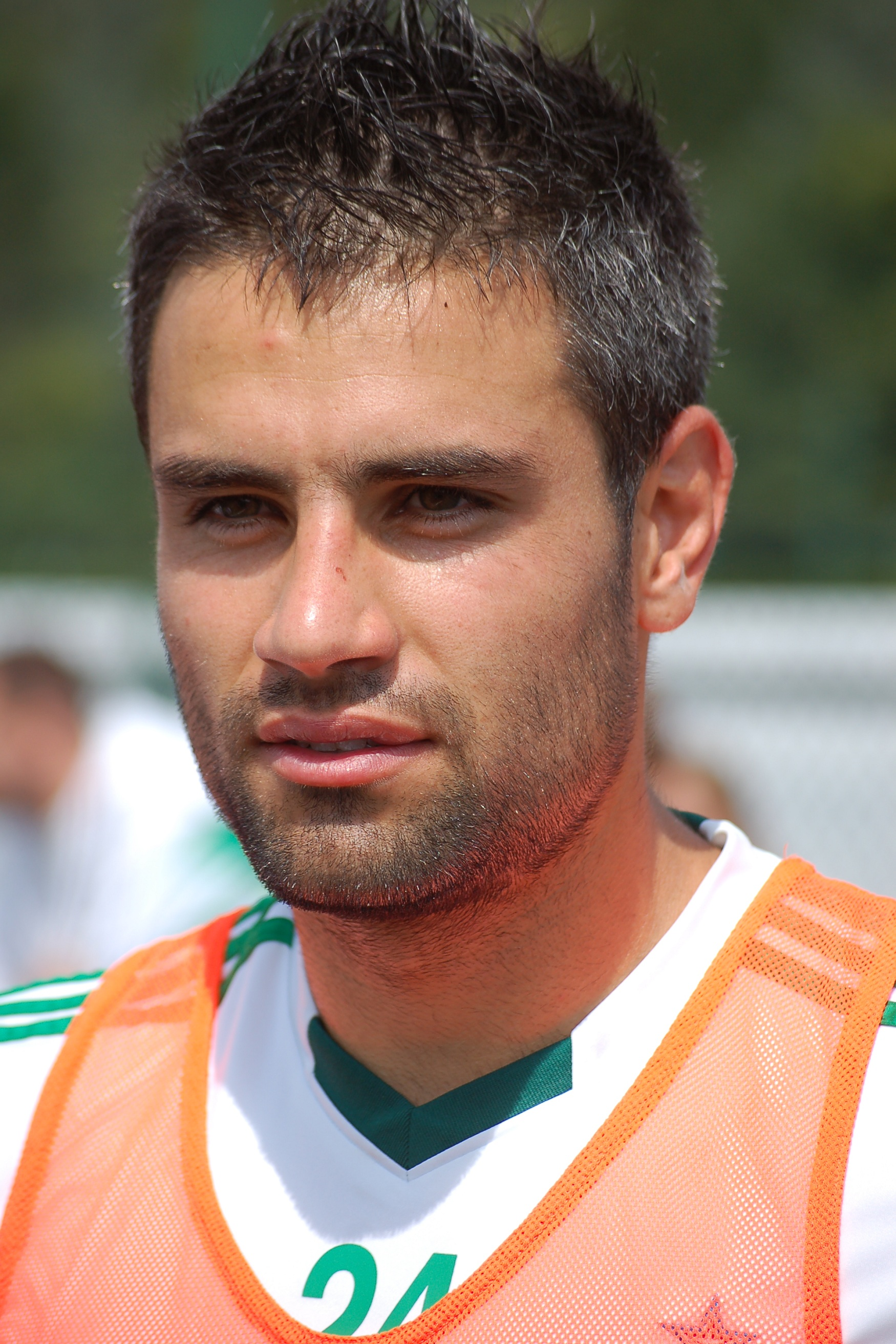
- Perrin with Saint-Étienne in 2011

Personal information
- Full name: Loïc Bruno Perrin
- Date of birth: 7 August 1985 (age 41)
- Place of birth: Saint-Étienne, France
- Height: 1.81 m (5 ft 11 in)
- Position: Centre-back

Youth career
- 1990–1993: FC Périgneux
- 1993–1997: FC St. Charles la Vigilante
- 1997–2003: Saint-Étienne

Senior career*
Years	Team	Apps	(Gls)
2003–2020	Saint-Étienne	391	(27)
2012	Saint-Étienne B	2	(3)
Total		393	(30)

International career
2003–2004	France U18	2	(1)
2004–2005	France U21	4	(0)
- * Club domestic league appearances and goals

Loïc Bruno Perrin (French pronunciation: [lɔik bʁyno pɛʁɛ̃]; born 7 August 1985) is a French former professional footballer who played as a centre-back. He spent all of his professional career with his hometown club Saint-Étienne.

== Club career ==
Perrin made his debut for Saint-Etienne in 2003 whilst the club was playing in Ligue 2. On 20 April 2013, Perrin played for Saint-Etienne in their Coupe de la Ligue final victory over Rennes.

In 2017, Perrin signed a three-year deal to keep him at Saint-Étienne through 2020.

On 24 July 2020, in the last game of his career, Perrin was sent off in the first half of the Coupe de France Final for a foul on Kylian Mbappé, who suffered an ankle injury; Paris Saint-Germain won the match 1–0.

== International career ==
On 6 November 2014, Perrin was called up to France manager Didier Deschamps' 23-man squad for friendly matches against Albania and Sweden. He was called up again on 9 November 2015 as a replacement for the injured Mamadou Sakho to face Germany and England in friendlies.

== Career statistics ==
Appearances and goals by club, season and competition
Club	Season	League			Coupe de France		Coupe de la Ligue		Europe		Total	
Club	Season	Division	Apps	Goals	Apps	Goals	Apps	Goals	Apps	Goals	Apps	Goals
Saint-Étienne	2003–04	Ligue 2	7	0	0	0	1	0	—		8	0
Saint-Étienne	2004–05	Ligue 1	16	0	1	0	2	0	—		19	0
Saint-Étienne	2005–06	Ligue 1	26	2	1	0	1	0	2 (Note: Appearances in UEFA Cup)	0	30	2
Saint-Étienne	2006–07	Ligue 1	10	0	0	0	0	0	—		10	0
Saint-Étienne	2007–08	Ligue 1	35	2	1	0	1	0	—		37	2
Saint-Étienne	2008–09	Ligue 1	14	0	1	0	0	0	4	1	19	1
Saint-Étienne	2009–10	Ligue 1	18	2	2	0	2	0	—		22	2
Saint-Étienne	2010–11	Ligue 1	27	4	1	0	0	0	—		28	4
Saint-Étienne	2011–12	Ligue 1	11	0	0	0	1	0	—		12	0
Saint-Étienne	2012–13	Ligue 1	34	2	2	0	5	0	—		41	2
Saint-Étienne	2013–14	Ligue 1	34	6	0	0	1	0	3 (Note: Appearances in UEFA Europa League)	1	38	7
Saint-Étienne	2014–15	Ligue 1	28	1	5	0	2	0	7	0	42	1
Saint-Étienne	2015–16	Ligue 1	24	3	2	0	0	0	8	0	34	3
Saint-Étienne	2016–17	Ligue 1	27	4	2	0	1	0	10	0	40	4
Saint-Étienne	2017–18	Ligue 1	28	0	0	0	0	0	—		28	0
Saint-Étienne	2018–19	Ligue 1	31	1	1	1	0	0	—		32	2
Saint-Étienne	2019–20	Ligue 1	21	0	3	0	2	0	4	0	30	0
Saint-Étienne	Total		391	27	21	1	19	0	38	2	470	30
Saint-Étienne B	2011–12	CFA	2	3	—		—		—		2	3
Career total			393	30	21	1	19	0	38	2	472	33

== Honours ==
Saint-Étienne

- Coupe de la Ligue: 2012–13
- Ligue 2: 2003–04
- Coupe de France runner-up: 2019–20

France U21

- Toulon Tournament: 2005

Individual

- Ligue 1 Team of the Year: 2013–14

== See also ==
- List of one-club men in association football
