= Rayan Souici =

French footballer (born 1998)

Personal information
- Date of birth: 28 February 1998 (age 28)
- Place of birth: Pierre-Bénite, France
- Height: 1.85 m (6 ft 1 in)
- Position: Midfielder

Team information
- Current team: Bourg-Péronnas
- Number: 6

Youth career
- 2004–2006: FC Vaulx-en-Velin
- 2006–2010: Lyon
- 2010–2013: Saint-Priest
- 2013–2017: Saint-Étienne

Senior career*
Years	Team	Apps	(Gls)
2015–2021	Saint-Étienne II	45	(1)
2017–2021	Saint-Étienne	2	(0)
2017–2018	→ Entente SSG (loan)	9	(0)
2018–2019	→ Entente SSG (loan)	25	(2)
2019–2020	→ Servette (loan)	6	(0)
2022–2023	Saint-Priest	22	(6)
2023–2025	Dijon	46	(4)
2025–2026	Al-Fujairah	0	(0)
2026–	Bourg-Péronnas	0	(0)

International career
2013–2014	France U16	6	(1)
2016	France U18	6	(1)
2016	France U19	9	(1)
- * Club domestic league appearances and goals as of 26 May 2025

Rayan Souici (born 28 February 1998) is a French professional footballer who plays as a midfielder for Ligue 3 club Bourg-Péronnas.

== Club career ==
Souici developed through the Saint-Étienne academy. He made his Ligue 1 debut on 5 August 2017, in a 1–0 home win against Nice. He came on after 79 minutes for Oussama Tannane.

== International career ==
Born in France and of Algerian descent, Souici is a former youth international for France.

== Career statistics ==
As of match played 16 April 2022

Appearances by club, season and competition
Club	Season	League			National Cup		Other		Total	
Club	Season	Division	Apps	Goals	Apps	Goals	Apps	Goals	Apps	Goals
Saint-Étienne II	2014–15	CFA	1	0	—		—		1	0
Saint-Étienne II	2015–16	CFA 2	18	0	—		—		18	0
Saint-Étienne II	2016–17	CFA 2	12	0	—		—		12	0
Saint-Étienne II	2017–18	National 3	12	1	—		—		12	1
Saint-Étienne II	2020–21	National 3	2	0	—		—		2	0
Saint-Étienne II	Total		45	1	—		—		45	1
Saint-Étienne	2017–18	Ligue 1	1	0	0	0	0	0	1	0
Saint-Étienne	2020–21	Ligue 1	1	0	0	0	0	0	1	0
Saint-Étienne	Total		2	0	0	0	0	0	2	0
Entente SSG (loan)	2017–18	National	9	0	0	0	—		9	0
Entente SSG (loan)	2018–19	National	25	2	0	0	—		25	2
Servette (loan)	2019–20	Swiss Super League	6	0	0	0	—		6	0
Saint-Priest	2021–22	National 2	8	3	0	0	—		8	3
Career total			106	6	0	0	0	0	106	6
