= 2005–06 AS Saint-Étienne season =

AS Saint-Étienne
2005–06 season
- President: Bernard Caïazzo
- Head coach: Élie Baup
- Stadium: Stade Geoffroy-Guichard
- Ligue 1: 13th
- Coupe de France: Round of 64
- Coupe de la Ligue: Third round
- Top goalscorer: League: Frédéric Piquionne (6); All: Frédéric Piquionne (7)
- Highest home attendance: 35,123 vs Marseille
- Average home league attendance: 29,627
- Biggest win: Saint-Étienne 3–0 Paris Saint-Germain; Saint-Étienne 3–0 Le Mans
- Biggest defeat: Sochaux 4–0 Saint-Étienne; Lyon 4–0 Saint-Étienne

The 2005–06 season was the 73rd in the history of AS Saint-Étienne and their second consecutive season in the second division. The club participated in Ligue 1 and the Coupe de France.

== Pre-season and friendlies ==
Win Draw Loss

14 July 2005 Friendly	Saint-Étienne	4–1	Andrézieux-Bouthéon FC	France
CEST (UTC+2)

21 July 2005 Friendly	Saint-Étienne	2–0	UNFP	France
CEST (UTC+2)

2 September 2005 Friendly	Saint-Étienne	2–1	Barcelona	Saint-Étienne
20:30 CEST (UTC+2)				Stadium: Stade Geoffroy-Guichard; Attendance: 26,316

21 April 2006 Friendly	Saint-Étienne	1–0	Toulouse	France
CEST (UTC+2)				Attendance: 2,000

== Competitions ==
=== Overall record ===
Competition	First match	Last match	Starting round	Final position	Record							
Competition	First match	Last match	Starting round	Final position	Pld	W	D	L	GF	GA	GD	Win %
Ligue 1	30 July 2005	13 May 2006	Matchday 1	13th	38	11	14	13	29	39	−10	28.95
Coupe de France	7 January 2006		Round of 64	Round of 64	1	0	0	1	0	1	−1	0.00
Coupe de la Ligue	26 October 2005		Second round	Second round	1	0	0	1	0	2	−2	0.00
Total					40	11	14	15	29	42	−13	27.50

Source: Competitions

=== Ligue 1 ===
==== League table ====
Pos	Team	Pld	W	D	L	GF	GA	GD	Pts	Qualification or relegation
11	Le Mans	38	13	13	12	33	36	−3	52	
12	Nancy	38	12	12	14	35	37	−2	48	Qualification to UEFA Cup first round (Note: Nancy was qualified for the 2006–07 UEFA Cup as winners of the 2005–06 Coupe de la Ligue.)
13	Saint-Étienne	38	11	14	13	29	39	−10	47	
14	Nantes	38	11	12	15	37	41	−4	45	
15	Sochaux	38	11	11	16	34	47	−13	44	

Source: Ligue 1
Rules for classification: 1) points; 2) goal difference; 3) number of goals scored.

==== Results summary ====
Overall								Home						Away					
Pld	W	D	L	GF	GA	GD	Pts	W	D	L	GF	GA	GD	W	D	L	GF	GA	GD
38	11	14	13	29	39	−10	47	6	8	5	18	15	+3	5	6	8	11	24	−13

Source: Ligue 1

==== Results by round ====
Round	1	2	3	4	5	6	7	8	9	10	11	12	13	14	15	16	17	18	19	20	21	22	23	24	25	26	27	28	29	30	31	32	33	34	35	36	37	38
Ground	H	A	H	A	H	A	H	H	A	H	A	H	A	H	A	H	A	H	A	H	A	H	A	H	A	A	H	A	H	A	H	A	H	A	H	A	H	A
Result	D	D	W	D	D	W	W	L	L	W	D	W	W	D	L	D	L	D	W	D	W	L	L	L	D	L	L	W	W	L	L	D	D	D	W	L	D	L
Position	10	13	9	8	9	7	3	5	8	4	5	4	3	3	5	7	9	9	9	9	7	8	10	10	10	11	15	13	11	13	13	13	13	13	12	13	13	13

Source: Ligue 1
A = Away; H = Home; W = Win; D = Draw; L = Loss

==== Matches ====
30 July 2005 1	Saint-Étienne	0–0	Ajaccio	Saint-Étienne
20:00 CEST (UTC+2)				Stadium: Stade Geoffroy-Guichard

6 August 2005 2	Troyes	0–0	Saint-Étienne	Troyes
20:00 CEST (UTC+2)				Stadium: Stade de l'Aube

13 August 2005 3	Saint-Étienne	2–0	Metz	Saint-Étienne
20:00 CEST (UTC+2)				Stadium: Stade Geoffroy-Guichard

21 August 2005 4	Toulouse	1–1	Saint-Étienne	Toulouse
18:00 CEST (UTC+2)				Stadium: Stadium de Toulouse

27 August 2005 5	Saint-Étienne	0–0	Sochaux	Saint-Étienne
20:00 CEST (UTC+2)				Stadium: Stade Geoffroy-Guichard

10 September 2005 6	Nice	0–1	Saint-Étienne	Nice
20:00 CEST (UTC+2)				Stadium: Stade du Ray

18 September 2005 7	Saint-Étienne	3–0	Paris Saint-Germain	Saint-Étienne
21:00 CEST (UTC+2)				Stadium: Stade Geoffroy-Guichard; Attendance: 27,771

21 September 2005 8	Saint-Étienne	0–2	Nancy	Saint-Étienne
20:30 CEST (UTC+2)				Stadium: Stade Geoffroy-Guichard; Attendance: 26,711

24 September 2005 9	Lille	2–0	Saint-Étienne	Villeneuve d'Ascq
20:00 CEST (UTC+2)				Stadium: Stadium Lille Métropole

1 October 2005 10	Saint-Étienne	3–0	Le Mans	Saint-Étienne
20:00 CEST (UTC+2)				Stadium: Stade Geoffroy-Guichard; Attendance: 27,614

15 October 2005 11	Nantes	1–1	Saint-Étienne	Nantes
17:15 CEST (UTC+2)				Stadium: Stade de la Beaujoire

23 October 2005 12	Saint-Étienne	2–1	Marseille	Saint-Étienne
20:45 CEST (UTC+2)				Stadium: Stade Geoffroy-Guichard; Attendance: 35,123

29 October 2005 13	Strasbourg	0–1	Saint-Étienne	Strasbourg
20:00 CEST (UTC+2)				Stadium: Stade de la Meinau

5 November 2005 14	Saint-Étienne	1–1	Auxerre	Saint-Étienne
20:00 CEST (UTC+2)				Stadium: Stade Geoffroy-Guichard; Attendance: 33,005

19 November 2005 15	Monaco	1–0	Saint-Étienne	Monaco
17:15 CEST (UTC+2)	Meriem 54'			Stadium: Stade Louis II; Attendance: 16,234; Referee: Philippe Kalt

26 November 2005 16	Saint-Étienne	1–1	Bordeaux	Saint-Étienne
20:00 CEST (UTC+2)				Stadium: Stade Geoffroy-Guichard; Attendance: 34,089; Referee: Bertrand Layec

4 December 2005 17	Lens	2–1	Saint-Étienne	Lens
21:00 CEST (UTC+2)				Stadium: Stade Félix Bollaert; Attendance: 33,652; Referee: Hervé Piccirillo

11 December 2005 18	Saint-Étienne	0–0	Lyon	Saint-Étienne
21:00 CEST (UTC+2)				Stadium: Stade Geoffroy-Guichard; Attendance: 35,352; Referee: Stéphane Bré

17 December 2005 19	Rennes	0–1	Saint-Étienne	Rennes
20:00 CEST (UTC+2)				Stadium: Stade de la Route de Lorient; Attendance: 28,821; Referee: Claude Colombo

4 January 2006 20	Saint-Étienne	1–1	Troyes	Saint-Étienne
20:30 CEST (UTC+2)				Stadium: Stade Geoffroy-Guichard; Attendance: 25,641; Referee: Bruno Coué

11 January 2006 21	Metz	0–1	Saint-Étienne	Metz
20:30 CEST (UTC+2)			Postiga 16'	Stadium: Stade Saint-Symphorien; Attendance: 12,273; Referee: Bertrand Layec

21 January 2006 23	Sochaux	4–0	Saint-Étienne	Montbéliard
20:00 CEST (UTC+2)				Stadium: Stade Auguste Bonal; Attendance: 13,566; Referee: Pascal Garibian

1 February 2006 22	Saint-Étienne	1–3	Toulouse	Saint-Étienne
20:00 CEST (UTC+2)				Stadium: Stade Geoffroy-Guichard; Attendance: 24,296; Referee: Olivier Thual

4 February 2006 25	Paris Saint-Germain	2–2	Saint-Étienne	Paris
20:00 CEST (UTC+2)				Stadium: Parc des Princes; Attendance: 43,026; Referee: Stéphane Lannoy

11 February 2006 26	Nancy	2–0	Saint-Étienne	Tomblaine
20:00 CEST (UTC+2)				Stadium: Stade Marcel Picot; Attendance: 16,107; Referee: Philippe Malige

14 February 2006 24	Saint-Étienne	0–1	Nice	Saint-Étienne
20:00 CEST (UTC+2)				Stadium: Stade Geoffroy-Guichard; Attendance: 22,440; Referee: Stéphane Bré

18 February 2006 27	Saint-Étienne	0–2	Lille	Saint-Étienne
20:00 CEST (UTC+2)				Stadium: Stade Geoffroy-Guichard; Attendance: 24,655; Referee: Alain Sars

25 February 2006 28	Le Mans	0–1	Saint-Étienne	Le Mans
20:00 CEST (UTC+2)			Postiga 57'	Stadium: Stade Léon Bollée; Attendance: 13,704; Referee: Jean-Charles Cailleux

5 March 2006 29	Saint-Étienne	1–0	Nantes	Saint-Étienne
20:45 CEST (UTC+2)	Mazure 90+1'			Stadium: Stade Geoffroy-Guichard; Attendance: 24,359; Referee: Thierry Auriac

12 March 2006 30	Marseille	2–0	Saint-Étienne	Marseille
21:00 CEST (UTC+2)	Pagis 17', 19', (penalty missed) 64'			Stadium: Stade Vélodrome; Attendance: 53,103; Referee: Philippe Kalt

19 March 2006 31	Saint-Étienne	0–2	Strasbourg	Saint-Étienne
18:00 CEST (UTC+2)				Stadium: Stade Geoffroy-Guichard; Attendance: 25,566; Referee: Stéphane Lannoy

25 March 2006 32	Auxerre	0–0	Saint-Étienne	Auxerre
20:00 CEST (UTC+2)				Stadium: Stade de l'Abbé Deschamps; Attendance: 18,487; Referee: Bruno Coué

1 April 2006 33	Saint-Étienne	1–1	Monaco	Saint-Étienne
20:00 CEST (UTC+2)				Stadium: Stade Geoffroy-Guichard; Attendance: 33,683; Referee: Bruno Ruffray

8 April 2006 34	Bordeaux	0–0	Saint-Étienne	Bordeaux
20:00 CEST (UTC+2)				Stadium: Stade Chaban-Delmas; Attendance: 32,222; Referee: Laurent Duhamel

15 April 2006 35	Saint-Étienne	2–0	Lens	Saint-Étienne
20:00 CEST (UTC+2)				Stadium: Stade Geoffroy-Guichard; Attendance: 34,921; Referee: Patrick Lhermite

30 April 2006 36	Lyon	4–0	Saint-Étienne	Lyon
21:00 CEST (UTC+2)				Stadium: Stade de Gerland; Attendance: 39,081; Referee: Stéphane Lannoy

6 May 2006 37	Saint-Étienne	0–0	Rennes	Saint-Étienne
20:00 CEST (UTC+2)				Stadium: Stade Geoffroy-Guichard; Attendance: 32,478; Referee: Stéphane Moulin

13 May 2006 38	Ajaccio	3–1	Saint-Étienne	Ajaccio
20:00 CEST (UTC+2)				Stadium: Stade François Coty; Attendance: 3,381; Referee: Bruno Derrien

=== Coupe de France ===
7 January 2006 Round of 64	Saint-Étienne	0–1 (a.e.t.)	Lille	Saint-Étienne
17:00 CET (UTC+1)			Moussilou 120+3'	Stadium: Stade Geoffroy-Guichard; Attendance: 12,745; Referee: Philippe Kalt

=== Coupe de la Ligue ===
26 October 2005 Third round	Saint-Étienne	0–2	Lille	Saint-Étienne
CET (UTC+1)				Stadium: Stade Geoffroy Guichard
