= 2013–14 Coupe de France =

Coupe Charles Simon

Tournament details
- Country: France
- Teams: 7,656

Final positions
- Champions: Guingamp
- Runners-up: Rennes

Tournament statistics
- Top goal scorer(s): Mustapha Yatabaré (8 goals)

The 2013–14 Coupe de France was the 97th season of the most prestigious football cup competition of France. The competition was organized by the French Football Federation (FFF) and open to all clubs in French football, as well as clubs from the overseas departments and territories (Guadeloupe, French Guiana, Martinique, Mayotte, New Caledonia, French Polynesia, and Réunion). The winner, Guingamp, qualified for the group stage of the 2014–15 UEFA Europa League.

Holders Bordeaux were eliminated in the Round of 32 on penalties by fifth-tier Monticello.

== Seventh round ==
Home team	Score	Away team
16 November
Dijon FCO (2)	2–1	Nîmes Olympique (2)
Paron FC (8)	1–2 (a.e.t.)	Chassieu Decines FC (6)
AS Berck (10)	0–3	Stade Lavallois (2)
Amicale Pascal Calais (9)	2–4	AS du Pays Neslois (6)
US Concarneau (4)	4–1	Club Franciscain (Martinique)
SC Le Havre Frileuse (6)	1–6	USL Dunkerque (3)
Avant-Garde de Plouvorn (6)	1–1 (4–5 p)	CA Bastia (2)
FC Roche Saint-Genest (7)	0–1	FC Istres (2)
US Avranches (4)	3–1	US Matoury (French Guiana)
AJ Biguglia (6)	0–1	AS Cannes (4)
ASL Koetzingue (7)	1–4 (a.e.t.)	AJ Auxerre (2)
US Lalevade-Prades (9)	0–4	FC Bourg-Péronnas (3)
SC Selongey (6)	1–0	Clermont Foot (2)
Aubagne FC (5)	2–0	Le Puy Foot 43 Auvergne (5)
Magny (6)	2–1 (a.e.t.)	AS Erstein (7)
Onet-le-Château Football (6)	0–3	FC Sète 34 (5)
CA Pontarlier (5)	2–1	FC Saint-Louis Neuweg (5)
AS Vitré (4)	5–2 (a.e.t.)	SO Choletais (5)
Avenir Foot Lozère (6)	3–4 (a.e.t.)	AS Lyon-Duchère (4)
Espérance Chartres-de-Bretagne (7)	0–2	Lannion FC (5)
FC Drouais (6)	0–1	SM Caen (2)
FC Cournon-d'Auvergne (6)	2–2 (3–4 p)	AS Moulins (4)
Lunéville FC (6)	1–3 (a.e.t.)	US Raon-l'Étape (4)
UF Maconnais (7)	1–3 (a.e.t.)	Monts d'Or Azergues Foot (4)
Mouilleron FC (8)	1–5	Angers SCO (2)
Nivolet FC (8)	1–2	Niort FC (2)
SO Romorantin (4)	5–0	FC Chamalières (7)
CS Sedan (5)	1–3 (a.e.t.)	US Créteil (2)
Balma SC (5)	3–0	Blagnac FC (6)
CS Moulien (Guadeloupe)	0–1	FC Chambly (4)
Les Herbiers VF (4)	2–0	Tours FC (2)
Cambrai FC (6)	2–4	Arras FC (5)
US Montagnarde (6)	1–2	Quimperlé FC (7)
Olympique Alès (5)	3–0	AC Arles-Avignon (2)
Bressuire FC (6)	3–2	Stade Bordeaux (4)
FC Pacy-Menilles (6)	0–2	US Carquefou (3)
Stade Poitiers (5)	0–1 (a.e.t.)	US Saint-Malo (4)
Sablé FC (5)	0–2	Stade Brest (2)
Tourlaville Foot (7)	0–2	Vannes OC (3)
FC Villenave (4)	2–1 (a.e.t.)	Les Genêts d'Anglet (5)
US Chauny (7)	0–4	ES Troyes (2)
Avenir Sportif de Gouzon (8)	1–3 (a.e.t.)	Jarnac Sports (9)
AS Poissy (5)	2–1	FC Hienghène (New Caledonia)

Home team	Score	Away team
17 November
AS Dragon (French Polynesia)	0–1	ASM Belfort (4)
US Sainte-Marienne (Réunion)	2–0	Paris FC (3)
CO Saint-Dizier (7)	1–1 (4–3 p)	FC Melun (6)
AS Strasbourg Elsau Portugais (7)	0–2	Jura Sud Lavans (4)
La Tour Saint Clair FC (7)	0–0 (1–3 p)	Rodez AF (4)
Jarville JF (6)	4–1	AS Prix-lès-Mézières (6)
FC Charvieu-Chavagneux (6)	1–0	CS Louhans-Cuiseaux (5)
Marcq en Baroeul (8)	1–0	Tremblay FC (9)
St. Etienne Metare (10)	0–4	FA Ile Rousse Monticello (5)
Jœuf (8)	0–3	US Sarre-Union (4)
Entente Roche Novillars (6)	1–2	Dinsheim SC (6)
FC Annecy-le-Vieux (8)	1–3	AS Yzeure (4)
Blanc Mesnil Sport Football (6)	1–2 (a.e.t.)	CS Brétigny Football (7)
Elan Boucalais (9)	0–1	US Chauvigny (6)
AS Fabrègues (6)	2–0	FC Gémenos (7)
FC Foix (8)	0–2	Grenoble Foot (4)
FC Geispolheim (6)	0–4	FC Villefranche (4)
ESM Gonfreville (6)	0–1	Stade Plabennec (4)
Vendée Poiré-sur-Vie (3)	0–3	SAS Épinal (4)
FC Juventus Papus (8)	0–4	AS Béziers (4)
FC La Cayolle (7)	1–0	GS Consolat Marseille (4)
FC La Chaize-le-Vicomte (8)	1–2	SU Dives (6)
La Suze FC (6)	3–0	FC Mulsanne-Teloché (6)
SC Le Rheu (9)	1–1 (5–4 p)	FC Saint-Brieuc (7)
FC Les Lilas (6)	3–1	ES Reims Sainte-Anne (6)
FC Maintenon-Pierres (7)	3–2	AS Angoulême (5)
FC Marquette (6)	1–3 (a.e.t.)	US Boulogne (3)
LD St. Maur Lusi (6)	1–2	AS Beauvais (4)
AM Neiges Le Havre (6)	1–4	Toulouse Croix-D'Aurade (5)
Neufchâtel-en-Bray (8)	0–6	Boulogne ACBB (6)
Olympique de Neuilly (10)	1–0	Plessis Robinson 92 (7)
FC Saint-Amand (6)	1–0	Le Havre AC (2)
St-Pryvé St-Hilaire FC (5)	3–0	Stade Portelois (6)
US Thouaré (8)	0–3	AS de Cherbourg (4)
AS Vignoc Hédé Guipel (8)	2–1	Auray FC (7)
ES Wasquehal (5)	0–2	US Chantilly (6)
ES Bressane (7)	0–1	Sporting Toulon (6)
ESOF La Roche-sur-Yon (5)	8–3	AJ Kani Keli (Mayotte)
US Lège-Cap-Ferret (5)	0–2	Vendée Luçon FC (3)
SC Schiltigheim (5)	3–0	CS Veymerange Elange (6)
Stade Montois (4)	2–0	La Berrichonne de Châteauroux (2)
CSO 1919 Amnéville (5)	1–1 (4–5 p)	FC Metz (2)
AFC Creil (6)	0–5	Racing Club de Lens (2)
RC Strasbourg (3)	1–2	AS Nancy-Lorraine (2)
23 November
Villeneuve-d'Ascq Métropole (9)	1–2	AC Amiens (4)

== Eighth round ==
Home team	Score	Away team
7 December
FC Charvieux-Chavagneux (6)	1–2	AS Moulins (4)
Boulogne ACBB (6)	1–1 (3–4 p)	AS Beauvais (4)
Jarnac Sports (9)	0–3	Les Herbiers VF (4)
US Chantilly (6)	1–2	FC Chambly (4)
Chassieu Decines FC (6)	0–2	CA Bastia (2)
US Raon-l'Étape (4)	2–0	US Sainte-Marienne (Réunion)
AC Amiens (4)	1–0 (a.e.t.)	Stade Lavallois (2)
CA Pontarlier (5)	2–0	US Sarre-Union (4)
SC Schiltigheim (5)	0–1	US Boulogne (3)
AS Yzeure (4)	0–0 (4–2 p)	AS Lyon-Duchère (4)
FC Sète 34 (5)	1–0	Grenoble Foot (4)
ESOF La Roche-sur-Yon (5)	3–0	US Chauvigny (6)
Magny (6)	1–1 (5–4 p)	ASM Belfort (4)
SC Selongey (6)	0–1	FC Bourg-Péronnas (3)
AS de Cherbourg (4)	1–3	Stade Brest (2)
AS du Pays Neslois (6)	1–4	Racing Club de Lens (2)
Balma SC (5)	0–1 (a.e.t.)	Aubagne FC (5)
CO Saint-Dizier (7)	1–3	Monts d'Or Azergues Foot (4)
St-Pryvé St-Hilaire FC (5)	0–2 (a.e.t.)	SM Caen (2)
SU Dives (6)	0–1 (a.e.t.)	Stade Plabennec (4)
USL Dunkerque (3)	0–1	SO Romorantin (4)
AS Béziers (4)	1–4	FC Istres (2)
FA Ile Rousse Monticello (5)	3–2 (a.e.t.)	FC Villefranche (4)
Vendée Luçon FC (3)	4–4 (3–4 p)	Niort FC (2)
US Concarneau (4)	2–1	Lannion FC (5)
Bressuire FC (6)	2–1 (a.e.t.)	Stade Montois (4)
FC Villenave (4)	4–4 (3–4 p)	Angers SCO (2)
US Carquefou (3)	4–1	AS Vitré (4)

Home team	Score	Away team
8 December
FC Saint-Amand (6)	5–2	Dinsheim SC (6)
Jarville JF (6)	0–1	AS Poissy (5)
AS Cannes (4)	2–1	ES Troyes (2)
AS Fabrègues (6)	1–6	Dijon FCO (2)
FC La Cayolle (7)	4–1	Olympique Alès (5)
AS Vignoc Hédé Guipel (8)	0–3 (a.e.t.)	Quimperlé FC (7)
CS Brétigny Football (7)	1–1 (4–5 p)	Jura Sud Lavans (4)
FC Maintenon-Pierres (7)	0–2	La Suze FC (6)
FC Les Lilas (6)	0–1 (a.e.t.)	Toulouse Croix-D'Aurade (5)
Olympique de Neuilly (10)	1–2	Marcq en Baroeul (8)
SC Le Rheu (9)	0–3	US Avranches (4)
US Saint-Malo (4)	0–2	Vannes OC (3)
SAS Épinal (4)	1–0	Arras FC (5)
Sporting Toulon (6)	0–1	Rodez AF (4)
AJ Auxerre (2)	3–1	AS Nancy-Lorraine (2)
9 December
US Créteil (2)	1–0	FC Metz (2)

== Round of 64 ==
4 January 2014	US Avranches (4)	1–3	Lens (2)	Avranches
12:00	Créhin 53'	Report	Coulibaly 79'; N'Diaye 84'; Cabon 90' (o.g.)	Stadium: Stade René Fenouillère; Referee: Christian Guillard

4 January 2014	SAS Épinal (4)	1–4	Chamois Niortais (2)	Épinal
14:30	Coignard 79'	Report	Roye 14' (pen.); Martin 58'; Lafourcade 84'; Mayi 87'	Stadium: Stade de la Colombière; Referee: Alexandre Perreau Niel

4 January 2014	CA Pontarlier (5)	1–3	Stade Malherbe Caen (2)	Pontarlier
14:30	Letellier 69'	Report	Kanté 6'; Fajr 48'; Nangis 90'	Stadium: Stade Paul Robbe 1 Referee: Hakim Ben El Hadj

4 January 2014	Monts d'Or Azergues Foot (4)	1–1 (a.e.t.) (3–2 p)	Istres (2)	Chasselay
14:30	Giuly 52'	Report	Diarra 69'	Stadium: Stade Ludovic Giuly; Referee: Johan Hamel
	Penalties
	Genet (penalty scored); Douline (penalty scored); Moukhadam (penalty missed); Ertek (penalty scored)		Barrillon (penalty scored); Dabo (penalty missed); Mas (penalty missed); Allart (penalty scored); Nouvel (penalty missed)

4 January 2014	FC Chambly (4)	1–1 (a.e.t.) (5–6 p)	Angers SCO (2)	Chambly
15:30	Marena 58'	Report	Blayac 32'	Stadium: Stade des Marais; Referee: Florent Batta

4 January 2014	Aubagne FC (5)	3–3 (a.e.t.) (4–5 p)	Dijon FCO (2)	Aubagne
16:00	da Costa 13'; Dridi 87'; Batret 114' (pen.)	Report	Babit 80'; Cissé 90+2'; Berenguer 120+1'	Stadium: Stade de Lattre de Tassigny; Referee: Sylvain Palhies
	Penalties
	Reggad (penalty scored); Batret (penalty scored); Guidoni (penalty scored); De (penalty scored) (penalty scored)		Philippoteaux (penalty scored); Bamba (penalty scored); Diallo (penalty scored); Berenguer (penalty scored); Cissé (penalty scored)

4 January 2014	La Roche VF (6)	0–3 (a.e.t.)	CA Bastia (2)	La Roche-sur-Yon
16:00		Report	Pastorelli 107', 115'; Philippon 109'	Stadium: Stade Henri Desgrange; Referee: Jean-Charles Cailleux

4 January 2014	Magny Renaussance S (6)	1–6	AS Moulins (4)	Metz
16:00	Chirre 38' (pen.)	Report	Ruffaut 17', 39'; Berthomier 28' da Silva 75'; Camara 77'; Lobo 87'	Stadium: Stade du Plateau; Referee: Sébastien Moreira

4 January 2014	AS Yzeure (4)	1–0	FC Lorient (1)	Yzeure
17:00	Mbida 25'	Report		Stadium: Stade de Bellevue; Referee: Tony Chapron

4 January 2014	US Boulogne (3)	3–1	AS Beauvais Oise (4)	Boulogne-sur-Mer
18:00	Keita 28', 80'; Dia 82'	Report	Ouedraogo 25'	Stadium: Stade de la Libération; Referee: Mickaël Leleu

4 January 2014	Les Herbiers VF (4)	0–1	Stade Plabennecois (4)	Les Herbiers
18:00		Report	Richetin 69'	Stadium: Stade Massabielle; Referee: Olivier Husset

4 January 2014	AS Poissy (5)	0–1	US Concarneau (4)	Poissy
18:00		Report	N'Zinga 71'	Stadium: Stade Léo Lagrange; Referee: Abdelali Chaoui

4 January 2014	Rennes (1)	1–1 (a.e.t.) (8–7 p)	Valenciennes FC (1)	Rennes
20:40	Féret 61' (pen.)	Report	Dossevi 74'	Stadium: Stade de la Route de Lorient; Referee: Benoît Bastien
	Penalties
	Armand (penalty scored); Saïd (penalty scored); Féret (penalty scored); Oliveira (penalty missed); Kana-Biyik (penalty scored); Danzé (penalty scored); Doucouré (penalty scored); Hunou (penalty scored); Bakayoko (penalty scored)		Ducourtioux (penalty missed); Dossevi (penalty scored); Néry (penalty scored); Kagelmacher (penalty scored); Melikson (penalty scored); Lala (penalty scored); Massampu (penalty scored); Ciss (penalty scored) da Silva (penalty missed)

5 January 2014	Olympique Marcquois Football (6)	2–6	AJ Auxerre (2)	Marcq-en-Baroeul
12:00	Depre 18' (pen.); Fatras 20'	Report	Viale 1'; Coulibaly 6'; Ntep 7'; Ngando 59'; Kitambala 89'; Sammaritano 90+1'	Stadium: Stade Georges Niquet; Referee: Ruddy Buquet

5 January 2014	FC Bourg-Péronnas (3)	0–2	En Avant de Guingamp (1)	Péronnas
14:00		Report	Beauvue 10'; Yatabaré 30'	Stadium: Stade Marcel-Verchère; Referee: Clément Turpin

5 January 2014	AS de la Cayolle (6)	0–2	FA Ile Rousse Monticello (5)	Martigues
14:00		Report	Di. Menozzi 86'; Santelli 89'	Stadium: Stade Francis Turan; Referee: Amaury Delerue

5 January 2014	FC Saint-Amand (6)	1–1 (a.e.t.) (2–4 p)	Iris Club de Croix (5)	Saint-Amand-les-Eaux
14:00	Rjillo 35'	Report	Lorthiois 45+2'	Stadium: Stade Municipal; Referee: Yohann Rouinsard
	Penalties
	Willemot (penalty missed); Florent (penalty missed); Galant (penalty scored); Rjillo (penalty scored)		Zmijak (penalty scored); Delacourt (penalty scored); Lorthiois (penalty scored); Robail (penalty missed); De Araujo (penalty scored)

5 January 2014	Amiens (3)	1–3	Lille (1)	Amiens
14:15	Benaries 6'	Report	Kalou 23', 57'; Rodelin 66'	Stadium: Stade de la Licorne

5 January 2014	Bastia (1)	1–0	Evian (1)	Bastia
14:15	Raspentino 19'	Report		Stadium: Stade Armand Cesari; Referee: Fredy Fautrel

5 January 2014	La Suze-sur-Sarthe FC (6)	1–6	Lyon (1)	Le Mans
14:15	Pichot 40' (pen.)	Report	Gomis 5', 58'; Grenier 42'; Lacazette 59', 81'; Malbranque 67'	Stadium: MMArena; Referee: Stéphane Jochem

5 January 2014	Nantes (1)	0–2	Nice (1)	Nantes
14:15		Report	Digard 7'; Brüls 89'	Stadium: Stade de la Beaujoire

5 January 2014	US Raon-l'Étape (4)	1–2	Bordeaux (1)	Raon l'Etape
14:15	Patin 68'	Report	Saivet 14' (pen.); Bellion 86'	Stadium: Stade Paul Gasser

5 January 2014	Rodez AF (4)	0–2	Montpellier (1)	Rodez
14:15		Report	Mézague 10'; Niang 65' (pen.)	Stadium: Stade Paul Lignon

5 January 2014	FC Quimperlois 29 (6)	1–2	Ajaccio (1)	Quimperlé
14:15	Gall 17'	Report	Faty 29'; Eduardo 59'	Stadium: Stade Jean Charter

5 January 2014	Vannes (3)	2–3	Monaco (1)	Vannes
17:00	Cakin 1'; Aguemon 35'	Report	Falcao 2'; Rodríguez 41'; Carrasco 86'	Stadium: Stade de la Rabine; Referee: Sébastien Desiage

5 January 2014	Sète 34 (5)	2–0	Carquefou (3)	Sète
18:00	Gelly 22'; Rouve 48'	Report		Stadium: Stade Louis Michel; Referee: Floris Aubin

5 January 2014	Marseille (1)	2–0 (a.e.t.)	Reims (1)	Marseille
20:45	Gignac 93', 115'			Stadium: Stade Vélodrome

8 January 2014	Brest (2)	2–5	Paris Saint-Germain (1)	Brest
19:00	Lesoimier 32'; Ayité 90'		Ibrahimović 11', 40', 42'; Motta 15'; Lavezzi 47'	Stadium: Stade Francis le Blé

8 January 2014	Jura Sud (4)	1–0	Créteil Lusitanos (2)	Lavans-lès-Saint-Claude
20:00	Gomariz 19'	Report		Stadium: Stade Municipal de Moirans; Referee: Frank Schneider

14 January 2014	Cannes (4)	1–1 (a.e.t.) (4–3 p)	Saint-Étienne (1)	Cannes
18:30	Darnet 69'		Brandão 20'	Stadium: Stade Pierre-de-Coubertin
	Penalties
	Gauthier (penalty missed); Zobiri (penalty scored); Chmielinski (penalty scored); Cériélo (penalty missed); Lenzini (penalty scored); Rouabah (penalty scored)		Cohade (penalty missed); Pogba (penalty scored); Ghoulam (penalty scored); Gradel (penalty scored); Lemoine (penalty missed); Erdinç (penalty missed)

== Round of 32 ==
21 January 2014	Ajaccio (1)	0–2	Caen (2)	Ajaccio
18:00			Autret 63'; Fajr 74'	Stadium: Stade François Coty; Referee: Ennjimi Said

21 January 2014	Lens (2)	2–1 (a.e.t.)	Bastia (1)	Lens
18:30	Chavarría 88'; N'Diaye 94'		Khazri 63'	Stadium: Stade Bollaert-Delelis; Referee: Lionel Jaffredo

21 January 2014	Angers (2)	1–0	Sochaux (1)	Angers
19:00	Konaté 70'			Stadium: Stade Jean-Bouin; Referee: Bastien Benoit

21 January 2014	Boulogne-sur-Mer (3)	0–2	Rennes (1)	Boulogne-sur-Mer
19:00			Konradsen 9'; Romero 90+1'	Stadium: Stade de la Libération; Referee: Bien Wilfried

21 January 2014	Sète (5)	2–0	Jura Sud (4)	Sète
19:00	Gelly 34'; Gensel 63'			Stadium: Stade Louis Michel; Referee: Alexandre Castro

21 January 2014	Iris Club de Croix (5)	0–3	Lille (1)	Lille
19:30			Kjær 17'; Melo 57'; Origi 88'	Stadium: Stade Pierre-Mauroy; Referee: Mikael Lesage

21 January 2014	Concarneau (4)	2–3 (a.e.t.)	Guingamp (1)	Concarneau
19:30	Gargam 83', 99'		Yatabaré 64', 103'; Beauvue 104'	Stadium: Stade Guy Piriou

21 January 2014	CA Bastia (2)	2–2 (a.e.t.) (5–4 p)	Niort (2)	Bastia
20:00	Camara 35'; Mba 89'		Lafourcade 73' (pen.); Oswald 85' (o.g.)	Stadium: Stade Armand Cesari
	Penalties
	Cropanese (penalty scored); Di Fraya (penalty scored); Vincent (penalty scored); Mba (penalty scored); N'Diaye (penalty scored)		(penalty scored) Bernard; (penalty scored) Pallois; (penalty scored) Roye; (penalty scored) Sala; (penalty missed) Glombard

21 January 2014	Marseille (1)	4–5	Nice (1)	Marseille
21:00	Gignac 3', 58'; Thauvin 24'; Diawara 90+2'		Bosetti 5'; Maupay 18'; Diawara 45' (o.g.); Brüls 51' (pen.); Abriel 88'	Stadium: Stade Vélodrome

22 January 2014	Monts (4)	0–3	Monaco (1)	Lyon
17:00			Falcao 29'; Rivière 63', 72'	Stadium: Stade de Gerland

22 January 2014	Monticello (5)	0–0 (a.e.t.) (4–3 p)	Bordeaux (1)	Ajaccio
18:00				Stadium: Stade Ange Casanova

22 January 2014	Yzeure (4)	1–3	Lyon (1)	Clermont-Ferrand
19:00	E. M'Baye 74'		Briand 76'; Gourcuff 80'; Malbranque 83'	Stadium: Stade Gabriel Montpied

22 January 2014	Moulins (4)	2–1	Toulouse (1)	Moulins
19:30	Da Silva 46', 86'		Ben Basat 31'	Stadium: Stade Hector Rolland

22 January 2014	Paris Saint-Germain (1)	1–2	Montpellier (1)	Paris
20:55	Cavani 30'		Congré 20'; Montaño 69'	Stadium: Parc des Princes

23 January 2014	Auxerre (2)	3–2 (a.e.t.)	Dijon FCO (2)	Auxerre
18:30	Aït Ben Idir 35'; Ntep 64'; Kitambala 120+1'		Berenguer 65'; Tavares 82'	Stadium: Stade de l'Abbe Deschamps

23 January 2014	Cannes (4)	1–0	Plabennec (4)	Cannes
20:00	Zobiri 28'			Stadium: Stade Pierre de Coubertin

== Round of 16 ==
11 February 2014	Cannes (4)	1–0 (a.e.t.)	Montpellier (1)	Cannes
18:30	Zobiri 119'	Report		Stadium: Stade Pierre de Coubertin; Attendance: 4,000; Referee: Ruddy Buquet

11 February 2014	Angers (2)	4–2 (a.e.t.)	CA Bastia (2)	Angers
20:00	Ayari 57'; Diers 105+2'; Yattara 113'; Blayac 117'		Mba 30', 105'	Stadium: Stade Jean-Bouin; Attendance: 6,401; Referee: Olivier Thual

11 February 2014	Lille (1)	3–3 (a.e.t.) (6–5 p)	Caen (2)	Villeneuve d'Ascq
20:45	Rodelin 33'; Delaplace 77'; Roux 83'	Report	Koita 14', 29'; Rodelin 90+3' (o.g.)	Stadium: Stade Pierre-Mauroy; Attendance: 7,000; Referee: Lionel Jaffredo
	Penalties
	Baša (penalty scored); Balmont (penalty scored); Origi (penalty scored); Rodelin (penalty scored); Sidibé (penalty scored); Rozehnal (penalty scored)		Saad (penalty scored); Duhamel (penalty scored); Calvé (penalty scored); Appiah (penalty scored); Kodjia (penalty scored); Autret (penalty missed)

12 February 2014	Monticello (5)	0–2	Guingamp (1)	Ajaccio
16:45		Report	Cerdan 40'; Diallo 57'	Stadium: Stade François Coty; Referee: Antony Gautier

12 February 2014	Auxerre (2)	0–1	Rennes (1)	Auxerre
18:45		Report	Kadir 23'	Stadium: Stade de l'Abbé-Deschamps; Attendance: 6,968; Referee: Alexandre Castro

12 February 2014	Moulins (4)	3–1	Sète (5)	Moulins
19:30	da Silva 43', 53'; Burdin 90'		Rouve 3'	Stadium: Stade Hector Rolland; Referee: Wilfried Bien

12 February 2014	Nice (1)	0–1 (a.e.t.)	Monaco (1)	Nice
20:55		Report	Berbatov 114'	Stadium: Allianz Riviera; Attendance: 20,420; Referee: Nicolas Rainville

13 February 2014	Lyon (1)	1–2 (a.e.t.)	Lens (2)	Lyon
20:45	Briand 9'	(Report)	Valdivia 90+2' (pen.); Gbamin 94'	Stadium: Stade de Gerland; Attendance: 14,703; Referee: Clément Turpin

== Quarter-finals ==
25 March 2014	Moulins (4)	0−0 (a.e.t.) (2−4 p)	Angers (2)	Gueugnon
20:45		Report		Stadium: Stade Jean Laville; Attendance: 11,950; Referee: Alexandre Castro
	Penalties
	Lobo (penalty missed); Rouchon (penalty missed); Carmo (penalty scored); El Hajri (penalty scored)		Eudeline (penalty missed); Bouka Moutou (penalty scored); Malicki (penalty scored); Angoula (penalty scored); Ayari (penalty scored)

26 March 2014	Cannes (4)	0−2	Guingamp (1)	Cannes
18:45		Report	Yatabaré 71', 83'	Stadium: Stade Pierre de Coubertin; Attendance: 6,500; Referee: Clément Turpin

26 March 2014	Monaco (1)	6–0	Lens (2)	Monaco
20:55	Ocampos 17', 67'; Berbatov 41'; Rivière 54'; Fabinho 58'; Kondogbia 85'	Report		Stadium: Stade Louis II; Attendance: 6,000; Referee: Benoît Bastien

27 March 2014	Rennes (1)	2–0	Lille (1)	Rennes
20:45	Grosicki 34'; Alessandrini 90'			Stadium: Stade de la Route de Lorient; Attendance: 27,849; Referee: Laurent Duhamel

== Semi-finals ==
15 April 2014	Rennes (1)	3–2	Angers (2)	Rennes
21:00	Toivonen 5'; Grosicki 35'; Makoun 48'	Report	M. Yattara 2', 89' (pen.)	Stadium: Stade de la Route de Lorient; Attendance: 28,857; Referee: Saïd Ennjimi

16 April 2014	Guingamp (1)	3–1 (a.e.t.)	Monaco (1)	Guingamp
21:00	Yatabaré 6', 117'; Atık 112'	Report	Berbatov 36'	Stadium: Stade du Roudourou; Attendance: 15,758; Referee: Antony Gautier

== Final ==
3 May 2014
20:45 CEST

Rennes	0–2	Guingamp
	Report; Report	Martins Pereira 37'; Yatabaré 46'

Stade de France, Saint-Denis
Attendance: 80,000
Referee: Tony Chapron (Rhône-Alpes)

== Media coverage ==
For the sixth consecutive and final season In France, France Télévisions were the free to air broadcasters while Eurosport were the subscription broadcasters.

These matches were broadcast live on French television:

Round	France Télévisions	Eurosport
Seventh Round		
8th round		
Round of 64		
Round of 32		
Round of 16		
Quarter-finals		
Semi-finals		
Final		
