= 2008–09 SC Bastia season =

SC Bastia
2008–09 season
- Chairman: Charles Orlanducci
- Manager: Bernard Casoni
- Stadium: Stade Armand Cesari
- Ligue 2: 11th
- Coupe de France: 8. round
- Coupe de la Ligue: End of 32
- Top goalscorer: League: Pierre-Yves André (10); All: Pierre-Yves André (10)
- Highest home attendance: 4,275 vs Guingamp (22 August 2008)
- Lowest home attendance: 2,097 vs Tours (13 February 2009)
- Average home league attendance: 2,847
Home colours	Away colours

French football club SC Bastia's 2008–09 season. Finished 11th place in league. Top scorer of the season, including 10 goals in 10 league matches have been Pierre-Yves André. Was eliminated to Coupe de France 8. round, the Coupe de la Ligue was able to be among the final 32 teams.

== Transfers ==
=== In ===
Summer

- Macedo Novaes from Arles
- Ludovic Genest from Auxerre
- Salim Moizini from Saint-Priest
- Abdelmalek Cherrad from MC Alger
- Mehdi Méniri from Al-Khor
- Jean-François Grimaldi from Bastia B
- Sony Mustivar from Bastia B
- Wahbi Khazri from Bastia B
- Darko Dunjić from Zorya Luhansk
- Yamen Ben Zekri from Zamalek
- Hervé Kambou and Nassa Guy Roland Niangbo from Olympic Charleroi
- Issoumaila Dao from free

Winter

- Nicolas Marin from Lorient
- Éric Cubilier from free

=== Out ===
Summer

- Gary Coulibaly to Istres
- Chaouki Ben Saada and Kafoumba Coulibaly to Nice
- Grégory Lorenzi to Brest
- Xavier Pentecôte to Toulouse
- Alexandre Licata to AS Monaco
- Damien Bridonneau to Vannes
- Jean-Louis Leca to Valenciennes
- Samir Bertin d'Avesnes to Evian

Winter

- No.

== Squad ==
As of 24 June 2012

Note: Flags indicate national team as defined under FIFA eligibility rules; some limited exceptions apply. Players may hold more than one non-FIFA nationality.

No.	Pos.	Nation	Player
1	GK	(Nigeria) NGA	Austin Ejide
2	MF	(Tunisia) TUN	Wahbi Khazri
3	DF	(France) FRA	Arnaud Maire
4	DF	(Tunisia) TUN	Yamen Ben Zekri
5	DF	(Serbia) SRB	Darko Dunjić
6	DF	(France) FRA	Hassoun Camara
7	FW	(Algeria) ALG	Abdelmalek Cherrad
8	MF	(France) FRA	Yohan Gomez
9	DF	(Ivory Coast) CIV	Issoumaila Dao
10	MF	(France) FRA	Ludovic Genest (on loan from Auxerre)
11	MF	(Senegal) SEN	Frédéric Mendy
12	MF	(France) FRA	Serisay Barthélémy
13	MF	(France) FRA	Salim Moizini
14	FW	(Burkina Faso) BFA	Henoc Conombo
15	MF	(France) FRA	Nicolas Marin (on loan from Lorient)
16	GK	(Brazil) BRA	Macedo Novaes
17	FW	(Ivory Coast) CIV	Guy-Roland Niangbo

No.	Pos.	Nation	Player
18	MF	(France) FRA	Yannick Cahuzac
19	FW	(France) FRA	Christophe Gaffory
20	FW	(France) FRA	Pierre-Yves André (captain)
21	DF	(Algeria) ALG	Féthi Harek
22	MF	(France) FRA	Soni Mustivar
23	DF	(Algeria) ALG	Mehdi Méniri
24	MF	(France) FRA	Florent Ghisolfi
25	MF	(Ivory Coast) CIV	Hervé Kambou
26	MF	(France) FRA	Fabrice Jau
27	DF	(France) FRA	Éric Cubilier
28	MF	(France) FRA	Jean-François Grimaldi
29	DF	(France) FRA	Nicolas Martinetti
30	GK	(Cameroon) CMR	Jules Goda
31	DF	(France) FRA	Johan Martial
40	GK	(France) FRA	Dominique Agostini
50	GK	(France) FRA	Jonathan Matijas

== Ligue 2 ==
=== League table ===
Pos	Team	Pld	W	D	L	GF	GA	GD	Pts	Promotion or Relegation
9	Sedan	38	13	12	13	46	49	−3	51	
10	Vannes	38	14	9	15	34	45	−11	51	
11	Bastia	38	13	9	16	38	47	−9	48	
12	Clermont	38	12	11	15	46	50	−4	47	
13	Guingamp (Q)	38	10	16	12	37	35	+2	46	Qualification to Europa League play-off round (Note: Coupe de France winners Guingamp qualify for the 2009–10 UEFA Europa League Play-off round of 2009–10 UEFA Europa League.)

Source: Ligue 2
(Q) Qualified for the phase indicated

=== Results summary ===
Overall								Home						Away					
Pld	W	D	L	GF	GA	GD	Pts	W	D	L	GF	GA	GD	W	D	L	GF	GA	GD
38	13	9	16	38	47	−9	48	9	6	4	29	20	+9	4	3	12	9	27	−18

Last updated: 23 June 2012.
Source: lfp.fr

=== Results by round ===
Round	1	2	3	4	5	6	7	8	9	10	11	12	13	14	15	16	17	18	19	20	21	22	23	24	25	26	27	28	29	30	31	32	33	34	35	36	37	38
Ground	A	H	A	H	A	H	A	H	A	H	A	A	H	A	H	A	H	A	H	A	H	A	H	A	H	A	H	A	H	H	A	H	A	H	A	H	A	H
Result	W	D	L	W	W	D	L	D	L	D	D	L	W	L	L	W	W	L	W	L	D	L	W	W	L	L	W	L	L	W	D	L	L	W	D	D	L	W
Position	3	7	12	7	5	5	7	8	9	9	12	13	10	13	15	13	9	10	10	10	10	14	12	9	11	12	11	12	13	11	12	12	14	11	11	11	13	11

W = Win; D = Draw; L = Loss

=== Matches ===
Date	Opponent	H / A	Result	Goal(s)	Attendance	Referee
1 August 2008	Troyes	A	1 - 2	Genest 11', Cherrad 38'	8,169	Ludovic Rémy
8 August 2008	Angers	H	0 - 0	-	5,630	Olivier Thual
15 August 2008	Strasbourg	A	1 - 0	-	13,087	Hervé Piccirillo
22 August 2008	Guingamp	H	2 - 1	André 31', Barthélémy 52', (yellow card) 69' (yellow-red card) Méniri	4,275	Jérôme Auroux
29 August 2008	Tours	A	0 - 1	André 6'	6,582	Lionel Jaffredo
12 September 2008	Amiens	H	2 - 2	André 14', 50'	2,957	Wilfried Bien
19 September 2008	Boulogne	A	1 - 0	-	4,875	Sandryk Biton
26 September 2008	Reims	H	2 - 2	Genest 10' (pen.), H. Camara 60'	2,877	Tony Chapron
3 October 2008	Montpellier	A	2 - 1	Méniri 21'	7,039	Pascal Viléo
10 October 2008	Dijon	H	0 - 0	-	2,631	Philippe Chat
17 October 2008	Metz	A	0 - 0	-	7,329	Philippe Kalt
24 October 2008	Châteauroux	A	2 - 0	-	5,090	Christian Guillard
31 October 2008	Sedan	H	2 - 0	André 84', F. Mendy 85'	2,253	Olivier Husset
7 November 2008	Brest	A	4 - 0	H. Camara (red card) 34'	6,065	Jérôme Auroux
14 November 2008	Lens	H	0 - 1	-	2,814	Saïd Ennjimi
28 November 2008	Vannes	A	0 - 1	André 48'	2,826	Philippe Malige
5 December 2008	Ajaccio	H	6 - 2	H. Camara 15', 53', Jau 16', 66', Barthélémy 73', André 77'	3,708	Éric Poulat
19 December 2008	Nîmes	A	1 - 0	H. Camara (yellow card) 39' (yellow-red card)	6,921	Christian Guillard
9 January 2009	Clermont	H	2 - 1	André 21', Marin 68'	2,349	Stéphane Djiouzi
16 January 2009	Angers	A	2 - 0	-	5,450	Didier Falcone
30 January 2009	Strasbourg	H	1 - 1	F. Mendy 11'	2,706	Olivier Thual
6 February 2009	Guingamp	A	4 - 1	André 6' (pen.)	9,688	Clément Turpin
13 February 2009	Tours	H	2 - 0	Genest 84', Jau 90'	2,097	Sébastien Moreira
20 February 2009	Amiens	A	0 - 1	Barthélémy 86'	8,741	Abdelali Chaoui
27 February 2009	Boulogne	H	1 - 3	Genest 25'	2,388	Bruno Ruffray
6 March 2009	Reims	A	2 - 0	-	10,787	Ludovic Rémy
13 March 2009	Montpellier	H	1 - 0	Marin (red card) 44', Khazri 83'	2,429	Stéphane Lannoy
20 March 2009	Dijon	A	2 - 0	-	3,547	Abdelali Chaoui
27 March 2009	Metz	H	1 - 2	Gomez 10'	2,630	Olivier Lamarre
3 April 2009	Châteauroux	H	2 - 1	Cériélo 82' (o.g.), Cherrad 89'	2,376	Pascal Viléo
10 April 2009	Sedan	A	1 - 1	Marin 29', André (red card) 89'	7,516	Sandryk Biton
17 April 2009	Brest	H	0 - 2	-	2,604	Philippe Malige
24 April 2009	Lens	A	1 - 0	-	37,890	Jérôme Auroux
1 May 2009	Vannes	H	3 - 1	Khazri 25', Marin 45', Jau 63'	2,560	Christian Guillard
8 May 2009	Ajaccio	A	1 - 1	André 27', Cahuzac (yellow card) 56' (yellow-red card)	4,556	Fredy Fautrel
15 May 2009	Nîmes	H	0 - 0	-	2,489	Ludovic Rémy
22 May 2009	Clermont	A	2 - 0	-	7,563	Sandryk Biton
29 May 2009	Troyes	H	2 - 1	Khazri 29', Gaffory 88'	2,322	Bruno Ruffray

== Coupe de France ==
Date	Round	Opponent	H / A	Result	Goal(s)	Attendance	Referee
22 November 2008	7th tour	Luzenac	A	[ 1 - 2]	Genest 19', 80'	1,000	Sandryk Biton
13 December 2008	8th tour	Clermont	A	[ 1 - 0]		1,570	Thierry Auriac

== Coupe de la Ligue ==
Date	Round	Opponent	H / A	Result	Goal(s)	Attendance	Referee
9 September 2008	Second tour	Strasbourg	A	1 - 2 (a.e.t.)	Jau 66', Cherrad 105'	4,587	Didier Falcone
23 September 2008	End of 32	Châteauroux	H	0 - 1		1,735	Alexandre Castro

== Statistics ==
=== Top scorers ===
As of 23 June 2012

Place	Position	Nation	Name	Ligue 2	Coupe de France	Coupe de la Ligue	Total
1	FW	(France)	Pierre-Yves André	10	0	0	10
2	FW	(France)	Ludovic Genest	4	2	0	6
3	MF	(France)	Fabrice Jau	4	0	1	5
4	MF	(France)	Nicolas Marin	3	0	0	3
=	FW	(Tunisia)	Wahbi Khazri	3	0	0	3
=	MF	(France)	Serisay Barthélémy	3	0	0	3
=	DF	(France)	Hassoun Camara	3	0	0	3
=	FW	(Algeria)	Abdelmalek Cherrad	2	0	1	3
9	MF	(Senegal)	Frédéric Mendy	2	0	0	2
10	FW	(France)	Christophe Gaffory	1	0	0	1
=	DF	(Algeria)	Mehdi Méniri	1	0	0	1
=	DF	(France)	Yohan Gomez	1	0	0	1

=== League top assists ===
As of 23 June 2012

Place	Position	Nation	Name	Assists
1	FW	(France)	Ludovic Genest	5
2	FW	(France)	Pierre-Yves André	4
3	MF	(France)	Nicolas Marin	2
=	MF	(France)	Fabrice Jau	2
=	MF	(France)	Serisay Barthélémy	2
=	MF	(Senegal)	Frédéric Mendy	2
7	MF	(Tunisia)	Wahbi Khazri	1
=	DF	(Serbia)	Darko Dunjić	1
=	DF	(France)	Hassoun Camara	1
=	DF	(Algeria)	Féthi Harek	1
