= 2013–14 Valenciennes FC season =

Valenciennes
- Manager: Daniel Sanchez (until 7 October 2013); Ariël Jacobs (from 14 October 2013)
- Stadium: Stade du Hainaut
- Ligue 1: 19th (relegated)
- Coupe de France: Round of 64
- Coupe de la Ligue: Third round
- Top goalscorer: League: Abdul Majeed Waris (9 goals); All: Abdul Majeed Waris (9 goals)

During the 2013–14 season Valenciennes competed in Ligue 1, the Coupe de France, and the Coupe de la Ligue.

== First-team squad ==
Note: Flags indicate national team as defined under FIFA eligibility rules; some limited exceptions apply. Players may hold more than one non-FIFA nationality.

No.	Pos.	Nation	Player
1	GK	FRA	Nicolas Penneteau
2	MF	FRA	David Ducourtioux (vice-captain)
3	DF	FRA	Arthur Masuaku
4	MF	CAF	Eloge Enza Yamissi
5	DF	CIV	Benjamin Angoua
6	MF	MLI	Tongo Doumbia
7	MF	SWE	Dusan Djurić
8	MF	ROU	Aurelian Chițu
9	FW	FRA	Jean-Christophe Bahebeck
10	MF	FRA	Mathieu Dossevi
11	MF	SEN	Pape Camara
13	DF	FRA	Mody Traoré
14	FW	FRA	Opa Nguette
16	GK	BRA	Macedo Novaes

No.	Pos.	Nation	Player
17	DF	FRA	Loris Néry
18	DF	FRA	Kenny Lala
19	FW	FRA	Anthony Le Tallec
20	DF	FRA	Lindsay Rose
21	DF	SEN	Saliou Ciss
22	FW	FRA	Kama Massampu
23	MF	FRA	José Saez
24	DF	URU	Gary Kagelmacher (on loan from AS Monaco)
25	DF	FRA	Rudy Mater (captain)
26	MF	FRA	Marco da Silva
27	MF	ISR	Maor Melikson
28	FW	FRA	Grégory Pujol
29	DF	FRA	Yves-Marie Kerjean
30	GK	FRA	Paul Charruau

== Competitions ==
=== Ligue 1 ===
==== League table ====
Pos	Team	Pld	W	D	L	GF	GA	GD	Pts	Qualification or relegation
16	Guingamp	38	11	9	18	34	42	−8	42	Qualification for the Europa League group stage
17	Nice	38	12	6	20	30	44	−14	42	
18	Sochaux (R)	38	10	10	18	37	61	−24	40	Relegation to Ligue 2
19	Valenciennes (R)	38	7	8	23	37	65	−28	29	Relegation to Ligue 2
20	Ajaccio (R)	38	4	11	23	37	72	−35	23	Relegation to Ligue 2

Source: Ligue 1
Rules for classification: 1) Points; 2) Goal difference; 3) Number of goals scored
(R) Relegated

==== Results summary ====
Overall								Home						Away					
Pld	W	D	L	GF	GA	GD	Pts	W	D	L	GF	GA	GD	W	D	L	GF	GA	GD
38	7	8	23	37	65	−28	29	4	5	10	23	31	−8	3	3	13	14	34	−20

Source: Ligue 1

==== Results by round ====
Round	1	2	3	4	5	6	7	8	9	10	11	12	13	14	15	16	17	18	19	20	21	22	23	24	25	26	27	28	29	30	31	32	33	34	35	36	37	38
Ground	H	A	H	A	H	A	H	A	H	A	H	A	H	A	H	A	H	A	A	H	A	H	A	H	A	H	A	H	A	H	A	H	A	H	A	H	H	A
Result	W	L	L	L	L	L	L	L	D	D	L	W	D	D	L	L	D	L	W	W	L	D	L	W	L	D	L	W	W	L	D	L	L	L	L	L	L	L
Position	2	6	13	16	18	19	19	20	20	20	20	18	18	18	18	18	18	18	18	18	18	18	18	18	18	18	18	18	18	18	18	18	19	19	19	19	19	19

Source: Ligue 1
A = Away; H = Home; W = Win; D = Draw; L = Loss

==== Matches ====
10 August 2013 Match 1	Valenciennes FC	3–0	Toulouse	Valenciennes
21:00	Dossevi (yellow card) 27'; Melikson 37' (pen.); Masuaku (yellow card) 49'; Saez 53'; Pujol 90+3'	Summary	Spajić (red card) 35'	Stadium: Stade du Hainaut; Attendance: 12,261; Referee: (France) Stephane Jochem

17 August 2013 Match 2	Bastia	2–0	Valenciennes FC	Bastia
20:00	Diakité (yellow card) 35'; Bruno 76'; Ba 79'	Summary	Ducourtioux (yellow card) 34'; Lala (yellow card) 69'	Stadium: Stade Armand Cesari; Attendance: 15,425; Referee: (France) Benoit Bastien

24 August 2013 Match 3	Valenciennes FC	0–1	Marseille	Valenciennes
17:00	Ducourtioux (yellow card) 8'	Summary	Diawara (yellow card) 36'; Fanni (yellow card) 44'; Cheyrou (yellow card) 56'; Gignac 84'	Stadium: Stade du Hainaut; Attendance: 19,007; Referee: (France) Lionel Jaffredo

31 August 2013 Match 4	FC Lorient	1–0	Valenciennes FC	Lorient
20:00	Aboubakar 14'; Baca (yellow card) 90+3'	Summary	Mater (yellow card) 34' (yellow-red card); Le Tallec (yellow card) 43'	Stadium: Stade du Moustoir; Attendance: 15,188; Referee: (France) Mikael Lesage

14 September 2013 Match 5	Valenciennes FC	1–3	Saint-Étienne	Valenciennes
20:00	Enza Yamissi (yellow card) 12'; Nguette (yellow card) 70'; Melikson 80' (pen.)	Summary	Corgnet 17', 53'; Hamouma 47'; Ghoulam (yellow card) 48'	Stadium: Stade du Hainaut; Attendance: 13,550; Referee: (France) Philippe Kalt

22 September 2013 Match 6	OGC Nice	4–0	Valenciennes FC	Nice
17:00	Cvitanich 32' (pen.); Bauthéac 44'; Brüls 69'; Bosetti 74'; Kolodziejczak (yellow card) 88'	Summary	Rose (yellow card) 4'; Eloge Enza Yamissi (yellow card) 24'	Stadium: Allianz Riviera; Attendance: 34,459; Referee: (France) Clement Turpin

25 September 2013 Match 7	Valenciennes FC	0–1	Paris Saint-Germain	Valenciennes
19:00	Ducourtioux (yellow card) 65'	Summary	Lavezzi (yellow card) 25'; Verratti (yellow card) 36'; Digne (yellow card) 41'; Cavani 45+2'; Rabiot (yellow card) 75'	Stadium: Stade du Hainaut; Attendance: 19,180; Referee: (France) Ruddy Buquet

28 September 2013 Match 8	Sochaux	2–0	Valenciennes FC	Montbéliard
20:00	Bakambu 12' (yellow card) 29'; Carlão 18'; Corchia (yellow card) 77'; Pouplin (yellow card) 79'; Rafaël Dias (yellow card) 90+2'	Summary	Ciss (yellow card) 7'; Rose (yellow card) 71'; Penneteau (yellow card) 76'	Stadium: Stade Auguste Bonal; Attendance: 14,579; Referee: (France) Amaury Delerue

5 October 2013 Match 9	Valenciennes FC	1–1	Stade de Reims	Valenciennes
20:00	Enza Yamissi 90'	Summary	Krychowiak (yellow card) 25'; Oniangue 30' (yellow card) 90+2'	Stadium: Stade du Hainaut; Attendance: 20,330; Referee: (France) Wilfried Bien

19 October 2013 Match 10	Rennes	2–2	Valenciennes FC	Rennes
20:00	Kadir 7', 50'; M'Bengue (yellow card) 64'	Summary	Le Tallec 65' da Silva 73'	Stadium: Stade de la Route de Lorient; Attendance: 16,855; Referee: (France) Sebastien Desiage

26 October 2013 Match 11	Valenciennes FC	0–1	Evian	Valenciennes
20:00	Bahebeck (yellow card) 71'	Summary	Cambon (yellow card) 78'; Sougou 82' (yellow card) 90+2'; Ehret (yellow card) 85'	Stadium: Stade du Hainaut; Attendance: 13,370; Referee: (France) Fredy Fautrel

2 November 2013 Match 12	AC Ajaccio	1–3	Valenciennes FC	Ajaccio
20:00	Mater 32' (o.g.); Tallo (yellow card) 37'; Crescenzi (yellow card) 83'	Summary	Ducourtioux (yellow card) 15'; Melikson (yellow card) 16'; Pujol 26', 90+3'; Dossevi 67'	Stadium: Stade François Coty; Attendance: 5,789; Referee: (France) Said Ennjimi

9 November 2013 Match 13	Valenciennes FC	1–1	Montpellier	Valenciennes
20:00	Angoua 6'; Melikson (yellow card) 28'; Ciss (yellow card) 54' da Silva (yellow card) 84'	Summary	Camara (yellow card) 44'; Saihi (yellow card) 45+1'; Montaño (yellow card) 58'; Deplagne (red card) 74'; Stambouli 90+1'; Mounier (yellow card) 90+3'	Stadium: Stade du Hainaut; Attendance: 12,521; Referee: (France) Alexandre Castro

23 November 2013 Match 14	Lyon	1–1	Valenciennes FC	Lyon
20:00	Gomis 17'; Biševac (yellow card) 26'	Summary	Néry (yellow card) 21'; Masuaku (yellow card) 57'; Bahebeck 66'; Ducourtioux (yellow card) 69'	Stadium: Stade de Gerland; Attendance: 33,202; Referee: (France) Amaury Delerue

30 November 2013 Match 15	Valenciennes FC	0–1	Lille	Valenciennes
20:00	Masuaku (yellow card) 41'; Melikson (yellow card) 80'	Summary	Béria (yellow card) 38' (yellow-red card); Rodelin 47'	Stadium: Stade du Hainaut; Attendance: 14,874; Referee: (France) Bartolomeu Varela

3 December 2013 Match 16	Nantes	2–1	Valenciennes FC	Nantes
19:00	Nicoliță (yellow card) 34'; Bedoya 59'; Aristeguieta 89'	Summary	Saez 52'	Stadium: Stade de la Beaujoire; Attendance: 20,638; Referee: (France) Ruddy Buquet

7 December 2013 Match 17	Valenciennes FC	1–1	Guingamp	Valenciennes
20:00	Doumbia 18'; Massampu (yellow card) 87'	Summary	Kerbrat (yellow card) 63'; Lemaître (yellow card) 67'; Sankharé 70'	Stadium: Stade du Hainaut; Attendance: 15,655; Referee: (France) Philippe Kalt

15 December 2013 Match 18	Bordeaux	2–1	Valenciennes FC	Bordeaux
14:00	Jussiê 58' (pen.); Henrique (yellow card) 65'; Maurice-Belay 73'	Summary	Bahebeck (yellow card) 27'; Doumbia 55'; Penneteau (yellow card) 66'	Stadium: Stade Chaban-Delmas; Attendance: 22,165; Referee: (France) Mikael Lesage

20 December 2013 Match 19	AS Monaco	1–2	Valenciennes FC	Fontvieille, Monaco
20:30	Abidal (yellow card) 72'; Rodríguez 84'	Summary	Masuaku (yellow card) 15'; Abidal 30' (o.g.); Ciss (yellow card) 53'; Ducourtioux 58'; Mater (yellow card) 68'; Kagelmacher (yellow card) 81'; Saez (yellow card) 86'	Stadium: Stade Louis II; Attendance: 6,299; Referee: (France) Olivier Thual

11 January 2014 Match 20	Valenciennes FC	3–2	Bastia	Valenciennes
20:00	Dossevi 33', 35'; Waris 54'	Summary	Romaric 71'; Ilan 83'	Stadium: Stade du Hainaut; Attendance: 13,349; Referee: (France) Clement Turpin

18 January 2014 Match 21	Marseille	–	Valenciennes FC	Marseille
17:00				Stadium: Stade Vélodrome

25 January 2014 Match 22	Valenciennes FC	1–1	FC Lorient	Valenciennes
20:00	Pujol 52'; Eloge Enza Yamissi (yellow card) 61'	Summary	Ciss 39' (o.g.); Jouffre (yellow card) 90'	Stadium: Stade du Hainaut; Attendance: 11,816; Referee: (France) Stephane Jochem

29 January 2014 Match 21	Marseille	2–1	Valenciennes FC	Marseille
19:00	Gignac 31'; Thauvin 63'	Summary	Masuaku 37'; Ciss (yellow card) 81'; Ducourtioux (yellow card) 90+2'	Stadium: Stade Vélodrome; Attendance: 35,741; Referee: (France) Bartolomeu Varela

1 February 2014 Match 23	Saint-Étienne	3–0	Valenciennes FC	Saint-Étienne
20:00	Hamouma (yellow card) 40'; Cohade 45+1'; Corgnet 45+1'; Mollo 87'	Summary	Ducourtioux (yellow card) 8'; Eloge Enza Yamissi (yellow card) 25' da Silva (yellow card) 54'	Stadium: Stade Geoffroy-Guichard; Attendance: 19,839; Referee: (France) Lionel Jaffredo

8 February 2014 Match 24	Valenciennes FC	2–1	OGC Nice	Valenciennes
20:00	Doumbia 26'; Mater (yellow card) 37'; Waris 88' (yellow card) 88'	Summary	Mendy (yellow card) 48'; Genevois (yellow card) 57'; Brüls (yellow card) 68'; Maupay 75'	Stadium: Stade du Hainaut; Attendance: 12,186; Referee: (France) Ruddy Buquet

14 February 2014 Match 25	Paris Saint-Germain	3–0	Valenciennes FC	Paris
20:30	Lavezzi 18'; Ibrahimović 50'; Kagelmacher 52' (o.g.); Thiago Silva (yellow card) 67'	Summary		Stadium: Parc des Princes; Attendance: 45,727; Referee: (France) Sebastien Desiage

22 February 2014 Match 26	Valenciennes FC	2–2	Sochaux	Valenciennes
20:00	Waris 51' (pen.) 86'; Ducourtioux (yellow card) 76'; Enza Yamissi (yellow card) 78'	Summary	Mickael Malsa (yellow card) 45+1'; Zouma (yellow card) 50'; Corchia 54'; Marange 89'; Bakambu (yellow card) 90+2'	Stadium: Stade du Hainaut; Attendance: 13,340; Referee: (France) Fredy Fautrel

1 March 2014 Match 27	Stade Reims	3–1	Valenciennes FC	Reims
20:00	de Préville 21'; Oniangue 38'; Tacalfred (yellow card) 56'; Charbonnier 77'	Summary	Waris (yellow card) 79'; Placide 87' (o.g.)	Stadium: Stade Auguste Delaune; Attendance: 14,414; Referee: (France) Said Ennjimi

8 March 2014 Match 28	Valenciennes FC	2–1	Rennes	Valenciennes
20:00	Dossevi 54'; Néry (yellow card) 58'; Waris 77'; Mater (yellow card) 90+3'	Summary	Toivonen 49' (yellow card) 85'; Danzé (yellow card) 50'; M'Bengue (yellow card) 61'; Kana-Biyik (red card) 75'; Grosicki (yellow card) 90+3'	Stadium: Stade du Hainaut; Attendance: 13,409; Referee: (France) Wilfried Bien

15 March 2014 Match 29	Evian	0–1	Valenciennes FC	Annecy
20:00	Barbosa (yellow card) 64'; Ruben (yellow card) 88'	Summary	Waris 63'	Stadium: Parc des Sports, Annecy; Attendance: 11,172; Referee: (France) Olivier Thual

22 March 2014 Match 30	Valenciennes FC	2–3	AC Ajaccio	Valenciennes
20:00	Waris 51' 72' (pen.)	Summary	Mickael Leca (yellow card) 41'; Camara (yellow card) 43'; André 62'; Nadeau (yellow card) 71'; Issa Baradiji 87', 90'	Stadium: Stade du Hainaut; Attendance: 14,203; Referee: (France) Amaury Delerue

29 March 2014 Match 31	Montpellier	0–0	Valenciennes FC	Montpellier
20:00	Deplagne (yellow card) 45'	Summary	Ciss (yellow card) 28'; Doumbia (yellow card) 71'; Macedo Novaes (yellow card) 85'	Stadium: Stade de la Mosson; Attendance: 17,109; Referee: (France) Philippe Kalt

6 April 2014 Match 32	Valenciennes FC	1–2	Lyon	Valenciennes
17:00	Lala (yellow card) 24'; Ducourtioux (yellow card) 50'; Waris 66' da Silva (yellow card) 74' (red card) 84'; Doumbia (yellow card) 90+3'	Summary	Ferri (yellow card) 26' (goal) 69'; Gomis 30'; Vercoutre (yellow card) 81' (yellow-red card); Danic (yellow card) 85'	Stadium: Stade du Hainaut; Attendance: 13,922; Referee: (France) Nicolas Rainville

12 April 2014 Match 33	Lille	1–0	Valenciennes FC	Lille
17:00	Origi 70'	Summary	Mater (yellow card) 11'; Ducourtioux (yellow card) 12'; Enza Yamissi (yellow card) 78'	Stadium: Stade Pierre-Mauroy; Attendance: 37,757; Referee: (France) Said Ennjimi

20 April 2014 Match 34	Valenciennes FC	2–6	Nantes	Valenciennes
17:00	Medjani (yellow card) 53' (goal) 79'; Bahebeck 83'	Summary	Audel 24'; Bedoya 41'; Gakpé 44', 54'; Medjani 85' (o.g.); Nicoliță 89'	Stadium: Stade du Hainaut; Attendance: 13,972; Referee: (France) Alexandre Castro

26 April 2014 Match 35	Guingamp	1–0	Valenciennes FC	Guingamp
20:00	Martins Pereira (yellow card) 46'; Beauvue 61'	Summary		Stadium: Stade du Roudourou; Attendance: 16,712; Referee: (France) Ruddy Buquet

4 May 2014 Match 36	Valenciennes FC	0–1	Bordeaux	Valenciennes
17:00	Enza Yamissi (yellow card) 51'; Pujol (yellow card) 76'	Summary	Poko (yellow card) 5'; Faubert 74'	Stadium: Stade du Hainaut; Attendance: 12,784; Referee: (France) Stephane Jochem

10 May 2014 Match 37	Valenciennes FC	1–2	AS Monaco	Valenciennes
21:00	Rose (yellow card) 48'; Doumbia 70'	Summary	Germain 40'; Abdennour (yellow card) 73'; Echiéjilé (yellow card) 76'; Dirar 87'	Stadium: Stade du Hainaut; Attendance: 13,006; Referee: (France) Bartolomeu Varela

17 May 2014 Match 38	Toulouse	3–1	Valenciennes FC	Toulouse
21:00	Yago (yellow card) 9'; Ben Yedder 30' 45' (pen.) 90+1'	Summary	Mater (yellow card) 33'; Ducourtioux (yellow card) 42'; Le Tallec 87'	Stadium: Stadium Municipal; Attendance: 20,183; Referee: (France) Alexandre Castro

=== Coupe de France ===
4 January 2014 Round of 64	Rennes	1–1 (a.e.t.) (8–7 p)	Valenciennes	Rennes
20:45	Féret 61' (pen.); Armand (yellow card) 110'	Summary	da Silva (yellow card) 60'; Dossevi 74'	Stadium: Stade de la Route de Lorient; Attendance: 8,346; Referee: (France) Benoit Bastien

=== Coupe de la Ligue ===
29 October 2012 Third round	Valenciennes	1–3	Troyes	Valenciennes
20:00	Dossevi 47'; Saez (yellow card) 56'; Ciss (yellow card) 84'	Summary	Yoann Court 4'; Gimbert 31', 57'	Stadium: Stade du Hainaut; Attendance: 7,229; Referee: (France) Benoit Bastien
