= 2013–14 AS Saint-Étienne season =

Saint-Étienne
2013–14 season
- Chairman: Bernard Caiazzo; Roland Romeyer
- Manager: Christophe Galtier
- Stadium: Stade Geoffroy-Guichard
- Ligue 1: 4th
- Coupe de France: Round of 64
- Coupe de la Ligue: Round of 16
- UEFA Europa League: Play-off round
- Top goalscorer: League: Mevlüt Erdinç (11); All: Mevlüt Erdinç (12)
Home colours	Away colours

The 2013–14 AS Saint-Étienne season was the 81st professional season of the club since its creation in 1933.

== Players ==
=== First-team squad ===
As of 8 January 2013

Note: Flags indicate national team as defined under FIFA eligibility rules; some limited exceptions apply. Players may hold more than one non-FIFA nationality.

No.	Pos.	Nation	Player
4	DF	FRA	Kurt Zouma
6	MF	FRA	Jérémy Clément
9	FW	CIV	Max Gradel
10	MF	FRA	Renaud Cohade
11	MF	FRA	Yohan Mollo (on loan from Nancy)
12	DF	FRA	Jean-Pascal Mignot
13	DF	ALG	Faouzi Ghoulam
14	FW	BRA	Brandão
15	FW	DEN	Andreas Laudrup (on loan from FC Nordsjælland)
16	GK	FRA	Stéphane Ruffier
17	FW	FRA	Kévin Mayi
18	MF	FRA	Fabien Lemoine

No.	Pos.	Nation	Player
19	MF	FRA	Josuha Guilavogui
20	DF	FRA	Jonathan Brison
21	MF	FRA	Romain Hamouma
22	FW	SRB	Danijel Aleksić
24	DF	FRA	Loïc Perrin (captain)
25	MF	ROU	Bănel Nicoliță
26	DF	SEN	Moustapha Bayal
27	MF	FRA	Mathieu Bodmer
28	MF	CIV	Ismaël Diomande
29	DF	FRA	François Clerc
30	GK	FRA	Jessy Moulin
40	GK	SEN	Pape Coulibaly

=== Out on loan ===
Note: Flags indicate national team as defined under FIFA eligibility rules; some limited exceptions apply. Players may hold more than one non-FIFA nationality.

No.	Pos.	Nation	Player
—	DF	SEN	Guirane N'Daw (at Ipswich Town)
—	DF	GUI	Florentin Pogba (at Sedan)
—	MF	FRA	Yoric Ravet (at Angers)

No.	Pos.	Nation	Player
—	FW	FRA	Lynel Kitambala (at Dynamo Dresden)
—	FW	FRA	Idriss Saadi (at Gazélec Ajaccio)

=== Reserves ===
As of 2 August 2012

Note: Flags indicate national team as defined under FIFA eligibility rules; some limited exceptions apply. Players may hold more than one non-FIFA nationality.

No.	Pos.	Nation	Player
—	GK	FRA	Louis Beccu
—	GK	BFA	Germain Sanou
—	GK	FRA	Jérémy Vachoux
—	DF	FRA	Ruben Aguilar
—	DF	FRA	Thibault Balp
—	DF	FRA	Maxence Chapuis
—	DF	FRA	Aymeric Djeridi
—	DF	CMR	Guy Ritchy Pellet
—	DF	FRA	Pierre-Yves Polomat
—	DF	FRA	Romain Russier
—	MF	FRA	Zaven Bulut

No.	Pos.	Nation	Player
—	MF	NOR	Eirik Birkelund
—	MF	FRA	Kamel Chergui
—	MF	FRA	Sofian Elmoudane
—	MF	FRA	Yohan Garric
—	MF	FRA	Billal Sebaihi
—	FW	GAM	Ebrima Bojang
—	FW	GUI	Ibrahima Diaouara
—	FW	FRA	Jessim Mahaya
—	FW	FRA	Elian Tack

== Competitions ==
=== Overview ===
Competition	First match	Last match	Starting round	Final position	Record							
Competition	First match	Last match	Starting round	Final position	Pld	W	D	L	GF	GA	GD	Win %
Ligue 1	11 August 2013	17 May 2014	Matchday 1	5th	38	20	9	9	56	34	+22	52.63
Coupe de France	14 January 2014		Round of 64	Round of 64	1	0	1	0	1	1	+0	0.00
Coupe de la Ligue	18 December 2013		Round of 16	Round of 16	1	0	0	1	1	2	−1	0.00
Total					40	20	10	10	58	37	+21	50.00

Source: Soccerway

=== Ligue 1 ===
==== League table ====
Pos	Team	Pld	W	D	L	GF	GA	GD	Pts	Qualification or relegation
2	Monaco (Note: Monaco were deducted 2 points due to poor fan behavior in a match last season. However this was overturned on 13 August 2013.)	38	23	11	4	63	31	+32	80	Qualification for the Champions League group stage (Note: Paris Saint-Germain qualified for the Europa League third qualifying round by winning the 2013–14 Coupe de la Ligue. However, since they already qualified for European competition based on their league position, the spots awarded to the cup winners were passed down the league.)
3	Lille	38	20	11	7	46	26	+20	71	Qualification for the Champions League third qualifying round
4	Saint-Étienne	38	20	9	9	56	34	+22	69	Qualification for the Europa League play-off round
5	Lyon	38	17	10	11	56	44	+12	61	Qualification for the Europa League third qualifying round
6	Marseille	38	16	12	10	53	40	+13	60	

Source: Ligue 1
Rules for classification: 1) Points; 2) Goal difference; 3) Number of goals scored

==== Results summary ====
Overall								Home						Away					
Pld	W	D	L	GF	GA	GD	Pts	W	D	L	GF	GA	GD	W	D	L	GF	GA	GD
38	20	9	9	56	34	+22	69	12	5	2	36	15	+21	8	4	7	20	19	+1

Source: Ligue 1

==== Results by round ====
Round	1	2	3	4	5	6	7	8	9	10	11	12	13	14	15	16	17	18	19	20	21	22	23	24	25	26	27	28	29	30	31	32	33	34	35	36	37	38
Ground	A	H	A	H	A	H	A	H	A	H	H	A	H	A	H	A	H	A	H	A	H	A	H	A	H	A	H	A	A	H	A	H	A	H	A	H	A	H
Result	W	W	L	W	W	L	L	D	L	W	D	D	L	W	W	L	W	W	W	D	W	L	W	D	D	W	W	L	L	W	W	D	D	D	W	W	W	W
Position	7	4	7	3	2	3	6	7	7	7	7	7	9	6	5	6	6	4	4	4	4	4	4	4	4	4	4	4	4	4	4	4	4	4	4	4	4	4

Source: Ligue 1
A = Away; H = Home; W = Win; D = Draw; L = Loss

==== Matches ====
Win Draw Loss

11 August 2013 1	Ajaccio	0–1	Saint-Étienne	Ajaccio
17:00 CEST (UTC+02:00)		Report		Stadium: Stade François Coty

17 August 2013 2	Saint-Étienne	1–0	Guingamp	Saint-Étienne
20:00 CEST (UTC+02:00)		Report		Stadium: Stade Geoffroy-Guichard

25 August 2013 3	Lille	1–0	Saint-Étienne	Villeneuve-d'Ascq
14:00 CEST (UTC+02:00)		Report		Stadium: Stade Pierre-Mauroy

1 September 2013 4	Saint-Étienne	2–1	Bordeaux	Saint-Étienne
14:00 CEST (UTC+02:00)		Report		Stadium: Stade Geoffroy-Guichard

14 September 2013 5	Valenciennes	1–3	Saint-Étienne	Valenciennes
20:00 CEST (UTC+02:00)		Report		Stadium: Stade du Hainaut

20 September 2013 6	Saint-Étienne	1–2	Toulouse	Saint-Étienne
20:30 CEST (UTC+02:00)		Report		Stadium: Stade Geoffroy-Guichard

24 September 2013 7	Marseille	2–1	Saint-Étienne	Marseille
21:00 CEST (UTC+02:00)		Report		Stadium: Stade Vélodrome

28 September 2013 8	Saint-Étienne	2–2	Bastia	Saint-Étienne
20:00 CEST (UTC+02:00)		Report		Stadium: Stade Geoffroy-Guichard

5 October 2013 9	Monaco	2–1	Saint-Étienne	Monaco
17:00 CEST (UTC+02:00)		Report		Stadium: Stade Louis II

20 October 2013 10	Saint-Étienne	3–2	Lorient	Saint-Étienne
17:00 CEST (UTC+02:00)		Report		Stadium: Stade Geoffroy-Guichard

27 October 2013 11	Saint-Étienne	2–2	Paris Saint-Germain	Saint-Étienne
21:00 CET (UTC+01:00)		Report		Stadium: Stade Geoffroy-Guichard

2 November 2013 12	Sochaux	0–0	Saint-Étienne	Montbéliard
20:00 CET (UTC+01:00)		Report		Stadium: Stade Auguste Bonal

10 November 2013 13	Saint-Étienne	1–2	Lyon	Saint-Étienne
21:00 CET (UTC+01:00)		Report		Stadium: Stade Geoffroy-Guichard

24 November 2013 14	Nice	0–1	Saint-Étienne	Nice
17:00 CET (UTC+01:00)		Report		Stadium: Allianz Riviera

30 November 2013 15	Saint-Étienne	4–0	Reims	Saint-Étienne
15:00 CET (UTC+01:00)		Report		Stadium: Stade Geoffroy-Guichard

4 December 2013 16	Rennes	3–1	Saint-Étienne	Rennes
19:00 CET (UTC+01:00)		Report		Stadium: Stade de la Route de Lorient

13 December 2013 18	Montpellier	0–1	Saint-Étienne	Montpellier
20:30 CET (UTC+01:00)		Report		Stadium: Stade de la Mosson

21 December 2013 19	Saint-Étienne	2–0	Nantes	Saint-Étienne
17:00 CET (UTC+01:00)		Report		Stadium: Stade Geoffroy-Guichard

8 January 2014 17	Saint-Étienne	1–0	Evian	Saint-Étienne
20:45 CET (UTC+01:00)		Report		Stadium: Stade Geoffroy-Guichard

11 January 2014 20	Guingamp	0–0	Saint-Étienne	Guingamp
20:00 CET (UTC+01:00)		Report		Stadium: Stade du Roudourou

17 January 2014 21	Saint-Étienne	2–0	Lille	Saint-Étienne
20:30 CET (UTC+01:00)		Report		Stadium: Stade Geoffroy-Guichard

26 January 2014 22	Bordeaux	2–0	Saint-Étienne	Bordeaux
17:00 CET (UTC+01:00)		Report		Stadium: Stade Chaban-Delmas

1 February 2014 23	Saint-Étienne	3–0	Valenciennes	Saint-Étienne
20:00 CET (UTC+01:00)		Report		Stadium: Stade Geoffroy-Guichard

7 February 2014 24	Toulouse	0–0	Saint-Étienne	Toulouse
20:30 CET (UTC+01:00)		Report		Stadium: Stadium Municipal

16 February 2014 25	Saint-Étienne	1–1	Marseille	Saint-Étienne
21:00 CET (UTC+01:00)		Report		Stadium: Stade Geoffroy-Guichard

22 February 2014 26	Bastia	0–2	Saint-Étienne	Bastia
20:00 CET (UTC+01:00)		Report		Stadium: Stade Armand Cesari

1 March 2014 27	Saint-Étienne	2–0	Monaco	Saint-Étienne
17:00 CET (UTC+01:00)		Report		Stadium: Stade Geoffroy-Guichard

9 March 2014 28	Lorient	1–0	Saint-Étienne	Lorient
17:00 CET (UTC+01:00)		Report		Stadium: Stade du Moustoir

16 March 2014 29	Paris Saint-Germain	2–0	Saint-Étienne	Paris
21:00 CET (UTC+01:00)		Report		Stadium: Parc des Princes

23 March 2014 30	Saint-Étienne	3–1	Sochaux	Saint-Étienne
14:00 CET (UTC+01:00)		Report		Stadium: Stade Geoffroy-Guichard

30 March 2014 31	Lyon	1–2	Saint-Étienne	Lyon
21:00 CEST (UTC+02:00)		Report		Stadium: Stade de Gerland

6 April 2014 32	Saint-Étienne	1–1	Nice	Saint-Étienne
14:00 CEST (UTC+02:00)		Report		Stadium: Stade Geoffroy-Guichard

13 April 2014 33	Reims	2–2	Saint-Étienne	Reims
17:00 CEST (UTC+02:00)		Report		Stadium: Stade Auguste Delaune

18 April 2014 34	Saint-Étienne	0–0	Rennes	Saint-Étienne
20:30 CEST (UTC+02:00)		Report		Stadium: Stade Geoffroy-Guichard

26 April 2014 35	Evian	1–2	Saint-Étienne	Annecy
20:00 CEST (UTC+02:00)		Report		Stadium: Parc des Sports

4 May 2014 36	Saint-Étienne	2–0	Montpellier	Saint-Étienne
14:00 CEST (UTC+02:00)		Report		Stadium: Stade Geoffroy-Guichard

10 May 2014 37	Nantes	1–3	Saint-Étienne	Nantes
21:00 CEST (UTC+02:00)		Report		Stadium: Stade de la Beaujoire

17 May 2014 38	Saint-Étienne	3–1	Ajaccio	Saint-Étienne
21:00 CEST (UTC+02:00)		Report		Stadium: Stade Geoffroy-Guichard

=== Coupe de France ===
14 January 2014 Round of 64	Cannes	1–1 (a.e.t.) (4–3 p)	Saint-Étienne	Cannes
18:30 CET (UTC+01:00)	Darnet 69'		Brandão 20'	Stadium: Stade Pierre-de-Coubertin; Attendance: 10,000; Referee: Nicolas Rainville
	Penalties
	Gauthier (penalty missed); Zobiri (penalty scored); Chmielinski (penalty scored); Cériélo (penalty missed); Lenzini (penalty scored); Rouabah (penalty scored)		(penalty missed) Cohade; (penalty scored) Pogba; (penalty scored) Ghoulam; (penalty scored) Gradel; (penalty missed) Lemoine; (penalty missed) Erdinç

=== Coupe de la Ligue ===
18 December 2013 Round of 16	Paris Saint-Germain	2–1 (a.e.t.)	Saint-Étienne	Paris
21:00 CET (UTC+01:00)	Cavani 25', 119'		Erdinç 78'	Stadium: Parc des Princes; Attendance: 45,608; Referee: Laurent Duhamel
