= Philippon =

Philippon is a French surname. Notable people with the surname include:

- Antoine Philippon (born 1989), French footballer
- Louis Philipon de La Madelaine, (1734–1818), French writer
- Armand Philippon (1761–1836), French general
- Charles Philipon (1800–1861),
- Thomas Philippon, (born 1974), French economist
- Antoine Philippon (born 1989), French footballer
- Philippe Basiron (1449-1491), French composer sometimes called Philippon
