= Eloge =

Eloge is a name. Notable people with the name include:

- Eloge Enza Yamissi (born 1983), Central African footballer
- Yao Eloge Koffi (born 1996), Ivorian footballer

Eloge can also be an alternate spelling for:

- Elegy
- Eulogy
