= Mangué Camara =

Guinean footballer

Personal information
- Date of birth: 15 September 1982 (age 44)
- Place of birth: Macenta, Guinea
- Height: 1.80 m (5 ft 11 in)
- Position: Midfielder

Team information
- Current team: FC Rouen

Senior career*
Years	Team	Apps	(Gls)
2002–2003	AS Kaloum Star		
2004–2010	FC Rouen	168	(6)
2010–	AS Moulins	116	(7)

International career^{‡}
2003–	Guinea	7	(0)
- * Club domestic league appearances and goals as of 3:07, 24 August 2015 (UTC) ‡ National team caps and goals as of 3:07, 24 August 2015 (UTC)

Mangué Camara (born 15 September 1982 in Macenta) is a Guinean football player who plays for AS Moulins.

He was part of the Guinean 2004 African Nations Cup team, who finished second in their group in the first round of competition, before losing in the quarter-finals to Mali.

Camara helped AS Moulins reach the quarter-finals of the 2013–14 Coupe de France, but missed out on the historic match through a foot injury sustained in the previous round.
