= Sébastien Da Silva =

French association footballer (born 1991)

Personal information
- Date of birth: 8 April 1991 (age 35)
- Place of birth: Orange, France
- Height: 1.85 m (6 ft 1 in)
- Position: Forward

Team information
- Current team: Furiani-Agliani
- Number: 20

Youth career
- 2000–2001: FC Souvigny
- 2001–2009: Moulins

Senior career*
Years	Team	Apps	(Gls)
2009–2014	Moulins	90	(25)
2014	Moulins II	1	(0)
2014–2015	Mulhouse	22	(4)
2015–2018	Rodez	78	(23)
2018–2020	Fréjus Saint-Raphaël	38	(16)
2020–2021	Bastia	35	(12)
2021–2023	Laval	41	(2)
2023–2024	Borgo	25	(14)
2024–	Furiani-Agliani	7	(2)
- * Club domestic league appearances and goals as of 29 November 2024

Sébastien Da Silva (born 8 April 1991) is a French professional footballer who plays as a forward for Championnat National 1 club Furiani-Agliani.

== Career ==
Da Silva began playing football with FC Souvigny and moved to the academy of Moulins at the age of 10, and began his senior career with the club in 2009. He had a stint with Mulhouse for the 2014–15 season, before moving to Rodez for three years. He followed that up with a spell at Fréjus Saint-Raphaël. He spent the 2020–21 season with Bastia, and helped them win the 2020–21 Championnat National and achieve promotion. He was controversially left out of the Bastia side after their promotion, and he transferred to Laval on in the summer of 2021. He then helped Laval win the 2021–22 Championnat National, and again achieved promotion to the Ligue 2. He made his professional debut against his old club Bastia in a 2–0 Ligue 2 win on 30 July 2022, coming on as a substitute in extra time.

== Personal life ==
Da Silva was born in France and is of Portuguese and Vietnamese descent. His best friend is the French footballer Jason Berthomier.

== Honours ==
Bastia

- Championnat National: 2020–21

Laval

- Championnat National: 2021–22
