= Josuha Guilavogui =

French footballer (born 1990)

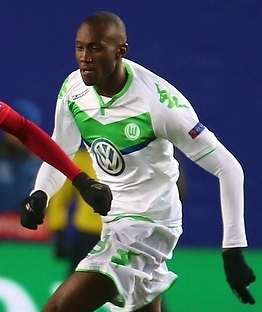
- Guilavogui playing for VfL Wolfsburg in 2015

Personal information
- Full name: Josuha Jérémy Akoi Fara Guilavogui
- Date of birth: 19 September 1990 (age 36)
- Place of birth: Ollioules, France
- Height: 1.87 m (6 ft 2 in)
- Position: Defensive midfielder

Youth career
- 1997–2000: La Marine Toulon
- 2000–2005: Toulon
- 2005–2009: Saint-Étienne

Senior career*
Years	Team	Apps	(Gls)
2009–2013	Saint-Étienne B	4	(0)
2009–2013	Saint-Étienne	96	(6)
2013–2016	Atlético Madrid	1	(0)
2014	→ Saint-Étienne (loan)	7	(0)
2014–2016	→ VfL Wolfsburg (loan)	57	(3)
2016–2023	VfL Wolfsburg	150	(6)
2022	→ Bordeaux (loan)	15	(1)
2023–2024	Mainz 05	11	(0)
2024–2025	Leeds United	16	(0)
Total		357	(16)

International career
2011–2012	France U21	15	(3)
2013–2015	France	7	(0)
- * Club domestic league appearances and goals

Josuha Jérémy Akoi Fara Guilavogui (born 19 September 1990) is a French former professional footballer who played as a defensive midfielder.

== Early life ==
Guilavogui was born in Ollioules, Var, France, to Guinean parents.

== Club career ==
=== Saint-Étienne ===
Guilavogui played for Saint-Étienne from 2005 after joining the Rhône-Alpes-based club from his local club Toulon. He was promoted to the senior squad following the firing of Laurent Roussey and the hiring of new manager Christophe Galtier, who was looking to reshuffle Saint-Étienne's defence and fill the squad, which was hit with injuries.

Guilavogui made his professional debut on 3 January 2009 coming on as a late substitute in Saint-Étienne's 1–0 victory over Bordeaux in the Coupe de France.

=== Atlético Madrid ===
On 2 September 2013, it was reported that Guilavogui had passed a medical with La Liga outfit Atlético Madrid and signed a five-year contract in a deal worth €10 million.

On 31 January 2014 Guilavogui was loaned back to Ligue 1 side Saint-Étienne until the end of the season.

=== VfL Wolfsburg ===
On 8 August 2014, Bundesliga club VfL Wolfsburg signed Guilavogui on a two-year loan deal from Atlético Madrid with an option of a permanent transfer included in the deal. The club exercised their option to buy on 18 May 2016 and signed Guilavogui permanently on a three-year deal for a fee of €3m.

On 30 May 2015, Guilavogui came off the bench as Wolfsburg won the DFB-Pokal for the first time, defeating Borussia Dortmund 3–1 at the Olympiastadion in Berlin.

==== Loan to Bordeaux ====
On 30 January 2022, Guilavogui signed for Ligue 1 club Bordeaux on loan until the end of the season. The deal included a buy option.

=== Mainz 05 ===
On 25 September 2023, Guilavogui signed for Bundesliga club 1. FSV Mainz 05, where he made 12 appearances. He left the club at the end of the season.

=== Leeds United ===
On 23 October 2024, Guilavogui joined EFL Championship club Leeds United on a contract until the end of the 2024–25 season. He made his Leeds debut on 2 November 2024 in the 3-0 league win against Plymouth Argyle, as a second half substitute. He left the club when his contract expired at the end of the season.

Guilavogui officially announced his retirement on 23 May 2026.

== International career ==
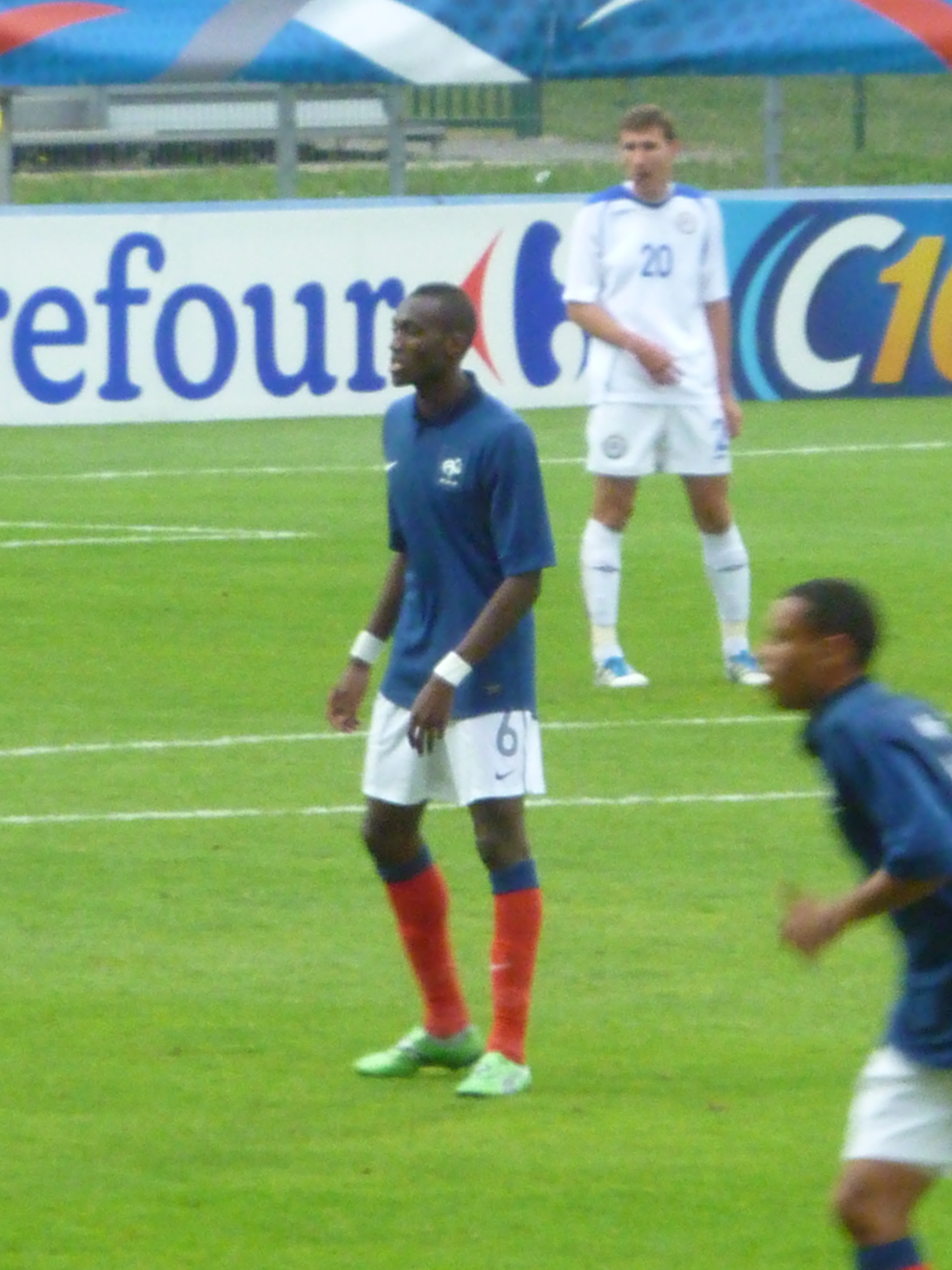
Guilavogui (centre) with the France U21 national team

Born in France, Guilavogui is of Guinean descent. He has played for the France national team.

== Personal life ==
He is the brother of the Guinean international footballer Morgan Guilavogui.

== Career statistics ==
=== Club ===
Appearances and goals by club, season and competition
Club	Season	League			National cup (Note: Includes Coupe de France, Copa del Rey, DFB-Pokal, FA Cup)		League cup (Note: Includes Coupe de la Ligue)		Europe		Other		Total	
Club	Season	Division	Apps	Goals	Apps	Goals	Apps	Goals	Apps	Goals	Apps	Goals	Apps	Goals
Saint-Étienne	2008–09	Ligue 1	0	0	1	0	0	0	0	0	—		1	0
Saint-Étienne	2009–10	Ligue 1	2	0	1	0	0	0	—		—		3	0
Saint-Étienne	2010–11	Ligue 1	22	1	0	0	2	0	—		—		24	1
Saint-Étienne	2011–12	Ligue 1	32	2	1	1	1	0	—		—		34	3
Saint-Étienne	2012–13	Ligue 1	38	3	3	2	4	0	—		—		45	5
Saint-Étienne	2013–14	Ligue 1	2	0	0	0	0	0	0	0	—		2	0
Saint-Étienne	Total		96	6	6	3	7	0	0	0	—		109	9
Saint-Étienne B	2010–11	CFA	3	0	—		—		—		—		3	0
Saint-Étienne B	2011–12	CFA	1	0	—		—		—		—		1	0
Saint-Étienne B	Total		4	0	—		—		—		—		4	0
Atlético Madrid	2013–14	La Liga	1	0	4	0	—		2 (Note: Appearances in UEFA Champions League)	0	0	0	7	0
Saint-Étienne (loan)	2013–14	Ligue 1	7	0	0	0	0	0	4 (Note: Appearances in UEFA Europa League)	0	—		11	0
VfL Wolfsburg (loan)	2014–15	Bundesliga	27	1	5	0	—		10	1	—		42	2
VfL Wolfsburg (loan)	2015–16	Bundesliga	30	2	2	0	—		9	0	1 (Note: Appearance in DFL-Supercup)	0	42	2
VfL Wolfsburg	2016–17	Bundesliga	19	0	0	0	—		—		2 (Note: Appearances in Bundesliga relegation play-offs)	0	21	0
VfL Wolfsburg	2017–18	Bundesliga	29	3	4	0	—		—		2	0	35	3
VfL Wolfsburg	2018–19	Bundesliga	19	2	1	0	—		—		—		20	2
VfL Wolfsburg	2019–20	Bundesliga	25	0	1	0	—		6	0	—		32	0
VfL Wolfsburg	2020–21	Bundesliga	20	0	3	1	—		3	1	—		26	2
VfL Wolfsburg	2021–22	Bundesliga	15	0	1	0	—		5	0	—		21	0
VfL Wolfsburg	2022–23	Bundesliga	23	1	3	0	—		—		—		26	1
VfL Wolfsburg	Wolfsburg total		207	9	20	1	—		33	2	5	0	265	12
Bordeaux (loan)	2021–22	Ligue 1	15	1	—		—		—		—		15	1
Mainz 05	2023–24	Bundesliga	11	0	1	0	—		—		—		12	0
Leeds United	2024–25	Championship	16	0	2	0	—		—		—		18	0
Career total			357	16	33	4	7	0	39	2	5	0	441	22

=== International ===
Appearances and goals by national team and year
National team	Year	Apps	Goals
France	2013	5	0
France	2014	1	0
France	2015	1	0
Total		7	0

== Honours ==
Saint-Étienne

- Coupe de la Ligue: 2012–13

VfL Wolfsburg

- DFB-Pokal: 2014–15
- DFL-Supercup: 2015

Leeds United

- EFL Championship: 2024–25
