= Arthur Masuaku =

Footballer (born 1993)

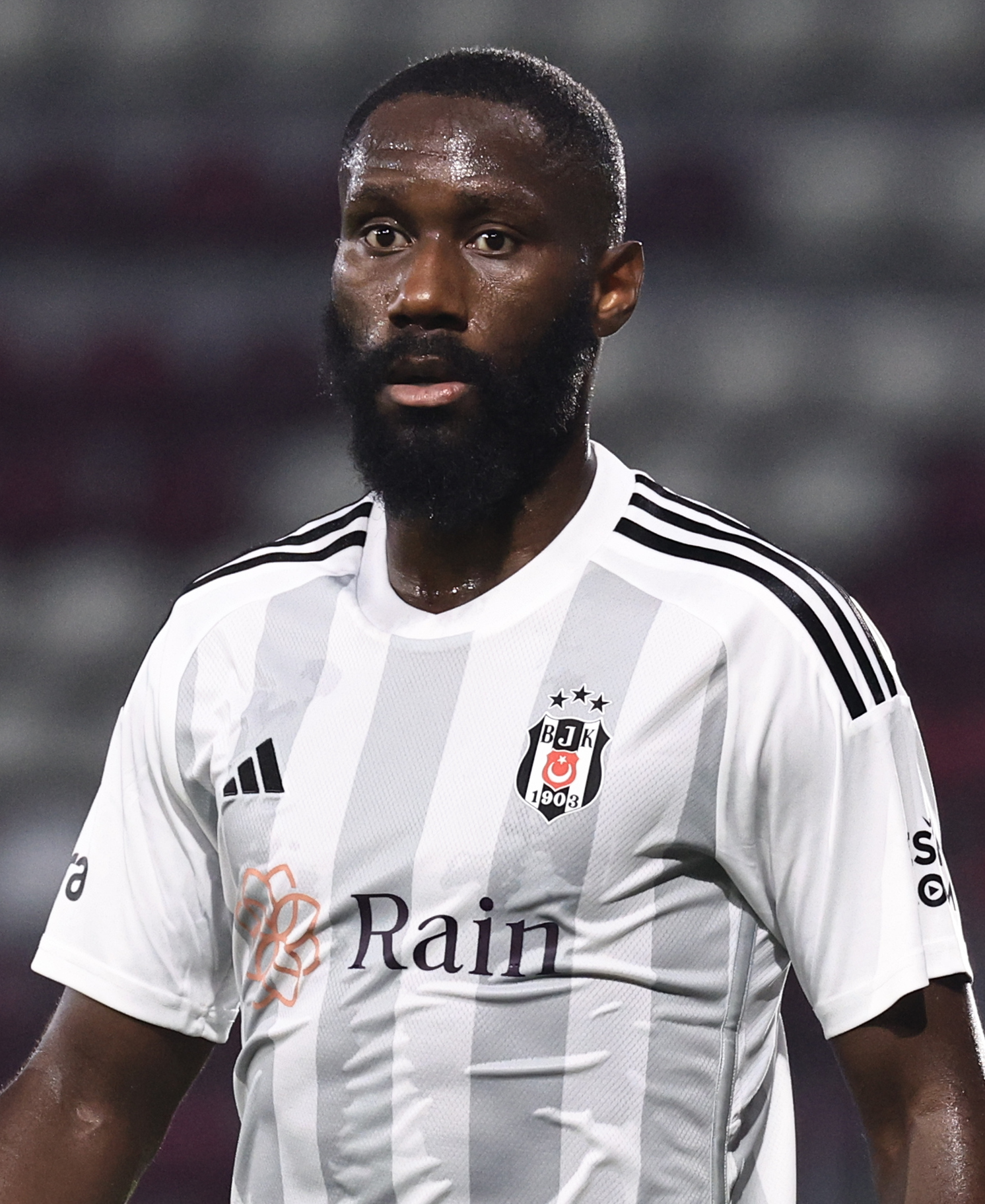
- Masuaku with Beşiktaş in 2023

Personal information
- Full name: Fuka-Arthur Masuaku Kawela
- Date of birth: 7 November 1993 (age 33)
- Place of birth: Lille, France
- Height: 1.79 m (5 ft 10 in)
- Positions: Left-back; centre-back

Team information
- Current team: Konyaspor
- Number: 26

Youth career
- 2001–2003: Lille OM.S. Fives
- 2003–2008: Lens
- 2008–2013: Valenciennes

Senior career*
Years	Team	Apps	(Gls)
2013–2014	Valenciennes	27	(1)
2014–2016	Olympiacos	51	(1)
2016–2023	West Ham United	105	(1)
2022–2023	→ Beşiktaş (loan)	31	(2)
2023–2025	Beşiktaş	51	(0)
2025–2026	Sunderland	3	(0)
2026	→ Lens (loan)	4	(0)
2026–	Konyaspor	7	(0)

International career^{‡}
2011	France U18	3	(0)
2011	France U19	2	(0)
2018–	DR Congo	49	(4)
- * Club domestic league appearances and goals as of 17 October 2026 ‡ National team caps and goals as of 20:02, 24 September 2026 (UTC)

Fuka-Arthur Masuaku Kawela (born 7 November 1993) is a professional footballer who plays as a left-back or centre-back for Süper Lig club Konyaspor. Born in France, he plays for the DR Congo national team.

Masuaku began his senior career with Valenciennes, and has also played for Olympiacos, West Ham United and Beşiktaş. He represented France at youth level before switching his allegiance to DR Congo in 2017.

== Early life ==
Masuaku was born in Lille, France, to DR Congolese parents. He acquired French nationality on 20 April 2006, through the collective effect of his mother's naturalization.

== Club career ==
=== Valenciennes ===
Masuaku came through the youth system of Valenciennes. He made his Ligue 1 debut on the opening game of the 2013–14 season on 10 August 2013 against Toulouse. He was substituted after 75 minutes for Tongo Doumbia. On 29 January 2014 Masuaku scored his first competitive goal for Valenciennes in a 2–1 away defeat against Marseille.

=== Olympiacos ===
In July 2014, Masuaku signed for Olympiacos. He made his Super League debut against Niki Volos, and in his third league match he provided two assists against OFI in a 3–0 home win. Three days later he made his debut and scored in the UEFA Champions League competition against Atlético Madrid in a 3–2 home win.

In April and May 2015, interest from Roma, Internazionale and Juventus was reported. His agent, Roger Henrotay, however stated a renewal of Masuaku's contract was on the cards. In July, a reported €4 million offer for Masuaku including former Olympiacos midfielder Giannis Fetfatzidis from Genoa was rejected by the club.

=== West Ham United ===
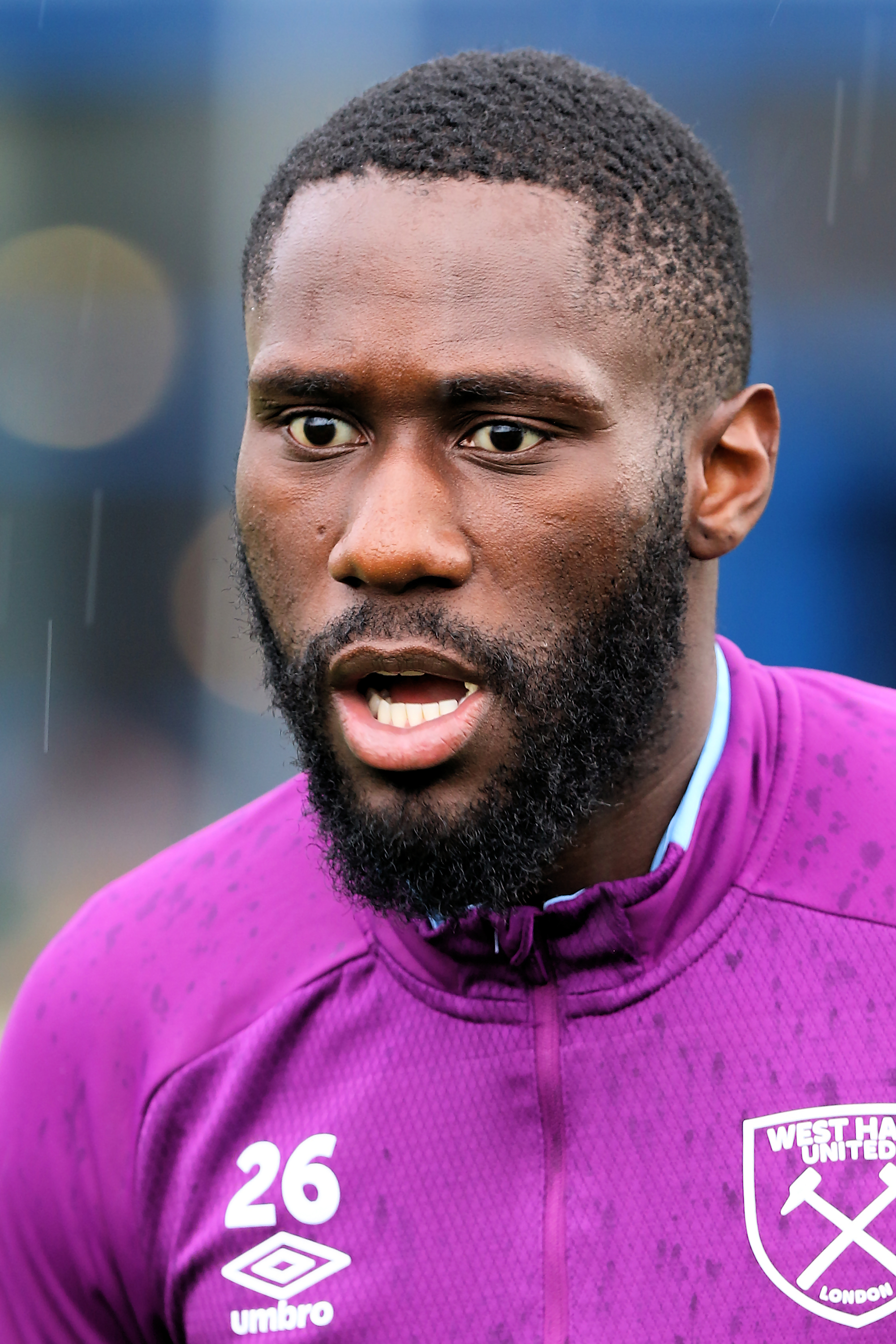
Masuaku warming up before a match in 2019

On 8 August 2016, Masuaku joined West Ham United on a four-year contract for a £6.2 million fee. He made his West Ham debut in a 2–1 away defeat to Chelsea on 15 August 2016. Masuaku admitted that he found his Premier League debut very tough due to the pace and physicality of the league. He scored his first goal for West Ham in an EFL Cup tie against Bolton Wanderers on 19 September 2017.

In the FA Cup fourth round game against Wigan Athletic on 27 January 2018, Masuaku was sent off for spitting at Wigan's Nick Powell following a challenge. It was the first sending-off of Masuaku's career. Masuaku apologised for the sending off, saying the incident was "totally unacceptable and out of character". He received a six match ban for the offence.

In July 2019, having played 75 times for West Ham, Masuaku signed a contract extension with the club until 2024 with an option to further extend the contract for two years.

On 4 December 2021, Masuaku scored the winning goal in a 3–2 victory over defending UEFA Champions League winners Chelsea. The goal, a mishit cross that caught out Chelsea goalkeeper Edouard Mendy at his near post, was his only Premier League goal.

=== Beşiktaş ===
On 2 August 2022, Masuaku joined Turkish team Beşiktaş on a season long loan with an option to buy in 2023. On 17 April 2023, Masuaku completed a permanent transfer to Beşiktaş. The fee was undisclosed by the clubs but was reported by some sources to be in the region of £2million.

On 30 June 2025, Beşiktaş announced Masuaku's departure from the club.

=== Sunderland ===
On 10 August 2025, Masuaku signed a two-year contract with Premier League club Sunderland.

On 27 January 2026, Masuaku joined Lens in Ligue 1, where he already played as a youth, on loan until the end of the 2025–26 season.

=== Konyaspor ===
On August 10, 2026, Masuaku joined Konyaspor in Turkey on a two-year deal.

== International career ==
Having represented France at under-18 and under-19 level, Masuaku switched his allegiance to DR Congo in June 2017. In August 2017, he was called into his first DR Congo squad, for two 2018 World Cup qualification games against Tunisia. In March 2018, still yet to make his international debut, Masuaku travelled with the DR Congo squad for a friendly against Tanzania. He was one of four players to drop out before the game, amidst claims of organisational problems and travel disorder, and did not appear. He made his debut on 13 October 2018, starting in a 1–2 home loss against Zimbabwe in a 2019 Africa Cup of Nations qualification game. Masuaku scored his first goal for DR Congo, a free-kick, in a 1–1 away draw with Kenya on 15 June 2019.

On 27 December 2023, Masuaku was included in the final 24-man squad for the 2023 Africa Cup of Nations. He started his nation's first match at the tournament, a 1–1 draw with Zambia on 17 January 2024. He went on to score in his nation's 3–1 victory over Guinea in the quarter-finals on 2 February 2024. It booked DR Congo a place in the semi-finals of the AFCON for the first time since 2015.

On May 19, 2026, he was included in the 26-man squad selected by head coach Sébastien Desabre to represent the DR Congo at the 2026 FIFA World Cup.

== Personal life ==
Masuaku is a practising Muslim. In June 2025, he made the Umrah pilgrimage to Mecca.

== Career statistics ==
=== Club ===
As of match played 19 September 2026

Appearances and goals by club, season and competition
Club	Season	League			National cup (Note: Includes Coupe de France, Greek Cup, FA Cup, Turkish Cup)		League cup (Note: Includes Coupe de la Ligue, EFL Cup)		Europe		Other		Total	
Club	Season	Division	Apps	Goals	Apps	Goals	Apps	Goals	Apps	Goals	Apps	Goals	Apps	Goals
Valenciennes	2012–13	Ligue 1	0	0	1	0	0	0	—		—		1	0
Valenciennes	2013–14	Ligue 1	27	1	0	0	1	0	—		—		28	1
Valenciennes	Total		27	1	1	0	1	0	—		—		29	1
Olympiacos	2014–15	Super League Greece	27	0	5	0	—		8 (Note: Six appearances and one goal in UEFA Champions League, two appearances in UEFA Europa League)	1	—		40	1
Olympiacos	2015–16	Super League Greece	24	1	2	0	—		7 (Note: Five appearances in UEFA Champions League, two appearances in UEFA Europa League)	0	—		33	1
Olympiacos	2016–17	Super League Greece	0	0	0	0	—		1 (Note: Appearance in UEFA Champions League)	0	—		1	0
Olympiacos	Total		51	1	7	0	0	0	16	1	—		74	2
West Ham United	2016–17	Premier League	13	0	0	0	2	0	0	0	—		15	0
West Ham United	2017–18	Premier League	27	0	3	0	3	1	—		—		33	1
West Ham United	2018–19	Premier League	23	0	2	0	2	0	—		—		27	0
West Ham United	2019–20	Premier League	17	0	1	0	1	0	—		—		19	0
West Ham United	2020–21	Premier League	12	0	0	0	1	0	—		—		13	0
West Ham United	2021–22	Premier League	13	1	1	0	3	0	4 (Note: Appearances in UEFA Europa League)	0	—		21	1
West Ham United	Total		105	1	7	0	12	1	4	0	—		128	2
Beşiktaş (loan)	2022–23	Süper Lig	31	2	1	0	—		—		—		32	2
Beşiktaş	2023–24	Süper Lig	18	0	4	0	—		7 (Note: Appearances in UEFA Europa Conference League)	0	—		29	0
Beşiktaş	2024–25	Süper Lig	33	0	4	0	—		9	1	1 (Note: Appearance in Turkish Super Cup)	0	47	1
Beşiktaş	Beşiktaş total		82	2	9	0	0	0	16	1	1	0	108	3
Sunderland	2025–26	Premier League	3	0	0	0	1	0	—		—		4	0
Sunderland	2026–27	Premier League	0	0	0	0	0	0	—		—		0	0
Sunderland	Total		3	0	0	0	1	0	—		—		4	0
Lens (loan)	2025–26	Ligue 1	4	0	2	0	—		—		—		6	0
Konyaspor	2026–27	Süper Lig	5	0	0	0	—		—		—		5	0
Career total			277	5	26	0	14	1	36	2	1	0	354	8

=== International ===
As of match played 24 September 2026

Appearances and goals by national team and year
National team	Year	Apps	Goals
DR Congo	2018	1	0
DR Congo	2019	7	1
DR Congo	2021	2	0
DR Congo	2022	2	0
DR Congo	2023	6	1
DR Congo	2024	13	1
DR Congo	2025	11	1
DR Congo	2026	8	0
Total		50	4

As of match played 16 December 2025. Scores and results list DR Congo's goal tally first.

List of international goals scored by Arthur Masuaku
No.	Date	Venue	Opponent	Score	Result	Competition
1	15 June 2019	Centro Deportivo Santa Ana, Madrid, Spain	Kenya	1–1	1–1	Friendly
2	24 March 2023	Japoma Stadium, Douala, Cameroon	Mauritania	3–1	3–1	2023 Africa Cup of Nations qualification
3	2 February 2024	Alassane Ouattara Stadium, Abidjan, Ivory Coast	Guinea	3–1	3–1	2023 Africa Cup of Nations
4	16 December 2025	Pinatar Arena, Murcia, Spain	Zambia	1–0	2–0	Friendly

== Honours ==
Olympiacos

- Super League Greece: 2014–15, 2015–16
- Greek Cup: 2014–15

Beşiktaş

- Turkish Cup: 2023–24
- Turkish Super Cup: 2024

RC Lens

- Coupe de France: 2025–26

Individual

- Super League Greece Team of the Season: 2014–15, 2015–16
