= Grégory Rouchon =

French footballer (born 1983)

Personal information
- Date of birth: 24 September 1983 (age 43)
- Place of birth: Saint-Germain-en-Laye, France
- Height: 1.76 m (5 ft 9 in)
- Position: Defender

Youth career
- FC St. Germain en Laye

Senior career*
Years	Team	Apps	(Gls)
2001–2003	Paris Saint-Germain B	31	(0)
2003–2004	Rouen	14	(0)
2004–2005	Toulon	27	(0)
2005–2006	Moissy Cramayel US	25	(0)
2006–2010	Pacy Vallée-d'Eure	162	(0)
2008–2011	Pacy B	1	(0)
2011–2016	Moulins	132	(2)
2016–2020	Yzeure	87	(0)
- * Club domestic league appearances and goals

Grégory Rouchon (born 24 September 1983) is a retired French professional footballer, who played as a defender.

Rouchon played at the professional level in Ligue 2 for FC Rouen.
