= Rudy Mater =

French footballer (born 1980)

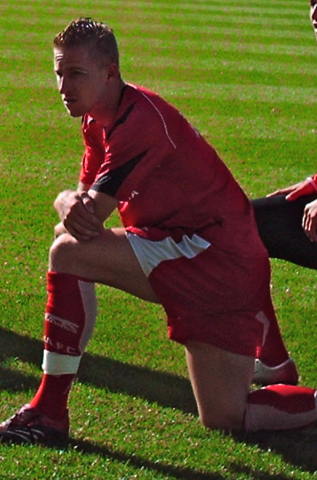

Personal information
- Date of birth: 13 October 1980 (age 46)
- Place of birth: Valenciennes, France
- Height: 1.80 m (5 ft 11 in)
- Position: Defender

Youth career
- 1996–2000: AS Cannes

Senior career*
Years	Team	Apps	(Gls)
2000–2002	AS Cannes	7	(0)
2002–2014	Valenciennes FC	366	(10)
2015	SC Feignies	0	(0)
- * Club domestic league appearances and goals

Rudy Mater (born 13 October 1980) is a French former footballer.
