= Antoine Philippon =

French footballer (born 1989)

Personal information
- Date of birth: 10 October 1989 (age 37)
- Place of birth: Moulins, France
- Height: 1.84 m (6 ft 0 in)
- Position: Goalkeeper

Senior career*
Years	Team	Apps	(Gls)
2008–2010	Moulins	28	(0)
2010–2013	Troyes	3	(0)
2012–2013	→ Créteil (loan)	10	(0)
2013–2014	CA Bastia	4	(0)
2014–2019	Villefranche	110	(0)
2019–2024	GOAL FC (Note: In 2020, Monts d'Or Azergues Foot merged with several smaller clubs to form GOAL FC.)	109	(0)
2024–2025	Concarneau	3	(0)
2025	Aviron Bayonnais	0	(0)
- * Club domestic league appearances and goals as of 26 May 2025

Antoine Philippon (born 10 October 1989) is a French professional footballer who plays as a goalkeeper.

== Career ==
On 13 June 2019, it was confirmed that Philippon had joined Monts d'Or Azergues (renamed GOAL FC in 2020).
