= Soki N'Zinga =

Angolan footballer

Personal information
- Date of birth: November 28, 1984 (age 41)
- Place of birth: Luanda, Angola
- Height: 1.73 m (5 ft 8 in)
- Position: Forward

Youth career
- ASPTT Brest
- Brest

Senior career*
Years	Team	Apps	(Gls)
2006–2007	Brest	3	(0)
2007–2008	Montluçon		
2008–2009	Concarneau		
2009–2010	Aviron Bayonnais	37	(6)
2011	Stade Plabennéc	14	(4)
2011	Martigues	15	(2)
2012–2013	Caála		
2013–2014	Concarneau	26	(2)
2014–2015	Angoulême	25	(3)
2015–2017	Vitré	49	(4)
2017–2018	Aviron Bayonnais	16	(3)
2018–2019	Muret	18	(1)
2019–2020	Balma	17	(2)
2020	Saint-Estève		
- * Club domestic league appearances and goals

Soki N'Zinga (born November 28, 1984, in Luanda) is a retired Angolan professional football player.

He played on the professional level in Ligue 2 for Stade Brestois 29.
