= Jean-François Grimaldi =

French footballer (born 1988)

Personal information
- Date of birth: 14 July 1988 (age 38)
- Place of birth: Bastia, France
- Height: 1.81 m (5 ft 11 in)
- Position: Midfielder

Team information
- Current team: Gallia Lucciana

Youth career
- Bastia

Senior career*
Years	Team	Apps	(Gls)
2007–2009	Bastia	1	(0)
2009–2010	Toulon	15	(1)
2010–2017	CA Bastia	144	(6)
2017–2021	Bastia-Borgo	75	(11)
2021–	Gallia Lucciana	54	(3)

International career
2009–2024	Corsica	9	(0)
- * Club domestic league appearances and goals as of 13 December 2024

Jean-François Grimaldi (born 14 July 1988) is a French professional footballer who plays for Gallia Lucciana in the Championnat National 3.

== Club career ==
Born in Bastia, Grimaldi started his career with his hometown club SC Bastia, at the time a Ligue 2 club. In 2009, he was called up by Bernard Casoni and made his debut in a 2–0 loss to Dijon FCO. He left the club at the end of the season, joining fourth-division club Sporting Toulon Var.

Only a year after, he returned to Bastia, this time with CA Bastia. In three years, Grimaldi helped his new club gain promotion from the fourth tier to the second level of French football.

When CA Bastia merged with Borgo FC in 2017, Grimaldi remained at the newly formed club, FC Bastia-Borgo.

== International career ==
In January 2008 he was called up for a training camp with the French under-21 futsal team for a 4-day camp.

Grimaldi, born in Corsica, is eligible to the unofficial Corsica national team and played his first game in 2009, against Congo in a 1–1 draw in Ajaccio.
