= Hervé Kambou =

Ivorian footballer

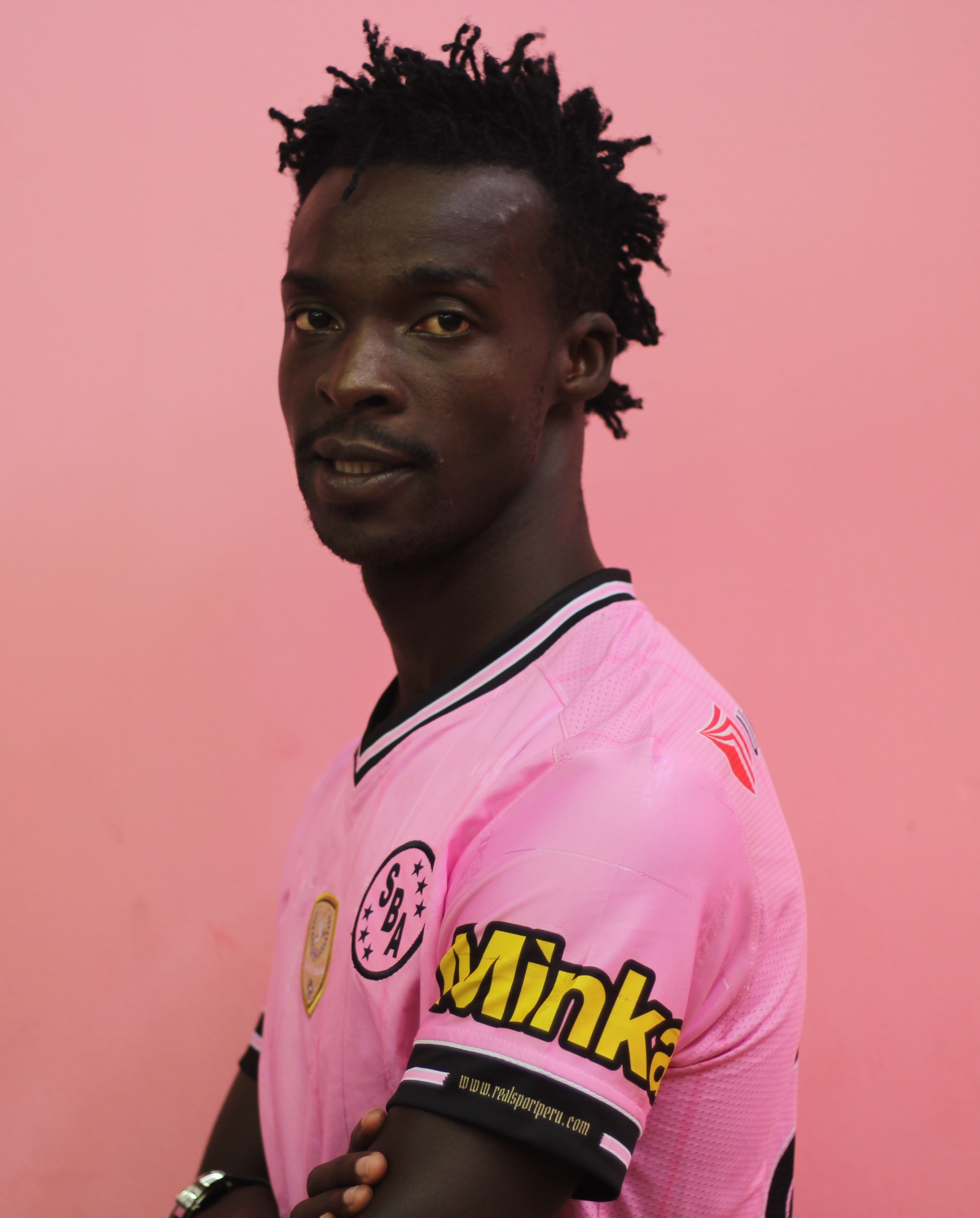
- Hervé Kambou in 2016

Personal information
- Full name: Hervé Kambou
- Date of birth: 1 May 1985 (age 41)
- Place of birth: Abidjan, Ivory Coast
- Height: 1.82 m (6 ft 0 in)
- Position: Centre-back

Team information
- Current team: ADT

Youth career
- 2001–2004: Académie de Sol Beni
- 2004–2005: Toumodi

Senior career*
Years	Team	Apps	(Gls)
2005–2007	BEC Tero Sasana	25	(0)
2008	ROCCM	8	(0)
2008–2010	Bastia	9	(0)
2010–2013	Club Africain	?	(?)
2014–2015	Willy Serrato	11	(0)
2015–2017	Sport Boys	35	(1)
2017	Zulia	20	(0)
2018	Cantolao	40	(1)
2019–2020	Binacional	27	(1)
2020	Sport Huancayo	17	(0)
2021	UTC	12	(0)
2022–	ADT	3	(1)

International career
2008	Ivory Coast U23	3	(0)
- * Club domestic league appearances and goals as of 21:35, 16 January 2022 (UTC)

Hervé Kambou (born 1 May 1985) is an Ivorian professional footballer who plays for Peruvian club Asociación Deportiva Tarma.

== Club career ==
Kambou began his career at Jean-Marc Guillou's football school Académie de Sol Beni, joined than 2004 to Toumodi FC and one year later to Thailand club BEC Tero Sasana FC. In the 2007–08 season he played for R.O.C. de Charleroi-Marchienne in the Belgian Second Division, he leave the club after one year moved than in Summer 2008 to SC Bastia. In 2014, he joined Peruvian club Willy Serrato. Since then, he has remained playing in Peru, just leaving to play for Venezuelan club Zulia FC in the second half of 2017. Over the years, he became a naturalized citizen of Peru.

== International career ==
Kambou represented his country at the 2008 Olympic Games.
