= Darko Dunjić =

Serbian footballer

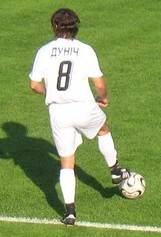

Personal information
- Date of birth: 8 February 1981 (age 45)
- Place of birth: Kraljevo, SFR Yugoslavia
- Height: 1.74 m (5 ft 9 in)
- Position: Right back

Senior career*
Years	Team	Apps	(Gls)
1997–1998	Sloga Kraljevo		
1998–2003	Red Star Belgrade	2	(0)
2000–2001	→ Spartak Subotica (loan)	25	(1)
2001–2002	→ Budućnost Banatski Dvor (loan)	20	(1)
2002–2003	→ Budućnost Banatski Dvor (loan)	13	(0)
2003–2004	Budućnost Banatski Dvor	41	(0)
2005–2006	Kryvbas Kryvyi Rih	45	(1)
2007–2008	Zorya Luhansk	36	(1)
2008–2011	Bastia	43	(0)
2012–2013	Napredak Kruševac	21	(1)
2014	Inđija	1	(0)

International career
- FR Yugoslavia U17
- FR Yugoslavia U19
- FR Yugoslavia U21
- * Club domestic league appearances and goals

Darko Dunjić (Serbian Cyrillic: Дарко Дуњић; born 8 February 1981) is a Serbian retired footballer who played as a defender.
