= Yamen Ben Zekry =

Tunisian footballer

Personal information
- Full name: Yamen Ben Zekri
- Date of birth: October 6, 1979 (age 47)
- Place of birth: Tunis, Tunisia
- Height: 1.83 m (6 ft 0 in)
- Position: Defender

Youth career
- 2001–2004: CS Hammam-Lif

Senior career*
Years	Team	Apps	(Gls)
2004–2006	Club Africain	16	(0)
2006–2007	Zamalek SC	15	(0)
2008	Al-Riffa	14	(0)
2008–2009	SC Bastia	21	(0)
2009–2010	Al-Shamal	?	(?)
2010–2011	Al Wahda Tripoli	?	(?)
2011–2013	Al-Salmiya SC	14	(0)

International career^{‡}
2007–2009	Tunisia	4	(0)
- * Club domestic league appearances and goals as of June 21, 2009 ‡ National team caps and goals as of 01:22, 20 October 2008 (UTC)

Yamen Ben Zekry (Arabic: يامن بن ذكري; born October 6, 1979, in Tunis) is a Tunisian footballer who was play for Al-Salmiya SC in Kuwait.

== Attributes ==
Ben Zakry is a good defender, but Ruud Krol, Zamalek's manager, claims he lacks pace.

== International career ==
He is an occasional Tunisian international and played his first match on 24 March 2007.
