= Romain Cabon =

French professional football player (born 1987)

Personal information
- Date of birth: 24 June 1987 (age 39)
- Place of birth: Brest, France
- Height: 1.84 m (6 ft 1/2 in)
- Position: Defender

Team information
- Current team: US Concarneau

Senior career*
Years	Team	Apps	(Gls)
2005–2008	Stade Brestois (B team)	32	(0)
2006–2007	Stade Brestois	1	(0)
2008–2010	Quimper Cornouaille FC	44	(1)
2010–2015	US Avranches	141	(5)
2015–	US Concarneau	0	(0)
- * Club domestic league appearances and goals

Romain Cabon (born 24 June 1987) is a French professional football player, who currently plays for US Concarneau.

== Career ==
He played on the professional level in Ligue 2 for Stade Brestois 29.
