= Nicolas Marin =

French footballer (born 1980)

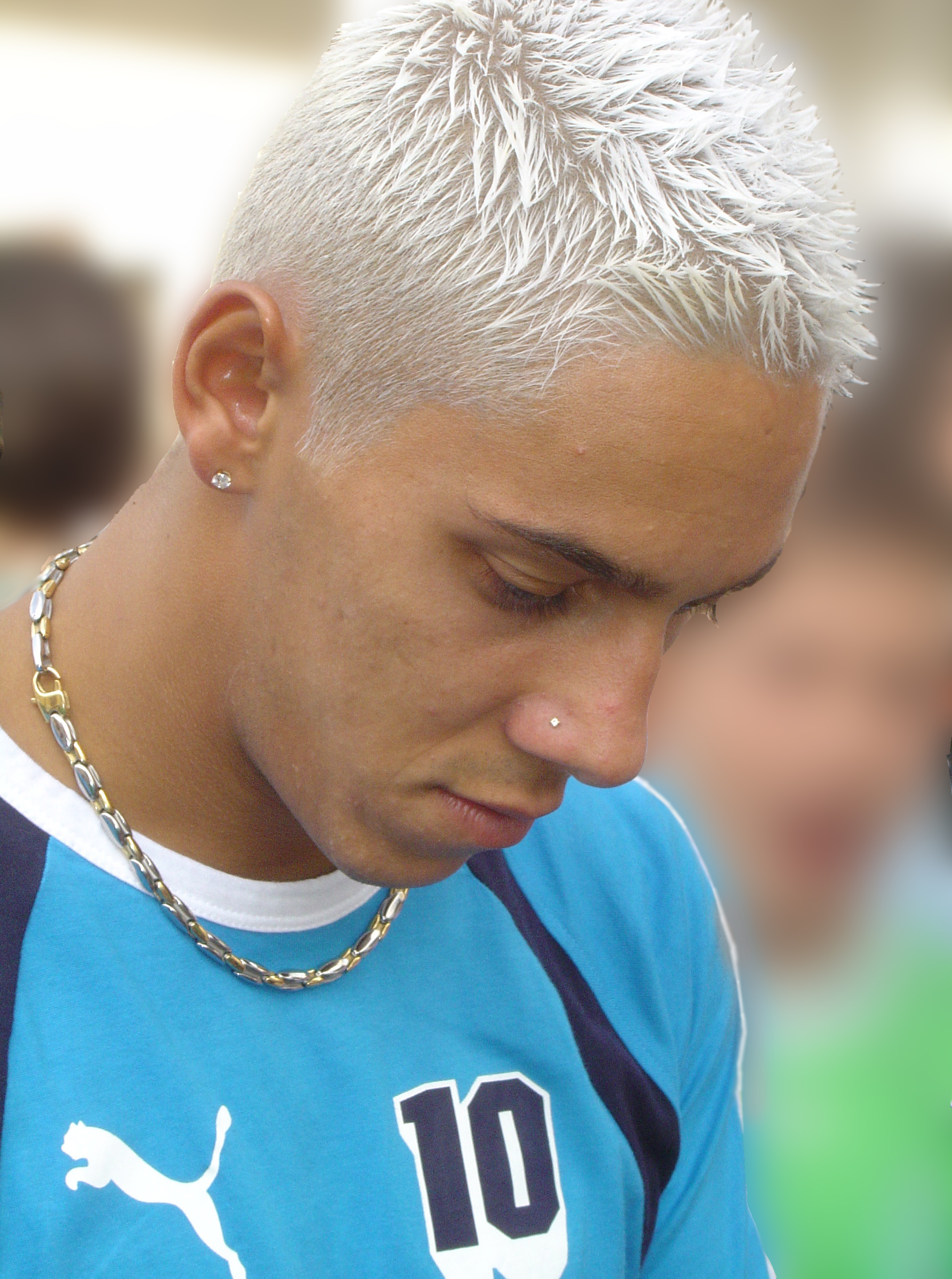
- Marin with Auxerre in 2004

Personal information
- Full name: Nicolas Marin
- Date of birth: 29 August 1980 (age 46)
- Place of birth: Marseille, France
- Height: 1.71 m (5 ft 7 in)
- Position: Midfielder

Youth career
- 1996–2000: Auxerre

Senior career*
Years	Team	Apps	(Gls)
2000–2004	Auxerre	2	(0)
2003–2004	→ Saint-Étienne (loan)	34	(6)
2004–2006	Saint-Étienne	26	(3)
2005–2006	→ Sedan (loan)	33	(3)
2006–2007	Sedan	28	(5)
2007–2009	Lorient	30	(1)
2008	→ Plymouth Argyle (loan)	6	(0)
2009	→ Bastia (loan)	16	(3)
2009–2011	Sion	44	(5)
2011–2012	Lausanne-Sport	13	(2)
2012	Dubai Club	13	(1)
2012–2014	Xanthi	47	(4)
2014–2015	Boulogne	0	(0)
2015–2016	Toulon	16	(0)
2017	AS Magenta	5	(5)
Total		313	(38)
- * Club domestic league appearances and goals

Nicolas Marin (born 29 August 1980) is a French former professional footballer who played as a midfielder. He played for Auxerre, Saint-Étienne, Sedan, Lorient, Plymouth Argyle, SC Bastia, Sion, Lausanne-Sport, Dubai Club and Xanthi.

== Career ==
Marin began his career with AJ Auxerre before establishing himself as a first-team regular at AS Saint-Étienne and then CS Sedan. Marin joined FC Lorient in 2007, but following a fallout with their manager Christian Gourcuff, Marin agreed to join English club Plymouth Argyle on a season-long loan with a view to a permanent move. But the loan was terminated through mutual consent at the beginning of January 2009. Marin is easily recognizable due to his bleached hair. After returning to Lorient, the club proceeded to terminate his contract. Later that day, Corsica-based side SC Bastia announced that they had signed him until the end of the season. On 11 August 2009, Marin joined FC Sion on free transfer. In July 2011, he signed a one-year contract with fellow Swiss club Lausanne-Sport. After scoring two goals in 13 league games for Lausanne, Marin was released from his contract in January 2012 in order to sign with UAE Pro-League side Dubai Club.

Marin retired in the summer 2017.
