= Brian Babit =

French professional footballer (born 1993)

Personal information
- Date of birth: 21 March 1993 (age 33)
- Place of birth: Saint-Avold, France
- Height: 1.70 m (5 ft 7 in)
- Position: Attacking midfielder

Team information
- Current team: FC UNA Strassen
- Number: 25

Senior career*
Years	Team	Apps	(Gls)
2012–2016	Dijon II	45	(32)
2012–2016	Dijon	27	(3)
2015	→ Amiens (loan)	14	(3)
2016	ASM Belfort	15	(1)
2017–2018	Sarreguemines	34	(15)
2018	Virton	6	(0)
2019–2022	Swift Hesperange	37	(26)
2022–	FC UNA Strassen	37	(9)
- * Club domestic league appearances and goals as of 26 June 2023

Brian Babit (born 21 March 1993) is a French professional footballer who plays as a midfielder for FC UNA Strassen.

== Club career ==
Babit made his professional debut in November 2012 in a 2–1 victory against Nîmes.

After Dijon, ASM Belfort, Sarreguemines and Virton, he moved to Swift Hesperange in December 2018.

On transfer deadline-day in January 2022, he moved to FC UNA Strassen.
