= Eloge Enza Yamissi =

Central African footballer (born 1983)

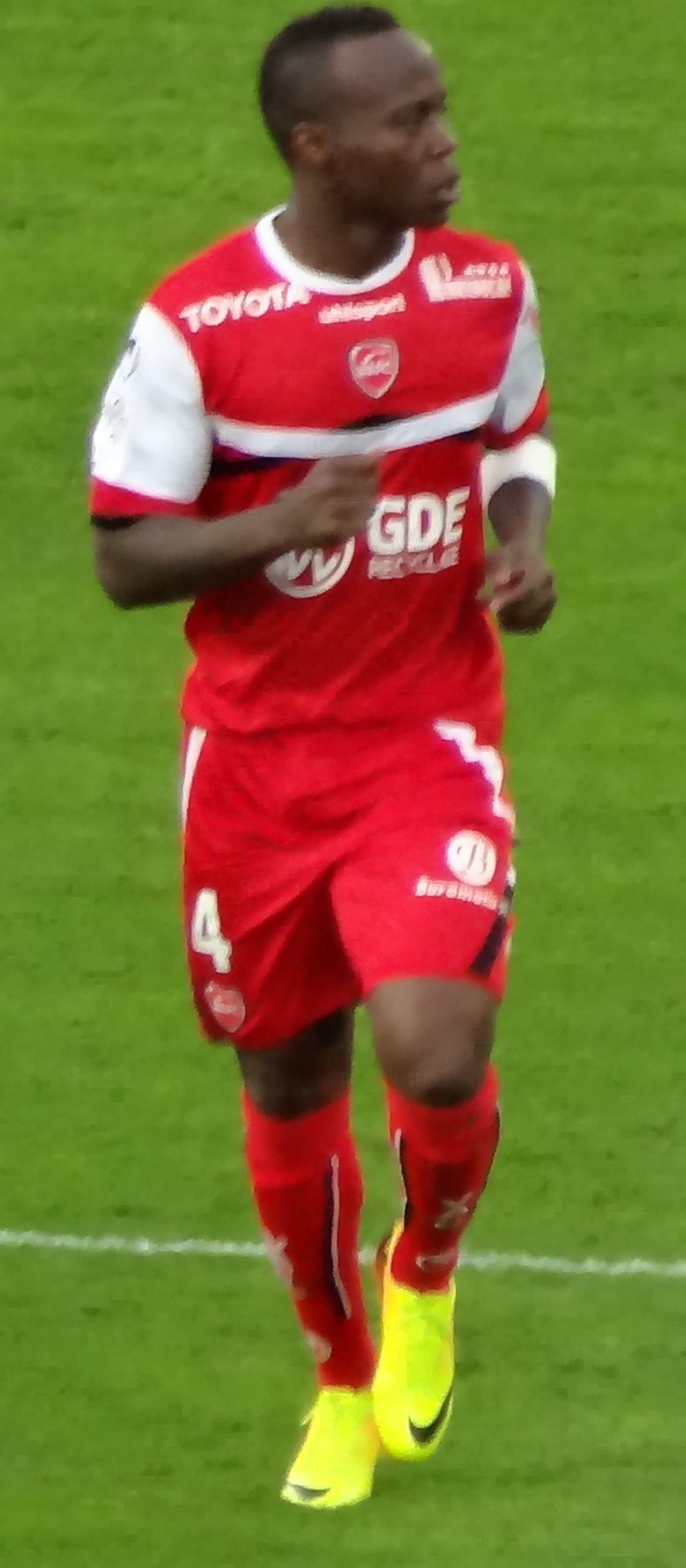
- Yamissi with Valenciennes in 2013

Personal information
- Full name: Eloge Ethisset Enza Yamissi
- Date of birth: 23 January 1983 (age 43)
- Place of birth: Bangui, Central African Republic
- Height: 1.75 m (5 ft 9 in)
- Position: Midfielder

Youth career
- Bordeaux

Senior career*
Years	Team	Apps	(Gls)
2001–2002	La Roche VF	6	(1)
2002–2003	Olympique Alès	4	(0)
2003–2005	Nîmes	52	(4)
2005–2013	Troyes	210	(5)
2013–2018	Valenciennes	110	(3)
2017–2018	Valenciennes B		
2019–2020	Annecy	14	(1)
2020–2022	Racing Besançon	24	(1)
Total		420	(15)

International career
2010–2019	Central African Republic	29	(1)

Managerial career
- 2022–2024: Racing Besançon (assistant)
- 2024–2025: Central African Republic (caretaker)
- 2025–2026: Central African Republic (caretaker)
- * Club domestic league appearances and goals

Eloge Ethisset Enza-Yamissi (born 23 January 1983) is a Central African professional football manager and former player who played as a midfielder.

== Early life ==
Enza-Yamissi was born in Bangui in 1983. His father Robert Enza was born in Fort-Crampel, Oubangui-Chari, in 1956. His mother Nicole was born in Batalimo, Central African Republic, in 1965. He acquired French nationality on 16 November 1999, through the collective effect connected to the reinstatement of his father in French nationality and the naturalization of his mother.

== Club career ==
Enza-Yamissi started his playing career at Bordeaux. He was there one season and did not make a first team appearance. He then signed for La Roche VF, spending one season there, playing six games. He then moved to Olympique Alès, where he played only four games, before moving to Nîmes Olympique, where his career began to take off, playing 52 games and scoring four goals.

His potential was noticed by Troyes AC, which promptly signed him in 2005, when it was in Ligue 1. He experienced several ups and downs at the club, being relegated twice, and winning promotion twice too. From 2011, he was club captain, which he led to promotion to Ligue 1 once again at the end of the 2011–12 season.

He joined Valenciennes FC in 2013 and played five seasons for the club before being released in 2018.

In February 2019 he joined Annecy FC. On 28 May 2020, it was announced that his contract at Annecy, which had just been promoted to the Championnat National, would not be renewed.

In summer 2022, after two seasons at Racing Besançon, Yamissi retired from playing and became assistant coach to David Le Frapper at the club.

== International career ==
Since its reformation in 2010, Enza Yamissi is a member of the Central African national team, which he captained on several occasions.

== Managerial career ==
Central African Football Federation appointed Enza-Yamissi as a caretaker manager of Central African Republic national team on 24 October 2024, replacing Raoul Savoy. He was reinstated after Rigobert Song was dismissed as Central African Republic national team manager on 10 March 2025 without overseeing a single match.

== Personal life ==
Eloge is the brother of the Central African Republic national team player Manassé Enza-Yamissi.

== Career statistics ==
Scores and results list Central African Republic's goal tally first, score column indicates score after each Enza Yamissi goal.

List of international goals scored by Eloge Enza Yamissi
No.	Date	Venue	Opponent	Score	Result	Competition
1	5 June 2016	Barthélemy Boganda Stadium, Bangui, Central African Republic	Angola	2–0	3–1	2017 Africa Cup of Nations qualification
