= Marco da Silva (French footballer) =

French footballer (born 1992)

Personal information
- Full name: Marco da Silva
- Date of birth: 10 April 1992 (age 34)
- Place of birth: Compiègne, France
- Height: 1.82 m (6 ft 0 in)
- Position: Midfielder

Youth career
- 2004–2007: Clairefontaine
- 2007–2013: Valenciennes

Senior career*
| Years | Team | Apps | (Gls) |
| 2010–2018 | Valenciennes | 23 | (1) |
| 2011–2014 | Valenciennes II | 43 | (8) |
| 2018–2019 | Krško | 39 | (5) |
| 2019–2020 | Domžale | 2 | (0) |
- * Club domestic league appearances and goals as of 28 September 2020

Marco da Silva (born 10 April 1992) is a French-Portuguese footballer who plays as a midfielder.

== Career ==
Da Silva is a former graduate of the Clairefontaine academy. After leaving Clairefontaine, da Silva joined Valenciennes and was promoted to its reserve team after two seasons in the club's youth academy. He helped the team earn promotion to the Championnat de France amateur in the 2010–11 season and is the team's current captain. Da Silva made his professional debut with Valenciennes on 31 August 2011 against Dijon in the Coupe de la Ligue. He started the match and was substituted out after 73 minutes as Valenciennes were defeated 3–2.
