= David Ducourtioux =

French footballer (born 1978)

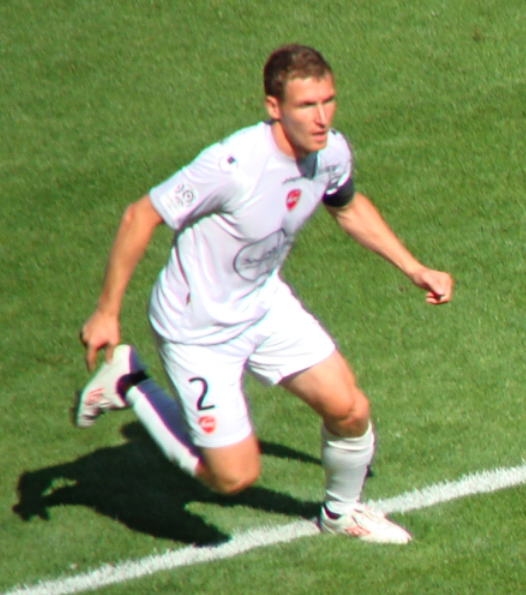
- Ducourtioux with Valenciennes in 2011

Personal information
- Date of birth: 11 April 1978 (age 48)
- Place of birth: Limoges, France
- Height: 1.77 m (5 ft 10 in)
- Position: Defender

Team information
- Current team: Lens (academy staff)

Youth career
- 1993–1997: Toulouse
- 1997–1998: Bastia

Senior career*
Years	Team	Apps	(Gls)
1998–2000	Bastia	2	(0)
2000–2002	Reims	88	(2)
2002–2007	Sedan	155	(9)
2007–2014	Valenciennes	218	(6)
2014–2017	Gazélec Ajaccio	98	(7)
Total		561	(24)

Managerial career
- 2019–2020: Strasbourg (assistant)
- 2020–2022: Gazélec Ajaccio
- 2022–2025: Lille (academy staff)
- 2025-: Lens (academy staff)
- * Club domestic league appearances and goals

David Ducourtioux (born 11 April 1978) is a French former professional footballer who played as a defender. He is currently a part of RC Lens' academy staff.

== Coaching career ==
After working a few years for Union Nationale des Footballeurs Professionnels, better known as just UNFP, Ducourtioux joined RC Strasbourg Alsace as assistant coach of Thierry Laurey. He left the position in May 2020. Two days later, he was appointed manager of Gazélec Ajaccio. He left the club at the end of May 2022.

In July 2022, Ducourtioux joined Lille OSC's academy as a coordinator and assistant to the center’s general manager, Jean-Michel Vandamme.

Juin 2025 responsible du centre de formation du RC Lens
