= Mickaël Cériélo =

French footballer (born 1984)

Personal information
- Full name: Mickaël Cériélo
- Date of birth: 1 September 1984 (age 42)
- Place of birth: Cannes, France
- Height: 1.76 m (5 ft 9 in)
- Position: Defender

Team information
- Current team: Villefranche

Senior career*
Years	Team	Apps	(Gls)
2001–2007	Cannes	158	(3)
2007–2008	Sedan	21	(0)
2008–2010	Châteauroux	48	(0)
2010–2011	Cannes	24	(0)
2011–2013	Red Star	65	(2)
2013–2019	Cannes		
2019–	Villefranche	3	(0)
- * Club domestic league appearances and goals as of 22:45, 17 November 2019 (UTC)

Mickaël Cériélo (born 1 September 1984) is a French professional footballer who currently plays as a defender for Championnat National 3 side Villefranche Saint-Jean Beaulieu FC.
