= AS Moulins =

French football club

Moulins
- Full name: Académie Sportive Moulins Football
- Founded: 1927
- Ground: Stade Hector Rolland
- Capacity: 1,000
- President: Rodolphe Rideau
- Manager: Alexis Raynaud
- League: Régional 1 Auvergne-Rhône-Alpes
- 2021–22: National 3 Group M, 14th (relegated)
- Website: asmoulinsfoot.fr
Home colours

Académie Sportive Moulins Football, commonly known as AS Moulins or simply Moulins, is a French football club based in Moulins. The club was founded in 1927 as Association Sportive Moulins Football 03 Auvergne, and was reborn under the current name in 2016 after the original club filed for bankruptcy. Moulins play at the Stade Hector Rolland, which has a capacity of 1,000, and the club colours are white and blue.

== Current squad ==
As of 22 February 2018

Note: Flags indicate national team as defined under FIFA eligibility rules; some limited exceptions apply. Players may hold more than one non-FIFA nationality.

No.	Pos.	Nation	Player
—	GK	FRA	Clément Guiot
—	GK	FRA	Grégoire Charpin
—	DF	FRA	Kévin Dumont
—	DF	FRA	Fabien Duron
—	DF	FRA	Mathieu Jaunet
—	DF	FRA	Alexis Raynaud
—	DF	MLI	Mamadou Sissoko
—	DF	FRA	Pierre Groisne
—	DF	FRA	Bastien Boissonnet
—	MF	FRA	Clément Kothe
—	MF	FRA	Lucas Gruet
—	MF	FRA	Kévin Sevestre

No.	Pos.	Nation	Player
—	MF	FRA	Jonathan Veline
—	MF	FRA	Yohan Couto
—	MF	FRA	Louis Leger
—	MF	FRA	Noham Daraa
—	FW	FRA	Victor Serve
—	FW	FRA	Simon Lopes
—	FW	FRA	Lucas Marceau
—	FW	FRA	Benjamin Margottat
—	FW	FRA	Yohan Djuga
—	FW	FRA	Etienne Charpin
—	FW	FRA	Maxime Brenon

== Notable players ==
- (France) Yanis Massolin (youth)

== Honours ==
- Division d'Honneur Auvergne: 1931, 1934, 1935, 1938, 1940, 1960, 1968, 1992, 2000
