= 2004–05 FC Girondins de Bordeaux season =

Bordeaux
2004–05 season
- President: Jean-Louis Triaud
- Head coach: Michel Pavon
- Stadium: Stade Chaban-Delmas
- Ligue 1: 15th
- Coupe de France: Round of 32
- Coupe de la Ligue: Round of 32
- Top goalscorer: League: Marouane Chamakh (10); All: Marouane Chamakh (11)
- Average home league attendance: 23,509
Home colours	Away colours	Third colours

The 2004–05 season was the 124th season in the existence of FC Girondins de Bordeaux and the club's 14th consecutive season in the top flight of French football. In addition to the domestic league, Bordeaux participated in this season's edition of the Coupe de France and the Coupe de la Ligue. The season covered the period from 1 July 2004 to 30 June 2005.

== Players ==
=== First-team squad ===
Squad at end of season

Note: Flags indicate national team as defined under FIFA eligibility rules; some limited exceptions apply. Players may hold more than one non-FIFA nationality.

No.	Pos.	Nation	Player
1	GK	FRA	Frédéric Roux
2	DF	FRA	David Jemmali (Note: Jemmali was born in Toulouse, France, but also qualified to represent Tunisia internationally and made his international debut for Tunisia in March 2006.)
4	DF	GRE	Michalis Kapsis
6	DF	FRA	Franck Jurietti
7	FW	FRA	Lilian Laslandes
8	MF	FRA	Cyril Rool
9	FW	FRA	Jean-Claude Darcheville (Note: Darcheville was born in Sinnamary, French Guiana, but represented France at U-21 level before making his international debut for French Guiana in 2012.)
10	MF	FRA	Camel Meriem
11	MF	ESP	Albert Riera
12	FW	NGR	Kalu Uche (on loan from Wisła Kraków)
16	GK	FRA	Ulrich Ramé
18	MF	FRA	Julien Faubert (Note: Faubert was born in Le Havre, France, and represented France at U-21 level before making his international debut for France in August 2006, but also qualified to represent Martinique internationally and made his international debut for Martinique in October 2014.)

No.	Pos.	Nation	Player
20	MF	ARG	Juan Pablo Francia
21	DF	FRA	Kodjo Afanou (Note: Afanou was born in Tabligbo, Togo, but was raised in France and represented France at U-21 level.)
26	MF	FRA	Rio Mavuba (Note: Mavuba was born in international waters to a Zairian father and Angolan mother, and did not hold nationality of any country until he obtained French citizenship in September 2004. He represented France at U-21 level before making his international debut for France in August 2004.)
25	DF	FRA	Gérald Cid
26	MF	FRA	Renaud Cohade
27	DF	FRA	Marc Planus
28	FW	RUS	Aleksei Kosonogov
29	FW	MAR	Marouane Chamakh (Note: Chamakh was born in Tonneins, France, and represented them at U-19 level, but also qualified to represent Morocco internationally and made his international debut for Morocco in June 2003.)
30	GK	FRA	Mathieu Valverde
33	FW	BRA	Thiago Ribeiro (on loan from Rio Branco)
34	MF	FRA	Ted Lavie
35	DF	FRA	Florian Marange

=== Left club during season ===
Note: Flags indicate national team as defined under FIFA eligibility rules; some limited exceptions apply. Players may hold more than one non-FIFA nationality.

No.	Pos.	Nation	Player
14	FW	GUI	Pascal Feindouno (to Saint-Étienne)
17	FW	FRA	Hervé Bugnet (to Montpellier)

No.	Pos.	Nation	Player
19	DF	POR	Bruno Basto (to Feyenoord)
31	FW	FRA	Sylvain Franco (on loan to Pau)

=== Reserve squad ===
Note: Flags indicate national team as defined under FIFA eligibility rules; some limited exceptions apply. Players may hold more than one non-FIFA nationality.

No.	Pos.	Nation	Player
—	DF	FRA	Paul Baysse
—	DF	FRA	Romain Brégerie
—	DF	FRA	Benoît Trémoulinas
—	DF	GUI	Abdoulaye Barry

No.	Pos.	Nation	Player
—	MF	FRA	Pierre Ducasse
—	MF	FRA	Erwan Quintin
—	MF	BRA	Adonis (on loan from Rio Branco)

== Competitions ==
=== Overall record ===
Competition	First match	Last match	Starting round	Final position	Record							
Competition	First match	Last match	Starting round	Final position	Pld	W	D	L	GF	GA	GD	Win %
Ligue 1	7 August 2004	28 May 2005	Matchday 1	15th	38	8	20	10	37	41	−4	21.05
Coupe de France	8 January 2005	13 February 2005	Round of 64	Round of 32	2	1	0	1	3	3	+0	50.00
Coupe de la Ligue	9 November 2004		Round of 32	Round of 32	1	0	0	1	1	2	−1	0.00
Total					41	9	20	12	41	46	−5	21.95

Source: Competitions

=== Ligue 1 ===
==== League table ====
Pos	Team	Pld	W	D	L	GF	GA	GD	Pts
13	Toulouse	38	12	10	16	36	43	−7	46
14	Ajaccio	38	10	15	13	36	40	−4	45
15	Bordeaux	38	8	20	10	37	41	−4	44
16	Metz	38	10	14	14	33	45	−12	44
17	Nantes	38	10	13	15	33	38	−5	43

Source: Ligue 1
Rules for classification: 1) points; 2) goal difference; 3) number of goals scored.

==== Results summary ====
Overall								Home						Away					
Pld	W	D	L	GF	GA	GD	Pts	W	D	L	GF	GA	GD	W	D	L	GF	GA	GD
38	8	20	10	37	41	−4	44	5	11	3	24	18	+6	3	9	7	13	23	−10

Source: Ligue 1

==== Results by round ====
Round	1	2	3	4	5	6	7	8	9	10	11	12	13	14	15	16	17	18	19	20	21	22	23	24	25	26	27	28	29	30	31	32	33	34	35	36	37	38
Ground	A	H	A	H	A	H	A	H	A	H	A	H	A	H	A	H	A	H	A	A	H	A	H	A	H	A	H	A	H	A	H	A	H	A	H	A	H	H
Result	L	W	D	W	D	D	W	D	D	D	D	D	L	W	W	D	D	D	D	D	L	L	W	L	D	L	D	W	W	L	L	D	L	D	D	L	D	D
Position	15	9	11	7	7	9	4	4	6	6	6	7	8	7	5	6	7	6	7	7	7	11	8	9	8	11	11	10	8	11	12	12	12	12	12	13	15	15

Source: Ligue 1
A = Away; H = Home; W = Win; D = Draw; L = Loss

==== Matches ====
7 August 2004 1	Marseille	1–0	Bordeaux	Marseille
CEST (UTC+2)				Stadium: Stade Vélodrome

14 August 2004 2	Bordeaux	5–1	Nice	Bordeaux
CEST (UTC+2)				Stadium: Stade Chaban-Delmas

21 August 2004 3	Lille	0–0	Bordeaux	Villeneuve-d'Ascq
CEST (UTC+2)				Stadium: Stadium Lille Métropole

28 August 2004 4	Bordeaux	2–0	Sochaux	Bordeaux
CEST (UTC+2)				Stadium: Stade Chaban-Delmas

11 September 2004 5	Metz	0–0	Bordeaux	Metz
CEST (UTC+2)				Stadium: Stade Saint-Symphorien

18 September 2004 6	Bordeaux	0–0	Rennes	Bordeaux
CEST (UTC+2)				Stadium: Stade Chaban-Delmas

22 September 2004 7	Bastia	1–4	Bordeaux	Furiani
CEST (UTC+2)				Stadium: Stade Armand Cesari

25 September 2004 8	Bordeaux	1–1	Toulouse	Bordeaux
CEST (UTC+2)				Stadium: Stade Chaban-Delmas

2 October 2004 9	Caen	1–1	Bordeaux	Caen
CEST (UTC+2)				Stadium: Stade Michel d'Ornano

16 October 2004 10	Bordeaux	2–2	Istres	Bordeaux
CEST (UTC+2)				Stadium: Stade Chaban-Delmas

23 October 2004 11	Saint-Étienne	0–0	Bordeaux	Saint-Étienne
CEST (UTC+2)				Stadium: Stade Geoffroy-Guichard

30 October 2004 12	Bordeaux	1–1	Lens	Bordeaux
CEST (UTC+2)				Stadium: Stade Chaban-Delmas

6 November 2004 13	Strasbourg	1–0	Bordeaux	Strasbourg
CEST (UTC+2)				Stadium: Stade de la Meinau

13 November 2004 14	Bordeaux	3–0	Paris Saint-Germain	Bordeaux
CEST (UTC+2)				Stadium: Stade Chaban-Delmas

20 November 2004 15	Nantes	0–1	Bordeaux	Nantes
CEST (UTC+2)				Stadium: Stade de la Beaujoire

27 November 2004 16	Bordeaux	0–0	Ajaccio	Bordeaux
CEST (UTC+2)				Stadium: Stade Chaban-Delmas

5 December 2004 17	Auxerre	0–0	Bordeaux	Auxerre
CEST (UTC+2)				Stadium: Stade de l'Abbé Deschamps

11 December 2004 18	Bordeaux	0–0	Lyon	Bordeaux
CEST (UTC+2)				Stadium: Stade Chaban-Delmas

18 December 2004 19	Monaco	1–1	Bordeaux	Monaco
CEST (UTC+2)				Stadium: Stade Louis II

12 January 2005 20	Nice	3–3	Bordeaux	Nîmes
CEST (UTC+2)				Stadium: Stade des Costières

15 January 2005 21	Bordeaux	1–3	Lille	Bordeaux
CEST (UTC+2)				Stadium: Stade Chaban-Delmas

22 January 2005 22	Sochaux	4–0	Bordeaux	Montbéliard
CEST (UTC+2)				Stadium: Stade Auguste Bonal

26 January 2005 23	Bordeaux	1–0	Metz	Bordeaux
CEST (UTC+2)				Stadium: Stade Chaban-Delmas

29 January 2005 24	Rennes	2–0	Bordeaux	Rennes
CEST (UTC+2)				Stadium: Stade de la Route de Lorient

5 February 2005 25	Bordeaux	0–0	Bastia	Bordeaux
CEST (UTC+2)				Stadium: Stade Chaban-Delmas

19 February 2005 26	Toulouse	1–0	Bordeaux	Toulouse
CEST (UTC+2)				Stadium: Stadium de Toulouse

26 February 2005 27	Bordeaux	2–2	Caen	Bordeaux
CEST (UTC+2)				Stadium: Stade Chaban-Delmas

5 March 2005 28	Istres	0–1	Bordeaux	Fos-sur-Mer
CEST (UTC+2)				Stadium: Stade Parsemain

12 March 2005 29	Bordeaux	2–0	Saint-Étienne	Bordeaux
CEST (UTC+2)				Stadium: Stade Chaban-Delmas

19 March 2005 30	Lens	2–0	Bordeaux	Lens
CEST (UTC+2)				Stadium: Stade Félix-Bollaert

2 April 2005 31	Bordeaux	0–2	Strasbourg	Bordeaux
CEST (UTC+2)				Stadium: Stade Chaban-Delmas

9 April 2005 32	Paris Saint-Germain	1–1	Bordeaux	Paris
CEST (UTC+2)				Stadium: Parc des Princes

16 April 2005 33	Bordeaux	0–2	Nantes	Bordeaux
CEST (UTC+2)				Stadium: Stade Chaban-Delmas

23 April 2005 34	Ajaccio	0–0	Bordeaux	Ajaccio
20:00 CEST (UTC+2)				Stadium: Stade François Coty; Attendance: 4,114; Referee: Gilles Veissière

6 May 2005 35	Bordeaux	0–0	Auxerre	Bordeaux
20:30 CEST (UTC+2)				Stadium: Stade Chaban-Delmas; Attendance: 20,586; Referee: Dominique Fraise

15 May 2005 36	Lyon	5–1	Bordeaux	Lyon
21:00 CEST (UTC+2)	Malouda 24'; Cris 34', 45+1'; Govou 67', 85'		Riera 10'	Stadium: Stade de Gerland; Attendance: 38,954; Referee: Pascal Garibian

21 May 2005 37	Bordeaux	1–1	Monaco	Bordeaux
20:45 CEST (UTC+2)	Chamakh 78'		Squillaci 90+2'	Stadium: Stade Chaban-Delmas; Attendance: 24,224; Referee: Laurent Duhamel

28 May 2005 38	Bordeaux	3–3	Marseille	Bordeaux
20:00 CEST (UTC+2)	Laslandes 17'; Meriem 65' (pen.); Francia 86'		Luyindula 22', 90+3' (pen.); Fiorèse 27'	Stadium: Stade Chaban-Delmas; Attendance: 32,712; Referee: Éric Poulat

=== Coupe de France ===
8 January 2005 Round of 64	Bordeaux	2–0	Istres	Bordeaux
20:00 CET (UTC+1)	Laslandes 21'; Jemmali 86'			Stadium: Stade Chaban-Delmas; Attendance: 8,781; Referee: Thierry Auriac

13 February 2005 Round of 32	Paris Saint-Germain	3–1 (a.e.t.)	Bordeaux	Paris
21:00 CET (UTC+1)	Yepes 87'; Pauleta 96', 117'		Chamakh 42'	Stadium: Parc des Princes; Attendance: 38,000; Referee: Gilles Veissière

=== Coupe de la Ligue ===
9 November 2004 Round of 32	Dijon	2–1 (a.e.t.)	Bordeaux	Dijon
21:00 CEST (UTC+2)	Heitzmann 16'; Mangione 120'		Cohade 48'	Stadium: Stade Gaston Gérard; Attendance: 6,507; Referee: Dominique Fraise

== Statistics ==
=== Goalscorers ===
Rank	No.	Pos	Nat	Name	Ligue 1	Coupe de France	Coupe de la Ligue	Total
1	29	FW	(Morocco)	Marouane Chamakh	10	1	0	11
2	7	FW	(France)	Lilian Laslandes	6	1	0	7
3	10	MF	(France)	Camel Meriem	6	0	0	6
4	9	FW	(France)	Jean-Claude Darcheville	4	0	0	4
5	11	MF	(Spain)	Albert Riera	2	0	0	2
5	20	MF	(Argentina)	Juan Pablo Francia	2	0	0	2
5	8	MF	(France)	Cyril Rool	2	0	0	2
Totals					37	3	1	41
