= 2003–04 FC Girondins de Bordeaux season =

Bordeaux
2003–04 season
- President: Jean-Louis Triaud
- Head coach: Élie Baup (until 24 October); Michel Pavon (from 24 October)
- Stadium: Stade Chaban-Delmas
- Ligue 1: 12th
- Coupe de France: Round of 32
- Coupe de la Ligue: Round of 16
- UEFA Cup: Quarter-finals
- Average home league attendance: 23,491
Home colours	Away colours	Third colours

The 2003–04 season was the 123rd season in the existence of FC Girondins de Bordeaux and the club's 13th consecutive season in the top flight of French football. In addition to the domestic league, Bordeaux participated in this season's edition of the Coupe de France, the Coupe de la Ligue and the UEFA Cup. The season covered the period from 1 July 2003 to 30 June 2004.

== Season summary ==
Without the goals of Pauleta, Bordeaux had a poor season and slipped to 12th in the league. Manager Élie Baup was sacked in October and replaced by former midfielder Michel Pavon, but results failed to improve. However, they did make an impressive run to the UEFA Cup quarter-finals.

== First team squad ==
Squad at end of season

Note: Flags indicate national team as defined under FIFA eligibility rules; some limited exceptions apply. Players may hold more than one non-FIFA nationality.

No.	Pos.	Nation	Player
1	GK	FRA	Frédéric Roux
2	DF	FRA	David Jemmali (Note: Jemmali was born in Toulouse, France, but also qualified to represent Tunisia internationally and would make his international debut for Tunisia in March 2006.)
3	DF	POR	Marco Caneira
4	DF	FRA	Hervé Alicarte
6	DF	FRA	Franck Jurietti
7	MF	BRA	Eduardo Costa
8	MF	ESP	Albert Celades (on loan from Real Madrid)
9	FW	FRA	Jean-Claude Darcheville (Note: Darcheville was born in Sinnamary, French Guiana, but also qualified to represent France internationally and represented them at U-21 level; he would later make his international debut for French Guiana in 2012.)
11	MF	ESP	Albert Riera
14	MF	GUI	Pascal Feindouno
16	GK	FRA	Ulrich Ramé
18	FW	BRA	Deivid

No.	Pos.	Nation	Player
19	DF	POR	Bruno Basto
20	MF	POR	Paulo Costa (on loan from Porto and Inter (Note: Costa was co-owned by Porto and Inter.))
21	DF	FRA	Kodjo Afanou (Note: Afanou was born in Tabligbo, Togo, but also qualified to represent France internationally and represented them at U-21 level.)
23	MF	BRA	Paulo Miranda
25	DF	FRA	Mathieu Béda
27	DF	FRA	Marc Planus
28	FW	RUS	Aleksei Kosonogov
29	FW	MAR	Marouane Chamakh (Note: Chamakh was born in Tonneins, France, and represented them at U-19 level, but also qualified to represent Morocco internationally and made his international debut for Morocco in June 2003.)
30	GK	FRA	Mathieu Valverde
31	FW	ARG	Juan Pablo Francia
32	MF	FRA	Rio Mavuba (Note: Mavuba was born at sea to a Zairian father and Angolan mother, and did not hold nationality of any country until he obtained French citizenship in September 2004.)

=== Left club during season ===
Note: Flags indicate national team as defined under FIFA eligibility rules; some limited exceptions apply. Players may hold more than one non-FIFA nationality.

No.	Pos.	Nation	Player
5	DF	ARG	Mauricio Pochettino (on loan to Espanyol)
8	MF	RUS	Alexei Smertin (to Chelsea)
10	MF	FRA	Camel Meriem (on loan to Marseille)

No.	Pos.	Nation	Player
17	MF	FRA	Nicolas Sahnoun (to Almería)
26	MF	SCG	Ivan Vukomanović (to Alania Vladikavkaz)

== Transfers ==
=== Out ===
- Pauleta - PSG, 10 July, €12,000,000

== Competitions ==
=== Overall record ===
Competition	First match	Last match	Starting round	Final position	Record							
Competition	First match	Last match	Starting round	Final position	Pld	W	D	L	GF	GA	GD	Win %
Ligue 1	2 August 2003	28 May 2004	Matchday 1	12th	38	13	11	14	40	43	−3	34.21
Coupe de France	3 January 2004	24 January 2004	Round of 64	Round of 32	2	1	0	1	2	1	+1	50.00
Coupe de la Ligue	28 October 2003	16 December 2003	Round of 32	Round of 16	2	1	0	1	1	2	−1	50.00
UEFA Cup	24 September 2003	14 April 2004	First round	Quarter-finals	10	6	1	3	16	9	+7	60.00
Total					52	21	12	19	59	55	+4	40.38

Source: Competitions

=== Ligue 1 ===
==== League table ====
Pos	Team	Pld	W	D	L	GF	GA	GD	Pts	Qualification or relegation
10	Lille	38	14	9	15	41	41	0	51	Qualification to Intertoto Cup third round
11	Nice	38	11	17	10	42	39	+3	50	Qualification to Intertoto Cup second round
12	Bordeaux	38	13	11	14	40	43	−3	50	
13	Strasbourg	38	10	13	15	43	50	−7	43	
14	Metz	38	11	9	18	34	42	−8	42	

Source: Ligue 1
Rules for classification: 1) points; 2) goal difference; 3) number of goals scored.

==== Results summary ====
Overall								Home						Away					
Pld	W	D	L	GF	GA	GD	Pts	W	D	L	GF	GA	GD	W	D	L	GF	GA	GD
38	13	11	14	40	43	−3	50	10	5	4	26	15	+11	3	6	10	14	28	−14

Source: Ligue 1

==== Results by round ====
Round	1	2	3	4	5	6	7	8	9	10	11	12	13	14	15	16	17	18	19	20	21	22	23	24	25	26	27	28	29	30	31	32	33	34	35	36	37	38
Ground	A	H	A	H	A	H	A	H	A	H	A	H	A	H	H	A	H	A	H	A	H	A	H	A	H	A	H	A	H	A	H	A	A	H	A	H	A	H
Result	L	L	W	W	D	L	L	W	D	L	D	W	D	W	D	L	W	L	W	W	W	L	W	D	D	L	W	L	D	D	D	L	W	D	L	W	L	L
Position	20	19	16	9	8	13	16	14	15	16	16	13	13	12	12	13	10	11	11	8	7	9	8	8	9	9	9	11	11	10	11	11	8	8	10	8	10	12

Source: Ligue 1
A = Away; H = Home; W = Win; D = Draw; L = Loss

==== Matches ====
2 August 2003 1	Monaco	2–0	Bordeaux	Monaco
17:15		Report		Stadium: Stade Louis II

9 August 2003 2	Bordeaux	0–1	Montpellier	Bordeaux
20:00		Report		Stadium: Stade Chaban-Delmas

16 August 2003 3	Guingamp	1–3	Bordeaux	Montpellier
20:00		Report		Stadium: Stade du Roudourou

23 August 2003 4	Bordeaux	2–0	Auxerre	Bordeaux
17:15		Report		Stadium: Stade Chaban-Delmas

30 August 2003 5	Nantes	0–0	Bordeaux	Nantes
20:00		Report		Stadium: Stade de la Beaujoire

13 September 2003 6	Bordeaux	1–3	Sochaux	Bordeaux
20:00		Report		Stadium: Stade Chaban-Delmas

20 September 2003 7	Lens	1–0	Bordeaux	Lens
20:00		Report		Stadium: Stade Félix-Bollaert

28 September 2003 8	Bordeaux	1–0	Ajaccio	Bordeaux
18:00		Report		Stadium: Stade Chaban-Delmas

4 October 2003 9	Le Mans	0–0	Bordeaux	Le Mans
20:00		Report		Stadium: Stade Léon-Bollée

18 October 2003 10	Bordeaux	1–2	Toulouse	Bordeaux
20:00		Report		Stadium: Stade Chaban-Delmas

25 October 2003 11	Nice	0–0	Bordeaux	Nice
20:00		Report		Stadium: Stade du Ray

1 November 2003 12	Bordeaux	1–0	Marseille	Bordeaux
20:00		Report		Stadium: Stade Chaban-Delmas

9 November 2003 13	Strasbourg	1–1	Bordeaux	Strasbourg
18:00		Report		Stadium: Stade de la Meinau

22 November 2003 14	Bordeaux	2–1	Rennes	Bordeaux
20:00		Report		Stadium: Stade Chaban-Delmas

30 November 2003 15	Bordeaux	1–1	Bastia	Bordeaux
18:00		Report		Stadium: Stade Chaban-Delmas

6 December 2003 17	Bordeaux	2–1	Lille	Bordeaux
20:00		Report		Stadium: Stade Chaban-Delmas

13 December 2003 18	Paris Saint-Germain	2–1	Bordeaux	Paris
17:15		Report		Stadium: Parc des Princes

20 December 2003 19	Bordeaux	2–0	Metz	Bordeaux
20:00		Report		Stadium: Stade Chaban-Delmas

10 January 2004 20	Montpellier	1–2	Bordeaux	Montpellier
20:00		Report		Stadium: Stade de la Mosson

17 January 2004 21	Bordeaux	2–0	Guingamp	Bordeaux
20:00		Report		Stadium: Stade Chaban-Delmas

28 January 2004 16	Lyon	3–0	Bordeaux	Lyon
21:00		Report		Stadium: Stade de Gerland

31 January 2004 22	Auxerre	5–0	Bordeaux	Auxerre
17:15		Report		Stadium: Stade de l'Abbé-Deschamps

6 February 2004 23	Bordeaux	2–0	Nantes	Bordeaux
21:00		Report		Stadium: Stade Chaban-Delmas

14 February 2004 24	Sochaux	1–1	Bordeaux	Montbéliard
17:15		Report		Stadium: Stade Auguste Bonal

21 February 2004 25	Bordeaux	0–0	Lens	Bordeaux
20:00		Report		Stadium: Stade Chaban-Delmas

29 February 2004 26	Ajaccio	1–0	Bordeaux	Ajaccio
18:00		Report		Stadium: Stade François Coty

6 March 2004 27	Bordeaux	2–0	Le Mans	Bordeaux
20:00		Report		Stadium: Stade Chaban-Delmas

14 March 2004 28	Toulouse	1–0	Bordeaux	Toulouse
18:00		Report		Stadium: Stadium de Toulouse

20 March 2004 29	Bordeaux	1–1	Nice	Bordeaux
20:00		Report		Stadium: Stade Chaban-Delmas

28 March 2004 30	Marseille	1–1	Bordeaux	Marseille
18:30		Report		Stadium: Stade Vélodrome

3 April 2004 31	Bordeaux	1–1	Strasbourg	Bordeaux
20:00		Report		Stadium: Stade Chaban-Delmas

18 April 2004 32	Rennes	3–1	Bordeaux	Rennes
18:00		Report		Stadium: Stade de la Route de Lorient

24 April 2004 33	Bastia	0–2	Bordeaux	Furiani
20:00		Report		Stadium: Stade Armand Cesari

2 May 2004 34	Bordeaux	1–1	Lyon	Bordeaux
20:45		Report		Stadium: Stade Chaban-Delmas

8 May 2004 35	Lille	2–1	Bordeaux	Villeneuve d'Ascq
20:00		Report		Stadium: Stadium Lille Métropole

11 May 2004 36	Bordeaux	3–0	Paris Saint-Germain	Bordeaux
20:45		Report		Stadium: Stade Chaban-Delmas

15 May 2004 37	Metz	3–1	Bordeaux	Metz
20:00		Report		Stadium: Stade Saint-Symphorien

21 May 2004 38	Bordeaux	1–3	Monaco	Bordeaux
20:30		Report		Stadium: Stade Chaban-Delmas

=== Coupe de France ===
3 January 2004 Round of 64	Bordeaux	2–0	Libourne Saint-Seurin	Bordeaux
				Stadium: Stade Chaban-Delmas

23 January 2004 Round of 32	Bayonne	1–0 (a.e.t.)	Bordeaux	Bayonne
				Stadium: Stade Didier Deschamps

=== Coupe de la Ligue ===
28 October 2003 Round of 32	Strasbourg	0–1	Bordeaux	Strasbourg
20:00 CET (UTC+1)			Deivid 31'	Stadium: Stade de la Meinau; Attendance: 15,159; Referee: Bertrand Layec

16 December 2003 Round of 16	Lens	2–0	Bordeaux	Lens
21:00 CET (UTC+1)	Rool 44'; Utaka 85'			Stadium: Stade Bollaert-Delelis; Attendance: 30,594; Referee: Gilles Veissière

=== UEFA Cup ===
==== First round ====
24 September 2003 First leg	Bordeaux (France)	2–1	(Slovakia) Artmedia Petržalka	Bordeaux, France
20:45 CEST (UTC+2)	Riera 7'; Darcheville 36'	Report	de Vries 16'	Stadium: Stade Chaban-Delmas; Attendance: 17,000; Referee: Jörg Keßler (Germany)

15 October 2003 Second leg	Artmedia Petržalka (Slovakia)	1–1 (2–3 agg.)	(France) Bordeaux	Bratislava, Slovakia
18:45 CEST (UTC+2)	Krejčí 90'	Report	Darcheville 85'	Stadium: Tehelné pole Attendance: 3,500; Referee: Dejan Delević (Serbia and Montenegro)

==== Second round ====
6 November 2003 First leg	Bordeaux (France)	0–1	(Scotland) Hearts	Bordeaux, France
18:30 CET (UTC+1)		Report	de Vries 79'	Stadium: Stade Chaban-Delmas; Attendance: 18,000; Referee: Kristinn Jakobsson (Iceland)

27 November 2003 Second leg	Hearts (Scotland)	0–2 (1–2 agg.)	(France) Bordeaux	Edinburgh, Scotland
20:45 CET (UTC+1)		Report	Riera 8'; Feindouno 66'	Stadium: Tynecastle Stadium; Attendance: 17,700; Referee: Grzegorz Gilewski (Poland)

==== Third round ====
26 February 2004 First leg	Groclin (Poland)	0–1	(France) Bordeaux	Grodzisk Wielkopolski, Poland
18:00 CET (UTC+1)		Report	Chamakh 90'	Stadium: Stadion Dyskobolia; Attendance: 5,000; Referee: Stefan Messner (Austria)

3 March 2004 Second leg	Bordeaux (France)	4–1 (5–1 agg.)	(Poland) Groclin	Bordeaux, France
18:45 CET (UTC+1)	Planus 41'; Chamakh 42'; Križanac 64' (o.g.); Riera 74' (pen.)	Report	Wieszczycki 90'	Stadium: Stade Chaban-Delmas; Attendance: 9,197; Referee: Paulo Costa (Portugal)

==== Fourth round ====
11 March 2004 First leg	Bordeaux (France)	3–1	(Belgium) Club Brugge	Bordeaux, France
19:00 CET (UTC+1)	Celades 60', 71'; Riera 87'	Report	Verheyen 58'	Stadium: Stade Chaban-Delmas; Attendance: 14,398; Referee: Steve Bennett (England)

25 March 2004 Second leg	Club Brugge (Belgium)	0–1 (1–4 agg.)	(France) Bordeaux	Bruges, Belgium
19:30 CET (UTC+1)		Report	Chamakh 84'	Stadium: Jan Breydel Stadium; Attendance: 23,700; Referee: Massimo De Santis (Italy)

==== Quarter-finals ====
8 April 2004 First leg	Bordeaux (France)	1–2	(Spain) Valencia	Bordeaux, France
19:15 CEST (UTC+2)	Riera 18'	Report	Baraja 75'; Rufete 88'	Stadium: Stade Chaban-Delmas; Attendance: 29,108; Referee: Mike Riley (England)

14 April 2004 Second leg	Valencia (Spain)	2–1 (4–2 agg.)	(France) Bordeaux	Valencia, Spain
21:45 CEST (UTC+2)	Pellegrino 52'; Rufete 60'	Report	Eduardo 71'	Stadium: Mestalla Stadium; Attendance: 32,000; Referee: Herbert Fandel (Germany)
