= Mathieu Valverde =

French footballer (born 1983)

Personal information
- Date of birth: 14 May 1983 (age 43)
- Place of birth: Montreuil, France
- Height: 1.85 m (6 ft 1 in)
- Position: Goalkeeper

Senior career*
Years	Team	Apps	(Gls)
2003–2009	Bordeaux	22	(0)
2009–2010	Boulogne	9	(0)
2010–2011	Toulouse	37	(0)
2011–2012	Lyon	0	(0)
2012–2016	Anorthosis Famagusta	38	(0)
2015	→ Ethnikos Achna (loan)	13	(0)
Total		119	(0)
- * Club domestic league appearances and goals

Matthieu Valverde (born 14 May 1983) is a French former professional footballer who played as a goalkeeper.

== Career ==
Valverde began his professional career at Girondins de Bordeaux. After the departure of second-choice keeper Frédéric Roux, Valverde was given the #1 shirt and was set to serve as understudy to French international Ulrich Ramé. While Roux was at the club, Valverde made only two league appearances in three years. Bordeaux won the Coupe de la Ligue in 2007, but Ramé started and Valverde was left on the bench. However two years later Bordeaux won the Coupe de la Ligue again but this time roles were reversed; Valverde played and Ramé was left on the bench. He also made 12 appearances as Bordeaux won the 2008–09 Ligue 1 title. On 24 July 2009, Valverde joined recently promoted club US Boulogne. On 9 December, due to numerous injuries suffered by their goalkeepers, Toulouse FC acquired Valverde from Boulogne.

=== Lyon ===
With Olympique Lyonnais' reserve keepers Remy Vercoutre and Anthony Lopes both missing through injury, Valverde was brought in until the end of the 2011–12 season to deputise for Lyon's first choice goalkeeper, Hugo Lloris.

== Career statistics ==
Appearances and goals by club, season and competition
Club	Season	League			National cup		League cup		Europe		Other		Total	
Club	Season	Division	Apps	Goals	Apps	Goals	Apps	Goals	Apps	Goals	Apps	Goals	Apps	Goals
Bordeaux	2001–02	Division 1	0	0	0	0	0	0	0	0	—		0	0
Bordeaux	2002–03	Ligue 1	0	0	0	0	0	0	0	0	—		0	0
Bordeaux	2003–04	Ligue 1	1	0	0	0	0	0	0	0	—		1	0
Bordeaux	2004–05	Ligue 1	1	0	0	0	0	0	—		—		1	0
Bordeaux	2005–06	Ligue 1	0	0	0	0	0	0	—		—		0	0
Bordeaux	2006–07	Ligue 1	0	0	1	0	0	0	0	0	—		1	0
Bordeaux	2007–08	Ligue 1	5	0	0	0	0	0	1	0	—		6	0
Bordeaux	2008–09	Ligue 1	15	0	1	0	3	0	3	0	0	0	22	0
Bordeaux	Total		22	0	2	0	3	0	4	0	0	0	31	0
Boulogne	2009–10	Ligue 1	9	0	0	0	0	0	—		—		9	0
Toulouse	2009–10	Ligue 1	8	0	2	0	3	0	1	0	—		14	0
Toulouse	2010–11	Ligue 1	29	0	1	0	0	0	—		—		30	0
Toulouse	Total		37	0	3	0	3	0	1	0	—		44	0
Lyon	2011–12	Ligue 1	0	0	1	0	0	0	0	0	—		1	0
Anorthosis Famagusta	2012–13	Cypriot First Division	20	0	2	0	—		—		—		22	0
Anorthosis Famagusta	2013–14	Cypriot First Division	17	0	2	0	—		1	0	—		20	0
Anorthosis Famagusta	2014–15	Cypriot First Division	1	0	0	0	—		—		—		1	0
Anorthosis Famagusta	Total		38	0	4	0	—		1	0	—		43	0
Ethnikos Achna (loan)	2014–15	Cypriot First Division	13	0	1	0	—		—		—		14	0
Career total			119	0	11	0	6	0	6	0	0	0	142	0

== Honours ==
Bordeaux

- Ligue 1: 2008–09
- Trophée des Champions: 2008
- Coupe de la Ligue: 2006–07, 2008–09
