= Gérald Cid =

French footballer (born 1983)

Personal information
- Full name: Gérald Cid
- Date of birth: 17 February 1983 (age 43)
- Place of birth: Talence, France
- Height: 1.88 m (6 ft 2 in)
- Position: Centre back

Youth career
- 1999–2001: Bordeaux

Senior career*
Years	Team	Apps	(Gls)
2001–2007	Bordeaux	19	(2)
2005–2006	→ Istres (loan)	24	(0)
2007–2008	Bolton Wanderers	7	(0)
2008–2010	Nice	42	(0)
Total		92	(2)
- * Club domestic league appearances and goals

Gérald Cid (born 17 February 1983) is a French former professional footballer who played as a centre back. He played Ligue 1 football for Bordeaux and Nice, spent a season on loan at Ligue 2 club Istres, and played briefly for English Premier League club Bolton Wanderers. He represented both Bordeaux and Bolton in European competition.

== Early life and career ==
Gérald Cid was born on 17 February 1983 in Talence, Gironde. He joined Premier League club Bolton Wanderers from Bordeaux in July 2007, having spent eight years with the French club. He left the club in mid-January 2008 by mutual consent and returned to France, joining Ligue 1 side Nice, on a three-and-a-half-year deal.

On 16 July 2010, Cid announced his retirement.

== Career statistics ==
Appearances and goals by club, season and competition
Club	Season	League			National Cup (Note: Includes Coupe de France, FA Cup)		League Cup (Note: Includes Coupe de la Ligue, Football League Cup)		Other		Total	
Club	Season	Division	Apps	Goals	Apps	Goals	Apps	Goals	Apps	Goals	Apps	Goals
Bordeaux	2003–04	Ligue 1	1	0	1	0	0	0	0	0	2	0
Bordeaux	2004–05	Ligue 1	8	1	0	0	0	0	—		8	1
Bordeaux	2006–07	Ligue 1	10	1	2	0	3	0	4 (Note: Two appearances in UEFA Champions League, two in UEFA Cup)	0	19	1
Bordeaux	Total		19	2	3	0	3	0	4	0	29	2
Istres (loan)	2005–06	Ligue 2	24	0	1	0	1	0	—		26	0
Bolton Wanderers	2007–08	Premier League	7	0	1	0	1	0	5 (Note: Appearances in UEFA Cup)	0	14	0
Nice	2007–08	Ligue 1	9	0	1	0	0	0	—		10	0
Nice	2008–09	Ligue 1	20	0	1	0	2	1	—		23	1
Nice	2009–10	Ligue 1	13	0	1	0	0	0	—		14	0
Nice	Total		42	0	3	0	2	1	—		47	1
Career total			92	2	8	0	7	1	9	0	116	3
