= 2007–08 Olympique Lyonnais season =

Lyon
2007–08 season
- Owner: OL Groupe
- Chairman: Jean-Michel Aulas
- Manager: Alain Perrin
- Stadium: Stade de Gerland
- Ligue 1: 1st
- Coupe de France: Winners
- Coupe de la Ligue: Quarter-finals
- Trophée des Champions: Winners
- Champions League: Round of 16
- Top goalscorer: League: Karim Benzema (20); All: Karim Benzema (31)
- Highest home attendance: 40,381 vs Bordeaux (9 March 2008)
- Lowest home attendance: 20,012 vs Sochaux (18 March 2008)
Home colours	Away colours	Third colours

The 2007–08 season was Olympique Lyonnais's 49th season in Ligue 1 and their 19th consecutive season in the top division of French football. They were the defending champions having won the title the past six consecutive seasons.

== Current squad ==
As of 8 March 2008. Note: Flags indicate national team as defined under FIFA eligibility rules; some limited exceptions apply. Players may hold more than one non-FIFA nationality.

No.	Pos.	Nation	Player
1	GK	FRA	Grégory Coupet (vice-captain)
2	DF	FRA	François Clerc
3	DF	BRA	Cris (vice-captain)
4	DF	SUI	Patrick Müller
5	MF	FRA	Mathieu Bodmer
6	MF	SWE	Kim Källström
7	FW	CZE	Milan Baroš
8	MF	BRA	Juninho (captain)
9	FW	BRA	Fred
10	FW	FRA	Karim Benzema
11	DF	ITA	Fabio Grosso
14	MF	FRA	Sidney Govou
18	MF	FRA	Hatem Ben Arfa
19	FW	ARG	César Delgado

No.	Pos.	Nation	Player
20	DF	FRA	Anthony Réveillère
21	MF	ESP	Marc Crosas (on loan from Barcelona)
22	DF	BRA	Anderson
23	FW	CIV	Kader Keïta
24	MF	FRA	Romain Beynié
25	GK	FRA	Joan Hartock
27	FW	FRA	Anthony Mounier
28	MF	FRA	Jérémy Toulalan
29	DF	FRA	Sébastien Squillaci
30	GK	FRA	Rémy Vercoutre
32	DF	FRA	Jean-Alain Boumsong
33	DF	FRA	Mickael Charvet
35	GK	FRA	Frédéric Roux

=== Transfers ===
==== In ====
Note: Flags indicate national team as defined under FIFA eligibility rules; some limited exceptions apply. Players may hold more than one non-FIFA nationality.

No.	Pos.	Nation	Player
5	MF	FRA	Mathieu Bodmer (€6.5M from Lille)
11	DF	ITA	Fabio Grosso (€7M from Internazionale)
21	DF	ALG	Nadir Belhadj (loan return from Sedan)
22	DF	BRA	Anderson (€4M from Benfica)
23	FW	CIV	Kader Keïta (€18M from Lille)

No.	Pos.	Nation	Player
35	GK	FRA	Frédéric Roux (free agent from Ajaccio)
19	FW	ARG	César Delgado (€10M from Cruz Azul)
21	MF	ESP	Marc Crosas (on loan from Barcelona until the end of the season)
32	DF	FRA	Jean-Alain Boumsong (€3M from Juventus)
--	MF	BRA	Ederson (€15M from Nice, official in June 2008)

==== Out ====
Note: Flags indicate national team as defined under FIFA eligibility rules; some limited exceptions apply. Players may hold more than one non-FIFA nationality.

No.	Pos.	Nation	Player
5	DF	BRA	Caçapa (Free transfer to Newcastle United)
10	MF	FRA	Florent Malouda (€21M to Chelsea)
15	MF	FRA	Alou Diarra (€7.75M to Bordeaux)
20	DF	FRA	Eric Abidal (€15M to Barcelona)
21	MF	POR	Tiago (€13M to Juventus)
23	DF	FRA	Jérémy Berthod (€2M to Monaco)

No.	Pos.	Nation	Player
38	FW	FRA	Gregory Bettiol (€0.33M to Troyes)
39	DF	FRA	Mourad Benhamida (Free transfer to Montpellier)
--	GK	FRA	Rémy Riou (€0.8M to Auxerre)
22	FW	FRA	Sylvain Wiltord (€1.5M to Rennes)
21	DF	ALG	Nadir Belhadj (€3.6M to Lens)

==== Players out on loan ====
Note: Flags indicate national team as defined under FIFA eligibility rules; some limited exceptions apply. Players may hold more than one non-FIFA nationality.

No.	Pos.	Nation	Player
26	MF	BRA	Fábio Santos (6 month loan to São Paulo)
7	FW	CZE	Milan Baroš (6 month loan to Portsmouth)
12	FW	FRA	Loïc Rémy (on loan to Lens until the end of the season)
15	DF	FRA	Sandy Paillot (on loan to Grenoble until the end of the season)

== Club ==
=== Management ===
Position	Staff
Manager	(France) Alain Perrin
Assistant manager	(France) Rémi Garde
Assistant manager	(France) Christophe Galtier
Assistant manager	(France) Bruno Genesio
Club doctor	(France) Jean-Jacques Amprino
Goalkeeping coach	(France) Joël Bats
Special Advisor	(France) Bernard Lacombe

Last updated: 30 May 2007
Source: Olympique Lyonnais

=== Kit ===
Supplier: Umbro
Sponsor(s): Novotel (home), Ticket Restaurant (away), Renault Trucks (alternate)

Home	Away	Third/Euro Kit	Alternate Away

Source: OL Boutique

=== Other information ===
Chairman	(France) Jean-Michel Aulas
Ground (capacity and dimensions)	Stade Gerland (41,044 / 112x65 yards)

Source: Stade Gerland Profile

== Competitions ==
=== Overview ===
Competition	First match	Last match	Starting round	Final position	Record							
Competition	First match	Last match	Starting round	Final position	Pld	W	D	L	GF	GA	GD	Win %
Ligue 1	5 August 2007	17 May 2008	Matchday 1	Winners	38	24	7	7	74	37	+37	63.16
Coupe de France	6 January 2008	24 May 2008	Round of 64	Winners	6	6	0	0	10	1	+9	100.00
Coupe de la Ligue	31 October 2007	16 January 2008	Round of 16	Quarter-finals	2	1	0	1	3	2	+1	50.00
Trophée des Champions	28 July 2007		Final	Winners	1	1	0	0	2	1	+1	100.00
UEFA Champions League	19 September 2007	4 March 2008	Group stage	Round of 16	8	3	2	3	12	12	+0	37.50
Total					55	35	9	11	101	53	+48	63.64

Source: Competitions

=== Trophée des Champions ===
28 July 2007 Final	Lyon	2–1	Sochaux	Lyon
17:50 CEST	Govou 21'; Cris 43'		Birsa 13'	Stadium: Stade de Gerland; Attendance: 30,413; Referee: Sandryk Biton

=== Ligue 1 ===
After a tough Ligue 1 season marred by injuries to key players, Lyon became champions for the seventh consecutive season holding off Bordeaux. They claimed the title after defeating Auxerre on the final day of the season.

==== League table ====
Pos	Team	Pld	W	D	L	GF	GA	GD	Pts	Qualification or relegation
1	Lyon (C)	38	24	7	7	74	37	+37	79	Qualification to Champions League group stage
2	Bordeaux	38	22	9	7	65	38	+27	75	Qualification to Champions League group stage
3	Marseille	38	17	11	10	58	45	+13	62	Qualification to Champions League third qualifying round
4	Nancy	38	15	15	8	44	30	+14	60	Qualification to UEFA Cup first round
5	Saint-Étienne	38	16	10	12	47	34	+13	58	Qualification to UEFA Cup first round

Source: Ligue 1
Rules for classification: 1) points; 2) goal difference; 3) number of goals scored.
(C) Champions

==== Results summary ====
Overall								Home						Away					
Pld	W	D	L	GF	GA	GD	Pts	W	D	L	GF	GA	GD	W	D	L	GF	GA	GD
38	24	7	7	74	37	+37	79	14	4	1	44	16	+28	10	3	6	30	21	+9

Last updated: May 17, 2008.
Source: Olympique Lyonnais Statistics

==== Results by round ====
Round	1	2	3	4	5	6	7	8	9	10	11	12	13	14	15	16	17	18	19	20	21	22	23	24	25	26	27	28	29	30	31	32	33	34	35	36	37	38
Ground	H	A	H	A	H	A	H	A	H	A	H	A	H	H	A	H	A	H	A	H	A	H	A	H	A	H	A	H	A	H	A	A	H	A	H	A	H	A
Result	W	L	L	W	W	W	W	D	W	W	W	W	W	L	W	W	L	D	D	W	L	W	D	W	L	W	W	W	W	W	W	L	D	W	D	D	W	W
Position	3	7	8	7	4	2	1	2	4	2	1	1	1	1	1	1	1	1	1	1	1	1	1	1	1	1	1	1	1	1	1	1	1	1	1	1	1	1

Source: Olympique Lyonnais Results
A = Away; H = Home; W = Win; D = Draw; L = Loss

==== Matches ====
5 August 2007 1	Lyon	2–0	Auxerre	Lyon
21:00 CEST	Baroš 33'; Benzema 70'			Stadium: Stade de Gerland; Attendance: 35,537; Referee: Laurent Duhamel

11 August 2007 2	Toulouse	1–0	Lyon	Toulouse
17:10 CEST	Elmander 90'			Stadium: Stadium de Toulouse; Attendance: 24,980; Referee: Olivier Thual

18 August 2007 4	Lorient	2–1	Lyon	Lorient
20:00 CEST	Vahirua 14', 66'		Benzema 32'	Stadium: Stade du Moustoir; Attendance: 14,612; Referee: Saïd Ennjimi

18 August 2007 5	Lyon	1–0	Saint-Étienne	Lyon
21:00 CEST	Benzema 54'			Stadium: Stade de Gerland; Attendance: 38,438; Referee: Stéphane Bré

29 August 2007 6	Sochaux	1–2	Lyon	Montbéliard
20:45 CEST	Birsa 22' (pen.)		Benzema 20'; Bodmer 57'	Stadium: Stade Auguste Bonal; Attendance: 15,744; Referee: Jean-Charles Cailleux

1 September 2007 7	Lyon	3–2	Le Mans	Lyon
20:00 CEST	Govou 71'; Benzema 76'; Baroš 78'		Sessègnon 43', 55'	Stadium: Stade de Gerland; Attendance: 35,042; Referee: Bruno Coué

15 September 2007 8	Metz	1–5	Lyon	Metz
20:00 CEST	Gueye 46'		Benzema 4', 36', 38'; Ben Arfa 58'; Juninho 86'	Stadium: Stade Saint-Symphorien; Attendance: 21,988; Referee: Philippe Malige

23 September 2007 9	Lyon	1–1	Lille	Lyon
21:00 CEST	Govou 58'		Bastos 17'	Stadium: Stade de Gerland; Attendance: 32,658; Referee: Saïd Ennjimi

29 September 2007 3	Lyon	3–0	Lens	Lyon
18:00 CEST	Santos 42'; Källström 81'; Benzema 90'			Stadium: Stade de Gerland; Attendance: 38,420; Referee: Thierry Auriac

7 October 2007 10	Bordeaux	1–3	Lyon	Bordeaux
18:00 CEST	Jussiê 85'		Anderson 5'; Benzema 23'; Källström 59'	Stadium: Stade Chaban-Delmas; Attendance: 31,919; Referee: Stéphane Lannoy

20 October 2007 11	Lyon	3–1	Monaco	Lyon
16:15 CEST	Juninho 12' (pen.); Réveillère 18'; Benzema 50'		Monsoreau 42'	Stadium: Stade de Gerland; Attendance: 36,254; Referee: Philippe Kalt

28 October 2007 12	Paris Saint-Germain	2–3	Lyon	Paris
21:00 CET	Pauleta 61', 90+1'		Ben Arfa 40', 43'; Anderson (red card) 51'; Govou 84'	Stadium: Parc des Princes; Attendance: 39,787; Referee: Laurent Duhamel

3 November 2007 13	Lyon	2–0	Valenciennes	Lyon
20:00 CET	Juninho 40'; Govou 87'			Stadium: Stade de Gerland; Attendance: 38,631; Referee: Alain Hamer

11 November 2007 14	Lyon	1–2	Marseille	Lyon
21:00 CET	Juninho 7'		Niang 10' (pen.), 43'	Stadium: Stade de Gerland; Attendance: 38,811; Referee: Bertrand Layec

24 November 2007 15	Rennes	0–2	Lyon	Rennes
17:10 CET			Juninho 5' (pen.); Ben Arfa 18'	Stadium: Stade de la Route de Lorient; Attendance: 28,596; Referee: Saïd Ennjimi

2 December 2007 16	Lyon	5–0	Strasbourg	Lyon
20:55 CET	Källström 13', 80' (pen.); Juninho 19'; Benzema 64'; Clerc 78'			Stadium: Stade de Gerland; Attendance: 34,595; Referee: Fredy Fautrel

8 December 2007 17	Caen	1–0	Lyon	Caen
20:00 CET	Gouffran 18'			Stadium: Stade Michel d'Ornano; Attendance: 20,664; Referee: Alain Hamer

15 December 2007 18	Lyon	0–0	Nice	Lyon
17:10 CET				Stadium: Stade de Gerland; Attendance: 37,280; Referee: Lionel Jaffredo

22 December 2007 19	Nancy	1–1	Lyon	Tomblaine
17:10 CET	Malonga 86'		Baroš 80'	Stadium: Stade Marcel Picot; Attendance: 19,898; Referee: Bertrand Layec

12 January 2008 20	Lyon	3–2	Toulouse	Lyon
20:00 CET	Ben Arfa 17'; Juninho 56'; Benzema 66'		Réveillère 9' (o.g.); Fabinho 90+3'	Stadium: Stade de Gerland; Attendance: 36,587; Referee: Hervé Piccirillo

20 January 2008 21	Lens	3–0	Lyon	Lens
20:55 CET	Maoulida 55'; Biševac 69'; Mangane 89'			Stadium: Stade Félix-Bollaert; Attendance: 32,734; Referee: Philippe Kalt

23 January 2008 22	Lyon	2–0	Lorient	Lyon
20:30 CET	Ben Arfa 29'; Benzema 74'			Stadium: Stade de Gerland; Attendance: 37,780; Referee: Damien Ledentu

27 January 2008 23	Saint-Étienne	1–1	Lyon	Saint-Étienne
20:55 CET	Gomis 45+2'		Benzema 90+2'	Stadium: Stade Geoffroy-Guichard; Attendance: 31,537; Referee: Bertrand Layec

9 February 2008 24	Lyon	4–1	Sochaux	Lyon
20:00 CET	Bodmer 2', 76'; Govou 90+1'; Benzema 90+3'		Pancrate 52'	Stadium: Stade de Gerland; Attendance: 35,909; Referee: Antony Gautier

16 February 2008 25	Le Mans	1–0	Lyon	Le Mans
17:10 CET	De Melo 70'			Stadium: Stade Léon-Bollée; Attendance: 14,015; Referee: Thierry Auriac

23 February 2008 26	Lyon	2–0	Metz	Lyon
20:00 CET	Fred 9', 68'			Stadium: Stade de Gerland; Attendance: 37,281; Referee: Saïd Ennjimi

1 March 2008 27	Lille	0–1	Lyon	Saint-Denis
17:10 CET			Fred 31'	Stadium: Stade de France; Attendance: 77,850; Referee: Alain Hamer

9 March 2008 28	Lyon	4–2	Bordeaux	Lyon
20:55 CET	Bodmer 12', 24'; Benzema 50'; Keita 90'		Wendel 35'; Cavenaghi 61' (pen.)	Stadium: Stade de Gerland; Attendance: 40,381; Referee: Stéphane Bré

15 March 2008 29	Monaco	0–3	Lyon	Monaco
16:00 CET			Keita 21', 37'; Fred 34'	Stadium: Stade Louis II; Attendance: 12,321; Referee: Stéphane Lannoy

23 March 2008 30	Lyon	4–2	Paris Saint-Germain	Lyon
20:55 CET	Fred 8', 36'; Govou 66'; Juninho 72'		Camara 45+2'; Rothen 51' (pen.)	Stadium: Stade de Gerland; Attendance: 37,895; Referee: Philippe Kalt

30 March 2008 31	Valenciennes	1–2	Lyon	Valenciennes
16:00 CEST	Chelle 27'		Keita 8'; Govou 65'	Stadium: Stade Nungesser; Attendance: 15,313; Referee: Bruno Coué

6 April 2008 32	Marseille	3–1	Lyon	Marseille
20:55 CEST	Cissé 26'; Niang 28', 54'		Cana 45' (o.g.)	Stadium: Stade Vélodrome; Attendance: 56,271; Referee: Fredy Fautrel

12 April 2008 33	Lyon	1–1	Rennes	Lyon
17:10 CEST	Cris 16'			Stadium: Stade de Gerland; Attendance: 39,900; Referee: Laurent Duhamel

19 April 2008 34	Strasbourg	1–2	Lyon	Strasbourg
20:00 CEST	Renteria 21'; Mouloungui (yellow card) 40' (yellow-red card) 45'		Bodmer 62'; Grosso 68'	Stadium: Stade de la Meinau; Attendance: 26,006; Referee: Saïd Ennjimi

26 April 2008 35	Lyon	2–2	Caen	Lyon
20:00 CEST	Benzema 33', 54'		Eluchans 37'; Compan 45'	Stadium: Stade de Gerland; Attendance: 39,068; Referee: Philippe Malige

3 May 2008 36	Nice	0–0	Lyon	Nice
17:10 CEST				Stadium: Stade du Ray; Attendance: 14,206; Referee: Jean-Charles Cailleux

10 May 2008 37	Lyon	1–0	Nancy	Lyon
20:45 CEST	André Luiz 61' (o.g.)			Stadium: Stade de Gerland; Attendance: 38,190; Referee: Thierry Auriac

17 May 2008 38	Auxerre	1–3	Lyon	Auxerre
20:50 CEST	Thomas 76'		Benzema 1'; Fred 10'; Källström 52'	Stadium: Stade de l'Abbé-Deschamps; Attendance: 19,799; Referee: Stéphane Bré

=== Coupe de France ===
Lyon got their Coupe de France season off to a strong start defeating Championnat National side Créteil 4–0, with Karim Benzema picking up a hat-trick. This match was notable as it marked the return of Lyon goalkeeper Grégory Coupet who had been out for four months with a torn medial ligament. Following their Round of 32 success, they were pitted against the surprising, yet upset-minded CFA side Croix de Savoie. After a hard-fought first half, it took an 80th-minute strike from Fred to pull Lyon through to the next round where they faced the defending champions Sochaux. Following an unimpressive first half from both clubs, Benzema opened the scoring for Lyon in the 56th minute. After holding the score at 1–0, Lyon failed to keep a clean sheet as Kandia Traoré equalised for Sochaux near the beginning of injury time. With extra time looming, Benzema again scored for Lyon to give them the victory and the right to move to the quarter-finals, where they faced relegation-bound Metz.

Metz, looking to create something special out of a disappointing league season, played very bravely as they tried to pull off a historic upset. Benzema, however, again scored for Lyon (his 28th of the season and sixth in the Coupe de France) to give them a 1–0 lead in the 39th minute. That would be the eventual scoreline as Lyon advanced to the semifinals where they faced Ligue 2 side Sedan. In one of the more entertaining matches of the cup, with both teams displaying their attacking prowess and both goalkeepers stepping up in times of need, it took one of Juninho's vintage free kicks to finally knock out the tough Ligue 2 side and thus book Lyon's place in the final at the Stade de France, where they faced rivals Paris Saint-Germain. The final was heavily contested and eventually headed into extra time. Lyon finally broke through with a goal from Sidney Govou. Lyon would hold on to that scoreline as they prevailed to capture their fourth Coupe de France title in their history and the first in the Jean-Michel Aulas era.

==== Matches ====
6 January 2008 Round of 64	Créteil	0–4	Lyon	Créteil
18:00 CET			Benzema 13', 37', 79' (pen.); Juninho 44'	Stadium: Stade Dominique-Duvauchelle; Attendance: 10,640; Referee: Jean-Charles Cailleux

3 February 2008 Round of 32	Croix de Savoie	0–1	Lyon	Thonon-les-Bains
16:00 CET			Fred 80'	Stadium: Stade Joseph Moynat; Attendance: 7,500; Referee: Bruno Coué

18 March 2008 Round of 16	Lyon	2–1	Sochaux	Lyon
21:00 CET	Benzema 56', 90+1'		Traoré 90'	Stadium: Stade de Gerland; Attendance: 20,012; Referee: Fredy Fautrel

15 April 2008 Quarter-finals	Lyon	1–0	Metz	Lyon
20:45 CEST	Benzema 38'			Stadium: Stade de Gerland; Attendance: 27,015; Referee: Hervé Piccirillo

7 May 2008 Semi-finals	Lyon	1–0	Sedan	Lyon
21:00 CEST	Juninho 87'			Stadium: Stade de Gerland; Attendance: 33,057; Referee: Bertrand Layec

24 May 2008 Final	Lyon	1–0 (a.e.t.)	Paris Saint-Germain	Saint-Denis
21:00 CEST	Govou 103'			Stadium: Stade de France; Attendance: 79,204; Referee: Philippe Kalt

=== Coupe de la Ligue ===
Lyon entered this year's edition of the Coupe de la Ligue as the defending runners-up after losing to Bordeaux in the 2007 final. Having made it to the Champions League, Lyon were given their annual bye into the first knockout round, where they defeated Caen 3–1. With that win, they were pitted against Le Mans in the quarter-finals. After an early goal by Le Mans midfielder Daisuke Matsui, Lyon could not break through their sturdy defence as they bowed out of the League Cup for the seventh-straight season, their last cup triumph being in 2001.

==== Matches ====
31 October 2007 Round of 16	Caen	1–3	Lyon	Caen
21:00 CET	Grandin 30'		Keita 14'; Bodmer 76'; Benzema 89'	Stadium: Stade Michel d'Ornano; Attendance: 16,336; Referee: Damien Ledentu

16 January 2008 Quarter-finals	Le Mans	1–0	Lyon	Le Mans
15:00 CET	Matsui 29'			Stadium: Stade Léon-Bollée; Attendance: 7,934; Referee: Fredy Fautrel

=== UEFA Champions League ===
Lyon made their seventh-straight appearance in the UEFA Champions League. They were pitted in the so-called "group of death", which featured German champions VfB Stuttgart, Spanish giants Barcelona and Scottish giants Rangers. After two disappointing 0–3 losses to Barcelona at the Camp Nou and Rangers at home, Lyon rebounded picking up two important wins in their home-away series against Stuttgart. Following their 2–2 draw at home against Barcelona, Lyon faced a tough challenge as they needed to defeat Rangers at Ibrox in order to advance to the knockout stages. As Rangers only needed a draw, odds were against Lyon. However, after an early goal by Sidney Govou, Lyon ended Rangers hope with two late goals from Karim Benzema sending Lyon to the knockout stages for the fifth consecutive season.

==== Group stage ====
Pos	Team	Pld	W	D	L	GF	GA	GD	Pts	Qualification
1	(Spain) Barcelona	6	4	2	0	12	3	+9	14	Advance to knockout stage
2	(France) Lyon	6	3	1	2	11	10	+1	10	Advance to knockout stage
3	(Scotland) Rangers	6	2	1	3	7	9	−2	7	Transfer to UEFA Cup
4	(Germany) VfB Stuttgart	6	1	0	5	7	15	−8	3	

Source: RSSSF

19 September 2007 1	Barcelona (Spain)	3–0	(France) Lyon	Barcelona, Spain
20:45	Clerc 22' (o.g.); Messi 82'; Henry 90+1'	Report		Stadium: Camp Nou; Attendance: 78,689; Referee: Massimo Busacca (Switzerland)

2 October 2007 2	Lyon (France)	0–3	(Scotland) Rangers	Lyon, France
20:45		Report	McCulloch 23'; Cousin 48'; Beasley 53'	Stadium: Stade de Gerland; Attendance: 38,076; Referee: Tom Henning Øvrebø (Norway)

23 October 2007 3	Stuttgart (Germany)	0–2	(France) Lyon	Stuttgart, Germany
20:45		Report	Santos 55'; Benzema 79'	Stadium: Gottlieb-Daimler-Stadion; Attendance: 51,000; Referee: Lucílio Batista (Portugal)

7 November 2007 4	Lyon (France)	4–2	(Germany) Stuttgart	Lyon, France
20:45	Ben Arfa 5', 37'; Källström 15'; Juninho 90'	Report	Gómez 16', 56'	Stadium: Stade de Gerland; Attendance: 38,215; Referee: Yuri Baskakov (Russia)

27 November 2007 5	Lyon (France)	2–2	(Spain) Barcelona	Lyon, France
20:45	Juninho 7', 80' (pen.)	Report	Iniesta 3'; Messi 58' (pen.)	Stadium: Stade de Gerland; Attendance: 36,500; Referee: Stefano Farina (Italy)

12 December 2007 6	Rangers (Scotland)	0–3	(France) Lyon	Glasgow, Scotland
20:45		Report	Govou 16'; Benzema 85', 88'	Stadium: Ibrox Stadium; Attendance: 50,260; Referee: Ľuboš Micheľ (Slovakia)

==== Knockout phase ====
===== Round of 16 =====
20 February 2008 First leg	Lyon (France)	1–1	(England) Manchester United	Lyon, France
20:45	Benzema 54'	Report	Tevez 87'	Stadium: Stade de Gerland; Attendance: 39,219; Referee: Luis Medina Cantalejo (Spain)

4 March 2008 Second leg	Manchester United (England)	1–0 (2–1 agg.)	(France) Lyon	Manchester, England
20:45	Ronaldo 41'	Report		Stadium: Old Trafford; Attendance: 75,520; Referee: Roberto Rosetti (Italy)

== Statistics ==
Last updated on 24 May 2008.

No.	Pos	Nat	Player	Total		Ligue 1		Champions League		Coupe de la Ligue		Coupe de France	
No.	Pos	Nat	Player	Apps	Goals	Apps	Goals	Apps	Goals	Apps	Goals	Apps	Goals
1	GK	(France) FRA	Grégory Coupet	28	0	19	0	2	0	1	0	6	0
2	DF	(France) FRA	François Clerc	40	1	21+7	1	4+3	0	0	0	5	0
3	DF	(Brazil) BRA	Cris	17	1	13	1	1	0	0	0	3	0
4	DF	(Switzerland) SUI	Patrick Müller	1	0	1	0	0	0	0	0	0	0
5	MF	(France) FRA	Mathieu Bodmer	51	7	30+8	6	2+3	0	2	1	6	0
6	MF	(Sweden) SWE	Kim Källström	54	6	29+9	5	7+1	1	2	0	6	0
8	MF	(Brazil) BRA	Juninho	47	13	30+3	8	8	3	2	0	4	2
9	FW	(Brazil) BRA	Fred	31	8	14+8	7	1+2	0	2	0	4	1
10	FW	(France) FRA	Karim Benzema	52	31	33+4	20	7	4	2	1	6	6
11	DF	(Italy) ITA	Fabio Grosso	44	1	31	1	7	0	1	0	5	0
14	FW	(France) FRA	Sidney Govou	45	9	26+6	7	8	1	1	0	4	1
18	MF	(France) FRA	Hatem Ben Arfa	43	8	18+13	6	5+3	2	1	0	3	0
19	FW	(Argentina) ARG	César Delgado	10	0	2+6	0	0	0	0	0	2	0
20	DF	(France) FRA	Anthony Réveillère	40	1	22+6	1	6+1	0	2	0	3	0
21	MF	(Spain) ESP	Marc Crosas	12	0	4+5	0	0	0	0	0	3	0
22	DF	(Brazil) BRA	Anderson	19	1	11+1	1	5	0	1	0	1	0
23	FW	(Ivory Coast) CIV	Kader Keïta	41	5	19+11	4	0+6	0	1	1	4	0
24	MF	(France) FRA	Romain Beynié	0	0	0	0	0	0	0	0	0	0
25	GK	(France) FRA	Joan Hartock	0	0	0	0	0	0	0	0	0	0
27	FW	(France) FRA	Anthony Mounier	1	0	0+1	0	0	0	0	0	0	0
28	MF	(France) FRA	Jérémy Toulalan	41	0	30+1	0	5	0	1	0	4	0
29	DF	(France) FRA	Sébastien Squillaci	50	0	35+1	0	8	0	2	0	4	0
30	GK	(France) FRA	Rémy Vercoutre	26	0	19	0	6	0	1	0	0	0
32	DF	(France) FRA	Jean-Alain Boumsong	13	0	8	0	1	0	0	0	4	0
33	DF	(France) FRA	Mickael Charvet	0	0	0	0	0	0	0	0	0	0
35	GK	(France) FRA	Frédéric Roux	1	0	0	0	1	0	0	0	0	0
