= Frédéric Roux =

French footballer (born 1973)

Personal information
- Full name: Frederic Alain Roux
- Date of birth: 27 June 1973 (age 53)
- Place of birth: Nancy, France
- Height: 1.88 m (6 ft 2 in)
- Position: Goalkeeper

Senior career*
Years	Team	Apps	(Gls)
1995–2000	Nancy	77	(0)
1999–2000	→ Châteauroux (loan)	36	(0)
2000–2006	Bordeaux	19	(0)
2006–2007	Ajaccio	34	(0)
2007–2008	Lyon	0	(0)
Total		166	(0)
- * Club domestic league appearances and goals

Frederic Alain Roux (born 27 June 1973) is a French former professional footballer who played as a goalkeeper. His previous clubs include Nancy, Châteauroux, Bordeaux, where he won the Coupe de la Ligue in 2002, and Ajaccio.

== Career statistics ==
Appearances and goals by club, season and competition
Club	Season	League			National cup		League cup		Europe		Other		Total	
Club	Season	Division	Apps	Goals	Apps	Goals	Apps	Goals	Apps	Goals	Apps	Goals	Apps	Goals
Nancy	1989–90	Division 2	0	0	0	0	—		—		0	0	0	0
Nancy	1990–91	Division 1	0	0	0	0	—		—		—		0	0
Nancy	1991–92	Division 1	0	0	0	0	—		—		—		2	0
Nancy	1992–93	Division 2	0	0	0	0	—		—		—		0	0
Nancy	1993–94	Division 2	3	0	0	0	—		—		—		3	0
Nancy	1994–95	Division 2	0	0	0	0	0	0	—		—		0	0
Nancy	1995–96	Division 2	2	0	1	0	0	0	—		—		3	0
Nancy	1996–97	Division 1	2	0	0	0	1	0	—		—		3	0
Nancy	1997–98	Division 2	40	0	4	0	3	0	—		—		47	0
Nancy	1998–99	Division 1	30	0	0	0	0	0	—		—		30	0
Nancy	Total		77	0	5	0	4	0	—		0	0	86	0
Châteauroux (loan)	1999–2000	Division 2	36	0	0	0	1	0	—		—		37	0
Bordeaux	2000–01	Division 1	0	0	0	0	0	0	3	0	—		3	0
Bordeaux	2001–02	Division 1	0	0	1	0	5	0	1	0	—		8	0
Bordeaux	2002–03	Ligue 1	11	0	1	0	2	0	0	0	—		14	0
Bordeaux	2003–04	Ligue 1	3	0	0	0	1	0	0	0	—		4	0
Bordeaux	2004–05	Ligue 1	1	0	1	0	1	0	—		—		3	0
Bordeaux	2005–06	Ligue 1	4	0	2	0	0	0	—		—		6	0
Bordeaux	Total		19	0	5	0	7	0	4	0	—		35	0
Ajaccio	2006–07	Ligue 2	34	0	2	0	1	0	—		—		37	0
Lyon	2007–08	Ligue 1	0	0	0	0	0	0	0	0	—		0	0
Career total			166	0	12	0	13	0	4	0	0	0	195	0

== Honours ==
Nancy

- Division 2: 1998

Bordeaux

- Coupe de la Ligue: 2002

Lyon

- Coupe de France: 2008
- Ligue 1: 2008
