= Ricardo Silva (footballer, born 1975) =

Portuguese footballer

Personal information
- Full name: Ricardo Emídio Ramalho da Silva
- Date of birth: 26 September 1975 (age 51)
- Place of birth: Porto, Portugal
- Height: 1.88 m (6 ft 2 in)
- Position: Centre-back

Youth career
- 1987–1995: Boavista

Senior career*
Years	Team	Apps	(Gls)
1995–2003	Porto	18	(4)
1995–1996	→ Esposende (loan)	29	(6)
1996–1997	→ Felgueiras (loan)	30	(14)
1997–1998	→ Marítimo (loan)	23	(1)
1998–1999	→ União Leiria (loan)	28	(1)
2000–2002	Porto B	3	(1)
2002–2003	→ Vitória Guimarães (loan)	28	(2)
2003–2004	Boavista	19	(1)
2005	Beira-Mar	17	(0)
2005–2008	Boavista	61	(5)
2008–2009	Shinnik	58	(7)
2010–2013	Vitória Setúbal	70	(2)
2013–2014	Boavista	28	(0)
2014−2015	Padroense	7	(0)
Total		419	(44)

International career
1997	Portugal U21	4	(1)
2000–2003	Portugal B	5	(0)

Managerial career
- 2018: Varzim
- * Club domestic league appearances and goals

Ricardo Emídio Ramalho da Silva (born 26 September 1975; Portuguese pronunciation: [ʁiˈkaɾðu ˈsilvɐ]) is a Portuguese former professional footballer who played as a central defender.

He amassed Primeira Liga totals of 264 matches and 16 goals in 15 seasons, representing in the competition Porto, Marítimo, União de Leiria, Vitória de Guimarães, Boavista, Beira-Mar and Vitória de Setúbal.

== Club career ==
A Boavista F.C. youth graduate who was born in Porto, Silva was bought in 1995 by neighbouring FC Porto, where he would be loaned constantly during his contract, mostly to mid-table clubs in the Primeira Liga, his beginnings being with AD Esposende in the third division. From 1999 to 2002 he was part of Porto's first-team, but his starting XI opportunities were rare; for the 2002–03 season he was loaned for the fifth and last time, to Vitória de Guimarães.

Silva returned to Boavista in summer 2003, where he knew his most steady period, playing there for four out of five campaigns (the second half of 2004–05 was spent at S.C. Beira-Mar, also in the top flight). Although almost never an undisputed starter, he did figure prominently.

In February 2008, Silva moved to Russia with FC Shinnik Yaroslavl, being signed at the same time as his compatriot Bruno Basto who arrived from C.D. Nacional. In January 2010 the 34-year-old agreed on a return to his country, joining struggling Vitória F.C. until the end of the season, with the Sadinos eventually finishing in 14th position, the first team above the relegation zone; he later took the club to court due to unpaid wages.

== International career ==
Silva represented Portugal at under-21 and B levels.

== Honours ==
Porto

- Taça de Portugal: 1999–2000, 2000–01
