= Kodjo Afanou =

French footballer (born 1977)

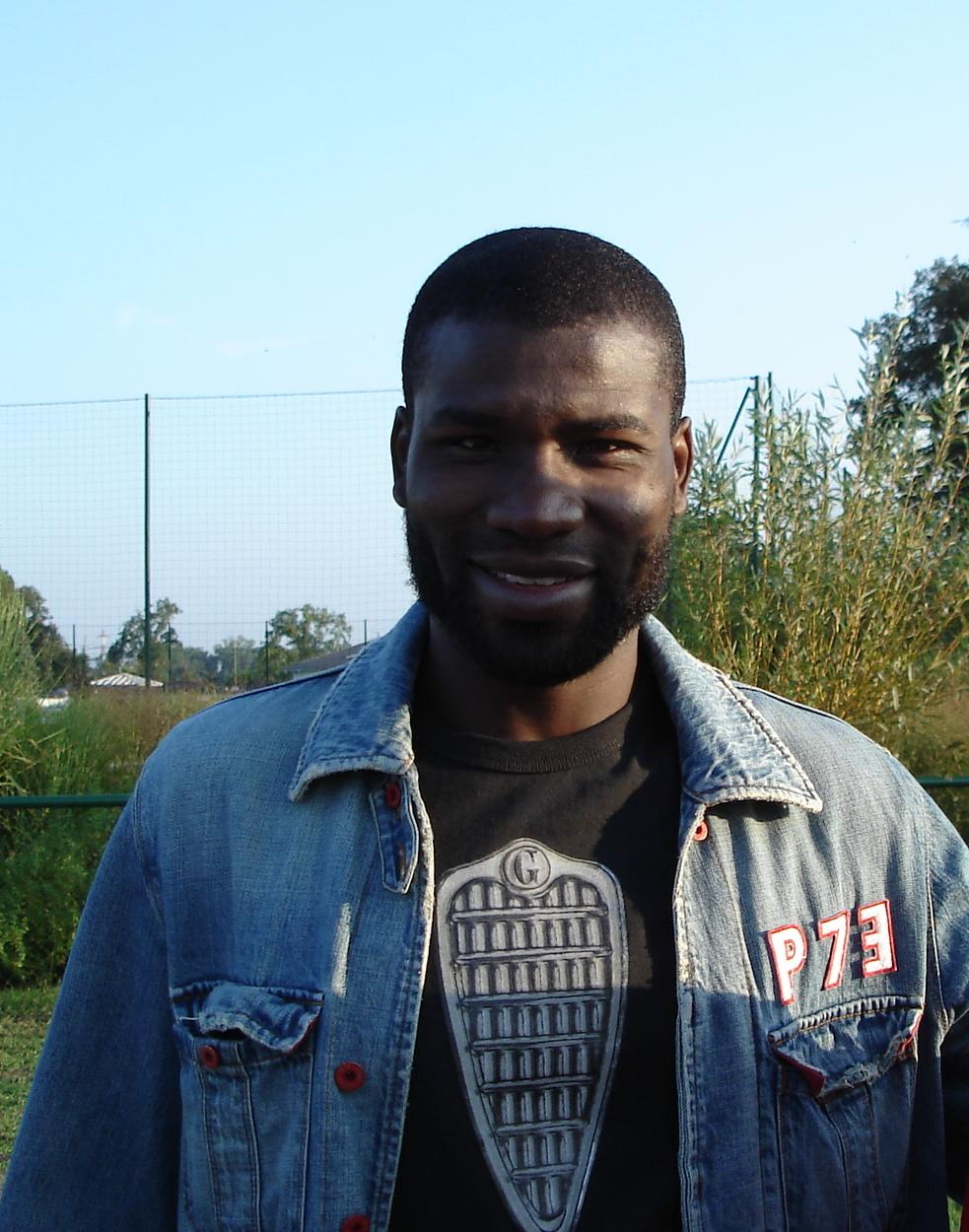

Personal information
- Full name: Kodjo Julien Afanou
- Date of birth: 21 November 1977 (age 48)
- Place of birth: Tabligbo, Togo
- Height: 1.80 m (5 ft 11 in)
- Position: Defender

Youth career
- 1992–1996: Bordeaux

Senior career*
Years	Team	Apps	(Gls)
1996–2006	Bordeaux	194	(4)
2004–2005	→ Al Ain FC (loan	?	(?)
2006–2007	Al-Faisaly	?	(0)
2007–2008	Gaziantepspor	17	(0)
2008–2009	Al Hazm	8	(0)

International career
1997	France U-21	12	(1)
- * Club domestic league appearances and goals

Kodjo Afanou (born 21 November 1977) is a French former professional footballer who played as a defender.

== Club career ==
Born in Tabligbo, Togo, Afanou moved to France at a young age. He started his career at Girondins de Bordeaux. He made 194 appearances for the club in 10 Ligue 1 seasons, 21 appearances in UEFA Cup and 10 appearances in UEFA Champions League. In his time at Bordeaux he won Ligue 1 in the 1998–99 season and the 2001–02 Coupe de la Ligue. He left the club in February 2006. He was without a club for a year, before joining Gaziantepspor in January 2007. Afanou was released in January 2008, before joining for Al-Hazm in Saudi Arabia.

== International career ==
Afanou was capped for France at U-20 level, playing 1997 FIFA World Youth Championship.
