= Mickaël Charvet =

French footballer (born 1988)

Personal information
- Date of birth: 31 March 1988 (age 38)
- Place of birth: Bourg en Bresse, France
- Height: 1.79 m (5 ft 10 in)
- Position: Centre-back

Youth career
- 2003–2008: Lyon

Senior career*
Years	Team	Apps	(Gls)
2005–2008	Lyon II	27	(0)
2007–2008	Lyon	0	(0)
2009–2012	Ajaccio	4	(0)
2010–2011	→ Gap (loan)	39	(1)
2012–2013	Paris FC	26	(0)
2012–2013	Paris FC II	2	(0)
2013–2014	Stade Montois	14	(0)
2014–2016	Monts d'Or Azergues	56	(1)
2016–2018	Lyon-Duchère	48	(0)
2018–2019	Monts d'Or Azergues	24	(0)
2020–2021	Saint-Priest	8	(1)
2021–2022	Saint-Cyr Collonges		
- * Club domestic league appearances and goals as of 14 October 2020

Mickaël Charvet (born 31 March 1988) is a French professional footballer who plays as a centre-back.

== Career ==
Charvet started his career at Lyon, playing for the reserve team. He did not play for the first team, but made the bench for the first time in Lyon's Coupe de la Ligue match again Caen on 31 October 2007. He joined Ajaccio in 2008, but was not used much during his five seasons at the club. He spent the 2010–11 season on loan at the now-defunct Gap FC.

After an initial trial at the club, Charvet joined Paris FC in August 2012. He signed a one-year contract, which had a one-year extension clause should Paris FC remain in Championnat National at the end of the 2012–13 season. However, the club finished in 17th, the final relegation position, and were only reprieved due to the administrative relegation of Rouen. A legal dispute followed.

Charvet almost signed for Apollon Limassol after leaving Paris FC, but contractual problems stopped the move. He signed for Stade Montois in February 2014. At the start of the 2014–15 season he moved to Monts d'Or Azergues Foot for the first time.

In August 2016, after two seasons playing every league game for Mont d'Or Azergues, he joined Lyon Duchère. After two seasons, he left and rejoined Monts d'Or Azergues for the 2018–19 season. He left the club by the end of the season.

In June 2020, Charvet joined Saint-Priest.
