= Aleksei Kosonogov =

Russian footballer (born 1982)

Personal information
- Full name: Aleksei Ivanovich Kosonogov
- Date of birth: 30 March 1982 (age 44)
- Place of birth: Vyksa, Russian SFSR
- Height: 1.81 m (5 ft 11 in)
- Position: Forward

Senior career*
Years	Team	Apps	(Gls)
1997	FC Metallurg Vyksa	2	(0)
1997–1999	FK Kareda Šiauliai	3	(0)
1999–2005	Bordeaux	0	(0)
1999–2002	→ Bordeaux B	11	(5)
2002–2003	→ US Créteil-Lusitanos (loan)	20	(2)
2003–2005	→ Bordeaux B	7	(4)
2006	FC Spartak Kostroma	7	(2)
2006–2007	Tours FC	6	(0)
2007–2008	FC Ryazan	30	(10)
2008	FC Volga Ulyanovsk	7	(0)
2010	FC Metallurg Vyksa (amateur)		
2011	FC Spartak Tambov	9	(1)
2012–2014	FC Metallurg Vyksa	33	(1)

International career
1998	Russia U-17	1	(0)
2000	Russia U-21	2	(0)
- * Club domestic league appearances and goals

Aleksei Ivanovich Kosonogov (Russian: Алексей Иванович Косоногов; born 30 March 1982) is a Russian former professional footballer.

== Club career ==
He played in the Russian Football National League for FC Volga Ulyanovsk in 2008.
