= Bruno Basto =

Portuguese footballer (born 1978)

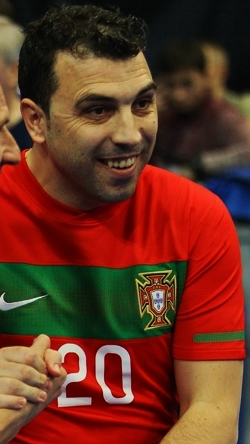
- Basto in 2015

Personal information
- Full name: Bruno Miguel Leite Basto
- Date of birth: 21 May 1978 (age 48)
- Place of birth: Lisbon, Portugal
- Height: 1.75 m (5 ft 9 in)
- Position: Left-back

Youth career
- 1989–1996: Benfica

Senior career*
Years	Team	Apps	(Gls)
1996–1997	Alverca	37	(1)
1998–2000	Benfica	48	(1)
2000–2004	Bordeaux	115	(0)
2004–2005	Feyenoord	18	(1)
2006	Saint-Étienne	8	(0)
2006–2007	Nacional	12	(0)
2008–2009	Shinnik	14	(0)
Total		252	(3)

International career
1993–1994	Portugal U16	15	(0)
1995–1996	Portugal U17	4	(0)
1995–1996	Portugal U18	13	(1)
1996–1998	Portugal U20	9	(0)
1997–1999	Portugal U21	15	(0)
2000	Portugal B	2	(0)
- * Club domestic league appearances and goals

Bruno Miguel Leite Basto (born 21 May 1978) is a Portuguese former professional footballer who played as a left-back.

After starting out at Benfica, he went on to play in France, the Netherlands and Russia, notably totalling 144 appearances for Bordeaux.

== Club career ==
Born in Lisbon, Basto was a graduate of hometown S.L. Benfica's youth system, and began playing professionally with its farm team, F.C. Alverca, being recalled for good in January 1998. After some good performances, he began an abroad spell that would last six years, four seasons at FC Girondins de Bordeaux, one and a half at Feyenoord and six months at AS Saint-Étienne, with relative success – he only managed to be first-choice for the first of those clubs.

In the 2001–02 campaign, Basto helped Girondins to finish sixth in Ligue 1, with the side also qualifying for the UEFA Cup after winning the Coupe de la Ligue, defeating FC Lorient 3–0 in the final with two goals from his compatriot Pauleta. He returned to Portugal in 2006–07, signing with C.D. Nacional; he was played very rarely in Madeira however, mainly due weight problems, and left for Russia's FC Shinnik Yaroslavl in the 2008 January transfer window, where he teamed up with countryman Ricardo Silva.

In summer 2010, after not being able to find a club in more than one year, Basto retired at the age of 32. Subsequently, he worked as a sports agent.

== International career ==
Basto earned caps for Portugal at youth and B levels.

== Honours ==
Bordeaux

- Coupe de la Ligue: 2001–02
