= Juan Pablo Francia =

Argentine football playmaker

Personal information
- Full name: Juan Pablo Francia
- Date of birth: 3 December 1984 (age 41)
- Place of birth: San Francisco, Argentina
- Height: 1.79 m (5 ft 10 in)
- Position: Attacking midfielder

Youth career
- Sportivo Belgrano

Senior career*
Years	Team	Apps	(Gls)
2000–2002	Sportivo Belgrano	6	(0)
2002–2008	Bordeaux	88	(11)
2008–2015	Sportivo Belgrano	198	(49)
2015	Talleres de Córdoba	21	(1)
2016–2021	Sportivo Belgrano	112	(15)
- * Club domestic league appearances and goals

Juan Pablo Francia (born 3 December 1984 in San Francisco, Córdoba) is an Argentine former footballer who played as an Attacking Midfielder. He began his senior career with Sportivo Belgrano. He is best known for his passing and eye for goal.

== Career ==
Born on 3 December 1984, Francia began his career with Sportivo Belgrano in the regional leagues in Córdoba. His good technical ability, good shooting and his goalscoring ability attracted the attention of European scouts.

After rejecting an offer from Benfica, he joined Bordeaux and worked his way through the youth team making his competitive debut in a 2–1 defeat by Nantes on the last day of the 2001–2002 season, on 4 May 2002. He played more than 80 games and scored 13 goals, winning the Coupe de la Ligue in the 2006–07 season.

Before the 2007–08 season with Bordeaux, he returned to his hometown of San Francisco, Argentina. Years later, Francia said that he returned because he missed his family and friends, adding that “not everything in life is about money” and that he had no regrets of that decision.

After almost a year without playing due to Bordeaux's delay in clearing his transfer to Sportivo Belgrano, Francia played his first official match for the club on 27 September 2008, during the opening match of the 2008–2009 Torneo Argentino B season in a 2–0 defeat against 9 de Julio de Morteros. With "La Verde", Francia achieved the promotion, in June 2009, to the Torneo Argentino A. He played a total of 33 matches and scored 11 goals, finishing as his team's top scorer alongside Lucas "Tecla" Farías.

On 30 June 2013, Francia achieved the promotion to the Torneo Nacional B for the first time in the club history. Throughout the season, Francia played 38 games and scored a total of 13 goals, being the second highest-scorer for the squad led by Carlos Mazzola.

After seven years playing for Sportivo Belgrano, Francia joined Talleres de Córdoba in 2015 to play the Torneo Federal A, reaching the promotion to the Nacional B at the end of the season.

The same year he reached the promotion with Talleres, he returned to Sportivo Belgrano motivated by the desire to help his club after suffering the relegation to the Torneo Federal A. He played for Sportivo Belgrano again on 15 February 2016, in the 1–0 defeat against Gutiérrez Sport Club de Mendoza.

Francia played his last official match on 17 October 2021, against Gimnasia y Tiro de Salta in a match that ended 1-1.

== Legacy ==
Francia is regarded as the greatest player in the history of Sportivo Belgrano. After his retirement, the club named its stadium after him in recognition of his contribution and status as one of its greatest idols.

Overall, Francia made 321 total appearances and scored 65 goals for Sportivo Belgrano in league and cup competitions.

== Personal life ==
Francia holds both Argentine and Italian nationality.
