= 2005–06 FC Girondins de Bordeaux season =

Bordeaux
2005–06 season
- President: Jean-Louis Triaud
- Head coach: Ricardo Gomes
- Stadium: Stade Chaban-Delmas
- Ligue 1: 2nd
- Coupe de France: Round of 16
- Coupe de la Ligue: Quarter-finals
- Average home league attendance: 23,939
Home colours	Away colours	Third colours

The 2005–06 season is the 125th season in the existence of FC Girondins de Bordeaux and the club's 44th consecutive season in the top-flight of French football. In addition to the domestic league, Bordeaux participated in this season's editions of the Coupe de France and Coupe de la Ligue.

== Pre-season and friendlies ==
Win Draw Loss Fixtures

== Competitions ==
=== Overview ===
Competition	First match	Last match	Starting round	Final position	Record							
Competition	First match	Last match	Starting round	Final position	Pld	W	D	L	GF	GA	GD	Win %
Ligue 1	30 July 2005	13 May 2006	Matchday 1	2nd	38	18	15	5	43	25	+18	47.37
Coupe de France	7 January 2006	22 March 2006	Round of 64	Round of 16	3	2	0	1	5	3	+2	66.67
Coupe de la Ligue	26 October 2005	17 January 2006	Second round	Quarter-finals	3	2	0	1	5	3	+2	66.67
Total					44	22	15	7	53	31	+22	50.00

Source: Competitions

=== Ligue 1 ===
==== League table ====
Pos	Team	Pld	W	D	L	GF	GA	GD	Pts	Qualification or relegation
1	Lyon (C)	38	25	9	4	73	31	+42	84	Qualification to Champions League group stage
2	Bordeaux	38	18	15	5	43	25	+18	69	Qualification to Champions League group stage
3	Lille	38	16	14	8	56	31	+25	62	Qualification to Champions League third qualifying round
4	Lens	38	14	18	6	48	34	+14	60	Qualification to UEFA Cup first round
5	Marseille	38	16	12	10	44	35	+9	60	Qualification to Intertoto Cup third round

Source: Ligue 1
Rules for classification: 1) points; 2) goal difference; 3) number of goals scored.
(C) Champions

==== Results summary ====
Overall								Home						Away					
Pld	W	D	L	GF	GA	GD	Pts	W	D	L	GF	GA	GD	W	D	L	GF	GA	GD
38	18	15	5	43	25	+18	69	11	7	1	23	11	+12	7	8	4	20	14	+6

Source: Ligue 1

==== Results by round ====
Round	1	2	3	4	5	6	7	8	9	10	11	12	13	14	15	16	17	18	19	20	21	22	23	24	25	26	27	28	29	30	31	32	33	34	35	36	37	38
Ground	A	H	A	H	A	A	H	A	H	A	H	A	H	A	H	A	H	A	H	A	H	A	H	H	A	H	A	H	A	H	A	H	A	H	A	H	A	H
Result	W	W	L	W	D	D	D	D	W	W	D	D	W	W	L	D	W	L	D	D	W	W	W	W	D	W	W	D	W	W	D	W	L	D	L	D	W	D
Position	3	3	5	4	4	5	7	6	3	3	3	3	2	2	3	3	3	3	3	6	2	2	2	2	2	2	2	2	2	2	2	2	2	2	2	2	2	2

Source: Ligue 1
A = Away; H = Home; W = Win; D = Draw; L = Loss

==== Matches ====
30 July 2005 1	Marseille	0–2	Bordeaux	Marseille
17:15 CEST (UTC+2)		Report		Stadium: Stade Vélodrome

6 August 2005 2	Bordeaux	1–0	Nancy	Bordeaux
20:00 CEST (UTC+2)		Report		Stadium: Stade Chaban-Delmas

13 August 2006 3	Auxerre	1–0	Bordeaux	Auxerre
20:00 CEST (UTC+2)		Report		Stadium: Stade de l'Abbé-Deschamps

20 August 2005 4	Bordeaux	1–0	Monaco	Bordeaux
17:15 CEST (UTC+2)		Report		Stadium: Stade Chaban-Delmas

27 August 2005 5	Strasbourg	0–0	Bordeaux	Strasbourg
20:00 CEST (UTC+2)		Report		Stadium: Stade de la Meinau

11 September 2005 6	Lens	1–1	Bordeaux	Lens
18:00 CEST (UTC+2)		Report		Stadium: Stade Bollaert-Delelis; Referee: Philippe Kalt

17 September 2005 7	Bordeaux	1–1	Lyon	Bordeaux
17:15 CEST (UTC+2)		Report		Stadium: Stade Chaban-Delmas; Referee: Bruno Derrien

21 September 2005 8	Rennes	2–2	Bordeaux	Rennes
20:30 CEST (UTC+2)		Report		Stadium: Stade de la Route de Lorient; Referee: Philippe Malige

24 September 2005 9	Bordeaux	1–0	Ajaccio	Bordeaux
20:00 CEST (UTC+2)		Report		Stadium: Stade Chaban-Delmas; Referee: Éric Poulat

1 October 2005 10	Metz	0–1	Bordeaux	Metz
20:00 CEST (UTC+2)		Report		Stadium: Stade Saint-Symphorien; Referee: Damien Ledentu

15 October 2005 11	Bordeaux	1–1	Sochaux	Bordeaux
20:00 CEST (UTC+2)		Report		Stadium: Stade Chaban-Delmas; Referee: Tony Chapron

22 October 2005 12	Toulouse	1–1	Bordeaux	Toulouse
20:00 CEST (UTC+2)		Report		Stadium: Stadium de Toulouse; Referee: Jean-Paul Chaudre

29 October 2005 13	Bordeaux	2–0	Troyes	Bordeaux
20:00 CEST (UTC+2)		Report		Stadium: Stade Chaban-Delmas; Referee: Fredy Fautrel

5 November 2005 14	Nice	0–1	Bordeaux	Nice
20:00 CET (UTC+1)		Report		Stadium: Stade du Ray; Referee: Éric Poulat

20 November 2005 15	Bordeaux	0–2	Paris Saint-Germain	Bordeaux
20:45 CET (UTC+1)		Report		Stadium: Stade Chaban-Delmas; Referee: Bruno Coué

26 November 2005 16	Saint-Étienne	1–1	Bordeaux	Saint-Étienne
17:15 CET (UTC+1)		Report		Stadium: Stade Geoffroy-Guichard; Referee: Bertrand Layec

3 December 2005 17	Bordeaux	1–0	Lille	Bordeaux
20:00 CET (UTC+1)		Report		Stadium: Stade Chaban-Delmas; Referee: Claude Colombo

10 December 2006 18	Le Mans	1–0	Bordeaux	Le Mans
20:00 CET (UTC+1)		Report		Stadium: Stade Léon-Bollée

17 December 2005 19	Bordeaux	0–0	Nantes	Bordeaux
20:00 CET (UTC+1)		Report		Stadium: Stade Chaban-Delmas; Referee: Éric Poulat

4 January 2006 20	Nancy	0–0	Bordeaux	Tomblaine
20:30 CET (UTC+1)		Report		Stadium: Stade Marcel Picot; Referee: Patrick Lhermite

11 January 2006 21	Bordeaux	1–0	Auxerre	Bordeaux
18:15 CET (UTC+1)		Report		Stadium: Stade Chaban-Delmas; Referee: Stéphane Lannoy

14 January 2006 22	Monaco	0–1	Bordeaux	Monaco
20:00 CET (UTC+1)		Report		Stadium: Stade Louis II; Referee: Pascal Galibert

21 January 2006 23	Bordeaux	2–1	Strasbourg	Bordeaux
20:00 CET (UTC+1)		Report		Stadium: Stade Chaban-Delmas; Referee: Saïd Ennjimi

28 January 2006 24	Bordeaux	1–0	Lens	Bordeaux
17:15 CET (UTC+1)		Report		Stadium: Stade Chaban-Delmas; Referee: Hervé Piccirillo

5 February 2006 25	Lyon	0–0	Bordeaux	Lyon
21:00 CET (UTC+1)		Report		Stadium: Stade de Gerland; Referee: Stéphane Bré

11 February 2006 26	Bordeaux	2–0	Rennes	Bordeaux
20:00 CET (UTC+1)		Report		Stadium: Stade Chaban-Delmas; Referee: Marcel Lainé

18 February 2006 27	Sochaux	0–2	Bordeaux	Montbéliard
20:00 CET (UTC+1)		Report		Stadium: Stade Auguste Bonal

25 February 2006 28	Bordeaux	3–3	Metz	Bordeaux
20:00 CET (UTC+1)		Report		Stadium: Stade Chaban-Delmas; Referee: Philippe Kalt

11 March 2006 30	Bordeaux	2–0	Toulouse	Bordeaux
20:00 CET (UTC+1)		Report		Stadium: Stade Chaban-Delmas; Referee: Damien Ledentu

18 March 2006 31	Troyes	1–1	Bordeaux	Troyes
20:00 CET (UTC+1)		Report		Stadium: Stade de l'Aube; Referee: Éric Poulat

26 March 2006 32	Bordeaux	1–0	Nice	Bordeaux
18:00 CET (UTC+1)	Denílson 1'	Report		Stadium: Stade Chaban-Delmas; Referee: Fredy Fautrel

2 April 2006 33	Paris Saint-Germain	3–1	Bordeaux	Paris
20:45 CEST (UTC+2)		Report		Stadium: Parc des Princes; Referee: Tony Chapron

8 April 2006 34	Bordeaux	0–0	Saint-Étienne	Bordeaux
20:00 CEST (UTC+2)		Report		Stadium: Stade Chaban-Delmas; Referee: Laurent Duhamel

15 April 2006 35	Lille	3–2	Bordeaux	Villeneuve-d'Ascq
17:15 CEST (UTC+2)		Report		Stadium: Stadium Lille Métropole; Referee: Jean-Philippe Izzo

23 April 2006 29	Sochaux	0–3	Bordeaux	Montbéliard
18:00 CET (UTC+1)		Report		Stadium: Stade Auguste Bonal; Referee: Claude Colombo

30 April 2006 36	Bordeaux	2–2	Le Mans	Bordeaux
16:30 CEST (UTC+2)		Report		Stadium: Stade Chaban-Delmas

6 May 2006 37	Nantes	0–1	Bordeaux	Nantes
20:00 CEST (UTC+2)		Report		Stadium: Stade de la Beaujoire; Referee: Tony Chapron

13 May 2006 38	Bordeaux	1–1	Marseille	Bordeaux
20:00 CEST (UTC+2)	Menegazzo 88'	Report	Maoulida 76'	Stadium: Stade Chaban-Delmas; Referee: Stéphane Bre

=== Coupe de la Ligue ===
26 October 2005 Second round	Bordeaux	1–0	Marseille	Bordeaux
17:00 CEST (UTC+2)				Stadium: Stade Chaban-Delmas; Attendance: 26,614; Referee: Laurent Duhamel

20 December 2005 Third round	Bordeaux	3–1	Nantes	Bordeaux
21:00 CET (UTC+1)				Stadium: Stade Chaban-Delmas; Attendance: 14,955; Referee: Damien Ledentu

17 January 2006 Quarter-finals	Nice	2–1 (a.e.t.)	Bordeaux	Nice
21:00 CET (UTC+1)	Bellion 45'; Balmont 110'		Šmicer 54'	Stadium: Stade du Ray; Attendance: 7,924; Referee: Alain Sars
