= Tabligbo =

- Location in Togo
- Coordinates: 6°35′N 1°30′E
- Country: Togo
- Region: Maritime Region

Tabligbo is a city and canton in Togo with 22,304 inhabitants (2010). It is the seat of Yoto prefecture in Maritime Region.

== Climate ==
Climate data for Tabligbo (1991–2020)
Month	Jan	Feb	Mar	Apr	May	Jun	Jul	Aug	Sep	Oct	Nov	Dec	Year
Mean daily maximum °C (°F)	35.0 (95.0)	36.3 (97.3)	35.5 (95.9)	34.7 (94.5)	33.6 (92.5)	31.7 (89.1)	30.8 (87.4)	30.4 (86.7)	31.5 (88.7)	32.7 (90.9)	34.1 (93.4)	34.8 (94.6)	33.4 (92.1)
Daily mean °C (°F)	28.5 (83.3)	30.0 (86.0)	29.9 (85.8)	29.4 (84.9)	28.7 (83.7)	27.4 (81.3)	26.7 (80.1)	26.3 (79.3)	27.1 (80.8)	27.7 (81.9)	28.6 (83.5)	28.6 (83.5)	28.2 (82.8)
Mean daily minimum °C (°F)	21.9 (71.4)	23.7 (74.7)	24.4 (75.9)	24.2 (75.6)	23.9 (75.0)	23.0 (73.4)	22.6 (72.7)	22.2 (72.0)	22.7 (72.9)	22.8 (73.0)	23.0 (73.4)	22.5 (72.5)	23.1 (73.6)
Average precipitation mm (inches)	6.2 (0.24)	26.2 (1.03)	98.8 (3.89)	116.1 (4.57)	150.0 (5.91)	166.5 (6.56)	99.1 (3.90)	50.3 (1.98)	120.7 (4.75)	149.5 (5.89)	48.9 (1.93)	10.4 (0.41)	1,042.7 (41.05)
Average precipitation days (≥ 1.0 mm)	1.0	2.7	7.0	7.8	10.9	13.0	9.6	8.2	11.7	13.7	5.8	1.5	92.9
Source: NOAA

== Industry ==
It was the site of a cement clinker works - CIMAO cement. The plant was active from 1980 to 1984. Several attempts to restart the plant were made until 1997, when WACEM (West Africa Cement) reopened it with an infusion of funds from an Indian company. In 1998 the plant was sold to Scancem, a Norwegian corporation.

== See also ==
- Railway stations in Togo
