= 2008–09 Olympique Lyonnais season =

Lyon
2008–09 season
- Owner: OL Groupe
- Chairman: Jean-Michel Aulas
- Manager: Claude Puel
- Stadium: Stade de Gerland
- Ligue 1: 3rd
- Coupe de France: Round of 16
- Coupe de la Ligue: Round of 16
- Trophée des Champions: Runners-up
- Champions League: Round of 16
- Top goalscorer: League: Karim Benzema (17); All: Karim Benzema (23)
- Highest home attendance: 40,245 vs AS Monaco (11 April 2009)
- Lowest home attendance: 23,053 vs Metz (11 November 2008)
Home colours	Away colours	Third colours

The 2008–09 season was Olympique Lyonnais's 50th anniversary season in Ligue 1 and was their 20th consecutive season in the top division of French football. They were the defending champions having won the title the past seven consecutive seasons. They were entering the season after achieving their first ever double after winning the Coupe de France, along with their league title.

== News ==
Following the 2007–08 season, it was announced by Lyon Chairman Jean-Michel Aulas that manager Alain Perrin would not be returning despite being the first Lyon manager to win the double. Lyon management attributed the firing to "Perrin's several malfunctions that affected the squad daily throughout the season" and their constant failure in Europe. Following an extensive search, which linked the Lyon managerial position to several managers, including former Manchester United assistant and current Portugal national football team coach Carlos Queiroz, Brazilian manager Vanderlei Luxemburgo, and former French players and managers Didier Deschamps and Laurent Blanc to name a few, it was announced on 18 June 2008 that Lille manager Claude Puel would succeed Perrin.

During the managerial search, Lyon made several transfers, though even prior to the managerial search, Lyon made a significant transfer deal, signing Brazilian midfielder Ederson from Nice in January for €15 million. The summer transfers included Hugo Lloris (€8.5 million) who was brought in to replace to outgoing Grégory Coupet, Miralem Pjanić (€7.5 million), Jean Makoun (€14 million) and John Mensah (€8.4 million), who was brought in to replace the outgoing Sébastien Squillaci.

Following last year promotions of youth players Sandy Paillot, Anthony Mounier and Romain Beynié from the youth scheme to the professional squad, Lyon signed another set of youth players to professional contracts. Midfielders Pierrick Valdivia (no relation to Chilean playmaker Jorge Valdivia), Clément Grenier and Saïd Mehamha, and striker Yannis Tafer were promoted to the first-team squad, although they will still play on Lyon's second squad in the CFA. Lyon also sign young prospect Timothée Kolodziejczak from Lens. Kolodziejcak, a teammate of Tafer and Grenier on the international stage, will initially move to Lyon on a loan with a purchase clause likely to occur at a later date. Also in an effort to increase their youths' playing time, Lyon re-loaned Sandy Paillot to Grenoble for the entirety of the season and loaned out midfielder Romain Beynié to Belgian side Tubize.

Notable departures included Loïc Rémy, who moved to Nice and French wunderkind Hatem Ben Arfa, who moved to rivals Marseille. The Ben Arfa move was put into speculation after Lyon officials argued that an agreement was not made between the two clubs. However, after a meeting between the two clubs organized by the LFP, the transfer was back on. Morevor, aforementioned central defender Sébastien Squillaci moved to Sevilla of La Liga.

Other departures include Grégory Coupet, who moved to Atlético Madrid after spending 12 years with the club, Patrick Müller and Frédéric Roux, whose contracts expired on 30 June 2008, and Marc Crosas, who returned to Barcelona after spending the winter on loan with Lyon. Inconsistent striker Milan Baroš additionally moved to Turkish side Galatasaray.

This summer also saw the departure of several Lyon youth players who will attempt to ply their trade elsewhere. Lossémy Karaboué, Alexandre Bouchard, and Aurélien Badin have moved to Ligue 2 sides Sedan, Châteauroux and Troyes respectively. The Italian Francesco Migliore moved to Belgian side R.A.E.C. Mons. Young striker Stephen Ettien moved to Scottish side Hamilton Academical, while Mohamed Bedda and Mickael Charvet earned trials at Strasbourg and Nice respectively.

== Transfers ==
=== Summer 2008 In ===
Date	Pos.	No.	Name	From	Fee	Source
2008-01-29	MF	7	(Brazil) Ederson	(France) Nice	€15M	Eurosport.uk
2008-05-15	FW	34	(France) Yannis Tafer		Promoted from Reserves	Boursica.com
2008-05-15	MF	22	(France) Clément Grenier		Promoted from Reserves	Boursica.com
2008-05-17	DF	15	(France) Sandy Paillot	(France) Grenoble	return from loan
2008-06-02	GK	1	(France) Hugo Lloris	(France) Nice	€8.5m	OLweb.fr
2008-06-05	MF	13	(France) Pierrick Valdivia		Promoted from Reserves	Mercato365.com
2008-06-06	MF	18	(Bosnia and Herzegovina) Miralem Pjanić	(France) Metz	€7.5M	OLweb.fr
2008-06-17	MF	17	(Cameroon) Jean Makoun	(France) Lille	€14M	OLweb.fr
2008-07-01	MF	31	(France) Saïd Mehamha		Promoted from Reserves	Mercato365.com
2008-07-09	MF	26	(Brazil) Fábio Santos	(Brazil) São Paulo	return from loan
2008-07-27	ST	21	(Czech Republic) Milan Baroš	(England) Portsmouth	return from loan
2008-07-21	DF	15	(Ghana) John Mensah	(France) Rennes	€8.4M	OLweb.fr
2008-07-31	FW	39	(France) Frédéric Piquionne	(France) AS Monaco	€4.5M	OLweb.fr
2008-08-21	DF	12	(France) Timothée Kolodziejczak	(France) Lens	On loan	OLweb.fr

Total spending: ▼€57.9 million

=== Summer 2008 out ===
Date	Pos.	No.	Name	To	Fee	Source
2008-05-26	MF	--	(Algeria) Mohamed Bedda	(France) Strasbourg	On trial	RacingStub.com
2008-06-02	FW	44	(France) Lossémy Karaboué	(France) Sedan	Free transfer	Mercato365.com
2008-06-05	FW	12	(France) Loïc Rémy	(France) Nice	€8M	Mercato365.com
2008-06-24	GK	--	(France) Alexandre Bouchard	(France) Châteauroux	Free transfer	Football365.fr
2008-06-24	DF	36	(France) Aurélien Badin	(France) Troyes	Free transfer	Mercato365.com
2008-06-30	GK	35	(France) Frédéric Roux	TBA	End of contract
2008-06-30	DF	4	(Switzerland) Patrick Müller	(France) AS Monaco	Free transfer	Setanta.com
2008-06-30	MF	21	(Spain) Marc Crosas	(Spain) Barcelona	loan return
2008-07-01	MF	18	(France) Hatem Ben Arfa	(France) Marseille	€12M	Mercato365.com
2008-07-05	GK	1	(France) Grégory Coupet	(Spain) Atlético Madrid	€1.5M	Soccerway.com
2008-07-14	DF	47	(Italy) Francesco Migliore	(Belgium) Mons	Free transfer	LyonCapitale.fr
2008-07-15	DF	22	(Brazil) Anderson	(Brazil) São Paulo	loan	SkySports.com
2008-07-17	DF	29	(France) Sébastien Squillaci	(Spain) Sevilla	€6.5M	UEFA.com
2008-08-20	DF	15	(France) Sandy Paillot	(France) Grenoble	On loan	Mercato365.com
2008-08-21	MF	24	(France) Romain Beynié	(Belgium) Tubize	On loan	Mercato365.com
2008-08-26	FW	21	(Czech Republic) Milan Baroš	(Turkey) Galatasaray	€5.5M	Galatasaray.org
2008-08-30	FW	--	(France) Stephen Ettien	(Scotland) Hamilton Academical	Free transfer	AcciesFC.co.uk

Total income: ▲€33.5 million

=== Winter 2009 out ===
Date	Pos.	No.	Name	To	Fee	Source
2009-01-23	DF	22	(Brazil) Anderson	(Brazil) Cruzeiro	Loan	Mercato365.com
2009-01-31	DF	33	(France) Mickaël Charvet	(France) Ajaccio	Free transfer	Mercato365.fr
2009-03-01	FW	9	(Brazil) Fred	(Brazil) Fluminense	Free	SkySports.com

== Squad information ==
Last updated May 30, 2009

N	Pos.	Nat.	Name	Age	EU	Since	App	Goals	Ends	Transfer fee	Notes
1	GK	(France)	Lloris	21	EU	2008	45	0	2013	€8.5M	
2	DF	(France)	Clerc	25	EU	2002	103	1	2010	Youth system	
3	DF	(Brazil)	Cris (VC)	31	Non-EU	2004	193	17	2011	€3.5M	
4	DF	(France)	Boumsong	28	EU	2008	60	2	2011	€3M	
5	MF	(France)	Bodmer	25	EU	2007	70	7	2011	€6.5M	
6	MF	(Sweden)	Källström	26	EU	2006	134	12	2010	€8M	
7	MF	(Brazil)	Ederson	22	Non-EU	2008	45	5	2013	€15M	
8	MF	(Brazil)	Juninho (captain)	33	EU	2001	303	100	2010	Free	
10	FW	(France)	Benzema	20	EU	2004	141	63	2013	Youth system	
11	DF	(Italy)	Grosso	30	EU	2007	76	2	2011	€7.5M	
12	DF	(France)	Kolodziejczak	16	EU	2008	1	0	Undisclosed	Loan	
13	MF	(France)	Valdivia	20	EU	2008	0	0	2009	Youth system	
14	FW	(France)	Govou (VC)	29	EU	1999	317	55	2010	Youth system	
15	DF	(Ghana)	Mensah	25	Non-EU	2008	17	0	2013	€8.4M	
17	MF	(Cameroon)	Makoun	25	EU	2008	46	9	2012	€14M	
18	MF	(Bosnia and Herzegovina)	Pjanić	18	EU	2008	23	0	2013	€8M	
19	MF	(Argentina)	Delgado	26	Non-EU	2008	35	3	2011	€11M	
20	DF	(France)	Réveillère	28	EU	2003	200	6	2011	Free	
22	MF	(France)	Grenier	17	EU	2008	0	0	2011	Youth system	
23	FW	(Ivory Coast)	Keïta	27	Non-EU	2007	70	8	2011	€18M	
25	GK	(France)	Hartock	21	EU	2005	0	0	2009	Youth system	
26	MF	(Brazil)	Fábio Santos	27	Non-EU	2006	25	0	2010	€4.2M	
27	FW	(France)	Mounier	20	EU	2007	27	5	2010	Youth system	
28	MF	(France)	Toulalan	24	EU	2006	125	0	2013	€7M	
29	FW	(France)	Tafer	17	EU	2008	4	0	2011	Youth system	
30	GK	(France)	Vercoutre	28	EU	2002	47	0	2010	Free	
31	MF	(France)	Mehamha	17	EU	2008	0	0	2011	Youth system	
32	DF	(France)	Gassama	18	EU	2008	10	0	2011	Youth system	
34	FW	(France)	Pied	19	EU	2008	0	0	2011	Youth system	
35	DF	(France)	Fontaine	17	EU	2008	0	0	Undisclosed	Youth system	
36	MF	(France)	Faure	17	EU	2008	1	0	Undisclosed	Youth system	
38	FW	(France)	Lacazette	17	EU	2008	0	0	Undisclosed	Youth system	
39	FW	(France)	Piquionne	29	EU	2008	26	4	2012	€4.5M	

- Last updated: 30 May
- Source: Olympique Lyonnais and ESPN.com

== Club ==
=== Coaching staff ===
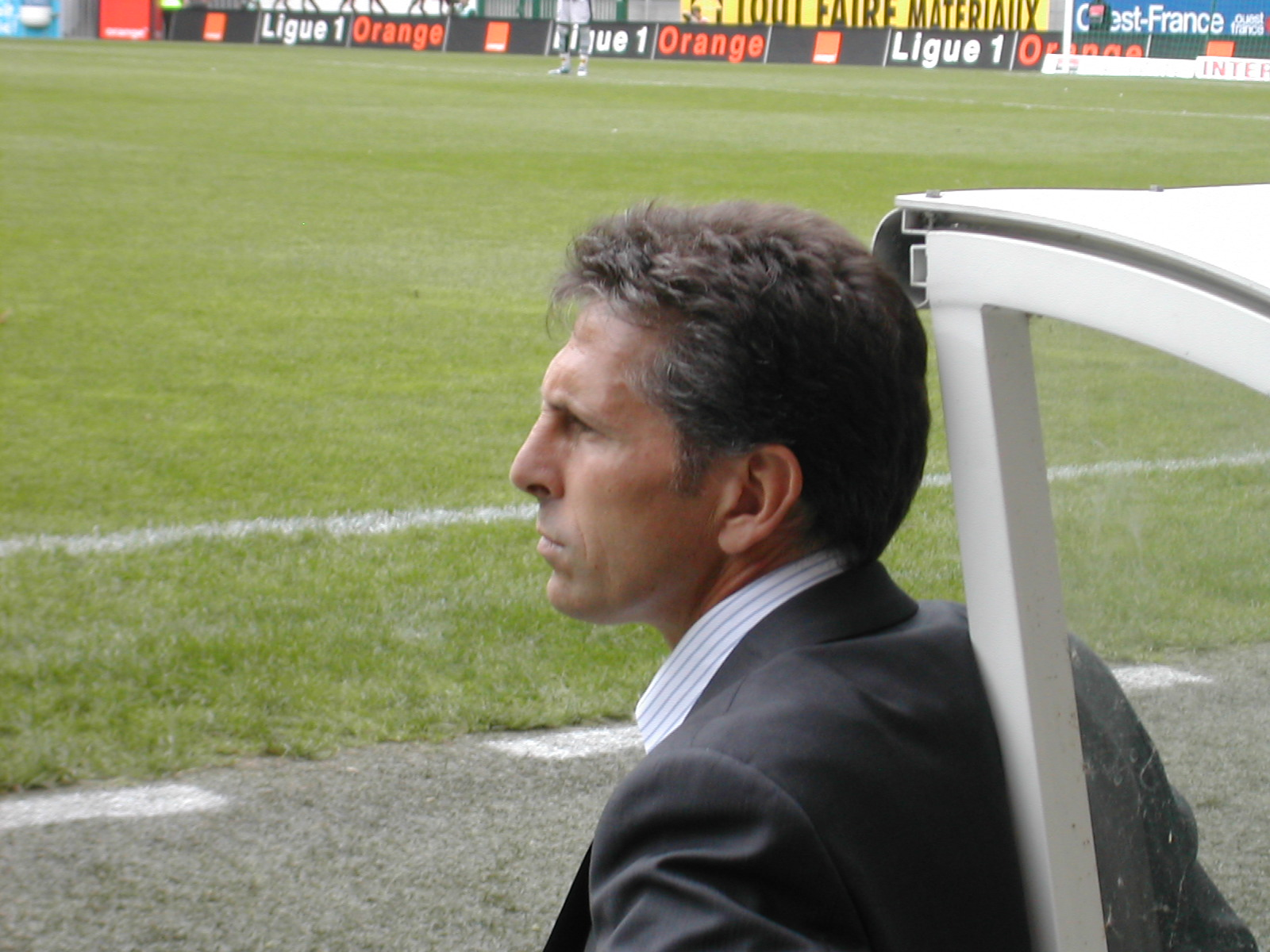
Claude Puel, first season with Lyon.

Position	Staff
Manager	(France) Claude Puel
Assistant manager	(France) Patrick Collot
Assistant manager	(France) Bruno Genesio
First team coach	(France) Rémi Garde
Striker coach	(Brazil) Sonny Anderson
Goalkeeping coach	(France) Joël Bats
Team doctor	(France) Jean-Jacques Amprino
Team doctor	(France) Emmanuel Ohrant
Fitness coach	(France) Robert Duverne

Last updated: 31 July
Source: OLweb.fr

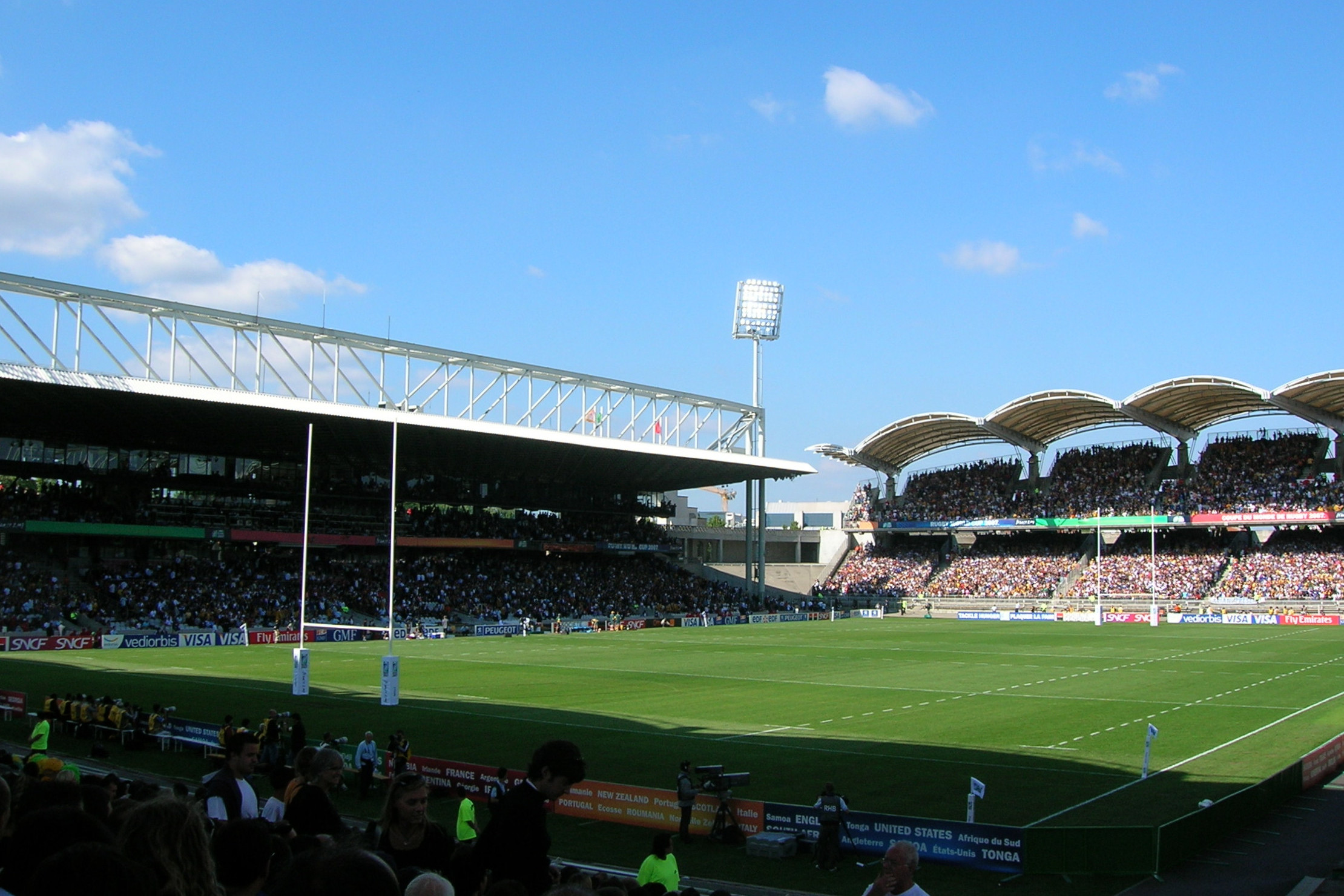
Stade de Gerland, current stadia of Lyon.

=== Other information ===
Chairman	(France) Jean-Michel Aulas
Special Advisor	(France) Bernard Lacombe
Club Ambassador	(Brazil) Sonny Anderson
Ground (capacity and dimensions)	Stade de Gerland (41,044 / 112x65 meters)

Updated to match played 7 March
Source: OLweb.fr

== Team kits ==
Umbro will provide the kits for Olympique Lyonnais. Umbro have been the official kit provider of Lyon since 2003 and just last year signed an extension with Lyon until 2013. This season, Lyon will have brand new home, away, and Champions League kits. The kits were presented on June 30, 2008. The new home kit is original white with the red and blue vertical strip, along with single blue stripes along the shoulders. The new away kit is all blue with single black stripes along the shoulders and the new Champions League away kit is electric yellow with the red and blue vertical stripe, along with single red and blue stripes on the shoulders. The team's alternate away kit consists of the home shirt with red shorts and white socks. It is only worn when Lyon are unable to wear their white shorts in an away tie due to the designated home team wearing white shorts.

Supplier: Umbro
Sponsor(s): Novotel (home) and Ticket Restaurant (away)

Home Kit	Away Kit	Euro Kit	Alternate Away Kit	Goalkeeper Kit	Goalkeeper Away Kit

== Pre-season friendlies ==
Lyon played a total of six friendly matches. Lyon opened up their pre-season on 12 July with a 3–2 victory over Nîmes in Albertville, near Tignes, the location of Lyon's pre-season camp. A week later, on 19 July, they traveled away to Bucharest to face Rapid București, which resulted in a 2–1 loss. They then took a trip to Belgrade to play against Partizan on 23 July. Lyon came out with a positive result, beating the Serbian side 3–1 with goals from Karim Benzema and Sidney Govou. They followed that victory up with another as they cruised to a 3–0 victory over Ligue 1 side Nancy in nearby Villefranche-sur-Saône. Their last friendly in the month of July would in turn be a 0–1 defeat to AS Monaco on July 29 in Annecy.

Friendly

12 July 2008	Lyon (France)	3–2	(France) Nîmes	Albertville
19:00	Juninho 11'; Tafer 41'; Mounier 64'		Ech-Chergui 10'; Kébé 23'	Stadium: Stade du Parc Olympique

19 July 2008	Rapid București (Romania)	2–1	(France) Lyon	Bucharest, Romania
19:00	Boya 5', 43'		Tafer 57'	Stadium: Stadionul Giulești-Valentin Stănescu; Referee: Mugurel Vădan

23 July 2008	Partizan (Serbia)	1–3	(France) Lyon	Belgrade, Serbia
20:00	Moreira 39'		Sikimić 16' (o.g.); Govou 22'; Benzema 64'	Stadium: Partizan Stadium

24 July 2008	Lyon (France)	3–0	(France) Nancy	Villefranche-sur-Saône
19:30	Juninho 6'; Pied 68'; Tafer 77'			Stadium: Stade Armand Chouffet; Attendance: 3,000

29 July 2008	Lyon (France)	0–1	(France) Monaco	Annecy
19:00			Licata 3'	Stadium: Parc des Sports; Attendance: 3,500; Referee: Dominique Fraise

== Competitions ==
Lyon opened up their Ligue 1 season in a positive fashion, defeating Toulouse 3–0 with a brace from Karim Benzema and a rare goal from Jean Makoun. Following a 0–0 draw away to Lorient, which dropped them to third in the league standings, Lyon rebounded with back-to-back wins over Rhône-Alpes rivals Grenoble and Saint-Étienne respectively. Following that, Lyon picked up their third-straight victory with a 3–2 win over Nice. The match was, however, marred with controversy—after trailing 0–2, Lyon got back into the match with two spectacular free-kicks from Juninho. With the match in injury time and looking to end in a draw, referee Jean-Charles Cailleux and one of his assistant referees ruled a handball infraction had been committed by Nice defender Vincent Hognon in the box, giving Lyon a penalty which was converted by Benzema. Looking at the replay, it could have easily been determined that the handball infraction had been without malice and that the penalty should have not been given. However, Lyon escaped with a victory, which moved them into first place. They followed this win up with back to back one goal wins over newly promoted side Le Havre and Nancy giving them five-straight league victories.

The following week, Lyon received their first loss in the league against Rennes that would later be described as a "thrashing" by the media. Lyon struggled in every aspect of the match and allowed Rennes striker Mickaël Pagis to score a hat-trick, the last goal being a beautiful strike from almost 30 yards out. The loss to Rennes showed as Lyon's horrible form continued drawing with both Lille and Auxerre the following two weeks. Lyon finally got back on track with shut-out wins over Sochaux, Le Mans and Monaco before heading into their showdown with imminent rivals Bordeaux. With Lyon playing at home, they proved to still be the most dominant French side in the league, defeating Bordeaux 2–1 with goals from Benzema and a beautiful goal from Kim Källström. The following week, Lyon got another test, this time in Paris. In this match, Lyon not only incurred their second defeat, but they lost their consistent right back Anthony Réveillère to injury with the player likely being out for the season, though he later returned to the squad. The following match, Lyon only managed a 0–0 draw in the downpouring rain against Valenciennes.

Lyon suffered their third defeat of the season the following week against relegation strugglers Nantes. Lyon came into the match apparently looking ahead to their Champions League clash with Bayern Munich and proceeded to underestimate the West Coast side, who defeated Lyon 1–2 with two goals from the Croat Ivan Klasnić. The loss was promptly followed by a showdown for first place with rivals Marseille the following week. Other than battling for first place, the return of Hatem Ben Arfa to the Stade Gerland was on the minds of supporters, as well as the players. However, despite the hype and build-up leading up to the match, including achieving a record television audience, both clubs failed to score a goal as the match ended in another 0–0 draw. Lyon finally ended their winless run with a 1–0 victory over Caen with Benzema scoring Lyon's lone goal, his tenth of the league campaign. With the victory, Lyon were assured first place heading into the three-week winter break.

Lyon returned from the winter break taking on Lorient. Despite getting an early goal from Ederson, Lyon failed to get a winning result leaving the match with a 1–1 draw. The following week, they rebounded with a 2–0 victory over Grenoble with Ederson getting on the scoreboard for the second-straight week. Due to Lyon's cup matches being postponed, they were forced to endure two cup matches in a span of four days before facing rivals Saint-Étienne. The match ended in another 1–1 draw. After a full week of training, Lyon again rebounded from a draw picking up a convincing 3–1 victory over Hugo Lloris' former club Nice, with Jean Makoun scoring an unexpected brace. This match also marked the league debut of youth product Yannis Tafer. The following week, they picked up another convincing 3–1 win, this time against Le Havre, with Makoun scoring again. This match also marked Lyon's third-straight match where a red card was given. The following week, Lyon again earned a victory, defeating Nancy 2–0. Lyon started the match without the majority of their regulars who were being rested for the first leg of their Champion's League showdown with Barcelona.

Returning from Champion's League play, Lyon faced Rennes, who was responsible for the champions first loss of the season. The match remained even until the 66th minute when Kim Källström scored following a gifted pass from the youngster Miralem Pjanić. The scoreline remained until injury time when Rennes striker Jimmy Briand scored after receiving a nice through-ball which caught Lyon defender Cris off guard. Briand proceeded to get a shot on the ball off balance, which got past the charging Hugo Lloris to tie the match 1–1, the eventual final scoreline. Lyon followed this draw with a defeat taking on Lille, whom they had just contested three days ago in a Coupe de France tie. With the match being played at the Stade de France and the clubs entertaining a record crowd, Lyon fielded a pretty strong, yet questionable side with players Mathieu Bodmer and François Clerc returning from a long absence and also having the task of defeating Barcelona in Spain in the second leg of their Champion's League clash. In the match, Lyon failed constantly to get on the scoreboard with the former mastiff Kader Keïta missing on numerous opportunities. Lille made sure they made good on their chances with Róbert Vittek scoring the opening goal in the 60th minute and Michel Bastos finishing off Lyon, scoring the second goal in the 88th minute to pick up a 0–2 victory.

After returning from their embarrassing defeat to Barcelona in Spain, Lyon suffered another embarrassment losing their first match at home this season to minnows Auxerre, despite both management and Claude Puel stating the club would respond positively to their elimination from the Champion's League. Fielding exactly the same lineup that lost 2–5 to Barcelona, Lyon failed for the second week in a row to get on the scoreboard losing 0–2 to Auxerre, who got goals from Ireneusz Jeleń and Thomas Kahlenberg, leaving Lyon to hope they get a positive result from the Le Classique in order to hold on to their first-place position.

They would indeed keep hold of first place as a result of Marseille's 3–1 victory over PSG. Lyon responded by picking up their first league victory in over three matches in a 2–0 win over Sochaux. They captured their second-straight league victory in a win over Le Mans with Karim Benzema securing a much-needed brace in a 3–1 win. With the likes of Marseille, Bordeaux, PSG, Lille and Toulouse on their backs, Lyon needed victories to ensure their eighth-straight league title. They proceeded to falter drawing with mid-table club Monaco 2–2. Despite being ten spots down in the table, Monaco were the stronger side forcing Lyon to come back from a goal down twice. The draw also dropped Lyon from the top spot, which they had held since the fourth week of the season. With Marseille recording a victory over Lorient hours before, Lyon needed a victory over Bordeaux to ensure they remain in the title race. Early on in the match, Lyon were denied a clear penalty chance after Ederson was taking down in the box by Bordeaux right back Matthieu Chalmé. Bordeaux proceeded to score just before half-time with a goal from the former Lyonnais Alou Diarra after Wendel hit the post on a shot off a corner kick. Chalmé would be involved in another denied penalty dispute later in the match, this time with Benzema. Despite the initial foul occurring inside the penalty box, referee Stéphane Bré ruled the foul had occurred outside the box where Benzema fell. Eventually, Lyon fell to Bordeaux dropping the defending champions to third and, instead of fighting for the title, were now fighting for the third and final Champions League place with PSG, whom they faced next week. Played on a Friday, Lyon failed to score a goal for the second straight week as the match ended in a 0–0 draw. The next week against Valenciennes, Lyon endured their seventh defeat of the season, losing 0–2. The lost effectively, but not mathematically, eliminated Lyon from winning their eight consecutive title. That occurred the following week. Despite defeating Nantes 3–0 with Jean Makoun scoring a brace, a victory by Bordeaux over Valenciennes eliminated Lyon from title contention.

Instead of reminiscing, Lyon took the opportunity to focus on qualifying for next year's UEFA Champions League with a key match against Marseille. Though they were positioned for the third qualifying round in the standings, Lyon looked to jump Marseille into second position to go directly through the group stage. In front of a record crowd for a Marseille match, Lyon cruised to a 3–1 victory, with Benzema finally ending his goal drought scoring a brace. Juninho scored the third goal. The following week, against Caen, Juninho and Benzema scored again in a 3–1 victory. For Juninho, it was his 100th career goal for Lyon. Juninho also received a standing ovation upon being substituted out, in what some knew was his final match at the Stade Gerland. Unfortunately, the victory was with malice since Marseille also won that week. Lyon were now guaranteed to finish in the third spot, meaning they would be seeded directly into the Playoff round, where they might end up facing the likes of the 2008–09 UEFA Cup champions Shakhtar Donetsk and Sporting CP.

=== Trophée des Champions ===
Since Lyon won both the league and the Coupe de France, they faced the club that finished in second place in Ligue 1 this past season, Bordeaux. The match was played on 2 August at Bordeaux's ground, the Stade Chaban-Delmas. After 90 minutes without a goal, Bordeaux defeated Lyon 5–4 on penalties to earn their first Trophée des Champions title, ending Lyon's streak of six-straight Trophée des Champions titles.

2 August 2008 Final	Lyon	0–0 (4–5 p)	Bordeaux	Bordeaux
17:55				Stadium: Stade Chaban-Delmas; Attendance: 27,167; Referee: Bertrand Layec
	Penalties
	Benzema (penalty scored); Bodmer (penalty scored); Källström (penalty scored); Govou (penalty missed); Grosso (penalty missed); Toulalan (penalty scored); Cris (penalty missed)		(penalty missed) Cavenaghi; (penalty scored) Fernando; (penalty scored) Wendel; (penalty missed) Bellion; (penalty scored) Gourcuff; (penalty scored) Jurietti; (penalty scored) Diawara

=== Ligue 1 ===
==== League table ====
Pos	Team	Pld	W	D	L	GF	GA	GD	Pts	Qualification or relegation
1	Bordeaux (C)	38	24	8	6	64	34	+30	80	Qualification to Champions League group stage
2	Marseille	38	22	11	5	67	35	+32	77	Qualification to Champions League group stage
3	Lyon	38	20	11	7	52	29	+23	71	Qualification to Champions League play-off round
4	Toulouse	38	16	16	6	45	27	+18	64	Qualification to Europa League play-off round
5	Lille	38	17	13	8	51	39	+12	64	Qualification to Europa League third qualifying round

Source: Ligue 1
Rules for classification: 1) points; 2) goal difference; 3) number of goals scored.
France's third UEFA Europa League spot went to Ligue 2 side Guingamp, winners of 2008–09 Coupe de France.
(C) Champions

==== Results summary ====
Overall								Home						Away					
Pld	W	D	L	GF	GA	GD	Pts	W	D	L	GF	GA	GD	W	D	L	GF	GA	GD
38	20	11	7	49	28	+21	71	10	8	1	29	14	+15	10	3	6	20	14	+6

Source: lfp.fr

==== Results by round ====
Round	1	2	3	4	5	6	7	8	9	10	11	12	13	14	15	16	17	18	19	20	21	22	23	24	25	26	27	28	29	30	31	32	33	34	35	36	37	38
Ground	H	A	H	A	H	A	H	A	H	A	A	H	A	H	A	H	A	H	A	H	A	H	A	H	A	H	N	H	H	A	H	A	H	A	H	A	H	A
Result	W	D	W	W	W	W	W	L	D	D	W	W	W	W	L	D	L	D	W	D	W	D	W	W	W	D	L	L	W	W	D	L	D	L	W	W	W	D
Position	1	3	2	2	1	1	1	1	1	1	1	1	1	1	1	1	1	1	1	1	1	1	1	1	1	1	1	1	1	1	2	3	3	3	3	3	3	3

Source: lfp.fr
A = Away; H = Home; N = Neutral; W = Win; D = Draw; L = Loss

==== Matches ====
10 August 2008 1	Lyon	3–0	Toulouse	Lyon
21:00 CEST	Makoun 12'; Benzema 57', 65'			Stadium: Stade de Gerland; Attendance: 36,448; Referee: Fredy Fautrel

17 August 2008 2	Lorient	0–0	Lyon	Lorient
16:00 CEST				Stadium: Stade du Moustoir; Attendance: 14,617; Referee: Antony Gautier

23 August 2008 3	Lyon	2–0	Grenoble	Lyon
21:00 CEST	Makoun 6'; Benzema 37'			Stadium: Stade de Gerland; Attendance: 38,754; Referee: Hervé Piccirillo

31 August 2008 4	Saint-Étienne	0–1	Lyon	Saint-Étienne
21:00 CEST			Benzema 56'	Stadium: Stade Geoffroy-Guichard; Attendance: 34,704; Referee: Laurent Duhamel

13 September 2008 5	Lyon	3–2	Nice	Lyon
19:00 CEST	Juninho 40', 73'; Benzema 90+5' (pen.)		Bamogo 3'; Rémy 20'; Rool (red card) 90+5'	Stadium: Stade de Gerland; Attendance: 35,925; Referee: Jean-Charles Cailleux

20 September 2008 6	Le Havre	0–1	Lyon	Le Havre
19:00 CEST			Ederson 45' (pen.); Govou (yellow card) 55' (yellow-red card) 66'	Stadium: Stade Jules Deschaseaux; Attendance: 16,211; Referee: Philippe Kalt

27 September 2008 7	Lyon	2–1	Nancy	Lyon
19:00 CEST	Benzema 31'; Fred 36'			Stadium: Stade de Gerland; Attendance: 36,895; Referee: Stéphane Bré

5 October 2008 8	Rennes	3–0	Lyon	Rennes
17:00 CEST	Pagis 17', 57', 67'			Stadium: Stade de la Route de Lorient; Attendance: 27,816; Referee: Damien Ledentu

18 October 2008 9	Lyon	2–2	Lille	Lyon
21:00 CEST	Chedjou 22' (o.g.); Grosso 76'		Rami 14'; Bastos 62'	Stadium: Stade de Gerland; Attendance: 38,314; Referee: Thierry Auriac

25 October 2008 10	Auxerre	0–0	Lyon	Auxerre
19:00 CEST				Stadium: Stade de l'Abbé-Deschamps; Attendance: 15,042; Referee: Saïd Ennjimi

29 October 2008 11	Sochaux	0–2	Lyon	Montbéliard
19:00 CET	Dalmat (red card) 81'; Perquis (yellow card) 81' (yellow-red card) 90+4'		Benzema 66'; Delgado 90+3'	Stadium: Stade Auguste Bonal; Attendance: 17,482; Referee: Antony Gautier

2 November 2008 12	Lyon	2–0	Le Mans	Lyon
21:00 CET	Benzema 22'; Juninho 56'			Stadium: Stade de Gerland; Attendance: 36,456; Referee: Lionel Jaffredo

8 November 2008 13	Monaco	0–1	Lyon	Monaco
19:00 CET			Fred 56'	Stadium: Stade Louis II; Attendance: 10,444; Referee: Hervé Piccirillo

16 November 2008 14	Lyon	2–1	Bordeaux	Lyon
21:00 CET	Benzema 33'; Källström 38'		Cavenaghi 80'	Stadium: Stade de Gerland; Attendance: 36,341; Referee: Bertrand Layec

22 November 2008 15	Paris Saint-Germain	1–0	Lyon	Paris
21:00 CET	Giuly 25'		Juninho (red card) 77'	Stadium: Parc des Princes; Attendance: 44,780; Referee: Stéphane Lannoy

29 November 2008 16	Lyon	0–0	Valenciennes	Lyon
19:00 CET				Stadium: Stade de Gerland; Attendance: 35,988; Referee: Bruno Coué

6 December 2008 17	Nantes	2–1	Lyon	Nantes
21:00 CET	Klasnić 60', 89'		Piquionne 44'	Stadium: Stade de la Beaujoire; Attendance: 26,624; Referee: Damien Ledentu

14 December 2008 18	Lyon	0–0	Marseille	Lyon
21:00 CET				Stadium: Stade de Gerland; Attendance: 39,638; Referee: Stéphane Bré

20 December 2008 19	Caen	0–1	Lyon	Caen
21:00 CET			Benzema 43'	Stadium: Stade Michel d'Ornano; Attendance: 20,613; Referee: Lionel Jaffredo

10 January 2009 20	Lyon	1–1	Lorient	Lyon
21:00 CET	Ederson 7'		Abriel 43'	Stadium: Stade de Gerland; Attendance: 34,809; Referee: Hervé Piccirillo

17 January 2009 21	Grenoble	0–2	Lyon	Grenoble
19:00 CET			Ederson 14'; Delgado 77'	Stadium: Stade des Alpes; Attendance: 19,264; Referee: Thierry Auriac

1 February 2009 22	Lyon	1–1	Saint-Étienne	Lyon
21:00 CET	Juninho 53'; Piquionne (yellow card) 41' (yellow-red card) 54'		Mirallas 50'	Stadium: Stade de Gerland; Attendance: 38,590; Referee: Stéphane Lannoy

8 February 2009 23	Nice	1–3	Lyon	Nice
17:00 CET	Apam 45+1'; Adeílson (red card) 85'		Makoun 18', 80'; Benzema 27'; Sablé (red card) 57'; Benzema (penalty missed) 75'	Stadium: Stade du Ray; Attendance: 12,844; Referee: Bertrand Layec

15 February 2009 24	Lyon	3–1	Le Havre	Lyon
17:00 CET	Ederson 34'; Keita 44'; Mensah (yellow card) 52' (yellow-red card) 70'; Juninho 74'		Nestor 82'	Stadium: Stade de Gerland; Attendance: 37,118; Referee: Alain Hamer

21 February 2009 25	Nancy	0–2	Lyon	Tomblaine
19:00 CET	Hadji (penalty missed) 47'		Cris 19'; Benzema 90+2'	Stadium: Stade Marcel Picot; Attendance: 18,953; Referee: Fredy Fautrel

1 March 2009 26	Lyon	1–1	Rennes	Lyon
21:00 CET	Källström 67'		Briand 90+1'	Stadium: Stade de Gerland; Attendance: 34,870; Referee: Philippe Kalt

7 March 2009 27	Lille	2–0	Lyon	Saint-Denis
21:00 CET	Vittek 60'; Bastos 89'			Stadium: Stade de France; Attendance: 78,056; Referee: Saïd Ennjimi

15 March 2009 28	Lyon	0–2	Auxerre	Lyon
17:00 CET			Jelen 42'; Hengbart (penalty missed) 90+2'; Kahlenberg 90+4'	Stadium: Stade de Gerland; Attendance: 37,846; Referee: Thierry Auriac

22 March 2009 29	Lyon	2–0	Sochaux	Lyon
17:00 CET	Ederson 14'; Mounier 71'			Stadium: Stade de Gerland; Attendance: 37,334; Referee: Olivier Thual

4 April 2009 30	Le Mans	1–3	Lyon	Le Mans
19:00 CEST	Le Tallec 77'		Boumsong 17'; Benzema 44', 57'	Stadium: Stade Léon-Bollée; Attendance: 13,175; Referee: Philippe Malige

12 April 2009 31	Lyon	2–2	Monaco	Lyon
21:00 CEST	Cris 65'; Piquionne 81'		Leko 34'; Pino 66'	Stadium: Stade de Gerland; Attendance: 40,245; Referee: Antony Gautier

19 April 2009 32	Bordeaux	1–0	Lyon	Bordeaux
21:00 CEST	Diarra 42'			Stadium: Stade Chaban-Delmas; Attendance: 32,858; Referee: Stéphane Bré

24 April 2009 33	Lyon	0–0	Paris Saint-Germain	Lyon
20:30 CEST				Stadium: Stade de Gerland; Attendance: 38,827; Referee: Bertrand Layec

2 May 2009 34	Valenciennes	2–0	Lyon	Valenciennes
19:00 CEST	Audel 23', 29'			Stadium: Stade Nungesser; Attendance: 14,864; Referee: Hervé Piccirillo

12 May 2009 35	Lyon	3–0	Nantes	Lyon
21:00 CEST	Makoun 7', 35'; Mounier 78'			Stadium: Stade de Gerland; Attendance: 36,792; Referee: Lionel Jaffredo

17 May 2009 36	Marseille	1–3	Lyon	Marseille
21:00 CEST	Wiltord 80'		Benzema 31' (pen.), 42'; Juninho 90+3'	Stadium: Stade Vélodrome; Attendance: 56,498; Referee: Stéphane Lannoy

23 May 2009 37	Lyon	3–1	Caen	Lyon
21:00 CEST	Juninho 35' (pen.); Govou 70'; Benzema 89'		Savidan 81'	Stadium: Stade de Gerland; Attendance: 39,312; Referee: Damien Ledentu

30 May 2009 38	Toulouse	0–0	Lyon	Toulouse
20:00 CEST			Mensah (yellow card) 6' (yellow-red card) 37'	Stadium: Stadium de Toulouse; Attendance: 33,462; Referee: Antony Gautier

=== Coupe de France ===
Lyon entered the 2008–09 Coupe de France season as defending champions, having won the title the previous season in a highly contested 1–0 victory against Paris Saint-Germain. Lyon began the defense of their title heading to the West coast to take on the Brittany-based side US Concarneau. The match was postponed from its assigned 3 January date due to a frozen pitch and was rescheduled to be played on January 24, 2009. Though Lyon were the dominant side the entire match, the score at halftime was only 2–0. Lyon came out blazing in the second half scoring four goals, three of them in the final six minutes of the match to defeat Concarneau by a score of 6–0.

Lyon advanced to the Round of 32 where they faced rivals Marseille in what was the first big draw of the Cup. In the match, Lyon got off to a quick start with Karim Benzema scoring the first goal in just the second minute. The rest of the match was fairly even, though, marred with several incidents, including former Lyon player Hatem Ben Arfa receiving a barrage of boos when he entered as a substitute in the 16th minute, as well as every time he touched the ball and Lyon player Kader Keïta picking up a second yellow card for elbowing new Marseille player Brandão in the face. In the end, Benzema's goal was the only goal of the match with Lyon securing their place in the Round of 16, where they faced another secondary rival, Lille. Lille, whom Lyon were to face in a league tie three days later, opened the scoring with a goal from Michel Bastos in the 22nd minute. Lyon responded just two minutes later with a goal from Jean Makoun. Just before half-time, Lille's prolific youngster Eden Hazard scored to give Lille a 2–1 lead. Lyon again responded just two minutes later in injury time with a goal from a Lyon youngster Anthony Mounier, thus evening the match heading into halftime. With Lyon constantly responding back, Lille effectively ended Lyon's chances of defending their title by scoring at the death with a goal from Nicolas Fauvergue giving Lyon no time to respond back, eliminating the defending champions from the Coupe de France.

==== Matches ====
24 January 2009 Round of 64	Concarneau	0–6	Lyon	Guingamp
14:30 CET			Boumsong 28'; Mounier 35', 62'; Delgado 87'; Keita 89'; Piquionne 90'	Stadium: Stade du Roudourou; Attendance: 15,615; Referee: Fredy Fautrel

28 January 2009 Round of 32	Lyon	1–0	Marseille	Lyon
20:45 CET	Benzema 2'; Keita (yellow card) 58' (yellow-red card) 63'			Stadium: Stade de Gerland; Attendance: 28,308; Referee: Laurent Duhamel

4 March 2009 Round of 16	Lille	3–2	Lyon	Villeneuve-d'Ascq
20:45 CET	Bastos 22'; Hazard 45'; Fauvergue 90+2'		Makoun 24'; Mounier 45+2'	Stadium: Stadium Lille Métropole; Attendance: 15,155; Referee: Stéphane Bré

=== Coupe de la Ligue ===
Lyon entered the Coupe de la Ligue season having last won the cup in 2001. The previous season, they were eliminated in the quarterfinals by Le Mans. As with all other years, Lyon entered the cup in the Round of 16 as they qualified for the UEFA Champions League, where they faced last year's relegated side Metz. However, despite being relegated last season, Metz pulled off a tremendous 1–3 victory eliminating the defending league champions from the competition for the 8th straight season. Since winning the title in 2001, Lyon have only made it to January (usually when the quarter-finals take place) four times.

==== Matches ====
11 November 2008 Round of 16	Lyon	1–3	Metz	Lyon
21:00 CET	Cris 47'		Mendy 20'; Renouard 28'; Rocchi 66'	Stadium: Stade de Gerland; Attendance: 23,053; Referee: Fredy Fautrel

=== UEFA Champions League ===
Lyon entered the 2008–09 UEFA Champions League for the eighth-straight season. Due to finishing as champions of Ligue 1 the past season, Lyon again entered directly to the group stage. The draw for the group stage was determined on August 28, 2008. Lyon were paired with the defending German champions Bayern Munich, Italian side Fiorentina and the Romanian runners-up Steaua București.

Lyon began their Champions League quest at home taking on Fiorentina. Lyon also unveiled their fluorescent green third kit in this match. As with the Nice match, which occurred just four days before, this match had its share of controversy. Following a disappointing first half, with Fiorentina leading 0–2 after two goals from Alberto Gilardino, Lyon came out for the second half with scoring in mind. With Lyon attacking, following a cross into the box, a collision occurred just inside the field of play between Frédéric Piquionne and Fiorentina defender Luciano Zauri, which unexpectedly injured the latter. Following a clearance by the Fiorentina defence, it was expected, by Fiorentina, that the ball would be put out of play with fair play being in mind. However, with Lyon trailing 0–2 and several Lyon players not having any idea of Zauri being down, they proceeded to attack and eventually a goal was scored by Piquionne. Following this incident, Lyon still trailed 1–2, but in the 86th minute, after earning a free kick, Juninho and Benzema proceeded to display excellent and sly teamwork as Benzema equalised for his side drawing the match 2–2 and giving both clubs one point through one round.

With one point in hand, Lyon traveled to Munich to take on group leaders Bayern, who defeated Steaua București 1–0 on the opening matchday. With both teams coming off unimpressive matches a couple of days before (Lyon an unspectacular 2–1 victory over Nancy and Bayern, a 0–1 loss away to Hannover 96), the match showed why with Lyon's only goal coming off the head of Bayern defender Martín Demichelis in the 25th minute from one of Juninho's spot-kicks. Bayern later equalised through Zé Roberto in the second half. Though Lyon had decent chances, including one where Karim Benzema had a chance to capitalize on a Bayern mistake late in the second half, the match remained 1–1 with Lyon leaving Munich with just two points through two matches.

After starting off slow, Lyon rebounded picking up two victories in their home-away series with Steaua. Similar to last season matches with VfB Stuttgart, Lyon used these matches to get back into the competition defeating Steaua 5–3 in Romania. They came back from a 2–0 deficit and a 3–2 one-goal deficit before finishing off the Romanian side in the latter portion of the second half with a goal from Benzema and a brace from Fred. The second match was a positive result as well, with Lyon picking up a solid 2–0 victory with goals from Juninho and Anthony Réveillère. With the result in the other match between Bayern and Fiorentina being a draw, this moved Lyon into first place in the group (on goal differential) heading into the final two matchdays.

With the group stage drawing to an end and injuries piling up, Lyon traveled to Florence to again face Fiorentina. Despite having injury troubles at the back of the defense, Lyon performed well and only conceded one goal, again from Alberto Gilardino, though at the time of the goal, Lyon were up 2–0 after goals from Jean Makoun and Karim Benzema. Despite chances from Juninho and Ederson, in which both players hit the post in amazing fashion, the scoreline remained as Lyon booked their place in the knockout stage. In the final group stage match, which decided what team would finish first place in the group, Bayern Munich defeated Lyon 2–3, scoring all three of their goals in the first half. Lyon controlled the second half with two goals from Sidney Govou and Benzema, but could not get a third to draw the match or a fourth to win the group. With this result, Lyon went through as second.

==== Group stage ====
Pos	Team	Pld	W	D	L	GF	GA	GD	Pts	Qualification
1	(Germany) Bayern Munich	6	4	2	0	12	4	+8	14	Advance to knockout phase
2	(France) Lyon	6	3	2	1	14	10	+4	11	Advance to knockout phase
3	(Italy) Fiorentina	6	1	3	2	5	8	−3	6	Transfer to UEFA Cup
4	(Romania) Steaua București	6	0	1	5	3	12	−9	1	

Source: RSSSF

===== Results by round =====
Round	1	2	3	4	5	6	7	8
Ground	H	A	A	H	A	H	H	A
Result	D	D	W	W	W	L	D	L

Source: uefa.com
A = Away; H = Home; W = Win; D = Draw; L = Loss

===== Matches =====
17 September 2008 1	Lyon (France)	2–2	(Italy) Fiorentina	Lyon, France
20:45	Piquionne 73'; Benzema 86'	Report	Gilardino 12', 42'	Stadium: Stade de Gerland; Attendance: 43,000; Referee: Peter Fröjdfeldt (Sweden)

30 September 2008 2	Bayern Munich (Germany)	1–1	(France) Lyon	Munich, Germany
20:45	Zé Roberto 52'	Report	Demichelis 25' (o.g.)	Stadium: Allianz Arena; Attendance: 64,000; Referee: Kyros Vassaras (Greece)

21 October 2008 3	Steaua București (Romania)	3–5	(France) Lyon	București, Romania
20:45	Arthuro 8'; Goian 11'; Ov. Petre 45'	Report	Keita 23'; Benzema 33', 71'; Fred 69', 90+2'	Stadium: Steaua; Attendance: 22,239; Referee: Grzegorz Gilewski (Poland)

5 November 2008 4	Lyon (France)	2–0	(Romania) Steaua București	Lyon, France
20:45	Juninho 44'; Réveillère 89'	Report		Stadium: Stade de Gerland; Attendance: 37,243; Referee: Manuel Mejuto González (Spain)

25 November 2008 5	Fiorentina (Italy)	1–2	(France) Lyon	Florence, Italy
20:45	Mutu (yellow card) 90+1'	Report	Makoun 15'; Benzema 27'	Stadium: Stadio Artemio Franchi; Attendance: 23,736; Referee: Viktor Kassai (Hungary)

10 December 2008 6	Lyon (France)	2–3	(Germany) Bayern Munich	Lyon, France
20:45	Govou 52'; Benzema 68'	Report	Klose 12', 37'; Ribéry 34'	Stadium: Stade de Gerland; Attendance: 38,349; Referee: Howard Webb (England)

==== First Knockout Round ====
For the six-straight season, Lyon reached the first knockout round. Due to finishing second, Lyon faced the danger of being paired with several big clubs that finished first in other groups. Notable clubs Lyon could have been paired with include Liverpool, Manchester United, Barcelona and Juventus to name a few. Following the draw, Lyon indeed received a tough draw, being given La Liga side Barcelona. Lyon and Barcelona were in the same group the previous Champions League season. Lyon lost to Barcelona 0–3 at the Camp Nou, but played well enough to earn a 2–2 draw at home.

In the opening leg at the Gerland, Lyon got off to a quick start scoring in just the seventh minute with a deceiving free kick, from an odd angle, by Juninho, which confused Barcelona goalkeeper Víctor Valdés and eventually with into the inside of the side netting. Lyon continued to perform well into the first half, with the defence constantly pressing Barcelona's attack and Lyon's offence missing on a variety of goal chances. Barcelona eventually got its equaliser from the head of Thierry Henry, drawing the match at 1–1. This was the final scoreline as Lyon headed into the second leg at the Camp Nou.

In the second leg, the exact opposite occurred, with Barcelona constantly pressurizing Lyon in the first half, leaving Barcelona to control the match with most of the possession occurring in Barça's attack. This showed as Barcelona earned first half goals from Henry twice, Lionel Messi and Samuel Eto'o, which effectively ended Lyon's chances of advancing to the quarter-finals, despite Jean Makoun and Juninho scoring back-to-back goals in the 44th and 48th minutes respectively. The final scoreline eventually was 2–5, eliminating Lyon from the Champion's League for the seventh consecutive season and for the third consecutive season in the Round of 16.

24 February 2009 First leg	Lyon (France)	1–1	(Spain) Barcelona	Lyon, France
20:45	Juninho 7'	Report	Henry 67'	Stadium: Stade de Gerland; Attendance: 39,258; Referee: Wolfgang Stark (Germany)

10 March 2009 Second leg	Barcelona (Spain)	5–2 (6–3 agg.)	(France) Lyon	Barcelona, Spain
20:45	Henry 25', 27'; Messi 40'; Eto'o 43'; Keita 90+5'	Report	Makoun 44'; Juninho 48'	Stadium: Camp Nou; Attendance: 86,368; Referee: Tom Henning Øvrebø (Norway)

== Start formations ==
Qnt	Formation	Match(es)
2	4-4-1-1	2, 13
7	4-4-2	3, 8, 11, 12, 14, 19, 20
12	4-2-3-1	1, 4, 6, 16, UCL 6, 21, CDF 2, 22, 25, CDF 3, 34, 36
27	4-3-3	5, UCL 1, 7, UCL 2, 9, UCL 3, 10, UCL 4, CDL 1, 15, UCL 5, 17, 18, CDF 1, 23, 24, UCL K1, 26, 27, UCL K2, 28, 29, 30, 31, 32, 33, 35, 37, 38

Last updated: 30 May 2009
Source: Match reports in Competitive matches
Only competitive matches.

=== Starting 11 ===
Note: Formation shown indicates formation used in
club's league match against Toulouse on May 30.

No.	Pos.	Nat.	Name	MS	Notes
1	GK	(France)	Lloris	45	
2	RB	(France)	Clerc	10	
15	CB	(Ghana)	Mensah	17	
5	CB	(France)	Bodmer	17	
6	LB	(Sweden)	Källström	28	
18	CM	(Bosnia and Herzegovina)	Pjanić	7	
28	DM	(France)	Toulalan	38	
17	CM	(Cameroon)	Makoun	36	
14	RW	(France)	Govou	17	
27	LW	(France)	Mounier	12	
10	FW	(France)	Benzema	40	

Last updated: 30 May 2009
Source: Squad stats and Start formations.
Only competitive matches.
Using the most used start formation.
Ordered by position on pitch (from back right to front left).

== Squad stats ==
=== Appearances and goals ===
Last updated on May 30, 2009.

No.	Pos	Nat	Player	Total		Ligue 1		Champions League		Coupe de la Ligue		Coupe de France	
No.	Pos	Nat	Player	Apps	Goals	Apps	Goals	Apps	Goals	Apps	Goals	Apps	Goals
1	GK	(France) FRA	Hugo Lloris	45	0	35	0	8	0	0	0	2	0
2	DF	(France) FRA	François Clerc	10	0	9	0	1	0	0	0	0	0
3	DF	(Brazil) BRA	Cris	44	3	34	2	6	0	1	1	3	0
4	DF	(France) FRA	Jean-Alain Boumsong	43	2	32	1	8	0	0	0	3	1
5	MF	(France) FRA	Mathieu Bodmer	20	0	17	0	3	0	0	0	0	0
6	MF	(Sweden) SWE	Kim Källström	41	2	32	2	6	0	1	0	2	0
7	MF	(Brazil) BRA	Ederson	45	5	35	5	8	0	1	0	1	0
8	MF	(Brazil) BRA	Juninho	38	10	29	7	7	3	1	0	1	0
10	FW	(France) FRA	Karim Benzema	46	23	36	17	8	5	0	0	2	1
11	DF	(Italy) ITA	Fabio Grosso	32	1	22	1	6	0	1	0	3	0
12	DF	(France) FRA	Timothée Kolodziejczak	1	0	1	0	0	0	0	0	0	0
13	MF	(France) FRA	Pierrick Valdivia	0	0	0	0	0	0	0	0	0	0
14	FW	(France) FRA	Sidney Govou	19	2	15	1	4	1	0	0	0	0
15	DF	(Ghana) GHA	John Mensah	17	0	12	0	4	0	0	0	1	0
17	MF	(Cameroon) CMR	Jean Makoun	46	9	35	7	8	1	1	0	2	1
18	MF	(Bosnia and Herzegovina) BIH	Miralem Pjanić	23	0	20	0	1	0	0	0	2	0
19	FW	(Argentina) ARG	César Delgado	27	3	20	2	4	0	0	0	3	1
20	DF	(France) FRA	Anthony Réveillère	23	1	19	0	4	1	0	0	0	0
22	MF	(France) FRA	Clément Grenier	0	0	0	0	0	0	0	0	0	0
23	FW	(Ivory Coast) CIV	Kader Keïta	29	3	21	1	5	1	1	0	2	1
25	GK	(France) FRA	Joan Hartock	0	0	0	0	0	0	0	0	0	0
26	MF	(Brazil) BRA	Fábio Santos	9	0	6	0	0	0	1	0	2	0
27	FW	(France) FRA	Anthony Mounier	26	5	18	2	4	0	1	0	3	3
28	MF	(France) FRA	Jérémy Toulalan	43	0	33	0	8	0	0	0	2	0
29	FW	(France) FRA	Yannis Tafer	4	0	3	0	0	0	0	0	1	0
30	GK	(France) FRA	Rémy Vercoutre	5	0	3	0	0	0	1	0	1	0
31	MF	(France) FRA	Saïd Mehamha	0	0	0	0	0	0	0	0	0	0
32	DF	(France) FRA	Lamine Gassama	10	0	7	0	1	0	1	0	1	0
34	FW	(France) FRA	Jérémy Pied	0	0	0	0	0	0	0	0	0	0
35	DF	(France) FRA	Thomas Fontaine	0	0	0	0	0	0	0	0	0	0
36	DF	(France) FRA	Sébastien Faure	1	0	0	0	0	0	1	0	0	0
38	FW	(France) FRA	Alexandre Lacazette	0	0	0	0	0	0	0	0	0	0
39	FW	(France) FRA	Frédéric Piquionne	26	4	19	2	3	1	1	0	3	1
Players sold/retired after the start of the season:
9	FW	(Brazil) BRA	Fred	20	4	15	2	4	2	1	0	0	0

=== Other statistics ===
Last updated May 30, 2009

Note: For all competitive competitions

No.	Pos.	Nationality	Player	Assists	Minutes Played	Yellow card	Yellow card Red card	Red card
1	GK	France	Hugo Lloris	0	4070	1	0	0
2	DF	France	François Clerc	0	805	0	0	0
3	DF	Brazil	Cris	1	3898	10	0	0
4	DF	France	Jean-Alain Boumsong	1	3411	3	0	0
5	MF	France	Mathieu Bodmer	0	1472	0	0	0
6	MF	Sweden	Kim Källström	5	2710	4	0	0
7	MF	Brazil	Ederson	2	2823	4	0	0
8	MF	Brazil	Juninho	6	2679	8	1	1
9	FW	Brazil	Fred	1	1147	2	0	0
10	FW	France	Karim Benzema	4	3435	2	0	0
11	DF	Italy	Fabio Grosso	2	2748	11	0	0
12	DF	France	Timothée Kolodziejczak	0	79	1	0	0
13	MF	France	Pierrick Valdivia	0	0	0	0	0
14	FW	France	Sidney Govou	1	1284	5	1	0
15	DF	Ghana	John Mensah	0	1345	3	2	0
17	DF	Cameroon	Jean Makoun	3	3650	8	0	0
18	MF	Bosnia and Herzegovina	Miralem Pjanić	1	714	2	0	0
19	MF	Argentina	César Delgado	3	1450	4	0	0
20	DF	France	Anthony Réveillère	0	1952	4	0	0
22	MF	France	Clément Grenier	0	0	0	0	0
23	FW	Ivory Coast	Kader Keïta	1	1653	2	1	0
25	GK	France	Joan Hartock	0	0	0	0	0
26	MF	Brazil	Fábio Santos	0	485	0	0	0
27	FW	France	Anthony Mounier	2	1006	0	0	0
28	MF	France	Jérémy Toulalan	2	3776	9	0	0
29	FW	France	Yannis Tafer	1	51	0	0	0
30	GK	France	Rémy Vercoutre	0	450	0	0	0
31	MF	France	Saïd Mehamha	0	0	0	0	0
32	DF	France	Lamine Gassama	0	862	4	0	0
34	FW	France	Jérémy Pied	0	0	0	0	0
35	DF	France	Thomas Fontaine	0	0	0	0	0
36	DF	France	Sébastien Faure	0	90	1	0	0
38	FW	France	Alexandre Lacazette	0	0	0	0	0
39	FW	France	Frédéric Piquionne	1	926	3	1	0
