= 2005–06 Olympique Lyonnais season =

Lyon
2005–06 season
- Owner: OL Groupe
- President: Jean-Michel Aulas
- Head coach: Gérard Houllier
- Stadium: Stade de Gerland
- Ligue 1: 1st
- Coupe de France: Quarter-finals
- Coupe de la Ligue: Round of 32
- Trophée des Champions: Winners
- Champions League: Quarter-finals
- Top goalscorer: League: Fred (14); All: Fred (17)
- Highest home attendance: 40,300 vs. Real Madrid (13 September 2005)
- Lowest home attendance: 29,026 vs. Bastia (21 March 2006)
- Average home league attendance: 38,535
Home colours	Away colours	Third colours

The 2005–06 season was the 107th season in the existence of Olympique Lyonnais and the club's 17th consecutive season in the top flight of French football. They participated in the Ligue 1, the Coupe de France, the Coupe de la Ligue, the Trophée des Champions and UEFA Champions League.

== First-team squad ==
Squad at end of season

Note: Flags indicate national team as defined under FIFA eligibility rules; some limited exceptions apply. Players may hold more than one non-FIFA nationality.

No.	Pos.	Nation	Player
1	GK	FRA	Grégory Coupet
2	DF	FRA	Abdullah Bidav
3	DF	BRA	Cris
4	DF	SUI	Patrick Müller
5	DF	BRA	Caçapa (captain)
6	MF	FRA	Jérémy Clément
7	MF	MLI	Mahamadou Diarra
8	MF	BRA	Juninho Pernambucano
9	FW	NOR	John Carew
10	MF	FRA	Florent Malouda
11	FW	BRA	Fred
12	DF	FRA	Anthony Réveillère
14	MF	FRA	Sidney Govou
15	DF	SEN	Lamine Diatta
18	MF	FRA	Hatem Ben Arfa
19	FW	FRA	Karim Benzema
20	DF	FRA	Eric Abidal

No.	Pos.	Nation	Player
21	MF	POR	Tiago
22	FW	FRA	Sylvain Wiltord
23	DF	FRA	Jérémy Berthod
24	DF	FRA	Sylvain Monsoreau
25	GK	FRA	Joan Hartock
26	MF	FRA	Benoît Pedretti
22	FW	FRA	Grégory Bettiol
30	GK	FRA	Rémy Vercoutre
31	DF	FRA	François Clerc
32	MF	FRA	Romain Beynié
35	GK	FRA	Rémy Riou
37	DF	FRA	Sandy Paillot
38	DF	FRA	Mourad Benhamida
39	MF	FRA	Aurelien Brugniaud
40	MF	FRA	Anthony Mounier

=== Left club during season ===
Note: Flags indicate national team as defined under FIFA eligibility rules; some limited exceptions apply. Players may hold more than one non-FIFA nationality.

No.	Pos.	Nation	Player
16	ATT	FRA	Abdullah Bidav (to Lyonais)
11	FW	BRA	Nilmar (on loan to Corinthians)
13	FW	FRA	Pierre-Alain Frau (on loan to Lens)

No.	Pos.	Nation	Player
27	DF	FRA	Johann Truchet (on loan to Reims)
34	FW	FRA	Julien Viale (to Istres)
36	DF	FRA	Alexis Genet (to Saarbrücken)

== Competitions ==
=== Overview ===
Competition	First match	Last match	Starting round	Final position	Record							
Competition	First match	Last match	Starting round	Final position	Pld	W	D	L	GF	GA	GD	Win %
Ligue 1	31 July 2005	13 May 2006	Matchday 1	Winners	38	25	9	4	73	31	+42	65.79
Coupe de France	8 January 2006	11 April 2006	Round of 64	Quarter-finals	4	3	0	1	8	3	+5	75.00
Coupe de la Ligue	25 October 2005		Round of 32	Round of 32	1	0	1	0	1	1	+0	0.00
Trophée des Champions	25 July 2005		Final	Winners	1	1	0	0	4	1	+3	100.00
UEFA Champions League	13 September 2005	4 April 2006	Group stage	Quarter-finals	10	7	2	1	19	7	+12	70.00
Total					54	36	12	6	105	43	+62	66.67

Source: Competitions

=== Trophée des Champions ===
27 July 2005 Final	Auxerre	1–4	Lyon	Auxerre
20:00 CEST (UTC+2)	Mathis 7'		Ben Arfa 1' (pen.); Carew 33', 67', 72'	Stadium: Stade de l'Abbé-Deschamps; Attendance: 10,967; Referee: Pascal Viléo

=== Ligue 1 ===
==== League table ====
Pos	Team	Pld	W	D	L	GF	GA	GD	Pts	Qualification or relegation
1	Lyon (C)	38	25	9	4	73	31	+42	84	Qualification to Champions League group stage
2	Bordeaux	38	18	15	5	43	25	+18	69	Qualification to Champions League group stage
3	Lille	38	16	14	8	56	31	+25	62	Qualification to Champions League third qualifying round
4	Lens	38	14	18	6	48	34	+14	60	Qualification to UEFA Cup first round
5	Marseille	38	16	12	10	44	35	+9	60	Qualification to Intertoto Cup third round

Source: Ligue 1
Rules for classification: 1) points; 2) goal difference; 3) number of goals scored.
(C) Champions

==== Results summary ====
Overall								Home						Away					
Pld	W	D	L	GF	GA	GD	Pts	W	D	L	GF	GA	GD	W	D	L	GF	GA	GD
38	22	13	3	56	22	+34	79	13	5	1	33	10	+23	9	8	2	23	12	+11

Source: Ligue 1

==== Results by round ====
Round	1	2	3	4	5	6	7	8	9	10	11	12	13	14	15	16	17	18	19	20	21	22	23	24	25	26	27	28	29	30	31	32	33	34	35	36	37	38
Ground	A	H	A	H	A	H	A	H	A	H	A	H	A	H	A	H	A	H	A	H	A	H	A	H	A	A	H	H	A	H	A	H	A	H	A	H	A	H
Result	W	W	D	W	W	W	D	D	W	W	W	W	W	W	W	D	W	D	L	W	W	W	D	D	D	W	L	W	W	W	D	W	W	W	L	W	L	W
Position	4	4	3	2	1	1	1	1	1	1	1	1	1	1	1	1	1	1	1	1	1	1	1	1	1	1	1	1	1	1	1	1	1	1	1	1	1	1

Source: Ligue 1
A = Away; H = Home; W = Win; D = Draw; L = Loss

==== Matches ====
31 July 2005 1	Le Mans	1–2	Lyon	Le Mans
20:00 CEST (UTC+2)	de Melo 56'	Report	Wiltord 36'; Carew 57'	Stadium: Stade Léon-Bollée; Attendance: 13,134; Referee: Hervé Piccirillo

7 August 2005 2	Lyon	1–0	Strasbourg	Lyon
20:45 CEST (UTC+2)	Carew 26'	Report		Stadium: Stade de Gerland; Attendance: 37,680; Referee: Bertrand Layec

14 August 2005 3	Marseille	1–1	Lyon	Marseille
20:45 CEST (UTC+2)	Taiwo 6'	Report	Carew 35'	Stadium: Stade Vélodrome; Attendance: 57,609; Referee: Laurent Duhamel

20 August 2005 4	Lyon	1–0	Nancy	Lyon
20:00 CEST (UTC+2)	Caçapa 90+3'	Report		Stadium: Stade de Gerland; Attendance: 38,938; Referee: Stéphane Moulin

28 August 2005 5	Auxerre	0–2	Lyon	Auxerre
20:45 CEST (UTC+2)		Report	Diarra 5'; Juninho 44'	Stadium: Stade de l'Abbé-Deschamps; Attendance: 14,276; Referee: Stéphane Bre

10 September 2005 6	Lyon	2–1	Monaco	Lyon
17:15 CEST (UTC+2)	Fred 5', 49'	Report	Kapo (yellow card) 34' (yellow-red card) 55'; Gigliotti 79'	Stadium: Stade de Gerland; Attendance: 39,043; Referee: Hervé Piccirillo

17 September 2005 7	Bordeaux	1–1	Lyon	Bordeaux
17:45 CEST (UTC+2)	Šmicer 7'	Report	Wiltord 64'	Stadium: Stade Chaban-Delmas; Attendance: 32,020; Referee: Bruno Derrien

22 September 2005 8	Lyon	1–1	Lens	Lyon
20:45 CEST (UTC+2)	Tiago 38'	Report	Coulibaly 5'	Stadium: Stade de Gerland; Attendance: 36,337; Referee: Damien Ledentu

25 September 2005 9	Nantes	0–1	Lyon	Nantes
20:45 CEST (UTC+2)		Report	Diatta (yellow card) 14' (yellow-red card) 89'; Fred 80'	Stadium: Stade de la Beaujoire; Attendance: 33,289; Referee: Philippe Malige

2 October 2005 10	Rennes	1–3	Lyon	Rennes
18:00 CEST (UTC+2)	Källström 10'	Report	Juninho 53'; Tiago 74'; Wiltord 87'	Stadium: Stade de la Route de Lorient; Attendance: 28,998; Referee: Bruno Coue

16 October 2005 11	Lyon	3–2	Ajaccio	Lyon
18:00 CEST (UTC+2)	Fred 29'; Juninho 50'; Wiltord 70'	Report	Diawara 35'; Tiago 53' (o.g.)	Stadium: Stade de Gerland; Attendance: 36,347; Referee: Fredy Fautrel

22 October 2005 12	Metz	0–4	Lyon	Metz
17:15 CEST (UTC+2)		Report	Carew 23'; Juninho 36'; Wiltord 44'; Malouda 51'	Stadium: Stade Saint-Symphorien; Attendance: 19,333; Referee: Pascal Garibian

29 October 2005 13	Lyon	1–0	Sochaux	Lyon
20:00 CEST (UTC+2)	Malouda 53'	Report		Stadium: Stade de Gerland; Attendance: 40,117; Referee: Olivier Thual

5 November 2005 14	Toulouse	0–1	Lyon	Toulouse
17:15 CET (UTC+1)		Report	Govou 10'	Stadium: Stadium de Toulouse; Attendance: 28,254; Referee: Alain Hamer

19 November 2005 15	Lyon	2–1	Troyes	Lyon
20:00 CET (UTC+1)	Cris 28', 76'	Report	Nivet 21'	Stadium: Stade de Gerland; Attendance: 37,940; Referee: Saïd Ennjimi

26 November 2005 16	Nice	1–1	Lyon	Nice
20:00 CET (UTC+1)	Bagayoko 22'	Report	Govou 75'	Stadium: Stade du Ray; Attendance: 12,827; Referee: Alain Sars

3 December 2005 17	Lyon	2–0	Paris Saint-Germain	Lyon
21:00 CET (UTC+1)	Fred 5'; Carew 90+2'	Report		Stadium: Stade de Gerland; Attendance: 38,134; Referee: Bertrand Layec

11 December 2005 18	Saint-Étienne	0–0	Lyon	Saint-Étienne
21:00 CET (UTC+1)		Report		Stadium: Stade Geoffroy-Guichard; Attendance: 33,352; Referee: Stéphane Bre

16 December 2005 19	Lyon	1–3	Lille	Lyon
20:45 CET (UTC+1)	Govou 69'	Report	Odemwingie 9'; Debuchy 62'; Dumont 70'	Stadium: Stade de Gerland; Attendance: 38,021; Referee: Laurent Duhamel

4 January 2006 20	Strasbourg	0–4	Lyon	Strasbourg
18:15 CET (UTC+1)		Report	Wiltord 5', 56', 73'; Berthod 42'	Stadium: Stade de la Meinau; Attendance: 19,567; Referee: Alain Sars

11 January 2006 21	Lyon	2–1	Marseille	Lyon
21:00 CET (UTC+1)	Tiago 54'; Govou 82'	Report	Lamouchi 18', (yellow card) 81' (yellow-red card) 84'	Stadium: Stade de Gerland; Attendance: 38,912; Referee: Pascal Garibian

14 January 2006 22	Nancy	0–2	Lyon	Tomblaine
17:15 CET (UTC+1)		Report	Caçapa 48'; Fred 82'	Stadium: Stade Marcel Picot; Attendance: 19,126; Referee: Damien Ledentu

22 January 2006 23	Lyon	1–1	Auxerre	Lyon
20:45 CET (UTC+1)	Diarra 43'	Report	Luyindula 89'	Stadium: Stade de Gerland; Attendance: 37,958; Referee: Claude Colombo

5 February 2006 25	Lyon	0–0	Bordeaux	Lyon
21:00 CET (UTC+1)		Report		Stadium: Stade de Gerland; Attendance: 39,354; Referee: Stéphane Bre

11 February 2006 26	Lens	1–1	Lyon	Lens
17:15 CET (UTC+1)	Jussiê 56'	Report	Wiltord 90+1'	Stadium: Stade Félix-Bollaert; Attendance: 40,037; Referee: Bruno Coue

17 February 2006 27	Lyon	3–1	Nantes	Lyon
20:45 CET (UTC+1)	Juninho 9'; Diarra 35'; Fred 56'	Report	Diallo 734'	Stadium: Stade de Gerland; Attendance: 38,393; Referee: Damien Ledentu

25 February 2006 28	Lyon	1–4	Rennes	Lyon
20:00 CET (UTC+1)	Juninho 38' (pen.)	Report	Utaka 20', 52', 72'; Gourcuff 32'	Stadium: Stade de Gerland; Attendance: 39,168; Referee: Thierry Auriac

4 March 2006 29	Ajaccio	1–3	Lyon	Ajaccio
20:00 CET (UTC+1)	Lucas Pereira 84'	Report	Juninho 62'; Fred 78'; Benzema 88'	Stadium: Stade François Coty; Attendance: 4,037; Referee: Bertrand Layec

11 March 2006 30	Lyon	4–0	Metz	Lyon
20:00 CET (UTC+1)	Malouda 13', 34'; Carew 16'; Müller 90+1'	Report		Stadium: Stade de Gerland; Attendance: 37,000; Referee: Stéphane Lannoy

18 March 2006 31	Sochaux	0–4	Lyon	Montbéliard
20:00 CET (UTC+1)		Report	Wiltord 26', 53'; Pedretti 45'; Malouda 58'	Stadium: Stade Auguste Bonal; Attendance: 18,770; Referee: Alain Sars

25 March 2006 32	Lyon	1–1	Toulouse	Lyon
17:15 CET (UTC+1)	Carew 49'	Report	Moreira 44'	Stadium: Stade de Gerland; Attendance: 39,794; Referee: Pascal Garibian

1 April 2006 33	Troyes	0–1	Lyon	Troyes
17:15 CEST (UTC+2)		Report	Tiago 76'	Stadium: Stade de l'Aube; Attendance: 17,835; Referee: Olivier Thual

8 April 2006 34	Lyon	2–1	Nice	Lyon
20:00 CEST (UTC+2)	Fred 23'; Malouda 521'	Report	Ederson 39'	Stadium: Stade de Gerland; Attendance: 38,545; Referee: Hervé Piccirillo

16 April 2006 35	Paris Saint-Germain	0–1	Lyon	Paris
21:00 CEST (UTC+2)		Report	Fred 24'	Stadium: Parc des Princes; Attendance: 43,128; Referee: Stéphane Bré

23 April 2006 24	Monaco	2–1	Lyon	Monaco
20:45 CEST (UTC+2)	Chevantón 32'; Di Vaio 57'	Report	Carew 90+5'	Stadium: Stade Louis II; Attendance: 16,053; Referee: Pascal Garibian

30 April 2006 36	Lyon	4–0	Saint-Étienne	Lyon
21:00 CEST (UTC+2)	Hellebuyck 8' (o.g.); Fred 40'; Juninho 56' (pen.); Pedretti 81'	Report		Stadium: Stade de Gerland; Attendance: 39,081; Referee: Stéphane Lannoy

6 May 2006 37	Lille	4–0	Lyon	Villeneuve-d'Ascq
20:00 CEST (UTC+2)	Dernis 35'; Odewingie 49', 51'; Makouon 86'	Report		Stadium: Stadium Lille Métropole; Attendance: 17,143; Referee: Damien Ledentu

13 May 2006 38	Lyon	8–1	Le Mans	Lyon
20:00 CEST (UTC+2)	Fred 19', 40', 77'; Cris 27'; Wiltord 30'; Juninho 43'; Govou 86'; Tiago 88'	Report	Grafite 15'	Stadium: Stade de Gerland; Attendance: 40,426; Referee: Claude Colombo

=== Coupe de France ===
8 January 2006 Round of 64	Grenoble	0–4	Lyon	Grenoble
15:45 CET (UTC+1)			Benzema 23', 30'; Diarra 51'; Ben Arfa 77'	Stadium: Stade Lesdiguières; Attendance: 11,200; Referee: Philippe Malige

1 February 2006 Round of 32	Ajaccio	1–2 (a.e.t.)	Lyon	Ajaccio
18:00 CET (UTC+1)	Chafni 94'		Cris 108'; Govou 113'	Stadium: Stade François Coty; Attendance: 5,000; Referee: Hervé Piccirillo

21 March 2006 Round of 16	Lyon	1–0	Bastia	Lyon
21:00 CET (UTC+1)	Juninho 56'			Stadium: Stade de Gerland; Attendance: 29,026; Referee: Philippe Kalt

11 April 2006 Quarter-finals	Lyon	1–2	Marseille	Lyon
21:00 CEST (UTC+2)	Fred 21'		Maoulida 17'; Niang 65'; Taiwo (red card) 90'	Stadium: Stade de Gerland; Attendance: 38,885; Referee: Bertrand Layec

=== Coupe de la Ligue ===
25 October 2005 Round of 32	Nantes	1–1 (4–3 p)	Lyon	Nantes
21:00 CEST (UTC+2)	Diallo 30'		Govou 90'	Stadium: Stade de la Beaujoire; Attendance: 28,025; Referee: Stéphane Bré
	Penalties
	Toulalan (penalty scored); Cetto (penalty scored); Glombard (penalty scored); Dimitrijević (penalty scored)		Diarra (penalty scored); Fred (penalty scored); Monsoreau (penalty scored); Carew (penalty missed); Malouda (penalty missed)

=== UEFA Champions League ===
==== Group stage ====
Pos	Team	Pld	W	D	L	GF	GA	GD	Pts	Qualification
1	(France) Lyon	6	5	1	0	13	4	+9	16	Advance to knockout stage
2	(Spain) Real Madrid	6	3	1	2	10	8	+2	10	Advance to knockout stage
3	(Norway) Rosenborg	6	1	1	4	6	11	−5	4	Transfer to UEFA Cup
4	(Greece) Olympiacos	6	1	1	4	7	13	−6	4	

Source: RSSSF

13 September 2005 1	Lyon (France)	3–0	(Spain) Real Madrid	Lyon, France
20:45 CEST (UTC+2)	Carew 21'; Juninho 26'; Wiltord 31'	Report		Stadium: Stade de Gerland; Attendance: 40,300; Referee: Massimo De Santis (Italy)

28 September 2005 2	Rosenborg (Norway)	0–1	(France) Lyon	Trondheim, Norway
20:45 CEST (UTC+2)		Report	Cris 45+1'	Stadium: Lerkendal Stadion; Attendance: 20,620; Referee: Yuri Baskakov (Russia)

19 October 2005 3	Lyon (France)	2–1	(Greece) Olympiacos	Lyon, France
20:45 CEST (UTC+2)	Juninho 4'; Govou 89'	Report	Kafes 84'	Stadium: Stade de Gerland; Attendance: 35,000; Referee: Graham Poll (England)

1 November 2005 4	Olympiacos (Greece)	1–4	(France) Lyon	Piraeus, Greece
21:45 CEST (UTC+2)	Babangida 3'	Report	Juninho 41'; Carew 44', 57'; Diarra 55'	Stadium: Karaiskakis Stadium; Attendance: 33,500; Referee: Peter Fröjdfeldt (Sweden)

23 November 2005 5	Real Madrid (Spain)	1–1	(France) Lyon	Madrid, Spain
20:45 CET (UTC+1)	Guti 41'	Report	Carew 72'	Stadium: Santiago Bernabéu Stadium; Attendance: 65,000; Referee: Frank De Bleeckere (Belgium)

6 December 2005 6	Lyon (France)	2–1	(Norway) Rosenborg	Lyon, France
20:45 CET (UTC+1)	Benzema 33'; Fred 90+3'	Report	Braaten 68'	Stadium: Stade de Gerland; Attendance: 40,425; Referee: Arturo Daudén Ibáñez (Spain)

==== Knockout stage ====
===== Round of 16 =====
21 February 2006 First leg	PSV Eindhoven (Netherlands)	0–1	(France) Lyon	Eindhoven, Netherlands
20:45 CET (UTC+1)		Report	Juninho 65'	Stadium: Philips Stadion; Attendance: 35,000; Referee: Kyros Vassaras (Greece)

8 March 2006 Second leg	Lyon (France)	4–0 (5–0 agg.)	(Netherlands) PSV Eindhoven	Lyon, France
20:45 CET (UTC+1)	Tiago 26', 45+4'; Wiltord 71'; Fred 90'	Report		Stadium: Stade de Gerland; Attendance: 35,000; Referee: Mike Riley (England)

===== Quarter-finals =====
29 March 2006 First leg	Lyon (France)	0–0	(Italy) Milan	Lyon, France
20:45 CEST (UTC+2)		Report		Stadium: Stade de Gerland; Attendance: 39,300; Referee: Konrad Plautz (Austria)

4 April 2006 Second leg	Milan (Italy)	3–1 (3–1 agg.)	(France) Lyon	Milan, Italy
20:45 CEST (UTC+2)	Inzaghi 25', 88'; Shevchenko 90+3'	Report	Diarra 31'	Stadium: San Siro; Attendance: 78,900; Referee: Terje Hauge (Norway)

== Squad statistics ==
=== Appearances and goals ===
No.	Pos	Nat	Player	Total		Ligue 1		Coupe de France		Coupe de la Ligue		Trophée des Champions		Champions League	
No.	Pos	Nat	Player	Apps	Goals	Apps	Goals	Apps	Goals	Apps	Goals	Apps	Goals	Apps	Goals
1	GK	(France) FRA	Grégory Coupet	51	0	37	0	4	0	0	0	1	0	9	0
3	DF	(Brazil) BRA	Cris	50	5	36	3	4	1	0	0	0	0	10	1
4	DF	(Switzerland) SUI	Patrick Müller	16	1	12	1	2	0	0	0	0	0	2	0
5	DF	(Brazil) BRA	Caçapa (captain)	36	2	26	2	2	0	0	0	1	0	7	0
6	DF	(France) FRA	Jeremy Clement	26	0	15	0	3	0	1	0	1	0	6	0
7	MF	(Mali) MLI	Mahamadou Diarra	45	6	32	3	2	1	1	0	1	0	9	2
8	MF	(Brazil) BRA	Juninho Pernambucano	44	14	32	9	4	1	0	0	0	0	8	4
9	FW	(Norway) NOR	John Carew	40	15	26	8	2	0	1	0	1	3	10	4
10	FW	(France) FRA	Florent Malouda	45	6	31	6	3	0	1	0	1	0	9	0
11	FW	(Brazil) BRA	Fred	45	17	31	14	4	1	1	0	0	0	9	2
12	DF	(France) FRA	Anthony Réveillère	30	0	20	0	3	0	0	0	0	0	7	0
13	FW	(France) FRA	Pierre-Alain Frau	6	0	4	0	0	0	1	0	1	0	0	0
14	FW	(France) FRA	Sidney Govou	47	8	35	5	3	1	1	1	1	0	7	1
15	DF	(Senegal) SEN	Lamine Diatta	16	0	12	0	1	0	1	0	1	0	1	0
18	FW	(France) FRA	Hatem Ben Arfa	16	2	12	0	2	1	0	0	1	1	1	0
19	FW	(France) FRA	Karim Benzema	16	4	13	1	2	2	0	0	0	0	1	1
20	DF	(France) FRA	Eric Abidal	23	0	15	0	1	0	1	0	0	0	6	0
21	MF	(Portugal) POR	Tiago Mendes	40	7	29	5	3	0	0	0	0	0	8	2
22	FW	(France) FRA	Sylvain Wiltord	48	14	35	12	3	0	0	0	0	0	10	2
23	DF	(France) FRA	Jérémy Berthod	20	1	16	1	0	0	1	0	1	0	2	0
24	DF	(France) FRA	Sylvain Monsoreau	24	0	18	0	2	0	1	0	1	0	2	0
26	MF	(France) FRA	Benoît Pedretti	30	2	21	2	2	0	1	0	1	0	5	0
30	GK	(France) FRA	Rémy Vercoutre	4	0	2	0	0	0	1	0	0	0	1	0
31	DF	(France) FRA	François Clerc	22	0	14	0	2	0	1	0	0	0	5	0
32	FW	(France) FRA	Romain Beynié	1	0	0	0	0	0	0	0	0	0	1	0
-	FW	(Brazil) BRA	Nilmar	1	0	0	0	0	0	0	0	1	0	0	0
