= 2007 Trophée des Champions =

- Event: Trophée des Champions
Lyon	Sochaux
2	1
- Date: 28 July 2007
- Venue: Stade de Gerland, Lyon, France
- Man of the Match: Cris
- Referee: Sandryk Biton
- Attendance: 30,413

The 2007 Trophée des Champions was a football match held at Stade Gerland, Lyon on 28 July 2007, that saw 2006–07 Ligue 1 champions Lyon defeat 2006–07 Coupe de France winners Sochaux 2–1 thanks to goals by Sidney Govou and Cris.

== Match details ==
28 July 2007
17:50 CET

Lyon	2–1	Sochaux
Govou 21'; Cris 43'	Report	Birsa 13'

Stade Gerland, Lyon
Attendance: 30,413
Referee: Sandryk Biton

Lyon	Sochaux

GK	1	(France) Grégory Coupet
RB	2	(France) François Clerc		(substituted off) 81'
CB	4	(Switzerland) Patrick Müller
CB	3	(Brazil) Cris (c)
LB	20	(France) Anthony Réveillère
RM	14	(France) Sidney Govou
CM	6	(Sweden) Kim Källström
CM	28	(France) Jérémy Toulalan	(yellow card) 69'
LM	23	(Ivory Coast) Kader Keïta		(substituted off) 67'
FW	7	(Czech Republic) Milan Baroš		(substituted off) 67'
FW	10	(France) Karim Benzema
Substitutes:
GK	30	(France) Rémy Vercoutre
DF	11	(Italy) Fabio Grosso		(substituted on) 81'
DF	32	(France) Sandy Paillot
MF	5	(France) Mathieu Bodmer		(substituted on) 67'
MF	18	(France) Hatem Ben Arfa		(substituted on) 67'
MF	26	(Brazil) Fábio Santos
FW	12	(France) Loïc Rémy
Manager:
(France) Alain Perrin

GK	16	(France) Teddy Richert (c)
RB	2	(Nigeria) Rabiu Afolabi
CB	14	(Slovenia) Bojan Jokic	(yellow card) 69'
CB	23	(Morocco) Hakim El Bounadi
LB	28	(France) Stéphane Pichot
RM	7	(France) Romain Pitau
CM	12	(France) Michaël Isabey
CM	19	(Senegal) Badara Sène	(yellow card) 55'	(substituted off) 73'
LM	6	(France) Stéphane Dalmat		(substituted off) 85'
FW	4	(France) Sébastien Grax
FW	20	(Slovenia) Valter Birsa		(substituted off) 52'
Substitutes:
GK	30	(France) Matthieu Dreyer
DF	34	(France) Maxime Josse
MF	29	(France) Vincent Nogueira
FW	10	(Brazil) Alvaro Santos		(substituted on) 85'
FW	11	(France) Julien Quercia		(substituted on) 73'
FW	26	(Turkey) Mevlüt Erdinç	(yellow card) 57'	(substituted on) 52'
Manager:
(France) Frédéric Hantz

Match officials

- Assistant referees:
  - Jean-Marie Cazali
  - Eric Dansault
- Fourth official: Gaël Lecellier

Man of the Match:

- Cris (Lyon)

Match rules

- 90 minutes.
- 30 minutes extra-time (15-minute intervals)
- Penalty shoot-out if scores level after extra time.
- Seven named substitutes
- Maximum of 3 substitutions.

== See also ==
- 2007–08 Ligue 1
- 2007–08 Coupe de France
- 2007–08 Olympique Lyonnais season
