= Anthony Réveillère =

French footballer (born 1979)

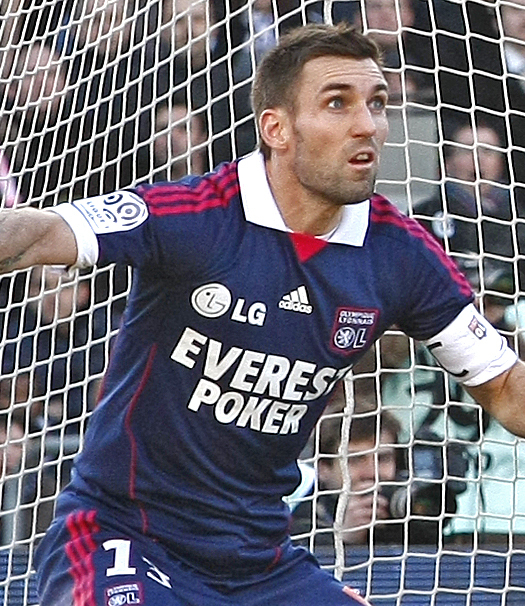
- Réveillère playing for Lyon in 2012

Personal information
- Full name: Anthony Guy Marie Réveillère
- Date of birth: 10 November 1979 (age 46)
- Place of birth: Doué-la-Fontaine, France
- Height: 1.81 m (5 ft 11 in)
- Position: Right-back

Youth career
- 1985–1992: SO Vihiers
- 1992–1996: Angers
- 1996–1998: Rennes

Senior career*
Years	Team	Apps	(Gls)
1998–2003	Rennes	140	(2)
2003	→ Valencia (loan)	18	(1)
2003–2013	Lyon	286	(3)
2013–2014	Napoli	13	(0)
2014–2015	Sunderland	16	(0)
Total		473	(6)

International career
1995–1996	France U17	20	(1)
1996–1997	France U18	6	(0)
1999–2002	France U21	24	(1)
2003–2012	France	20	(1)

Managerial career
- 2019–2020: MDA Chasselay (sporting director)
- 2020–2021: GOAL FC (sporting director)
Medal record
Men's football
Representing France
UEFA European Under-21 Championship
Runner-up	2002
- * Club domestic league appearances and goals

Anthony Guy Marie Réveillère (born 10 November 1979) is a French former professional footballer who played as a right-back.

He spent most of his professional career with Rennes and Lyon, amassing Ligue 1 totals of 426 matches and five goals during 16 seasons and winning 12 major titles with the latter club, including five national championships.

Réveillère played 20 times with France, representing the nation at the 2010 FIFA World Cup and UEFA Euro 2012.

== Club career ==
=== Rennes ===
Born in Doué-la-Fontaine, Maine-et-Loire, Réveillère finished his formation with Stade Rennais FC, making his Ligue 1 debut with the club on 3 February 1998 in a 0–0 away draw against SC Bastia. He spent six years with the team always in the top division, and was also loaned to Valencia CF in La Liga in January 2003.

=== Lyon ===
Réveillère joined Olympique Lyonnais in summer 2003, scoring one goal in 31 games in his first season to win the first of his consecutive five championships with the side. Except for the 2008–09 campaign, where he suffered an anterior cruciate ligament injury and could only feature in 19 league contests, he was always first-choice for L'OL.

Réveillère played in 77 UEFA Champions League matches during his tenure with Lyon (two goals), being present when his team ousted Real Madrid in the 2009–10 edition.

=== Napoli ===
On 8 November 2013, free agent Réveillère joined Italian side S.S.C. Napoli. He made his Serie A debut on 19 January of the following year by featuring the full 90 minutes in a 2–2 draw at Bologna F.C. 1909, and finished his only season with 18 appearances all competitions comprised.

=== Sunderland ===
On 23 October 2014, Réveillère signed with Premier League club Sunderland on a one-year deal.

On 9 November 2015, he announced his retirement from professional football.

== International career ==
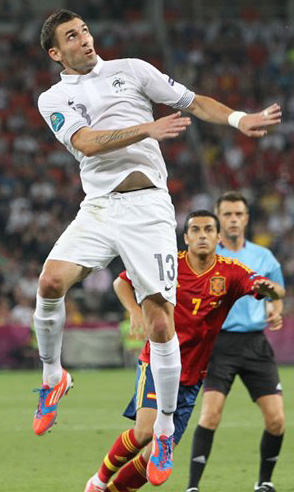
Réveillère playing for France at Euro 2012

Réveillère earned his first cap for France on 11 October 2003, in a 3–0 win against Israel for the UEFA Euro 2004 qualifiers. He was picked for the squads that competed at both the 2010 FIFA World Cup and Euro 2012, being an unused squad member in the former and appearing in the 0–2 quarter-final loss to Spain in the latter.

Réveillère scored his only goal for Les Bleus on 7 October 2011, contributing to a 3–0 home triumph over Albania for the Euro 2012 qualifying stage.

== Post-retirement ==
At the end of October 2019, Réveillère was appointed sporting director of MDA Chasselay. In the summer of 2020, the club changed its name to GOAL FC. At the end of May 2022, Réveillère announced that he would leave the club. In the last year before his departure, Réveillère worked as an advisor to the club's president, Jocelyn Fontanel.

In July 2023, Réveillère was hired as a consultant for Olympique Lyonnais's official video platform, OLPLAY.

== Career statistics ==
=== Club ===
Appearances and goals by club, season and competition
Club	Season	League			National cup (Note: Coupe de France, Coppa Italia.)		League cup		Europe (Note: UEFA Champions League, UEFA Europa League)		Total	
Club	Season	Division	Apps	Goals	Apps	Goals	Apps	Goals	Apps	Goals	Apps	Goals
Rennes	1998–99	Ligue 1	8	0	–		–		–		8	0
Rennes	1999–2000	Ligue 1	32	0	–		–		–		32	0
Rennes	2000–01	Ligue 1	16	0	–		–		–		16	0
Rennes	2001–02	Ligue 1	32	1	–		–		–		32	1
Rennes	2002–03	Ligue 1	20	1	–		–		–		20	1
Rennes	Total		140	2	0	0	0	0	0	0	140	2
Valencia (loan)	2002–03	La Liga	18	1	–		–		6	0	26	1
Lyon	2003–04	Ligue 1	31	1	0	0	0	0	8	0	39	1
Lyon	2004–05	Ligue 1	33	0	2	0	0	0	8	0	43	0
Lyon	2005–06	Ligue 1	20	0	2	0	0	0	7	0	29	0
Lyon	2006–07	Ligue 1	30	0	2	0	0	0	7	0	39	0
Lyon	2007–08	Ligue 1	28	1	3	0	0	0	7	0	38	1
Lyon	2008–09	Ligue 1	19	0	0	0	0	0	4	1	23	1
Lyon	2009–10	Ligue 1	30	0	2	0	2	0	13	0	45	0
Lyon	2010–11	Ligue 1	32	0	2	0	0	0	8	0	42	0
Lyon	2011–12	Ligue 1	33	0	5	0	2	0	9	0	49	0
Lyon	2012–13	Ligue 1	27	1	0	0	0	0	8	2	35	3
Lyon	Total		286	3	20	2	0	0	126	3	382	5
Napoli	2013–14	Serie A	13	0	3	0	–		4	0	21	0
Sunderland	2014–15	Premier League	16	0	1	0	0	0	–		17	0
Career total			286	0	20	0	0	0	126	3	473	6

=== International ===
Score and result list France's goal tally first, score column indicates score after Réveillère goal.

List of international goals scored by Anthony Réveillère
No.	Date	Venue	Opponent	Score	Result	Competition
1	7 October 2011	Stade de France, Saint-Denis, France	Albania	3–0	3–0	Euro 2012 qualifying

== Honours ==
Lyon

- Ligue 1: 2003–04, 2004–05, 2005–06, 2006–07, 2007–08
- Coupe de France: 2007–08, 2011–12
- Trophée des Champions: 2003, 2004, 2005, 2006, 2007, 2012
- Coupe de la Ligue runner-up: 2011–12

Napoli

- Coppa Italia: 2013–14

Individual

- Ligue 1 Team of the Year: 2010–11
