= Mathieu Bodmer =

French footballer (born 1982)

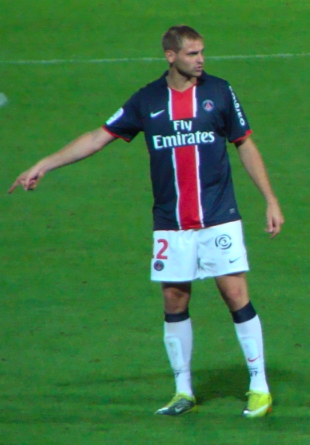
- Bodmer with Paris Saint-Germain in 2010

Personal information
- Full name: Mathieu Alain Daniel Bodmer
- Date of birth: 22 November 1982 (age 43)
- Place of birth: Évreux, Eure, France
- Height: 1.90 m (6 ft 3 in)
- Position: Midfielder

Team information
- Current team: Le Havre (sporting director)

Youth career
- 1997–1998: Évreux FC
- 1998–2000: Caen

Senior career*
Years	Team	Apps	(Gls)
2000–2003	Caen	80	(4)
2003–2007	Lille	135	(18)
2007–2010	Lyon	68	(7)
2010–2013	Paris Saint-Germain	63	(6)
2013	→ Saint-Étienne (loan)	14	(2)
2013–2017	Nice	80	(5)
2017	Guingamp	10	(0)
2017–2020	Amiens	48	(3)
Total		498	(45)

International career
2002	France U21	1	(0)
2008	France B	1	(0)
- * Club domestic league appearances and goals

Mathieu Alain Daniel Bodmer (born 22 November 1982) is a French former professional footballer who played as a midfielder. A former French youth international, he is known for his technique, playmaking skills and striking ability.

== Club career ==
=== Early career ===
Bodmer began his professional career at Évreux AC (now Évreux FC) at the age of 14. In 1998, he moved to Stade Malherbe Caen, a club in the second division of French football, where he made his debut in 2000. He played in 24 matches that season and by the end of the 2002–03 season, he had played in 79 matches for the club, scoring a total of four goals. His hard-working performances helped Caen keep a mid-table position in the league. Following the season, he joined first division club Lille OSC for €1 million.

=== Lille ===
The 2003–04 season served as an auspicious introduction to top league football, where Bodmer played against the likes of Michael Essien. He earned 33 appearances for the first-team in his debut season, scoring two goals; however, in the 2004–05 season, Lille enjoyed an impressive second-place finish giving them a place in the UEFA Champions League. They were considered minnows in that competition, but Bodmer, as a holding midfielder, helped Lille achieve a draw against Manchester United at Old Trafford.

His impressive performances earned the interest of Arsène Wenger, manager of Arsenal, who had considered buying him in the spring of 2005, but he was rebuffed by Lille president Michel Seydoux. Periodically, he was linked with other big-name clubs, including Manchester United. He did sign a contract extension at Lille in December 2005, extending his stay at the club until 2011. Despite signing a new contract, Bodmar does admit that he had interests playing in The Premiership in the future. In the 2006–07 Champions League at the group stage, Bodmer provided two assists for Peter Odemwingie and Kader Keïta to score in a 2–0 win over the seven times UEFA Champion League winner A.C. Milan on 6 December 2006.

=== Lyon ===
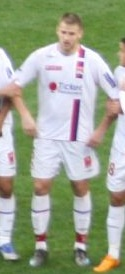
Bodmer during his time at Lyon.

On 14 June 2007, Lyon officially announced that they would be unveiling Kader Keïta and Bodmer to the media, the pair having already passed their medicals at the Stade Gerland. On 16 June 2007, Lyon confirmed the signing of Bodmer from Lille for a €6.5 million fee. Bodmer was given the number 5 shirt, previously worn by Caçapa. Bodmer made his Ligue 1 debut for Lyon in Lyon's second match day loss to Toulouse. He played the full 90 minutes. Bodmer scored his first goal on 29 August 2007 against Sochaux in Lyon's 2–1 win. It was the game-winning goal.

In February 2008, he scored two goals in one league game for the first time of his career against Sochaux, in a 4–2 victory. Exactly one month later, he shone against Lyon's direct competitor for the league title, Bordeaux, again netting two goals in another 4–2 win. The second of those goals was particularly spectacular. Chesting down an aerial pass, Bodmer chipped the ball over his opponent Souleymane Diawara and again controlled it on his chest before firing acrobatically past goalkeeper Ulrich Ramé. Former Marseille midfielder Franck Sauzée, commenting the game as a TV pundit for Canal+, praised Bodmer for his technique and elegance.

In his successful first season in Lyon, the former Lille midfielder was part of a team that conquered a Ligue 1-Coupe de France double for the first time in the club's history. Unfortunately, it would turn out to be Bodmer's best season with the club. In the summer of 2008, Claude Puel, his former coach in Lille, was appointed as the new club manager. Puel did not fancy deploying his former protégé in midfield and preferred playing him in defence, where he was less efficient. After leaving the club, Bodmer admitted that the relationship between Puel and him was a tense one, and had been so ever since their days in Lille.

To make matters worse, between 2008 and 2010, Bodmer was plagued by injuries, another factor that made him unable to reproduce the fine form he had displayed in his first season with Les Gônes. Thus, he made just 31 league appearances during the 2008–09 and 2009–10 seasons, less than the 37 he had managed in 2007–08. During those two seasons, Lyon failed to win any silverware. In the 2009–10 Champions League quarter final, Bodmer provided his first assist for Lyon in the Champions League to allow striker Lisandro López to score the first goal in the game against French side Bordeaux in the 3–1 win and also played in the second leg which they lost 1–0. Lyon managed to win 3–2 on aggregate to go through to the semi-final the first time after three previous quarter-final appearances in the Champions League. Unfortunately, Lyon didn't reach to the final after losing to Bayern Munich.

=== Paris Saint-Germain ===
On 30 June 2010, Paris Saint-Germain signed the French midfielder to a three-year deal from Ligue 1 rival Olympique Lyonnais for €2.5 million plus €1.5 million variables and becoming PSG first signing of the summer. Bodmer thus joined the club he had supported as a boy. Ironically, he would go on to score his first goal for his new colours against his former club, in a Coupe de la Ligue fixture.

Bodmer made his debut in a Paris Saint-Germain shirt as PSG won 2–1 against Saint-Étienne on 8 August 2010. Bodmer scored his first goal for PSG in a 3–1 victory over Brest on 5 December 2010. Bodmer enjoyed a solid first season in the French capital. He was often deployed by his new coach Antoine Kombouaré in his favourite position: attacking midfielder behind the striker(s). In this position, he managed to showcase his skills and scored 10 goals in 42 appearances, all competitions included. This tally included a beautiful individual effort against former club and champions elect Lille at the Parc des Princes in May 2011. For the first time since 2007–08, Bodmer managed to make more than 20 league appearances in one season, being called to action during 28 league games in all.

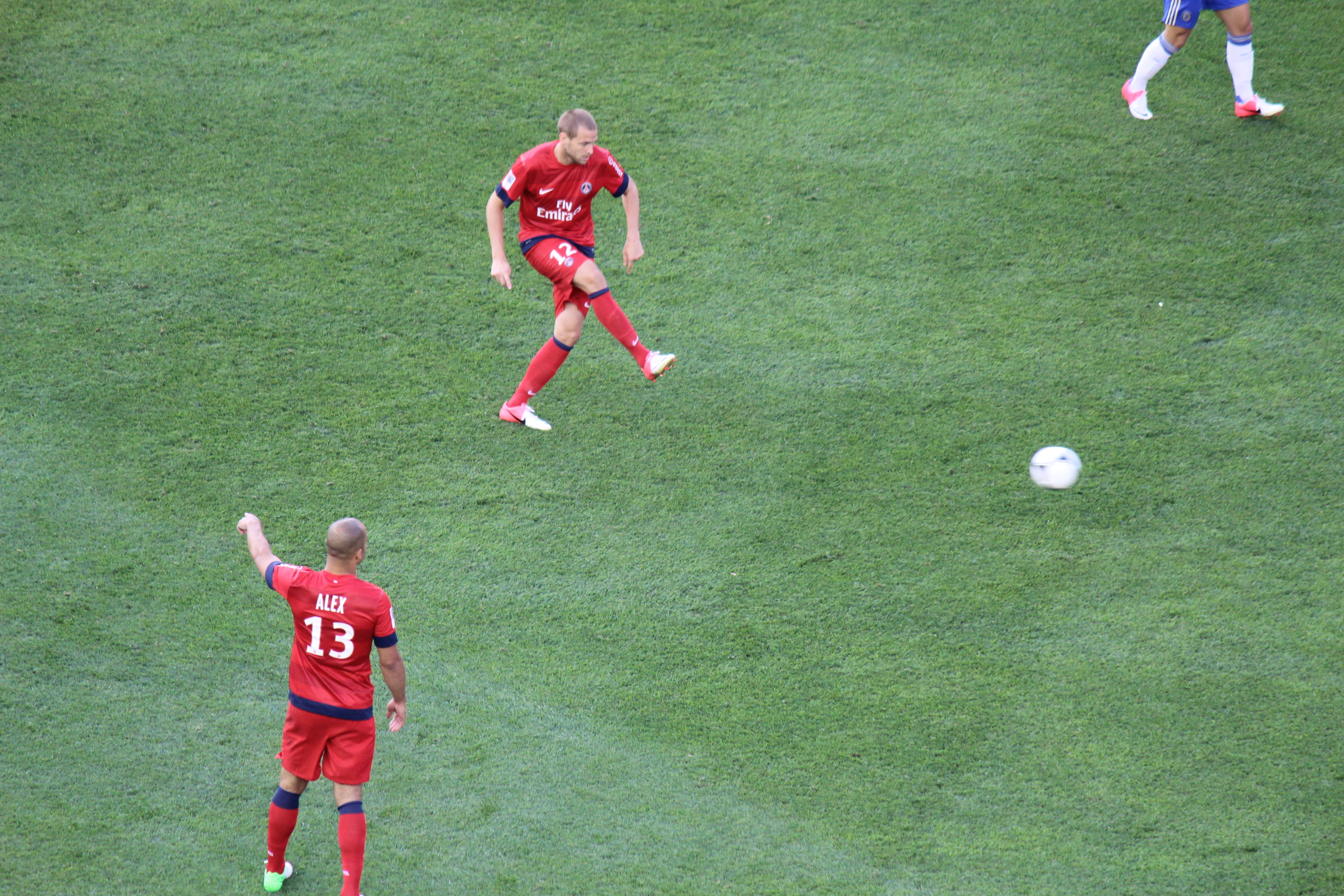
Bodmer (in 12) taking a kick.

In his second season, Paris Saint-Germain change it ownership with the arrival of Qatar Investment Authority and Leonardo Araújo. Bodmer scored the only goal in the game with a 1–0 win over Saint-Étienne on 21 December 2011, putting PSG in the top of the table. Bodmer still continued to player under coach Kombouaré despite new signing until on 30 December 2011 Kombouaré was sacked and was replaced by Carlo Ancelotti. Under Ancelotti, Bodmer was a regular starter and was appointed vice-captain (taking over from Ceará. Bodmer became captain in occasion while Mamadou Sakho was absent. In the Europa League, Bodmer scored two goals against Red Bull Salzburg and Athletic Bilbao respectively but Paris Saint-Germain were eliminated from the group stage. In 2012, Bodmer revealed he wants Paris Saint-Germain to offer him a new long-term deal or he will leave in the summer as his contract set to end in June 2013 and worried about what his future could be if he lets his contract run down. Later in the season, PSG was second place in table behind Montpellier.

=== Saint-Étienne (loan) ===
The following season, Bodmer featured less often at PSG behind midfielders Blaise Matuidi and Thiago Motta, and made fewer appearances for PSG. On the last day of the transfer window, Bodmer joined Saint-Étienne on loan for the rest of the season. Bodmer scored his first goal, on 9 February 2013, in a 4–1 win over Montpellier, and it was his first goal in two years.

=== Nice ===
On 11 September 2013, Paris Saint-Germain announced that Bodmer was allowed to leave the club, he subsequently joined fellow Ligue 1 side OGC Nice, he was given the number 24 shirt. Bodmer debuted on 15 September 2013, against Lille OSC, winning 2–0.

After club captain Didier Digard left for Real Betis on a free transfer at the end of the 2014–15 season, Mendy was named captain.

Bodmer was released by Nice on 9 January 2017. The club were unable to guarantee Bodmer the game time he wanted in the second half of the 2016–17 Ligue 1 season and this led to the pair agreeing to a mutual termination.

== International career ==
Bodmer was called up to the senior France team in March 2008 but was ultimately never capped at that level.

== Later career ==
Between 2009 and 2013, Bodmer served as president of amateur French club Évreux FC 27, located in his hometown. Due to his good commitment as a president of Évreux FC, Bodmer was awarded a Social engagement and citizen of the professional player.

After his retirement in 2020, Bodmer worked as a pundit for Amazon Prime Video and RMC. In June 2022, Bodmer was hired as sporting director for Ligue 2 club Le Havre AC.

== Personal life ==
Bodmer is the father of the professional footballer Mathéo Bodmer.

== Honours ==
Lille

- UEFA Intertoto Cup: 2004

Lyon

- Ligue 1: 2007–08
- Coupe de France: 2007–08
- Trophée des Champions: 2007

Saint-Étienne

- Coupe de la Ligue: 2012–13
