= François Clerc =

French footballer (born 1983)

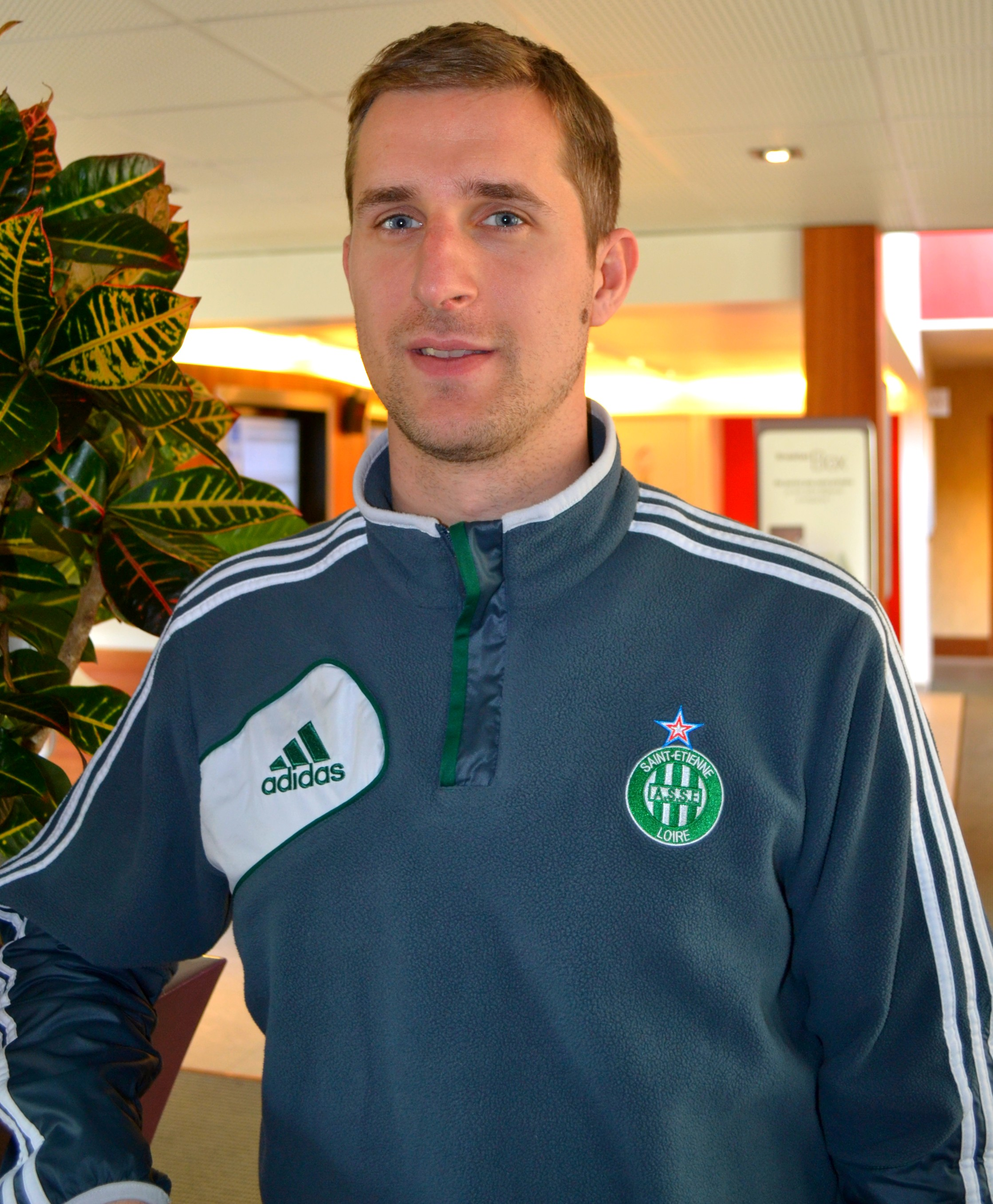
- Clerc with Saint-Étienne in 2013

Personal information
- Full name: François Jacques Clerc
- Date of birth: 18 April 1983 (age 43)
- Place of birth: Bourg-en-Bresse, Ain, France
- Height: 1.86 m (6 ft 1 in)
- Position: Right-back

Youth career
- 1992–1997: Bourg-Péronnas
- 1997–2001: Lyon

Senior career*
Years	Team	Apps	(Gls)
2001–2005	Lyon B	67	(7)
2004–2005	→ Toulouse (loan)	7	(0)
2005–2010	Lyon	78	(1)
2010–2012	Nice	61	(5)
2012–2016	Saint-Étienne	85	(3)
2016–2018	Gazélec Ajaccio	25	(2)
Total		323	(18)

International career
2005–2006	France U21	3	(0)
2006–2008	France	13	(0)
- * Club domestic league appearances and goals

François Jacques Clerc (born 18 April 1983) is a French former professional footballer who played as a right-back.

== Club career ==
Born in Bourg-en-Bresse, Ain, Clerc joined Lyon at the age of 14. After spending his first years as a senior with the reserves, he was loaned to Toulouse with which he first appeared in Ligue 1, making his debut in the competition on 14 August 2004 in a 4–1 away win against Stasbourg.

Returned to L'OL for the 2005–06 season, Clerc went on to become and important first-team member as the club won three national championships in a row, contributing with 62 league appearances combined in that timeframe. He battled with Anthony Réveillère for first-choice status during his tenure, appeared in 20 UEFA Champions League games but was also banned for four matches and fined €150,000 by the French Professional Football League, after he incurred in an illegal transfer agreement to Marseille in 2006.

In the fall of 2010, free agent Clerc joined Nice also in the top division after convincing manager Eric Roy his knee injury problems were a thing of the past. He scored a career-best four goals in his second year with the Côte d'Azur side, but they could only rank 13th.

On 9 July 2012, Clerc signed a three-year contract with Saint-Étienne. He scored his first and only goal of the campaign on 17 March 2013, helping the hosts come from behind for a 2–2 draw against Paris-Saint Germain.

After two seasons with Gazélec Ajaccio in Ligue 2, the 35-year-old Clerc announced his retirement.

== International career ==
Clerc earned his first cap for France on 11 October 2006, in a 5–0 win over Faroe Islands for the UEFA Euro 2008 qualifiers. He was selected by coach Raymond Domenech for the finals in Austria and Switzerland, replacing longtime incumbent Willy Sagnol for the last and decisive group stage clash against Italy, which ended in a 2–0 loss and exit.

== Honours ==
Lyon

- Ligue 1: 2005–06, 2006–07, 2007–08
- Coupe de France: 2007–08
- Trophée des Champions: 2006, 2007
- Coupe de la Ligue runner-up: 2006–07

Saint-Étienne

- Coupe de la Ligue: 2012–13
