= Yannis Tafer =

French professional footballer (born 1991)

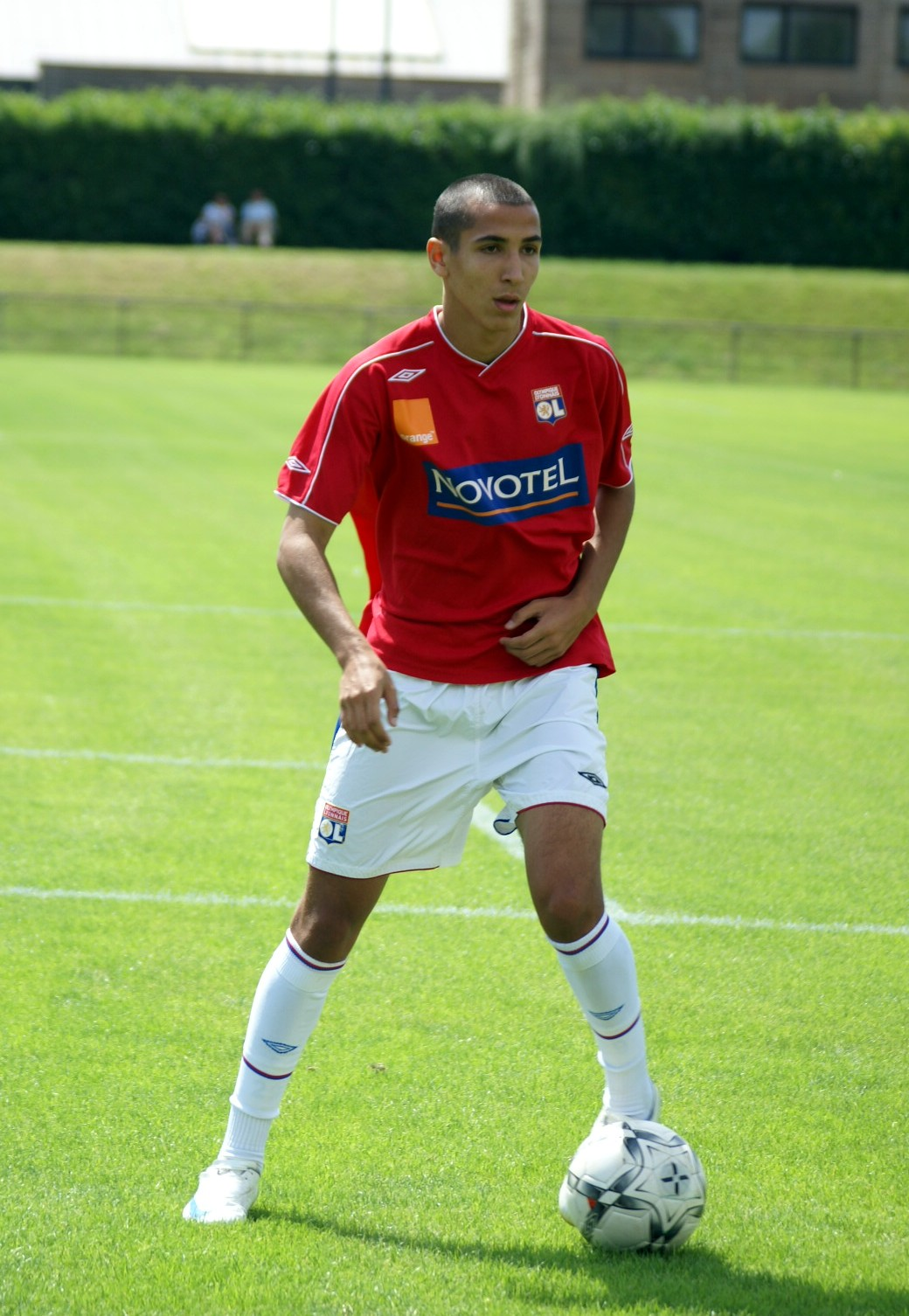
- Yannis Tafer

Personal information
- Date of birth: 11 February 1991 (age 35)
- Place of birth: Grenoble, France
- Height: 1.81 m (5 ft 11 in)
- Position: Winger

Team information
- Current team: Racing-Union
- Number: 10

Youth career
- 1997–2004: Échirolles
- 2004–2008: Lyon

Senior career*
Years	Team	Apps	(Gls)
2008–2012	Lyon	10	(1)
2010–2011	→ Toulouse (loan)	16	(0)
2012–2014	Lausanne-Sport	56	(9)
2014–2019	St. Gallen	124	(22)
2019	ES Sahel	1	(0)
2020	Neuchâtel Xamax	8	(0)
2021–	Racing-Union	11	(0)

International career^{‡}
2007–2008	France U17	19	(11)
2008–2009	France U18	8	(7)
2009–2010	France U19	14	(6)
2010–2011	France U20	11	(3)
Medal record
Men's football
Representing France
UEFA European Under-17 Championship
Runner-up	2008 Turkey
- * Club domestic league appearances and goals as of 25 November 2015 ‡ National team caps and goals as of 14 August 2021

Yannis Tafer (French pronunciation: [janis tafɛːʁ], born 11 February 1991) is a French professional footballer who plays as a winger for Luxembourger club Racing-Union.

He is a France youth international having represented the country under-17, under-18, and under-19 level. Tafer was the top scorer at the 2008 UEFA European Under-17 Football Championship leading the tournament with four goals and played on the under-19 team that won the 2010 UEFA European Under-19 Football Championship.

== Club career ==
=== Early career ===
Tafer was born in the city of Grenoble in the Rhône-Alpes region to an Algerian father, who emigrated to France from Constantine, and a Portuguese mother. He began his football career with a local club in the region, FC Échirolles. After spending seven years with his childhood club, Tafer signed an aspirant (youth) contract with the then three-time champions Olympique Lyonnais.

=== Lyon ===
Following the 2007–08 season, Tafer signed his first professional contract with Lyon agreeing to a three-year contract until 2011. For the 2008–09 season, he was placed on Lyon's first-team squad and was assigned the 34 shirt, though he was reassigned to the number 29. Tafer was a key participant in the club's preseason tour playing in four of the five matches contested. He scored three goals in the preseason netting one each against second division club Nîmes, Romanian club Rapid București, and fellow Ligue 1 club Nancy.

Despite being on the first-team, Tafer was limited to playing mostly on the club's Championnat de France amateur team appearing in 15 matches scoring five goals, which included a brace against RCO Agde and goals against rivals Saint-Étienne and AS Lyon Duchère. On 24 January 2009, Tafer made his professional debut in the club's Coupe de France match against Concarneau coming on as a substitute in the 75th minute. In the match, he was instrumental in the club's 5th goal after taking a pass and shooting the ball, which went off the post. Teammate Kader Keïta quickly pounced on the rebound and converted the goal. Lyon won the match 6–0. Two weeks later, Tafer made his league debut making a one-minute cameo appearance in a 3–1 victory over Nice. Tafer made two more league appearances being relegated back to the amateur team.

For the 2009–10 season, Tafer's playing time was slightly increased. On 26 September 2009 in his season debut, he scored his first professional goal against Toulouse after appearing in the match as a halftime substitute. The goal drew the match at 1–1 and Lyon won the match after a late second-half goal from Bafétimbi Gomis. Two months later, he assisted on César Delgado's goal in a 2–0 victory over Boulogne. On 13 January 2010, Tafer made his first career start in a 3–0 win over Metz in the Coupe de la Ligue playing the entire match.

=== Toulouse ===
On 24 August 2010, Lyon confirmed that the club had loaned out Tafer to fellow Ligue 1 club Toulouse. The loan was for the entire 2010–11 season and had a buyout option for €4 million. His signing was cited as a replacement for the departed André-Pierre Gignac, who joined Marseille. Tafer was presented to the media by the club on 25 August and was given the number 10 shirt, formerly worn by Gignac.

=== Lausanne-Sport ===
On 25 July 2012, following his release from Lyon, Tafer signed a three years contract with Swiss club Lausanne-Sport.

=== St. Gallen ===
On 5 June 2014, Tafer moved to FC St. Gallen signing a three-year contract until 2017.

=== ES Sahel ===
On 12 July 2019, it was confirmed, that Tafer had joined Tunisian club Étoile Sportive du Sahel.

=== Neuchâtel Xamax ===
Xamax confirmed on 4 January 2020, that Tafer had signed a deal until the end of the season with the club, with an option for one further year.

=== Racing-Union ===
On 2 February 2021, he signed with Racing-Union in Luxembourg.

== International career ==
Tafer is a France youth international having played under-17, under-18, and under-19 level. He made his youth international debut with the under-17 team on 2 October 2007 against Switzerland. Tafer scored a brace in the team's 4–0 victory. On 4 December 2007, Tafer scored both goals in the team's 2–1 win over Turkey. At the Algarve Cup in Portugal, he helped the team to a 2nd-place finish by scoring his fifth goal of the campaign in the team's 4–2 win against Denmark. In the Elite Round portion of qualification for the 2008 UEFA European Under-17 Football Championship, Tafer scored a double against Israel in the team's second group stage match. France finished the round unbeaten, which led to qualification to the UEFA-sanctioned tournament. At the tournament, Tafer led all players with four goals scored. He scored all of his goals in the group stage netting one against the Republic of Ireland, another one against Spain, and two goals against Switzerland. France later reached the final where they were defeated 4–0 by Spain. Tafer finished the campaign with the under-17s appearing in 19 matches and scoring a team-high 11 goals.

With the under-18 team, Tafer scored a team-leading seven goals in only eight matches. On 25 March 2009, he scored a hat trick against Germany in a 4–3 victory. On 13 June, Tafer converted another hat trick, this time against England in a 4–2 victory. The match was played at Wembley Stadium in front of 15,000 spectators and the victory resulted in the team being presented the Fallenhero Trophy by The Football Association chairman Trevor Brooking. For under-19 duty, Tafer was again called upon by coach Francis Smerecki making his first appearance with the team at the 2009 edition of the Sendaï Cup. Beginning with the team's 2–1 victory over Belgium, Tafer scored a goal in four straight matches. On 7 June 2010, he was named to Smerecki's 18-man squad to participate in the 2010 UEFA European Under-19 Football Championship. In the tournament, he scored the opening goal in the team's 1–1 draw with England. The draw assured the club a place in the semi-final portion of the competition where France defeated Croatia 2–1. In the final, Tafer appeared as a halftime substitute and assisted on the team's opening goal scored by Gilles Sunu. France had been trailing 1–0 prior to the equalizer. France won the match 2–1 following a late goal from Tafer's domestic teammate Alexandre Lacazette. The title is the country's second UEFA Under-19 championship.

Due to France's victory at the UEFA Under-19 championship, the nation qualified for the 2011 FIFA U-20 World Cup, which merited under-20 team appearances for Tafer. After missing the team's opening match of the season against Portugal, he made his under-20 debut in the team's 1–0 win over Montenegro. On 17 May 2011, Tafer scored his first goal for the team in its 3–3 draw with the United States netting France's opening goal. In the return match two days later, he scored the game-winning goal in a 2–1 win. Tafer later participated in the 2011 Toulon Tournament with the under-20 team and scored a goal in a 4–1 group stage win over Mexico. On 10 June, Tafer was named to the 21-man squad to participate in the U-20 World Cup. He made his debut in the competition on 30 July 2011 in the team's 4–1 defeat to the hosts Colombia appearing as a substitute. Tafer is also eligible to represent Algeria and Portugal at international level.

== Personal life ==
Yannis is the cousin of Aziz Tafer, who is a former professional footballer. Yannis cites his idols as former teammate and mentor Karim Benzema and former Brazilian international Ronaldo.

== Career statistics ==
As of 1 July 2019

Club	Season	League			Cup		League Cup		Europe		Other		Total	
Club	Season	Division	Apps	Goals	Apps	Goals	Apps	Goals	Apps	Goals	Apps	Goals	Apps	Goals
Lyon	2008–09	Ligue 1	3	0	1	0	0	0	0	0	—		4	0
Lyon	2009–10	Ligue 1	7	1	2	0	2	0	0	0	—		11	1
Lyon	2011–12	Ligue 1	0	0	0	0	0	0	0	0	—		0	0
Lyon	Total		10	1	3	0	2	0	0	0	0	0	15	1
Toulouse (loan)	2010–11	Ligue 1	16	0	0	0	1	0	0	0	—		17	0
Lausanne	2012–13	Swiss Super League	23	1	4	4	—		—		—		27	5
Lausanne	2013–14	Swiss Super League	33	8	4	1	—		—		—		37	9
Lausanne	Total		56	9	8	5	0	0	0	0	0	0	64	14
St. Gallen	2014–15	Swiss Super League	29	8	4	2	—		—		—		33	10
St. Gallen	2015–16	Swiss Super League	16	5	2	2	—		—		—		18	7
St. Gallen	2016–17	Swiss Super League	35	8	2	0	—		—		—		37	8
St. Gallen	2017–18	Swiss Super League	20	1	2	0	—		—		—		22	1
St. Gallen	2018–19	Swiss Super League	24	0	0	0	—		2	0	—		26	0
St. Gallen	Total		124	22	10	4	0	0	2	0	0	0	136	26
Career total			206	32	21	9	3	0	2	0	0	0	232	41

== Honours ==
=== Club ===
Lyon

- Coupe de France: 2011–12

=== International ===
France U19

- UEFA European Under-19 Football Championship: 2010

France U20

- FIFA U-20 World Cup fourth place: 2011

=== Individual ===
- UEFA European Under-17 Football Championship Top Scorer: 2008
