= Joan Hartock =

Martiniquais footballer (born 1987)

Personal information
- Date of birth: 17 February 1987 (age 39)
- Place of birth: La Trinité, Martinique
- Height: 1.90 m (6 ft 3 in)
- Position: Goalkeeper

Youth career
- 2003–2004: US Robert
- 2004–2005: Lyon

Senior career*
Years	Team	Apps	(Gls)
2005–2011	Lyon	0	(0)
2011–2017	Brest	77	(0)
2017–2018	Quevilly-Rouen	32	(0)

International career
2004	Martinique	8	(0)
- * Club domestic league appearances and goals as of 11 May 2018 (UTC)

Joan Hartock (born 17 February 1987) is a Martiniquais footballer who most recently played as a goalkeeper for Quevilly-Rouen. He previously played for Brest and Lyon.

== Club career ==
=== Early years ===
Hartock began his football career with Martinique club US Robert. He moved to French giants Lyon in 2004, still only 17 years old. He played mainly for Lyon's B team in the CFA, and was the first team's third keeper for a number of years. He was released in 2011, having never made an official first team appearance for Lyon in his seven-year spell at the club.

In his spell of free agency, Hartock had trials with Aston Villa, Nantes, Neuchâtel Xamax and Nice.

=== Brest ===
On 11 August 2011, Hartock signed a one-year contract with Brest. He made his début for Brest in a Coupe de France match against Niort on 7 January 2012, his first competitive first-team appearance for any side in French football. At the end of the 2011–12 season, Hartock signed a two-year contract extension with Brest. He made a further three Coupe de France appearances in the 2012–13 season, along with his début Ligue 1 match, a 2–1 defeat to Lille on 31 March 2013.

Hartock was the first-choice keeper for Brest in the 2015–16 and 2016–17 Ligue 2 seasons, playing in 36 games in each season. However he was replaced by manager Jean-Marc Furlan in May 2017 after two poor home performances. At the end of the 2016–17 season he was released from the final year of his contract.

=== Quevilly-Rouen ===
Immediately after leaving Brest, Hartock signed with newly promoted Ligue 2 side US Quevilly-Rouen. He made 32 appearances, but the club were relegated at the end of the first season, and Hartock left due to budget constraints.

== Career statistics ==
Appearances and goals by club, season, and competition
Club	Season	League			National cup		League cup		Europe		Other		Total	
Club	Season	Division	Apps	Goals	Apps	Goals	Apps	Goals	Apps	Goals	Apps	Goals	Apps	Goals
Lyon	2005–06	Ligue 1	0	0	0	0	0	0	0	0	0	0	0	0
Lyon	2006–07	Ligue 1	0	0	0	0	0	0	0	0	0	0	0	0
Lyon	2007–08	Ligue 1	0	0	0	0	0	0	0	0	0	0	0	0
Lyon	2008–09	Ligue 1	0	0	0	0	0	0	0	0	0	0	0	0
Lyon	2009–10	Ligue 1	0	0	0	0	0	0	0	0	—		0	0
Lyon	Total		0	0	0	0	0	0	0	0	0	0	0	0
Brest	2011–12	Ligue 1	0	0	1	0	0	0	—		—		1	0
Brest	2012–13	Ligue 1	2	0	3	0	0	0	—		—		5	0
Brest	2013–14	Ligue 2	0	0	3	0	1	0	—		—		4	0
Brest	2014–15	Ligue 2	3	0	6	0	0	0	—		—		9	0
Brest	2015–16	Ligue 2	36	0	0	0	1	0	—		—		37	0
Brest	2016–17	Ligue 2	36	0	1	0	0	0	—		—		37	0
Brest	Total		77	0	14	0	2	0	—		—		93	0
Quevilly-Rouen	2017–18	Ligue 2	32	0	0	0	0	0	—		—		32	0
Career total			109	0	14	0	2	0	0	0	0	0	125	0
