= Hakim El Bounadi =

French footballer (born 1986)

Personal information
- Date of birth: 9 August 1986 (age 40)
- Place of birth: Belfort, France
- Height: 1.82 m (6 ft 0 in)
- Position: Midfielder

Youth career
- –2006: Sochaux

Senior career*
Years	Team	Apps	(Gls)
2006–2009	Sochaux	4	(0)
2007–2008	→ Clermont (loan)	4	(0)
2010–2013	ASM Belfort	67	(5)
2013–2014	White Star Bruxelles	7	(0)
2014–2017	Saint-Louis Neuweg	60	(1)
2017–2018	Mulhouse	19	(2)
2018–2019	AS Timau Basel		
2019–?	AS Huningue		
- * Club domestic league appearances and goals

Hakim El Bounadi (born 9 August 1986) is a French former professional footballer who played as a midfielder.

== Career ==
In the summer of 2018, El Bounadi joined Swiss club AS Timau Basel. One year later, he returned to France and joined AS Huningue.

By December 2022 El Bounadi had retired from playing, having finished his career in Alsace.
