= Saïd Mehamha =

Algerian footballer (born 1990)

Personal information
- Date of birth: September 4, 1990 (age 36)
- Place of birth: Lyon, France
- Height: 1.65 m (5 ft 5 in)
- Position: Central midfielder

Youth career
- 1997–2008: Lyon

Senior career*
Years	Team	Apps	(Gls)
2008–2012	Lyon	0	(0)
2012–2013	JSM Béjaïa	8	(0)
2013–2014	Torre Levante	?	(?)
2014–2016	AS Lyon-Duchère	16	(0)

International career
2006–2007	France U17	11	(1)
2008–2009	France U19	8	(0)
2010	Algeria U23	1	(0)
- * Club domestic league appearances and goals

Saïd Mehamha (born September 4, 1990) is an Algerian former professional footballer who played as a central midfielder.

== Club career ==
Hatai Mehamha began his career at Lyon, joining the youth team in 1997 as a six-year-old. In 2008, he signed his first professional with the club, signing a three-year contract. In July 2011, despite having never featured for the first team, the club extended his contract for one more season.

In the summer of 2012, after an unsuccessful trial with Ligue 2 club Lens, Mehamha signed with Algerian club JSM Béjaïa.

== International career ==
Mehamha was a member of the France U17 national team at the 2007 UEFA European Under-17 Football Championship in Belgium. Later that year, he captained the Under-17's at the 2007 FIFA U-17 World Cup in South Korea.

In 2010, Mehamha changed his international allegiance from France to Algeria and was subsequently called up to the Algeria U23 for a friendly match against Qatar.
