= Fábio Santos (footballer, born 1980) =

Brazilian footballer

Personal information
- Full name: Fábio dos Santos Barbosa
- Date of birth: 9 October 1980 (age 46)
- Place of birth: Campina Grande, Brazil
- Height: 1.82 m (6 ft 0 in)
- Position: Defensive midfielder

Senior career*
Years	Team	Apps	(Gls)
1999–2000	Santo André	6	(0)
2001	Rio Branco (SP)		
2001	Náutico		
2002–2004	São Caetano	57	(0)
2004	Nacional da Madeira	6	(0)
2005–2006	Cruzeiro	33	(0)
2007–2009	Lyon	22	(1)
2008	→ São Paulo (loan)	3	(0)
2009	Fluminense	1	(0)
2010	Cruzeiro	1	(0)
- * Club domestic league appearances and goals

Fábio dos Santos Barbosa (born 9 October 1980) is a Brazilian former professional footballer who played as a defensive midfielder.

== Career ==
Born in Campina Grande, Paraíba, Fábio Santos started his career at Sao Paulo state.

Fábio Santos was signed by Lyon in January 2007 from Cruzeiro.

He was loaned to São Paulo in January 2008 until July 2008. After being released by Lyon, he signed a 2 1/2-year contract with Fluminense in May 2009, rejoining Fred. On 26 April 2010 Cruzeiro signed the midfielder, the player coming from Fluminense and signed until 31 December 2010.

After the match against São Paulo on 13 May 2010, Fábio Santos told the press that the match was his last as a player due to successive pains to his knee, which suffered four surgeries during his career, and he claimed he wasn't fully recovered from his last injury.

== Career statistics ==
Appearances and goals by club, season and competition
Club	Season	League			National cup (Note: Includes Copa do Brasil, Taça de Portugal, Coupe de France.)		League cup (Note: Includes Taça da Liga, Coupe de la Ligue.)		Continental		Total	
Club	Season	Division	Apps	Goals	Apps	Goals	Apps	Goals	Apps	Goals	Apps	Goals
Santo André	1999	Paulista Série A2			–		–		–			
Santo André	2000	Copa João Havelange			–		–		–			
Santo André	Total				0	0	0	0	0	0		
Rio Branco (SP)	2001	Série C			–		–		–			
Náutico	2001	Série B					–		–			
São Caetano	2002	Série A			–		–		0	0		
São Caetano	2003	Série A					–		1	0		
São Caetano	2004	Série A			–		–		8	0		
São Caetano	Total						0	0	9	0		
Nacional	2004–05	Primeira Liga	6	0			–		2	0		
Cruzeiro	2005	Série A					–		1	0		
Cruzeiro	2006	Série A					–		1	0		
Cruzeiro	Total						0	0	2	0		
Lyon	2006–07	Ligue 1	8	0	0	0	0	0	0	0	8	0
Lyon	2007–08	Ligue 1	8	1	0	0	1	0	3	1	12	2
Lyon	2008–09	Ligue 1	6	0	2	0	1	0	0	0	9	0
Lyon	Total		22	1	2	0	2	0	3	1	29	2
São Paulo (loan)	2008	Série A	3	0	–		–		7	0		
Fluminense	2009	Série A	0	0	–		–		0	0	0	0
Career total							2	0	23	1		

== Honours ==
- Campeonato Paulista: 2004
- Campeonato Mineiro: 2006
- Ligue 1: 2007, 2008
- Trophée des Champions: 2007
