= Sandy Paillot =

French footballer (born 1987)

Personal information
- Date of birth: 27 February 1987 (age 39)
- Place of birth: Lyon, France
- Height: 1.90 m (6 ft 3 in)
- Position: Centre-back

Youth career
- 2005–2007: Lyon

Senior career*
Years	Team	Apps	(Gls)
2007–2009	Lyon	2	(0)
2007–2008	→ Grenoble (loan)	11	(0)
2008–2009	→ Grenoble (loan)	22	(4)
2009–2011	Grenoble	32	(0)
2011–2013	Épinal	30	(2)
2013–2014	Paris FC	14	(0)
2014–2015	Limoges FC	15	(2)
2015–2018	Cholet	66	(5)
2019–2022	Fleury		

International career
2008–	France U21	1	(0)
- * Club domestic league appearances and goals

Sandy Paillot (born 27 February 1987) is a French former professional footballer who played as a centre-back.

== Club career ==
Paillot was promoted to the Lyon first team for the 2007–08 Ligue 1 season. He was given the squad number 32, but later changed to 15. He made his club debut in Lyon's preseason tour of South Korea, as the club took part in the Peace Cup, and appeared in all four matches.

In the season, Paillot appeared in Lyon's 4–0 victory over Ligue 2 side Créteil in the Coupe de France, on 6 January 2008, as a substitute. He made his first team debut on 23 January, in Lyon's 2–0 win over Lorient, again subbing in. On 31 January, Paillot joined Ligue 2 outfit Grenoble, on loan for the remainder of the season. After returning to Lyon, it was announced that Grenoble were looking to secure Paillot on another loan deal. After weeks of speculation, it was finally announced that Paillot would return to Grenoble on loan, this time for the entire 2008–09 season. In 2009 he joined the club on a four-year contract.

When Grenoble were liquidated in the summer of 2011, Paillot was without a club until signing a short-term contract for SAS Épinal in December. After a good half-season, he left Épinal, but his search for another club was hampered by an injury whilst on trial with FC Metz. Eventually he re-signed with Épinal for another half-season in December 2012.

In the summer of 2013 Paillot signed a contract with Rouen, but the club filed for bankruptcy before the season started, and in August Paillot signed a one-year contract with newly promoted Championnat National side Paris FC. Not retained by Paris FC, Paillot was without a club until signing for Championnat de France Amateur side Limoges FC in October 2014.

In June 2015 Paillot joined SO Cholet.

In January 2019, he moved to Fleury.

== International career ==
Paillot was a unanimous selection to the French U-20 squad that participated in the 2007 Toulon Youth Festival. He remained eligible to participate in 2009 UEFA U-21 Championships, however he has yet to receive a call-up during the qualification phase. He did, however, receive his first cap and call-up to the France U-21 squad participating in a friendly against the Czech Republic.

== Honours ==
=== Club ===
- 2007 Peace Cup winner
- Trophée des Champions: 2007

=== International ===
- 2007 Toulon Tournament winner
