= Romain Beynié =

French footballer (born 1987)

Personal information
- Date of birth: 6 May 1987 (age 39)
- Place of birth: Lyon, France
- Height: 1.75 m (5 ft 9 in)
- Position: Midfielder

Team information
- Current team: Gueugnon

Youth career
- 1993–2002: FC L'Arbresle
- 2002–2006: Lyon

Senior career*
Years	Team	Apps	(Gls)
2007–2010	Lyon	0	(0)
2008–2009	→ A.F.C. Tubize (loan)	24	(0)
2010	Gueugnon		
2010–2011	Mulhouse		
19–19	Luzenac AP		
2012–2015	Amiens		
2015–2016	SR Colmar		
2016–2017	CA Bastia		
2017–2020	FC Bavois		

International career
- France U19
- * Club domestic league appearances and goals

Romain Beynié (born 6 May 1987) is a French former professional footballer who played as a midfielder.

== Career ==
Beynié began his football career with FC L'Arbresle, before moving to his hometown club Lyon in 2002. He made his professional debut in a 2005–06 UEFA Champions League match against Norwegian side Rosenborg in 2005, appearing as a 90th-minute substitute.

Beynié was promoted to the senior squad for the 2007–08 season. He was given the squad number 24. He did not make an appearance in Ligue 1 competition that season. The following season, with Lyon promoted several other promising youth players to the senior squad, Beynié was loaned out to Belgian club and recently promoted A.F.C. Tubize in order to gain some much needed playing time. Though Tubize suffered relegation for the 2008–09 Jupiler League season, Beynié performed well, appearing in 23 of the 34 league matches, starting them all.

== Honours ==
- Trophée des Champions: 2006
