= 2007–08 Coupe de France =

Tournament details
- Country: France
- Teams: 6,734

Final positions
- Champions: Lyon
- Runners-up: Paris Saint-Germain

Tournament statistics
- Top goal scorer(s): Karim Benzema (6 goals)

The 2007–08 Coupe de France was the 91st edition of the prestigious tournament and is open to all clubs in French football, as well as the 4 overseas departments if they qualify. The defending champions were FC Sochaux-Montbéliard who defeated Olympique Marseille 5-4 on penalties to claim their 2nd Coupe de France trophy. The final was held on May 24, 2008 at the Stade de France. The 2008 Coupe de France champions are Olympique Lyonnais, who defeated Paris Saint-Germain 1-0 to claim their 4th Coupe de France trophy.

Note: Cup results officially began at the start of the 7th Round, as it is the official starting position of most professional clubs.

== Seventh Round ==
The matches played on 24 and 25 November 2007.

Team 1	Score	Team 2
Camon	2–4	Le Havre
Boulogne	1–0	Le Touquet
Châteaubriant	0–0 (a.e.t.) (1–3 p)	Brest
Chamalières	0–5	Clermont
Dijon	1–0 (a.e.t.)	Jura Sud
Grenoble	1–0	Bourg-Péronnas
Angers	1–0	Orléans
Thouars	1–1 (a.e.t.) (5–6 p)	Châteauroux
Avallon	0–5	Gueugnon
Guingamp	1–0	Vitré
Libourne-Saint-Seurin	2–1	Aurillac
Angoulême	0–1	Montpellier
Périgny	0–7	Niort
Vertou	0–2	Nantes
ASPV Strasbourg	1–3	Reims
Raismes	0–7	Amiens
Thiers	1–2	Bastia
Douai	1–2	Sedan
Sète	0–1	Ajaccio
Forbach	0–1	Troyes

== Eighth Round ==
The matches were played between 14 and 16 December 2007.

Team 1	Score	Team 2
Niort	1–0	Châteauroux
Mons-en-Barœul	2–3	Sedan
Drancy	0–1	Guingamp
Marignane	0–0 (a.e.t.) (3–1 p)	Ajaccio
Colomiers	0–1	Bastia
Troyes	3–1	Jarville
Dieppe	0–0 (a.e.t.) (4–5 p)	Boulogne
Grenoble	1–1 (a.e.t.) (3–4 p)	Montpellier
Saran	0–3	Nantes
Romorantin	1–0	Libourne-Saint-Seurin
Pontivy	1–2	Le Havre
Quimpér	1–2	Brest
Amiens	0–0 (a.e.t.) (3–1 p)	Mantes
Magny	0–2	Gueugnon
Le Moule (Gua.)	0–6	Angers
Reims	4–1	Calais
Dijon	2–1	Clermont

== Round of 64 ==
The matches were played between 4 and 6 January 2008.

Team 1	Score	Team 2
Lens	0–1	Niort
Selongey	2–3 (a.e.t.)	Le Mans
Viry-Châtillon	2–5	Bastia
Avranches	0–2	Dijon
Montpellier	1–0	Troyes
Vesoul	1–6	Metz
Beauvais	0–2	Marseille
Montluçon	0–3	Nantes
Carquefou	1–0	Gueugnon
Romorantin	1–2	Boulogne
Angers	2–0	Vannes
Amiens	2–1	Guingamp
Sedan	3–2	Caen
Nice	2–1 (a.e.t.)	Le Havre
Épinal	0–2	Paris Saint-Germain
Nancy	2–1	Reims
Auxerre	3–2 (a.e.t.)	Saint-Étienne
Lorient	2–1	Valenciennes
Quevilly	1–3	Bordeaux
Rouen	0–0 (a.e.t.) (4–5 p)	Strasbourg
Maubeuge	0–2	Sochaux
Toulouse	1–2	Paris FC
Martigues	0–3	Rennes
Avion	0–3	Lille
Créteil	0–4	Lyon
Brest	1–3 (a.e.t.)	Monaco

== Round of 32 ==
The matches were played between 1 and 3 February 2008.

Team 1	Score	Team 2
Boulogne	1–2 (a.e.t.)	Tours
Strasbourg	0–3	Metz
Arles	0–0 (a.e.t.) (9–8 p)	Niort
Lyon-La Duchère	0–1	Lille
Sedan	0–0 (a.e.t.) (4–2 p)	Nantes
Sochaux	1–1 (a.e.t.) (4–3 p)	Montpellier
Poiré-sur-Vie	1–3	Paris Saint-Germain
Paris FC	0–0 (a.e.t.) (5–6 p)	Dijon
Amiens	1–0	Gazélec Ajaccio
Angers	3–1	Nice
Bastia	3–0	Auxerre
Lorient	0–0 (a.e.t.) (3–1 p)	Rennes
Bordeaux	1–0	Le Mans
Carquefou	2–1 (a.e.t.)	Nancy
Croix de Savoie	0–1	Lyon
Marseille	3–1	Monaco

== Round of 16 ==
The matches were played on 18 and 19 March 2008.

Team 1	Score	Team 2
Paris Saint-Germain (1)	2–1	Bastia (2)
Dijon (2)	3–1	Tours (3)
Sedan (2)	2–0	Angers (2)
Lyon (1)	2–1	Sochaux (1)
Bordeaux (1)	2–0 (a.e.t.)	Lille (1)
Lorient (1)	0–1	Metz (1)
Amiens (2)	1–1 (a.e.t.) (4–2 p)	Arles (3)
Carquefou (5)	1–0	Marseille (1)

== Quarter-finals ==
15 April 2008	Amiens (2)	1–0	Dijon (2)	Amiens
18:00	Contout 88'	Report		Stadium: Stade de la Licorne; Attendance: 11,479; Referee: Damien Ledentu

15 April 2008	Lyon (1)	1–0	Metz (1)	Lyon
20:45	Benzema 39'	Report		Stadium: Stade de Gerland; Attendance: 25,000; Referee: Hervé Piccirillo

16 April 2008	Bordeaux (1)	0–0 (a.e.t.) (3–4 p)	Sedan (2)	Bordeaux
17:00		Report		Stadium: Stade Chaban-Delmas; Attendance: 11,442; Referee: Jean-Charles Cailleux
	Penalties
	Cavenaghi (penalty missed); Jurietti (penalty missed); Alonso (penalty scored); Wendel (penalty scored); Fernando (penalty scored)		(penalty scored) Sartre; (penalty scored) Baning; (penalty scored) Sow; (penalty missed) Amalfitano; (penalty scored) Abdoun

16 April 2008	Carquefou (5)	0–1	Paris Saint-Germain (1)	Nantes
21:00		Report	Pauleta 77'	Stadium: Stade de la Beaujoire; Attendance: 30,500; Referee: Olivier Thual

== Semi-finals ==
6 May 2008	Amiens (2)	0–1	Paris Saint-Germain (1)	Amiens
20:45		Report	Boli 77'	Stadium: Stade de la Licorne; Attendance: 10,000; Referee: Tony Chapron

7 May 2008	Lyon (1)	1–0	Sedan (2)	Lyon
21:00	Juninho 88'	Report		Stadium: Stade de Gerland; Attendance: 32,000; Referee: Bertrand Layec

== Final ==
24 May 2008
21:00

Lyon	1–0 (a.e.t.)	Paris Saint-Germain
Govou 102'

Stade de France, Saint-Denis
Attendance: 79,204
Referee: Philippe Kalt

== Topscorer ==
Karim Benzema (6 goals)
