= Philippe Robert =

French photographer

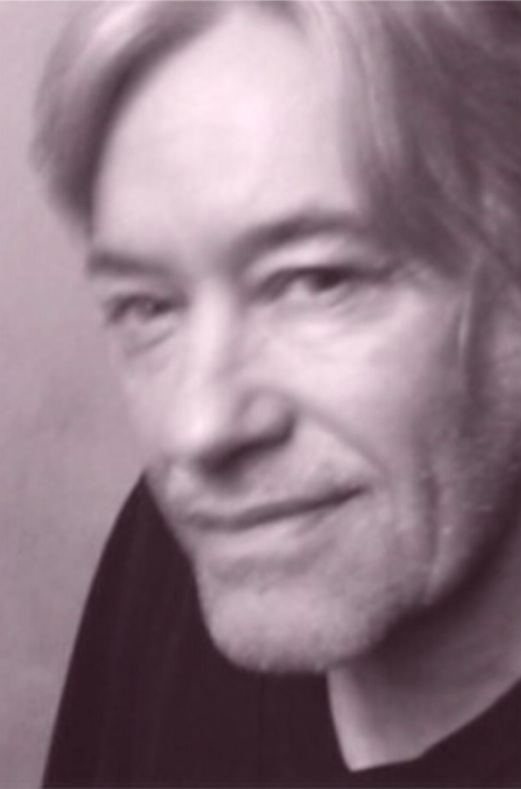
- Philippe Robert (2014)
- Born: June 24, 1953 (age 73); Lille
- Education: Institut des hautes études cinématographiques
- Occupation: Photographer
- Website: www.philipperobert.org

Philippe Robert (born June 24, 1953) is a French photographer. His work includes portraits, fashion, and advertising photos.

== Career ==
=== Education and influences ===
Philippe Robert was born in Lille and graduated from the Institute for Advanced Cinematographic Studies in Paris (Institut des Hautes Études Cinématographiques - IDHEC, 1979 cohort) where he had Henri Alekan as one of his teachers. During his studies he started to work for French television on the television show of Jean-Christophe Averty and on Giuseppe Verdi’s Simon Boccanegra, directed by Giorgio Strehler at Paris National Opera. After graduating from IDHEC, he enrolled at UCLA Film School and did an internship on Postman always rings twice directed by Bob Rafelson and starring Jack Nicholson.

=== Early career ===
From 1981 to 1986, Philippe Robert worked between Europe and The United States on a French television show dedicated to the cinema – Etoiles et Toiles, produced by Frédéric Mitterrand (the future French Minister of Culture and Communication). During this early stage of his career, he met French TV figures (Maurice Dugowson, Raoul Sangla, Jean-Pierre Spiero) but also American movie makers who would have an important influence on his photographic style (Samuel Fuller, Sam Peckinpah, David Lynch, Ridley Scott ...).

At that time he also started to make his first pictures shooting people that he met. He took advantage of his acquaintances with photographers close to the cinema to improve his skills, among them André Kertész. In 1984, he assisted the photographer during his last series "New Distortions", shot in Hotel Esmeralda in Paris where Kertész made the original "Distortions" series (1933). During this session, the master of photography, André Kertész, aged 90, known for his sense of humor, also made several distorted photos of his female model and young assistant, Philippe Robert.

Thanks to the journalist Philippe Garnier working for Libération and the future movie-maker Olivier Assayas working at this time for Cahiers du Cinéma, Philippe Robert met Tom Waits, who was about to release his album One from Heart (and Crystal Gayle), the original soundtrack of the Francis Ford Coppola movie of the same title (1982) and around that time he took a series of photographs of the musician. Waits introduced Robert to Bob Guccione Jr who would later lunch Spin magazine and publish Philippe Robert’s Tom Waits series in the September 1987 issue. This first publication opened the door to Robert to publish his work in American magazines such as LA Weekly, Interview Magazine, Harper's Bazaar and New York Times Magazine.

From that time Philippe Robert dedicated himself exclusively to photography. In 1987, he set up The Murder Ink production company with his friends Jean-Maue Ooghe (the television producer of the Tour de France for France Television since 1997) and Philippe Sikirdji. Thanks to Lionel Cros, a French fashion designer and image-maker, he discovered "la Haute Couture" and started to provide fashion images for French fashion magazines and their European editions.

=== Career ===
As he started to work as a fashion photographer, Philippe Robert met French major fashion photography figures. In 1990, while shooting his first series for the Italian Harper's Bazaar, he shared the magazine's studio with Guy Bourdin. In October 1990, Philippe Robert photographed German ELLE cover. A Russian model, Ludmila Isaieva, was chosen for this historic cover of the first issue after German reunification. Top-models like Carla Bruni, French actresses such as Sophie Marceau, Mathilda May and singers, Lio and Sylvie Vartan posed for him in Lionel Cros outfits. Béatrice Dalle posed in Azzedine Alaïa. For Thierry Mugler, he shot top-models and his muses such as Brandi Quiñones, Helena Christensen, Linda Evangelista, Naomi Campbell, first in the outfits from Mugler's show in Palais de Tokyo in what they would later wear in George Michael's "Too Funky" video-clip directed by Thierry Mugler.

This began for Philippe Robert a long and intense period of artistic creativity. For over 10 years he was assisted by Laurent Caron who created his own production company IOROPE, in the early 2000s. True to his education and artistic background, Robert collaborated in multiplies multiple ways that mixed fashion, movie and music. He contributed photographs for widely diverse publications. These included popular fashion magazines (ELLE, Harper's Bazaar, Marie-Claire ...); specialized press (Max : French and Italian editions, Paris Match, Photo, VSD ...); luxury magazines (Ritz ...); ambitious hype magazines (City International Magazine, Sans Nom – ancestor of Citizen K) and occasionally trash press (Loaded).

Since the beginning of the 2000s, the photographer has experimented new photographic tools, including shooting with disposable cameras or mobile phones. Applying image treatment software to some of these photos that can be printed in postcard size, he has reconnected with his experiences while working with André Kertész. New and more intimate subjects have appeared in his work: Paris and Île Saint-Louis where he lives, his son, nature....

From the mid-2000s, Philippe Robert has regularly exhibited his work in galleries and photography festivals that promotes fashion photography in Europe and The United States. Since 2005, he is regularly exhibited at the Cannes International Fashion Photography Festival that show large size photos in the city sites such as La Croisette, Casino Palm Beach and the Hôtel Martinez. Since 2008, he has worked with Art Photo Expo, a gallery known for its participation to Art Basel Miami Beach (2007, and 2008, editions) and who shows his works in New York and Miami and online. Some of his photographs can be seen in this gallery catalog, among major fashion photographers works.

== Style ==
Philippe Robert made his name in the beginning of 1990 with his photographs of self-confident women, women who are comfortable wearing outfits of fashion designers who undress them while dressing them. Although together with Jean-Baptiste Mondino and Stephane Sednaoui he is one of the French photographers who brought "erotic touch" to the fashion photography, he said at the beginning of his career that his main ambition was to catch his models' beauty and individuality and not to create shock images. His photographs are minimalistic. As does Richard Avedon that Robert considers as a master, he shots in an empty studio. Facing the camera alone the models "give themselves" – an expression that the photographer uses to imply an offering of themselves to the photograph beyond mere posing.

== Works ==
=== Fashion and advertising ===
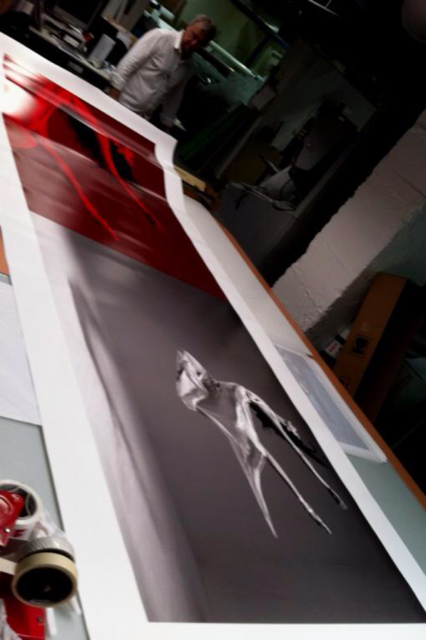
Dorothée Gilbert, Prima Ballerina of Paris National Opera by Philippe Robert (2008). Print of the photography in the print studio of Yonnel Le Blanc (2013)

Philippe Robert works with many brands known worldwide: Chanel, Chloé, Dior, Eunué, Evil, Giorgio Armani, Guerlain, Hermès, Lanvin, Louis Vuitton, Miu Miu, Naf-Naf, Ralph Lauren, Well and Yves Saint Laurent. He shoots their fashion series and advertising campaigns with models and supermodels (Estella Warren, Naf-Naf, 2005), actresses (Nora Arnezeder, Guerlain, 2009; Marine Vacth, Chanel, 2010) and figures (rugby player Sebastien Chabal, Chanel, 2010).

He made his first advertising photographs while working with the French singer Lio who launched her own fashion line for Prisunic, a retail chain, in the early 1990s. Lio mentions that collaboration in her biography which contains a collection of her favorite photographs (Jean-Baptiste Mondino, Pierre and Gilles and Philippe Robert).

Later on, Robert worked with the agency CLM BBDO and with Philippe Chanet as artistic director, on the campaign for the French fashion brand Kookaï. and on a Well (stockings brand) campaign. He shot "Etastivoile" line, the other lines are assigned to Nathaniel Goldberg and Bettina Rheims.

=== Fashion and magazines ===
Philippe Robert creates covers and fashion editorials for French and European magazines, working with female models and supermodels such as, among others, Julie Anderson, Carla Bruni, Helena Christensen, Vera Cox, Angie Everhart, Noémie Lenoir, Inès Sastre, female artists (Béatrice Dalle, Arielle Dombasle, Sophie Marceau, Sylvie Vartan ...) and occasionally with men (Nicholas Rogers).

In 2008, he shot a fashion series with the prima ballerinas of the Paris National Opera (Emilie Cozette, Dorothée Gilbert, Marie-Agnès Gillot, Agnès Letestu, Delphine Moussin, Clairemarie Osta, Laëtitia Pujol. Except Aurélie Dupont who pregnant at the time). It was the first time that this institution which exercises strict control of their stars activities allowed them to be shot all at the same time and in a studio outside the Opera.

In 2008, as Carla Bruni became French First Lady thanks to her marriage with the French President Nicolas Sarkozy, Philippe Robert’s photographs of the former top-model met international attention. In February 2008, Italian men’s magazine Max published a series of photographs, originally published in the 1990s in its several European editions. Carla Bruni posed in Lionel Cros sexy outfits. In the September of the same year Art Photo Expo gallery exhibited in New York a selection of Robert diptychs showing Carla Bruni in Lionel Cros, Thierry Mugler as well as nude. In July 2011, the ambitious Dutch Holland’s Diep magazine used a Philippe Robert’s portrait of Carla Bruni, a photograph that had been on the cover of Spanish ELLE in February 1995.

=== People in cinema and show business ===
He frequently photographs actors (Monica Bellucci, Virginie Ledoyen, Robert Mitchum ...), artists (Gilbert and George ...), French TV popular figures (Edouard Bauer, Claire Chazal, Marie Drucker ...) and athletes (Jean Galfione ...). Occasionally, he produces images for cinema and makes movie posters (Jean-Claude Carrière, Claude Zidi).

Thanks to these collaborations, in 2002, several TV figures and actors agreed to pose for Philippe Robert with an "impossible partner" for a large AIDS prevention campaign. Such "impossible" pairings included Marc-Olivier Fogiel & Ariane Massenet, Bruno Solo & Yvan Le Bolloc’h, Nicos & Laurence Boccolini. Under a "Make Love" slogan, he showed them nearly naked and in suggestive poses. The pictures were circulated in all European French language speaking countries on large posters, plastic bags and postcards distributed in the Hachette Fillippacci Media group newsstands. The President of "SIDA Action Info", the association who was heading the campaign declared: "With [Philippe Robert] it couldn’t be vulgar and that was reassuring".

=== Music ===
Although his Tom Waits' series opened to Philippe Robert fashion magazines doors, it wasn't just a springboard. He continued to work with the music industry, providing images for music labels such as BMG and East West. He produced promotion photographs for musicians and worked on albums covers (Patrick Bruel - album Bruel, 1994, single Bouge !; David Guetta (first Palace compilation), Guns N' Roses; Willy DeVille, Horse of a different color, 1999; and Phenix Horns).

His fashion editorials are inspired by these collaborations. Either in his Carla Bruni series or his shots of Paris National Opera's Prima Ballerina, Philippe Robert catches his models rock 'n' roll attitudes and movements and makes the music enter his fashion images.

== Exhibitions ==
- 1990 : Small exhibition during the Fashion Show of Lionel Cros, upon the exhibition Threats of Hell of Richard Serra, Grande nef du Centre d’Arts Plastiques Contemporains - CAPC Musée d'art contemporain, Bordeaux (France), (November 21)
- 1993 : Festival de la Photo de Mode, exhibition at Hôtel de Paris, Monte Carlo (Monaco)
- 1994 : Music stars by fashion stars, Virgin Mégastore at Carrousel du Louvre, Paris (France) / 5th International Festival of Fashion Photography, Carrousel du Louvre, Paris (France)
- 1995 : "Cinema against AIDS", small exhibition during annual gala of Elizabeth Taylor's American Foundation for AIDS Research upon Cannes Festival (Cannes, France)
- 2005 : 3rd International Festival of Fashion Photography, exhibition at Croisette & Casino Palm Beach, Cannes (France) / Dubaï Fashion Week, Dubaï
- 2006 : "Diptyques", personalexhibition, galerie Les Visionnaires, Paris (France) / " Fashion & Photojournalisme ", auction at SVV Thierry de Maigret - Drouot, Paris (France)
- 2007 : 5th International Festival of Fashion Photography, exhibition at Croisette, Cannes (France)
- 2008 : 6th International Festival of Fashion Photography, exhibition at Croisette & Casino Palm Beach, Cannes (France) / "Portraiture", NYPH Festival, Contour-Getty/Martin Parr, New York
- 2009 : 7th International Festival of Fashion Photography, exhibition at Hotel Martinez, Cannes (France) / " The Master Fashion Photographers ", Art Photo Expo Galery, New York, (September 2009 – February 2010)
- 2010 : Art Photo Expo Galery, Art Basel Miami Beach, Miami (US)
- 2012 : 10th International Festival of Fashion Photography, exhibition at Croisette, Cannes (France)
- 2015 : "Photographie", Artcurial, Paris (France)
