= Zahia Dehar =

Algerian model and fashion designer

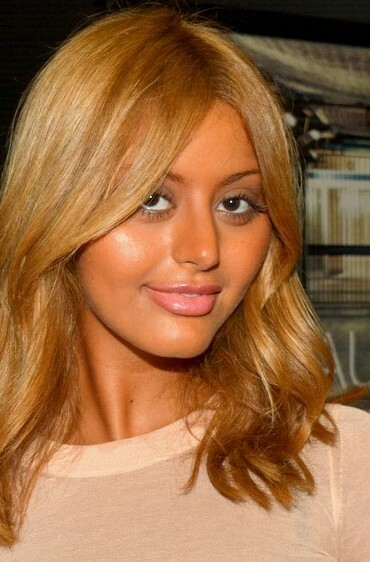
- Dehar in 2016
- Born: 25 February 1992 (age 34); Ghriss, Algeria
- Occupations: Fashion and lingerie designer; model; actress
- Years active: 2010–present
- Website: zahiazd.com

Zahia Dehar (Arabic: زاهية ديهار, born 25 February 1992) is an Algerian-French model, actress, fashion and lingerie designer.

In the past involved in sex work, Dehar is best known for having been involved in a sex scandal involving footballers at a time when she decided to escort high-end clientele as a minor.

== Early life ==
Zahia Dehar was born in Ghriss, Algeria, on 25 February 1992 to Hacène, a fuel truck driver, and Yamina, a homemaker. She moved to Champigny-sur-Marne, France with her mother and younger brother at the age of 10. She entered into sex work at the age of sixteen, and was successful in high-end sex work, earning up to €20,000 per month at the rate of €1,000 or €2,000 a time.

As of 2010, her father, Hacène Dehar, still lives in Algeria. He has refused any form of contact with his daughter since the sex work allegations appeared.

== Sex scandal ==
Karim Benzema was accused of paying Zahia Dehar, then 16, €500 for sexual services at a Paris hotel in May 2008. Benzema was 20 years old. He denied the allegations and denied ever having met Zahia Dehar. He was later acquitted, and his lawyer, Sylvain Cormier, stated that the case had not affected his professional football career.

Franck Ribéry admitted to having a sexual relationship with Zahia Dehar but denied paying her €700. He also stated that he did not know her age at the time. The age of consent in France is 16, but prostitution was legal at the time only if the prostitute was over the age of 18.

The case started to come to light during an investigation by the Brigade de répression du proxénétisme into the activities of Abousofiane Moustaid, also known as "Abou Sofiane", a former contestant on Nouvelle Star who became the host of a celebrity show on the TNT channel. The authorities were particularly interested in the Zaman Café, a Parisian bar, part of whose turnover came from prostitution. After the administrative closure of the establishment, the police officers questioned the prostitutes who worked there. They discovered that one of them, Zahia Dehar, started to work there while she was still a minor, and had also served several footballers. The young woman claimed to have met Karim Benzema in May 2008 on the sidelines of the Trophées UNFP du football ceremony, and to have met Franck Ribéry on 7 April 2009, in a hotel in Munich where she and another escort had been sent to join the footballer, as a "birthday present" for the latter. Zahia Dehar was interviewed three times in April 2010; she insisted that she did not inform either man that she was then only 16.

The investigation became public in 2010, just before the French team participated in the 2010 FIFA World Cup. The then-current French national team manager Raymond Domenech cited Benzema's struggle for form with his new club Real Madrid rather than his alleged involvement in the sex scandal as his reason for excluding the striker from the squad.

In July 2010, Ribéry and Benzema were indicted for "solicitation of minor prostitute", an offence punishable in France by up to three years in prison and a €45,000 fine. Another member of the team, Sidney Govou, was also interviewed; however, he avoided prosecution as the investigation revealed that his meeting with Zahia took place after she had reached the age of maturity.

The mediatization of Dehar started from this case. Very quickly, her face was revealed by the media, and many photos of her circulated on the web, making the young woman a real "Internet phenomenon". Le Monde initially revealed her name, simply calling her "Zahia D." In May 2010, she gave an interview to Paris Match, which revealed her full name. She gave her version of the case and declared, among other things, "I consider myself an escort, but not a prostitute" (providing support services without having sex with the client), and denied having a pimp or belonging to a network.

The case continued until the mid-2010s. In late 2011, the Paris prosecutor asked for a dismissal for Ribéry and Benzema; but in August 2012, nine people were sent back by the investigating judge to the criminal court, including Benzema and Ribéry for "solicitation of minor prostitute".

On 31 January 2014, Benzema and Ribéry were acquitted by the criminal court of Paris, the court saying that even assuming sexual acts had occurred, the players were unaware that Zahia Dehar was underage. Five other suspects, including Abou Sofiane, who acted as a "matchmaker" between the young woman and footballers, were convicted for procuring. Abou Sofiane appealed and published a book in which he claimed his innocence and accused Dehar of having taken advantage of his address book. In June 2015, the Court of Appeal confirmed his conviction and he received a heavier sentence.

Dehar's involvement in the scandal and other acts, such as posting indiscreet photos on Twitter, have earned her the nickname la scandaleuse ("the scandalous one") in the French press.

== Post-2010 ==
Dehar achieved celebrity status as a result of the scandal. She capitalized on her fame by modelling for various artists such as Pierre et Gilles and Karl Lagerfeld, and became a fashion and lingerie designer.

=== Modelling ===
In February 2011, the American and Spanish editions of V magazine published a twelve-page tribute to Brigitte Bardot, It included several photos of Dehar shot in New York, marking her return in the media. To publicise her modelling a website was officially launched on 1 March 2011.

In late May 2011, photographer and director Greg Williams featured Dehar in a futuristic short film entitled Bionic. The following month, Pierre et Gilles created a painting representing her as Eve. "An artistic and friendly thunderbolt was born our new Eve. Dehar: magical beautiful, innocent and luminous, she is the dream model" declared the two artists about this piece. In August 2011, Alix Malka photographed Dehar for the Italian edition of the American fashion magazine Vanity Fair, which also contained an interview with Dehar.

In the last quarter of 2011, her appearances in the media were less common, although she was photographed with Christian Louboutin and Farida Khelfa, at a shoe exhibition at the Galerie du Passage in November 2011. A few months later, Pierre Passebon produced a lingerie exhibition "Zahia de 5 à 7", which had the effect of re-kindling interest in her by the press.

After a brief eclipse, Dehar experienced a resurgence of media exposure at the beginning of 2012: a new series of photographs, shot by Karl Lagerfeld in January 2012, was published just after her first lingerie show. She was photographed by Ali Mahdavi, artistic director of the Crazy Horse, in February for an article that Françoise-Marie Santucci wrote about Dehar in Libération "Next". Then the same month, Isabelle Adjani announced her intention to produce a documentary about Dehar, in collaboration with Farida Khelfa.

Another series of photos was shot by photographer Ellen von Unwerth after Dehar's second lingerie show in July 2012.

In December 2013, Dehar returned to the lens of Alix Malka for the magazine 7 Hollywood, published on the 15th of the month.

From 8 April to 27 September 2014, Pierre et Gilles exhibition, at the Galerie des Gobelins (Paris), an exhibit of an envelope richly adorned with a portrait of Dehar, was specially made for the occasion.

A resolute vegetarian, she became one of PETA's European "muses" in June 2015, posing for musician and photographer Bryan Adams in a campaign entitled "Have a heart, become a vegetarian".

In November 2015, a few hours before the attacks in Paris, the artists Pierre et Gilles published on their Facebook account a photo taken a few months ago, Dehar posing as Marianne. This photograph was used on social networks as a response to the terrorist acts that occurred on that evening.

In 2019 she featured on the cover of Les Inrockuptibles. The Guardian called her the "summer star" of French cinema following her appearance in An Easy Girl. In 2023, she was on the digital cover of Vanity Fair France.

=== Lingerie ===
In 2010, several brands were registered with the European Union Intellectual Property Office (EUIPO), including: Zahia, Zahia Dehar, Pretty Zahia, Zahiadora, Zahiadise and A dream by Zahia. The name Zahia and several derived words are thus claimed as private property, for several sectors of activity such as massage oils, cosmetics, travel bags, jewellery, condoms, and the production of films and broadcasts. (Most of these brand names, according to the official website of the EUIPO, are not in use.)

The first presentation of her lingerie collection, "ligne de tenues d'intérieur légères, raffinées", which was mostly trendy pink, was on 25 January 2012 at the Palais de Chaillot during the French fashion week, in the presence of many professionals of fashion. Dehar herself closed the half-naked parade in the traditional tulle wedding dress decorated with cherry blossom petals, and embroidered with Swarovski rhinestones. A second collection was presented a few months after.

The launch of the two lingerie collections was funded by First Mark Investments, an investment fund based in Hong Kong that supports young designers.

== Filmography ==
Year	Title	Role	Notes
2016	Joséphine, Pregnant & Fabulous	Lola	
2019	An Easy Girl	Sofia	
2023	Escort Boys		S1/E4
2023	Drag Race France	Herself	Guest judge Season 2 Episode: "It's Show Night"

== See also ==
- Zahia affair
