= Sidney Govou =

French footballer (born 1979)

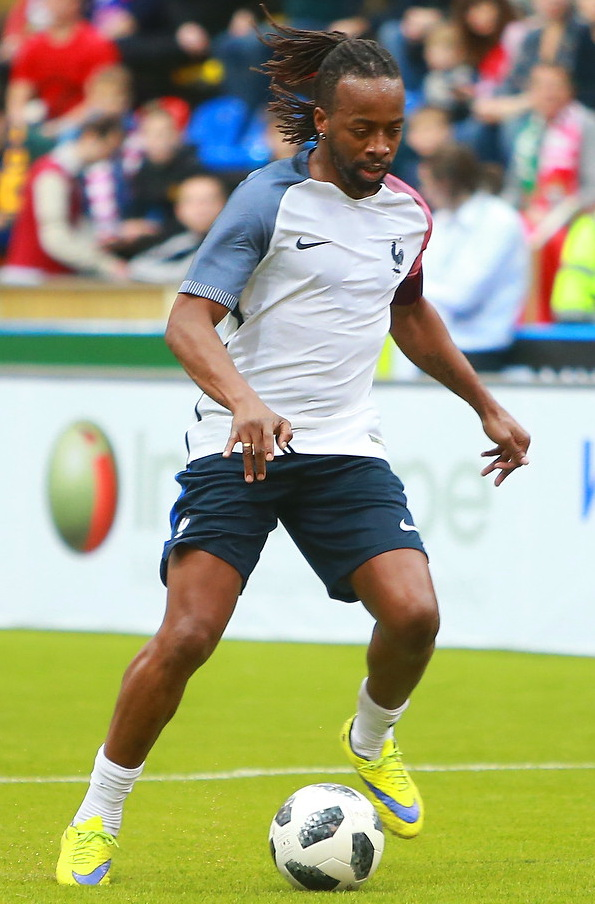
- Govou in 2018

Personal information
- Full name: Sidney Rodrigue Noukpo Govou
- Date of birth: 27 July 1979 (age 47)
- Place of birth: Le Puy-en-Velay, France
- Height: 1.75 m (5 ft 9 in)
- Positions: Striker; left winger

Youth career
- 1992–1996: Brives-Charensac
- 1996–1997: CO Le Puy
- 1997–2000: Lyon

Senior career*
Years	Team	Apps	(Gls)
2000–2010	Lyon	292	(49)
2010–2011	Panathinaikos	24	(3)
2011–2013	Évian	36	(1)
2013–2014	Lyon B	2	(0)
2014–2015	Monts d'Or Azergues	28	(0)
2015	FC Miami City	11	(3)
2015–2017	Limonest	24	(2)
Total		417	(58)

International career
2002–2010	France	49	(10)
Medal record
Men's football
Representing France
FIFA Confederations Cup
Winner	2003
FIFA World Cup
Runner-up	2006
- * Club domestic league appearances and goals

Sidney Rodrigue Noukpo Govou (born 27 July 1979) is a French former professional footballer who played primarily as a left winger, but was occasionally deployed as a striker. He is most prominent for his lengthy playing career at Lyon where he won seven Ligue 1 titles.

== Club career ==
=== Lyon ===
Staying at school to complete his studies to a comparatively late age for a footballer, Govou was a late-comer to the sporting world, joining Lyon's youth academy at the age of 17 in 1996. Loyal to his first club, until 2010, Govou had played at the Stade Gerland for his entire professional career. Govou broke onto the scene during the 2000–01 Ligue 1 season helping Lyon finish in second, just four points behind champions FC Nantes. Because of his great performances for the club, Govou won the 2001 Young Player of the Year Award in Ligue 1.

During the 2004–05 season, Paul Le Guen handed Govou the captain's armband during the long absence of club captain Claudio Caçapa due to injury. Le Guen's decision was largely motivated by the loyalty displayed towards the club by Govou, in face of much speculation linking him with moves away from the club. Indeed, for the last three seasons, Govou had been regularly linked to possible transfers away from Lyon, much helped by Govou's admittance to finding the possibility of playing abroad an attractive one. On 24 May 2008, Govou scored the only goal of the game in added extra time, volleying home a cross, and was named "Man of the Match" as Lyon defeated PSG in the final of the Coupe de France, the club's first cup success since 1973.

Govou and Lyon endured a difficult 2009–10 Ligue 1 campaign. He appeared in 30 league games for Lyon, starting 22, but managed just two goals and two assists as Lyon finished runners up to Olympique de Marseille. In November 2009, Lyon hosted Marseille at the Stade Gerland in what would become an epic encounter. Govou scored a memorable goal in the 14th minute, making a sensational run with the ball from beyond midfield and then slotting it past Steve Mandanda to give the hosts a 2–1 lead. The game would go back and forth for the rest of the match, with Lyon leading 5–4 in the 90th minute until an own goal from teammate Jérémy Toulalan meant that the points would be shared. Lyon eventually finished in second spot, securing an automatic place in the group stage of the Champions League.

=== Panathinaikos ===
On 2 July 2010, Govou signed a three-year contract with Panathinaikos in Greece, with the playmaker reportedly earning €1.5 million a year. On 14 September 2010, he scored against FC Barcelona at the Camp Nou to give Panathinaikos the lead, although they eventually lost the game 5–1. On 2 July 2011, it was announced by Panathinaikos that Govou had been released from the club by mutual consent. The player was partly released because of Panathinaikos' financial problems, and it was reported that other French players Djibril Cissé and Jean-Alain Boumsong would exit to free up the cheque book. During his time at the club, he was punished twice for inappropriate behavior related to "late night activities." Govou appeared in 24 games and scored three goals in all competitions for Panathinaikos.

=== Évian ===
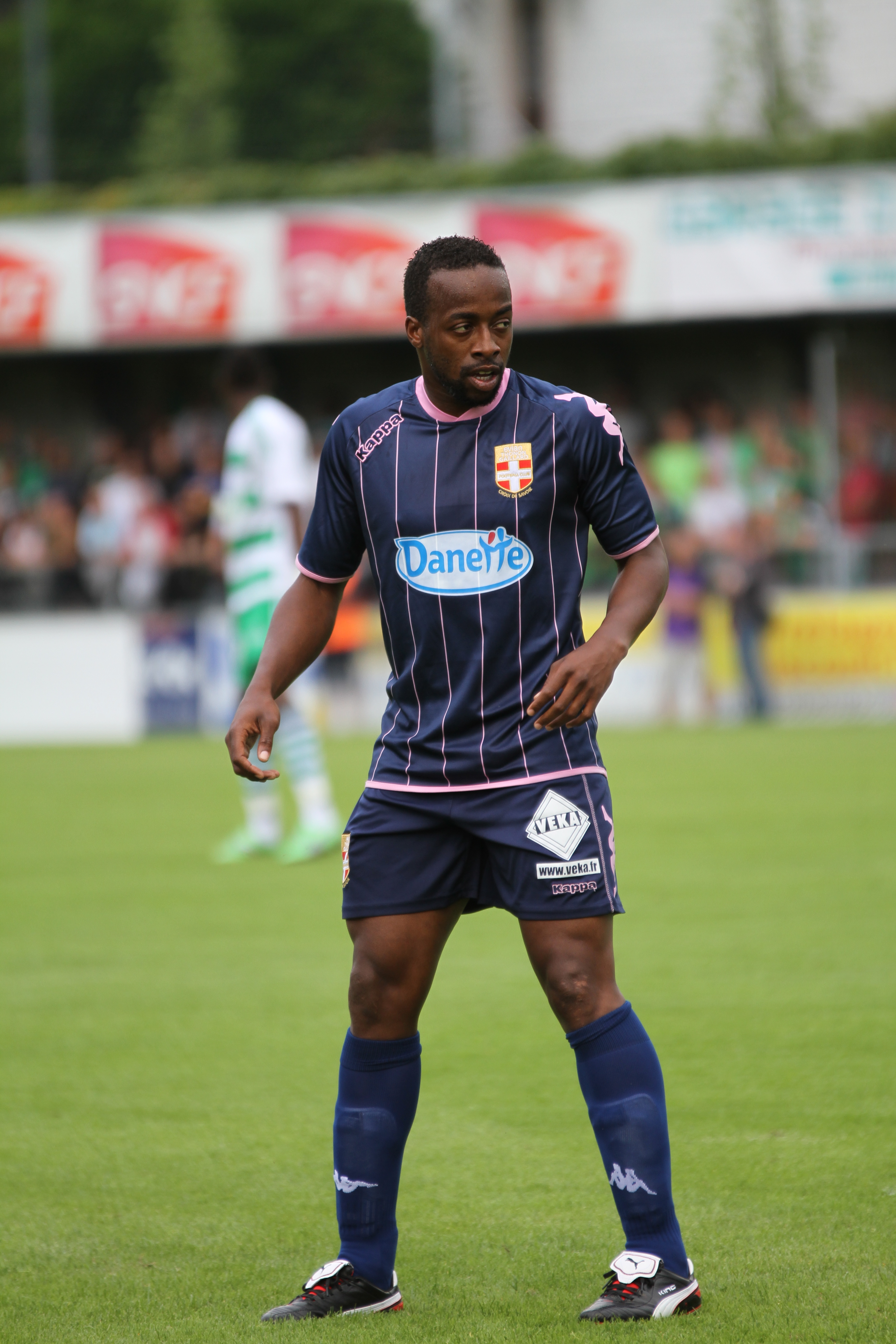
Govou playing for Evian in 2011

On 5 July 2011, Govou signed a two-year contract with newly promoted Ligue 1 side Évian. He made his debut for the club in their first ever Ligue 1 game away to Stade Brest. Govou played the full 90 minutes and helped his new squad to a 2–2 draw, earning their first ever point in the French top flight.

Govou recorded his first goal for Évian in a 3–2 defeat to Stade Rennais on 7 February 2012, a result which eliminated his side from the Coupe de France in the Round of 16. His first league goal came 11 days later when he netted a 90th-minute equalizer to prevent Stade Malherbe Caen from getting all three points.

Govou made his first appearance of the 2012–13 Ligue 1 season on 24 August 2012, replacing Daniel Wass in the 90th minute of a 1–1 draw with former club Lyon. On 10 November, Govou provided the assist from which Youssef Adnane scored the game-winning goal for Evian, a 2–1 defeat of Reims.

=== Return to Lyon ===
In October 2013, Govou signed with his former club Lyon on an amateur contract, restricting him to play only with the club's reserve team.

=== Monts d'Or Azergues ===
On 27 January 2014, Govou signed with fourth division side Monts d'Or Azergues, partnering up with former International Ludovic Giuly. 21 February, rumours surfaced Govou had been fired by the club for participating in the viral Internet drinking game Neknomination. However, the club denied taking any action against the player the following day.

=== FC Miami City ===
On 1 June 2015, Govou signed with FC Miami City in the USL Premier Development League (PDL), the fourth tier of the American Soccer Pyramid, in the Southeast Division.

=== FC Limonest ===
After his time in Miami, Govou returned to France to play for FC Limonest in the Championnat de France Amateur 2 (5th tier) from 2015 to 2017. He made approximately 24 appearances and scored 2 goals before retiring. Following his retirement, he remained with the club, serving as a sporting advisor (conseiller sportif) starting in 2018.

== International career ==
Govou was not selected initially for the Euro 2004 or 2006 World Cup competitions, but was called up to join the French squads to replace players Ludovic Giuly and Djibril Cissé, respectively, both suffering injuries shortly before the start of the competitions.

Govou scored two goals in France's 3–1 win over world champions Italy in a Euro 2008 qualifier. The game was the first meeting between the two teams since Italy beat France in the 2006 World Cup Final. Govou scored his first goal by heading, just 67 seconds into the game. His second came in the 55th minute.

Govou also represented his country at the 2010 World Cup in South Africa. Govou appeared in all three group games for France, as Les Bleus finished last in Group A and managed just one goal. Govou started against Uruguay and Mexico and came on as a late substitute against South Africa.

== Personal life ==
Govou was born in France, and is of Beninese descent. He married Clémence Catherin on 18 June 2011 at Replonges (Ain, France). To date, they have two children: a son named Marley, born 25 February 2009, and a daughter named Jude, born on 20 February 2014. He has also, with his ex-girlfriend Pascale, an elder daughter named Naomy, born on 11 February 2005.

On 18 April 2010, it was first reported by French television service M6 that four members of the France national team were being investigated for their roles as clients of a prostitution ring that was being operated inside of a Paris nightclub with some of the women possibly being underage. The report also stated that two of the players were already questioned as witnesses by judge André Dando and a group of magistrates. The report described the two players as being one who "is a major player in a big foreign club" and that the other "plays in the championship of France Ligue 1". Later that day, the players were discovered to be Govou, Karim Benzema and Franck Ribéry. On 29 April, the country's Secretary of State for Sports Rama Yade, after refusing to publicly comment on the case in its infancy, declared that any player placed under investigation should not represent the France national team. The following day, a judicial source confirmed that the players would not be placed under official investigation, if at all, before the start of the 2010 FIFA World Cup. On 20 July, they were questioned by Paris police and, following questioning, was indicted by judge Dando on the charge of "solicitation of a minor prostitute". In November 2011 prosecutors asked for the cases against them to be dropped, saying that the players were not aware that the escort, identified as Zahia Dehar, was 16 years old when they had paid to have sex with her.

== Career statistics ==
=== International ===
Appearances and goals by national team and year
National team	Year	Apps	Goals
France
France	2002	3	1
France	2003	6	1
France	2004	5	1
France	2005	5	0
France	2006	6	2
France	2007	5	2
France	2008	7	3
France	2009	5	0
France	2010	7	0
Total		49	10

Scores and results list France's goal tally first, score column indicates score after each Govou goal.

List of international goals scored by Sidney Govou
No.	Date	Venue	Opponent	Score	Result	Competition
1	12 October 2002	Stade de France, Saint-Denis, France	Slovenia	5–0	5–0	UEFA Euro 2004 qualification
2	20 June 2003	Stade Geoffroy-Guichard, Saint-Étienne, France	Japan	2–1	2–1	2003 FIFA Confederations Cup
3	18 February 2004	King Baudouin Stadium, Brussels, Belgium	Belgium	1–0	2–0	Friendly
4	6 September 2006	Stade de France, Saint-Denis, France	Italy	1–0	3–1	UEFA Euro 2008 qualification
5	6 September 2006	Stade de France, Saint-Denis, France	Italy	3–1	3–1	UEFA Euro 2008 qualification
6	16 November 2007	Stade de France, Saint-Denis, France	Morocco	1–1	2–2	Friendly
7	21 November 2007	Olimpiysky, Kyiv, Ukraine	Ukraine	2–1	2–2	UEFA Euro 2008 qualification
8	20 August 2008	Ullevi, Gothenburg, Sweden	Sweden	2–1	3–2	Friendly
9	20 August 2008	Ullevi, Gothenburg, Sweden	Sweden	3–1	3–2	Friendly
10	6 September 2008	Ernst Happel Stadion, Vienna, Austria	Austria	1–2	1–3	2010 FIFA World Cup qualification

== Honours ==
Lyon

- Division/Ligue 1: 2001–02, 2002–03, 2003–04, 2004–05, 2005–06, 2006–07, 2007–08
- Coupe de France: 2007–08
- Coupe de la Ligue: 2000–01
- Trophée des Champions: 2002, 2004, 2005, 2007

France

- FIFA Confederations Cup: 2003
- FIFA World Cup runner-up: 2006

Individual

- Division 1 Young Player of the Year: 2000–01

== See also ==
- Zahia Affair
