= Max (French magazine) =

French men's magazine

Max is a men's magazine published in several European countries, including Italy, France, Germany, Greece, and Spain, as well as in Australia. Max was published In France from 1989 to 2006, and in Italy from 1985 to 2013.

== Theme ==
Max magazine targeted to a male audience, and portrayed as a male counterpart of women's magazines, not hesitating to use provocation, shock titles and bare photos.

In February 2008, Max Italia republished a fashion editorial of Carla Bruni-Sarkozy in Lionel Cros and Thierry Mugler futuristic and sexy outfits, shot by Philippe Robert for Harper's Bazaar Italia in 1991, and first published in the magazine's several European editions in 1992.

Melania Knauss, who would later become the wife of Donald Trump, appeared in the magazine's January 1996 issue.
