= Ellen von Unwerth =

German photographer (born 1954)

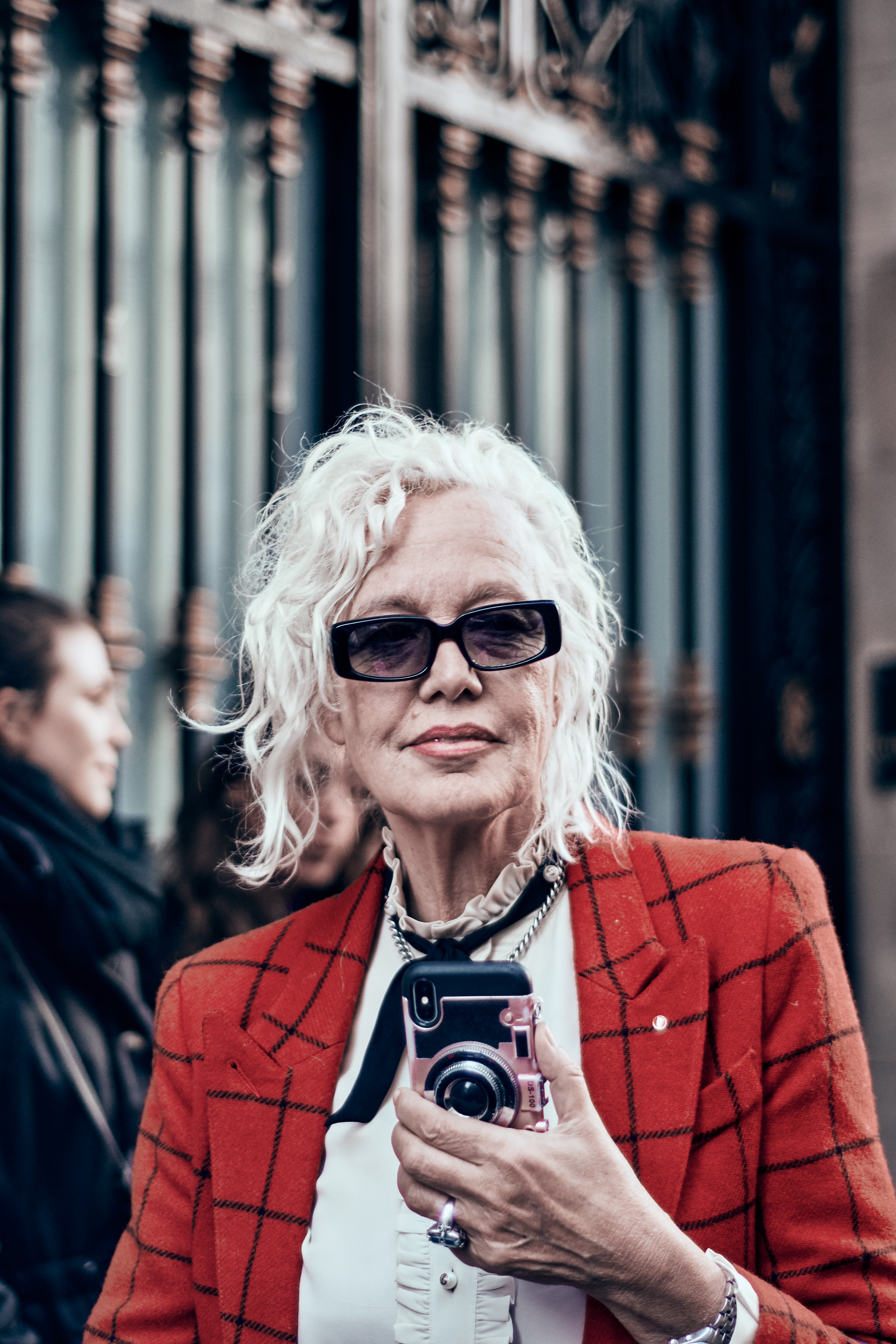
- Ellen von Unwerth, 2019
- Born: 1954 (age 71–72); Frankfurt, West Germany
- Occupation: Photographer
- Awards: Editorial, Advertising and Fashion Photography award – Royal Photographic Society; 2020
- Website: ellenvonunwerth.com

Ellen von Unwerth (born 1954) is a German photographer. She began her career as a fashion model, before becoming a fashion, editorial, and advertising photographer.

== Early life and education ==
Unwerth was born in Frankfurt, West Germany. As an orphan, during her early childhood, she often ended up in Bavarian foster care systems. Eventually, Unwerth was able to graduate high school in Munich, where she would work as a circus magician's assistant for three years.

== Modelling ==
At the age of twenty while walking down the street, Unwerth was asked by a photographer if she ever thought about having a modeling career. She decided to give modeling a chance and moved to Paris where she had a successful modeling career for 7 years.

== Photography ==
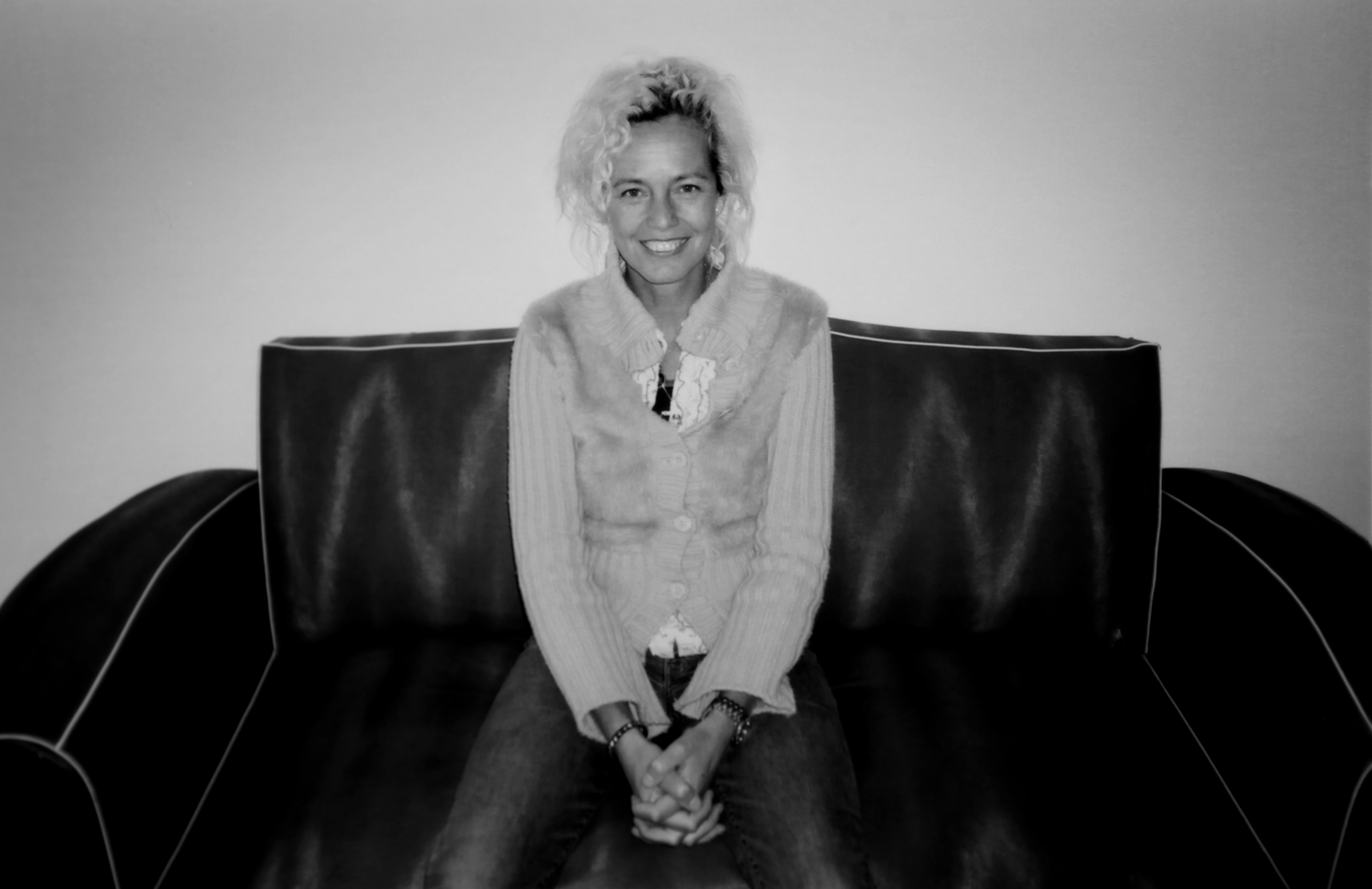
Unwerth in Paris, 2003

However, Unwerth felt that as a model, she did not have the freedom to decide where and how her image would be used. Her boyfriend at the time gave her a camera, leading to an impromptu photo shoot in Kenya by her of her model colleagues. When the photos were published, Unwerth decided that this was the new path she would take in life, as the demand for her photography skills outgrew her demand as a model.

Unwerth's first notable work was when she first photographed Claudia Schiffer in 1989. Her work has been published in Vogue, Vanity Fair, Interview, The Face, Arena, Twill, L'Uomo Vogue, I-D, and Playboy, and she has published several books of photography.

Unwerth did promotional photography for Duran Duran from 1994 to 1997 and did some photography for their 1990 album Liberty and 1997 album Medazzaland. Her work has been used on other album covers including Bananarama's Pop Life (1991), Belinda Carlisle's A Woman and a Man (1996), Cathy Dennis' Am I the Kinda Girl? (1996), Janet Jackson's The Velvet Rope (1997), All Saints' Saints & Sinners (2000), Dido's Life for Rent (2003), Britney Spears' Blackout (2007), Christina Aguilera's Back To Basics (2006) and Keeps Gettin' Better: A Decade of Hits and Rihanna's Rated R and Talk That Talk. She also shot the cover of Hole's album Live Through This (1994).

She shows women in enticing ways without objectifying them. In an interview with V Magazine, she said: "I never force women to do anything, but I give them roles to play so they are always active and empowered. In a 2018 interview with Harper's Bazaar, she explained her feminist approach to photography: "The women in my pictures are always strong, even if they are also sexy. My women always look self-assured. I try to make them look as beautiful as they can because every woman wants to feel beautiful, sexy and powerful. That's what I try to do."

Unwerth's exhibition Devotion! 30 Years of Photographing Women was created for Fotografiska Stockholm in 2018, was one of the opening exhibitions at Fotografiska New York in 2019 and was exhibited at Fotografiska Tallinn in 2021 After major success with Opera Gallery Group in Monaco and London, Ellen attended her third exhibition in Opera Gallery, Beirut, Lebanon on 15 December 2018, celebrating femininity with selection of curated art work by featuring celebrities like Claudia Schiffer, Naomi Campbell and Kate Moss and other celebrities.

Unwerth photographed Melania Trump for the poster for Trump's 2026 documentary film Melania.

== Filmmaking ==
Unwerth has directed short films for fashion designers, and music videos for several pop musicians. She has directed commercials and web films for Revlon, Clinique, L'Oreal and Equinox.

== Publications ==
- Unwerth, Ellen Von (1994). Snaps. ISBN 0-944092-29-2.
- Unwerth, Ellen von (1999). Wicked. ISBN 3-88814-899-5.
- Unwerth, Ellen Von (1998). Couples. ISBN 3-8238-0367-0.
- Miller, Harland (2003). Revenge. ISBN 1-931885-14-1.
- Unwerth, Ellen Von; Mennour, Galerie Kamel (2005). Omahyra & Boyd. ISBN 2-914171-20-X.
- Plumes et Dentelles. 2005. ISBN 2-84114-772-X.
- Sischy, Ingrid (2009). Fräulein. ISBN 978-3-8365-1477-4. (collectors). Unwerth, Ellen von (2011). Fräulein. ISBN 978-3-8365-2808-5. (trade).
- Unwerth, Ellen Von (2012). The Story Of Olga. ISBN 978-3-8365-3980-7.
- Unwerth, Ellen Von; Schulz, Mark (2017). Heimat. ISBN 978-3-8365-2887-0.

== Films ==
- I Create Myself – Demi Moore (1997)
- Naomi – Katherine Hammett
- Wendybird – Kirsten Dunst; short film of Erin Fetherston's Fall/Winter collection

== Music videos ==
- "Femme Fatale" – Duran Duran (1993)
- "I Will Catch You" – Nokko (1993)
- "Ain't Nuthin' But a She Thang" – Salt-N-Pepa (1995)
- "Are 'Friends' Electric?" – Nancy Boy (1995)
- "Electric Barbarella" – Duran Duran (1997)
- "Bring It On" – N'Dea Davenport (1998)
- "I Got Trouble" – Christina Aguilera (2007)
- "Fragment One-And I Kept Hearing" – Kenneth Bager (2010)
- "Year of 4" – Beyoncé (2011)
- "Never Been in Love" – Cobra Starship ft. Icona Pop (2014)

== Awards ==
- 1991: First prize, International Festival of Fashion Photography
- 2020: Editorial, Advertising and Fashion Photography award, Royal Photographic Society, Bristol, UK
