= Zahia affair =

2010 French underage prostitution case

The Zahia affair is a series of legal proceedings that took place in France starting from 2010, involving several players of the French football team and Zahia Dehar, a victim of child sex trafficking, who was a minor at the time she was solicited for sex. The affair received significant attention in the French media.

== Background and investigation ==
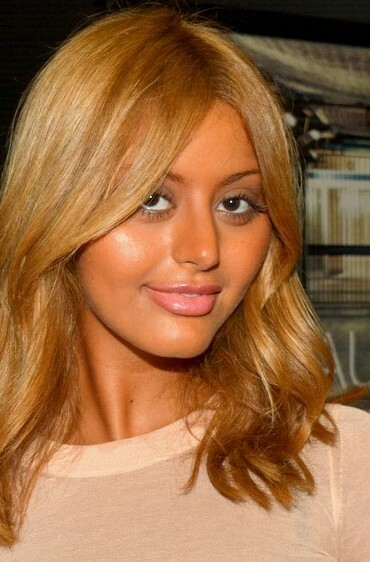
Zahia Dehar in 2016

On 12 April 2010, the brigade de répression du proxénétisme, an anti-prostitution unit of the French National Police, launched a raid on a Parisian late-night bar. An anonymous tip targeting Abousofiane Moustaïd, known as Abou Sofiane, was the source of the investigation. He was suspected of pimping. Several prostitutes were arrested as a result of the raid, with four people being indicted shortly afterwards. Subsequent hearings revealed that four players of the French football team were among the bar's clients and that one of the prostitutes was a minor at the time of the events.

The four players were identified as Hatem Ben Arfa, Karim Benzema, Sydney Govou and Franck Ribéry. According to press reports, the latter admitted to investigators that he had been seeing the underage prostitute since 2009, while claiming to be unaware that she was a minor at the time of their meetings.

Zahia Dehar was questioned three times in April 2010. According to the testimonies, she claimed to have had paid sex with Govou, Ribéry and Benzema, and stated that she had been a minor when she had sex with the latter two. According to Dehar, she never disclosed to her clients that she was a minor. She also claimed that Ribéry had flown her to Munich to entertain him on his birthday.

In May, Dehar defended the footballers in a letter to the national team’s coach, Raymond Domenech, asking him to consider the case separately when selecting his squad for the FIFA World Cup that year: "How could I have imagined, when I've always hidden my age, that their good faith could one day be called into question?" The French Football Federation (FFF) claimed that it was not aware of any letter.

In July, Benzema and Ribéry were indicted for solicitation of an underage prostitute. At the end of 2011, the Paris public prosecutor's office dismissed three of the six protagonists in the case, the two players and Ribery's brother-in-law. In August 2012, the players were referred by the examining magistrate to the Paris criminal court to be tried for solicitation of an underage prostitute.

== Trial ==
The trial of Ribéry and Benzema began in Paris in January 2014 following a postponement in 2013. The prosecutor's office maintained that the players did not know that Dehar was a minor at the time of the events, which the examining magistrate disputed. During the investigation, Ribéry acknowledged having had sexual relations with Dehar but denied paying her, while Benzema maintained that no such encounter had taken place.

On 30 January 2014, after a 10-day trial, the court dropped the charges against Franck Ribery and Karim Benzema. The five other defendants, including Abousofiane Moustaïd, Georges Farhat, Élie Farhat and Kamel Ramdani, were found guilty of pimping, and received sentences ranging from suspended prison sentences to hard time. Abu Sofiane appealed and published a book titled Zahia Killed Me, in which he defended his innocence. However, in June 2015, the Court of Appeal confirmed his conviction and increased his sentence.

The case received significant media coverage, including by Le Point. According to an article published by the news magazine in 2015, a former prostitute under the pseudonym "Sarah" revealed that Zahia Dehar had allegedly been prostituted by Yves Bouvier, a Swiss art dealer. She claims to have met Dehar during libertine evenings organised by Yves Bouvier for which the women received €2000 in cash from Bouvier. The newspaper's editorial staff, as well as the journalists Christophe Labbé and Mélanie Delattre, who had been the first to break this story, were subsequently sued for defamation by the Swissman. A similar complaint was filed against VSD. Bouvier won his case against Le Point.

== 2020 allegations ==
In 2020, the fashion icon testified again, claiming that Yves Bouvier had engaged in witness tampering. She claimed Bouvier had forced her to stay in a hotel to prevent her from appearing in court to testify against him in the trial against Le Point.

In February 2020, the lawyer of convicted pimp Abousofiane Moustaïd, Yassine Bouzrou, asked for his client's case to be revived based on the former prostitute's testimony. This testimony raises questions about the accuracy of Zahia Dehar's statement, which was heard by the brigade de répression du proxénétisme in 2010, at the time when the scandal of her paid sex with certain footballers broke out in the run-up to the 2010 FIFA World Cup.
