= Franck Ribéry =

French footballer (born 1983)

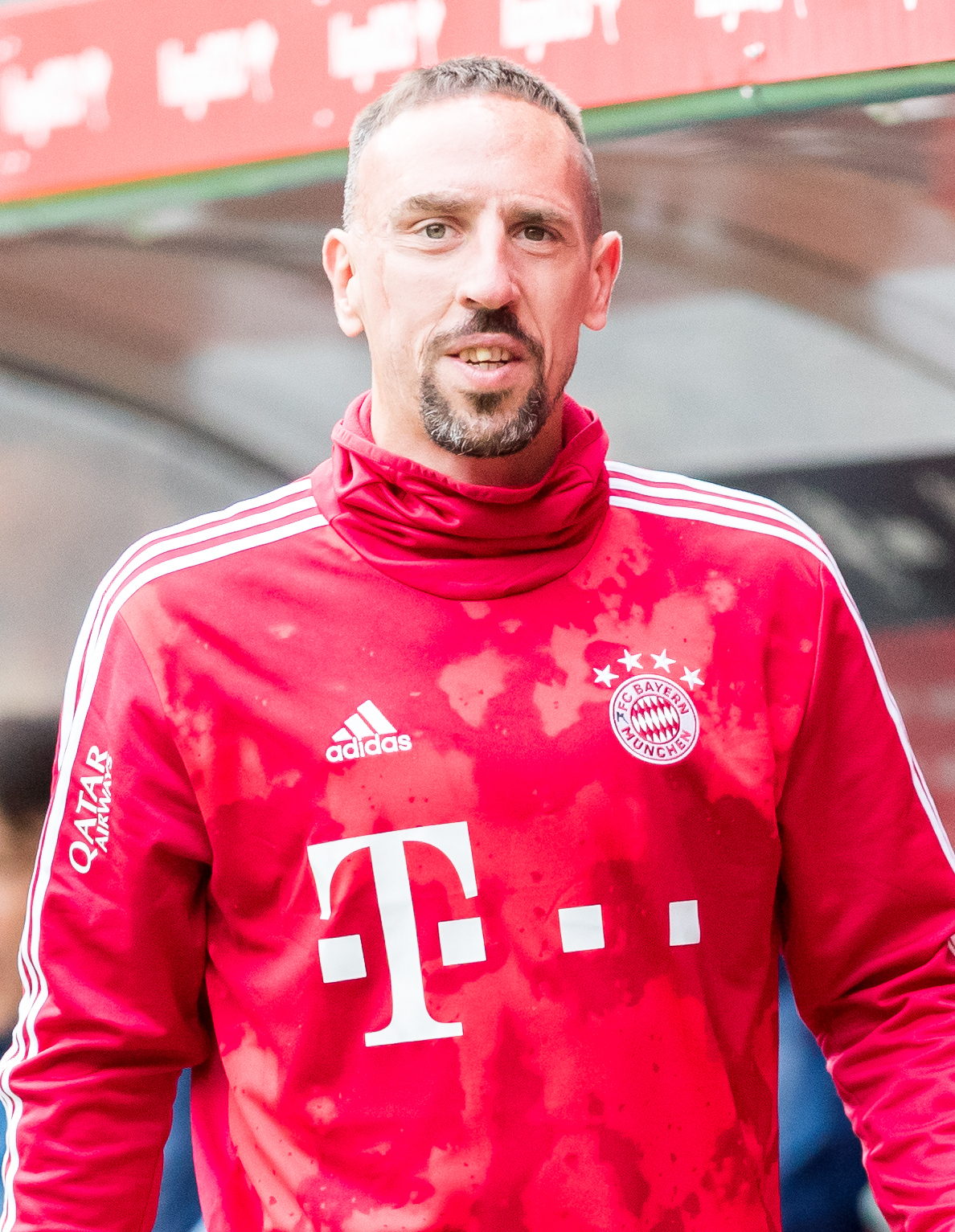
- Ribéry with Bayern Munich in 2019

Personal information
- Full name: Franck Henry Pierre Ribéry
- Date of birth: 7 April 1983 (age 43)
- Place of birth: Boulogne-sur-Mer, Pas-de-Calais, France
- Height: 1.70 m (5 ft 7 in)
- Position: Winger

Team information
- Current team: Salernitana (technical collaborator)

Youth career
- 1989–1996: Conti Boulogne
- 1996–1999: Lille
- 1999–2000: Boulogne

Senior career*
Years	Team	Apps	(Gls)
2000–2002	Boulogne	28	(6)
2002–2003	Alès	19	(1)
2003–2004	Brest	35	(3)
2004–2005	Metz	20	(2)
2005	Galatasaray	14	(0)
2005–2007	Marseille	60	(11)
2007–2019	Bayern Munich	273	(86)
2019–2021	Fiorentina	50	(5)
2021–2022	Salernitana	24	(0)
Total		523	(114)

International career
2004–2006	France U21	13	(2)
2006–2014	France	81	(16)
Medal record
Men's football
Representing France
FIFA World Cup
Runner-up	2006
- * Club domestic league appearances and goals

Franck Henry Pierre Ribéry (French pronunciation: [fʁɑ̃k ʁibeʁi]; born 7 April 1983) is a French former professional footballer who primarily played as a winger, preferably on the left side, and was known for his pace, energy, skill, and precise passing. He is regarded as one of the best players of his generation and one of the greatest wingers in the history of the sport. He is currently in charge as a technical collaborator of Italian Serie C club Salernitana, which was also his final club as a player.

In 1999, Ribéry joined US Boulogne, where he played for two years. After spending two more years in the amateur divisions with two clubs (Alès and Brest), Ribéry earned a move to Ligue 1 club Metz in 2004. After six months with the club, Ribéry moved to Turkey in January 2005 to join Galatasaray, where he won the Turkish Cup. After six months at Galatasaray, he controversially departed the club to return to France to join Marseille. Ribéry spent two seasons at the club, helping them reach the final of the Coupe de France in back-to-back seasons.

In 2007, Ribéry joined German club Bayern Munich for a then club-record fee of €25 million. In his debut season, he helped Bayern win the domestic double, his first of nine and six Bundesliga and DPB-Pokal titles, respectively. He was rewarded with the German Footballer of the Year award. In 2012–13, he was pivotal to Bayern winning the continental treble. At Bayern, he won a then club record of 24 titles over twelve seasons. Ribéry was also known for his partnership with fellow winger Arjen Robben, dubbed as Robbery. He left Bayern in summer 2019, and subsequently joined Italian side Fiorentina, while Robben retired from football. After two years in Florence, Ribery joined Salernitana, the final club of his career, before retiring in 2022.

Between 2006 and 2014, Ribéry played for the France national team 81 times. He played at two FIFA World Cups (2006 and 2010) and two UEFA European Championships (2008 and 2012). Individually, Ribéry is a three-time winner of the French Player of the Year award and also won the German award of Footballer of the Year, becoming the first player to hold both honours. He has also been named to the UEFA Team of the Year and declared the Young Player of the Year in France. In 2013, Ribéry won the UEFA Best Player in Europe Award and was nominated alongside Lionel Messi and Cristiano Ronaldo on the three-man shortlist for the 2013 FIFA Ballon d'Or.

== Early life ==
In a certain way this accident helped me. As a child it motivated me. God gave me this difference. The scars are part of me, and people will just have to take me the way I am.

— Ribéry commenting on the car accident he suffered in 1985 aged two years old.

Franck Henry Pierre Ribéry was born on 7 April 1983 in Boulogne-sur-Mer, Pas-de-Calais, and raised in a low-income neighbourhood on the fringes of the city. When he was two years old, he and his family were involved in a car accident in his hometown, colliding with a lorry; he suffered serious facial injuries that resulted in more than one hundred stitches and which left two long scars down the right side of his face, and another across his brows. Prior to joining Stade Brestois in 2003, he worked as a construction worker with his father, which Ribéry referred to as a "learning experience".

== Club career ==
=== Early career ===
Ribéry began his football career at age six playing in the youth section of amateur club FC Conti de Boulogne-sur-Mer. After a seven-year stay, in 1996, he joined professional outfit Lille, who were playing in the second division. While at Lille, Ribéry excelled athletically, but developed academic and behavioural problems, which led to Lille releasing him. In 2012, during a press conference ahead of Bayern Munich's Champions League tie against his former club Lille, Ribéry explained that he was released from the Lille academy after suffering a broken elbow and that Lille officials had previously wanted to drop him from the academy for being "too small".

After leaving Lille, Ribéry returned to his hometown joining the biggest club in the city, US Boulogne. After spending a year in the reserves, he was promoted to the senior team. Ribéry only made four appearances in his debut season as Boulogne, who were playing in the CFA, the fourth division of French football, earned promotion to third-tier Championnat National. In his second season with the club, Ribéry appeared in 25 league matches converting five goals. Although Boulogne finished 17th, which meant a return to the fourth division, Ribéry's solid performances earned him a move to fellow National club Olympique Alès. In his only season at the club, Ribéry made 18 appearances scoring only one goal.

Ribéry left the club in March due to problems with salary payments. In April 2003 he was put on trial by SM Caen during a friendly match against Laval. He also had an unsuccessful trial with Guingamp. Following the season, despite finishing safe, Alès were relegated to the Division d'Honneur, the sixth division of French football, by the DNCG after the club declared bankruptcy. In June Ribery signed with Stade Brest, another Championnat National club. At Brest, Ribéry established himself as a premier player in the league appearing in 35 league matches scoring three goals. Ribéry's performance and the team as a whole led to the club finishing second in the league, thus earning promotion to Ligue 2.

Despite his success with Brest, Ribéry sought to play in Ligue 1, the top division of French football. His dream came to fruition when Metz's manager Jean Fernandez took a liking to him and recruited him on a free transfer. Ribéry only spent half a season at Metz, but impressed earning the UNFP Player of the Month in August 2004. He scored his only league goal for Metz on 6 November in the team's 1–1 draw with Toulouse. His stellar play on the right side of midfield led to Metz supporters comparing him to Robert Pires, a former Metz player. After negotiations on an extension ended in a stalemate, Ribéry relocated to Turkey. There he joined Galatasaray, signing a three-and-a-half-year contract on 1 February 2005.

=== Galatasaray ===
At Galatasaray, Ribéry was brought in by manager Gheorghe Hagi and appeared in 14 league matches as the club finished in third-place position. While playing for the club, Galatasaray supporters nicknamed him "Ferraribery", in reference to his quick acceleration with the ball at his feet and also "Scarface" due to a large scar located on the right side of his face. In the Turkish Cup, Ribéry was instrumental in the club's 5–1 thrashing of rivals Fenerbahçe in the competition's ultimate match. He scored the opening goal in the 16th minute and also assisted on another goal. Ribéry was later substituted in the 52nd minute with Galatasaray leading 3–1. The trophy was Ribéry's first major honour.

=== Move to Marseille and CAS ruling ===
On 15 June 2005, Ribéry announced that he would be returning to France joining Ligue 1 club Marseille on a five-year contract, plus reuniting with former manager Jean Fernandez. The move was considered surprising to Galatasaray as Ribéry had three years remaining on his contract after the club paid Metz €2 million to make the loan move permanent on 30 March. Ribéry argued that he had not been paid his wages by the club and asked FIFA, the sport's governing body, to invalidate his contract. He also confirmed that, at one point during the season, he was threatened with a baseball bat by his former agent and a Galatasaray director. A day after announcing his move, Galatasaray officials and manager Eric Gerets blasted the player for betraying the club and also announced their intent to ask FIFA to probe the situation.

In July 2005, FIFA ruled in favour of Ribéry and dismissed Galatasaray's claims of the player being at fault. In response, the Turkish club announced their decision to challenge FIFA's ruling by appealing to the international Court of Arbitration for Sport. On 25 April 2007, their appeal was dismissed by the court, who declared in a statement that Ribéry had terminated his contract with the Turkish club at the end of the 2004–05 season on just grounds, and that Galatasaray was therefore not entitled to any compensation. Galatasaray had sought €10 million in compensation from Marseille.

==== 2005–06 season ====
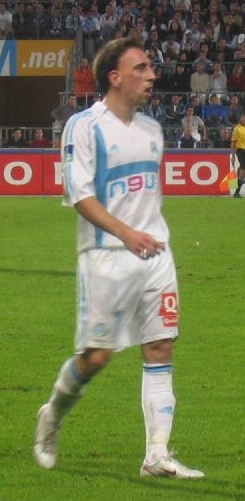
Ribéry playing for Marseille against Lille in October 2005

Upon his arrival, Ribéry was handed the number 7 shirt and made his debut on 30 July 2005 in a 2–0 defeat to Bordeaux collecting a yellow card. On 17 September, he scored his first goal for the club in their 2–1 victory over Troyes. Two weeks later, Ribéry netted goals in back-to-back matches in victories over his former club Metz and Nice. On 19 November, Ribéry scored the game-winning goal in a 2–1 win over Nantes. The goal, scored from almost 35 metres (1,400 in) out, was later voted the goal of the season by supporters.

In the Coupe de France, Ribéry performed well scoring a double against Le Havre and scoring the opening goal in Marseille's 3–1 semi-final victory over Rennes. The win pushed Marseille through to the 2006 final, where they faced Le Classique rivals Paris Saint-Germain, which merited Ribéry his second consecutive cup final appearance. Unfortunately, Marseille faltered losing 2–1 to the Parisian club. In Europe, Ribéry scored two goals in the UEFA Intertoto Cup against Italian club Lazio and Spanish outfit Deportivo de La Coruña. In the UEFA Cup, he scored one goal converting it in the second leg of Marseille's Round of 32 tie with Premier League club Bolton Wanderers. Ribéry was later named the National Union of Professional Footballers (UNFP) Young Player of the Year.

==== 2006–07 season ====
Following Ribéry's success internationally at the 2006 FIFA World Cup, a bidding war occurred in order to obtain his services with English club Arsenal initially offering €15 million for the player. However, Arsenal would be trumped by Spanish club Real Madrid, who offered €30 million for the Frenchman, according to Marseille directors. Rivals Olympique Lyonnais also sought Ribéry's services, with president Pape Diouf accusing Jean-Michel Aulas of tapping-up Ribéry after it was discovered that the Lyon chairman visited the France national team and Ribéry himself during the 2006 FIFA World Cup. Diouf later threatened to report Aulas to the Ligue de Football Professionnel (LFP) for his actions. He went as far as to accuse Ribéry's former agent, Bruno Heiderscheid, of badly advising the player. Marseille continued to declare him off-limits with nearly four years remaining on Ribéry's contract. On 11 August 2006, Ribéry confirmed his intention to remain with the club for the 2006–07 season.

Ribéry's now heightened popularity saw increased speculation from writers and supporters that Marseille would finally win their first league title since the 1991–92 season. He began the 2006–07 campaign on a high note, scoring in the club's second match of the season against Auxerre in a 3–0 victory. On 11 November 2006, Ribéry suffered a serious groin injury in Marseille's 1–0 loss to Lille. The resulting injury meant Ribéry was out for a number of weeks, returning following the winter break. On his return in January, Ribéry netted two goals in another win over Auxerre. The following month, Ribéry suffered a fractured foot in a match against Toulouse. The injury required him to miss four league matches, as well as a Coupe de France match. In April 2007, Ribéry finished the league season by scoring in back-to-back weeks against Sochaux in a 4–2 win and Monaco in another victory.

In the Coupe de France, Marseille again reached the final with Ribéry, for the second straight season, putting them there scoring the game-winning goal in a 3–0 semi-final win over Nantes. In the final, Marseille were heavy favourites over Sochaux, a team they had completely dominated just 12 days prior. However, Sochaux recorded an upset victory defeating Marseille 5–4 on penalties after the match ended 2–2 following extra time. Ribéry's final match with Marseille was a 1–0 win over Sedan on the final match day of the season. The victory secured second place for Marseille and was their best finish since finishing runner-up to Bordeaux during the 1998–99 season. Following the season, Ribéry was awarded the French Player of the Year by French sports publication France Football. The honour ended the four-year reign of Thierry Henry.

=== Bayern Munich ===
==== 2007–08 season ====
On 7 June 2007, German club Bayern Munich announced that they had reached an agreement with Marseille for the transfer of Ribéry, with the player agreeing to a four-year deal and Bayern paying Marseille a then club-record €25 million. Ribéry was given the number 7 shirt, which was freed up due to the retirement of midfielder Mehmet Scholl at the end of the previous season. He made his team debut one month later, scoring twice in an 18–0 friendly drubbing of Munich youth side FT Gern. Ribéry made his competitive debut for Bayern on 21 July 2007 against Werder Bremen in the first round of the Premiere Ligapokal, scoring twice and also assisting on another in a 4–1 victory. In the semifinals, he netted an early goal in a 2–0 win over defending champions VfB Stuttgart. Due to an injury, Ribéry was unable to play in the final, which Bayern won.

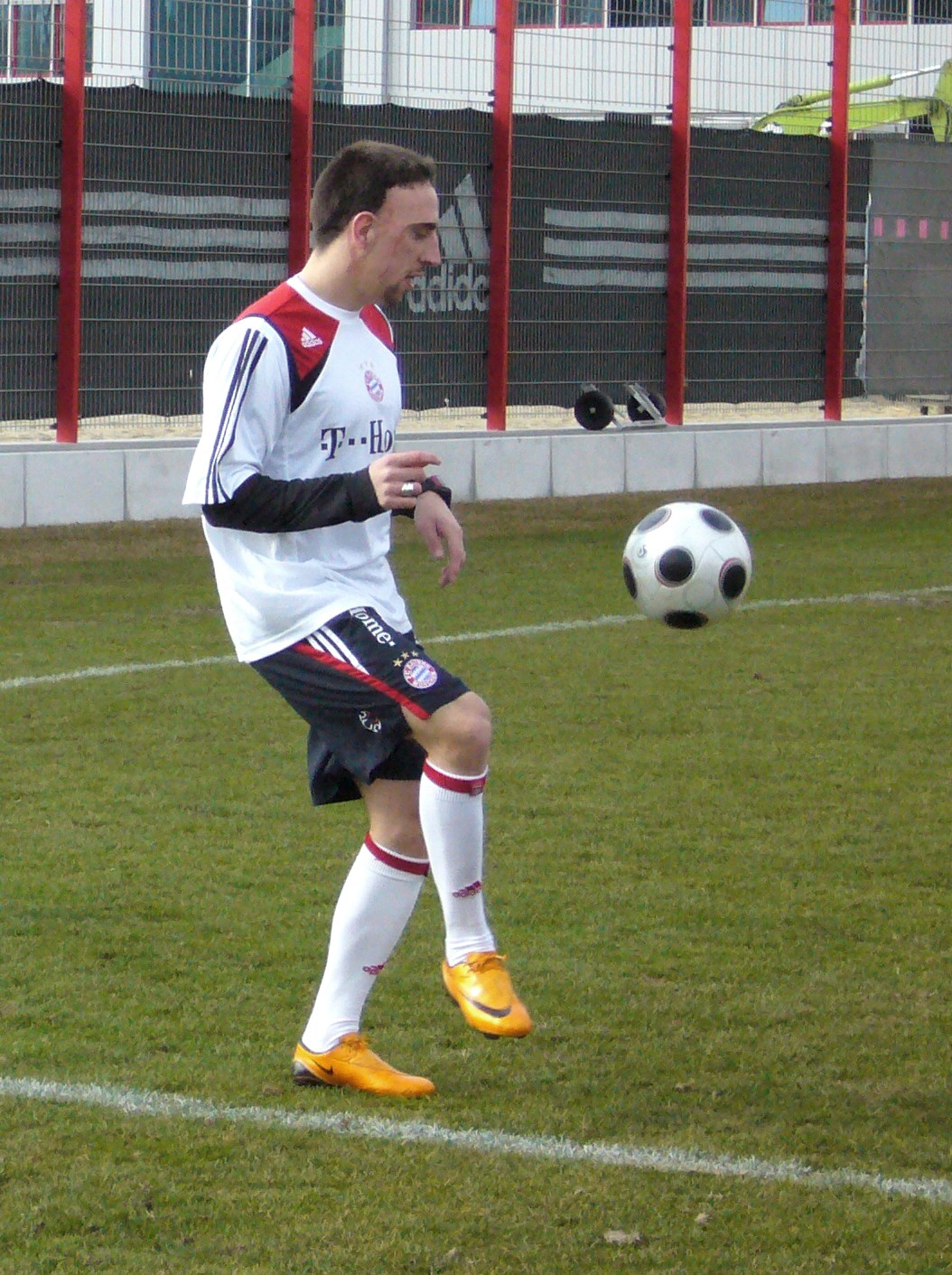
Ribéry playing keepie uppie at a training session with Bayern Munich in 2008

Ribéry scored his first league goal for the club on 18 August in a 4–0 triumph over Bremen converting a penalty in the 31st minute. He went scoreless in the league for almost two months before scoring a goal and providing the assist on Bayern's other goal in a 2–1 win over VfL Bochum. A month later, Ribéry recorded this feat again, providing the assist on the opening goal scored by Miroslav Klose and scoring the game winning goal in a 2–1 win over VfL Wolfsburg. In the German Cup, he recorded two goals and provided four assists in five matches Bayern contested. He netted his first goal in the competition on 27 February 2008 in Bayern's win over inner-city rivals 1860 Munich, with Ribéry converting the lone goal, a penalty, in the final minute of extra time. In the semi-finals, Ribéry scored the opening goal in Bayern's 2–0 win over Wolfsburg, which resulted in the club qualifying for the final against Borussia Dortmund. In the DFB-Pokal final, Ribéry assisted on Luca Toni's opener in the 11th minute in a match Bayern won 2–1, thus claiming their 14th cup title.

In the UEFA Cup, Bayern reached the semi-finals, with Ribéry scoring three goals in the competition, including one in the Germans' comeback win over Spanish club Getafe in the quarter-finals. In total, Ribéry appeared in 46 matches scoring 16 goals and assisting on 17 goals as Bayern won the league and cup double. For his efforts, on 8 June 2008, Ribéry was named the 2007–08 Footballer of the Year (Germany). He was also named French Player of the Year for the second consecutive season.

==== 2008–09 season ====
Due to tearing ligaments in his ankle at Euro 2008, Ribéry began the season with Bayern on 24 September 2008 in a DFB-Pokal match against 1. FC Nürnberg, appearing as a substitute in the 65th minute. He made his league debut three days later and, after a month of play, scored his first goal of the season in Bayern's 4–2 comeback win over VfL Wolfsburg. Following the match, Ribéry scored in five-straight league matches, with the club going undefeated in that span. On 10 December, Ribéry capped the 2008 portion of the season by scoring a goal and providing assists on the other two in Bayern's 3–2 victory over Lyon in the Champions League. For his performances throughout 2008, Ribéry finished third behind Cristiano Ronaldo and Lionel Messi for the Onze d'Or. He was shortlisted by the French magazine France Football for the 2008 Ballon d'Or award, won by Cristiano Ronaldo.

Ribéry's 2009 debut saw Bayern earn a 5–1 German Cup win over VfB Stuttgart, with the player scoring and also providing an assist. On 24 February 2009, he scored a double in the club's 5–0 win over Sporting CP in the first leg of their Round of 16 clash. Bayern were later eliminated 5–1 on aggregate by Spanish champions Barcelona in the next round, with Ribéry scoring a consolation goal in the second leg in a 1–1 draw at the Allianz. In the league, Bayern failed to defend their Bundesliga title, despite suffering defeat only twice in their final 13 matches, losing out to Wolfsburg. Ribéry ended the season with 36 total appearances and 14 goals.

==== 2009–10 season ====
I hope he stays. For me, he’s up there with Lionel Messi and Cristiano Ronaldo as one of the best players in the world.

— Former Bayern Munich player and president Franz Beckenbauer, on Ribéry's future with the club.

Following the 2008–09 season, constant speculation began to surface regarding Ribéry's availability on the transfer market. Despite Bayern president Uli Hoeneß, executive Karl-Heinz Rummenigge and new manager Louis van Gaal declaring that Ribéry would not be sold, numerous media outlets declared that English clubs Chelsea and Manchester United, Spanish clubs Barcelona and Real Madrid, and Italian outfit Inter Milan had strong interest in the player, with many of the clubs willing to offer as much as €65 million for his services. In order to quell the interest, Hoeneß declared that Ribéry would leave for nothing less than €100 million.

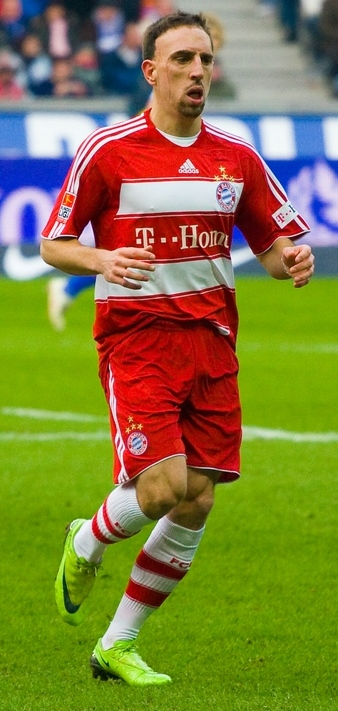
Ribéry playing for Bayern in 2009

Ribéry began the 2009–10 season struggling with tendonitis in his left knee, but was healthy enough to start the season scoring his first goal in a 5–1 victory against rivals Borussia Dortmund, converting a free kick. The goal was notable in part due to Ribéry's celebration afterward; following his conversion, Ribéry ran across the field eluding several celebratory teammates and enthusiastically jumped into his manager Louis van Gaal's awaiting arms. The mutual show of admiration ended speculation by the media of the two having a poor relationship. In early October, the tendinitis began to affect his play, which resulted in Ribéry missing the rest of the year, as well as France's World Cup playoff tie with the Republic of Ireland.

On 23 January 2010, Ribéry returned to the team, making an appearance as a substitute in the club's 3–2 league win over Werder Bremen. Ribéry's first goal of the new year came on 10 February scoring in Bayern's 6–2 DFB-Pokal victory over SpVgg Greuther Fürth. On 31 March, he scored the equalising goal in Bayern's 2–1 first leg win over English club Manchester United in the Champions League quarter-finals after converting a free kick, which deflected off of striker Wayne Rooney before going into the net. In the club's ensuing match, Ribéry scored the opening goal in the team's 2–1 victory over Schalke 04.

On 20 April, Ribéry was sent off by referee Roberto Rosetti in the club's first leg Champions League semi-final against Lyon after being adjudged to have committed serious foul play on Lyon striker Lisandro López. The expulsion resulted in Ribéry missing the second leg in Lyon, which Bayern won to advance to the UEFA Champions League final. On 28 April, Ribéry was handed a three-match suspension by UEFA's Control and Disciplinary Body for assault. The suspension meant that Ribéry would miss the final. Following the ruling, Bayern Munich announced their intent to appeal the suspension. On 5 May, the club's appeal was heard by the UEFA Appeals Body, which upheld Ribéry's ban meaning he would not only miss the final on 22 May, but also the next UEFA club competition fixture for which he is eligible. Immediately after the ruling, however, Bayern responded by announcing their intention of appealing to the Court of Arbitration for Sport.

On 15 May, Ribéry scored the third goal in Bayern's 4–0 win over Werder Bremen in the 2009–10 edition of the DFB-Pokal final. Two days later, Ribéry's appeal was heard by the Court of Arbitration for Sport and was dismissed meaning he was officially ruled out of the UEFA Champions League final against Inter Milan on 22 May. Bayern Munich lost the match 2–0. On 20 May, it was announced by German newspaper Bild that Ribéry had agreed to a new five-year contract with Bayern Munich and would sign the contract upon his arrival in Madrid to watch his teammates contest the Champions League final. On 23 May, the day after the final, the club officially confirmed the agreement. The new deal tied Ribéry to the club until 2015 and, though there is uncertainty regarding the annual salary, it has been speculated that the new deal pays him an annual salary of €10 million a year, the highest annual salary ever awarded to a player in the club's history.

==== 2010–11 season ====
Ribéry began the 2010–11 season healthy for the first time since his debut season with the club. He was among the first World Cup players to arrive to pre-season training and made his season debut on 16 August 2010 in Bayern's 4–0 victory over Germania Windeck in the first round of the DFB-Pokal. In the match, Ribéry scored his first goal of the season. Four days later, he assisted on the game-winning goal, scored by Bastian Schweinsteiger, in the team's opening league match against VfL Wolfsburg. On 21 September, Ribéry was forced to leave the team's 2–1 win over 1899 Hoffenheim after suffering an ankle injury. The injury was discovered to be serious and Ribéry was ruled out for four weeks.

Despite the initial diagnosis, Ribéry missed two months and returned to the team on 14 November in a league match against 1. FC Nürnberg. A week later, Ribéry was criticised by manager Louis van Gaal for his performance in a friendly match against SpVgg Unterhaching, which was organised to help Ribéry and other injured first-team players regain full fitness. Though Van Gaal was disappointed in several of his players' performances, he singled out Ribéry, stating, "he [Ribéry] didn't make any effort and showed no commitment." Ribéry did, however, remain in contention to appear in the team's next league match against Bayer Leverkusen. He subsequently appeared in the match as a substitute in the 61st minute. On 8 December, Ribéry scored a double in a 3–0 victory over Swiss club Basel in the Champions League.

On 15 January, in Bayern's first league match following the winter break against Wolfsburg, Ribéry suffered a lower leg injury in the first half as a result of a tackle by Brazilian midfielder Josué. Initial media reports described the injury as serious with Ribéry possibly having to undergo surgery to repair torn ligaments. After further medical analysis, however, the injury was only reduced to a sprain and Ribéry subsequently missed two weeks. He returned to the team on 5 February in a league match against 1. FC Köln. On 12 February, Ribéry assisted on two goals in a 4–0 win over 1899 Hoffenheim.

Following the team's 3–1 league win over Mainz 05 on 19 February, Ribéry embarked on a streak in which he charted a statistical output in Bayern's next five league matches. On 26 February, he assisted on the team's only goal in its 3–1 defeat against rivals Borussia Dortmund. In the next match, against Hannover 96, he repeated his feat from the previous match assisted on an Arjen Robben goal in another defeat. On 12 March, Ribéry had arguably his best performance of the season after scoring a goal and providing three assists in a 6–0 hammering of Hamburger SV. In Bayern's following match against SC Freiburg, he assisted on the team's opening goal, scored by Mario Gómez, and then netted the game-winning goal two minutes from time in a 2–1 win. Against Borussia Mönchengladbach on 2 April, Ribéry assisted on the only goal of the match, which was converted by Robben. The streak ended in the team's 1–1 draw with 1. FC Nürnberg on 11 April. Six days later, Ribéry scored the final goal in a 5–1 sweeping of Bayer Leverkusen.

==== 2011–12 season ====
Prior to the start of the 2011–12 season, Ribéry suffered an ankle injury during a pre-season training session, which resulted in the player being carried from the training ground by members of the club's medical team. Despite the player himself fearing he may have torn ligaments in the ankle, after an examination, club doctors revealed that the injury was not as serious as first thought, and Ribéry missed only one competitive match, a 3–0 DFB-Pokal away win over Eintracht Braunschweig on 1 August 2011. Ribéry made his season debut a week later in Bayern's opening league match of the season, playing the entire match in a 1–0 loss to Borussia Mönchengladbach. In the following week, he assisted on the game-winning goal, scored by Luiz Gustavo, in a win over VfL Wolfsburg. Ribéry scored his first goal of the campaign in the team's next league match against Hamburger SV. Bayern won the match 5–0. Following the international break, on 10 September, he scored a double and assisted on a goal in a 7–0 home victory over SC Freiburg. A week later, Ribéry assisted on both team goals in a shutout win over Schalke 04.

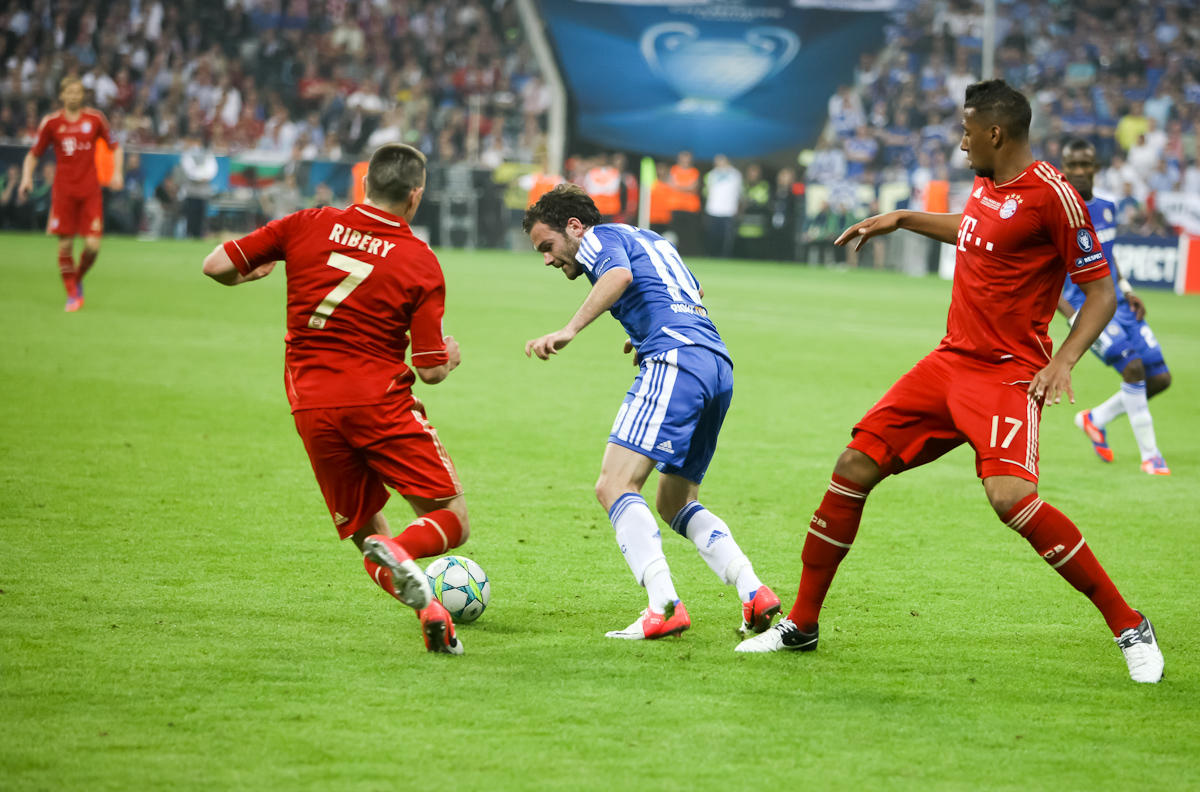
Juan Mata (in blue) taking on Ribéry in the 2012 UEFA Champions League Final

Following the October international break, Ribéry manufactured another statistical output after scoring and assisting on two goals in a 4–0 win over Hertha BSC. On 29 October, he scored the game-winning goal in a 2–1 win over FC Augsburg. In the UEFA Champions League, Ribéry scored his first goal in the competition on 22 November against Spanish club Villarreal in the group stage. He scored one goal in each half to give Bayern a 3–1 win, which allowed the club progression to the UEFA Champions League knockout phase. On 3 December, Ribéry scored another set of goals in a 4–1 win against Werder Bremen. The league win re-inserted Bayern back into first-place position in the league after momentarily losing the spot in late November. After failing to score a goal in two months, on 8 February 2012 Ribéry scored the game-winning goal in a 2–0 win over VfB Stuttgart in the quarter-finals of the DFB-Pokal. The goal resulted in Ribéry scoring in every official competition Bayern Munich has participated in since he joined the club in 2007.

On 26 February, Ribéry scored two goals in a shutout win over Schalke 04. Two weeks later, in a 7–1 thrashing of 1899 Hoffenheim, he scored another goal and assisted on goals scored by Toni Kroos, Arjen Robben and Mario Gómez. In the semi-finals of the DFB-Pokal, Ribéry scored the second goal in the team's 4–2 extra time win over Borussia Mönchengladbach. The win took Bayern Munich to its 18th German Cup final. On 17 April, Ribéry scored Bayern's opening goal in its 2–1 first leg victory over Spanish club Real Madrid in the semi-finals of the Champions League. Two days after the match, it was reported by German publication Sport Bild that Ribéry was involved in a dressing room fight during half-time of the Madrid match with Arjen Robben. The report stated that "a clear-the-air meeting was held" and Ribéry was "said to have apologized and accepted a fine for his actions". In the team's ensuing match against Werder Bremen, Ribéry appeared as a substitute and scored the game-winning goal in the 90th minute. On 12 May 2012, Ribéry scored in the 2012 DFB-Pokal Final, as Bayern lost 5–2 against rivals Borussia Dortmund. In extra time of the 2012 UEFA Champions League Final, he was subbed out after sustaining an injury from a tackle by Didier Drogba. Bayern eventually lost in a penalty shootout.

==== 2012–13 season ====
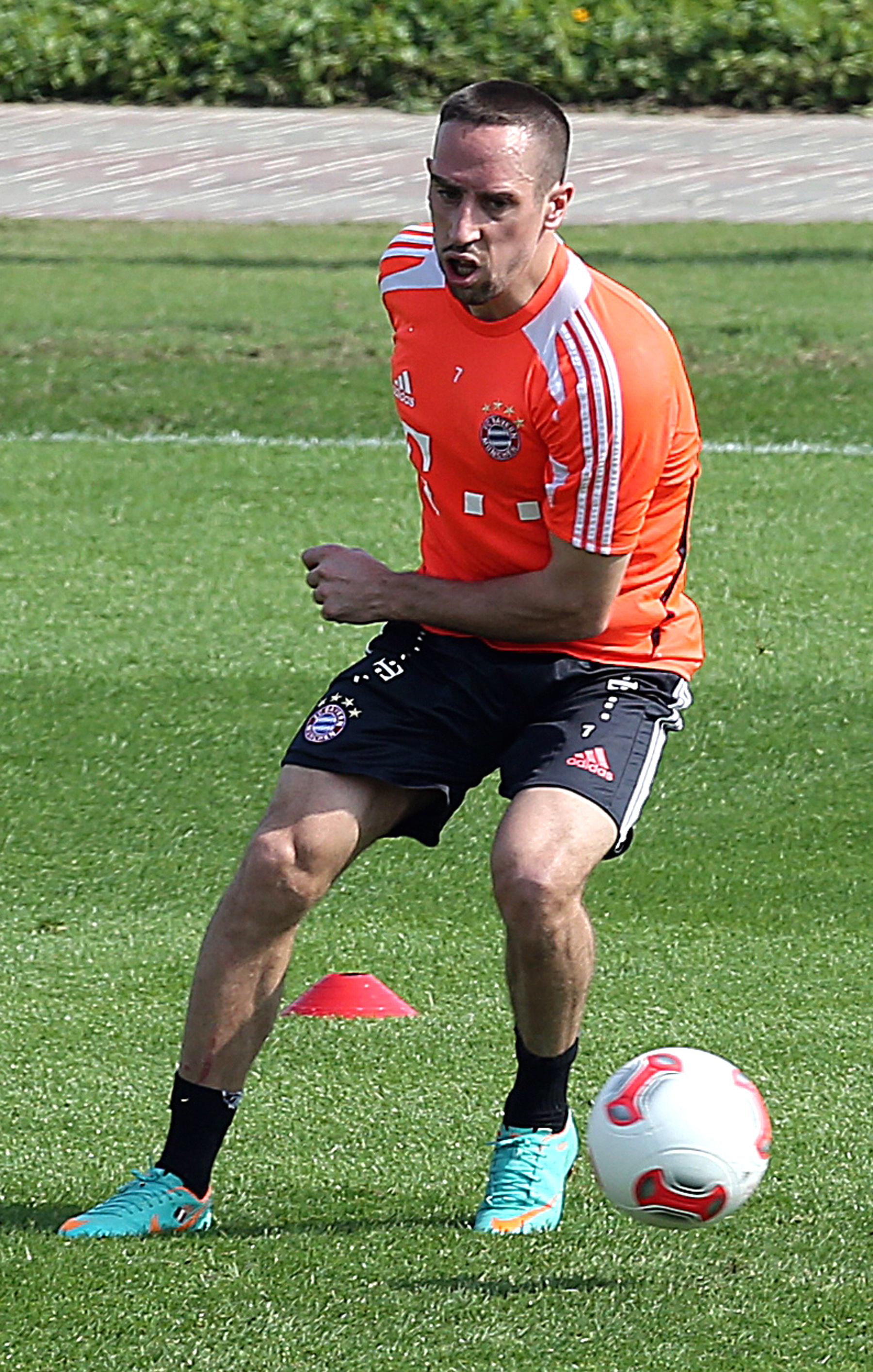
Ribéry training with Bayern in January 2013

Ribéry started the 2012–13 season by winning the 2012 DFL-Supercup against Borussia Dortmund on 12 August 2012. He scored two goals in a 2–0 victory over Hoffenheim on 6 October. Ribery scored a late minute goal against BATE Borisov in the Champions League, but the match ended a 3–1 loss for Bayern. On 20 October, Ribery provided hat-trick of assists in a 5–0 win over Fortuna Düsseldorf. On 18 December, Ribéry was shown a straight red card after slapping Augsburg's midfielder Koo Ja-cheol during the DFB Pokal round of 16 match, but that did not stop his side from winning the match 2–0. He was given two-match suspension in the Pokal causing him to miss the quarter-final match against Borussia Dortmund and the semi-final match against VFL Wolfsburg even though his side won both of the matches and made it through to the final.

Ribéry also won the Champions League with Bayern Munich in an all-German final against Dortmund. He provided the assist to Arjen Robben who then scored the match-winning goal in the Champions League final. He completed the continental treble with Bayern after also winning the 2012–13 Bundesliga and 2013 DFB-Pokal against VfB Stuttgart. Ribéry also had the most assists with 15 assists in the Bundesliga.

==== 2013–14 season ====
On 10 August 2013, Ribéry provided one assist to his teammate Arjen Robben in their first Bundesliga game of the season as they won the game with a 3–1 victory over Borussia Mönchengladbach. Ribéry scored his first header in a 2–0 victory over 1. FC Nürnberg on 24 August. On 29 August, Ribéry won the UEFA Best Player in Europe Award. On 30 August, Ribéry scored a 47th-minute goal against Chelsea in the 2013 UEFA Super Cup as his side won the UEFA Super Cup title for the first time in their club's history after winning in the penalty shoot-out.

On 21 December, Ribéry was awarded the Golden Ball for being the best player of the tournament after his side won the FIFA Club World Cup title for the first time in club's history by beating Raja Casablanca 2–0 victory in the final. On 13 January 2014, he placed third in the 2013 FIFA Ballon d'Or, behind Cristiano Ronaldo and Lionel Messi. He was also ranked fourth in The Guardian's list of the best players in the world. On 7 February, Ribéry suffered burst blood vessel in his buttock which kept him out of the pitch for two weeks. On 25 March, he scored in a 3–1 win over Hertha BSC as Bayern were confirmed as Bundesliga champions.

==== 2014–15 season ====
On 18 October 2014, Ribéry made his return after suffering from a knee injury as a substitute in the 61st minute in a 6–0 home victory over Werder Bremen. Ribéry scored each goal in both the matches against A.S. Roma in the UEFA Champions League group stage, Bayern won 7–1 in the first match and 2–0 in the second match. He made an impressive performance and scored a goal in his first start for the club since April 2014 in a 3–1 victory over Hamburger SV in the DFB-Pokal on 30 October. Ribéry scored his 100th goal for Bayern and the only goal of the match in 1–0 victory over Bayer Leverkusen on 6 December. The goal happened in his 287th competitive match for Bayern. In January 2015, he suffered another injury which was muscle injury in training and missed only three matches against VfL Wolfsburg, Schalke 04 and VfB Stuttgart. On 27 March, Ribéry then suffered an ankle injury in a 7–0 home victory over Shakhtar Donetsk in the UEFA Champions League 2nd leg match of the Round of 16 tie and was sidelined for the remaining of the season. He scored nine goals and provided seven assists in this season.

==== 2015–16 season ====
On 2 December 2015, Ribéry trained with the first team for the first time since his injury in March 2015. On 5 December, he made his first appearance since his ankle injury as a substitute coming in for Robert Lewandowski and also scored a goal after six minutes of his appearance, but that didn't stop Bayern from losing 3–1 to Borussia Mönchengladbach. It was also his 300th competitive appearance for Bayern Munich. He made his 200th Bundesliga appearance in a 1–0 win over 1. FC Köln on 19 March 2016. On 2 April, Ribéry scored a bicycle kick goal for Bayern Munich to beat Eintracht Frankfurt with a 1–0 victory. He finished the season with two goals and three assists.

==== 2016–17 season ====
Ribéry extended his contract with Bayern Munich by another year to June 2018, on 27 November 2016. On 17 September, Ribéry was involved in all Bayern's goal as he provided three assists to Robert Lewandowski, Xabi Alonso and Rafinha's goals to beat FC Ingolstadt 04 with a 3–1 victory. In the middle of the season, he suffered a thigh injury which kept him out from the pitch for almost four weeks. He made his comeback in a 3–0 DFB-Pokal quarter-final victory over Schalke 04 on 2 March 2017. Ribéry scored five goals and provided seventeen assists in this season.

==== 2017–18 season ====
Ribéry started the season by winning the DFL-Supercup as Bayern defeated their arch-rival Borussia Dortmund 5–4 on penalties. On 1 October 2017, he sustained a knee injury in a 2–2 draw to Hertha BSC. On 2 December, Ribéry made his return to the pitch in a 3–1 victory over Hannover 96 and made a record for Bayern Munich's most Bundesliga appearances by a non-German with 235th appearance, overtaking former Bayern player and current sporting director Hasan Salihamidžić who had 234 appearances. He made another record of most competitive appearances by any non-German player for Bayern with 366 appearances in a 1–0 victory over 1. FC Köln, surpassing Hasan Salihamidžić's 365 appearances. Ribéry scored twice in a 6–0 home victory over Hamburger SV on 10 March 2018. On 7 May 2018, Ribéry again extended his contract with Bayern, until June 2019. He ended the season with six goals and five assists.

==== 2018–19 season ====
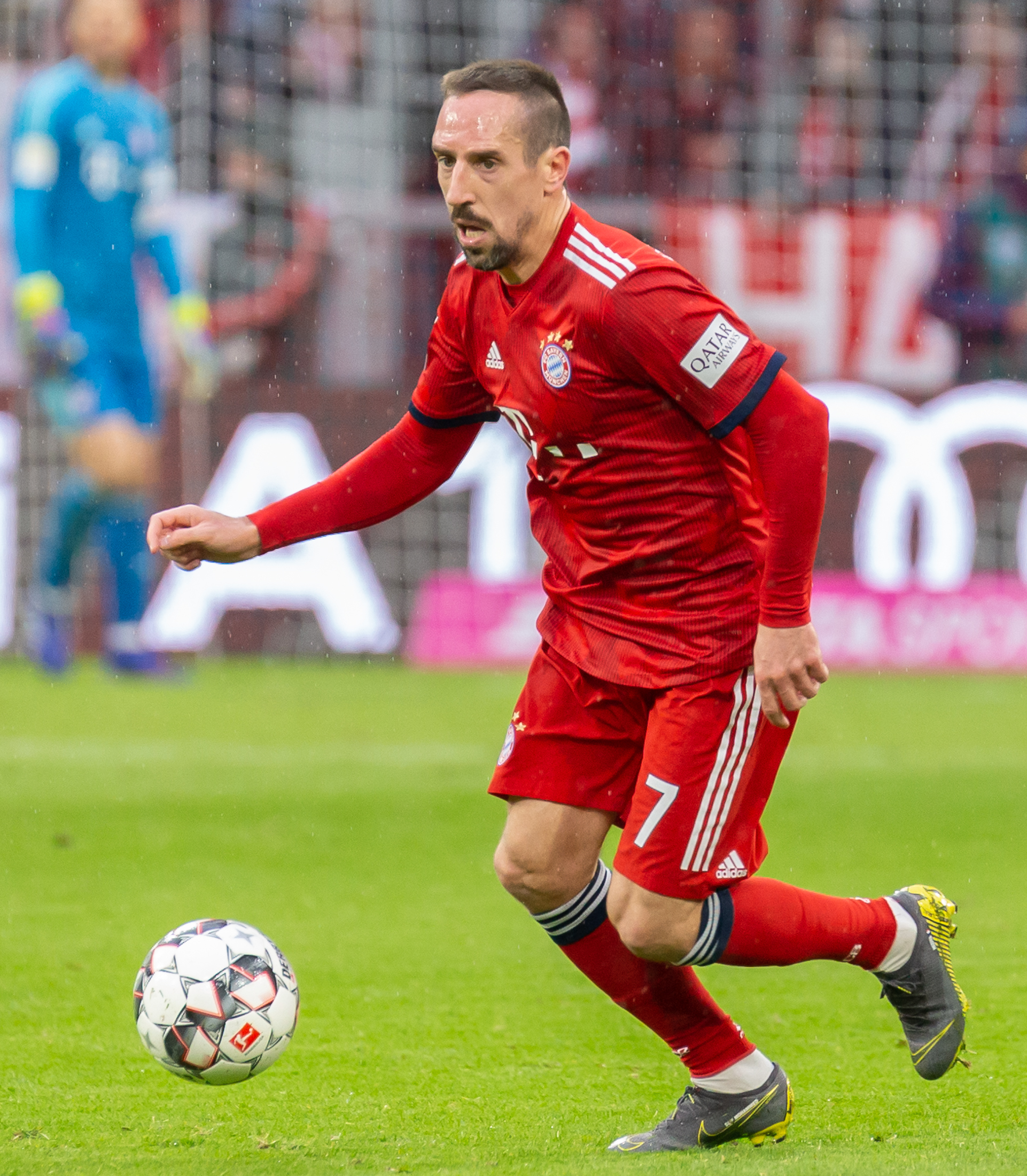
Ribéry playing for Bayern in 2019

Ribéry played his first competitive match of the season and won the DFL-Supercup as Bayern defeated Eintracht Frankfurt with a 5–0 victory. On 1 September, Ribéry made his 250th Bundesliga appearance in a 3–0 victory over VfB Stuttgart. On 27 November, Ribéry scored his first goal of the season in a 5–1 win against Benfica in the Champions League.

On 5 May 2019, Bayern Munich announced that Ribéry would be leaving the club at the end of the season, with a testimonial match set for 2020. On 18 May 2019, Ribéry won his ninth Bundesliga title with Bayern. With his ninth Bundesliga title, Ribéry became Bundesliga's all-time record champion (since surpassed by David Alaba and Thomas Müller). On 25 May 2019, Ribéry won his sixth DFB-Pokal as Bayern defeated RB Leipzig 3–0 in the 2019 DFB-Pokal Final. Ribéry came on as a substitute in the 87th minute and made history as this was his eighth DFB-Pokal final appearance. No other player has played in as many DFB-Pokal finals. Ribéry finished his career at Bayern with a club record 24 titles.

=== Fiorentina ===
In August 2019, Ribéry signed with Italian side Fiorentina on a free transfer. He made his debut for the club on 24 August, coming on as a late substitute in a 4–3 home loss to Napoli in the opening game of the 2019–20 Serie A season. He scored his first goal for the club in a 2–2 away draw against Atalanta on 22 September. In October 2019, he received a three-match ban after pushing a match official.

=== Salernitana ===
On 6 September 2021, Ribéry signed for Salernitana, agreeing on a one-year contract with an automatical renewal in case the club succeeded in keeping its Serie A status by the end of the season. Appointed as team captain, Ribéry played only 23 league games due to recurring injuries.

As Salernitana escaped relegation by the final day of the season, Ribéry's contract was automatically extended by one more year. In the following 2022–23 season, Ribéry only managed to play 36 minutes in a game against Roma as he regularly struggled with a recurring knee injury, thus leading to rumours regarding his possible immediate retirement.

On 20 October 2022, Ribéry terminated his contract with Salernitana and announced his retirement.

== International career ==
Prior to representing the senior team, Ribéry was ever present with the France under-21 team earning his first selection on 3 September 2004 in a 1–0 victory over Israel in qualifying for the 2006 UEFA European Under-21 Football Championship. Ribéry scored his first under-21 goal five days later in a 1–0 friendly win over Slovakia. On 15 November 2005, he scored an important goal against England during the qualification playoffs as France defeated them 3–2 on aggregate to advance to the finals. Ribéry, however, missed the competition after earning selection to coach Raymond Domenech's pre-World Cup squad. In total with the under-21s, Ribéry made 13 appearances scoring two goals.

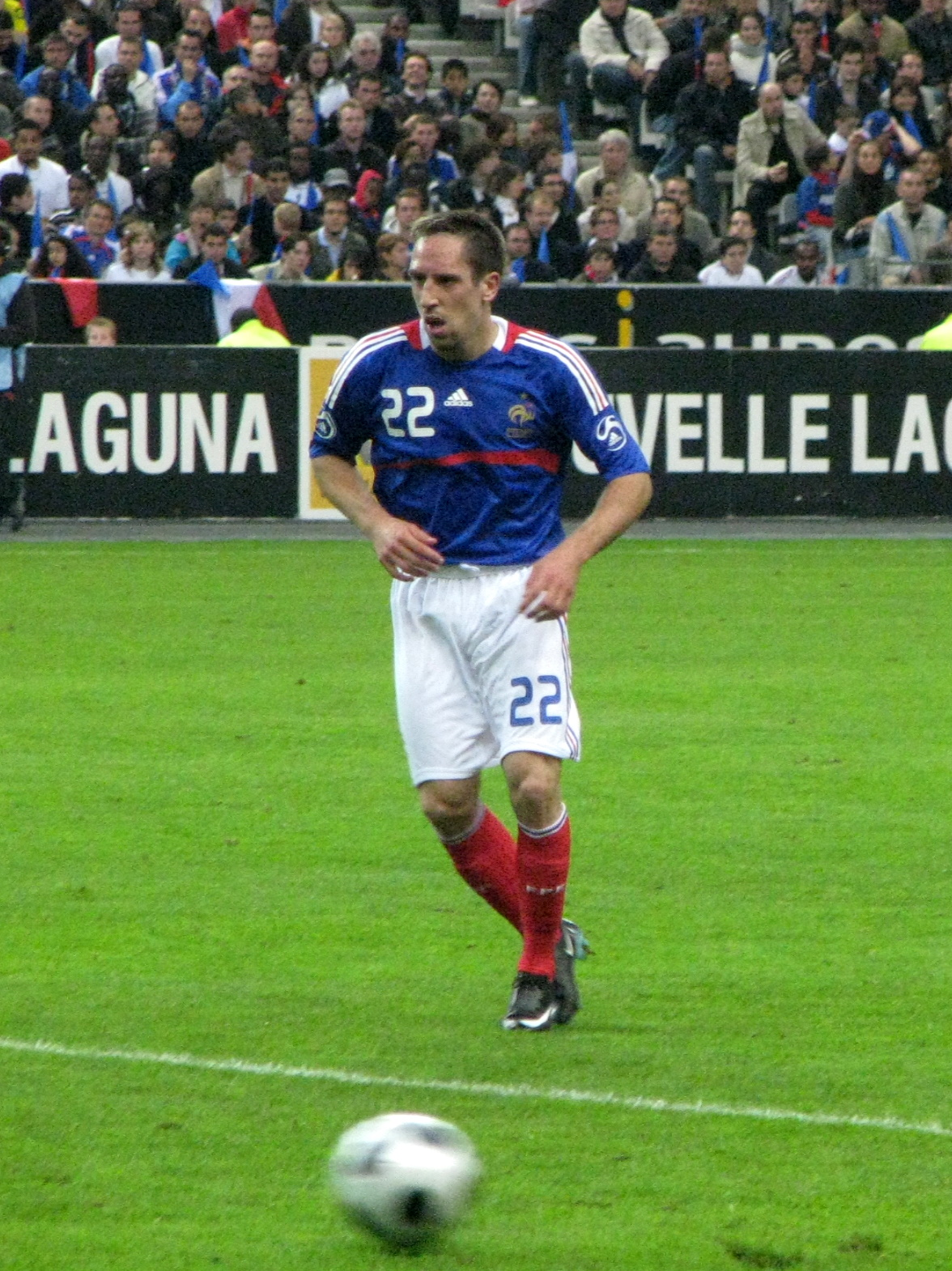
Ribéry playing for France against Colombia in June 2008

Ribéry earned his first cap with the senior team in a 1–0 victory over Mexico on 27 May 2006 appearing as a substitute in the 74th minute for striker David Trezeguet. His solid performances in the friendly matches ahead of the 2006 FIFA World Cup led to his inclusion in the team for the competition. Ribéry appeared in all seven matches France contested, starting six. On 27 June, he scored France's opening goal in the team's 3–1 Round of 16 win over Spain after receiving a through ball from Patrick Vieira, which allowed the winger to dribble past an oncoming Iker Casillas and shoot into the empty net. He played in the final where France lost to Italy on penalties. Ribéry's only shot on goal came in extra time and he was later replaced by Trezeguet.

Following the retirement of Zinedine Zidane, it was expected that Ribéry would succeed him and become the national team's talisman. He went scoreless for almost a year and a half before converting a penalty shot against England on 26 March 2008 at the Stade de France. Following the goal, Ribéry paid tribute to legendary French commentator Thierry Gilardi, who had died a day earlier. At Euro 2008, France performed below expectations, with Ribéry appearing in all three group stage matches as France suffered early elimination. On 17 June 2008, in the team's final group stage match against Italy, Ribéry ruptured a ligament in his left ankle in just the 8th minute of play. Ribéry returned to the team on 11 October 2008 in a FIFA World Cup qualification match against Romania, scoring the team's opening goal in a 2–2 draw. On 28 March 2009, Ribéry scored the only goal away to Lithuania. Three days later, he completed this feat again, this time at the Stade de France, netting the winner in the 75th minute following an assist from André-Pierre Gignac.

It's clear I had a horrible 2010 from all points of view. I won't even speak of the injuries that troubled me. But in my private life, my behaviour as a footballer, I went down the wrong roads, I lost myself. I hurt people, people who are very dear to me. I disappointed and even shocked many people and I want to apologise.

— Ribéry commenting on what occurred during the 2010 calendar year.

On 11 May 2010, Ribéry was named to Domenech's 30-man preliminary squad to participate in the 2010 World Cup and his second World Cup overall. He was later named to the 23-man team to compete in the competition. Ribéry appeared in all three group stage matches. Following the team's opening match against Uruguay, Ribéry was criticised for his performance by former international Just Fontaine, who questioned Ribéry's leadership ability. It was later reported by the media that Ribéry and striker Nicolas Anelka purposely "froze-out" midfielder Yoann Gourcuff. Anelka was later dismissed from the team after reportedly having a dispute in which obscenities were passed, with Domenech during half-time of the team's 2–0 loss to Mexico.

On 20 June, an emotional Ribéry appeared alongside Domenech on TF1's football show Téléfoot to dispel rumours associated with the team and to also apologise to supporters for the national team's performance over the past two years, stating, "We [France] are suffering at the moment," and, "I would like to say sorry to the whole country." The following day, the team boycotted a training session in response to Anelka's expulsion and, on 21 June, returned to training without incident. In the team's final group stage match against the hosts South Africa, Ribéry assisted on the team's only goal of the competition, scored by Florent Malouda. France, however, lost the match 2–1, which resulted in the team's elimination from the competition. On 6 August, Ribéry was one of five players summoned to attend a hearing held by the Disciplinary Committee of the French Football Federation (FFF) in response to the team's strike held at the World Cup. On 17 August, he received a three-match international ban for his part in the incident. Ribéry did not attend the hearing due to his parent club's objection.

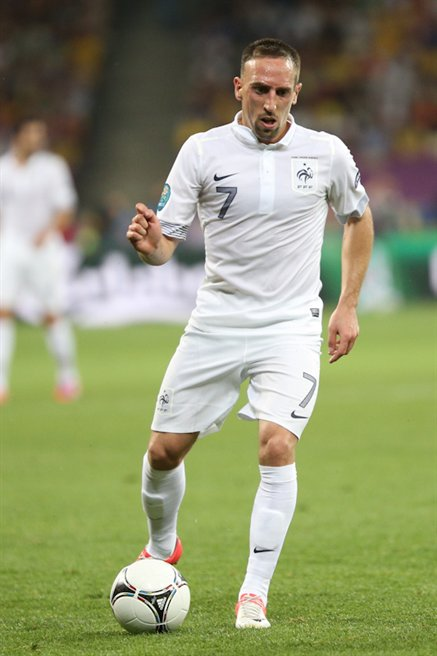
Ribéry playing for France at UEFA Euro 2012

On 17 March 2011, Ribéry was called up to the national team by new manager Laurent Blanc for the first time since the 2010 World Cup. He had been eligible to return to the team since October 2010 after serving his three-match suspension, but due to injuries, Ribéry missed three call-ups. On 21 March, after arriving to Clairefontaine ahead of the team's matches against Luxembourg and Croatia, Ribéry attended a personal press conference in which he apologised for his behaviour overall during the 2010 calendar year. He made his return to the team on 25 March in the team's match against Luxembourg and responded by assisting on the team's second goal, scored by Yoann Gourcuff, in its 2–0 win. In his first match at the Stade de France since his participation at the World Cup, against Croatia, Ribéry appeared as a substitute and was subject to jeers from some section of supporters, though other parts of the stadium chanted his name.

After appearing regularly in qualifying for UEFA Euro 2012, on 29 May 2012, Ribéry was named to the squad to participate in the competition. Two days prior, he scored his first goal for France in over three years in a 3–2 friendly comeback win over Iceland. On 31 May, Ribéry scored the game-winning goal in a 2–0 win against Serbia. Four days later, he capped off the trio of lead-in friendly matches ahead of the European Championship by scoring the opening goal in a 4–0 shutout win over Estonia.

Ribéry was included in France's squad for the 2014 FIFA World Cup, but on 6 June, coach Didier Deschamps confirmed that he would miss the tournament through injury. Shortly afterwards, in August 2014 Ribéry retired from international football. He cited the reasons for his retirement as "purely personal".

== Player profile ==
=== Style of play ===
Ribéry primarily played as a winger and was described as a player who was "fast, tricky, and an excellent dribbler who had great control with the ball at his feet". Despite being predominantly right-footed and utilised as a right-sided midfielder during his development years in France, since establishing himself as an international and at Bayern Munich, Ribéry personally admitted that his preference was to play on the left wing, even going as far as to state, "My place is on the left" when asked at a February 2010 media session while on international duty. Although he was often played on the left wing domestically, Ribéry struggled to establish himself as a left winger at the international level with France due to the presence of left-footed dominant players such as Florent Malouda. Ribéry declared that he was best utilised on the left side because "that is where I am most free and I am the best in my head". Playing on the left also allowed Ribéry to use his "bursts of acceleration and weaving runs" to effectively cut inside, which allowed him to take on opponents, exploit spaces, and give him the options of either shooting on goal with his stronger foot or delivering a decisive pass.

Ribéry was also capable of playing in the centre of the field as an attacking midfielder, where his vision, precise passing, technique, and playmaking skills were best exhibited; he was also deployed as a central midfielder on occasion. Despite predominantly playing on the wing, Ribéry was known to be an excellent assist provider: during his twelve seasons with Bayern Munich, he amassed 124 assists in the Bundesliga; moreover, he averaged double-digits in assists every year beginning with his final season at Marseille. In addition to his skills, eye for goal, and playing ability, he also drew praise in the media over his defensive work rate, tenacity, mentality, and energetic playing style.

=== Personality ===
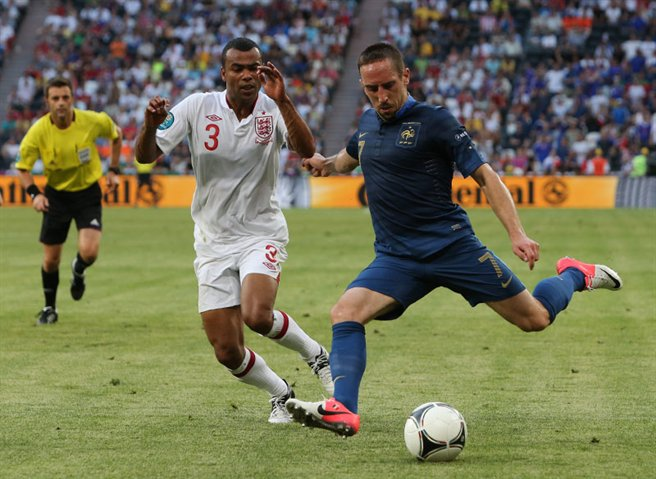
Ribéry taking on Ashley Cole of England at UEFA Euro 2012

Ribéry was described as a provocateur on the field of play, with UEFA referring to him as "a crowd-pleaser – one of those rare breed of footballer capable of enjoying his talents while expressing them", due to his trickery, artistry, and creativity on the ball. During the 2006 World Cup, he was mentored by national team playmaker Zinedine Zidane. While boasting him as "the jewel of French football", Zidane also praised Ribéry as a person, declaring, "Franck just loves life. He's the kind of player that makes an impression every time he plays. He’s bound to become an important figure in the world of football."

Ribéry's on-field personality was often matched off-field as he was often referred to as a "joker" and "prankster" by club and international teammates. The midfielder has stated that humour is very important, admitting, "It's important to always be smiling, to wake up and feel good. We (footballers) have a great job, we like what we do and we have fun." His more notable stunts include driving a tractor on field during one of his last matches with Marseille; in his debut season with Bayern, emptying a bucket of water over former club goalkeeper Oliver Kahn from the roof of the club's training centre; and, during the 2008–09 winter break, commandeering the team bus while in Dubai and crashing it.

=== Injuries ===
Ribéry, however, also struggled with injuries throughout his career. Since his first season at Bayern in which he appeared in 46 of the club's 54 competitive matches, Ribéry struggled with minor and serious injuries that resulted in the player failing to appear in over 40 matches in subsequent seasons; the midfielder passed the 40-match barrier in the 2011–12 season after failing to in the previous three campaigns. Ahead of the 2008–09 season, he tore ligaments in one of his ankles while on international duty and, during the 2009–10 season, struggled with tendinitis in his left knee. In the next season, Ribéry suffered an ankle injury, which resulted in the midfielder missing two months, despite the initial diagnosis ruling him out for four weeks. He later suffered a similar ankle injury at the start of the 2011–12 season. Ribéry, himself, has admitted that injuries led to most of his five-year career at Bayern being difficult, stating in July 2011, "The last two years (2009–10 and 2010–11 seasons) have been more difficult, partly because I kept picking up injuries. The important thing for me now is to avoid any more injuries".

== Coaching career ==
In October 2022, just after his retirement as an active footballer, Ribéry agreed to stay at Salernitana as a technical collaborator to head coach Davide Nicola. He was confirmed on his role also under new head coach Paulo Sousa. In October 2023, Ribéry obtained a UEFA B coaching licence.

== Outside football ==
Since establishing himself as an international, Ribéry has been involved in numerous promotional campaigns. He is sponsored by American sportswear company Nike and regularly wears Nike Mercurial Vapors. He appeared in several television advertisements for Nike and, during the 2007–08 Bundesliga season, starred in a one-off television show called The Franck Ribéry Show, which aired on Direct 8 in France. The show, sponsored by Nike, acted as a variety show with Ribéry appearing in several sketches. Ribéry features in EA Sports' FIFA video game series. For the 2008–09 season, he appeared on the French cover of FIFA 09 alongside international teammate Karim Benzema, and was the ninth-highest rated player in FIFA 15.

On 25 May 2010, a 27 by 30 metres (89 ft × 98 ft) billboard of Ribéry was officially unveiled in his home city of Boulogne-sur-Mer ahead of the 2010 World Cup. The billboard paid tribute to a similar billboard that was erected for Zinedine Zidane in his home city of Marseille during his career. The construction of the billboard was initially suspended due to possible image ramifications associated with Ribéry's alleged relationship with an underage prostitute.

However, the Regional Council of the Nord-Pas-de-Calais region, which initially opposed the billboard, agreed to allow construction of the billboard. The billboard was a project of Ribéry's sponsor Nike and was on display for the duration of the 2010 World Cup. More recently, he was one of several international superstars featured in Nike's "The Last Game", a five-minute animated ad made during the run-up to the 2014 World Cup that went viral.

He appeared in the music video for "Même pas fatigué !!!" by Magic System and Khaled. The single released in 2009 stayed seven weeks at number one in SNEP French Singles Chart.

== Personal life ==
Ribéry's younger brothers, François and Steeven, are also football players. François played for many amateur clubs in France, among others for Bayonne in the Championnat National. Steeven played for Bayern's reserve team for two years.

Ribéry is a convert to Islam, following which, he adopted the name Bilal Yusuf Mohammed.

Ribéry married Wahiba, a French national of Algerian descent and the couple have three daughters named Hiziya, Shahinez and Keltoum Chérifa, and two sons named Seif el Islam and Mohammed.

He also has another son, Franck, with his new partner Greta Beccaglia.

=== Indictment ===
On 18 April 2010, it was first reported by French television service M6 that four members of the French national team were being investigated for their roles as clients of a prostitution ring that was being operated inside a Paris nightclub, with some of the women possibly being underage. The report also stated that two of the players were already questioned as witnesses by judge André Dando and a group of magistrates. The report described the two players as being one who "is a major player in a big foreign club" and that the other "plays in the championship of France Ligue 1". Later that day, the players were discovered to be Ribéry and Karim Benzema. During his interview with Dando, Ribéry reportedly admitted to having had a relationship with a prostitute, but did not know that she was a minor at the time the relationship began.

On 29 April 2010, the country's Secretary of State for Sports Rama Yade, after refusing to publicly comment on the case in its infancy, declared that any player placed under investigation should not represent the France national team. The following day, a judicial source confirmed that Ribéry would not be placed under official investigation, if at all, before the start of the 2010 World Cup. On 20 July, Ribéry was questioned by Paris police and, following questioning, was indicted by judge Dando on the charge of "solicitation of a minor prostitute". In November 2011, prosecutors asked for the cases against Ribéry and Benzema to be dropped, saying that the players were not aware that the escort, identified as Zahia Dehar, was 16 years old at the time of the alleged encounters.

In June 2013, after two years of investigation, it was announced that Ribéry and Benzema would go on trial charged with underage sex. The trial began in Paris on 20 January 2014, with neither player nor Dehar present, but the charges were dropped ten days later after the judge ruled that, even assuming the alleged encounters had taken place, there was insufficient evidence they were aware that Dehar was a minor at the time. Benzema maintained that no such encounter had occurred. Ribery's lawyer, Carlo Alberto Brusa, said he was "very happy with the verdict".

== Career statistics ==
=== Club ===
Club	Season	League			Cup		Continental		Other^{1}		Total	
Club	Season	Division	Apps	Goals	Apps	Goals	Apps	Goals	Apps	Goals	Apps	Goals
Boulogne	2000–01	CFA	4	1	0	0	—		—		4	1
Boulogne	2001–02	Championnat National	24	5	1	0	—		—		25	5
Boulogne	Total		28	6	1	0	0	0	0	0	29	6
Alès	2002–03	Championnat National	19	1	0	0	—		—		19	1
Brest	2003–04	Championnat National	35	3	2	1	—		—		37	4
Metz	2004–05	Ligue 1	20	2	2	0	—		—		22	2
Galatasaray	2004–05	Süper Lig	14	0	3	1	—		—		17	1
Marseille	2005–06	Ligue 1	35	6	1	0	12	3	5	3	53	12
Marseille	2006–07	Ligue 1	25	5	1	0	4	0	7	1	37	6
Marseille	Total		60	11	2	0	16	3	12	4	90	18
Bayern Munich	2007–08	Bundesliga	28	11	5	2	11	3	2	3	46	19
Bayern Munich	2008–09	Bundesliga	25	9	3	1	8	4	—		36	14
Bayern Munich	2009–10	Bundesliga	19	4	4	2	7	1	—		30	7
Bayern Munich	2010–11	Bundesliga	25	7	3	2	4	2	0	0	32	11
Bayern Munich	2011–12	Bundesliga	32	12	4	2	14	3	—		50	17
Bayern Munich	2012–13	Bundesliga	27	10	3	0	12	1	1	0	43	11
Bayern Munich	2013–14	Bundesliga	22	10	4	1	10	3	3	2	39	16
Bayern Munich	2014–15	Bundesliga	15	5	2	1	6	3	0	0	23	9
Bayern Munich	2015–16	Bundesliga	13	2	2	0	7	0	0	0	22	2
Bayern Munich	2016–17	Bundesliga	22	5	3	0	6	0	1	0	32	5
Bayern Munich	2017–18	Bundesliga	20	5	5	1	8	0	1	0	34	6
Bayern Munich	2018–19	Bundesliga	25	6	5	0	7	1	1	0	38	7
Bayern Munich	Total		273	86	43	12	100	21	9	5	425	124
Fiorentina	2019–20	Serie A	21	3	0	0	—		—		21	3
Fiorentina	2020–21	Serie A	29	2	1	0	—		—		30	2
Fiorentina	Total		50	5	1	0	0	0	0	0	51	5
Salernitana	2021–22	Serie A	23	0	0	0	—		—		23	0
Salernitana	2022–23	Serie A	1	0	1	0	—		—		2	0
Salernitana	Total		24	0	1	0	0	0	0	0	25	0
Career total			523	114	55	14	116	24	21	9	715	161

- 1. Includes the French League Cup, German League Cup, German Super Cup, UEFA Super Cup, and FIFA Club World Cup.

=== International ===
National team	Year	Apps	Goals
France	2006	15	1
France	2007	9	1
France	2008	8	3
France	2009	8	2
France	2010	7	0
France	2011	8	0
France	2012	14	4
France	2013	11	5
France	2014	1	0
Total		81	16

International goals

France score listed first, score and result columns indicate score after each Ribéry goal.

No.	Date	Venue	Opponent	Score	Result	Competition
1	27 June 2006	AWD-Arena, Hanover, Germany	Spain	1–1	3–1	2006 FIFA World Cup
2	2 June 2007	Stade de France, Saint-Denis, France	Ukraine	1–0	2–0	UEFA Euro 2008 qualifying
3	26 March 2008	Stade de France, Saint-Denis, France	England	1–0	1–0	Friendly
4	3 June 2008	Stade de France, Saint-Denis, France	Colombia	1–0	1–0	Friendly
5	11 October 2008	Stadionul Farul, Constanţa, Romania	Romania	1–2	2–2	2010 FIFA World Cup qualification
6	28 March 2009	S. Darius and S. Girėnas Stadium, Kaunas, Lithuania	Lithuania	1–0	1–0	2010 FIFA World Cup qualification
7	1 April 2009	Stade de France, Saint-Denis, France	Lithuania	1–0	1–0	2010 FIFA World Cup qualification
8	27 May 2012	Stade du Hainaut, Valenciennes, France	Iceland	2–2	3–2	Friendly
9	31 May 2012	Stade Auguste Delaune, Reims, France	Serbia	1–0	2–0	Friendly
10	5 June 2012	MMArena, Le Mans, France	Estonia	1–0	4–0	Friendly
11	11 September 2012	Stade de France, Saint-Denis, France	Belarus	3–1	3–1	2014 FIFA World Cup qualification
12	22 March 2013	Stade de France, Saint-Denis, France	Georgia	3–0	3–1	2014 FIFA World Cup qualification
13	10 September 2013	Central Stadium, Gomel, Belarus	Belarus	1–1	4–2	2014 FIFA World Cup qualification
14	10 September 2013	Central Stadium, Gomel, Belarus	Belarus	2–2	4–2	2014 FIFA World Cup qualification
15	11 October 2013	Parc des Princes, Paris, France	Australia	1–0	6–0	Friendly
16	15 October 2013	Stade de France, Saint-Denis, France	Finland	1–0	3–0	2014 FIFA World Cup qualification

== Honours ==
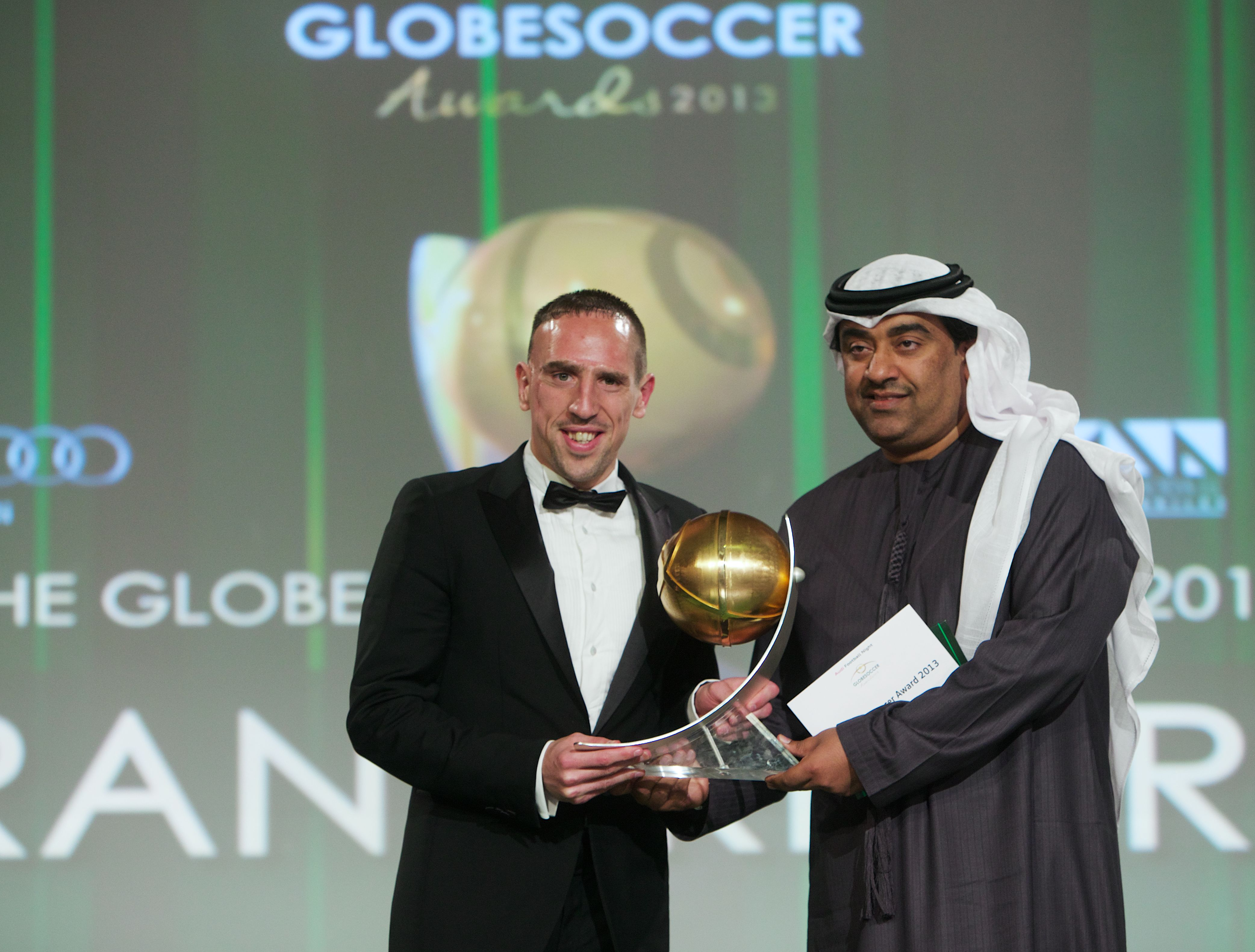
Ribéry collecting the Globe Soccer Awards Best Player of the Year award in 2013

Galatasaray

- Turkish Cup: 2004–05

Marseille

- UEFA Intertoto Cup: 2005

Bayern Munich

- Bundesliga: 2007–08, 2009–10, 2012–13, 2013–14, 2014–15, 2015–16, 2016–17, 2017–18, 2018–19
- DFB-Pokal: 2007–08, 2009–10, 2012–13, 2013–14, 2015–16, 2018–19
- DFB-Ligapokal: 2007
- DFL-Supercup: 2012, 2016, 2017, 2018
- UEFA Champions League: 2012–13
- UEFA Super Cup: 2013
- FIFA Club World Cup: 2013

France

- FIFA World Cup runner-up: 2006

Individual

- UNFP Ligue 1 Player of the Month: August 2004, October 2005, November 2005, April 2006
- UNFP Ligue 1 Young Player of the Year: 2006
- UNFP Ligue 1 Goal of the Year: 2006
- UNFP Ligue 1 Team of the Year: 2006
- UNFP 20 Year Special Team Trophy: 2011
- Etoile d'Or: 2006
- Onze de Bronze: 2006, 2008
- French Player of the Year: 2007, 2008, 2013
- Footballer of the Year in Germany: 2008
- ESM Team of the Year: 2007–08, 2012–13
- UEFA Team of the Year: 2008, 2013
- UEFA Best Player in Europe Award: 2012–13
- UEFA Super Cup Man of the Match: 2013
- kicker Bundesliga Team of the Season: 2007–08, 2008–09, 2011–12, 2012–13, 2013–14
- UEFA Champions League top assist provider: 2011–12
- Bundesliga top assist provider: 2010–11, 2011–12, 2012–13
- Bundesliga Player of the Year: 2012–13
- The kicker Man of the Year: 2013
- Globe Soccer Best Footballer of the Year: 2013
- FIFA Club World Cup Golden Ball: 2013
- FIFA Club World Cup Most Valuable Player of the Final: 2013
- FIFA FIFPRO World 11: 2013
- FIFA FIFPRO World 11 5th team: 2014
- FIFA Ballon d'Or third place: 2013
- DFB-Pokal top assist provider: 2016–17
- Bundesliga Goal of the Month: May 2019
- Serie A Player of the Month: September 2019
- Fiorentina Player of the Season: 2019–20

== See also ==
- Zahia Affair
