= International Festival of Fashion Photography =

Festival in Cannes dedicated to fashion photography

The International Festival of Fashion Photography, also known as Cannes Photo Mode, was an annual fashion photography festival held in Cannes, France, from 2002 to 2014. The event presented large-scale outdoor displays along public spaces such as La Croisette.

By 2009 the festival had reached its seventh edition, featuring an homage to Guy Bourdin. Exhibitions were installed on the Croisette and at the Palm Beach Casino, with prizes awarded by a professional jury.

In 2014, the twelfth edition ran during the summer season and welcomed 90 photographers. German photographer Chico Bialas was the guest of honour.

== Format and venues ==
The festival’s format emphasised large-scale outdoor displays accessible to the public, with installations along La Croisette and additional shows hosted at venues such as the Palm Beach Casino and the Espace Miramar. In 2014, the twelfth edition brought together 90 photographers, with exhibitions spread across several locations in Cannes.

== Guests of honour ==
Each year the festival highlighted the work of a guest photographer.

- 2007: Gilles Bensimon
- 2008: Marc Hispard
- 2009: Guy Bourdin
- 2010: Jacques Olivar
- 2011: Tyen
- 2013: Sacha Van Dorssen
- 2014: Chico Bialas

== See also ==
- Fashion photography
