= Max (Italian magazine) =

Italian men's magazine

- Categories: Men's magazine
- Frequency: Monthly
- Founded: 1985
- Final issue: 2013
- Company: RCS MediaGroup
- Country: Italy
- Based in: Milan
- Language: Italian
- Website: max.gazzetta.it

Max was a monthly magazine published in Italy published between 1985 and 2013. The magazine was part of the RCS MediaGroup and had a monthly circulation of about 200,000 copies.

== History ==
Aimed primarily at a male audience, Max debuted on newsstands in 1985 based in Milan by Paul Pietroni. Max mainly addressed issues related to travel, fashion, movies, music, and television shows, complemented by news and reports from around the world.

Particularly notable is the history of the Max calendar, published annually since 1990, featuring celebrities from the entertainment world. Over the years, several celebrities took turns on its pages, including Monica Bellucci (photographed by Helmut Newton), Adriana Lima, Anna Falchi, Sabrina Ferilli, Alessia Marcuzzi, Nina Morić, Giorgia Palmas, Elisabetta Canalis, Megan Gale, Alena Seredova and Mara Carfagna in the calendar marketed to men, and Raul Bova and Alessandro Gassman in the one marketed to women. In 2008, the calendar changed its name to Book of the Year. In this new format, which featured the Argentine singer Lola Ponce, there were also personal photos, comments, and thoughts of the subjects. The 2008 edition was also the last year in which this work was published.

In 2007 Max had a circulation of 152,155 copies.

In 2012 RCS MediaGroup decided to integrate Max with sports daily La Gazzetta dello Sport, beginning on 11 April of that year. Max integrated its website with that of the sports newspaper, coordinating headings and interests. The magazine ceased publication in 2013.

== See also ==
List of magazines published in Italy
