= 2009–10 Olympique Lyonnais season =

Lyon
2009–10 season
- Owner: OL Groupe
- Chairman: Jean-Michel Aulas
- Manager: Claude Puel
- Stadium: Stade de Gerland
- Ligue 1: 2nd
- Coupe de France: Round of 32
- Coupe de la Ligue: Quarter-finals
- Champions League: Semi-finals
- Top goalscorer: League: Lisandro López (15); All: Lisandro López (24)
- Highest home attendance: 40,327 vs Real Madrid (16 February 2010)
- Lowest home attendance: 20,010 vs Metz (13 January 2010)
Home colours	Away colours	Third colours

The 2009–10 season was French football club Olympique Lyonnais's 51st season in Ligue 1 and was their 21st consecutive season in the top division of French football. For the first time in seven years, Lyon entered the football season without defending the Ligue 1 title. They were overthrown by Bordeaux who claimed the title on the final day of 2008–09 season. This was also the first time in nine years Lyon had to earn qualification to the group stage of the UEFA Champions League as they began from the playoff round, due to their third-place finish last season.

== News ==
On 6 June 2009, it was announced by Lyon that fitness coach Robert Duverne had quit his position to focus full-time on the France national team, who were attempting to qualify for the 2010 World Cup. Vincent Espié, who had previously worked as fitness coach for Claude Puel's former club Lille, was brought in as his replacement.

Departures this summer include long time Lyonnais Juninho, who, after spending a respectable eight seasons at the club, moved to Qatari club Al-Gharafa. Defender Sandy Paillot joined fellow Ligue 1 club Grenoble for a fee of €2 million after spending almost a year-and-a-half on loan at the club. Also during this summer window, a host of youth players who were either deemed surplus to requirements or looking to find some significant playing time departed the club. Pierrick Valdivia, Ayan Si-Mohamed and Alexis Carra moved to Sedan, Stade Reims and Italian club Vicenza, respectively. Midfielder Romain Dedola and defender Morgan Ancian both joined Strasbourg, while Quentin Barlet and Jérémy Dequelson joined lesser rivals Lyon Duchère. Another youth player, Jérémy Pied, joined Metz on loan for the entire 2009–10 season with hopes that the player will receive greater playing time.

On 1 July 2009, Lyon surprisingly announced that they had reached an agreement with Spanish club Real Madrid for the transfer of Karim Benzema, who reportedly wanted to stay at least one more year with his hometown club. The transfer fee was priced at €35m with the fee rising to as much as €41m based on incentives. A day later, Lyon confirmed the departure of Ivorian winger Abdul Kader Keïta who, despite being Lyon's highest paid transfer at that time, failed to live up to expectations. Keïta moved to Turkish club Galatasaray, with Lyon earning €8.5 million for the player. On 5 August, the club announced the departure of striker Frédéric Piquionne, who joined English club Portsmouth on loan for the entire season. One week later, various sources in France reported that defender John Mensah would be joining English club Sunderland on loan for the season, with the club also having an option to purchase the player for a fee of €7 million following the season. The move was subject to Mensah passing a medical and being granted a work permit, which was completed a week-and-a-half later.

On 7 July, Lyon confirmed their first transfer arrival to the club. After almost two weeks of negotiations with Portuguese club Porto, Lyon reached an agreement on a transfer fee for the Argentine striker Lisandro López. The transfer fee was priced at €24 million, with the fee rising to as much as €28 million with incentives, thereby making López the club's most expensive signing. The following week, Lyon addressed an important need after reaching an agreement with Lille for the transfer of the Brazilian left winger Michel Bastos, with the transfer fee being approximately €18 million. Two days later, Lyon filled another need, signing another Porto player in left back Aly Cissokho for €15 million. An additional incentive involved in the deal is Porto will receive 20 percent of any future transfer fee Lyon receives for the player. On 29 July, Lyon, who admitted they needed at least one more striker, announced the signing of French international Bafétimbi Gomis from rivals Saint-Étienne, with the fee being approximately €13 million.

Before the summer signings, Lyon announced that two youth players would be promoted to the club's first team after agreeing to professional contracts. Defender Loïc Abenzoar and midfielder Maxime Gonalons both agreed to three-year professional contracts tying them to the club until 2012. Also, following the season, Lyon signed left back Timothée Kolodziejczak, who had been on a season long loan from Lens. Kolodziejczak agreed to a four-year contract and Lyon paid Lens €2.5 million. Lyon also completed the signing of 16-year-old Swiss goalkeeper Jérémy Frick, who signed a two-year deal. Frick, formerly of Servette, will join the club's youth academy.

== Transfers ==
=== Summer in ===
No.	Pos.	Nat.	Name	Age	EU	Moving from	Type	Transfer window	Ends	Transfer fee	Source
46	DF	(France)	Abenzoar	20	EU	Youth system	Promoted ✓	Summer	2012	Youth system	Mercato365
41	MF	(France)	Gonalons	20	EU	Youth system	Promoted ✓	Summer	2012	Youth system	L'Equipe
16	GK	(Switzerland)	Frick	16	Non-EU	Servette (Switzerland)	Transferred ✓	Summer	2011	Free	LyonCapitale
23	DF	(Brazil)	Anderson	29	Non-EU	Cruzeiro (Brazil)	Loan Return ✓	Summer	2010	N/A	
24	MF	(France)	Beynié	22	EU	Tubize (Belgium)	Loan Return ✓	Summer	2010	N/A	
12	DF	(France)	Kolodziejczak	17	EU	Lens	Transferred ✓	Summer	2013	€2.5M	Sports.fr
9	FW	(Argentina)	Lisandro	26	Non-EU	Porto (Portugal)	Transferred ✓	Summer	2014	€24M	OLWeb
7	MF	(Brazil)	Bastos	25	Non-EU	Lille	Transferred ✓	Summer	2013	€18M	OLWeb
20	DF	(France)	Cissokho	21	EU	Porto (Portugal)	Transferred ✓	Summer	2014	€15M	OLWeb
18	FW	(France)	Gomis	23	EU	Saint-Étienne	Transferred ✓	Summer	2014	€13M	OLWeb

=== Winter In ===
No.	Pos.	Nat.	Name	Age	EU	Moving from	Type	Transfer window	Ends	Transfer fee	Source
26	DF	(Croatia)	Lovren	20	EU	Dinamo Zagreb (Croatia)	Transferred ✓	Winter	2014	€10M	OLWeb

Total spending: ▼€82.5 million

=== Summer out ===
No.	Pos.	Nat.	Name	Age	EU	Moving to	Type	Transfer window	Transfer fee	Source
15	DF	(France)	Paillot	22	EU	Grenoble	Transferred ✓	Summer	€2M	L'Equipe
13	MF	(France)	Valdivia	21	EU	Sedan	Contract ended ✓	Summer	Free	Ouest-France
47	MF	(France)	Dedola	20	EU	Strasbourg	Transferred ✓	Summer	Free	L'Equipe
	DF	(France)	Ancian	18	EU	Strasbourg	Transferred ✓	Summer	Free	
	FW	(France)	Carra	19	EU	Vicenza (Italy)	Transferred ✓	Summer	Free	Mercato365
8	MF	(Brazil)	Juninho	34	EU	Al Gharafa (Qatar)	Transferred ✓	Summer	Free	L'Equipe
26	MF	(Brazil)	Fábio Santos	28	Non-EU	Fluminense (Brazil)	Transferred ✓	Summer	Free	MaisFutebol
10	FW	(France)	Benzema	21	EU	Real Madrid (Spain)	Transferred ✓	Summer	€35M	OLWeb
23	FW	(Ivory Coast)	Keïta	27	EU	Galatasaray (Turkey)	Transferred ✓	Summer	€8.5M	Galatasaray
34	MF	(France)	Pied	20	EU	Metz	Loaned ✓	Summer	N/A	L'Equipe
	MF	(France)	Si-Mohamed	19	EU	Reims	Transferred ✓	Summer	Free	Stade Reims
	MF	(France)	Barlet	20	EU	Lyon Duchère	Transferred ✓	Summer	Free	Foot-National
	DF	(France)	Dequelson	18	EU	Lyon Duchère	Transferred ✓	Summer	Free	
39	FW	(France)	Piquionne	30	EU	Portsmouth (England)	Loaned ✓	Summer	N/A	OLWeb
15	DF	(Ghana)	Mensah	26	Non-EU	Sunderland (England)	Loaned ✓	Summer	N/A	Mercato365
27	MF	(France)	Mounier	21	EU	Nice	Transferred ✓	Summer	€2.5M	L'Equipe
11	DF	(Italy)	Grosso	31	EU	Juventus (Italy)	Transferred ✓	Summer	€2M	L'Equipe

=== Winter out ===
No.	Pos.	Nat.	Name	Age	EU	Moving to	Type	Transfer window	Transfer fee	Source
24	MF	(France)	Beynié	22	EU	Gueugnon	Transferred ✓	Winter	Undisclosed	OLWeb.fr

Total income: ▲€50 million

== Squad ==
Last updated 15 May 2010 Note: Flags indicate national team as defined under FIFA eligibility rules; some limited exceptions apply. Players may hold more than one non-FIFA nationality.

No.	Pos.	Nation	Player
1	GK	FRA	Hugo Lloris
2	DF	FRA	François Clerc
3	DF	BRA	Cris
4	DF	FRA	Jean-Alain Boumsong
5	MF	FRA	Mathieu Bodmer
6	MF	SWE	Kim Källström
7	FW	BRA	Michel Bastos
8	MF	BIH	Miralem Pjanić
9	FW	ARG	Lisandro López
10	MF	BRA	Ederson
12	DF	FRA	Timothée Kolodziejczak
13	DF	FRA	Anthony Réveillère
14	FW	FRA	Sidney Govou

No.	Pos.	Nation	Player
17	MF	CMR	Jean Makoun
18	FW	FRA	Bafétimbi Gomis
19	MF	ARG	César Delgado
20	DF	FRA	Aly Cissokho
21	MF	FRA	Maxime Gonalons
22	MF	FRA	Clément Grenier
25	GK	FRA	Joan Hartock
26	DF	CRO	Dejan Lovren
28	MF	FRA	Jérémy Toulalan
29	FW	FRA	Yannis Tafer
30	GK	FRA	Rémy Vercoutre
32	DF	FRA	Lamine Gassama
36	DF	FRA	Sébastien Faure

|}

- Last updated: 15 May
- Source: Olympique Lyonnais, ESPN.com

== Team kit ==
Umbro will manufacture the kits for Lyon. Umbro have been the official kit provider of Lyon since 2003 and, two years ago, signed an extension with Lyon until 2013. This season, Lyon will have brand-new home, away, Champions League kits, which were revealed to the public on 12 July, despite the shirts leaking on 17 June. The home shirt has a white base color, with the horizontal red and blue stripe in the middle, reverting from the club's red and blue vertical stripe that has been used in previous years. The logo of Umbro appears on the top-right of the shirt in blue. The away shirt features a black and red design. The top part of the shirt is black and it fades horizontally in the middle into red. The shirt has a partly red collar, and also has red details on the black sleeves. The European kit is midnight blue with the horizontal red and blue stripe locating in the middle of the shirt.

Home	Away	Euro	Goalkeeper Home Kit	Goalkeeper Away Kit	Goalkeeper Third Kit

== Club ==
=== Coaching staff ===
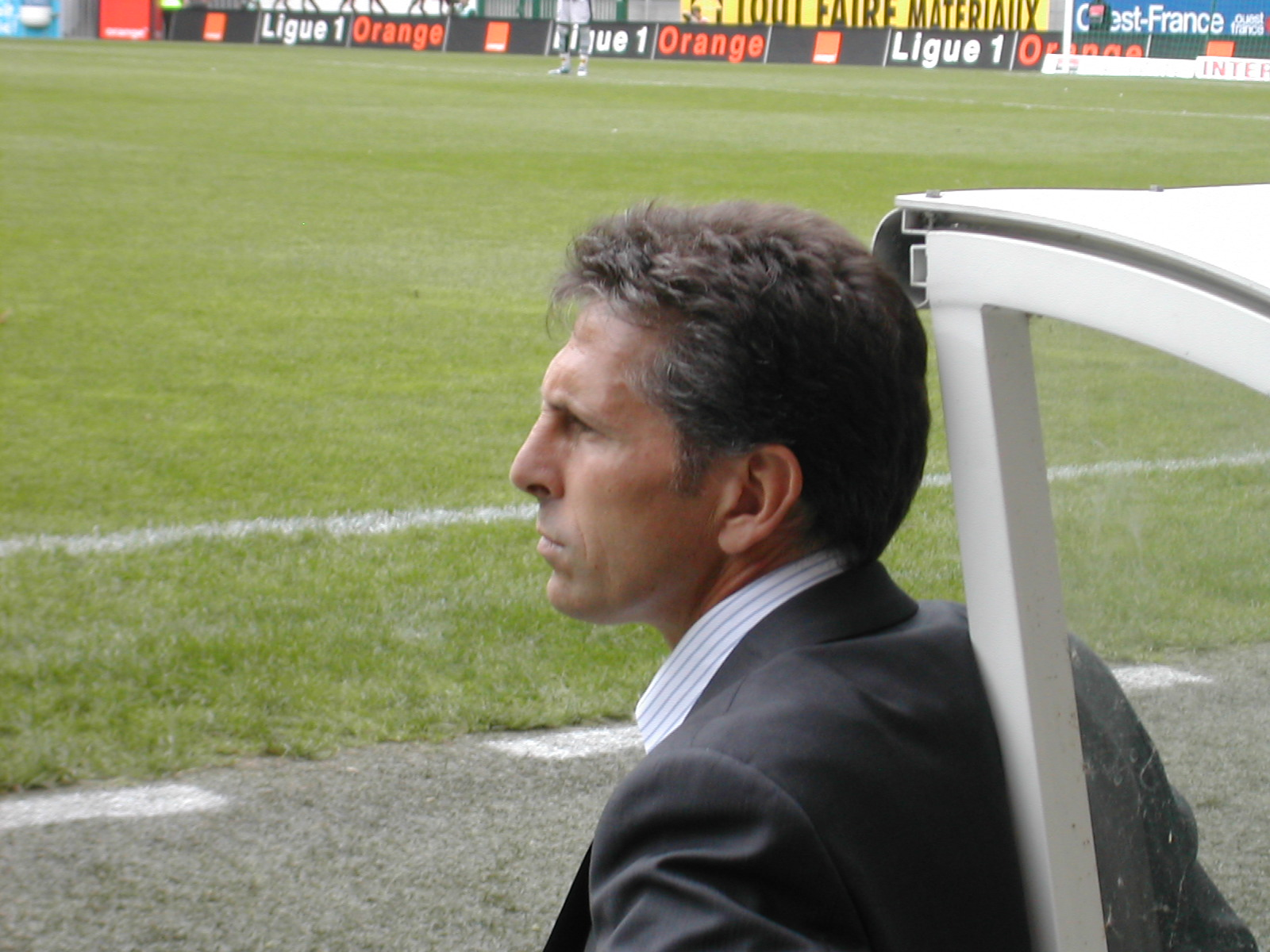
Claude Puel, second season in charge of Lyon.

Position	Staff
Manager	(France) Claude Puel
Assistant manager	(France) Patrick Collot
Assistant manager	(France) Bruno Génésio
First team coach	(France) Christophe Toni
Technical coach	(France) Rémi Garde
Striker coach	(Brazil) Sonny Anderson
Goalkeeper coach	(France) Joël Bats
Team doctor	(France) Emmanuel Ohrant
Physiotherapist	(France) Sylvain Rousseau
Physiotherapist	(France) Patrick Perret
Physiotherapist	(France) Abdeljelil Redissi
Fitness coach	(France) Vincent Espié
Intendant	(France) Guy Genet
Intendant	(France) Jérôme Renaud

Last updated: 27 July
Source: OLweb.fr

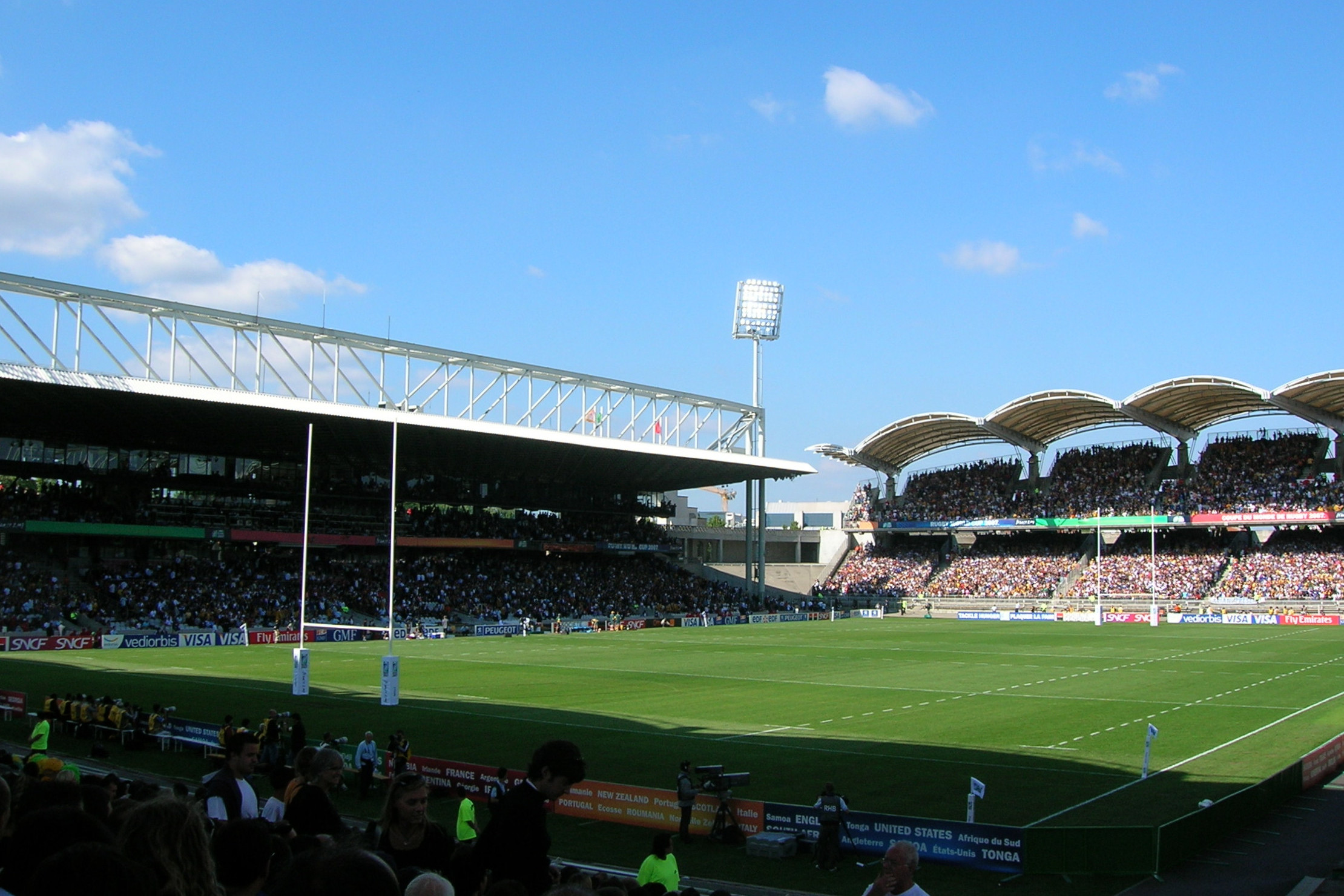
Stade de Gerland, current stadia of Lyon.

=== Other information ===
Chairman	(France) Jean-Michel Aulas
Special Advisor	(France) Bernard Lacombe
Club Director	(France) Olivier Blanc
Sporting Director	(France) Marino Faccioli
Club Ambassador	(Brazil) Sonny Anderson
Ground (capacity and dimensions)	Stade de Gerland (41,044 / 112x65 meters)

Updated to match played 8 June
Source: OLweb.fr

== Pre-season ==
Lyon opened their pre-season in their usual setting training in the mountainous Rhône-Alpes commune of Tignes. Lyon confirmed several preseason friendly matches. Lyon also participated in the Peace Cup for the fourth time having won the exhibition tournament in 2007. On 11 July, Lyon opened up their pre-season facing fellow Ligue 1 club Nice in Albertville. Lyon won the match 1–0 with the lone goal of the match coming from Ederson in the 12th minute of play.

A week later, Lyon hosted Lens in Arnas. Lyon trailed 0–2 heading into the 80th minute with both of Lens goals being scored as a result of Lyon mistakes. The first goal being scored due to an unexpected turnover by Sidney Govou and the second being scored as a result of casual, yet lazy play between defensemen Jean-Alain Boumsong and Timothée Kolodziejczak, with the former being more responsible. Lyon completed the comeback with both of their goals being scored by the Swede Kim Källström, the first being a free kick in the 85th minute and the second in the 89th minute to draw the match at 2–2, which was the final scoreline.

From 24 July to 2 August, Lyon will be among several top clubs that will participate in the 2009 Peace Cup held in Andalusia, Spain. Clubs playing in their group and whom they will face are defending Primeira Liga champions Porto and 2008–09 Süper Lig champions Beşiktaş, whom they played first. Lyon controlled the match for the majority of and eventually got a goal in the 69th minute from Kim Källström after a nice backheel assist from Miralem Pjanić. Leading 1–0 heading into the final minutes, Lyon's defense fell off, with Beşiktaş's first chance being cleared off the line by Pjanić leading to a corner. On the ensuing corner, the Turkish club equalised with the goal coming off the head of Mert Nobre in the 84th minute. That would be the eventual scoreline giving both clubs one point heading into their matches with Porto. In the match, Lyon suffered their first defeat of the season losing 0–2 with both of Porto's goals being scored by the Brazilian Hulk eliminating Lyon from the Peace Cup and also ending their preseason with 11 days to spare ahead of their opening league match against Le Mans.

On 28 July, however, Lyon announced that on 30 July, they will play La Liga club Sevilla, who were also eliminated from the Peace Cup, in a friendly match at the Estadio Ramón Sánchez Pizjuán. They later announced, upon the club's return to France, they will face another La Liga side in Deportivo de La Coruña in Aix-les-Bains. In the Sevilla match, despite the debut of Lisandro López and boasting an almost full strength side, Lyon failed to get on the scoreboard losing 0–1 making the defeat their second straight loss in the preseason. Three days later, Lyon earned a positive result drawing 2–2 with Deportivo with both of their goals coming from new players Bafétimbi Gomis and López. Lyon ended the preseason with a record of one win, three draws and two defeats.

Friendly

11 July 2009	Lyon (France)	1–0	(France) Nice	Albertville
19:00	Ederson 12'	Report		Stadium: Stade du Parc Olympique

18 July 2009	Lyon (France)	2–2	(France) Lens	Arnas
19:00	Källström 86'; Källström 89'	Report	Boukari 3'; Eduardo 56'	Stadium: Stade d'Arnas

30 July 2009	Sevilla (Spain)	1–0	(France) Lyon	Seville, Spain
21:30	Chevantón 86'	Report	Makoun (red card) 53'; Clerc (red card) 60'	Stadium: Estadio Guadalquivir

2 August 2009	Lyon (France)	2–2	(Spain) Deportivo La Coruña	Aix-les-Bains, France
18:30	Gomis 50'; López 74'	Report	Riki 4' (pen.); Juca 88'	Stadium: Stade d'Aix-les-Bains

6 January 2010	Club Africain (Tunisia)	1–1	(France) Lyon	Radès, Tunisia
18:30	Maâm'ri 90+5'	Report	Gomis 29'	Stadium: Stade 7 November

Peace Cup

25 July 2009	Lyon (France)	1–1	(Turkey) Beşiktaş	Huelva, Spain
20:30	Källström 63'	Report	Nobre 84'	Stadium: Estadio Nuevo Colombino; Attendance: 300; Referee: Manuel Mejuto González (Spain)

27 July 2009	Lyon (France)	0–2	(Portugal) Porto	Huelva, Spain
22:30		Report	Hulk 9', 75'	Stadium: Estadio Nuevo Colombino; Attendance: 1,300; Referee: Eduardo Iturralde González (Spain)

== Competitions ==
Competition	Started round	Current position / round	Final position / round	First match	Last match
Ligue 1	—	2nd	2nd	8 August	15 May
UEFA Champions League	Playoff Round	Semi-finals	Semi-finals	19 August	27 April
Coupe de la Ligue	Round of 16	Quarterfinals	Quarterfinals	12 January	27 January
Coupe de France	Round of 64	Round of 32	Round of 32	9 January	24 January

Updated to match played 15 May 2010
Source: Competitions

=== Ligue 1 ===
Olympique Lyonnais began their league campaign on the road taking on Le Mans at the Stade Léon-Bollée. Lyon started off the match very slow and eventually allowed a goal that was scored by Modibo Maïga in just the 21st minute. Lyon responded just seven minutes later with a goal from the converted defender Mathieu Bodmer, who equalized on a shot at the top of the box as a result of a great pass from Lisandro López. Following the break, Le Mans came out quickly in the attack and were awarded a questionable penalty by referee Lionel Jaffredo. The young Mathieu Coutadeur converted the penalty giving the home team a 2–1 lead. In the ensuing minutes, Lyon slowly lost focus, but were eventually revived when new signing Bafétimbi Gomis came on in the 77th minute. Their newfound attack still drew no goals and heading into the injury time session, Lyon were awarded a free kick just outside the penalty box. With new signings and free kick specialists Michel Bastos and López both standing over the ball, it was the latter who took it and placed the ball easily into the back of the net drawing the match at 2–2 and giving Lyon their first point of the season. Lyon's first at home was against Valenciennes. With a pivotal Champions League match coming up early next week and Jérémy Toulalan also going on international duty, he was partially rested for the match, which featured the midfield combination of Jean Makoun and Kim Källström. Lyon won the match 1–0 with a goal from Gomis, his first with the club, in the 37th minute. The goal was assisted on by Michel Bastos. The victory initially moved Lyon into fourth-place, but after the next day's matches, Lyon fell to eighth. The following week, Lyon faced Auxerre on the road. After their strong performance mid-week in the Champions League, manager Claude Puel implemented exactly the same formation, albeit with different players in certain positions. Despite missing several goal opportunities mid-week, César Delgado responded by dishing out two assists, the first on the club's opening goal scored by Jean-Alain Boumsong, who was making his season debut, and the club's second goal, scored by Miralem Pjanić, his first career league goal for the club. Lyon won the match 3–0. The Auxerre match was notable as it marked the debut of the highly rated 17-year-old Ishak Belfodil, who came on as a substitute in the 84th minute. The next week, Lyon returned home and were victors again claiming a 3–1 victory over Nancy, with all three Lyon goals coming from new signings Bastos, López and Gomis.

Following a long international break, Lyon faced Lorient at home, their first and only back-to-back home league match set. In the match, which was fairly even looking at the statistics, Lyon controlled possession for 57 percent of the match, but did not score a goal until the 72nd following a perfect cross from Sidney Govou into the box, which landed at the head of Michel Bastos and then into the back of the net. Lyon maintained the 1–0 lead to win the match moving the club into a tie for second place with title rivals Bordeaux. The following week, Lyon faced rivals Paris Saint-Germain at the Parc des Princes in a match that saw a Lyon side missing several key players. In the 29th minute, the Parisians got a well-deserved goal from former Lyon player Ludovic Giuly. Despite the home side maintaining their attack well into the second half, their first half goal was canceled out following an Aly Cissokho cross into the box that saw Bafétimbi Gomis get a slight touch on the ball to get it past Grégory Coupet. The goal secured a point for Lyon and also allowed the club to maintain their top 2 position in the table. Lyon contested up-and-comers Toulouse the following match day. Lyon defense was again the first to concede allowing a goal from youngster Moussa Sissoko in just the eighth minute. Despite conceding early, however, Lyon's attack was extremely uptempo, which allowed the away side to break into numerous counterattacks. Lyon's attack finally paid off, in the 52nd minute following a goal from Yannis Tafer, which was his first professional goal. Tafer, who came on as a half-time substitute, secured the goal following a cross into the box by the dangerous Cissokho. The French youth international ran near post and got a shot off high into the visiting net. With Lyon's confidence high, their attack increased, which led to numerous chances. Eventually, Lyon got a goal from Gomis, his second in two matches to give the club a 2–1 victory. The following week, Lyon reached top of the table for the first time this season, courtesy of a 2–0 win over Lens. Despite enduring a hostile crowd and constant pressure from Lens, Lyon and their defense stood tall with Govou and Kim Källström getting both goals in the seventh and 78th minute, respectively.

==== League table ====
Pos	Team	Pld	W	D	L	GF	GA	GD	Pts	Qualification or relegation
1	Marseille (C)	38	23	9	6	69	36	+33	78	Qualification to Champions League group stage
2	Lyon	38	20	12	6	64	38	+26	72	Qualification to Champions League group stage
3	Auxerre	38	20	11	7	42	29	+13	71	Qualification to Champions League play-off round
4	Lille	38	21	7	10	72	40	+32	70	Qualification to Europa League play-off round (Note: Coupe de France winners Paris Saint-Germain qualify for the 2010–11 UEFA Europa League Play-off round of 2010–11 UEFA Europa League.)
5	Montpellier	38	20	9	9	50	40	+10	69	Qualification to Europa League third qualifying round (Note: Coupe de la Ligue winners Marseille finished as champions, fulfilling a finish of at least 4th place, thus their Europa League Third qualifying round berth will go to the 5th placed team in the league.)

Source: Ligue 1
Rules for classification: 1) points; 2) goal difference; 3) number of goals scored.
(C) Champions

==== Results summary ====
Overall								Home						Away					
Pld	W	D	L	GF	GA	GD	Pts	W	D	L	GF	GA	GD	W	D	L	GF	GA	GD
38	20	12	6	62	37	+25	72	12	4	3	30	16	+14	8	8	3	32	21	+11

Source: lfp.fr

==== Results by round ====
Round	1	2	3	4	5	6	7	8	9	10	11	12	13	14	15	16	17	18	19	20	21	22	23	24	25	26	27	28	29	30	31	32	33	34	35	36	37	38
Ground	A	H	A	H	H	A	H	A	H	A	H	A	H	A	H	A	H	A	H	A	A	H	A	H	A	H	A	H	A	H	A	H	A	H	A	H	A	H
Result	D	W	W	W	W	D	W	W	L	L	W	D	D	D	L	L	W	D	L	W	W	W	D	W	W	W	D	D	L	W	W	D	D	W	W	W	D	W
Position	10	8	2	3	2	2	2	1	1	3	2	2	3	2	4	9	4	4	6	5	5	4	4	4	4	3	3	5	6	5	1	3	3	3	4	4	4	2

Source: lfp.fr
A = Away; H = Home; W = Win; D = Draw; L = Loss

==== Matches ====
8 August 2009 1	Le Mans	2–2	Lyon	Le Mans
21:00	Maïga 21'; Coutadeur 58' (pen.)	Report	Bodmer 28'; López 90'	Stadium: Stade Léon-Bollée; Attendance: 10,391; Referee: Lionel Jaffredo

15 August 2009 2	Lyon	1–0	Valenciennes	Lyon
19:00	Gomis 37'	Report		Stadium: Stade de Gerland; Attendance: 31,745; Referee: Hervé Piccirillo

22 August 2009 3	Auxerre	0–3	Lyon	Auxerre
19:00		Report	Boumsong 30'; Makoun 45'; Pjanić 65'	Stadium: Stade de l'Abbé-Deschamps; Attendance: 15,294; Referee: Stéphane Bre

29 August 2009 4	Lyon	3–1	Nancy	Lyon
21:00	Gomis 38'; López 51'; Bastos 68'	Report	Hadji 55'	Stadium: Stade de Gerland; Attendance: 34,193; Referee: Saïd Ennjimi

12 September 2009 5	Lyon	1–0	Lorient	Lyon
19:00	Bastos 72'	Report		Stadium: Stade de Gerland; Attendance: 36,600; Referee: Pascal Vileo

20 September 2009 6	Paris Saint-Germain	1–1	Lyon	Paris
21:00	Giuly 29'	Report	Gomis 85'	Stadium: Parc des Princes; Attendance: 44,778; Referee: Fredy Fautrel

26 September 2009 7	Lyon	2–1	Toulouse	Lyon
21:00	Tafer 52'; Gomis 71'	Report	Sissoko 8'	Stadium: Stade de Gerland; Attendance: 34,031; Referee: Bruno Coue

3 October 2009 8	Lens	0–2	Lyon	Lens
21:00		Report	Govou 7'; Källström 78'	Stadium: Stade Félix-Bollaert; Attendance: 39,423; Referee: Laurent Duhamel

17 October 2009 9	Lyon	0–2	Sochaux	Lyon
19:00		Report	Faty 17'; Privat 89'	Stadium: Stade de Gerland; Attendance: 36,489; Referee: Olivier Thual

24 October 2009 10	Nice	4–1	Lyon	Nice
19:00	Bagayoko 17'; Cissokho 40' (o.g.); Hellebuyck 69'; Rémy 74'	Report	Ederson 84'	Stadium: Stade du Ray; Attendance: 10,793; Referee: Lionel Jaffredo

31 October 2009 12	Saint-Étienne	0–1	Lyon	Saint-Étienne
21:00		Report	Gomis 83'	Stadium: Stade Geoffroy-Guichard; Attendance: 34,342; Referee: Tony Chapron

8 November 2009 13	Lyon	5–5	Marseille	Lyon
21:00	Pjanić 3'; Govou 14'; López 80', 83' (pen.); Bastos 90+1'	Report	Diawara 11'; Cheyrou 44'; Koné 47'; Brandão 74'; Toulalan 90+2' (o.g.)	Stadium: Stade de Gerland; Attendance: 38,018; Referee: Stéphane Bré

21 November 2009 14	Grenoble	1–1	Lyon	Grenoble
19:00	Courtois (red card) 71'; Ljuboja 73'	Report	Delgado 66'	Stadium: Stade des Alpes; Attendance: 15,563; Referee: Clément Turpin

29 November 2009 15	Lyon	1–1	Rennes	Lyon
21:00	López 42'	Report	Gyan 14'	Stadium: Stade de Gerland; Attendance: 35,978; Referee: Phillipe Malige

6 December 2009 16	Lille	4–3	Lyon	Villeneuve-d'Ascq
21:00	Frau 23'; Gervinho 53', 90+2'; Cabaye 70' (pen.)	Report	Lisandro López 1', 21' (pen.), 34'	Stadium: Stadium Nord Lille Métropole; Attendance: 14,206; Referee: Fredy Fautrel

13 December 2009 17	Lyon	0–1	Bordeaux	Lyon
21:00		Report	Chamakh 86'	Stadium: Stade de Gerland; Attendance: 36,887; Referee: Stéphane Lannoy

16 December 2009 11	Lyon	2–0	Boulogne	Lyon
19:00	Pjanić 72'; Delgado 90+1'	Report		Stadium: Stade de Gerland; Attendance: 37,512; Referee: Sébastien Moreira

20 December 2009 18	Monaco	1–1	Lyon	Fontvieille
21:00	Park 34'	Report	Bastos 21'	Stadium: Stade Louis II; Attendance: 10,620; Referee: Stéphane Bré

23 December 2009 19	Lyon	1–2	Montpellier	Lyon
19:00	Gomis 84'	Report	Montano 53'; Marveaux 86'	Stadium: Stade de Gerland; Attendance: 37,963; Referee: Laurent Duhamel

16 January 2010 20	Nancy	0–2	Lyon	Tomblaine
21:00		Report	Cris 79'; Gonalons 87'	Stadium: Stade Marcel Picot; Attendance: 16,097; Referee: Hervé Piccirillo

20 January 2010 21	Lorient	1–3	Lyon	Lorient
19:00	Ducasse 28'	Report	López 63'; Källström 71', 88'	Stadium: Stade du Moustoir; Attendance: 15,790; Referee: Stéphane Lannoy

31 January 2010 22	Lyon	2–1	Paris Saint-Germain	Lyon
21:00	Gomis 77'; Cris 81'	Report	Erdinç 10'; Sakho (red card) 61'	Stadium: Stade de Gerland; Attendance: 35,157; Referee: Philippe Kalt

7 February 2010 23	Toulouse	0–0	Lyon	Toulouse
17:00		Report		Stadium: Stadium Municipal; Attendance: 21,218; Referee: Antony Gautier

13 February 2010 24	Lyon	1–0	Lens	Lyon
21:00	Delgado 78'	Report		Stadium: Stade de Gerland; Attendance: 33,239; Referee: Bruno Coue

21 February 2010 25	Sochaux	0–4	Lyon	Montbéliard
17:00		Report	Bastos 5', 25', 26'; López 81'	Stadium: Stade Auguste Bonal; Attendance: 14,768; Referee: Ruddy Buquet

27 February 2010 26	Lyon	2–0	Nice	Lyon
19:00	López 9'; Apam 90+2' (o.g.)	Report		Stadium: Stade de Gerland; Attendance: 33,593; Referee: Christian Guillard

6 March 2010 27	Boulogne	0–0	Lyon	Boulogne-sur-Mer
19:00	Lachor (red card) 90+1'	Report		Stadium: Stade de la Libération; Attendance: 12,358; Referee: Damien Ledentu

13 March 2010 28	Lyon	1–1	Saint-Étienne	Lyon
21:00	López 79'	Report	Rivière 38'	Stadium: Stade de Gerland; Attendance: 36,199; Referee: Lionel Jaffredo

21 March 2010 29	Marseille	2–1	Lyon	Marseille
21:00	Kaboré 68'; Taiwo 81'	Report	Gomis 80'	Stadium: Stade Vélodrome; Attendance: 52,557; Referee: Fredy Fautrel

27 March 2010 30	Lyon	2–0	Grenoble	Lyon
17:00	Bastos 48'; Delgado 90'	Report	Cesar (red card) 76'	Stadium: Stade de Gerland; Attendance: 32,323; Referee: Sébastien Moreira

3 April 2010 31	Rennes	1–2	Lyon	Rennes
19:00	Gyan 15'	Report	Bastos 52'; López 61'	Stadium: Stade de la Route de Lorient; Attendance: 28,244; Referee: Olivier Thual

11 April 2010 32	Lyon	1–1	Lille	Lyon
17:00	Cris 71'; Gonalons (red card) 78'	Report	Frau 62'; Costa (red card) 70'	Stadium: Stade de Gerland; Attendance: 38,593; Referee: Philippe Kalt

17 April 2010 33	Bordeaux	2–2	Lyon	Bordeaux
21:00	Chamakh 26'; Plašil 62'; Trémoulinas (red card) 90'; Jussiê (red card) 90'	Report	Ederson 55'; Cris 71'; Réveillère (red card) 90'	Stadium: Stade Chaban-Delmas; Attendance: 32,284; Referee: Saïd Ennjimi

2 May 2010 35	Montpellier	0–1	Lyon	Montpellier
21:00		Report	Bastos 72'	Stadium: Stade de la Mosson; Attendance: 25,767; Referee: Antony Gautier

5 May 2010 36	Lyon	2–1	Auxerre	Lyon
19:00	López 45+1' (pen.); Pjanić 85'	Report	Jelen 15'	Stadium: Stade de Gerland; Attendance: 36,262; Referee: Olivier Thual

8 May 2010 37	Valenciennes	2–2	Lyon	Valenciennes
21:00	Audel 72'; Cohade 81' (sp)	Report	Källström 17'; Baldé 90+2' (o.g.)	Stadium: Stade Nungesser; Attendance: 13,206; Referee: Stéphane Bré

12 May 2010 34	Lyon	3–0	Monaco	Lyon
19:00	Pjanić 28'; Gomis 47'; López 87'	Report		Stadium: Stade de Gerland; Attendance: 38,432; Referee: Stéphane Lannoy

15 May 2010 38	Lyon	2–0	Le Mans	Lyon
21:00	Gomis 45'; Pjanić 68'	Report		Stadium: Stade de Gerland; Attendance: 37,353; Referee: Lionel Jaffredo

=== Coupe de France ===
Lyon will enter the 2009–10 Coupe de France season having won the title just two seasons ago. Lyon will start from the Round of 64, as all Ligue 1 clubs will. On 14 December 2009, the draw for the Round of 64 was determined and Lyon were giving the task of traveling to Alsace to face second division club Strasbourg. Lyon's first match of the 2010 winter season was highly anticipated by the media and supporters alike following the team's disastrous ending to 2009 portion of the campaign. Lyon started this game in fantastic fashion scoring two goals in the first 15 minutes with Bafétimbi Gomis getting the opener in the 11th minute and Bastos getting one three minutes later. Layon maintained the 2–0 until injury time in the first half when Nicolas Fauvergue netted a goal for his side. Within the first 15 minutes of the second half, Lyon struggled to maintain its first half mentality. Young Strasbourg striker Magaye Gueye tested Lloris on two occasions. Eventually, the match was put to bed after 71 minutes following a laser free kick from Bastos giving Lyon a 3–1 lead, which was the final result. In the ensuing draw, Lyon were given another tough test, courtesy of fellow Ligue 1 club AS Monaco. In the Round of 32 clash, Lyon opened the scoring through Jean-Alain Boumsong on the cusp of half-time with a thumping header following a corner kick. After half-time, Monaco's Brazilian striker Nenê equalised from the penalty spot seven minutes into the second period after Sidney Govou was adjudged to have fouled him in the penalty area. Despite maintaining consistency throughout the match, Lyon would suffer defeat and elimination from the competition following the conversion of a close-range header by South Korean Park Chu-young, following a cross, 13 minutes from time. The goal was partially attributed to goalkeeper Hugo Lloris' unwillingness to intercept the ball upon realizing a teammate was attempting to clear it himself. The former's unwillingness and the teammate's attempt at a clearance was both futile as Park headed the ball in easily.

==== Matches ====
9 January 2010 Round of 64	Strasbourg	1–3	Lyon	Strasbourg
20:00	Fauvergue 36'		Gomis 11'; Bastos 14', 72'	Stadium: Stade de la Meinau; Attendance: 11,000; Referee: Lionel Jaffredo

23 January 2010 Round of 32	Monaco	2–1	Lyon	Fontvieille
20:45	Nenê 51'; Park 78'		Boumsong 45'	Stadium: Stade Louis II; Attendance: 4,818; Referee: Phillipe Malige

=== Coupe de la Ligue ===
Lyon will enter Coupe de la Ligue season having last won the cup in 2001. Last season, they were eliminated in the Round of 16 by Metz. Lyon entered the competition during the Round of 16 phase. The draw was determined on 25 September and Lyon were pitted against Metz for the second straight season. Metz defeated Lyon 1–3 with goals from Romain Rocchi, Sébastien Renouard and Victor Mendy in last year's competition. Lyon marched into the Round of 16 match initially nervous before taking control of the match with a rare goal from Jérémy Toulalan, his first as a Lyon player and only the second of his football career. Lyon later got great chances from Michel Bastos and Yannis Tafer with the latter actually scoring, however he was determined to bee offsides by the linesman. Though, Metz maintained the 1–0 deep into the second half, the match was sealed following a brace from Lisandro López, which took only two minutes to complete. In the ensuing draw, held the day after their victory, Lyon were paired with Lorient, whom they will contested on the road at the Stade du Moustoir mid-week on 26 January. In the match, Lorient took a firm stance early courtesy of a goal from Kevin Gameiro in the fourth minute after the Lorient striker took advantage of a blunder by new signing Dejan Lovren. Despite having 86 minutes to either draw the match or win it, Lyon failed to get on the score-sheet despite capable chances from López, Bastos and Pjanić on several occasions and thus were eliminated from the competition for the ninth straight season.

==== Matches ====
13 January 2010 Round of 16	Lyon	3–0	Metz	Lyon
18:45	Toulalan 30'; López 87', 89'	Report	Marichez (red card) 68'	Stadium: Stade de Gerland; Attendance: 20,010; Referee: Damien Ledentu

26 January 2010 Quarter-finals	Lorient	1–0	Lyon	Lorient
17:00	Gameiro 5'	Report		Stadium: Stade du Moustoir; Attendance: 16,758; Referee: Olivier Thual

=== UEFA Champions League ===
==== Playoff round ====
Lyon entered the 2009–10 UEFA Champions League for the tenth-straight season. For the first time, however, they had to qualify in order to reach the group stage as they entered through the playoff round, due to their 3rd position finish last season. Clubs Lyon could have possibly encountered in the playoff round included Italian club Fiorentina, Spanish side Atlético Madrid and Scottish club Celtic. The draw was determined on 7 August and Lyon were given Belgian club Anderlecht as opponents. The first leg was played on 19 August at the Stade Gerland, while the second leg was played a week later at Constant Vanden Stock Stadium in Anderlecht. The winner entered the group stage of the UEFA Champions League.

19 August 2009 First leg	Lyon (France)	5–1	(Belgium) Anderlecht	Lyon, France
20:45	Pjanić 10'; López 15' (pen.); Bastos 39'; Gomis 42', 63'	Report	Suárez 58'	Stadium: Stade de Gerland; Attendance: 37,902; Referee: Wolfgang Stark (Germany)

25 August 2009 Second leg	Anderlecht (Belgium)	1–3 (2–8 agg.)	(France) Lyon	Anderlecht, Belgium
20:45	Suárez 51' (pen.)	Report	Lisandro 26', 32', 41'	Stadium: Constant Vanden Stock Stadium; Attendance: 16,096; Referee: Nicola Rizzoli (Italy)

In the opening leg, Lyon, at the onset, quickly forced a strong attacking pace into the game catching an unexpected Belgian side off guard. In just the 8th minute, Lyon were awarded a free kick and it was easily converted by Miralem Pjanić, his first ever goal with the club. The home side continued their attack forcing the Belgians to hold off their attack and focus more on defending. Despite Anderlecht's intent, in the 14th minute, Lyon were awarded a penalty by referee Wolfgang Stark after Lisandro López, on a breakaway, was taken down in the box by Anderlecht goalkeeper Silvio Proto. Having won the penalty, López stepped up to take it and converted giving Lyon a 2–0 lead in just 15 minutes of play. Throughout the first half, Lyon continued to control the match, at one point, having 65% of the possession. Their continued attack paid off with an amazing left-footed rocket shot from Michel Bastos in the 39th minute. Just three minutes later, Lyon converted again through Bafétimbi Gomis on an easy shot just in front of goal following a nice pass from López. The goal gave Lyon a 4–0 heading into the halftime. Lyon came out for the second half in completely opposite fashion compared to the first. This allowed Anderlecht to finally get some play on the ball. Just 14 minutes into the second half, Anderlecht got their first goal from the Argentine Matías Suárez, who beat both Mathieu Bodmer and Hugo Lloris to the ball and eventually pushed it into the back of the net. Just five minutes later, however, Lyon would regain their four-goal lead with Gomis scoring his second of the match following the Belgian goalkeeper Proto's mistake of leaving his net open by attempting to beat the Frenchman to a passing ball from Michel Bastos. Despite numerous chances from substitute César Delgado, Lyon could not add to their defining lead and headed to Brussels with a 5–1 aggregate lead.

In the second leg, Lyon decided to preserve their 5–1 aggregate lead by keeping the pace of the match slow, as well as holding possession as much as possible in order to keep Anderlecht, who were now playing at home, from getting an early goal. Eventually, this strategy paid off resulting in a goal from Lisandro following a rash mistake from an Anderlecht defender who, upon receiving the ball from the goalkeeper, made a pass directly into the path of the Argentine who rightfully intercepted it and easily chipped the ball over the unexpected goalkeeper to give Lyon a 1–0 lead and effectively end Anderlecht's chances. Six minutes later, Lisandro scored again, this time due to a great cross from Anthony Réveillère, who found the striker wide open inside the penalty box. Minutes before halftime, Lisandro scored his first career hat trick for the club in just his fourth match with them, converting the goal following a turnover from the Anderlecht midfielder Jan Polák. In the second half, Anderlecht converted from the penalty spot in the 51st minute and the 3–1 scoreline eventually remained until the end of the match. The victory allowed Lyon to advance to the group stages on an aggregate score of 8–2.

==== Group stage ====
The draw for the group stage of the Champions League was determined on 27 August 2009. Due to Arsenal's victory over Celtic in the third qualifying round, Lyon were inserted into Pot 2. Following the draw, Lyon were inserted into Group E with English club Liverpool from Pot 1, Italian side Fiorentina from Pot 3, and Hungarian club Debreceni VSC from Pot 4. Lyon have, previously, never faced Liverpool nor Debreceni in the Champions League, with the latter making their debut in the competition. However, Lyon have faced Fiorentina, whom they contested two matches against during last year's group stage. The first match, played at the Stade Gerland finished 2–2 in controversial fashion, while the second match away to Fiorentina was won by Lyon 2–1.

Lyon started their Champions League campaign with a 1–0 victory over Fiorentina. Fiorentina, who played most of the match with 10 men, due to a red card being given to Alberto Gilardino held on to a 0–0 draw until the 76th minute when the Bosnian midfielder Miralem Pjanić scored the opening goal and winning goal. The following match day, the club faced minnows Debrecen and came out with a 4–0. In the match, Lyon dominated the first half scoring three of their four goals in the first 25 minutes with Kim Källström, Pjanić, and Sidney Govou getting on the scoresheet. Bafétimbi Gomis capped the night scoring the final goal in the second half.

On 20 October Lyon began their back-to-back matches against Liverpool with the first match being played at the historic Anfield. Despite Lyon attacking early on, it was Liverpool who got scored first with Yossi Benayoun converting. In the 33rd minute, Lyon's lone healthy centre back Cris suffered a concussion and was taken off the field before half-time, despite an attempt to continue playing. He was replaced by defensive midfielder Maxime Gonalons. Due to this, Lyon employed a more defensive style earlier in the second half, but eventually garnered enough confidence to get forward and in the 72nd minute, it paid off. Following a corner kick from Källström, Lyon got two chances at goal from Jérémy Toulalan and Jean Makoun before the ball was headed in by the substitute Gonalons. The goal drew the match at 1–1 and Lyon later won the match in injury time with the Argentine César Delgado scoring the game-winning goal. The victory was Lyon's first victory over an English club in the Champions League. In the return leg, Lyon managed a 1–1 draw, primarily due to the efforts of goalkeeper Hugo Lloris who performed admirably producing sharp stops from Fernando Torres, Dirk Kuyt, and Andriy Voronin in the first half, then displaying stunning reflexes to deny the Brazilian Lucas midway through the second period. Though Lyon conceded late following an amazing goal from Ryan Babel, they drew the match 1–1 with a goal from Lisandro López in injury time. The point brought Lyon's total tally to ten and assured the club a spot in the knockout stage.

Lyon's effort to go into the knockout stage in first place were put into danger following their 0–1 defeat to Fiorentina at the Stadio Artemio Franchi in Florence. Lyon contested the match missing several key players, notably starters Jérémy Toulalan and Anthony Réveillère. Despite outshooting and holding 57% of the possession, Lyon failed to get on the score-sheet and conceded from the penalty spot after referee Olegário Benquerença ruled that Aly Cissokho had committed a foul on Marco Marchionni inside of the box. The penalty was converted sublimely by Juan Manuel Vargas. The loss moved Fiorentina into the first place and ultimately the battle for top spot in the group was decided on the final day. Lyon faced Debrecen and like the first match, Lyon attacked early and by the end of the first half led 2–0 with goals from Bastos and Gomis. In the second half, Lyon increased their performance getting a free kick goal from Pjanić and also one from Cissokho, which was his first professional goal. During the final minutes of the match, Lyon's support was high and ecstatic, mainly due to the Liverpool–Fiorentina match being drawn at that point, their hearts were broken following a goal from Alberto Gilardino in injury time to give Fiorentina a 2–1 victory and top spot in the group. The 4–0 thrashing of Debrecen was deemed futile.

Pos	Team	Pld	W	D	L	GF	GA	GD	Pts	Qualification
1	(Italy) Fiorentina	6	5	0	1	14	7	+7	15	Advance to knockout phase
2	(France) Lyon	6	4	1	1	12	3	+9	13	Advance to knockout phase
3	(England) Liverpool	6	2	1	3	5	7	−2	7	Transfer to Europa League
4	(Hungary) Debrecen	6	0	0	6	5	19	−14	0	

Source: RSSSF

Round	1	2	3	4	5	6
Ground	H	A	A	H	A	H
Result	W	W	W	D	L	W

Source: uefa.com
A = Away; H = Home; W = Win; D = Draw; L = Loss

===== Matches =====
16 September 2009 1	Lyon (France)	1–0	(Italy) Fiorentina	Lyon, France
20:45	Pjanić 76'	Report	Gilardino (red card) 45'	Stadium: Stade de Gerland; Attendance: 37,169; Referee: Pieter Vink (Netherlands)

29 September 2009 2	Debrecen (Hungary)	0–4	(France) Lyon	Budapest, Hungary
20:45		Report	Källström 3'; Pjanić 13'; Govou 24'; Gomis 51'	Stadium: Ferenc Puskás Stadium^{1} Attendance: 41,600; Referee: Tom Henning Øvrebø (Norway)

20 October 2009 3	Liverpool (England)	1–2	(France) Lyon	Liverpool, England
20:45	Benayoun 41'	Report	Gonalons 72'; Delgado 90+1'	Stadium: Anfield; Attendance: 41,562; Referee: Alberto Undiano Mallenco (Spain)

4 November 2009 4	Lyon (France)	1–1	(England) Liverpool	Lyon, France
20:45	Lisandro 90'	Report	Babel 83'	Stadium: Stade de Gerland; Attendance: 39,180; Referee: Frank De Bleeckere (Belgium)

24 November 2009 5	Fiorentina (Italy)	1–0	(France) Lyon	Florence, Italy
20:45	Vargas 28' (pen.)	Report		Stadium: Stadio Artemio Franchi; Attendance: 34,301; Referee: Olegário Benquerença (Portugal)

9 December 2009 6	Lyon (France)	4–0	(Hungary) Debrecen	Lyon, France
20:45	Gomis 25'; Bastos 45'; Pjanić 59'; Cissokho 76'	Report		Stadium: Stade de Gerland; Attendance: 36,884; Referee: Florian Meyer (Germany)

- Note 1: Debrecen played their home group matches at Ferenc Puskás Stadium in Budapest as their Stadion Oláh Gábor Út did not meet UEFA criteria.

==== First Knockout Round ====
For the seventh straight season, Lyon reached the first knockout round. Due to finishing second, Lyon faced the danger of being paired with several big clubs that finished first in other groups. Notable clubs Lyon could have been paired with include Barcelona, Manchester United, Chelsea, and Arsenal to name a few. Following the draw, held on 18 December 2009, Lyon indeed received a tough draw being given La Liga side Real Madrid. The draw meant that former Lyon player Karim Benzema returned to the Stade de Gerland after leaving the club only six months prior. This was the second straight season Lyon faced a Spanish club in the first knockout round having lost 3–6 on aggregate to Barcelona in last season's competition. The first leg was played at the Gerland on 16 February 2010, while the second leg was held at the Santiago Bernabéu Stadium on 10 March.

16 February 2010 First leg	Lyon (France)	1–0	(Spain) Real Madrid	Lyon, France
20:45 CET (UTC+01:00)	Makoun 47'	Report		Stadium: Stade de Gerland; Attendance: 40,327; Referee: Martin Atkinson (England)

10 March 2010 Second leg	Real Madrid (Spain)	1–1 (1–2 agg.)	(France) Lyon	Madrid, Spain
20:45 CET (UTC+01:00)	Ronaldo 6'	Report	Pjanić 75'	Stadium: Santiago Bernabéu Stadium; Attendance: 71,569; Referee: Nicola Rizzoli (Italy)

==== Quarter-finals ====
Following their successful 2–1 aggregate victory over Real Madrid, Lyon were inserted into the quarter-finals. The draw was conducted on 19 March and Lyon were drawn to face Ligue 1 rivals and fellow French club Bordeaux. On 30 March 2010, Lyon faced Bordeaux at the Stade de Gerland in the first leg of the competition. Lyon got on the scoreboard early through a goal through Lisandro López following a blunder from Bordeaux defender Michaël Ciani, which allowed Mathieu Bodmer to recover the ball inside the box and find López in front of goal. Undeterred, Bordeaux quickly leveled with a vital away goal from striker Marouane Chamakh after great service from Yoann Gourcuff. In the 32nd minute, Lyon again took the lead with Michel Bastos scoring following another Bordeaux error, this time from Benoît Trémoulinas who misplayed a Lyon cross, which allowed the ball to land at the feet of Bastos who proceeded to blast a shot past goalkeeper Cédric Carrasso. Midway through the second half, Laurent Blanc's team rallied with the Brazilian Wendel drilling a shot on goal, which went by Hugo Lloris, but went directly off the post. Minutes later, Lyon were awarded a penalty courtesy of a Matthieu Chalmé handball. The penalty was converted by Lisandro to give Lyon a 3–1 lead and the Argentine was later carded in the final minutes of the match, which resulted in him missing the second leg. The 3–1 scoreline remained ensuring Lyon a wonderful opportunity to reach their first ever UEFA Champions League semi-final.

In the second leg in Bordeaux, Claude Puel opted for a more defensive formation starting Maxime Gonalons ahead of the attack-minded Miralem Pjanić. The strategy was successful during the early stages but turned sour following an accurate shot from midfielder Alou Diarra, which again beat Lloris, but, for the second straight match, hit the post in the 43rd minute. Two minutes later, just before halftime, Bordeaux drew within one goal following a conversion from Chamakh. In the second half, Puel remained confident in defense opting to substitute out attacker and lone striker Bafétimbi Gomis in order to clog the midfield. In the final stages of the match, Bordeaux were near the game-winning goal following a header attempt by Wendel, but their hopes were spoiled following an amazing save from Lloris. Though Bordeaux were successful in attaining a victory, the 3–2 aggregate scoreline was in Lyon's favor allowing the club to advance to their first-ever UEFA Champions League semi-final.

30 March 2010 First leg	Lyon (France)	3–1	(France) Bordeaux	Lyon, France
20:45	Lisandro 10', 77' (pen.); Bastos 32'	Report	Chamakh 14'	Stadium: Stade de Gerland; Attendance: 37,859; Referee: Felix Brych (Germany)

7 April 2010 Second leg	Bordeaux (France)	1–0 (2–3 agg.)	(France) Lyon	Bordeaux, France
20:45	Chamakh 45'	Report		Stadium: Stade Chaban-Delmas; Attendance: 31,962; Referee: Alberto Undiano Mallenco (Spain)

==== Semi-finals ====
Lyon will be making their first-ever UEFA Champions League semi-final appearance following their 3–2 aggregate victory over French rivals Bordeaux. Following the quarter-final draw, the winner of the match were pitted to either face English club Manchester United or German club Bayern Munich. On 7 April 2010, Bayern Munich lost to Manchester United 3–2 at Old Trafford, but their 2–1 result in the previous leg in Munich allowed Bayern to advance to the semi-finals to face Lyon on the away goals rule.

Lyon and Bayern Munich have met recently. During the 2008–09 UEFA Champions League, the two clubs were inserted into the same group for the group stage phase of the competition. In the first match, played at the Allianz Arena, the clubs drew 1–1 with Martín Demichelis converting an own goal for Lyon and Zé Roberto equalising for Bayern early in the second half. In the second match in Lyon, Bayern defeated Lyon 3–2 with Frenchman Franck Ribéry being particularly instrumental in the victory assisting on two goals and also scoring one.

21 April 2010 First leg	Bayern Munich (Germany)	1–0	(France) Lyon	Munich, Germany
20:45	Ribéry (red card) 37'; Robben 69'	Report	Toulalan (yellow card) 51' (yellow-red card) 54'	Stadium: Allianz Arena; Attendance: 66,000; Referee: Roberto Rosetti (Italy)

27 April 2010 Second leg	Lyon (France)	0–3 (0–4 agg.)	(Germany) Bayern Munich	Lyon, France
20:45	Cris (yellow card) 59' (yellow-red card) 59'	Report	Olić 26', 67', 78'	Stadium: Stade de Gerland; Attendance: 39,414; Referee: Massimo Busacca (Switzerland)

== Start formations ==
Qnt	Formation	Match(es)
36	4-3-3	L1 (24), UCL (9), CDF (1), CDL (2)
17	4-2-3-1	L1 (12), UCL (4), CDF (1)
3	4-4-2	L1 (2), UCL (1)

Last updated: 15 May
Source: Match reports in Competitive matches
Only competitive matches.

=== Starting 11 ===
Lineup that started in the club's league match
against Le Mans on 15 May.

No.	Pos.	Nat.	Name	MS	Notes
1	GK	(France)	Lloris	52	
13	RB	(France)	Réveillère	46	
3	CB	(Brazil)	Cris	47	
28	CB	(France)	Toulalan	43	
20	LB	(France)	Cissokho	46	
17	CM	(Cameroon)	Makoun	36	
8	CM	(Bosnia and Herzegovina)	Pjanić	38	
6	CM	(Sweden)	Källström	38	
14	RW	(France)	Govou	32	
9	LW	(Argentina)	Lisandro	39	
18	FW	(France)	Gomis	31	

Last updated: 15 May
Source: Squad stats and Start formations.
Only competitive matches.
Using the most used start formation.
Ordered by position on pitch (from back right to front left).

== Squad stats ==
=== Appearances and goals ===
Last updated on 15 May 2010.

No.	Pos	Nat	Player	Total		Ligue 1		Champions League		Coupe de la Ligue		Coupe de France	
No.	Pos	Nat	Player	Apps	Goals	Apps	Goals	Apps	Goals	Apps	Goals	Apps	Goals
1	GK	(France) FRA	Hugo Lloris	52	0	36	0	14	0	0	0	2	0
2	DF	(France) FRA	François Clerc	8	0	7	0	1	0	0	0	0	0
3	DF	(Brazil) BRA	Cris	50	4	34	4	14	0	1	0	1	0
4	DF	(France) FRA	Jean-Alain Boumsong	29	2	19	1	6	0	2	0	2	1
5	MF	(France) FRA	Mathieu Bodmer	18	1	13	1	4	0	0	0	1	0
6	MF	(Sweden) SWE	Kim Källström	47	5	32	4	13	1	0	0	2	0
7	MF	(Brazil) BRA	Michel Bastos	47	15	32	10	11	3	2	0	2	2
8	MF	(Bosnia and Herzegovina) BIH	Miralem Pjanić	53	11	37	6	14	5	2	0	0	0
9	FW	(Argentina) ARG	Lisandro López	50	24	34	15	12	7	2	2	2	0
10	MF	(Brazil) BRA	Ederson	37	2	24	2	10	0	1	0	2	0
12	DF	(France) FRA	Timothée Kolodziejczak	3	0	2	0	1	0	0	0	0	0
13	DF	(France) FRA	Anthony Réveillère	47	0	30	0	13	0	2	0	2	0
14	FW	(France) FRA	Sidney Govou	43	3	30	2	11	1	1	0	1	0
17	MF	(Cameroon) CMR	Jean Makoun	40	2	28	1	12	1	0	0	0	0
18	FW	(France) FRA	Bafétimbi Gomis	50	16	37	10	9	5	2	0	2	1
19	FW	(Argentina) ARG	César Delgado	44	5	27	4	13	1	2	0	2	0
20	DF	(France) FRA	Aly Cissokho	48	1	31	0	14	1	2	0	1	0
22	MF	(France) FRA	Clément Grenier	3	0	3	0	0	0	0	0	0	0
23	DF	(Brazil) BRA	Anderson	0	0	0	0	0	0	0	0	0	0
25	GK	(France) FRA	Joan Hartock	0	0	0	0	0	0	0	0	0	0
26	DF	(Croatia) CRO	Dejan Lovren	10	0	8	0	0	0	1	0	1	0
28	MF	(France) FRA	Jérémy Toulalan	45	1	31	0	11	0	2	1	1	0
29	FW	(France) FRA	Yannis Tafer	11	1	7	1	0	0	2	0	2	0
30	GK	(France) FRA	Rémy Vercoutre	4	0	2	0	0	0	2	0	0	0
31	MF	(France) FRA	Saïd Mehamha	0	0	0	0	0	0	0	0	0	0
32	DF	(France) FRA	Lamine Gassama	9	0	6	0	2	0	0	0	1	0
34	MF	(France) FRA	Enzo Reale	0	0	0	0	0	0	0	0	0	0
35	DF	(France) FRA	Nicolas Seguin	0	0	0	0	0	0	0	0	0	0
36	DF	(France) FRA	Sébastien Faure	0	0	0	0	0	0	0	0	0	0
37	DF	(France) FRA	Thomas Fontaine	0	0	0	0	0	0	0	0	0	0
38	FW	(France) FRA	Alexandre Lacazette	1	0	1	0	0	0	0	0	0	0
39	FW	(France) FRA	Ishak Belfodil	4	0	3	0	1	0	0	0	0	0
40	GK	(France) FRA	Anthony Lopes	0	0	0	0	0	0	0	0	0	0
41	MF	(France) FRA	Maxime Gonalons	27	2	15	1	9	1	2	0	1	0
44	DF	(Senegal) SEN	Ousmane N'Diaye	0	0	0	0	0	0	0	0	0	0
46	DF	(France) FRA	Loïc Abenzoar	0	0	0	0	0	0	0	0	0	0
Players sold after the start of the season:
11	DF	(Italy) ITA	Fabio Grosso	1	0	1	0	0	0	0	0	0	0
24	MF	(France) FRA	Romain Beynié	0	0	0	0	0	0	0	0	0	0
27	FW	(France) FRA	Anthony Mounier	1	0	1	0	0	0	0	0	0	0

=== Other statistics ===
Last updated 15 May 2010

Note: For all official competitions

No.	Pos.	Nationality	Player	Assists	Minutes Played	Yellow card	Yellow card Red card	Red card
1	GK	France	Hugo Lloris	1	4590	0	0	0
2	DF	France	François Clerc	0	557	2	0	0
3	DF	Brazil	Cris	1	3972	11	1	0
4	DF	France	Jean-Alain Boumsong	0	2322	1	0	0
5	MF	France	Mathieu Bodmer	2	1032	3	0	0
6	MF	Sweden	Kim Källström	6	3152	5	0	0
7	MF	Brazil	Michel Bastos	5	2703	3	0	0
8	MF	Bosnia and Herzegovina	Miralem Pjanić	9	3173	5	0	0
9	FW	Argentina	Lisandro López	5	3236	5	0	0
10	MF	Brazil	Ederson	5	1665	1	0	0
12	DF	France	Timothée Kolodziejczak	0	101	0	0	0
13	DF	France	Anthony Réveillère	1	3724	6	0	1
14	FW	France	Sidney Govou	4	2416	8	0	0
17	DF	Cameroon	Jean Makoun	2	3010	5	1	0
18	FW	France	Bafétimbi Gomis	4	2665	2	0	0
19	MF	Argentina	César Delgado	3	2004	4	0	0
20	DF	France	Aly Cissokho	1	3768	7	0	0
22	MF	France	Clément Grenier	0	18	0	0	0
23	DF	Brazil	Anderson	0	0	0	0	0
25	GK	France	Joan Hartock	0	0	0	0	0
26	DF	Croatia	Dejan Lovren	1	770	1	0	0
28	MF	France	Jérémy Toulalan	2	3150	9	1	0
29	FW	France	Yannis Tafer	0	330	1	0	0
30	GK	France	Rémy Vercoutre	0	270	0	0	0
31	MF	France	Saïd Mehamha	0	0	0	0	0
32	DF	France	Lamine Gassama	0	643	0	0	0
34	MF	France	Enzo Reale	0	0	0	0	0
35	DF	France	Nicolas Seguin	0	0	0	0	0
36	DF	France	Sébastien Faure	0	0	0	0	0
37	DF	France	Thomas Fontaine	0	0	0	0	0
38	FW	France	Alexandre Lacazette	0	12	0	0	0
39	FW	France	Ishak Belfodil	0	55	0	0	0
40	GK	France	Anthony Lopes	0	0	0	0	0
41	MF	France	Maxime Gonalons	0	1690	7	1	0
44	DF	Senegal	Ousmane N'Diaye	0	0	0	0	0
46	DF	France	Loïc Abenzoar	0	0	0	0	0

Last updated: 27 April 2010
Source: Competitive matches and lfp.fr
Only competitive matches
(yellow card) = Number of bookings; (second yellow card) = Number of sending offs after a second yellow card; (red card) = Number of sending offs by a direct red card..
