= Jean Makoun =

Cameroonian footballer (born 1983)

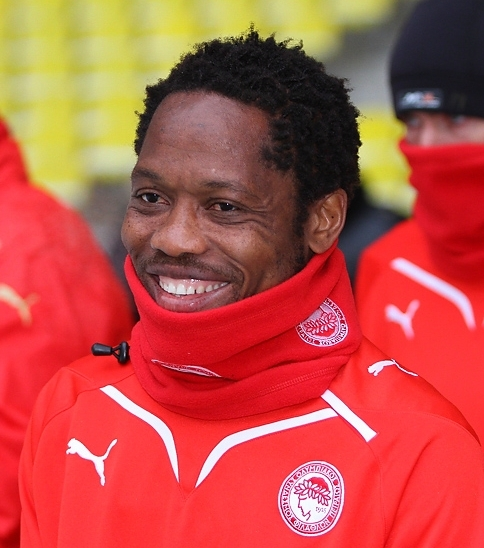
- Makoun with Olympiacos in 2012

Personal information
- Full name: Jean II Makoun
- Date of birth: 29 May 1983 (age 43)
- Place of birth: Yaoundé, Cameroon
- Height: 1.73 m (5 ft 8 in)
- Position: Midfielder

Youth career
- 1997–1999: Cotonsport Garoua
- 2000: Jeunesse Star
- 2001: Tonnerre Yaoundé

Senior career*
| Years | Team | Apps | (Gls) |
| 2001–2008 | Lille | 165 | (9) |
| 2008–2011 | Lyon | 76 | (8) |
| 2011–2013 | Aston Villa | 9 | (0) |
| 2011–2012 | → Olympiacos (loan) | 23 | (2) |
| 2012–2013 | → Stade Rennais (loan) | 28 | (2) |
| 2013–2015 | Stade Rennais | 59 | (3) |
| 2015–2017 | Antalyaspor | 33 | (4) |
| 2018–2020 | Merit Alsancak Yesilova SK | 25 | (6) |
| Total | | 418 | (34) |

International career
| 2003–2014 | Cameroon | 68 | (10) |
Medal record
Men's football
Representing Cameroon
Africa Cup of Nations
| Runner-up | 2008 Ghana |
- * Club domestic league appearances and goals

Jean II Makoun (French pronunciation: [ʒɑ̃ dø mɑkun]; born 29 May 1983) is a Cameroonian former professional footballer who played as a midfielder. He played for the Cameroon national team from 2003 to 2015.

== Club career ==
=== Lille ===
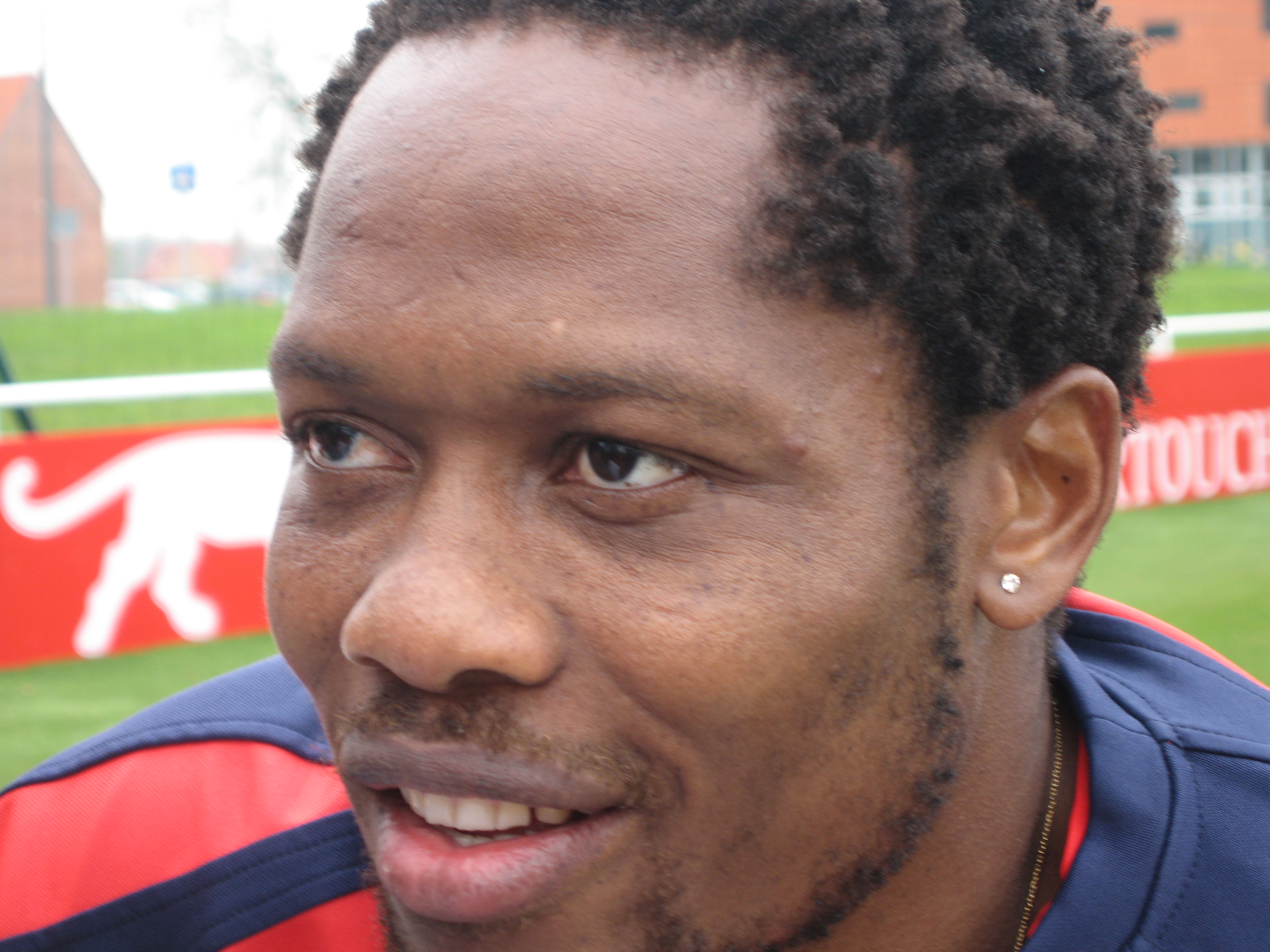
Makoun during his time with Lille.

Born in Yaoundé, Cameroon, Makoun began his career in his native Cameroon at Cotonsport Garoua, where he was part of the team's youth setup. Following this, he spent time at other Cameroonian clubs Jeunesse Star and Tonnerre Yaoundé, before moving to France, to join Ligue 1 club Lille. Makoun started out playing in the centre–back position but when he was at Lille, Makoun began playing in the centre–back position. Having progressed through the ranks of Lille youth system, he signed his professional contract, keeping him until 2006.

Makoun was called up to the first team by Manager Claude Puel during the 2002–03 season. He made his Lille debut, coming on as a 63rd-minute substitute, in a 1–0 loss against SC Bastia on 2 November 2002. Makoun made his first start for the side, starting the whole game, in a 2–0 loss against OGC Nice on 10 January 2003. At the end of the 2002–03 season, he went on to make thirteen appearances in all competitions.

At the start of the 2003–04 season, Makoun scored his first goal for the club, as they beat the defending champion, Lyon, to win 1–0. He quickly became a first team regular for the side under the management of Puel, who was impressed with his quality performance. As the season progressed, Makoun began to develop for the side by displaying "good technique and a lucidity which regularly allows him to play his role as a passer." On 31 October 2003, Makoun scored his first goal of the season, in a 2–0 win against Nîmes Olympique in the second round of the Coupe de la Ligue. Two months later on 17 December 2003, he scored his second goal of the season, in a 3–2 loss against Saint-Étienne in the last 16 of the Coupe de la Ligue. At the end of the 2003–04 season, Makoun went on to make thirty–four appearances and scoring three times in all competitions.

At the start of the 2004–05 season, Makoun continued to regain his first team place, playing in the midfield position. Makoun started the season well when he helped Lille win the UEFA Intertoto Cup after beating U.D. Leiria 2–0 on aggregate. On 21 December 2004, Makoun scored his first goal of the season against Strasbourg Alsace in the third round of the Coupe de la Ligue, as Lille lost 4–2 in penalty shootout following a 1–1 draw. However, during a 0–0 draw against Sochaux on 5 February 2005, he suffered a knee injury in the 6th minute, resulting in his substitution and was sidelined for a month. On 20 March 2005, Makoun returned to the starting line–up against Saint-Étienne, as he helped the side draw 0–0. At the end of the 2004–05 season, he went on to make forty–seven appearances and scoring once in all competitions. Reflecting to the 2004–05 season, Makoun said: "I had a great season. If I drew the attention of France-Foot journalists, it is because I have been very consistent. My club, Lille, was aligned on several fronts. We started our season with the Inter-toto cup. After this stage, we were eliminated at the quarter-final stage of the Uefa Cup by Auxerre. In the league, we finished in second place, a position that directly qualifies us for the next Champions League. Unfortunately, for the two trophies competing in France, our journey was not very brilliant".

At the start of the 2005–06 season, Makoun started the season well when he scored his first goal of the season, in a 3–3 draw against AC Ajaccio on 8 August 2005. Makoun continued to regain his first team place, playing in the midfield position. His second goal for the side came on 17 September 2005, in a 4–0 win against OGC Nice. A month later on 22 October 2005, he scored his third goal of the season, in a 2–0 win against FC Nantes. His performance against Manchester United in the UEFA Champions League earned him praises from the British media. After spending January with his international duty, Makoun returned to the first team, starting the whole game, in a 0–0 draw against Paris Saint-Germain on 12 February 2006. However, he was then sent–off for a straight red card in the 50th minute, in a 1–0 win against AS Monaco on 26 February 2006. After serving a one match, Makoun returned to the starting line–up on 9 March 2006, helping the side win 1–0 against Sevilla in the first leg of the UEFA Cup. Two weeks later on 25 March 2006, he made his 100th appearance for the side, in a 2–2 draw against Strasbourg. On 6 May 2006, Makoun scored his fourth goal of the season, in a 4–0 win against Lyon. As a result, the win saw the club qualify for the UEFA Champions League next season. At the end of the 2005–06 season, he went on to make forty–three appearances and scoring four times in all competitions.

Ahead of the 2006–07 season, Makoun was linked a move away from Lille over the summer, but he made it clear of staying at the club. Makoun continued to regain his first team place, playing in the midfield position. He then helped the side qualify for the UEFA Champions League Group after beating FK Rabotnički 4–0 on aggregate in both legs. It was announced on 10 October 2006 that Makoun signed a contract extension with the club, keeping him until 2011. Four days later on 14 October 2006, he set up the club's equalising goal, in a 1–1 draw against Troyes. Three days later on 17 October 2006, Makoun scored his first goal of the game, in a 3–1 win against AEK Athens. Three months later on 24 January 2007, he scored his second goal of the game, in a 1–0 win against Paris Saint-Germain. Despite being sidelined on four occasions during the 2006–07 season, Makoun made forty–five appearances and scoring two times in all competitions.

Having missed the opening game of the season, Makoun made his first appearance of the 2007–08 season, starting the whole game, in a 2–1 win against Metz on 12 August 2007. Two weeks later on 26 August 2007, he scored his first goal of the season, in a 1–1 draw against Paris Saint-Germain. Since the start of the 2007–08 season, Makoun started in the next eleven league matches before being sidelined with an abdominal wall. On 24 November 2007, he returned to the starting line–up, as Lille lost 2–0 against AS Nancy. After being sidelined due to his international commitment with Cameroon, Makoun returned to the starting line–up, starting the whole game, in a 0–0 draw against Valenciennes on 8 March 2008. He then regained his first team place for the rest of the 2007–08 season. On 20 April 2008, Makoun scored his second goal of the season, in a 3–1 win against Marseille. At the end of the 2007–08 season, he went on to make twenty–seven appearances and scoring two times in all competitions.

Following this, Makoun's performances attracted interest from clubs around Europe, including Premier League clubs Arsenal and Tottenham Hotspur, as well as Serie A club Juventus, and French clubs AS Monaco, Marseille, and Lyon. He became a firm fixture in the Lille side, making more than 150 appearances for the team in the league, and playing UEFA Champions League football. Upon leaving the club, Lille pay tribute to him, praising his courage, commitment and his loyalty.

=== Lyon ===
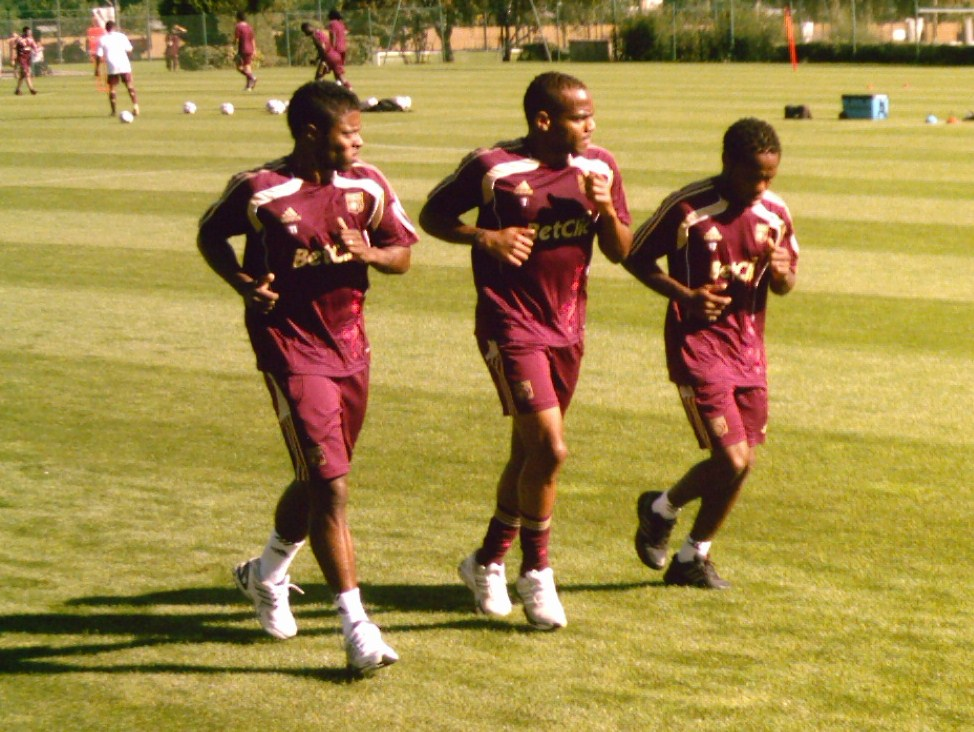
Makoun (third right) jogging, along with Michel Bastos and Jimmy Briand at Lyon, during the club's training sessions.

On 16 June 2008, Makoun signed with seven-time French champions Lyon on a four-year contract, where he re–joined Manager Claude Puel shortly after. The fee was worth €14 million with Lille set to receive another €1 million based on incentives. During his time with Lyon, Makoun wore the number 17 shirt, which was retired in 2003 after the death of Cameroonian midfielder Marc-Vivien Foé. Makoun, also from Cameroon and a native of Yaoundé, stated on wearing the number: "In memory of Marc, for me and for the whole Cameroon, this will be for something."

Makoun started well on his debut for Olympique Lyonnais when he scored the club's first goal of the season, in a 3–0 win over Toulouse. Two weeks later on 23 August 2008, Makoun scored his second goal of the game, in a 2–0 win against Grenoble Foot. Since making his debut for Olympique Lyonnais, he quickly established himself in the starting eleven for the side, playing in the midfield position. In a UEFA Champions League match against Steaua Bucharest, Makoun set up the club's first goal of the game when they were 2–1, as they made a comeback with a 5–2 win. A month later on 25 November 2008, he scored his first UEFA Champions League goal, in a 2–1 win against Fiorentina. He then scored two goals in two matches between 8 February 2009 and 15 February 2009 against Nice and Le Havre (which he also made a double assist during the match). Makoun scored two more goals in March, scoring against his former club, Lille in the round of 16 of Coupe de France, which Lyon lost 3–2 and Barcelona in the last-sixteen second leg of the UEFA Champions League, which Lyon lost 5–2. Two months later on 12 May 2009, he scored twice for the side, as they won 3–0 against FC Nantes. At the end of the 2008–09 season, Makoun made forty–six appearances and scoring ten times in all competitions.

At the start of the 2009–10 season, Makoun continued to regain his first team place, playing in the midfield position. He then scored his first goal of the season, in a 3–0 win against AJ Auxerre on 22 August 2009. This was followed up by setting up the club's third goal of the game, in a 3–1 win against AS Nancy. Makoun then helped the side qualify for the UEFA Champions League Group after beating Anderlecht 8–2 on aggregate. However, he was often inconsistent in midfield, which was subjected to criticism from Lyon fans and demands Makoun to leave the club, despite having played regularly. Nevertheless, Makoun set up a goal for Lisandro López, in a 5–5 draw against rivals, Marseille on 8 November 2009. Makoun then helped the club qualify for the knockout stage with thirteen points in the group stage, finishing in second place. However, he received a red card after a second bookable offence in a 0–0 draw against Toulouse on 7 February 2010. Amid to suspension, Makoun scored the only goal in Lyon's first leg UEFA Champions League knockout round win over Real Madrid at Stade Gerland by hitting a looping shot from 25 yards out over the head of goalkeeper Iker Casillas and into the top corner of the net in the 47th minute. After the match, Makoun said his goal 'delighted' him. Eventually, Lyon went through to the next stage in the Champions League after a 1–1 draw in a second leg. However, Lyon was eliminated in the semi–finals in the UEFA Champions League after losing 4–0 against Bayern Munich on aggregate. Despite being sidelined on three occasions later in the 2009–10 season, he made forty–one appearances and scoring two times in all competitions.

Makoun made his first appearance of the 2010–11 season, starting the whole game, in a 3–2 loss against SM Caen on 15 August 2010. In a follow-up match against Stade Brestois 29, he scored his first goal of the season, in a 1–0 win. Makoun then set up two goals, in a 3–1 win against Lens on 21 November 2010. However, his third season at Lyon was more even difficult for him, as he suffered a thigh injury and endured an up and down as he experiencing peaks and troughs aplenty. Even worse when he struggled to hold down a regular first-team place. Makoun spoke out, saying that he might leave the club for a fresh start. By the time Makoun departed Olympique Lyonnais, he made seventeen appearances and scoring once in all competitions.

=== Aston Villa ===
On 12 January 2011, Lyon revealed via their official website that Makoun had travelled to England in order to discuss a possible move to Premier League club Aston Villa, managed by former Lyon boss Gérard Houllier. Three days later, on 15 January 2011, Aston Villa completed the signing of Makoun on a three-and-a-half-year deal for an undisclosed fee believed to be in the region of £6.2m. On 21 January 2011, Villa and Makoun were handed international clearance and a work permit, with this announcement it was also revealed that he would take over the number 17 shirt from fellow West African Moustapha Salifou.

He made his Premier League debut for Aston Villa in an away match against Wigan Athletic at the DW Stadium on 25 January 2011 in a 2–1 win. However, on 12 February 2011, Makoun was sent off after receiving a straight red card for a tackle on Blackpool's DJ Campbell, as they drew 1–1. After a match, Makoun received a three match ban. Upon his return from suspension, Makoun spoken out, saying that he was shocked to believe the length of his suspension. Makoun made his return in a 0–1 defeat against Wolverhampton Wanderers on 19 March 2011. However, he began to find himself behind the pecking order in midfield position and never played for the club for the rest of the 2010–11 season. At the end of the 2010–11 season, Makoun made eight appearances for the side in all competitions.

Following the departure of Houllier, Makoun struggled to hold down a first-team position at Villa Park. His first and only appearance of the 2011–12 season came in a 2–0 League Cup victory over Hereford United on 23 August 2011. After his work permit was delayed, he left Aston Villa at the end of the 2012–13 season, with Rennes deciding to make his loan move permanent for an undisclosed amount.

==== Loan to Olympiacos ====
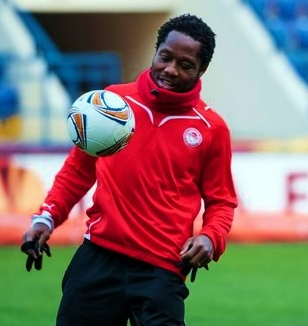
Makoun about to do kick up during training at his time at Olympiacos.

On 28 August 2011, Makoun joined the Greek club Olympiacos on a season-long loan deal. Upon joining the club, he chose the number 77 for his shirt.

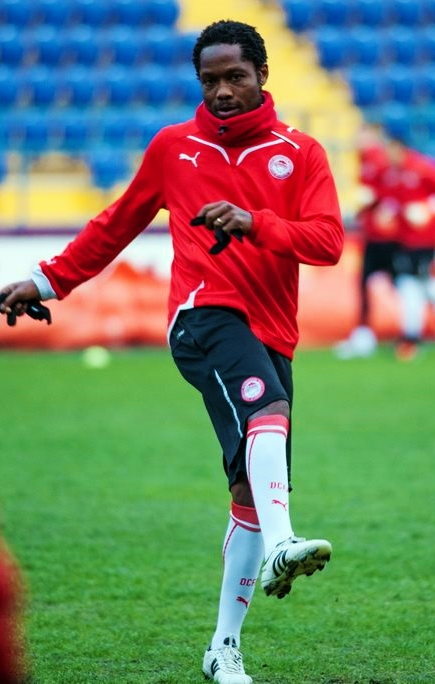
Makoun after kicking a ball during training at his time at Olympiacos.

Makoun made his Olympiacos debut, coming on as a substitute in the 67th minute, in a 1–0 loss to Marseille in the UEFA Champions League Group Stage march on 13 September 2011. Five days later on 18 September 2011, he made his league debut five days later, coming on as a substitute in the 69th minute, in a 2–1 win over Skoda Xanthi. Since making his debut at Olympiacos, Makoun established himself in the first team, playing in the midfield position. On 5 November 2011, he scored his first goal for Olympiacos against Aris in a 3–2 away win. However, in a follow up match against bitter rivals Panathinaikos, Makoun suffered a knee injury, resulting in his substitution and was that kept him out for six to eight weeks. On 4 January 2012, he returned to the first team from injury, coming on as a second-half substitute, in a 1–0 win against Atromitos. A month later on 19 February 2012, Makoun scored his second goal for the club, in a 2–0 home win against Panionios He then played a role, assisting two goals in each two matches between 25 March 2012 and 1 April 2012 against Asteras Tripolis and Panetolikos (which a victory against them saw the club become the league champions for the second time in a row). Makoun started in the Greek Football Cup Final against Atromitos and played 82 minutes before being substituted, as Olympiacos won 2–1 after playing at extra time. Having made thirty appearances and scoring two times in all competitions, Makoun returned to Aston Villa after Olympiacos didn't have a budget to sign him on a permanent basis. He spoke about his time at Olympiacos, saying: "I think I've had a good season. I took a lot of time to participate, I won titles. It was a good experience in Greece, in a great team and a really impressive atmosphere. I am very happy with what the team has achieved and I personally. I always want to play well and win titles. Of course, along the way you can have your ups and downs. When you belong to Olympiakos, you always want to win, for the team you represent and its history."

=== Rennes ===
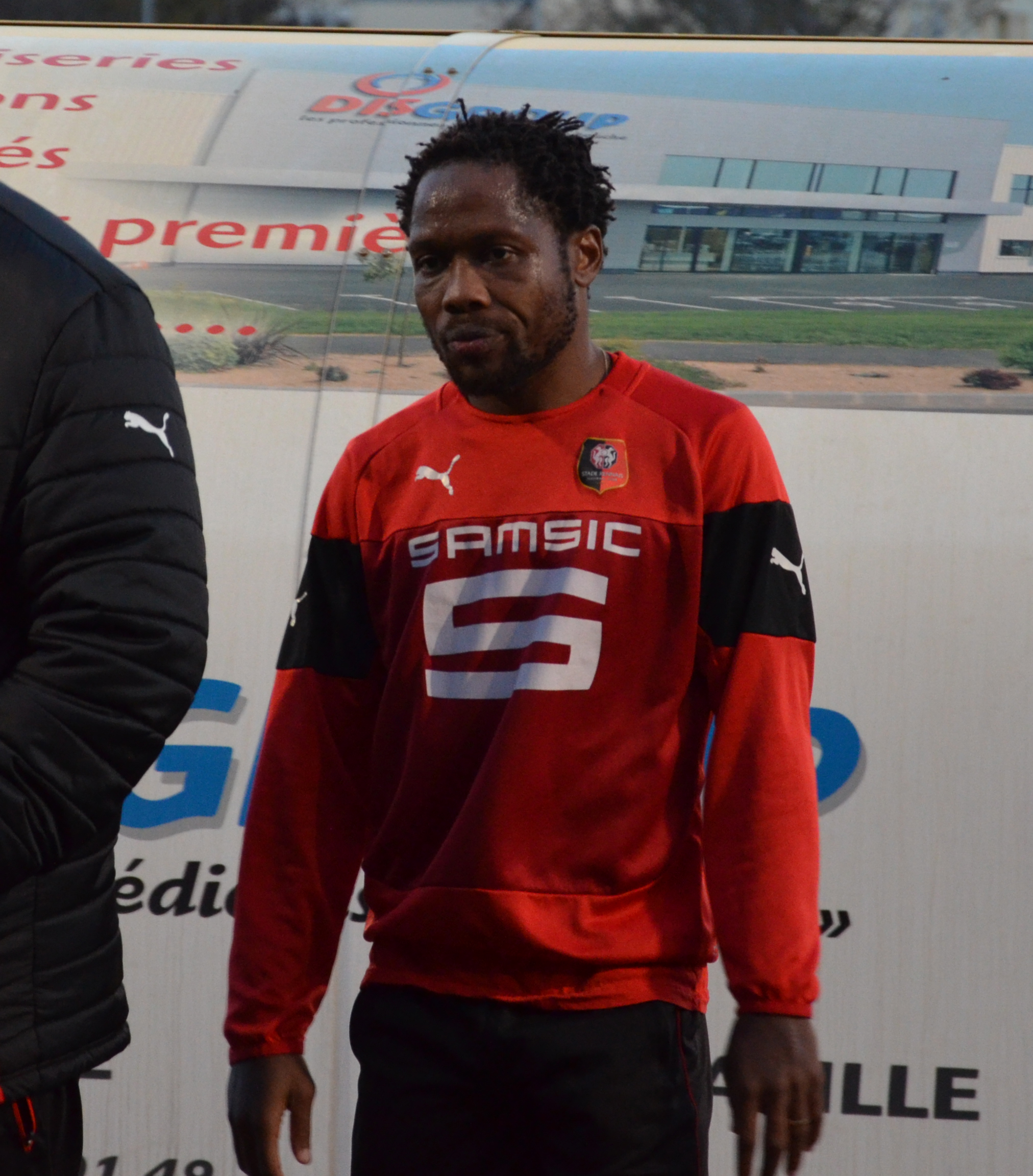
Makoun warming up prior to a match in 2014.

On 25 August 2012, it was announced that Makoun is to go on loan to French side Rennes for the rest of the 2012–13 season. It came after when new Aston Villa manager Paul Lambert made it clear that Makoun is not part of his plans for the upcoming season.

Makoun made his first appearance return for the club, starting the whole game, in a 2–1 loss against Lorient on 16 September 2012. A month later on 20 October 2012, Makoun scored his first goal, since his return to the club, in a 2–1 win over champions Montpellier. After the match, he was named Man of the Match by the club's supporters. Since making his debut for Stade Rennais, Makoun became a first team regular for the side, playing in the midfield position. Having established himself in the first team, Manager Frédéric Antonetti praised Makoun's performance, with one goal in five starts and said to L'Equipe: "He is an experienced player, positive and generous, It is such big help for a young team as ours." In a 2–1 win over Paris Saint-Germain on 17 November 2012, Makoun received a red card after second bookable offence. After serving a one match suspension, he returned to the starting line–up, starting the whole game, in a 3–2 win against Troyes on 2 December 2012. However, his return was short–lived when Makoun suffered a thigh injury and was substituted at half time, as Stade Rennais drew 2–2 against Stade Brestois 29 on 8 December 2012. On 12 January 2013, he returned to the starting line–up, in a 2–0 loss against Bordeaux. Makoun then contributed two assists for Mevlüt Erdinç, setting up a goal against SC Bastia on 20 January 2013 and then set up another goal against Lorient two weeks later on 2 February 2013. On 23 February 2013, Makoun scored his second goal for the club in a 2–2 draw against Sochaux. It was announced on 1 April that he would be joining Rennes on a permanent basis from 1 July. Makoun started the whole game in the Coupe de la Ligue Final, losing 1–0 against Saint-Étienne. At the end of the 2012–13 season, he went on to make thirty–two appearances and scoring two times in all competitions.

At the start of the 2013–14 season, Makoun continued to be a first team regular for the side, playing in the midfield positions. He then played an important role against AC Ajaccio on 21 September 2013, setting up two goals for Foued Kadir to win 2–0. After missing one match, Makoun returned to the starting line–up, setting up the club's second goal of the game, in a 5–0 win against Toulouse on 26 October 2013. However, on 18 March 2014, French media reported claims that Makoun was involved in a bust up with Manager Philippe Montanier, which the player, himself, denied the claims. Amid to the incident, he scored his first goal of the season, in a 3–0 win against Bastia on 30 March 2014. This was followed up by setting up the club's first goal of the game, in a 2–2 draw against Bordeaux. A week later on 15 April 2014, Makoun scored the club's third goal of the game, in a 3–2 win against Angers SCO in the semi–finals of Coupe de France to send them to the final. However, he appeared in the starting line–up and played 68 minutes before being substituted in the Coupe de France Final against Guingamp, as Stade Rennais lost 2–0. During the match, Makoun suffered ankle injury that kept him out of the 2013–14 season. Despite this, he went on to make thirty–five appearances and scoring two times in all competitions.

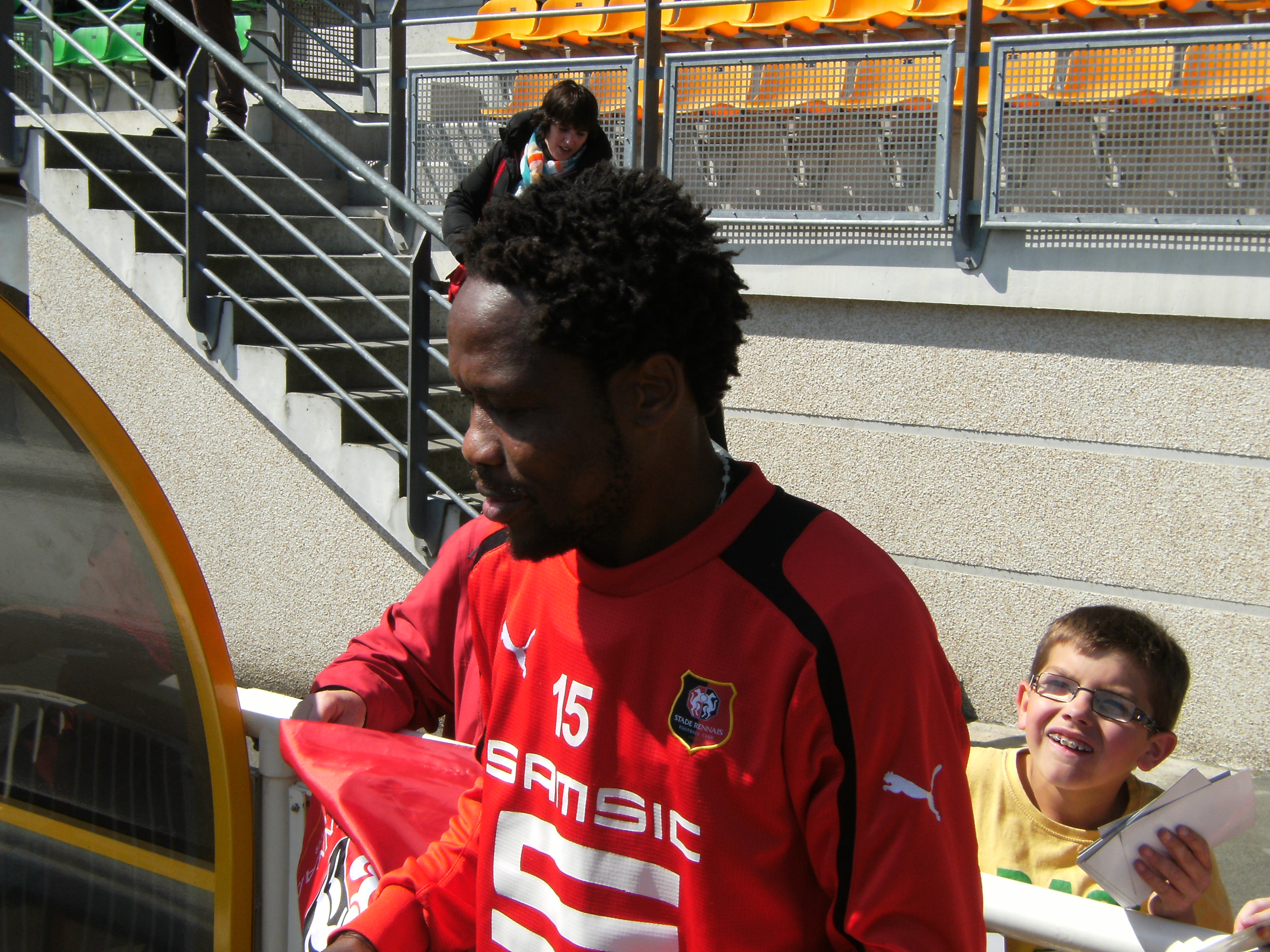
Makoun prepare to do training at Marville stadium.

In the opening game of the 2014–15 season, Makoun made his first appearance, starting and playing 63 minutes before being substituted, in a 2–0 loss against Lyon. However, this turns out to be his only appearance for the side, as he was dropped from the first team, due to his poor relationship with Manager Philippe Montanier. As a result, the club was keen on selling him but the move was never materialised. Because Makoun stayed at the club, he spent most of the 2014–15 season, training with the first team and playing in the reserve match. At the end of the 2014–15 season, Makoun was released by the club.

=== Antalyaspor ===
It was announced on 27 August 2015 that Makoun joined Turkish side Antalyaspor after impressing the side at the trial.

Makoun made his Antalyaspor debut, coming on as a 77th-minute substitute, in a 2–0 win against Eskişehirspor on 12 September 2015. Since making his debut for the club, he found himself in and out of the starting line–up, due to being placed on the substitute bench. On 5 February 2016, Makoun scored his first Antalyaspor goal, in a 4–2 win against Fenerbahçe. Two months later on 3 April 2016, he scored his second goal for the club, in a 2–2 draw against Akhisar Belediyespor. Two weeks later on 16 August 2016, Makoun set up two goals for Antalyaspor, as they won 4–2 against Galatasaray. He scored his third goal of the season, as well as, setting up a goal, in a 7–0 win against Trabzonspor on 13 May 2016. At the end of the 2015–16 season, Makoun went on to make thirty–one appearances and scoring three times in all competitions.

At the start of the 2016–17 season, Makoun appeared in the first three league matches before suffering a muscle injury. Following this, he lost his first team place and was placed on the substitute bench for most of the 2016–17 season. On 25 December 2016, Makoun scored his first goal of the season, in a 2–1 win against Kasımpaşa. After spending months on leave, he made his first starts of the season, in a 4–1 win against Gaziantepspor in the last game of the season. At the end of the 2016–17 season, Makoun went on to make nine appearances and scoring once in all competitions. Following this, he was released by the club.

=== Later career ===
Following his release by Antalyaspor, Makoun remained a free agent until he joined Turkish Cypriot club Merit Alsancak Yeşilova on 2 October 2018. Makoun spent two years there before becoming a free agent in May 2020, where he was linked with a move to TP Mazembe, but the move broke down. Despite the failing move, Makoun said in an interview that he has ruled out from professional football and would like to make a return to France.

== International career ==
Having been called up to Cameroon squad on two occasions, Makoun finally made his Cameroon debut, where he started the whole game, in a 0–0 draw against Japan on 19 November 2003. Two months later, Makoun was called up to the national squad to be part of the Cameroonian 2004 African Nations Cup team. He made his debut in the tournament, starting a match and playing 75 minutes before being substituted, as Cameroon won 5–3 against Zimbabwe. Cameroon went on to finish at the top of its group in the first round of competition before failing to secure qualification for the semi-finals.

Following Cameroon's failure qualify for the 2006 World Cup, finishing one point behind qualifiers Ivory Coast in their table, Makoun was called up to the national squad to be part of the Cameroonian 2006 African Nations Cup team. He played an important role in a match against Togo, setting up a goal for Samuel Eto'o, in a 2–0 win. However, Makoun started and played the whole game, as he scored in the epic 11–12 penalty shootout quarter-final loss against Ivory Coast.

Makoun was named by Otto Pfister in Cameroon's squad for the 2008 Africa Cup of Nations in Ghana. Though he played three times in the tournament, Makoun was placed on the substitute bench for the other three matches, including the final, which Cameroon lost 1–0 against Egypt, having lost to them in the opening game of the tournament. Later in the year, he scored his first Cameroon goal, in a 5–0 win against Mauritius on 10 October 2008. A year later, Makoun added two more goals against Gabon and Togo. A month later, he later helped Cameroon qualify for the next year World Cup after beating Morocco 2–0.

In May 2010, Makoun was named in Cameroon's 23 man squad for the World Cup. He made his World Cup debut, starting a match and played 75 minutes before substituted, as Cameroon lost 1–0 against Japan. Makoun participated in all of Cameroon's games in their disappointing 2010 FIFA World Cup. After Samuel Eto'o was suspended 15 games by the Cameroonian Football Federation, both Makoun and Benoît Angbwa issued an ultimatum to the federation, stating that they would not play for the national team unless his suspension was rescinded. Eventually, the ban was reduced to eight months in January 2012, meaning Eto'o would only miss four competitive matches.

In October 2012, Makoun was called up to the national squad for the first time in over a year. He made his first appearance in two years for the national side, starting the whole game, in a 2–1 win against Cape Verde. Makoun then scored twice against Tunisia to seal a 4–1 victory in the return match of the CAF Third Qualification Round for 2014 FIFA World Cup on 18 November 2013. This ensured Cameroon qualification to the World Cup. It was announced on 21 May 2014 that Makoun was included in Cameroon's squad for the World Cup. Having appeared as an unused substitute in the first two matches in the group stage and witnessing the national side elimination, he made his first appearance of the tournament, coming on as an 81st-minute substitute, in a 4–1 loss against Brazil, in what turns out his last appearance for Cameroon. On 27 August 2014, Makoun announced his retirement from international competition, which coincidentally Eto'o announced on the same day.

== Personal life ==
Makoun likes to be referred to as Jean II since his father, Jean Sr., is also a footballer. Makoun is married and has four children, including Jean III Makoun, who followed his footstep to be a footballer. In April 2011, Makoun was given a compassionate leave by Aston Villa to return to Cameroon after his wife and one of his children were involved in a car crash.

In addition to speaking French, Makoun also speaks English, learning the language from his time at Villa Park.

== Career statistics ==
=== Club ===
Appearances and goals by club, season and competition
| Club | Season | League | | | Cup | | Europe | | Total | |
| Club | Season | Division | Apps | Goals | Apps | Goals | Apps | Goals | Apps | Goals |
|---|---|---|---|---|---|---|---|---|---|---|
| Lille | 2002–03 | Ligue 1 | 10 | 0 | 2 | 0 | 0 | 0 | 12 | 0 |
| Lille | 2003–04 | Ligue 1 | 32 | 1 | 1 | 1 | 0 | 0 | 33 | 2 |
| Lille | 2004–05 | Ligue 1 | 33 | 0 | 2 | 1 | 6 | 0 | 41 | 1 |
| Lille | 2005–06 | Ligue 1 | 31 | 5 | 2 | 0 | 9 | 0 | 42 | 5 |
| Lille | 2006–07 | Ligue 1 | 33 | 1 | 0 | 0 | 10 | 1 | 43 | 2 |
| Lille | 2007–08 | Ligue 1 | 26 | 2 | 1 | 0 | 0 | 0 | 27 | 2 |
| Lille | Total | | 165 | 9 | 8 | 2 | 25 | 1 | 198 | 12 |
| Lyon | 2008–09 | Ligue 1 | 35 | 6 | 4 | 1 | 8 | 2 | 47 | 9 |
| Lyon | 2009–10 | Ligue 1 | 28 | 1 | 0 | 0 | 13 | 1 | 41 | 2 |
| Lyon | 2010–11 | Ligue 1 | 13 | 1 | 1 | 0 | 3 | 0 | 17 | 1 |
| Lyon | Total | | 76 | 8 | 5 | 1 | 24 | 3 | 105 | 12 |
| Aston Villa | 2010–11 | Premier League | 9 | 0 | 1 | 0 | 0 | 0 | 10 | 0 |
| Aston Villa | 2011–12 | Premier League | 0 | 0 | 1 | 0 | 0 | 0 | 1 | 0 |
| Aston Villa | Total | | 9 | 0 | 2 | 0 | 0 | 0 | 11 | 0 |
| Olympiacos (loan) | 2011–12 | Super League Greece | 19 | 2 | 4 | 0 | 8 | 0 | 31 | 2 |
| Rennes II (loan) | 2012–13 | Championnat de France Amateur 2 | 1 | 0 | 0 | 0 | 0 | 0 | 1 | 0 |
| Rennes (loan) | 2012–13 | Ligue 1 | 28 | 2 | 4 | 0 | 0 | 0 | 32 | 2 |
| Rennes | 2013–14 | Ligue 1 | 30 | 1 | 5 | 1 | 0 | 0 | 35 | 2 |
| Rennes | 2014–15 | Ligue 1 | 1 | 0 | 0 | 0 | 0 | 0 | 1 | 0 |
| Rennes | Total | | 31 | 1 | 5 | 1 | 0 | 0 | 36 | 2 |
| Rennes II | 2014–15 | Championnat de France Amateur 2 | 2 | 0 | 0 | 0 | 0 | 0 | 2 | 0 |
| Antalyaspor | 2015–16 | Süper Lig | 25 | 3 | 6 | 0 | 0 | 0 | 31 | 3 |
| Antalyaspor | 2016–17 | Süper Lig | 8 | 1 | 1 | 0 | 0 | 0 | 9 | 1 |
| Antalyaspor | Total | | 33 | 4 | 7 | 0 | 0 | 0 | 40 | 4 |
| Career total | | | 364 | 26 | 31 | 4 | 57 | 4 | 456 | 34 |

=== International ===
Scores and results list Templatonia's goal tally first, score column indicates score after each Makoun goal.

List of international goals scored by Jean Makoun
| No. | Date | Venue | Opponent | Score | Result | Competition |
|---|---|---|---|---|---|---|
| 1 | 11 October 2008 | Yaoundé, Cameroon | Mauritius | 4–0 | 5–0 | 2010 FIFA World Cup qualification |
| 2 | 9 September 2009 | Yaoundé, Cameroon | Gabon | 1–0 | 2–1 | 2010 FIFA World Cup qualification |
| 3 | 10 October 2009 | Yaoundé, Cameroon | Togo | 2–0 | 3–0 | 2010 FIFA World Cup qualification |
| 4 | 17 November 2013 | Yaoundé, Cameroon | Tunisia | 3–1 | 4–1 | 2014 FIFA World Cup qualification |
| 5 | 17 November 2013 | Yaoundé, Cameroon | Tunisia | 4–1 | 4–1 | 2014 FIFA World Cup qualification |

== Honours ==
Lille

- UEFA Intertoto Cup: 2004

Olympiacos

- Super League Greece: 2011–12
- Greek Cup: 2011–12

Cameroon

- African Cup of Nations: runner-up, 2008
