= Loïc Abenzoar =

French footballer (born 1989)

Personal information
- Date of birth: 14 February 1989 (age 37)
- Place of birth: Lyon, France
- Height: 1.81 m (5 ft 11 1/2 in)
- Position: Right-back

Youth career
- 2000–2009: Lyon

Senior career*
Years	Team	Apps	(Gls)
2009–2014	Lyon	0	(0)
2010–2011	→ Arles-Avignon (loan)	12	(0)
2011–2012	→ Vannes (loan)	17	(0)
2013–2014	AS Lyon-Duchère	18	(1)
2014	Hønefoss	12	(1)
2015	Fredrikstad	20	(1)
2016–2019	Villefranche	35	(3)
2020–202?	Chassieu Décines		

International career
2004–2005	France U16	13	(0)
2005–2006	France U17	7	(0)
2006–2007	France U18	5	(0)
2007–2008	France U19	5	(0)
2009	France U20	2	(0)
- * Club domestic league appearances and goals

Loïc Abenzoar (born 14 February 1989) is a retired French footballer who played as a right-back. He is a France youth international having earned caps with all of the youth teams beginning with the under-16 team.

== Career ==
Abenzoar joined Lyon, his hometown club, in 2000. On 12 June 2009, he signed his first professional contract agreeing to a three-year deal. He made his professional debut on 14 August 2010 in a league match against Lens, while playing on loan with Arles-Avignon. He went from Hønefoss, Norway in 2014 to Fredrikstad, Norway on 17 March 2015 In November 2016 he joined Villefranche.

== Later career ==
In August 2019, Abenzoar was hired as a fitness coach for Lyon's B team.

== Career statistics ==
As of match played 17 May 2019

Appearances and goals by club, season and competition
Club	Season	League			National Cup		League Cup		Other		Total	
Club	Season	Division	Apps	Goals	Apps	Goals	Apps	Goals	Apps	Goals	Apps	Goals
Lyon II	2010–11	CFA	1	0	—		—		0	0	1	0
Lyon II	2011–12	CFA	2	0	—		—		0	0	2	0
Lyon II	2012–13	CFA	23	0	—		—		0	0	23	0
Lyon II	Total		26	0	—		—		0	0	26	0
Arles-Avignon (loan)	2010–11	Ligue 1	12	0	0	0	1	0	—		13	0
Vannes (loan)	2011–12	National	17	0	0	0	0	0	—		17	0
Lyon-Duchère	2013–14	CFA	18	1	0	0	—		—		18	1
Hønefoss	2014	1. divisjon	12	1	0	0	—		—		12	1
Fredrikstad	2015	1. divisjon	20	1	2	0	—		—		22	1
Villefranche	2016–17	CFA	14	0	0	0	—		—		14	0
Villefranche	2017–18	National 2	17	2	1	0	—		—		18	2
Villefranche	2018–19	National	4	0	0	0	—		—		4	0
Villefranche	Total		35	2	1	0	0	0	0	0	36	2
Career Total			140	5	3	0	1	0	0	0	144	5
