= 2009–10 UEFA Champions League knockout phase =

International football competition

The knockout phase of the 2009–10 UEFA Champions League began on 16 February and concluded on 22 May 2010 with the final won by Inter Milan against Bayern Munich 2–0 at the Santiago Bernabéu Stadium in Madrid, Spain. The knockout phase involved the sixteen teams who finished in the top two in each of their groups in the group stage.

Times are CET/CEST, (Note: CET (UTC+1) for matches to 17 March 2010, and CEST (UTC+2) for matches from 30 March 2010.) as listed by UEFA (local times, if different, are in parentheses).

== Format ==
Each tie in the knockout phase, apart from the final, was played over two legs, with each team playing one leg at home. The team that had the higher aggregate score over the two legs progressed to the next round. In the event that aggregate scores finished level, the team that scored more goals away from home over the two legs progressed. If away goals were also equal, 30 minutes of extra time were played. If there were goals scored during extra time and the aggregate score was still level, the visiting team qualified by virtue of more away goals scored. If no goals were scored during extra time, the tie was settled via a penalty shoot-out.

The draw mechanism for each round is as follows:

- In the draw for the round of 16, matches were played between the winners of one group and the runners-up of a different group, with the group winner hosting the second leg. Teams from the same group or same association cannot be drawn against each other.
- From the quarter-finals onwards, these restrictions did not apply and teams from same group or same associations may be drawn against each other.

In the final, the tie was played over just one leg at a neutral venue. If scores were level at the end of normal time in the final, extra time was played, followed by penalties if scores remained tied.

== Qualified teams ==
Key to colours
Seeded in round of 16 draw
Unseeded in round of 16 draw

Group	Winners	Runners-up
A	(France) Bordeaux	(Germany) Bayern Munich
B	(England) Manchester United	(Russia) CSKA Moscow
C	(Spain) Real Madrid	(Italy) Milan
D	(England) Chelsea	(Portugal) Porto
E	(Italy) Fiorentina	(France) Lyon
F	(Spain) Barcelona	(Italy) Inter Milan
G	(Spain) Sevilla	(Germany) VfB Stuttgart
H	(England) Arsenal	(Greece) Olympiacos

== Bracket ==
Round of 16
(Germany) Bayern Munich (a)	2	2	4
(Italy) Fiorentina	1	3	4
(Italy) Milan	2	0	2
(England) Manchester United	3	4	7
(France) Lyon	1	1	2
(Spain) Real Madrid	0	1	1
(Greece) Olympiacos	0	1	1
(France) Bordeaux	1	2	3
(Italy) Inter Milan	2	1	3
(England) Chelsea	1	0	1
(Russia) CSKA Moscow	1	2	3
(Spain) Sevilla	1	1	2
(Portugal) Porto	2	0	2
(England) Arsenal	1	5	6
(Germany) VfB Stuttgart	1	0	1
(Spain) Barcelona	1	4	5

Quarter-finals
(Germany) Bayern Munich (a)	2	2	4
(England) Manchester United	1	3	4
(France) Lyon	3	0	3
(France) Bordeaux	1	1	2
(Italy) Inter Milan	1	1	2
(Russia) CSKA Moscow	0	0	0
(England) Arsenal	2	1	3
(Spain) Barcelona	2	4	6

Semi-finals
(Germany) Bayern Munich	1	3	4
(France) Lyon	0	0	0
(Italy) Inter Milan	3	0	3
(Spain) Barcelona	1	1	2

Final
22 May – Madrid
(Germany) Bayern Munich	0
(Italy) Inter Milan	2

== Round of 16 ==
=== Summary ===
The draw for the competition's round of 16 was held on 18 December 2009. Starting from this season, the matches in the round of 16 were held over a month, instead of the previous two weeks. The first legs were played on 16, 17, 23 and 24 February, and the second legs were played on 9, 10, 16 and 17 March 2010.

CSKA Moscow became the first Russian team to advance to the quarter-finals under the present format (16 teams in the knockout stage).

Team 1	Agg.	Team 2	1st leg	2nd leg
VfB Stuttgart (Germany)	1–5	(Spain) Barcelona	1–1	0–4
Olympiacos (Greece)	1–3	(France) Bordeaux	0–1	1–2
Inter Milan (Italy)	3–1	(England) Chelsea	2–1	1–0
Bayern Munich (Germany)	4–4 (a)	(Italy) Fiorentina	2–1	2–3
CSKA Moscow (Russia)	3–2	(Spain) Sevilla	1–1	2–1
Lyon (France)	2–1	(Spain) Real Madrid	1–0	1–1
Porto (Portugal)	2–6	(England) Arsenal	2–1	0–5
Milan (Italy)	2–7	(England) Manchester United	2–3	0–4

=== Matches ===
23 February 2010
20:45

VfB Stuttgart (Germany)	1–1	(Spain) Barcelona
Cacau 25'	Report	Ibrahimović 52'

Mercedes-Benz Arena, Stuttgart
Attendance: 39,430
Referee: Björn Kuipers (Netherlands)
17 March 2010
20:45

Barcelona (Spain)	4–0	(Germany) VfB Stuttgart
Messi 13', 60'; Pedro 22'; Bojan 89'	Report

Camp Nou, Barcelona
Attendance: 88,543
Referee: Alain Hamer (Luxembourg)

Barcelona won 5–1 on aggregate.

23 February 2010
20:45 (21:45 UTC+2)

Olympiacos (Greece)	0–1	(France) Bordeaux
	Report	Ciani 45+2'

Karaiskakis Stadium, Piraeus
Attendance: 29,773
Referee: Howard Webb (England)
17 March 2010
20:45

Bordeaux (France)	2–1	(Greece) Olympiacos
Gourcuff 5'; Chamakh 88'	Report	Mitroglou 65'

Stade Chaban-Delmas, Bordeaux
Attendance: 31,004
Referee: Olegário Benquerença (Portugal)

Bordeaux won 3–1 on aggregate.

24 February 2010
20:45

Inter Milan (Italy)	2–1	(England) Chelsea
Milito 3'; Cambiasso 55'	Report	Kalou 51'

San Siro, Milan
Attendance: 78,971
Referee: Manuel Mejuto González (Spain)
16 March 2010
20:45 (19:45 UTC+0)

Chelsea (England)	0–1	(Italy) Inter Milan
	Report	Eto'o 78'

Stamford Bridge, London
Attendance: 38,107
Referee: Wolfgang Stark (Germany)

Inter Milan won 3–1 on aggregate.

17 February 2010
20:45

Bayern Munich (Germany)	2–1	(Italy) Fiorentina
Robben 45+3' (pen.); Klose 89'	Report	Krøldrup 50'

Allianz Arena, Munich
Attendance: 66,000
Referee: Tom Henning Øvrebø (Norway)
9 March 2010
20:45

Fiorentina (Italy)	3–2	(Germany) Bayern Munich
Vargas 28'; Jovetić 54', 64'	Report	Van Bommel 60'; Robben 65'

Stadio Artemio Franchi, Florence
Attendance: 42,762
Referee: Alberto Undiano Mallenco (Spain)

4–4 on aggregate; Bayern Munich won on away goals.

24 February 2010
18:30 (20:30 UTC+3)

CSKA Moscow (Russia)	1–1	(Spain) Sevilla
González 66'	Report	Negredo 25'

Luzhniki Stadium, Moscow
Attendance: 28,600
Referee: Felix Brych (Germany)
16 March 2010
20:45

Sevilla (Spain)	1–2	(Russia) CSKA Moscow
Perotti 41'	Report	Necid 39'; Honda 55'

Ramón Sánchez Pizjuán, Seville
Attendance: 29,666
Referee: Viktor Kassai (Hungary)

CSKA Moscow won 3–2 on aggregate.

16 February 2010
20:45

Lyon (France)	1–0	(Spain) Real Madrid
Makoun 47'	Report

Stade de Gerland, Lyon
Attendance: 40,327
Referee: Martin Atkinson (England)
10 March 2010
20:45

Real Madrid (Spain)	1–1	(France) Lyon
Ronaldo 6'	Report	Pjanić 75'

Santiago Bernabéu, Madrid
Attendance: 71,569
Referee: Nicola Rizzoli (Italy)

Lyon won 2–1 on aggregate.

17 February 2010
20:45 (19:45 UTC+0)

Porto (Portugal)	2–1	(England) Arsenal
Varela 11'; Falcao 51'	Report	Campbell 18'

Estádio do Dragão, Porto
Attendance: 40,717
Referee: Martin Hansson (Sweden)
9 March 2010
20:45 (19:45 UTC+0)

Arsenal (England)	5–0	(Portugal) Porto
Bendtner 10', 25', 90+1' (pen.); Nasri 63'; Eboué 66'	Report

Emirates Stadium, London
Attendance: 59,661
Referee: Frank De Bleeckere (Belgium)

Arsenal won 6–2 on aggregate.

16 February 2010
20:45

Milan (Italy)	2–3	(England) Manchester United
Ronaldinho 3'; Seedorf 85'	Report	Scholes 36'; Rooney 66', 74'

San Siro, Milan
Attendance: 78,587
Referee: Olegário Benquerença (Portugal)
10 March 2010
20:45 (19:45 UTC+0)

Manchester United (England)	4–0	(Italy) Milan
Rooney 13', 46'; Park Ji-sung 59'; Fletcher 88'	Report

Old Trafford, Manchester
Attendance: 74,595
Referee: Massimo Busacca (Switzerland)

Manchester United won 7–2 on aggregate.

== Quarter-finals ==
=== Summary ===
The draw for the quarter-finals took place on 19 March 2010. The first legs were played on 30 and 31 March, and the second legs were played on 6 and 7 April 2010.

Team 1	Agg.	Team 2	1st leg	2nd leg
Lyon (France)	3–2	(France) Bordeaux	3–1	0–1
Bayern Munich (Germany)	4–4 (a)	(England) Manchester United	2–1	2–3
Arsenal (England)	3–6	(Spain) Barcelona	2–2	1–4
Inter Milan (Italy)	2–0	(Russia) CSKA Moscow	1–0	1–0

=== Matches ===
30 March 2010
20:45

Lyon (France)	3–1	(France) Bordeaux
Lisandro 10', 77' (pen.); Bastos 32'	Report	Chamakh 14'

Stade de Gerland, Lyon
Attendance: 37,859
Referee: Felix Brych (Germany)
7 April 2010
20:45

Bordeaux (France)	1–0	(France) Lyon
Chamakh 45'	Report

Stade Chaban-Delmas, Bordeaux
Attendance: 31,962
Referee: Alberto Undiano Mallenco (Spain)

Lyon won 3–2 on aggregate.

30 March 2010
20:45

Bayern Munich (Germany)	2–1	(England) Manchester United
Ribéry 77'; Olić 90+2'	Report	Rooney 2'

Allianz Arena, Munich
Attendance: 66,000
Referee: Frank De Bleeckere (Belgium)
7 April 2010
20:45 (19:45 UTC+1)

Manchester United (England)	3–2	(Germany) Bayern Munich
Gibson 3'; Nani 7', 41'	Report	Olić 43'; Robben 74'

Old Trafford, Manchester
Attendance: 74,482
Referee: Nicola Rizzoli (Italy)

4–4 on aggregate; Bayern Munich won on away goals.

31 March 2010
20:45 (19:45 UTC+1)

Arsenal (England)	2–2	(Spain) Barcelona
Walcott 69'; Fàbregas 85' (pen.)	Report	Ibrahimović 46', 59'

Emirates Stadium, London
Attendance: 59,572
Referee: Massimo Busacca (Switzerland)
6 April 2010
20:45

Barcelona (Spain)	4–1	(England) Arsenal
Messi 21', 37', 42', 88'	Report	Bendtner 18'

Camp Nou, Barcelona
Attendance: 93,330
Referee: Wolfgang Stark (Germany)

Barcelona won 6–3 on aggregate.

31 March 2010
20:45

Inter Milan (Italy)	1–0	(Russia) CSKA Moscow
Milito 65'	Report

San Siro, Milan
Attendance: 69,398
Referee: Howard Webb (England)
6 April 2010
18:30 (20:30 UTC+4)

CSKA Moscow (Russia)	0–1	(Italy) Inter Milan
	Report	Sneijder 6'

Luzhniki Stadium, Moscow
Attendance: 54,400
Referee: Stéphane Lannoy (France)

Inter Milan won 2–0 on aggregate.

== Semi-finals ==
=== Summary ===
The draw for the semi-finals took place on 19 March 2010, immediately after the draw for the quarter-finals. The first legs were played on 20 and 21 April, and the second legs were played on 27 and 28 April 2010. There were fears that the first legs would have to be postponed due to the eruptions of the volcano at Eyjafjallajökull in Iceland. On 18 April, UEFA issued a statement that the matches would go ahead and that the teams would have to make alternate travel arrangements.

Team 1	Agg.	Team 2	1st leg	2nd leg
Bayern Munich (Germany)	4–0	(France) Lyon	1–0	3–0
Inter Milan (Italy)	3–2	(Spain) Barcelona	3–1	0–1

=== Matches ===
21 April 2010
20:45

Bayern Munich (Germany)	1–0	(France) Lyon
Robben 69'	Report

Allianz Arena, Munich
Attendance: 66,000
Referee: Roberto Rosetti (Italy)
27 April 2010
20:45

Lyon (France)	0–3	(Germany) Bayern Munich
	Report	Olić 26', 67', 78'

Stade de Gerland, Lyon
Attendance: 39,414
Referee: Massimo Busacca (Switzerland)

Bayern Munich won 4–0 on aggregate.

20 April 2010
20:45

Inter Milan (Italy)	3–1	(Spain) Barcelona
Sneijder 30'; Maicon 48'; Milito 61'	Report	Pedro 19'

San Siro, Milan
Attendance: 79,000
Referee: Olegário Benquerença (Portugal)
28 April 2010
20:45

Barcelona (Spain)	1–0	(Italy) Inter Milan
Piqué 84'	Report

Camp Nou, Barcelona
Attendance: 96,214
Referee: Frank De Bleeckere (Belgium)

Inter Milan won 3–2 on aggregate.

== Final ==
The final was contested by Germany's Bayern Munich and Italy's Inter Milan. It was played on 22 May 2010 at the Santiago Bernabéu Stadium in Madrid, Spain. The stadium, home of Real Madrid, had hosted three previous European Cup finals, in 1957, 1969 and 1980. A draw was held on 19 March 2010, after the quarter-final and semi-final draws, to determine the "home" team for administrative purposes. It was the first time that a UEFA Champions League final was played on a Saturday night. England's Howard Webb was appointed to referee the final. The two clubs competing in the final had each won their domestic league and cup competitions, meaning that the winner would become only the sixth club in Europe to win a continental treble, and the first club from their respective countries. It was also the second consecutive treble, following that of Barcelona in the previous season.

22 May 2010
20:45

Bayern Munich (Germany)	0–2	(Italy) Inter Milan
	Report	Milito 35', 70'

Santiago Bernabéu, Madrid
Attendance: 73,490
Referee: Howard Webb (England)
