= Alexis Carra =

French footballer (born 1990)

Personal information
- Full name: Alexis Carra
- Date of birth: 27 April 1990 (age 36)
- Place of birth: Villefranche-sur-Saône, France
- Height: 1.80 m (5 ft 11 in)
- Position: Striker

Senior career*
Years	Team	Apps	(Gls)
2008–2009	Lyon	0	(0)
2009–2011	Vicenza	2	(0)
2011–2012	A.S. Cittadella	18	(0)
- * Club domestic league appearances and goals as of 1 July 2012

Alexis Carra (born 27 April 1990) is a French footballer who plays as a striker.
