= 2012–13 Olympique Lyonnais season =

Lyon
2012–13 season
- Owner: OL Groupe
- Chairman: Jean-Michel Aulas
- Manager: Rémi Garde
- Stadium: Stade de Gerland
- Ligue 1: 3rd
- Coupe de France: Round of 64 (vs. Épinal)
- Coupe de la Ligue: Round of 16 (vs. Nice)
- Trophée des Champions: Winners (vs. Montpellier)
- UEFA Europa League: Round of 32 (vs. Tottenham Hotspur)
- Top goalscorer: League: Bafétimbi Gomis (16); All: Bafétimbi Gomis (20)
Home colours	Away colours	Third colours

The 2012–13 season was Olympique Lyonnais's 63rd professional season since its creation in 1950. The club competed in Ligue 1, finishing third, in the Coupe de France, Coupe de la Ligue, and in the UEFA Europa League.

== Squad ==
=== First-team squad ===
As of 26 January 2013

Note: Flags indicate national team as defined under FIFA eligibility rules; some limited exceptions apply. Players may hold more than one non-FIFA nationality.

No.	Pos.	Nation	Player
1	GK	FRA	Rémy Vercoutre
2	DF	FRA	Mehdi Zeffane (Youth)
4	DF	BFA	Bakary Koné
5	DF	CRO	Dejan Lovren
6	MF	FRA	Gueïda Fofana
7	MF	FRA	Clément Grenier
8	MF	FRA	Yoann Gourcuff
9	FW	ARG	Lisandro López
10	FW	FRA	Alexandre Lacazette
12	MF	FRA	Jordan Ferri
13	DF	FRA	Anthony Réveillère
14	DF	FRA	Mouhamadou Dabo
15	DF	SRB	Milan Biševac

No.	Pos.	Nation	Player
16	GK	POR	Anthony Lopes
17	MF	FRA	Steed Malbranque
18	FW	FRA	Bafétimbi Gomis
19	FW	FRA	Jimmy Briand
21	MF	FRA	Maxime Gonalons (captain)
23	DF	FRA	Samuel Umtiti
24	FW	CMR	Clinton N'Jie (Youth)
25	FW	FRA	Yassine Benzia
26	FW	FRA	Anthony Martial (Youth)
27	FW	FRA	Alassane Pléa (Youth)
28	MF	COD	Arnold Mvuemba
31	MF	FRA	Rachid Ghezzal
40	GK	FRA	Mathieu Gorgelin

=== Out on loan ===
Note: Flags indicate national team as defined under FIFA eligibility rules; some limited exceptions apply. Players may hold more than one non-FIFA nationality.

No.	Pos.	Nation	Player
11	MF	BRA	Michel Bastos (on loan to Schalke 04)
20	DF	ARG	Fabián Monzón (on loan to Fluminense)
22	MF	MLI	Sidy Koné (on loan to SM Caen)

No.	Pos.	Nation	Player
29	FW	GUI	Mohamed Yattara (on loan to ESTAC)
30	GK	BEL	Théo Defourny (on loan to FC Rouen)
36	FW	FRA	Harry Novillo (on loan to Gazélec Ajaccio)

=== Reserve squad ===
Note: Flags indicate national team as defined under FIFA eligibility rules; some limited exceptions apply. Players may hold more than one non-FIFA nationality.

No.	Pos.	Nation	Player
32	MF	FRA	Maxime Blanc
33	DF	FRA	William Le Pogam
34	MF	FRA	Farès Bahlouli
35	FW	FRA	Marwane Benamra
37	MF	ALG	Nassim Zitouni
38	FW	FRA	Mour Paye
39	DF	FRA	Mouhamadou-Naby Sarr
41	MF	FRA	Grégoire Viricel
42	MF	FRA	Adrien Cabon
43	GK	FRA	Lucas Mocio
44	FW	FRA	Jordan Dalla Vecchia
45	GK	SUI	Jérémy Frick
46	MF	FRA	Zakarie Labidi
47	MF	SUI	Kévin Massivi Tsimba
48	MF	FRA	Sébastien Flochon

No.	Pos.	Nation	Player
49	FW	CAF	Berthier Dolgue
50	FW	FRA	Anthony Martial
51	DF	FRA	Arnaud Bloch
52	DF	FRA	Pierre Ertel
53	MF	FRA	Aldo Kalulu
54	DF	FRA	Dylan Mboumbouni
55	DF	FRA	Loïc Abenzoar
56	MF	FRA	Corentin Tolisso
58	DF	FRA	Louis Nganioni
59	DF	FRA	Romaric N'Gouma
70	GK	FRA	Dorian Grange
—	DF	BFA	Biassoum Cheik Coulibaly
—	DF	CAF	Amos Youga
—	MF	FRA	Nabil Fekir
—	MF	CMR	Christian N'Gando

== Competitions ==
=== Trophée des Champions ===
28 July 2012 Final	Montpellier	2–2 (2–4 p)	Lyon	Harrison, New Jersey, United States
15:00 EDT	Utaka 27'; Herrera 56' (pen.)	Report	Gomis 44'; Briand 77'	Stadium: Red Bull Arena; Attendance: 15,166; Referee: Jorge Gonzalez (United States)
	Penalties
	Charbonnier (penalty missed); Camara (penalty scored); Bedimo (penalty missed); Yanga-Mbiwa (penalty scored)		(penalty missed) Fofana; (penalty scored) Cissokho; (penalty scored) Koné; (penalty scored) Benzia; (penalty scored) Briand

=== Ligue 1 ===
==== League table ====
Pos	Team	Pld	W	D	L	GF	GA	GD	Pts	Qualification or relegation
1	Paris Saint-Germain (C)	38	25	8	5	69	23	+46	83	Qualification for the Champions League group stage
2	Marseille	38	21	8	9	42	36	+6	71	Qualification for the Champions League group stage
3	Lyon	38	19	10	9	61	38	+23	67	Qualification for the Champions League third qualifying round
4	Nice	38	18	10	10	57	46	+11	64	Qualification for the Europa League play-off round
5	Saint-Étienne	38	16	15	7	60	32	+28	63	Qualification for the Europa League third qualifying round (Note: Saint-Étienne, as winner of the 2012–13 Coupe de la Ligue, qualifies for the third qualifying round of 2013–14 UEFA Europa League.)

Source: Ligue 1
Rules for classification: 1) points; 2) goal difference; 3) number of goals scored.
(C) Champions

==== Results summary ====
Overall								Home						Away					
Pld	W	D	L	GF	GA	GD	Pts	W	D	L	GF	GA	GD	W	D	L	GF	GA	GD
38	19	10	9	61	38	+23	67	11	4	4	34	17	+17	8	6	5	27	21	+6

Source: Soccerway

==== Results by round ====
Round	1	2	3	4	5	6	7	8	9	10	11	12	13	14	15	16	17	18	19	20	21	22	23	24	25	26	27	28	29	30	31	32	33	34	35	36	37	38
Ground	A	H	A	H	H	A	H	A	H	A	H	A	H	A	H	A	H	A	H	A	H	A	A	H	A	H	A	H	A	H	A	H	A	H	A	H	A	H
Result	W	W	D	W	W	D	L	D	W	W	W	D	W	L	W	W	D	L	W	W	D	W	L	L	W	W	D	D	L	L	L	W	W	D	W	L	D	W
Position	6	1	2	2	2	2	3	3	3	2	1	1	1	1	1	1	1	2	2	1	2	2	2	2	2	2	2	2	2	3	4	3	3	3	3	3	3	3

Source: Ligue 1
A = Away; H = Home; W = Win; D = Draw; L = Loss
Notes: Match 10 versus Marseille was postponed until 28 November 2012 and therefore should appear between matches 14 & 15.

==== Matches ====
Win Draw Loss

11 August 2012 1	Rennes	0–1	Lyon	Rennes
21:00 CEST		Report	Gourcuff 16'	Stadium: Stade de la Route de Lorient; Attendance: 20,348; Referee: Nicolas Rainville

18 August 2012 2	Lyon	4–1	Troyes	Lyon
17:00 CEST	Gomis 51', 90+3'; Bastos 65'; López 89'	Report	Bahebeck 47'	Stadium: Stade de Gerland; Attendance: 25,186; Referee: Benoît Millot

24 August 2012 3	Evian	1–1	Lyon	Annecy
20:45 CEST	Barbosa 56'	Report	Bastos 74'	Stadium: Parc des Sports; Attendance: 13,581; Referee: Lionel Jaffredo

1 September 2012 4	Lyon	3–2	Valenciennes	Lyon
17:00 CEST	Bastos 18'; Gomis 21'; Grenier 66'	Report	Gil 12'; Pujol 76'	Stadium: Stade de Gerland; Attendance: 25,380; Referee: Fredy Fautrel

16 September 2012 5	Lyon	2–0	Ajaccio	Lyon
17:00 CEST	Lovren 25'; López 75'	Report		Stadium: Stade de Gerland; Attendance: 25,666; Referee: Bartolomeu Varela

23 September 2012 6	Lille	1–1	Lyon	Villeneuve-d'Ascq
21:00 CEST	Roux 7'	Report	López 80'	Stadium: Grand Stade Lille Métropole; Attendance: 43,475; Referee: Clément Turpin

30 September 2012 7	Lyon	0–2	Bordeaux	Lyon
21:00 CEST		Report	Trémoulinas 65'; Diabaté 82'	Stadium: Stade de Gerland; Attendance: 30,892; Referee: Laurent Duhamel

7 October 2012 8	Lorient	1–1	Lyon	Lorient
17:00 CEST	Aliadière 47'	Report	Gomis 23'	Stadium: Stade du Moustoir; Attendance: 15,090; Referee: Saïd Ennjimi

21 October 2012 9	Lyon	1–0	Brest	Lyon
17:00 CEST	Gomis 57'	Report		Stadium: Stade de Gerland; Attendance: 30,047; Referee: Amaury Delerue

4 November 2012 11	Lyon	5–2	Bastia	Lyon
17:00 CET	Gonalons 5'; Lacazette 26'; López 56' (pen.); Briand 90+3'; Malbranque 90+5' (pen.)	Report	Khazri 28'; Rothen 32'	Stadium: Stade de Gerland; Attendance: 27,363; Referee: Fredy Fautrel

11 November 2012 12	Sochaux	1–1	Lyon	Montbéliard
17:00 CET	Privat 71'	Report	Gonalons 24'	Stadium: Stade Auguste Bonal; Attendance: 13,554; Referee: Antony Gautier

18 November 2012 13	Lyon	3–0	Reims	Lyon
14:00 CET	Weber 43' (o.g.); Gomis 73'; López 90'	Report		Stadium: Stade de Gerland; Attendance: 33,222; Referee: Benoît Millot

25 November 2012 14	Toulouse	3–0	Lyon	Toulouse
17:00 CET	Ben Yedder 50', 87'; Capoue 90+1'	Report		Stadium: Stadium Municipal; Attendance: 20,580; Referee: Philippe Kalt

28 November 2012 10	Marseille	1–4	Lyon	Marseille
21:00 CET	Rémy 77'	Report	Gomis 3' (pen.), 34', 72'; Malbranque 48'	Stadium: Stade Vélodrome; Attendance: 35,359; Referee: Clément Turpin

1 December 2012 15	Lyon	1–0	Montpellier	Lyon
17:00 CET	Gomis 26'	Report		Stadium: Stade de Gerland; Attendance: 31,491; Referee: Lionel Jaffredo

9 December 2012 16	Saint-Étienne	0–1	Lyon	Saint Étienne
21:00 CET		Report	Dabo (red card) 56'; Bastos 65'	Stadium: Stade Geoffroy-Guichard; Attendance: 26,579; Referee: Tony Chapron

12 December 2012 17	Lyon	1–1	Nancy	Lyon
19:00 CET	Bastos 83'	Report	Lotiès 74'	Stadium: Stade de Gerland; Attendance: 31,952; Referee: Jean-Charles Cailleux

16 December 2012 18	Paris Saint-Germain	1–0	Lyon	Paris
21:00 CET	Matuidi 45+2'	Report		Stadium: Parc des Princes; Attendance: 44,768; Referee: Antony Gautier

22 December 2012 19	Lyon	3–0	Nice	Lyon
20:00 CET	López 40'; Réveillère 56'; Gomis 77' (pen.); Lovren (yellow card) 78' (yellow-red card) 90'	Report		Stadium: Stade de Gerland; Attendance: 30,903; Referee: Amaury Delerue

12 January 2013 20	Troyes	1–2	Lyon	Troyes
17:00 CET	Nivet 38'	Report	Gonalons 11'; Umtiti 75'	Stadium: Stade de l'Aube; Attendance: 13,481; Referee: Olivier Thual

18 January 2013 21	Lyon	0–0	Evian	Lyon
20:30 CET		Report		Stadium: Stade de Gerland; Attendance: 30,813; Referee: Ruddy Buquet

25 January 2013 22	Valenciennes	0–2	Lyon	Valenciennes
20:30 CET		Report	Fofana 8'; Gomis 28'	Stadium: Stade du Hainaut; Attendance: 14,412; Referee: Clément Turpin

3 February 2013 23	Ajaccio	3–1	Lyon	Ajaccio
14:00 CET	Belghazouani 57'; Mutu 65', 90+2' (pen.)	Report	Lacazette 53'; Lovren (red card) 90'	Stadium: Stade François Coty; Attendance: 6,987; Referee: Lionel Jaffredo

10 February 2013 24	Lyon	1–3	Lille	Lyon
21:00 CET	López 57' (pen.)	Report	Chedjou 28'; Balmont 45'; Kalou 50'	Stadium: Stade de Gerland; Attendance: 30,705; Referee: Laurent Duhamel

16 February 2013 25	Bordeaux	0–4	Lyon	Bordeaux
17:00 CET		Report	Grenier 15', 73' (pen.); Fofana 65'; Lacazette 75'	Stadium: Stade Chaban-Delmas; Attendance: 27,240; Referee: Nicolas Rainville

24 February 2013 26	Lyon	3–1	Lorient	Lyon
14:00 CET	López 24'; Ghezzal 50'; Mvuemba 90+2'	Report	Aliadière 11'	Stadium: Stade de Gerland; Attendance: 30,343; Referee: Philippe Kalt

2 March 2013 27	Brest	1–1	Lyon	Brest
17:00 CET	Chafni 8'	Report	Makonda 53' (o.g.)	Stadium: Stade Francis-Le Blé; Attendance: 11,924; Referee: Saïd Ennjimi

10 March 2013 28	Lyon	0–0	Marseille	Lyon
21:00 CET		Report		Stadium: Stade de Gerland; Attendance: 38,819; Referee: Clément Turpin

16 March 2013 29	Bastia	4–1	Lyon	Furiani
17:00 CET	Thauvin 45', 61'; Modeste 56'; Khazri 87'	Report	López 54'	Stadium: Stade Armand Cesari; Attendance: 12,224; Referee: Laurent Duhamel

31 March 2013 30	Lyon	1–2	Sochaux	Lyon
21:00 CET	Gomis 68' (pen.)	Report	Sio 50'; Bakambu 88'	Stadium: Stade de Gerland; Attendance: 34,696; Referee: Benoît Millot

7 April 2013 31	Reims	1–0	Lyon	Reims
17:00 CEST	Krychowiak 53' (pen.)	Report	Biševac (red card) 51'	Stadium: Stade Auguste Delaune; Attendance: 20,298; Referee: Olivier Thual

14 April 2013 32	Lyon	3–1	Toulouse	Lyon
17:00 CEST	Grenier 8'; Koné 49'; Gomis 63'	Report	Ben Yedder 28'	Stadium: Stade de Gerland; Attendance: 34,678; Referee: Nicolas Rainville

19 April 2013 33	Montpellier	1–2	Lyon	Montpellier
20:30 CEST	Belhanda 41'	Report	López 29'; Grenier 90+3'	Stadium: Stade de la Mosson; Attendance: 19,572; Referee: Sébastien Moreira

28 April 2013 34	Lyon	1–1	Saint-Étienne	Lyon
14:00 CEST	Gourcuff 54'	Report	Zouma 29'	Stadium: Stade de Gerland; Attendance: 38,845; Referee: Laurent Duhamel

5 May 2013 35	Nancy	0–3	Lyon	Tomblaine
17:00 CEST		Report	Gomis 48', 89'; Gourcuff 80'	Stadium: Stade Marcel Picot; Attendance: 19,115; Referee: Lionel Jaffredo

12 May 2013 36	Lyon	0–1	Paris Saint-Germain	Lyon
21:00 CEST		Report	Ménez 53'	Stadium: Stade de Gerland; Attendance: 39,939; Referee: Stéphane Lannoy

19 May 2013 37	Nice	1–1	Lyon	Nice
15:05 CEST	Cvitanich 47' (pen.)	Report	Gonalons (yellow card) 65' (yellow-red card) 73'; Grenier 76'	Stadium: Stade du Ray; Attendance: 15,492; Referee: Clément Turpin

26 May 2013 38	Lyon	2–0	Rennes	Lyon
21:00 CEST	López 23' (pen.); Grenier 69'	Report		Stadium: Stade de Gerland; Attendance: 38,705; Referee: Philippe Kalt

=== Coupe de France ===
5 January 2013 Round of 64	Épinal	3–3 (a.e.t.) (4–2 p)	Lyon	Épinal
14:15 CET	Boubaya 10', 13'; Focki 76'		Gomis 15'; Fofana 20'; López 61'	Stadium: Stade de la Colombière; Attendance: 7,149; Referee: Philippe Kalt
	Penalties
	Chéré (penalty scored); Chouleur (penalty scored); Do (penalty missed); Doukouré (penalty scored); Diedhiou (penalty scored)		(penalty scored) Bastos; (penalty missed) Fofana; (penalty missed) Koné; (penalty scored) López

=== Coupe de la Ligue ===
31 October 2012 Round of 16	Nice	3–1	Lyon	Nice
17:00 CET	Eysseric 6' (pen.); Traoré 9'; Civelli 15'	Report	Gomis 7'	Stadium: Stade du Ray; Attendance: 8,466; Referee: Nicolas Rainville

=== UEFA Europa League ===
==== Group stage ====
Pos	Team	Pld	W	D	L	GF	GA	GD	Pts	Qualification
1	(France) Lyon	6	5	1	0	14	8	+6	16	Advance to knockout phase
2	(Czech Republic) Sparta Prague	6	2	3	1	9	6	+3	9	Advance to knockout phase
3	(Spain) Athletic Bilbao	6	1	2	3	7	9	−2	5	
4	(Israel) Ironi Kiryat Shmona	6	0	2	4	6	13	−7	2	

Source: Soccerway

20 September 2012 1	Lyon (France)	2–1	(Czech Republic) Sparta Prague	Lyon, France
21:05 CEST	Gomis 59'; López 62'	Report	Krejčí 77'	Stadium: Stade de Gerland; Attendance: 41,842; Referee: Serhiy Boiko (Ukraine)

4 October 2012 2	Ironi Kiryat Shmona (Israel)	3–4	(France) Lyon	Haifa, Israel
19:00 CEST	Abuhatzira 7', 66' (pen.); Levi 51'	Report	Fofana 17', 90+2'; Monzón 22'; Réveillère 31'	Stadium: Kiryat Eliezer Stadium^{1} Attendance: 2,500; Referee: Artur Soares Dias (Portugal)

25 October 2012 3	Lyon (France)	2–1	(Spain) Athletic Bilbao	Lyon, France
19:00 CEST	López 54'; Briand 86'	Report	Ibai 79'	Stadium: Stade de Gerland; Attendance: 30,587; Referee: Andre Marriner (England)

8 November 2012 4	Athletic Bilbao (Spain)	2–3	(France) Lyon	Bilbao, Spain
21:05 CET	Herrera 48'; Aduriz 55' (pen.)	Report	Gomis 22'; Gourcuff 45+1'; Lacazette 63'	Stadium: San Mamés; Attendance: 24,465; Referee: Pol van Boekel (Netherlands)

22 November 2012 5	Sparta Prague (Czech Republic)	1–1	(France) Lyon	Prague, Czech Republic
19:00 CET	Hušbauer 53'	Report	Benzia 46'	Stadium: Generali Arena; Attendance: 17,121; Referee: Anastassios Kakos (Greece)

6 December 2012 6	Lyon (France)	2–0	(Israel) Ironi Kiryat Shmona	Lyon, France
21:05 CET	Sarr 15'; Benzia 58'	Report		Stadium: Stade de Gerland; Attendance: 29,087; Referee: Halis Özkahya (Turkey)

- Note 1: Ironi Kiryat Shmona played their home matches at Kiryat Eliezer Stadium, Haifa instead of their regular stadium, Municipal Stadium, Kiryat Shmona.

==== Knockout phase ====
===== Round of 32 =====
14 February 2013 First leg	Tottenham Hotspur (England)	2–1	(France) Lyon	London, England
21:05 CET	Bale 45', 90+3'	Report	Umtiti 55'	Stadium: White Hart Lane; Attendance: 31,762; Referee: Pedro Proença (Portugal)

21 February 2013 Second leg	Lyon (France)	1–1 (2–3 agg.)	(England) Tottenham Hotspur	Lyon, France
19:00 CET	Gonalons 17'	Report	Dembélé 90'	Stadium: Stade de Gerland; Attendance: 38,761; Referee: Wolfgang Stark (Germany)
