= Genet (surname) =

Genet or Genêt is a French surname. Notable people with this surname include the following:

- Alexis Genet (born 1982), French footballer
- Edmond Genet (1896–1917), American aviator
- Edmond-Charles Genêt or Citizen Genêt (1763–1834) French envoy to the United States appointed by the Girondins during the French Revolution
- Guy Genet (born 1955), French footballer
- Henry W. Genet (1828–1889), New York politician
- Jean Genet (1910–1986), French writer
- Jean-Philippe Genet (born 1944), French historian
- Joseph Genet (1914–1999), New Zealand wrestler
- Michael Genet (born 1958), American actor and screenwriter
- Ray Genet or Pirate (1931–1979), Alaskan mountaineer
- Russell Merle Genet (born 1940), American astronomer
