= Cyriaque Mayounga =

Association football player (born 2000)

Cyriaque Mayounga-Ngolou
Personal information
- Full name: Cyriaque-Yanis Mayounga Ngolou
- Date of birth: 4 October 2000 (age 26)
- Place of birth: Lyon, France
- Height: 1.88 m (6 ft 2 in)
- Position: Defender

Youth career
- 2012–2019: Lyon

Senior career*
Years	Team	Apps	(Gls)
2018–2019	Lyon B	4	(0)
2019–2021	Wolverhampton Wanderers	0	(0)
2022	Senica	7	(0)
2022	Dukla Banska Bystrica	2	(0)

International career^{‡}
2017–	Central African Republic	5	(0)
- * Club domestic league appearances and goals as of 5 January 2023 ‡ National team caps and goals as of 18 November 2017

Cyriaque Mayounga-Ngolou (born 4 October 2000) is a professional footballer who plays as a defender. Born in France, he plays for the Central African Republic national team.

== Club career ==
On 9 September 2022, it was announced that Mayounga would be leaving Senica for first division club Dukla Banská Bystrica. He made his debut for the club in a 3–1 win over Zemplin Michalovce, coming onto the game as a substitute in the 69” minute for Ľubomír Willwéber. Mayounga would go on to make only one more appearances for the club before being released.

== International career ==
Mayounga-Ngolou was born in Lyon to a Central African father, and Moroccan mother. At the age of 17 years and one month, Mayounga become the youngest ever player of Central African Republic on 14 November 2017, making his international debut in a friendly 3–0 loss to Algeria coming in as a late sub replacing his Olympique Lyonnais teammate Dylan Mboumbouni.

== Career statistics ==
=== Club ===
As of match played 4 November 2022

Appearances and goals by club, season and competition
Club	Season	League			National cup		League cup		Other		Total	
Club	Season	Division	Apps	Goals	Apps	Goals	Apps	Goals	Apps	Goals	Apps	Goals
Lyon II	2018–19	Championnat National 2	4	0	—		—		—		4	0
Wolverhampton Wanderers	2019–20	Premier League	0	0	0	0	0	0	0	0	0	0
Wolverhampton Wanderers	2020–21	Premier League	0	0	0	0	0	0	0	0	0	0
Senica	2021–22	Niké liga	7	0	4	0	—		—		11	0
Dukla Banská Bystrica	2022–23	Niké liga	2	0	1	0	—		—		3	0
Career total			13	0	5	0	0	0	0	0	18	0

=== International ===
As of match played 5 June 2022

Appearances and goals by national team and year
National team	Year	Apps	Goals
Central African Republic	2017	1	0
Central African Republic	2018	1	0
Central African Republic	2022	3	0
Total		5	0
