= Bryan Ngwabije =

Rwandan footballer (born 1998)

Personal information
- Full name: Bryan-Clovis Ngwabije
- Date of birth: 30 May 1998 (age 28)
- Place of birth: Lyon, France
- Height: 1.84 m (6 ft 0 in)
- Position: Centre-back

Team information
- Current team: Andrézieux
- Number: 6

Youth career
- Lyon

Senior career*
Years	Team	Apps	(Gls)
2016–2018	Lyon B	8	(1)
2018–2019	Andrézieux	15	(0)
2019–2020	Guingamp B	14	(0)
2020	Sporting Lyon B	1	(0)
2020–2022	Sporting Lyon	42	(0)
2022–2024	Andrézieux	24	(0)
2024–	Blois	1	(0)

International career
2021–	Rwanda	1	(0)
- * Club domestic league appearances and goals as of 22:02, 21 August 2024 (UTC)

Bryan-Clovis Ngwabije (born 30 May 1998) is a professional footballer who plays as a centre-back for Championnat National 1 club Blois. Born in France, he plays for the Rwanda national team.

== Club career ==
A youth product of Lyon, Ngwabije began his career with their reserve side, before stints with Andrézieux and Guingamp II. On 6 June 2020, he transferred to Sporting Lyon in the Championnat National.

== International career ==
Born in France, Ngwabije is of Rwandan descent. He was called up to represent the Rwanda national team for friendlies in June 2021. He debuted for Rwanda in a 2–0 friendly win over the Central African Republic on 3 June 2021.
