= Mourad Benhamida =

French footballer (born 1986)

Personal information
- Date of birth: 18 January 1986 (age 40)
- Place of birth: Villeurbanne, France
- Height: 1.76 m (5 ft 9 in)
- Position: Right-back

Youth career
- 1999–2006: Lyon

Senior career*
Years	Team	Apps	(Gls)
2006–2007	Lyon	0	(0)
2007–2010	Montpellier	32	(1)
2011–2012	Lyon Duchère	8	(0)
2012–2013	Club Africain	0	(0)
2014–2015	Monts d'Or Azergues Foot	14	(0)
2017–2019	FC Vaulx-en-Velin		
2019–2021	Vénissieux		
2021–2022	FC Lyon		

International career
2004–2005	France U18		
2006	France U21		
- * Club domestic league appearances and goals

Mourad Benhamida (born 18 January 1986) is a French former professional footballer who played as right-back.

== Career ==
=== Lyon ===
Born in Villeurbanne, Rhône, Benhamida was trained in the youth sections and player development program of Lyon.

He was known for his prowess in the ranks of the Lyon's junior amateur team, playing in the CFA 2 that he captained. In April 2006, Lyon's president Jean-Michel Aulas announced that Benhamida would sign a one-year professional contract with the club alongside fellow young hope and France U-18 international Grégory Bettiol. Both helped their team win the second division Amateur Championship to get promoted in the CFA.

He was considered as a part of the young generation of players formed by Lyon, who were signed by the club, sometimes before being sold to other outfits, like: Jérémy Berthod, Karim Benzema, Hatem Ben Arfa, Bryan Bergougnoux, Grégory Bettiol, and Jérémy Clément.

=== Montpellier ===
Benhamida, after receiving little playing time with Lyon, transferred to Montpellier HSC on a Bosman transfer. He made his debut as a late-match substitute in Montpellier's 3–1 win over Libourne. He scored his first goal on 17 August 2007 against Troyes in Montpellier's 3–0 victory.

== Honours ==
- Champion de France des réserves: 2006
- Coupe Gambardella finalist: 2005
- Champion de France 18 ans: 2005
