= Clément Grenier =

French footballer (born 1991)

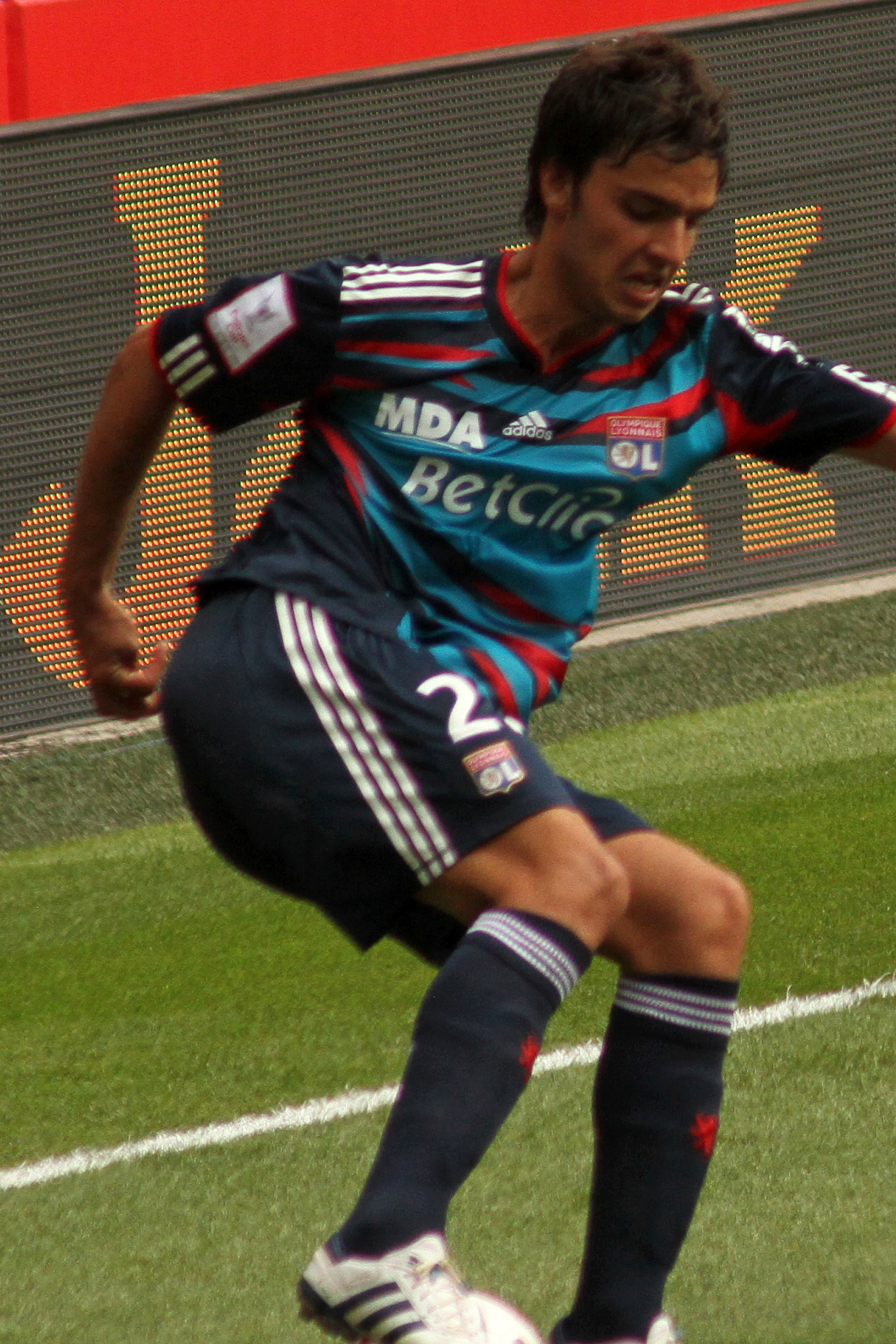
- Grenier playing for Lyon in 2010

Personal information
- Full name: Clément Jean Camille Grenier
- Date of birth: 7 January 1991 (age 35)
- Place of birth: Annonay, Ardèche, France
- Height: 1.86 m (6 ft 1 in)
- Position: Attacking midfielder

Youth career
- 1997–2002: FC Annonay
- 2002–2009: Lyon

Senior career*
Years	Team	Apps	(Gls)
2008–2017	Lyon B	50	(10)
2009–2018	Lyon	116	(14)
2017	→ Roma (loan)	6	(0)
2018	Guingamp	15	(5)
2018–2021	Rennes	67	(7)
2022–2023	Mallorca	26	(1)
2023–2024	Racing Santander	24	(1)

International career
2009–2010	France U19	13	(1)
2010–2011	France U20	11	(2)
2012	France U21	5	(0)
2013–2014	France	5	(0)
Medal record
Men's football
Representing France
UEFA European Under-17 Championship
Runner-up	2008 Turkey
- * Club domestic league appearances and goals as of 6 June 2024

Clément Jean Camille Grenier (born 7 January 1991) is a French professional footballer. He has also represented France at senior and across all youth levels.

Grenier plays in central midfield, as well as in the attacking midfield position just behind the striker. He is known for his technical ability, dribbling, and free-kick taking.

== Early life ==
Grenier was born in Annonay, Ardèche.

== Club career ==
=== Early career ===
Grenier began his career with his hometown club FC Annonay starring with the club's under-9 team. He helped the club reach the departmental final of the National Cup for under-9 players. Grenier later drew interest from Lyon, whose scouts informed the youngster to continue his great play in order to join the club at a later date. In July 2002, he secured a move to Lyon, joining the club's youth academy.

=== Lyon ===
Grenier continued his development, becoming one of the club's best prospects. He attracted interest from Spanish club Real Madrid, English clubs Arsenal and Chelsea, and Italian club Inter Milan, whose scouts likened the player to Brazilian international Kaká. Despite the interest, Grenier along with fellow youth player Yannis Tafer, signed his first professional contract on 15 May 2008, agreeing to a three-year deal.

Though Grenier was on the senior team and featured in several pre-season matches ahead of the 2008–09 season, he spent the majority of the campaign playing with the reserve team in the Championnat de France Amateur, the fourth division of French football. Grenier played in 16 league matches and scored his only goal against Agde. He also played in the 2008–09 edition of the Coupe Gambardella appearing in seven matches and scoring three goals as the squad reach the semi-finals. Due to tendinitis of the patella, he did not play in any matches with the senior team.

Grenier began the 2009–10 season with the reserve team. He scored on his debut against Gap. On 26 September, he made his senior debut in a 2–1 league win against Toulouse, appearing as a substitute for Bafétimbi Gomis.

On 14 October 2011, Grenier signed a new contract tying him to the club until June 2014.

On 10 April 2012, during the semi-final of the Coupe de France against Gazélec Ajaccio, he scored his first goal with the professional team (4–0). He win the Coupe de France on 28 April 2012 against Quevilly (1–0), entering the game for the last 24 minutes. This is his first professional trophy with Lyon. During the summer, he won the France Supercup in New York against Montpellier. He scored his first goal in Ligue 1 against Valenciennes on 1 September 2012. On 17 February 2013, he scored a double against Bordeaux, his first in Ligue 1. In the spring of 2013, he helped his team win the third place in Ligue 1, which offers a place in the Champions League for the fourteenth time in fifteen years for Lyon. With a goal at the end of the game (93rd) in Montpellier on matchday 33, he gave OL a 2–1 victory. On matchday 37, he scores a long free kick in Nice to tie the game at 1–1. Finally, on the final matchday, he freed Gerland from a free-kick, his second consecutive, recalling those of Juninho Pernambucano, which then allowed Lyon to ensure the victory and thus to keep his third place after his success against Rennes (2–0). Clément Grenier then received a first convocation with the France national team.

Amid interest by Arsenal over his availability for transfer, Grenier extended his contract by a further two years on 11 June 2013.

On 29 January 2014, it was widely reported that Premier League club Newcastle United had made a 'substantial' bid for Grenier. Grenier injured his abductors in March, with his recovery delayed by an infection. At the end of his recovery, he revealed that he was not far from losing the use of his legs. On 30 March, he was present in the stands during the loss in the Derby du Rhône to Saint-Étienne and was suspended two matches for insulting the referee after the match front of the locker room. Grenier returned against Marseille on but could not prevent a 4–2 defeat. On the last matchday of the season, his free kick set Bakary Koné up for the only goal in the game against Nice to help Lyon qualify for the Europa League.

On 21 August 2014, Grenier made his first appearance of the 2014–15 season coming on as a 76th-minute substitute in the Europa League play-off match against Astra Giurgiu but left the pitch with the same groin injury that ruled him out of the latter part of the previous season and the 2014 World Cup at the final whistle. He returned to training in mid-November but couldn't play before April 2015 and returned on against Bastia and delivered an assist to Mohamed Yattara to help Lyon beat Bastia 2–0.

On 25 July 2015, in a pre-season match against Arsenal, he injured his leg in the first period and had to give up his place. Returning to Lyon to pass additional examinations, he learns that it suffers from a total rupture of the quadriceps of the left leg. He made his return on the pitch with the reserve team of Lyon at the end of November. A few days later, the offensive midfielder came into play in a 4–2 defeat against Montpellier. On 9 January 2016, the day of the inauguration of the new OL stadium, he served Lacazette who opened the scoring against Troyes. On the 35th day, he scored an important free-kick against Toulouse which allowed OL to return to the game before winning 3–2 at the end of the game.

During the first part of the 2016–17 season, although not injured, he did not start any game and played only 35 minutes in Ligue 1 and 12 minutes in the Champions League.

==== Roma (loan) ====
On 28 January 2017, he joined Serie A side Roma on loan until the end of the 2016–17 season with an option for a permanent move. On 7 February 2017, Grenier made his debut for the Giallorossi in a 4–0 Serie A home win over Fiorentina, appearing as a substitute for Radja Nainggolan in the 89th minute. On 12 March, he delivered an assist for Stephan El Shaarawy in his first Serie A start in a 3–0 away victory over Palermo. Grenier played only six competitive matches (all of them in Serie A) for Roma and started only one of them during his half-season loan spell there. On 14 June 2017, Lyon announced that Grenier would return to Lyon as a replacement of Corentin Tolisso, as Roma did not excise their option to sign Grenier on a permanent basis.

=== Guingamp ===
On 31 January 2018, Grenier signed a year and a half contract with fellow Ligue 1 side En Avant de Guingamp. On 11 May 2018, Grenier scored two goals, including a penalty, in the 3–3 Ligue 1 home draw against Marseille.

=== Rennes ===
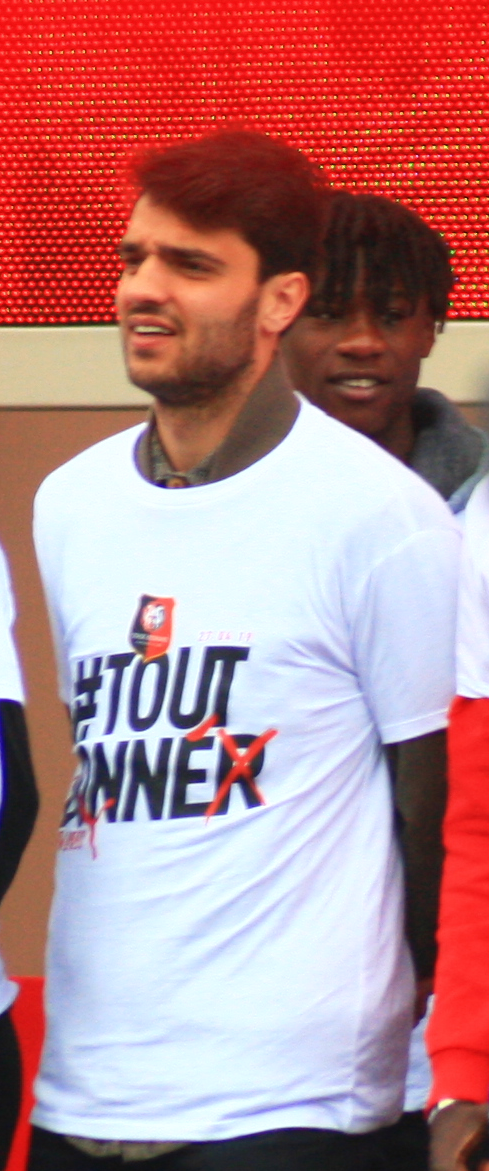
Grenier after his victory with Rennes in the 2018–19 Coupe de France

On 24 July 2018, Grenier signed a three-year contract with fellow Breton team Rennes.

=== Mallorca ===
On 3 March 2022, Grenier signed a contract with La Liga side Mallorca until the end of the season. On 1 September 2023, he terminated his contract with the club.

=== Racing Santander ===
On 1 September 2023, hours after leaving Mallorca, Grenier signed a one-year deal with Racing de Santander in the second division.

== International career ==
=== Youth ===
Grenier has featured for all of France's national youth teams beginning with the under-16 team making his debut in the team's 0–0 draw with Poland on 13 March 2007. In the return match in Saint-Aubin-lès-Elbeuf, Grenier assisted on two goals in the team's 5–0 victory. He scored his first and only goal for the team on 3 April in the team's opening group stage match against Cameroon in the Montaigu Tournament. France won the match 2–0.

With the under-17 team, Grenier was a regular and scored on his debut in a 4–0 victory over Switzerland. Grenier scored a hat-trick in the team's 6–0 thrashing of Albania in the first qualifying round of the 2008 UEFA European Under-17 Championship. At the Algarve Cup in Portugal, he helped the team to second place by scoring a brace in the team's 4–2 win against Denmark. Grenier scored his only goal against Israel in a second group stage match. France finished the round unbeaten and qualified for the tournament. During the Championship, Grenier scored in a 3–3 draw with Spain, converting on a curling free-kick in the 43rd minute. France later reached the final where they were defeated 4–0 by Spain.

With the under-18 team, Grenier made his debut in a match against Ukraine. Grenier failed to score in seven appearances.

For under-19 duty, Grenier was called up by coach Francis Smerecki, making his first appearance with the team at the 2009 edition of the Sendaï Cup. He scored his only goal for the team in the Tournio de Limoges against Greece in a 3–3 draw. On 7 June 2010, Grenier was named in the 18-man squad for the 2010 UEFA European Under-19 Championship. He missed a penalty in the opening 4–1 victory over the Dutch. Despite missing the team's final two matches, Grenier became a European champion following a 2–1 comeback victory against Spain in the final. The title was the country's second UEFA Under-19 championship.

Due to France's victory at the UEFA Under-19 Championship, the nation qualified for the 2011 FIFA U-20 World Cup. On 7 October 2010, he made his debut with the under-20 team in a friendly match against Portugal. Grenier scored the equalising third goal in a 3–3 draw. On 9 February 2011, he scored the opening goal for France in a 2–1 win over England. He appeared in two more matches with the team during the 2010–11 campaign. On 10 June 2011, Grenier was named in the 21-man squad for the U-20 World Cup. He made his tournament debut as a substitute in a 4–1 defeat to hosts Colombia on 30 July 2011. He gave 3 assists during the competition as France finishes at the fourth place.

=== Senior ===
Grenier received his first senior call-up by Didier Deschamps as a replacement for the injured Samir Nasri in May 2013. On 5 June 2013, he made his international debut in a friendly against Uruguay, earning his second cap against Brazil a few days later.

On 13 May 2014, he was named in France's squad for the 2014 FIFA World Cup in Brazil. He withdrew with injury six days prior to the tournament and was replaced by Morgan Schneiderlin.

== Career statistics ==
=== Club ===
As of match played 17 April 2023

Appearances and goals by club, season and competition
Club	Season	League			National cup (Note: Includes Coupe de France, Copa del Rey)		League cup (Note: Includes Coupe de la Ligue)		Europe		Other		Total	
Club	Season	Division	Apps	Goals	Apps	Goals	Apps	Goals	Apps	Goals	Apps	Goals	Apps	Goals
Lyon	2009–10	Ligue 1	3	0	0	0	0	0	0	0	—		3	0
Lyon	2010–11	Ligue 1	7	0	1	0	1	0	0	0	—		9	0
Lyon	2011–12	Ligue 1	21	0	4	1	3	0	2 (Note: Appearance(s) in UEFA Champions League)	0	—		30	1
Lyon	2012–13	Ligue 1	28	7	0	0	0	0	5 (Note: Appearance(s) in UEFA Europa League)	0	0	0	33	7
Lyon	2013–14	Ligue 1	28	4	2	1	2	0	9 (Note: Four appearances and one goal in UEFA Champions League, five appearances and one goal in UEFA Europa League)	2	—		41	7
Lyon	2014–15	Ligue 1	6	1	0	0	0	0	1	0	—		7	1
Lyon	2015–16	Ligue 1	18	2	2	0	2	0	1	0	0	0	23	2
Lyon	2016–17	Ligue 1	4	0	0	0	1	0	1	0	0	0	6	0
Lyon	2017–18	Ligue 1	1	0	0	0	1	0	0	0	—		2	0
Lyon	Total		116	14	9	2	10	0	19	2	0	0	154	18
Roma (loan)	2016–17	Serie A	6	0	0	0	—		0	0	—		6	0
Guingamp	2017–18	Ligue 1	15	5	0	0	0	0	—		—		15	5
Rennes	2018–19	Ligue 1	33	2	5	0	1	0	9	2	—		48	4
Rennes	2019–20	Ligue 1	11	1	1	0	0	0	4	0	1 (Note: Appearance in Trophée des Champions)	0	17	1
Rennes	2020–21	Ligue 1	23	4	0	0	0	0	5	0	—		28	4
Rennes	Total		67	7	6	0	1	0	18	2	1	0	93	9
Mallorca	2021–22	La Liga	5	1	0	0	—		—		—		5	1
Mallorca	2022–23	La Liga	16	0	3	1	—		—		—		19	1
Mallorca	Total		21	1	3	1	—		—		—		24	2
Career total			225	27	18	3	11	0	37	4	1	0	292	34

=== International ===
Appearances and goals by national team and year
National team	Year	Apps	Goals
France
France	2013	3	0
France	2014	2	0
Total		5	0

== Honours ==
Lyon

- Coupe de France: 2011–12
- Trophée des Champions: 2012

Stade Rennais

- Coupe de France: 2018–19
