= Steed Malbranque =

French footballer (born 1980)

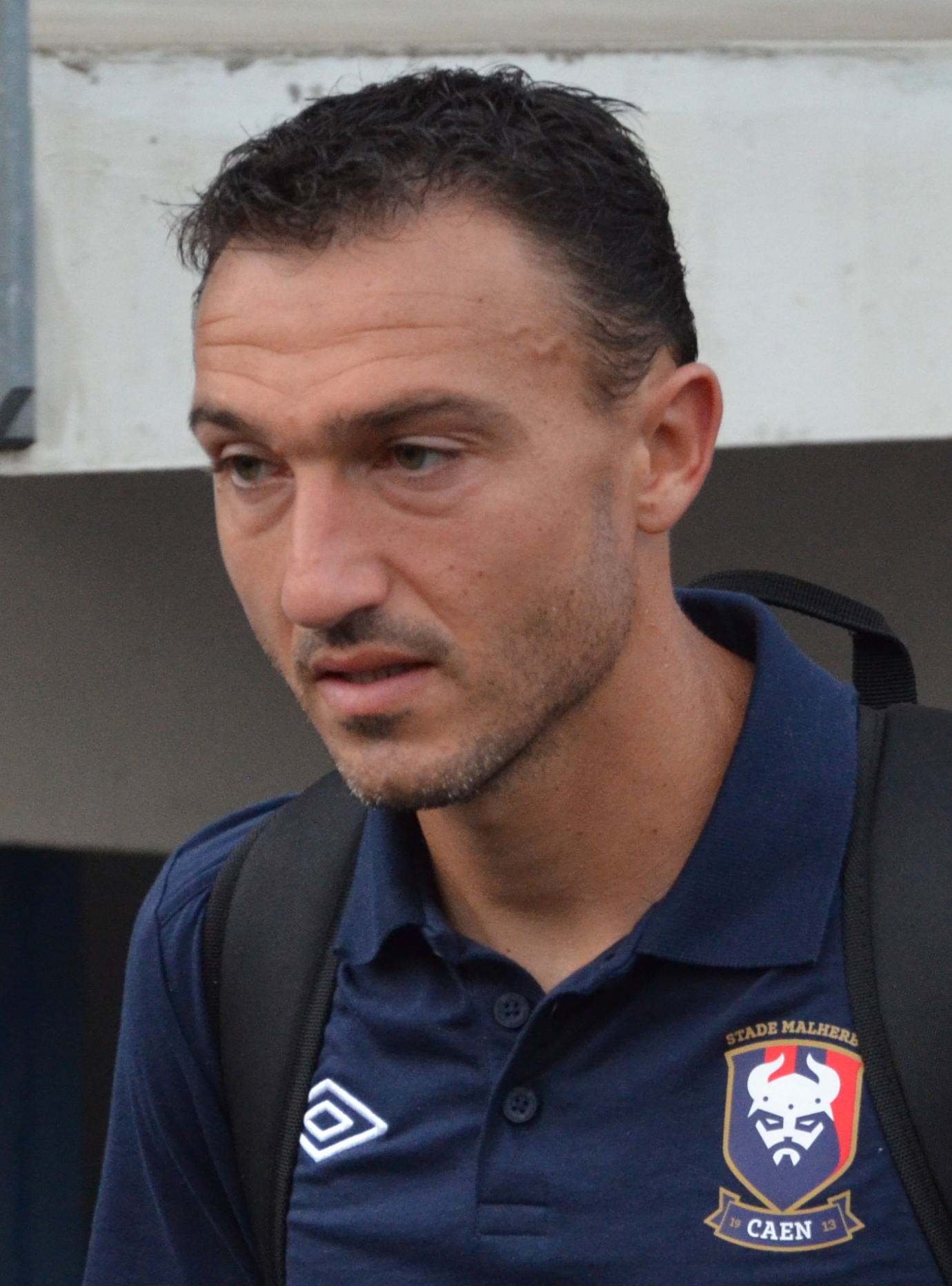
- Malbranque in 2016

Personal information
- Full name: Steed Claude Malbranque
- Date of birth: 6 January 1980 (age 46)
- Place of birth: Mouscron, Belgium
- Height: 1.71 m (5 ft 7 in)
- Position: Midfielder

Youth career
- –1991: U.S Oyonnax
- 1991–1994: Montpellier
- 1994–1997: Lyon

Senior career*
Years	Team	Apps	(Gls)
1997–2001	Lyon	77	(9)
2001–2006	Fulham	172	(32)
2006–2008	Tottenham Hotspur	62	(6)
2008–2011	Sunderland	102	(1)
2011	Saint-Étienne	1	(0)
2012–2016	Lyon	93	(6)
2016–2017	Caen	13	(0)
2016–2017	Caen II	2	(1)
2017–2019	Chasselay MDA	20	(1)
2020–2022	Limonest	2	(0)
Total		544	(56)

International career
2000–2002	France U21	21	(9)
Medal record
Men's football
Representing France
UEFA European Under-21 Championship
Runner-up	2002
- * Club domestic league appearances and goals

Steed Claude Malbranque (born 6 January 1980) is a former professional footballer who principally played as a winger or attacking midfielder. During his second spell at Lyon he also played as a central midfielder. Born in Belgium, Malbranque represented France at international level.

Malbranque started his professional career with Lyon, before moving to England in 2001, where he had spells with Fulham, Tottenham Hotspur and Sunderland. He returned to France in 2011 for a short spell with Saint-Étienne. In 2012, he joined Lyon for the second time. At Tottenham, he became one of 17 Spurs players to manage 50 games in a single season.

== Club career ==
=== Lyon ===
He was a trainee at Lyon youth academy between 1995 and 1997, during which time he won the Under-15 championship twice, the Under-17 Cup and the reserve team championship. He also captained the French Under-18 side.

He made his professional debut for the club in a 1–1 draw against Montpellier on 21 February 1998 aged 18. He went on to play a total of 96 games for the club, which included 12 appearances and two goals in the Champions League and seven appearances in the UEFA Cup.

Malbranque was an unused substitute in the final as Lyon won the 2001 French Coupe de la Ligue.

During his time at the club, there was a chance to join English club Arsenal after impressing in a Champions League tie at Highbury and the following tie, a 3–0 victory over Bayern Munich at Stade de Gerland. He rejected the move as he felt he was not ready to play in the Premier League.

=== Fulham ===
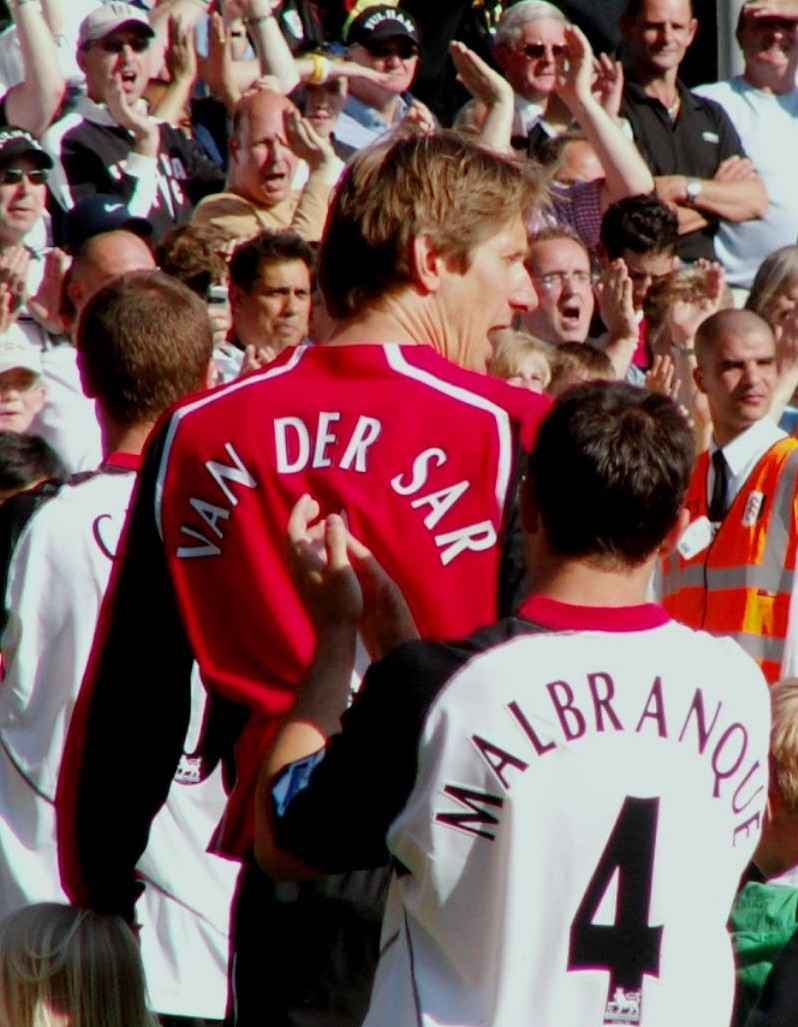
Malbranque (right) playing for Fulham in 2005

He eventually made his move to the Premier League in 2001, joining Fulham for a fee believed to be £4.5 million, making his debut in a 3–2 defeat at Old Trafford against Manchester United. He went on to score 10 goals in his first season. As a result, making an impressive display in his first season at Fulham, Malbranque was described by Christian Damiano, who has kept track of Malbranque's development since he was 13-year-old, as "the number 10 position that Zidane excels at Fulham".

He became a firm favourite during his five years at the club, playing a total of 211 games and scoring 44 goals, including six appearances and three goals in Fulham's short-lived UEFA Cup campaign in the 2002–03 season. He was the top scorer that season with 13 goals that helped save Fulham from relegation. He was offered the chance to play for Belgium towards the end of the campaign, having not represented the full France side; however, he turned it down with the hope that he would eventually break into the full French squad. He scored in Fulham's 3–1 win over Manchester United at Old Trafford in October 2003. During the same month, Malbranque would sign a new four-year contract to keep him at Craven Cottage until 2007.

On 13 May 2006, after extensive contract talks with the club failed, Malbranque was placed on the transfer list at Fulham after he declared his intention to leave at the end of his contract. There was rumoured interest from Reading, Middlesbrough, West Ham United, Manchester City, Everton and Newcastle United, but he opted to sign for Tottenham Hotspur on the deadline day of the transfer window (31 August) for a fee believed to be £2 million, despite an injury that would keep him out for approximately 10 weeks.

=== Tottenham Hotspur ===
Malbranque made his debut for Tottenham Hotspur almost 10 weeks after signing for the club on 8 November at White Hart Lane playing 63 minutes in a League Cup 3–1 victory over Port Vale. He had been unable to play earlier than that after a non-essential groin operation.

He scored his first goal for Spurs in an emphatic 5–1 victory over Charlton Athletic at White Hart Lane on 9 December. Malbranque became a fan favourite at Tottenham because of his strong work ethic. Malbranque finished the 2007–08 season in the top five in the Premier League for tackles made and tackles per minute, demonstrating his work ethic and tackling ability.

He scored Tottenham's 150th goal in European competition with his goal in the second leg of the UEFA Cup last 16 against Sporting Braga on 14 March 2007 at White Hart Lane. On 12 April 2007, during the second leg of the UEFA Cup quarter-final against defending champions Sevilla, Malbranque famously scored an anomalous own goal. A Sevilla corner was met with a header from Christian Poulsen. The ball appeared to be going wide of the goal until Malbranque took a wild lash at the ball to clear it and keep it in play. The ball was sliced backwards into Spurs' own net. The match ended in a 2–2 draw, but Sevilla went through to the next round on 4–3 aggregate.

He started for Spurs as they won the 2008 Football League Cup Final against Chelsea.

=== Sunderland ===
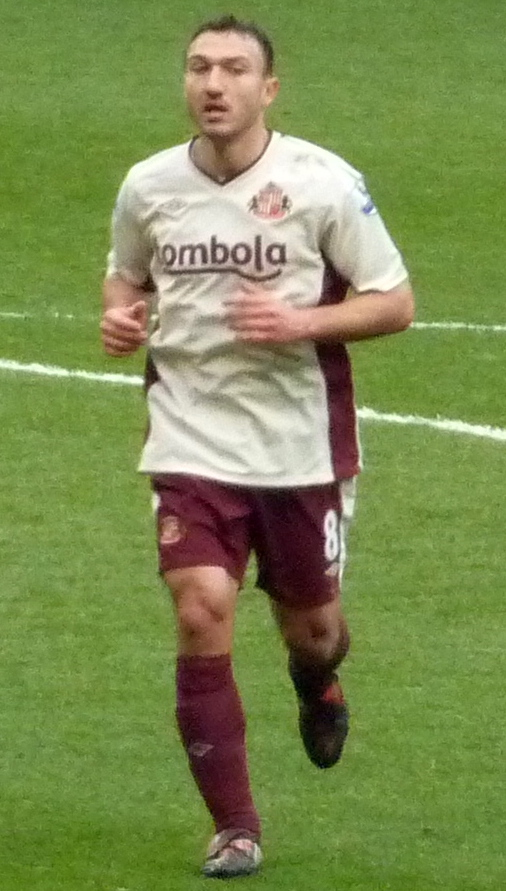
Malbranque playing for Sunderland in 2011

Malbranque followed teammates Pascal Chimbonda and Teemu Tainio to Sunderland. Malbranque signed a four-year contract on 30 July 2008. He went on to score his first goal for the club with the first goal in Sunderland's 4–1 victory over Hull City at the KC Stadium. Malbranque enjoyed his best form in a Sunderland shirt during the 2009–10 season, proving fruitful on the left wing as opposed to the right. He scored his second Sunderland goal in their FA Cup third round victory over non-league Barrow. His run of form helped Sunderland climb the table after a positive streak of results mid-season.

Malbranque remained at Sunderland for the 2010–11 season, moving into a more central role to accommodate loan signing Danny Welbeck. He featured in Sunderland's early seven match unbeaten run, which included games against Manchester City, Arsenal, Liverpool and Manchester United. Malbranque missed a penalty in Sunderland's 2–0 victory against Stoke City. On 1 February 2011, he made his 100th appearance for Sunderland playing against Chelsea at the Stadium of Light.

Malbranque became a fan favourite during his time with Sunderland but in the 2011 summer transfer window it was revealed that he was in advanced talks with French team Saint-Étienne with a view to joining them. His manager at Sunderland, Steve Bruce, stated he was surplus to requirements, and it was also revealed his transfer would free up funds for new summer signings as well as cut their wage bill.

=== Saint-Étienne ===
On 3 August 2011, it was announced Malbranque had signed with French side AS Saint-Étienne on a two-year contract, thus ending a 10-year stay in English football. A month after joining, rumours circulated that Malbranque had asked to be released from his contract due his son being ill with cancer. Malbranque eventually released a statement issued by London-based solicitors Thomas Cooper denying this:

"Steed has read with concern the recent stories currently circulating about him and his family, He would like to reassure all of his friends in England and throughout world football that these stories are wholly without foundation. Steed does not have a son and his immediate family are all in good health. Steed does not know the origin of these stories but would like to stress that they are without merit. He trusts that they will now cease immediately."

The following day, Saint-Étienne announced they and Malbranque had agreed to a mutual termination of his contract.

There was another circulated that Malbranque would consider retirement, something that denied by Malbranque himself.

=== Return to Lyon ===
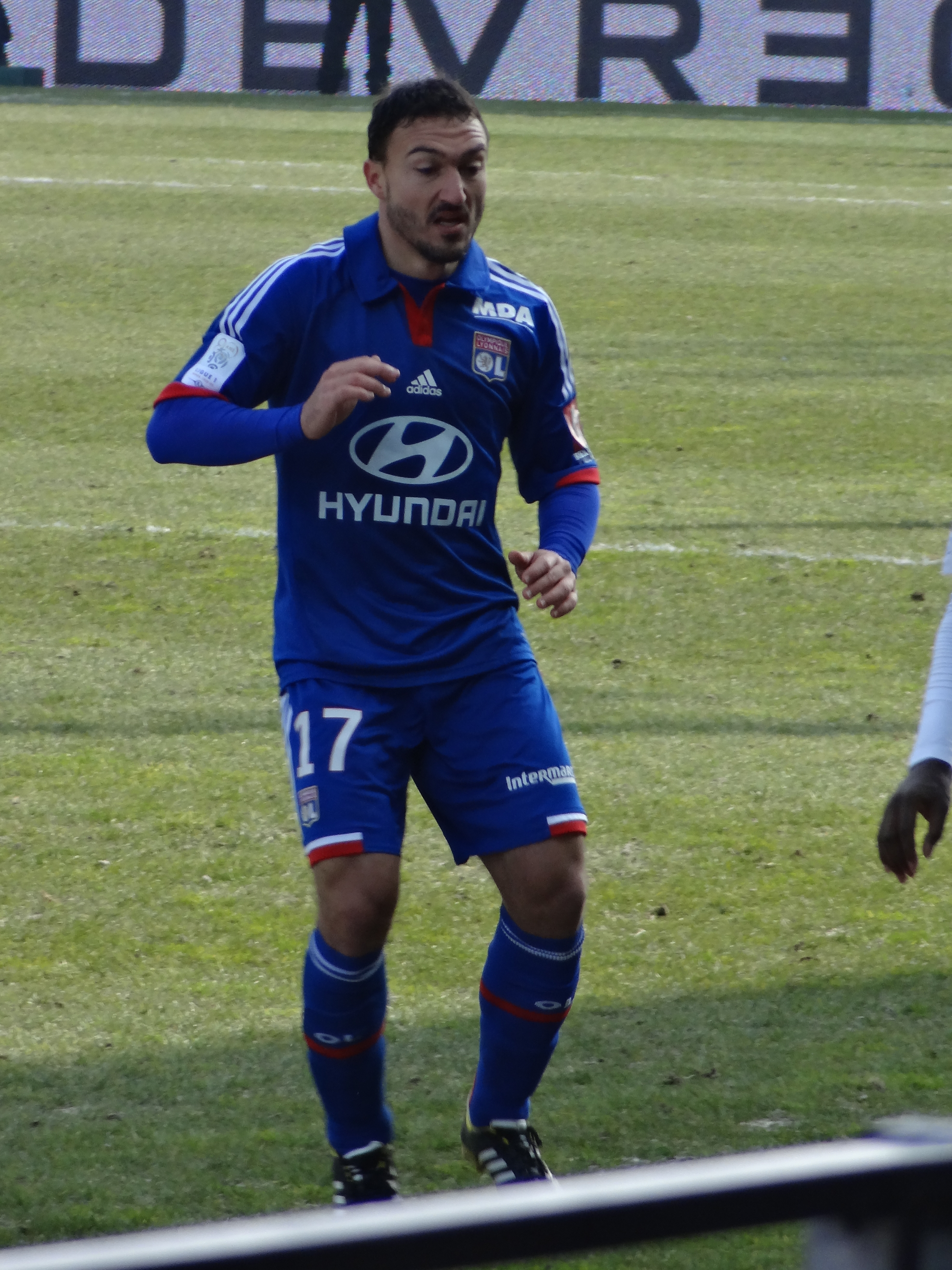
Malbranque playing for Lyon in 2013

On 2 August 2012, it was confirmed by Malbranque's first club Lyon that he was being taken on trial with the view to a permanent contract. On 25 August 2012 Malbranque signed a one-year contract with Lyon after spending three weeks with the club.

In his first game after returning to Lyon, Malbranque played a superb game against Valenciennes being paired with Maxime Gonalons in midfield and helped his team win the game 3–2. He played the next game for Lyon on 16 September, against Ajaccio and in 75th minute of the match he delivered an assist to Lisandro to make the final result 2–0 for Lyon. In a UEFA Europa League tie against Hapoel Kiryat Shmona on 4 October, Malbranque delivered another key assist, this time from a corner in the 93rd minute for Gueïda Fofana to head the ball into the net and make the final result 4–3 for Lyon. On 21 October Lyon played against Brest and it was again Malbranque with a wonderful chip assist in the 57th minute for Gomis to make the final result 1–0 for Lyon. On 4 November, Lyon encountered Bastia at Gerland and Malbranque assisted for Briand and two minutes later scored a penalty himself in the 95th minute to make the final score 5–2 for Lyon. On 11 November, he assisted from a free kick for Gonalons in Sochaux, but Sochaux equalised through Sloan Privat in the 71st minute and the match ended 1–1. A week later Lyon played against Reims and won 3–0 with Malbranque assisting Lisandro for the third goal in the 90th minute. On 28 November, with Lyon visiting Marseille, Malbranque scored a volley from Lacazette's cross making it 3–0 for Lyon. The game eventually ended with Lyon winning 4–1, with Gomis adding Lyon's fourth goal. He made his sixth Ligue 1 assist of the season for Michel Bastos' equaliser against Nancy on 12 December 2012, with the game ending 1–1. During the same month, Malbranque would sign a new contract with the club, which will keep him until 2014.

In their first league game of 2013, Lyon played away against ESTAC Troyes on 12 January winning the match 2–1, with Malbranque assisting from the corner for Gonalons' opener in 11th minute.

=== Caen ===
On 17 June 2016, Malbranque signed for Caen as a free agent on a one-year contract.

=== Amateur leagues ===
In November 2017, he came out of retirement to sign with Chasselay MDA, playing in the Championnat National 2. On 4 September 2020, he joined Limonest in the Championnat National 3.

== International career ==
Born in Belgium to French parents, Malbranque was called up to the French Under-21s and was part of the squad of Les Bleus that lost to the Czech Republic in the final of the 2002 UEFA European Under-21 Football Championship.

In February 2004, after failing to break into France's senior squad, Malbranque expressed an interest in representing the Belgium national team. However, the Red Devils' coach Aimé Anthuenis claimed that Malbranque was not eligible to represent the country. A month later, Malbranque was called into the senior France squad for a friendly against the Netherlands but was an unused squad member.

In November 2012, Malbranque received a call-up to the French squad for a friendly against Italy but again failed to earn his debut cap.

== Career statistics ==
Appearances and goals by club, season and competition
Club	Season	League			National cup (Note: Includes Coupe de France, FA Cup)		League cup (Note: Includes Coupe de la Ligue, Football League Cup)		Europe		Total	
Club	Season	Division	Apps	Goals	Apps	Goals	Apps	Goals	Apps	Goals	Apps	Goals
Lyon	1997–98	French Division 1	2	0	0	0	0	0	0	0	2	0
Lyon	1998–99	French Division 1	21	0	1	0	1	0	4 (Note: Appearances in UEFA Cup)	0	27	0
Lyon	1999–2000	French Division 1	28	3	4	1	2	0	6	0	40	4
Lyon	2000–01	French Division 1	26	2	3	0	2	2	10 (Note: Appearances in UEFA Champions League)	2	41	6
Lyon	Total		77	5	8	1	5	2	20	2	110	10
Fulham	2001–02	Premier League	37	8	6	1	3	1	–		46	10
Fulham	2002–03	Premier League	37	6	4	4	0	0	14	3	55	13
Fulham	2003–04	Premier League	38	6	6	2	0	0	–		44	8
Fulham	2004–05	Premier League	26	6	1	0	4	1	–		31	7
Fulham	2005–06	Premier League	34	6	0	0	1	0	–		35	6
Tottenham Hotspur	2006–07	Premier League	25	2	6	1	4	0	6	2	41	5
Tottenham Hotspur	2007–08	Premier League	37	4	3	0	5	2	10	1	55	7
Tottenham Hotspur	Total		62	6	9	1	9	2	16	3	96	12
Sunderland	2008–09	Premier League	36	1	2	0	2	0	–		40	1
Sunderland	2009–10	Premier League	31	0	1	1	3	0	–		35	1
Sunderland	2010–11	Premier League	35	0	1	0	1	0	–		37	0
Sunderland	Total		102	1	4	1	6	0	–		112	2
AS Saint-Étienne	2011–12	Ligue 1	1	0	0	0	0	0	–		1	0
Lyon	2012–13	Ligue 1	31	2	0	0	1	0	6 (Note: Appearances in UEFA Europa League)	0	38	2
Lyon	2013–14	Ligue 1	23	1	3	2	3	0	12	0	41	3
Lyon	2014–15	Ligue 1	28	3	2	0	1	0	4	1	35	4
Lyon	2015–16	Ligue 1	11	0	1	0	1	0	2	0	15	0
Lyon	Total		93	6	6	2	6	0	24	1	129	9
Caen	2016–17	Ligue 1	13	0	1	0	1	0	–		15	0
Caen II	2016–17	Championnat National 3	2	1	–		–		–		2	1
Chasselay MDA	2017–18	Championnat National 2	12	1	0	0	–		–		12	1
Chasselay MDA	2018–19	Championnat National 2	8	0	0	0	–		–		8	0
Chasselay MDA	2019–20	Championnat National 2	0	0	0	0	–		–		0	0
Chasselay MDA	Total		20	1	0	0	–		–		20	1
Limonest	2020–21	Championnat National 3	2	0	1	0	–		–		3	0
Career total			544	52	46	12	35	6	74	9	699	79

== Honours ==
Lyon

- Coupe de la Ligue: 2000–01

Fulham

- UEFA Intertoto Cup: 2002

Tottenham Hotspur

- Football League Cup: 2007–08
