= Blaise Tohou =

Chadian footballer (born 1997)

Personal information
- Full name: Blaise Tohou Ngague
- Date of birth: 17 February 1997 (age 29)
- Place of birth: Kyabé, Chad
- Height: 1.76 m (5 ft 9 in)
- Position: Attacking midfielder

Youth career
- 2006–2012: Stade Amplepuisien
- 2012–2016: Lyon

College career
Years	Team	Apps	(Gls)
2017–2020	UConn Huskies	51	(2)

Senior career*
Years	Team	Apps	(Gls)
2015–2016	Lyon B	3	(0)
2020–2022	FC Lyon		
2022	Lyon La Duchère II	1	(0)
2023	Besa Biel	6	(0)

International career^{‡}
2020–	Chad	1	(0)
- * Club domestic league appearances and goals as of 20:05, 14 November 2023 (UTC) ‡ National team caps and goals as of 21:23, 13 April 2021 (UTC)

Blaise Tohou (born 17 February 1997) is a Chadian footballer who plays for the Chad national team.

== Early career ==
In 2006 Tohou joined Stade Amplepuisien. He remained at the club until 2012 when he joined the academy of Olympique Lyonnais of Ligue 1. He stayed with the club for four seasons before leaving due to injury. During his final two seasons at Lyonnais he worked his way into the second team and made three league appearances in the Championnat National 2. After departing from Olympique Lyonnais, Tohou joined FC Lyon from 2016 to 2017.

== College career ==
Tohou played college soccer in the United States for the UConn Huskies from 2017 to 2019. In total he made 51 appearances for the team, scoring two goals.

== International career ==
Tohou was first invited to the Chad squad in August 2015 for 2016 African Nations Championship qualification. He eventually made his senior international debut on 10 October 2020 in a friendly loss to Niger.

== Career statistics ==
=== International ===
As of match played 10 October 2020

National team	Year	Apps	Goals
Chad	2020	1	0
Chad	2021	0	0
Total		1	0
