= Genest =

Genest is a surname. Notable people with the surname include:

- Charles-Borromée Genest (1832–1873), Canadian politician
- Christian Genest (born 1957), Canadian statistician
- Claude Genest, Canadian journalist, actor, and television host
- Corinna Genest (1938–2023), German film and television actress
- Émile Genest (1921–2003), Canadian actor
- Jacques Genest (1919–2018), Canadian physician and scientist
- John Genest (1764–1839), English clergyman and theatre historian
- Lauriane Genest (born 1998), Canadian racing cyclist
- Manon Genest (born 1992), French Paralympic athlete and former paratriathlete
- Rick Genest (August 7, 1985 – August 1, 2018), also known as "Zombie Boy", Canadian tattooee, model, and actor
- Andre Genest, CPA (born July 29, 1992), Wealth Advisor, Professional Accountant, and actor

== See also ==
- Le Genest-Saint-Isle, Mayenne department, France
- Genet (surname)
