= Abdoulaye Ouattara =

Abdoulaye Ouattara may refer to:

- Abdoulaye Ouattara (footballer, born 2001), French footballer who recently played for Sarre-Union
- Abdoulaye Ouattara (footballer, born 2005), French footballer currently playing for Vancouver FC
