= Olympique Lyonnais Reserves and Academy =

Reserve team and academy of French football club Olympique Lyonnais

Olympique Lyonnais
- Full name: Olympique Lyonnais
- Nicknames: Les Gones, Lyon, or OL
- Founded: 1899/1950
- Ground: Stade Gérard Houllier, Décines-Charpieu
- Capacity: 1,524
- Chairman: (United States) John Textor
- Manager: (France) Gueida Fofana (National 3) (France) Samy Saci (U-19s) (France) Amaury Barlet (U-17s)
- League: Championnat National 3 Championnat National Under-19; Championnat National Under-17
- 2022–23 (National 2): National 2 Group C, 14th (relegated)
| Home colours | Away colours | Third colours |

The Olympique Lyonnais Reserves & Academy are the reserve team and academy of French club Olympique Lyonnais. The reserves squad play in the Championnat National 3, the fifth division of French football and the second highest division the team is allowed to participate in. Lyon have won the reserves title of the Championnat de France Amateur six times. They have won in 1998, 2001, 2003, 2006, and 2009, and 2010.

== Overview ==
The U-19 squad participates in their weekly league, the Championnat National U19, which is a league comprising four groups of fourteen clubs who play each other twice during the regular season. This session is dubbed Phase 1. Following the regular season, the four group winners are randomly selected to face each other in semi-final matches (dubbed Phase 2) to decide who will play each other in the Under-18 Championnat National championship match, usually held in Mayenne. There is also a third-place match, which is usually held just before the championship match. The Under-18 squad also regularly participates in the Coupe Gambardella. They have won the title on 4 occasions. They won the cup in 1971, 1994, 1997 and 2022.

The U-17 side participates in a league, the Championnat National U17, a youth league comprising six groups of twelve clubs who play each other twice during the regular season, dubbed Phase 1. Following the regular season, the six group winners and the two best second place clubs are randomly inserting into two groups of four, where they play each other at neutral venues once over a span of four days. This portion is dubbed Phase 2. The two winners of each group will then face each other in the championship match to determine the champion of the Under-17 Championnat National. The Under-17 squad also participates in regional cup competitions.

The current National 3 manager is Gueida Fofana, who played for Olympique Lyonnais before but had his career cut-short due to injuries. He has been the manager of Lyon's reserves team since 2019. The manager of the Olympique Lyonnais U-19s and U-17s are Samy Saci and Amaury Barlet.

== Philosophy ==
According to Faouzi Djedou-Benabid, the scout for Niort and the co-author of Pourquoi le foot français va dans le mur (lit. 'Why French football goes into wall'; 2015), published by Hugo Sport, the training provided in Olympique Lyonnais academy favors the technical learning of football over match results, like FC Barcelona: thus, "Lyon educators do not hesitate to have defenders play in midfield so that 'they can learn to use their feet better". In addition, the formation does not favor any pattern of play, allowing the players to adapt easily to all positions during the game.

As a result of this philosophy, since the 2010s, Lyon youth academy gained reputation all around Europe as being one of the top football academies in the continent, producing several players playing in European top tier competitions. Between 2012 and 2019, Lyon appears successively eight times in top 4 of the International Centre for Sports Studies list of the best football academies in Europe. Lyon was also rated by the French Football Federation as the best football academy in France for six seasons in a row, between 2013 and 2019.

In February 2014, L'Équipe writes that Olympique Lyonnais ranks second in terms of the number of players trained at the club and playing in the "five major European championships" (Germany, England, Spain, France and Italy) tied with Real Madrid, and the first being FC Barcelona. In 2015, France Football rated Lyon youth academy as one of the best in Europe, as it is used to feed the first team, and also having a pool of players with value on the transfer market, without this being in the heart of the club's policy. Indeed, the competition level in Lyon's youth team is very difficult for young players, they will regularly, voluntarily or not, emancipate themselves in other very young clubs. Just as regularly, a certain number of them manage to have a good national or international career such as Ludovic Giuly, Karim Benzema, Alexandre Lacazette, Samuel Umtiti, or Nabil Fekir.

== Honours ==
- Championnat de France Amateurs: 7
  - Champions: 1998, 2001, 2003, 2006, 2009, 2010, 2011
- Championnat National U17: 4
  - Champions: 1994, 2000, 2004, 2014
- Championnat National U19: 3
  - Champions: 1993, 2000, 2005
- Coupe Gambardella: 4
  - Champions: 1971, 1994, 1997, 2022
  - Finalists: 1970, 1992, 2005, 2006, 2015
- Coupe Nationale U16 (with Rhône-Alpes): 2
  - Champions: 1960, 1996
- French Division 3: 1
  - Champions: 1993
- Montaigu Tournament: 2
  - Champions: 2000, 2004
- Premier League International Cup
  - Finalists: 2024–25

== Current squad ==
=== Reserve squad (Olympique Lyonnais II) ===
As of 14 July 2026

Note: Flags indicate national team as defined under FIFA eligibility rules; some limited exceptions apply. Players may hold more than one non-FIFA nationality.

| No. | Pos. | Nation | Player |
|---|---|---|---|
| — | GK | FRA | Axel Barreau |
| — | GK | POR | Matthias Da Silva |
| — | GK | CIV | Yvann Konan |
| — | DF | FRA | Yacine Chaïb |
| — | DF | FRA | Boubakar Diarra |
| — | DF | FRA | Angel Garcia |
| — | DF | FRA | Melvyn Otobo |
| — | DF | FRA | Jibril Rejeb |
| — | MF | SEN | Pierre Dorival |
| — | MF | SEN | Fallou Fall |
| — | MF | POR | Tiago Gonçalves |

| No. | Pos. | Nation | Player |
|---|---|---|---|
| — | MF | SUI | Joss Marques |
| — | MF | COD | Billy-Paul Mavudia |
| — | MF | TUR | Haktan Şener |
| — | MF | COD | Cluver Sambi Mbungu |
| — | FW | ALG | Daryll Benlahlou |
| — | FW | FRA | Nathanaël Beta |
| — | FW | SEN | Ibrahima Fall |
| — | FW | FRA | Adil Hamdani |
| — | FW | ALG | Yannis Lagha |
| — | FW | FRA | Nehemie Lurika |

=== U19 squad ===
Note: Flags indicate national team as defined under FIFA eligibility rules; some limited exceptions apply. Players may hold more than one non-FIFA nationality.

| No. | Pos. | Nation | Player |
|---|---|---|---|
| — | GK | FRA | Zaki Atamna |
| — | GK | FRA | Mathis Iwosso |
| — | DF | MAR | Adam Alioui |
| — | DF | FRA | Sawann Chaulet |
| — | DF | FRA | Angel García |
| — | DF | FRA | Kassim Mnandji |
| — | DF | FRA | Kylian Negri |
| — | DF | FRA | Emmanuel Pampi |
| — | DF | FRA | Nolan Velut |

| No. | Pos. | Nation | Player |
|---|---|---|---|
| — | MF | FRA | Noah Duclieu |
| — | MF | ALG | Walid Nechab |
| — | MF | TUR | Haktan Sener |
| — | FW | FRA | Hocine Boulegroun |
| — | FW | FRA | Téo Germinario |
| — | FW | FRA | Gnadou Gohi |
| — | FW | FRA | Mathieu Hoareau |
| — | FW | TUR | Ottman Katirag |
| — | FW | FRA | Issiaga Soumah |

=== U17 squad ===
Note: Flags indicate national team as defined under FIFA eligibility rules; some limited exceptions apply. Players may hold more than one non-FIFA nationality.

| No. | Pos. | Nation | Player |
|---|---|---|---|
| — | GK | FRA | Ethan Leveneur |
| — | GK | FRA | Joël Mbala |
| — | DF | COM | Nizard Ahmed Moussa |
| — | DF | FRA | Tiago Asse-Bille |
| — | DF | FRA | Yanis Bah Girondins |
| — | DF | FRA | Rubio Berliat |
| — | DF | FRA | Jérémie Mputu |
| — | DF | FRA | Félix Onana |
| — | DF | FRA | Aaron Trincat |
| — | MF | FRA | Naïm Adjimi |
| — | MF | ITA | Lylian Di Nota |
| — | MF | FRA | Rayhan Hajjari |
| — | MF | FRA | Emany Mayulu |

| No. | Pos. | Nation | Player |
|---|---|---|---|
| — | MF | COD | Jason Nkelenda |
| — | MF | CAF | Edwin Penka |
| — | MF | FRA | Théo Petan Ranguin |
| — | FW | FRA | Hedi Chekhab |
| — | FW | BEL | Ousmane Fofana |
| — | FW | FRA | Ilan Khadraoui |
| — | FW | FRA | Amine Lazak |
| — | FW | FRA | Khalil Mahici |
| — | FW | FRA | Mohamed Meguenni |
| — | FW | FRA | Djibril Merouani |
| — | FW | FRA | Ajdin Muminović |
| — | FW | FRA | Farès Tracol |
| — | FW | FRA | Bojan Zeković |

== Staff ==
As of 1 July 2025

| Position | Name |
|---|---|
| General Director | (France) Fabien Caballero |
| Reserves Manager | (France) Gueïda Fofana |
| Reserves Assistant Manager | (France) Pierre Chavondrier |
| Academy Goalkeeper Coach | (France) Olivier Blondel (France) Sébastien Gerin |
| Academy Fitness Coach | (France) Nicolas Quinault |
| U-19 Manager | (France) Florent Balmont |
| U-19 Assistant Manager | (France) Rémy Kaleche |
| U-19 Fitness Coach | (France) Antoine Maennel |
| U-19 Athletic Coach | (France) Florian Testard |
| U-17 Manager | (France) Samy Saci |
| U-17 Assistant Managers | (France) Mour Paye |
| U-17 Fitness Coach | (France) Mattéo Cathalot |
| Preformation Director | (France) Nicolas Brun |
| Sporting Coordinator | (France) Guy Genet |

== Notable alumni ==
Many players from Lyon's youth system have managed to reach the professional level in football, whether at Lyon or at other clubs. As of October 2026, 38 players formed in the Lyon academy had capped for the France national football team. Below is a non-exhaustive list of notable players who trained in the youth or reserve teams of Olympique Lyonnais:

**France**

- (France) Loïc Abenzoar
- (France) Ghislain Anselmini
- (France) Leeroy Anton
- (France) **Marcel Aubour**
- (France) Jérémy Aymes
- (France) Kamal Bafounta
- (France) Farès Bahlouli
- (France) Mohamed Bahlouli
- (France) Florent Balmont
- (France) **Bradley Barcola**
- (France) Melvin Bard
- (France) Cédric Bardon
- (France) Xavier Barrau
- (France) Christian Bassila
- (France) Karim Belhocine
- (France) Olivier Bellisi
- (France) Nicolas Belvito
- (France) **Hatem Ben Arfa**
- (France) Mourad Benhamida
- (France) Farid Benstiti
- (France) **Karim Benzema**
- (France) Bryan Bergougnoux
- (Guadeloupe) Olivier Bernard
- (France) Jérémy Berthod
- (France) Grégory Bettiol
- (France) Romain Beynié
- (France) Maxime Blanc
- (France) Noam Bonnet
- (French Guiana) Kayne Bonnevie
- (France) Gilbert Bonvin
- (France) Pierre Bouby
- (France) **Jérémie Bréchet**
- (France) Anthony Briançon
- (France) Maxence Caqueret
- (France) Alexis Carra
- (France) Maxime Cassara
- (France) Alain Caveglia
- (France) Johann Charpenet
- (France) Mickael Charvet
- (France) **Yves Chauveau**
- (France) Xavier Chavalerin
- (France) **Rayan Cherki**
- (France) **François Clerc**
- (France) Jérémy Clément
- (France) Timothé Cognat
- (France) Renaud Cohade
- (France) Mickaël Colloredo
- (France) **Néstor Combin**
- (France) Gilles Constantinian
- (France) Yoann Court
- (France) Laurent Courtois
- (France) Florent Da Silva
- (France) Andrea Damiani
- (France) Stéphane Darbion
- (France) Maxime D'Arpino
- (France) Fabien Debec
- (France) Laurent Debrosse
- (France) Romain Dedola
- (France) Romain Del Castillo
- (France) Sylvain Deplace
- (France) Jean-Christophe Devaux
- (France) **Fleury Di Nallo**
- (France) Yohan Di Tommaso
- (France) **Jean Djorkaeff**
- (France) **Raymond Domenech**
- (Collectivity of Saint Martin) Belony Dumas
- (France) **Jean-Philippe Durand**
- (France) Franck Durix
- (France) Alan Dzabana
- (France) Yann Ekra
- (France) Mohamed El Arouch
- (France) Stephen Ettien
- (France) Sébastien Faure
- (France) Julien Faussurier
- (France) **Nabil Fekir**
- (France) Yassin Fekir
- (France) Jordan Ferri
- (France) Fabrice Fiorèse
- (France) Maxence Flachez
- (France) Sébastien Flochon
- (France) **Laurent Fournier**
- (France) Pascal Fugier
- (France) **Rémi Garde**
- (France) Bruno Génésio
- (France) Alexis Genet
- (France) Guy Genet
- (France) Gaël Genevier
- (France) Willem Geubbels
- (France) **Ludovic Giuly**
- (France) Yohan Gomez
- (France) Anthony Gomez Mancini
- (France) **Maxime Gonalons**
- (France) Mathieu Gorgelin
- (France) Hérold Goulon
- (France) **Sidney Govou**
- (France) Fabrice Grange
- (France) **Clément Grenier**
- (France) Sébastien Grimaldi
- (France) **Malo Gusto**
- (France) Adil Hamdani
- (Martinique) Joan Hartock
- (France) Alexandre Hauw
- (France) David Hellebuyck
- (France) Rémi Himbert
- (France) Kévin Jacmot
- (France) Warren Jacmot
- (France) Joris Jehan
- (France) **Franck Jurietti**
- (France) Joseph Kalulu
- (France) **Pierre Kalulu**
- (France) Steeve Kango
- (France) Timothée Kolodziejczak
- (France) Billy Koumetio
- (France) Zakarie Labidi
- (France) **Alexandre Lacazette**
- (France) **Bernard Lacombe**
- (France) Guillaume Lacour
- (France) Stéphane Lalaoui
- (France) Gérard Lanthier
- (France) Florent Laville
- (France) William Le Pogam
- (France) Sekou Lega
- (France) **Esteban Lepaul**
- (France) David Linarès
- (France) Cyriaque Louvion
- (France) **Castello Lukeba**
- (France) Steed Malbranque
- (France) Jérémy Manzorro
- (France) Yoann Martelat
- (France) Alexis Martial
- (France) **Anthony Martial**
- (France) Boris Mathis
- (France) Florent Marty
- (France) **Florian Maurice**
- (France) Jonathan Mendes
- (France) Khalis Merah
- (France) Amine Messoussa
- (France) Julian Michel
- (France) Enzo Molebe
- (France) Anthony Mounier
- (France) Théo Ndicka
- (France) Louis Nganioni
- (France) **Bruno Ngotty**
- (Martinique) Camille Ninel
- (Martinique) Robert Nouzaret
- (Martinique) Harry Novillo
- (France) Florent Ogier
- (France) Abdoulaye Ouattara
- (France) Sandy Paillot
- (France) Julian Palmieri
- (France) Mathieu Patouillet
- (France) Mour Paye
- (France) Pascal Pédemonte
- (France) Florent Perradin

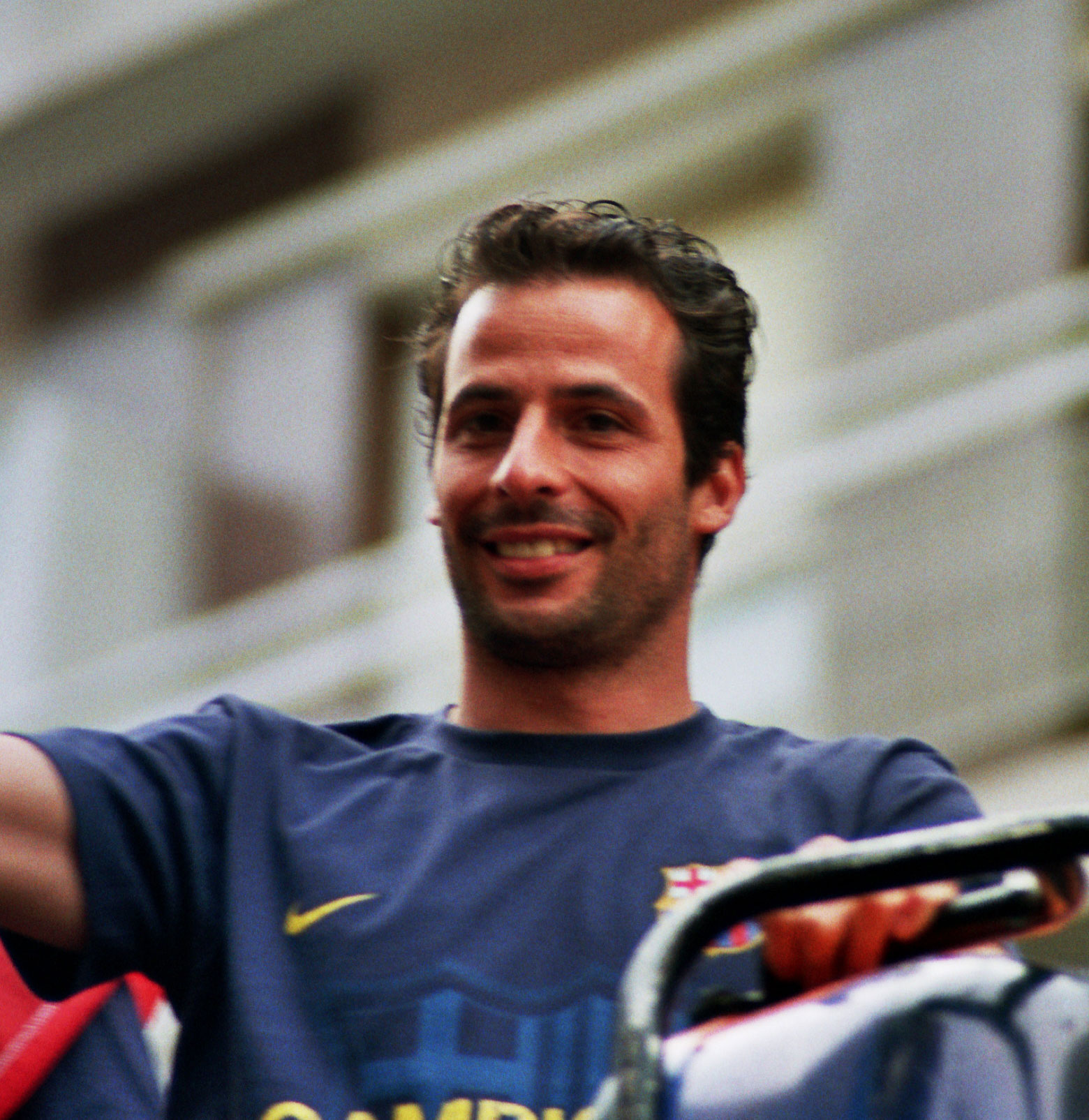
Ludovic Giuly, a former graduate of the Lyon youth academy. He was the assistant manager of Lyon's first team during the 2022-23 season.

- (France) Gaëtan Perrin
- (France) Jacques Philip
- (France) Jérémy Pied
- (France) Lenny Pintor
- (France) **Alassane Pléa**
- (France) Damien Plessis
- (France) Nicolas Priet
- (France) Grégoire Puel
- (France) Paulin Puel
- (France) Nicolas Puydebois
- (France) Nicolas Rabuel
- (France) **Daniel Ravier**
- (France) Enzo Reale
- (France) **Loïc Rémy**
- (France) Gwenaël Renaud
- (France) Remy Riou
- (France) Claude-Arnaud Rivenet
- (France) Thomas Robinet
- (France) Mickaël Rol
- (France) Mathieu Salamand

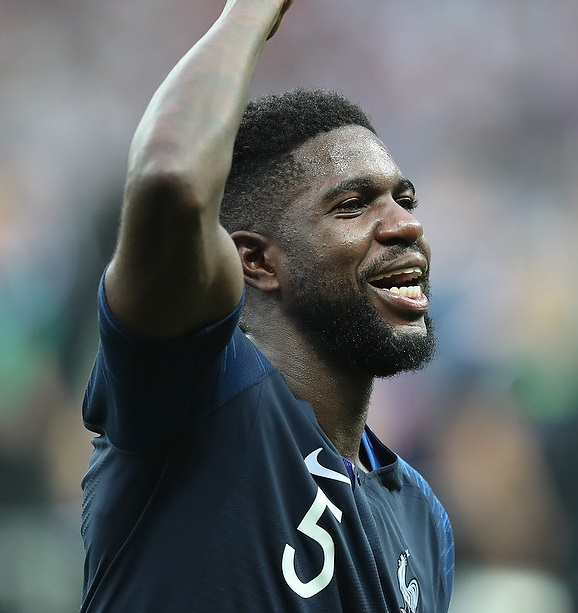
Samuel Umtiti graduated from Lyon youth academy in 2012. He started for France national football team in UEFA Euro 2016 Final and 2018 FIFA World Cup Final.

- (France) Romain Sartre
- (France) **Ernest Schultz**
- (France) Nicolas Seguin
- (France) Yoan Severin
- (France) Stéphane Solomenko
- (France) Yaya Soumaré
- (France) Julien Stephan
- (France) Éric Taborda
- (France) Kevin Tapoko
- (France) Hermann Tebily
- (France) Titouan Thomas
- (France) **Corentin Tolisso**
- (France) Johann Truchet
- (France) Marvin Tshibuabua
- (France) **Samuel Umtiti**
- (France) Cédric Uras
- (France) Pierrick Valdivia
- (France) Julien Viale
- (France) Roland Vieira
- (France) Hugo Vogel
- (France) **Daniel Xuereb**
- (France) Yoan Zouma

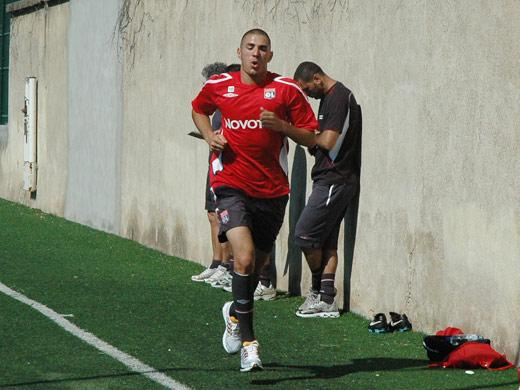
Karim Benzema played for Lyon from 1997 to 2005. He is one of the most successful graduates of the Lyon youth academy and the only person so far from the academy to win the Ballon d'Or.

**Africa**

- (Algeria) Oussama Amar
- (Algeria) **Houssem Aouar**
- (Algeria) **Ishak Belfodil**
- (Algeria) **Yassine Benzia**
- (Algeria) Yassine Ben Hamed
- (Algeria) **Abdelkader Ghezzal**
- (Algeria) **Rachid Ghezzal**
- (Algeria) **Amine Gouiri**
- (Algeria) **Yacine Hima**
- (Algeria) **Khaled Kharroubi**
- (Algeria) Yannis Lagha
- (Algeria) **Khaled Lemmouchia**
- (Algeria) **Karim Maroc**
- (Algeria) Saïd Mehamha
- (Algeria) Yannis Tafer
- (Algeria) Hussayn Touati
- (Algeria) **Mehdi Zeffane**
- (Algeria) Nassim Zitouni
- (Angola) **Jordy Gaspar**
- (Burkina Faso) Nassim Innocenti
- (Burkina Faso) **Vincent Ye**
- (Central African Republic) **Junior Sambia**
- (Chad) **Blaise Tohou**
- (Republic of the Congo) **Yann Mabella**
- (Ivory Coast) **Sinaly Diomandé**
- (Ivory Coast) Lossémy Karaboué
- (Ivory Coast) Éric Tié Bi

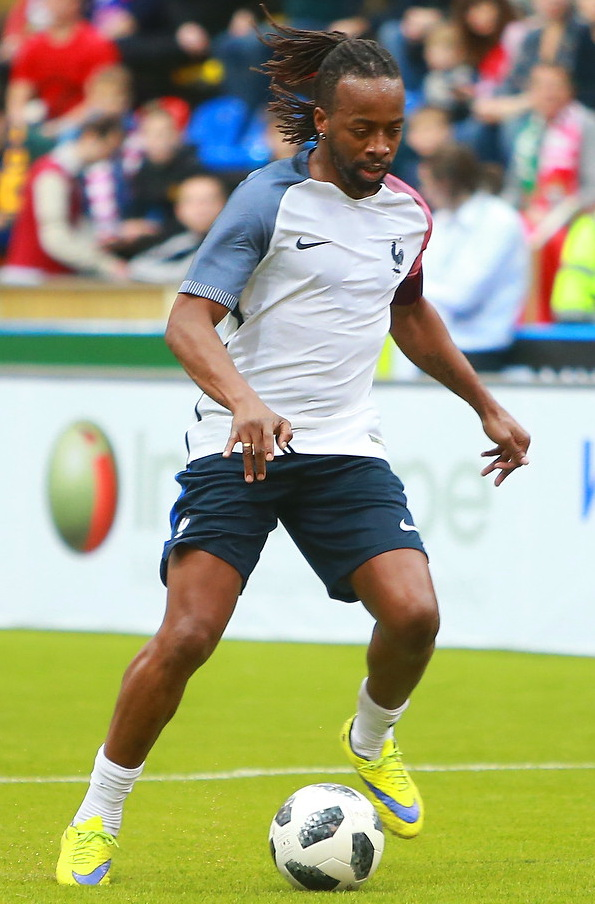
Sidney Govou joined Lyon youth academy in 1996 at the age of 17. He was promoted to the first team in 2000 and won the 2001 Young Player of the Year Award in his first season in Ligue 1. He is the only academy graduate to have taken part in all of the club's 7 successive league titles.

- (Cameroon) Raphaël Anaba
- (Cameroon) **Romarin Billong**
- (Cameroon) **Joseph-Désiré Job**
- (Cameroon) **Olivier Kemen**
- (Cameroon) Philippe N'Dioro
- (Cameroon) **Clinton N'Jie**
- (Comoros) **Nasser Chamed**
- (Comoros) **Moussa Djoumoi**
- (Comoros) **Myziane Maolida**
- (Comoros) **Faiz Mattoir**
- (Central African Republic) **Cyriaque Mayounga**
- (Central African Republic) **Dylan Mboumbouni**
- (Central African Republic) **Amos Youga**
- (Central African Republic) **Kelly Youga**
- (Democratic Republic of the Congo) **Aldo Kalulu**
- (Democratic Republic of the Congo) **Gédéon Kalulu**
- (Democratic Republic of the Congo) Yann Kitala
- (Democratic Republic of the Congo) **Samuel Moutoussamy**
- (Gabon) **Bryan Meyo**
- (Ghana) Emmanuel Danso
- (Ghana) **Elisha Owusu**
- (Guinea) **Mouctar Diakhaby**
- (Guinea) Sekou Yansané
- (Guinea) **Mohamed Yattara**
- (Guinea-Bissau) **Formose Mendy**
- (Madagascar) **Fabien Boyer**
- (Madagascar) **Thomas Fontaine**
- (Morocco) **Jamal Alioui**
- (Morocco) Achraf Laâziri
- (Morocco) Fahd Moufi
- (Morocco) Kays Ruiz-Atil
- (Mali) Issiar Dramé
- (Mali) **Frédéric Kanouté**
- (Mali) Habib Keïta
- (Mali) **Sidy Koné**
- (Rwanda) **Bryan Ngwabije**
- (Senegal) **Lamine Gassama**
- (Senegal) Pathé Mboup
- (Senegal) **Abdoulaye Ndiaye**
- (Senegal) **Bouna Sarr**
- (Senegal) **Mamadou Sarr**
- (Senegal) Mouhamadou-Naby Sarr
- (Senegal) **Demba Touré**
- (Chad) **Sylvain Idangar**
- (Togo) **Ludovic Assemoassa**
- (Togo) **Malcolm Barcola**
- (Tunisia) **Anice Badri**
- (Tunisia) **Chaïm El Djebali**
- (Tunisia) **Habib Oueslati**
- (Tunisia) **Hamza Rafia**

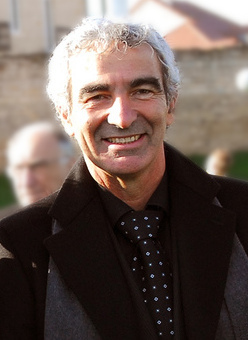
Raymond Domenech, former France national football team manager and former graduate of the Lyon youth academy.

**Europe**

- (Belgium) Théo Defourny
- (Belgium) Héritier Deyonge
- (Bosnia and Herzegovina) Muamer Aljic
- (Croatia) Teo Barišić
- (England) Alejandro Gomes Rodriguez
- (England) Reo Griffiths
- (Georgia (country)) **Aleksandre Guruli**
- (Georgia (country)) **Georges Mikautadze**
- (Italy) Francesco Migliore
- (Luxembourg) **Christopher Martins Pereira**
- (Norway) Ulrik Yttergård Jenssen
- (Norway) Tord Salte
- (Poland) Bartosz Talar
- (Portugal) Mathys De Carvalho
- (Portugal) Tiago Gonçalves
- (Portugal) **Anthony Lopes**
- (Switzerland) Jérémy Frick
- (Switzerland) Kilian Pagliuca
- (Switzerland) Anthony Racioppi
- (Turkey) **Cenk Özkaçar**

**Asia**

- (China) Jian Tao
- (China) Yu Junwei
- (China) **Zhang Xiuwei**
- (South Korea) Kim Shin
- (Lebanon) **Philippe Paoli**
- (Thailand) Erawan Garnier
- (United Arab Emirates) **Hamdan Al Kamali**

**America**

- (Brazil) Camilo
- (Canada) **Zachary Brault-Guillard**

Players in bold are those who capped for their National team.

=== Alumni in France national football team ===
The following table shows the current list of Olympique Lyonnais-trained players in the French national team as of 5 October 2026, along with their year of birth, number of caps, and the corresponding period. Players whose international careers are still in progress are shown in bold type.

Players from the French National team trained at Olympique Lyonnais
| Player | Birthyear | Period | Caps | Goals |
|---|---|---|---|---|
| Ernest Schultz | 1931 | 1961 | 1 | 1 |
| Fleury Di Nallo | 1943 | 1962-1971 | 10 | 8 |
| Jean Djorkaeff | 1939 | 1964-1972 | 48 | 3 |
| Néstor Combin | 1940 | 1964-1968 | 8 | 4 |
| Marcel Aubour | 1940 | 1964-1968 | 20 | 0 |
| Yves Chauveau | 1945 | 1969 | 1 | 0 |
| Daniel Ravier | 1948 | 1973 | 2 | 0 |
| Raymond Domenech | 1952 | 1973-1979 | 8 | 0 |
| Bernard Lacombe | 1952 | 1973-1984 | 38 | 12 |
| Daniel Xuereb | 1959 | 1981-1989 | 8 | 1 |
| Jean-Philippe Durand | 1960 | 1988-1992 | 26 | 0 |
| Rémi Garde | 1966 | 1990-1992 | 6 | 0 |
| Laurent Fournier | 1964 | 1992 | 3 | 0 |
| Bruno Ngotty | 1971 | 1994-1997 | 6 | 0 |
| Florian Maurice | 1974 | 1996-1999 | 6 | 1 |
| Ludovic Giuly | 1976 | 2000-2005 | 17 | 3 |
| Jérémie Bréchet | 1979 | 2001-2003 | 3 | 0 |
| Sidney Govou | 1979 | 2002-2010 | 49 | 10 |
| Franck Jurietti | 1975 | 2005 | 1 | 0 |
| François Clerc | 1983 | 2006-2008 | 13 | 0 |
| Karim Benzema | 1987 | 2007-2022 | 97 | 37 |
| Hatem Ben Arfa | 1987 | 2007-2015 | 15 | 2 |
| Loïc Rémy | 1987 | 2009-2014 | 30 | 7 |
| Maxime Gonalons | 1989 | 2011-2015 | 8 | 0 |
| Clément Grenier | 1991 | 2013-2014 | 5 | 0 |
| Alexandre Lacazette | 1991 | 2013-2017 | 16 | 3 |
| Nabil Fekir | 1993 | 2015-2020 | 25 | 2 |
| Anthony Martial | 1993 | 2015-2021 | 30 | 2 |
| Samuel Umtiti | 1993 | 2016-2019 | 31 | 4 |
| Corentin Tolisso | 1994 | 2017-2021 | 28 | 2 |
| Alassane Pléa | 1993 | 2018 | 1 | 0 |
| Houssem Aouar | 1998 | 2020 | 1 | 0 |
| **Malo Gusto** | 2003 | 2023-present | 16 | 0 |
| **Castello Lukeba** | 2002 | 2023-present | 1 | 0 |
| **Bradley Barcola** | 2002 | 2024-present | 32 | 6 |
| **Pierre Kalulu** | 2000 | 2025-present | 5 | 0 |
| **Rayan Cherki** | 2003 | 2025-present | 18 | 3 |
| **Esteban Lepaul** | 2000 | 2026-present | 3 | 0 |
| **Total** | | **1961-present** | **636** | **111** |
