= Grégory Bettiol =

French footballer (born 1986)

Personal information
- Date of birth: 30 March 1986 (age 40)
- Place of birth: Villefranche-sur-Saône, France
- Height: 1.80 m (5 ft 11 in)
- Position: Striker

Youth career
- 2005–2006: Lyon

Senior career*
Years	Team	Apps	(Gls)
2006–2007	Lyon	4	(0)
2007–2013	Troyes	92	(10)
2013–2015	Clermont	33	(5)

International career
2004–2006	France U18		
2006–2007	France U19		
2007	France U21		
- * Club domestic league appearances and goals

Grégory Bettiol (born 30 March 1986) is a French former professional footballer who played as a striker.

== Career ==
=== Lyon ===
Born in Villefranche-sur-Saône, Bettiol was trained in the youth sections and player development program of Lyon from the age of 14. He was known by the club's followers for his prowess in the ranks of the Lyon' junior amateur team, playing in the CFA 2. In April 2006, it was announced by Lyon' president Jean-Michel Aulas that he would sign a one-year professional contract with the club alongside fellow young hope and France U-18 international Mourad Benhamida.

He had scored 16 goals in 21 appearances at the attack for his side captained by Benhamida and helped them win the second division Amateur Championship to get promoted in the CFA.

Bettiol was considered part of the young generation of promising players formed by Lyon who were signed by the club (sometimes before being sold to other outfits) like Jérémy Berthod, Karim Benzema, Hatem Ben Arfa, Mourad Benhamida, Bryan Bergougnoux, and Jérémy Clément.

=== Troyes ===
Bettiol was sold to Troyes at a fee of €330,000. He made his debut for Troyes in their 1–0 win over Guingamp coming on as a substitute. Bettiol scored his first goal on 24 August 2007 in Troyes' 2–0 win over Bastia. (Note: Grégory Bettiol – French league stats at LFP – also available in French (archived))

=== Clermont ===
On 30 January 2013, he signed a two and a half contract with Ligue 2 club Clermont.

== Honours ==
- Champion de France des réserves: 2006
- Coupe Gambardella finalist: 2005
- Champion de France 18 ans: 2005
- Trophée des Champions: 2006
