= Gwenaël Renaud =

French footballer (born 1983)

Personal information
- Date of birth: 4 October 1983 (age 43)
- Place of birth: Vénissieux, France
- Height: 1.68 m (5 ft 6 in)
- Position: Defender

Youth career
- –1997: US Saint-Gaudens
- 1997–2001: Lyon

Senior career*
Years	Team	Apps	(Gls)
2001–2003	Lyon B		
2003–2004	Valence	18	(0)
2004–2012	Balma	164+ (Note: Statistics from the 2004–05 to the 2007–08 season are incomplete.)	(2+)
2012–2014	Saint-Alban Aucamville	37	(0)
- * Club domestic league appearances and goals

Gwenaël Renaud (born 4 October 1983) is a French former professional footballer who played as a defender. He played at the professional level in Ligue 2 for Valence.

== Career ==
Born in Vénissieux, Renaud grew up in Payssous in the department of Haute-Garonne. In 1997, he left local club US Saint-Gaudens to join Lyon's youth academy. Renaud went on to sign a professional contract with Valence in 2003, playing in Ligue 2, before joining fourth-tier Balma in 2004. He joined Saint-Alban Aucamville in 2012, where he would finish his career in 2014.

== Personal life ==
Gwenaël's father Jacques was at a time the president of US Saint-Gaudens, where Gwenaël played in his youth. In 2020, at the age of 70, Jacques was elected mayor of Payssous until 2026.
