= Raphaël Anaba =

Cameroonian footballer

Personal information
- Full name: Raphael Ulrich Anaba Mbida Nga
- Date of birth: 8 March 2000 (age 26)
- Place of birth: Yaoundé, Cameroon
- Height: 1.76 m (5 ft 9 in)
- Position: Left-back

Team information
- Current team: Châteaubriant
- Number: 25

Youth career
- –2018: Les Brasseries du Cameroun
- 2018–2019: Lyon

Senior career*
Years	Team	Apps	(Gls)
2019−2021	Lyon II	22	(1)
2022	Senica	8	(0)
2023–2024	Niort	22	(0)
2023–2024	Niort II	7	(1)
2024–	Châteaubriant	18	(1)
- * Club domestic league appearances and goals as of 4 December 2025

Raphaël Anaba (born 8 March 2000) is a Cameroonian professional footballer who plays as a left-back for French Championnat National 1 club Châteaubriant.

== Career ==
Anaba made his professional Fortuna Liga debut for Senica in a match against Slovan Bratislava on 12 February 2022.
