= Héritier Deyonge =

Belgian footballer

Personal information
- Full name: Héritier Bora Deyonge
- Date of birth: 9 January 2002 (age 24)
- Place of birth: Ottignies-Louvain-la-Neuve, Belgium
- Height: 1.83 m (6 ft 0 in)
- Position: Defender

Youth career
- PSV

Senior career*
Years	Team	Apps	(Gls)
2019–2022	Lyon B	1	(0)
2020–2021	→ Jong Utrecht (loan)	8	(0)
2022–2023	Heracles Almelo	3	(0)
- * Club domestic league appearances and goals as of 19 May 2023

Héritier Bora Deyonge (born 9 January 2002) is a Belgian professional footballer who plays as a defender.

== Career ==
In 2019, Deyonge signed for Olympique Lyonnais.

In 2020, he was sent on loan to Jong FC Utrecht in the Eerste Divisie, the second tier of Dutch football.

On 27 July 2022, Deyonge returned to Eerste Divisie and signed a one-year contract with Heracles Almelo.
