= Alexis Genet =

French footballer (born 1982)

Personal information
- Date of birth: 9 June 1982 (age 44)
- Place of birth: Nîmes, France
- Height: 1.83 m (6 ft 0 in)
- Positions: Midfielder; defender

Youth career
- Lyon

Senior career*
| Years | Team | Apps | (Gls) |
| 1998–2006 | Lyon B | | |
| 2003–2004 | → Le Havre (loan) | 26 | (0) |
| 2004–2005 | → Bayonne (loan) | 29 | (0) |
| 2006–2007 | FC Saarbrücken | | |
| 2007–2009 | Sportfreunde Siegen | | |
| 2009–2010 | Saint-Priest | | |
| 2010–2015 | Monts d'Or Azergues | 83 | (2) |
| 2015–2016 | Limonest | | |
- * Club domestic league appearances and goals

Alexis Genet (born 9 June 1982) is a French former professional footballer who played as a midfielder and defender. A product of Lyon's youth academy, he played for Le Havre, Bayonne, FC Saarbrücken, Sportfreunde Siegen, Saint-Priest, Monts d'Or Azergues, and Limonest in his senior career.

== Personal life ==
Alexis's father Guy is also a former footballer.

== Honours ==
Lyon B

- Championnat de France Amateur: 2002–03
