= Romain Chouleur =

French professional footballer (born 1986)

Personal information
- Date of birth: 10 January 1986 (age 40)
- Place of birth: Nancy, France
- Height: 1.78 m (5 ft 10 in)
- Position: Midfielder

Team information
- Current team: Thaon

Senior career*
Years	Team	Apps	(Gls)
2003–2008	Nancy	3	(0)
2008–2011	Raon-l'Étape	101	(29)
2011–2016	Épinal	137	(49)
2016–	Thaon	0	(0)
- * Club domestic league appearances and goals as of 15:22, 19 June 2016 (UTC)

Romain Chouleur (born 10 January 1986) is a French professional footballer who currently plays as a midfielder for ES Thaon.

He played on the professional level in Ligue 1 for AS Nancy, and has also represented US Raon-l'Étape and SAS Épinal.

== Career statistics ==
As of 18 May 2016.

Club	Division	Season	League		Cup		League Cup		Total	
Club	Division	Season	Apps	Goals	Apps	Goals	Apps	Goals	Apps	Goals
Nancy	Ligue 1	2005–06	3	0	1	0	0	0	4	0
Raon-l'Étape	CFA Group B	2007–08	7	4	0	0	0	0	7	4
Raon-l'Étape	CFA Group A	2008–09	32	10	1	0	0	0	33	10
Raon-l'Étape	CFA Group A	2009–10	35	10	2	1	0	0	37	11
Raon-l'Étape	CFA Group B	2010–11	27	5	6	3	0	0	33	8
Épinal	National	2011–12	32	8	0	0	0	0	32	8
Épinal	National	2012–13	29	10	7	3	0	0	36	13
Épinal	CFA Group B	2013–14	30	19	5	4	0	0	35	23
Épinal	National	2014–15	30	8	5	0	0	0	35	8
Épinal	National	2015–16	16	4	0	0	0	0	16	4
Career totals			241	78	27	11	0	0	268	89
