= William Le Pogam =

French footballer (born 1993)

Personal information
- Date of birth: 3 March 1993 (age 33)
- Place of birth: Hyères, France
- Height: 1.83 m (6 ft 0 in)
- Position: Left-back

Team information
- Current team: Rapperswil-Jona
- Number: 37

Youth career
- –2011: Lyon

Senior career*
Years	Team	Apps	(Gls)
2011–2013	Lyon B	48	(1)
2013–2014	Guingamp B	23	(1)
2014–2015	Rayo Vallecano B	17	(0)
2015–2016	Toledo	26	(0)
2016–2018	Servette	37	(2)
2018–2019	Neuchâtel Xamax	3	(0)
2019–2020	Stade Lausanne-Ouchy	18	(0)
2020–2026	Yverdon	147	(7)
2026–	Rapperswil-Jona	9	(0)

International career
2009–2010	France U17	9	(0)
2010	France U18	4	(0)
2012	France U19	2	(1)
2012–2013	France U20	3	(0)
- * Club domestic league appearances and goals as of 18 September 2026

William Le Pogam (born 3 March 1993) is a French professional footballer who plays as a left-back for Swiss Challenge League club Rapperswil-Jona.

== Career ==
On 21 August 2019, Le Pogam joined Swiss Challenge League club FC Stade Lausanne Ouchy on a contract until 30 June 2020.

Le Pogam signed with Yverdon in 2020.
