= Mour Paye =

French footballer (born 1994)

Personal information
- Full name: Mour Paye
- Date of birth: 25 May 1994 (age 32)
- Place of birth: Lyon, France
- Height: 1.74 m (5 ft 9 in)
- Position: Forward

Team information
- Current team: Hauts Lyonnais

Youth career
- Lyon

Senior career*
Years	Team	Apps	(Gls)
2012–2016	Lyon B	73	(27)
2016–2017	Troyes B	13	(5)
2016–2017	Troyes	8	(0)
2017–2018	Créteil	18	(5)
2019	Villefranche	8	(0)
2019–2020	Saint-Priest	6	(1)
2020–2021	Bastia-Borgo	13	(0)
2021–	Hauts Lyonnais	7	(3)
- * Club domestic league appearances and goals as of 01:17, 3 December 2021 (UTC)

Mour Paye (born 25 May 1994) is a French professional footballer who plays as a forward for Championnat National 3 club Hauts Lyonnais.

== Career ==
Paye was a product of the training centre of Lyon, where he signed his first professional contract in 2014. In June 2016 he signed a two-year contract with Ligue 2 side Troyes. He made his professional debut for Troyes as a second half substitute in a 2–1 Ligue 2 defeat at Ajaccio on 5 August 2016. He left the club at the conclusion of his first season, having played 10 games in all competitions, and signed for Championnat National side Créteil.

Paye left Créteil when the 2017–18 season ended in relegation. He did not immediately sign for another club, but spent three months training with Villefranche, who eventually signed him in February 2019.

On 2 December 2019 Championnat National 2 club Saint-Priest confirmed, that Paye had joined the club, having been a free agent since leaving Villefranche at the end of the 2018–19 season.

In July 2020, Paye signed a one-year amateur contract with Championnat National side Bastia-Borgo. In 2021, he signed for Championnat National 3 side Hauts Lyonnais.
