= Guy Genet =

French footballer (born 1955)

Personal information
- Date of birth: 14 August 1955 (age 71)
- Place of birth: Lyon, France
- Height: 1.84 m (6 ft 0 in)
- Position: Defender

Team information
- Current team: Lyon (sports coordinator and kit man)

Youth career
- 1963–1971: Fontaines-sur-Sâone
- 1971–1973: Lyon
- 1973–1976: INF Vichy

Senior career*
| Years | Team | Apps | (Gls) |
| 1976–1980 | Lyon | 56 | (5) |
| 1980–1982 | Nîmes | 31 | (1) |
| 1982–1983 | Alès | 5 | (0) |
| 1983–1985 | Villefranche | | |
| Total | | 114+ | (11+) |

Managerial career
- 1986–1991: Lyon U19
- * Club domestic league appearances and goals

Guy Genet (born 14 August 1955) is a French former professional footballer who played as a defender. As of 2021, he works as a sports coordinator and kit man for Lyon; he started working in these roles in 1996.

== Personal life ==
Guy's son Alexis is also a former footballer.
