= Sébastien Flochon =

French footballer (born 1993)

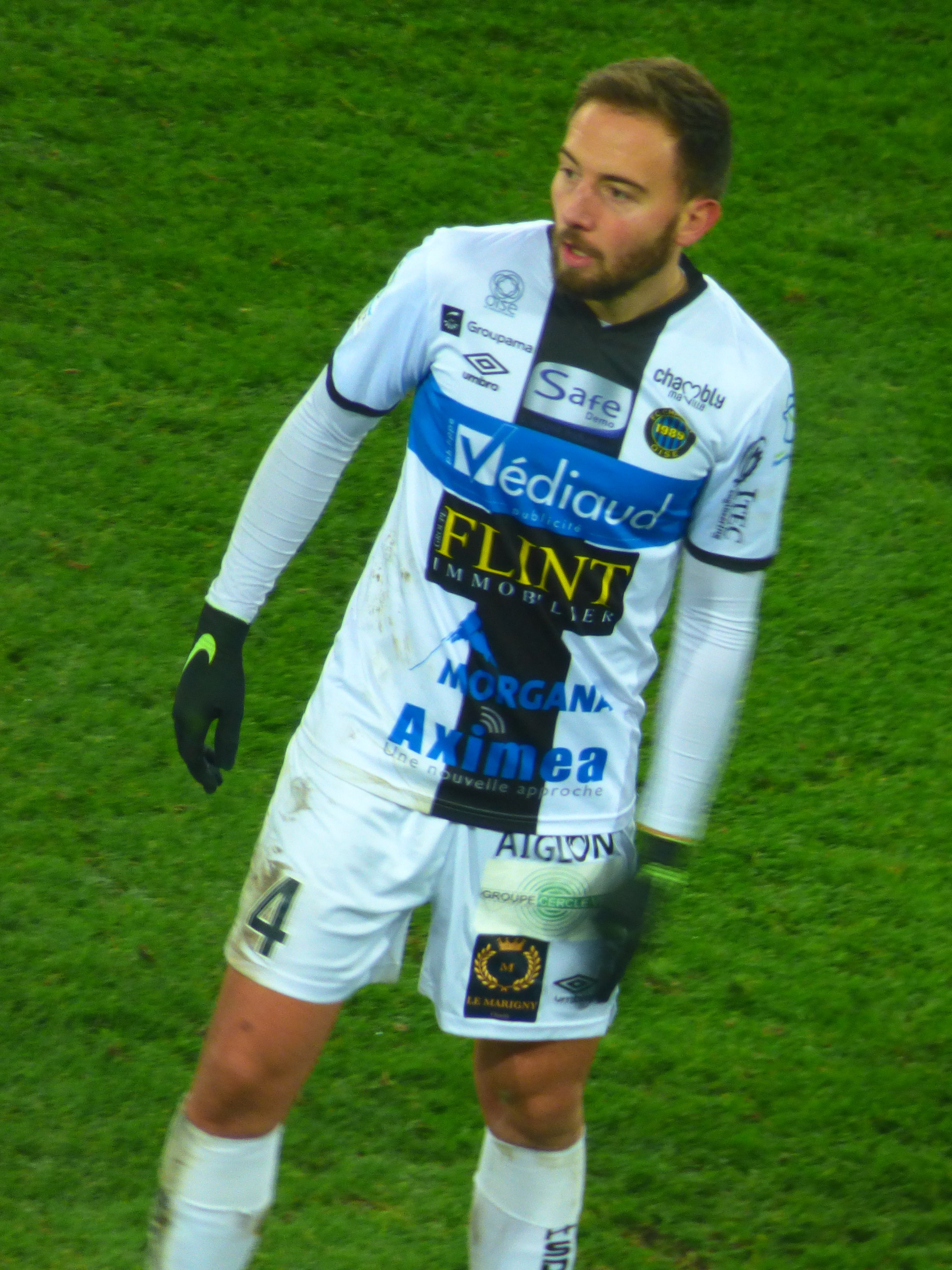
- Flochon in 2019

Personal information
- Date of birth: 19 January 1993 (age 33)
- Place of birth: Lyon, France
- Height: 1.81 m (5 ft 11 in)
- Position: Midfielder

Team information
- Current team: Saint-Priest

Youth career
- 2003–2011: Lyon

Senior career*
Years	Team	Apps	(Gls)
2011–2013	Lyon II	31	(0)
2013–2015	Le Havre II	23	(5)
2013–2015	Le Havre	5	(0)
2015–2017	CA Bastia	25	(1)
2017	Les Herbiers II	1	(0)
2017–2018	Les Herbiers	44	(0)
2018–2021	Chambly	53	(1)
2018–2021	Chambly II	2	(0)
2021–2022	Créteil	13	(0)
2022–2025	Boulogne	62	(1)
2025–	Saint-Priest	0	(0)
- * Club domestic league appearances and goals as of 16 May 2025

Sébastien Flochon (born 19 January 1993) is a French professional footballer who plays as a midfielder for Championnat National 1 club Saint-Priest.

== Career ==
On 8 May 2018, Flochon played as Paris Saint-Germain won 2–0 to clinch the 2017–18 Coupe de France with goals from Edinson Cavani and Giovani Lo Celso. He was the captain of Les Herbiers when they reached the 2018 Coupe de France Final. Flochon was allowed to lift the trophy with PSG skipper Thiago Silva as a reward for his side's terrific cup run to the final. In July 2021, he signed with Créteil.

== Personal life ==
Born in France, Flochon holds Italian and French nationalities. He is a good friend of France international Samuel Umtiti.

== Honours ==
Les Herbiers

- Coupe de France runner-up: 2017–18
