= Kamal Bafounta =

French footballer (born 2002)

Personal information
- Full name: Kamal Bafounta Ortega
- Date of birth: 8 January 2002 (age 24)
- Place of birth: Vénissieux, France
- Height: 1.93 m (6 ft 4 in)
- Position: Midfielder

Team information
- Current team: Lyon-La Duchère
- Number: 14

Youth career
- 2008: Vénissieux
- 2008–2012: Saint-Priest
- 2012–2013: Lyon
- 2013–2017: FC Lyon
- 2017–2018: Nantes
- 2018–2021: Borussia Dortmund

Senior career*
Years	Team	Apps	(Gls)
2021–2022	Borussia Dortmund II	3	(0)
2022–2024	Lorient B	22	(1)
2023–2024	→ Cholet (loan)	9	(0)
2024–2025	Tabor Sežana	20	(2)
2025–	Lyon-La Duchère	7	(0)

International career^{‡}
2017	France U16	5	(0)
- * Club domestic league appearances and goals as of 7 February 2026 ‡ National team caps and goals as of 22:25, 24 July 2021 (UTC)

Kamal Bafounta Ortega (born 8 January 2002) is a French footballer who plays as a midfielder for Championnat National 3 club Lyon-La Duchère.

== Club career ==
On 21 September 2023, Bafounta joined Cholet on loan.

== International career ==
Bafounta was born in France to a Congolese father and Spanish mother. He holds both French and Spanish nationalities. He has represented France at under-16 level.

== Career statistics ==
=== Club ===
As of 24 July 2021

Appearances and goals by club, season and competition
Club	Season	League			Cup		Continental		Other		Total	
Club	Season	Division	Apps	Goals	Apps	Goals	Apps	Goals	Apps	Goals	Apps	Goals
Borussia Dortmund II	2021–22	3. Liga	1	0	–		–		0	0	1	0
Career total			1	0	0	0	0	0	0	0	1	0
