= Gueïda Fofana =

French footballer (born 1991)

Personal information
- Date of birth: 16 May 1991 (age 35)
- Place of birth: Le Havre, France
- Height: 1.82 m (6 ft 0 in)
- Position: Defensive midfielder

Youth career
- 1998–2001: ES Mont-Gaillard
- 2001–2009: Le Havre

Senior career*
Years	Team	Apps	(Gls)
2009–2011	Le Havre	64	(4)
2011–2017	Lyon	72	(4)
2011–2016	Lyon B	8	(0)
Total		144	(8)

International career
2006–2007	France U16	13	(2)
2007–2008	France U17	18	(4)
2008–2009	France U18	9	(0)
2009–2010	France U19	13	(1)
2010–2012	France U20	17	(2)
2012	France U21	2	(1)

Managerial career
- 2019–2025: Lyon B
- 2025: RWDM
- 2025–: Lyon B
Medal record
Men's football
Representing France
UEFA European Under-17 Championship
Runner-up	2008 Turkey
- * Club domestic league appearances and goals

Gueïda Fofana (French pronunciation: [ɡejda fɔfana]; born 16 May 1991) is a former French footballer. He was a French youth international and has captained at all levels of youth. In 2010, he captained the France team that won the 2010 UEFA European Under-19 Football Championship on home soil. He operated as a defensive midfielder, but could also play as a defender and was known for his physical style of play. Fofana had been compared to Arsenal legend Patrick Vieira, however he was forced to retire on 18 January 2017 due to ongoing injury problems.

== Club career ==
=== Le Havre ===
Fofana began his career playing for hometown club ES Mont-Gaillard. The youngster drew the interest of Le Havre, which he initially rejected preferring to play with his friends and remain close to his family. However, after constant inquiries, Fofana accepted and joined the club at age 12. While in the club's training center, Fofana developed into youth international and one of the club's most promising prospects, alongside the now-departed Paul Pogba, captaining several of the team's youth squads. In 2008, he signed an élite contract until June 2011. In the 2008–09 season, despite being 17 years old, he appeared on the bench as a senior team player for several matches, though he didn't make an appearance, mainly due to dealing with the rigorous effects of a herniated disc. The club suffered relegation from Ligue 1 in the 2008–09 season and, for the 2009–10 season, Fofana began training with the first team on a permanent basis.

In the club's first competitive match of the new campaign, Fofana appeared on the bench in the club's 2–1 loss to Tours in the Coupe de la Ligue. He made his professional debut on 18 August 2009 in a league match against Tours appearing as a substitute in the 78th minute. Le Havre, again, lost to Tours 2–0. Fofana earned his first start on 26 September 2009 playing the entire 90 minutes in the club's 2–0 victory over Metz. On 26 November, Fofana scored his first professional goal in the club's 1–0 victory over AC Ajaccio. Two weeks later, Fofana earn his first professional red card after accumulating two yellow cards in only 26 minutes in a 1–0 defeat to Clermont. He finished the campaign with 31 total appearances and one goal.

Fofana began the 2010–11 season as a starter in the midfield. On 20 August 2010, he assisted on Le Havre's opening goal in a 2–1 victory over Stade Reims. On 3 December, Fofana scored his first goal of the season in a 2–1 victory over Metz. After a failed January 2011 transfer to English club Aston Villa, on 28 January 2011, Fofana signed his first professional contract agreeing to a three-year deal with Le Havre.

=== Lyon ===
On the final day of the summer transfer window, Lyon confirmed on its official website that the club had signed Fofana from Le Havre. Fofana agreed to a four-year contract and the transfer fee was priced at €1.8 million. The fee could reach €2.6 million based on incentives. Fofana described the move to Lyon as "a great satisfaction" and was given the number 15 shirt. He simultaneously made his club and European debut on 14 September 2011 in the team's 0–0 draw with Dutch club Ajax in the UEFA Champions League.

=== Retirement ===
On 18 January 2017, Fofana announced his retirement from professional football due to persistent injury problems with his ankle.

== International career ==
Fofana has been active with France on the youth level having appeared at all levels. Prior to representing France on international level, Fofana earned regional caps with Normandy at age 13. He made his international youth debut with the under-16 team in the team's opening match against the Republic of Ireland in a 1–1 draw. On 5 December, Fofana scored his first youth international goal converting a penalty in the team's 4–1 victory over Turkey. Fofana finished his under-16 career playing against Germany at the Olympic Stadium in Berlin on 30 May 2006. Germany won the match 1–0 with Felix Kroos scoring the lone goal. With the under-17 team, Fofana was named captain of the team by coach Francis Smerecki and scored his first goal on his debut in a 4–0 victory over Switzerland. In qualification for the 2008 UEFA European Under-17 Football Championship, Fofana scored a brace against Albania in the first qualifying round. He also captained the team to a second-place finish at the Algarve Cup in Portugal scoring his lone goal in a group stage match against the hosts. At the 2008 UEFA European Under-17 Football Championship, Fofana led the team to the final where they were defeated 4–0 by Spain.

With the under-18 team, he captained the squad that played against England at Wembley Stadium. France won the match 4–2 and Fofana, as captain, was presented with the Fallenhero Trophy by The Football Association chairman Trevor Brooking. On 9 September 2009, Fofana made his debut with the under-19 team in the team's opening group stage match at the Sendaï Cup against Japan. He scored his first goal for the team on 9 October in a 4–2 defeat to the Netherlands. After consistently appearing with the team for the campaign, on 7 June 2010, Fofana was named to coach Francis Smerecki's 18-man squad to participate in the 2010 UEFA European Under-19 Football Championship and was designated as the team's captain. He featured in four of the team's five matches including the final match against Spain, which France won 2–1. The title is the country's second UEFA Under-19 championship.

Due to France's victory at the UEFA Under-19 championship, the nation qualified for the 2011 FIFA U-20 World Cup, which merited under-20 team appearances for Fofana. He was installed as captain for the fifth consecutive season by Smerecki and made his debut with the team on 7 October 2010 in a friendly match against Portugal, which ended 3–3. Fofana, subsequently, captained the team in four more matches during the 2010–11 campaign and, on 10 June 2011, was named to the 21-man squad to participate in the U-20 World Cup. He made his debut in the competition on 30 July 2011 in the team's 4–1 defeat to the hosts Colombia. In the team's next group stage match against South Korea, he scored the game-winning goal in a 3–1 victory.

== Managerial career ==
Fofana began his managerial career as assistant manager to Christian Bassila for Lyon's reserve team in the 2018–19 season before becoming manager on 28 May 2019, ahead of the 2019–20 season. Fofana led the team to a 7th place finish in his first season in charge, improving on the previous two season's 12th and 11th place finishes. In April 2025, he became the head coach of Challenger Pro League side RWD Molenbeek during the promotion play-offs.

== Personal life ==
Fofana was born in France is of Malian and Mauritanian descent. He is the brother of the professional footballers Guessouma and Mamadou Fofana.

== Career statistics ==
=== Club ===
Appearances and goals by club, season and competition
Club	Season	League			Cup (Note: Includes Coupe de France, Coupe de la Ligue, Trophée des Champions.)		Europe (Note: Includes UEFA Supercup.)		Total	
Club	Season	Division	Apps	Goals	Apps	Goals	Apps	Goals	Apps	Goals
Le Havre	2009–10	Ligue 2	30	1	1	0	0	0	31	1
Le Havre	2010–11	Ligue 2	34	3	2	0	0	0	36	3
Le Havre	Total		64	4	3	0	0	0	67	4
Lyon	2011–12	Ligue 1	18	0	4	0	3	0	25	0
Lyon	2012–13	Ligue 1	27	2	2	1	6	2	35	5
Lyon	2013–14	Ligue 1	25	2	3	0	5	2	33	4
Lyon	2014–15	Ligue 1	2	0	0	0	0	0	2	0
Lyon	2015–16	Ligue 1	0	0	0	0	0	0	0	0
Lyon	Total		72	4	9	1	14	4	95	9
Career total			136	8	12	1	14	4	162	13

== Honours ==
Lyon

- Coupe de France: 2011–12
- Trophée des Champions: 2012
- Coupe de la Ligue runner-up: 2012

France U19

- UEFA European Under-19 Football Championship: 2010

France U20

- FIFA U-20 World Cup fourth place: 2011
