= Sidy Koné =

Malian footballer

Personal information
- Date of birth: 6 June 1992 (age 34)
- Place of birth: Bamako, Mali
- Height: 1.85 m (6 ft 1 in)
- Position: Defensive midfielder

Youth career
- 2007–2010: Jeanne D'Arc Bamako
- 2010–2011: Lyon

Senior career*
Years	Team	Apps	(Gls)
2010–2014	Lyon II	43	(0)
2011–2015	Lyon	2	(0)
2013	→ Caen II (loan)	9	(0)
2017–2018	Niort II		
2018–2019	Thonon Évian		

International career
2010–2011	Mali U20		
2011–2015	Mali	3	(0)
- * Club domestic league appearances and goals

Sidy Koné (born 6 June 1992), also known as Sidi Koné, is a Malian former professional footballer who played as a defensive midfielder.

== Club career ==
Born in Bamako, Koné joined Lyon in 2010 after playing for Jeanne d'Arc Bamako in his home country. He spent the 2010–11 season playing on the club's reserve team in the Championnat de France amateur, the fourth level of French football. He appeared in 13 matches, scoring one goal as the team won the league's reserves' title. Ahead of the 2011–12 season, Koné was promoted to the senior team permanently by new manager Rémi Garde and was assigned the number 22 shirt. He made his professional debut on 20 August 2011 in a 1–1 league draw with Brest. In the match, Koné received his first professional red card.

Koné spent the second half of the 2012–13 season on loan at Stade Malherbe Caen in Ligue 2. He did not make an appearance.

In May 2017, he trialled with Chamois Niortais.

In August 2018, Koné joined French seventh-tier side Thonon Évian F.C.

== International career ==
Koné is a former Mali youth international. He played at under-20 level, participating in qualification matches for the 2011 African Youth Championship and the tournament itself. Despite helping the team to a fourth-place finish at the competition, Koné was not included in the team for the 2011 FIFA U-20 World Cup. On 4 August 2011, he was called up to the senior team for the first time for a friendly match against Tunisia. Koné earned his first cap in the match, which ended in a 4–2 defeat, appearing as a second-half substitute for Sambou Yatabaré.
