= Maxime Blanc =

French professional footballer (born 1992)

Personal information
- Date of birth: 23 January 1992 (age 34)
- Place of birth: Avignon, France
- Height: 1.67 m (5 ft 6 in)
- Position: Midfielder

Team information
- Current team: Cannes
- Number: 10

Senior career*
Years	Team	Apps	(Gls)
2010–2013	Lyon II	66	(12)
2013–2014	Evian II	10	(2)
2013–2014	Evian	1	(0)
2014–2015	Arles-Avignon	27	(1)
2016	Espérance Pernoise		
2016–2017	Châteauroux	11	(1)
2017	Chambly	9	(0)
2017–2021	Villefranche	107	(22)
2021–2022	FBBP01	27	(3)
2022–2024	Villefranche	52	(9)
2024–	Cannes	9	(0)
- * Club domestic league appearances and goals as of 16 November 2024

Maxime Blanc (born 23 January 1992) is a French professional footballer who plays as a midfielder for Ligue 3 club Cannes.

== Career ==
A product of the Lyon Academy, Blanc signed a three-year deal with Ligue 1 side Evian in July 2013. He made his senior debut, and only league appearance, for Evian in a 3–0 defeat to Nantes on 5 October 2013. In July 2014 he was given permission to trial with Ligue 2 side Arles-Avignon. He subsequently terminated his contract with Evian and signed with Arles-Avignon. He scores his first senior goal whilst with Arles-Avignon, on 1 May 2015, in a 2–0 win over Créteil.

After leaving Arles-Avignon at the end of the 2014–15 season, Blanc spent time with sixth-tier Espérance Pernoise before signing for Châteauroux in the summer of 2016. He stayed only a few months at Châteauroux, before agreeing an 18-month contract with Chambly.

In June 2017, Blanc signed with Villefranche, dropping a division to Championnat National 2.

On 22 June 2021, he signed with FBBP01.

On 17 June 2022, Blanc agreed to return to Villefranche.
