= Abdoulaye Ouattara (footballer, born 2001) =

French footballer (born 2001)

Personal information
- Full name: Abdoulaye Ouattara
- Date of birth: 8 January 2001 (age 25)
- Place of birth: Montreuil, France
- Height: 1.80 m (5 ft 11 in)
- Position: Defensive midfielder

Youth career
- 2008: Romainville CA
- 2009−2013: FC Romainville
- 2014−2016: CS Bonneuil-sur-Marne
- 2017−2021: Lyon

Senior career*
Years	Team	Apps	(Gls)
2019	Lyon II	1	(0)
2022	Senica	6	(0)
2022–2023	Episkopi		
2023–2024	Sarre-Union	11	(0)
2023–2024	Sarre-Union II	2	(0)
- * Club domestic league appearances and goals as of 30 June 2024

Abdoulaye Ouattara (born 8 January 2001) is a French professional footballer who plays as a defensive midfielder.

== Early life ==
Ouattara began playing youth football with Romainville CA in 2008, before later joining FC Romainville, with whom he played for four years until U12 level. At U13 level, he joined CS Bonneuil-sur-Marne, playing with them through U15 level. At U16 level, he joined the Lyon youth system.

== Club career ==
In February 2022, Ouattara signed with Slovak Fortuna Liga club FK Senica.

In June 2022, Ouattara signed with Super League Greece 2 club Episkopi.

In October 2023, he signed with US Sarre-Union in the French fifth tier Championnat National 3.

== Personal life ==
Ouattara has both French and Ivorian citizenship.
