= Stéphane Solomenko =

French footballer (born 1960)

Personal information
- Full name: Stéphane Solomenko
- Date of birth: November 14, 1960 (age 65)
- Place of birth: Oullins, France
- Height: 1.73 m (5 ft 8 in)
- Position: Striker

Senior career*
Years	Team	Apps	(Gls)
1979–1982	Lyon	3	(0)
1982–1984	Montceau	27	(6)
1984–1986	Sedan	54	(8)
1986–1987	Orléans	33	(4)
1987–1989	Chamois Niortais	39	(0)
1989–1990	Quimper	23	(0)
1990–1992	Saint-Quentin	60	(1)
- * Club domestic league appearances and goals

Stéphane Solomenko (born November 14, 1960) is a former professional footballer who played as a striker.

Solomenko had a three-year spell with Olympique Lyonnais, a few years before his brother, Philippe, signed with the club.
