= Dylan Mboumbouni =

Footballer (born 1996)

Personal information
- Full name: Dylan Teddy Ngallot Mboumbouni
- Date of birth: 20 February 1996 (age 30)
- Place of birth: Lyon, France
- Height: 1.82 m (6 ft 0 in)
- Position: Centre-back

Team information
- Current team: Chindia Târgoviște
- Number: 4

Youth career
- 2002–2005: AS Cheminots Saint-Priest
- 2005–2014: Lyon

Senior career*
Years	Team	Apps	(Gls)
2014–2019	Lyon B	77	(1)
2018	→ Cholet (loan)	12	(0)
2019–2022	Cholet	42	(0)
2022	Jerv	8	(0)
2023	Mioveni	5	(0)
2023–2024	IFK Haninge		
2024–2025	Concordia Chiajna	14	(1)
2025–	Chindia Târgoviște	19	(0)

International career^{‡}
2012	France U16	5	(0)
2017–	Central African Republic	11	(0)
- * Club domestic league appearances and goals as of 10 October 2026 ‡ National team caps and goals as of 14 November 2024

Dylan Teddy Ngallot Mboumbouni (born 20 February 1996) is a professional footballer who plays as a centre-back for Liga II club Chindia Târgoviște. Born in France, he plays for the Central African Republic national football team at international level.

== Club career ==
A member Olympique Lyonnais Reserves and Academy since 2005, Mboumbouni signed his first professional contract with Olympique Lyonnais on 13 May 2016. He received his selection senior Lyon squad in a Ligue 1 match against AS Monaco on 12 October 2017.

On 24 June 2019, SO Cholet announced the permanent signing of Mboumbouni, with the player penning a two-year deal with the Championnat National club.

On 1 August 2022, Mboumbouni signed with Jerv in Norway.

== International career ==
Mboumbouni was born in France and is Central African by descent, and was a youth international for France at the U16 level. He made his debut with the Central African Republic national football team in a friendly 3–0 loss to Algeria on 14 November 2017.

== Career statistics ==
=== International ===
As of match played 14 November 2024

Appearances and goals by national team and year
National team	Year	Apps	Goals
Central African Republic
Central African Republic	2017	1	0
Central African Republic	2019	4	0
Central African Republic	2020	2	0
Central African Republic	2021	1	0
Central African Republic	2023	1	0
Central African Republic	2024	2	0
Total		11	0
