= Francis Smerecki =

French football manager (1949–2018)

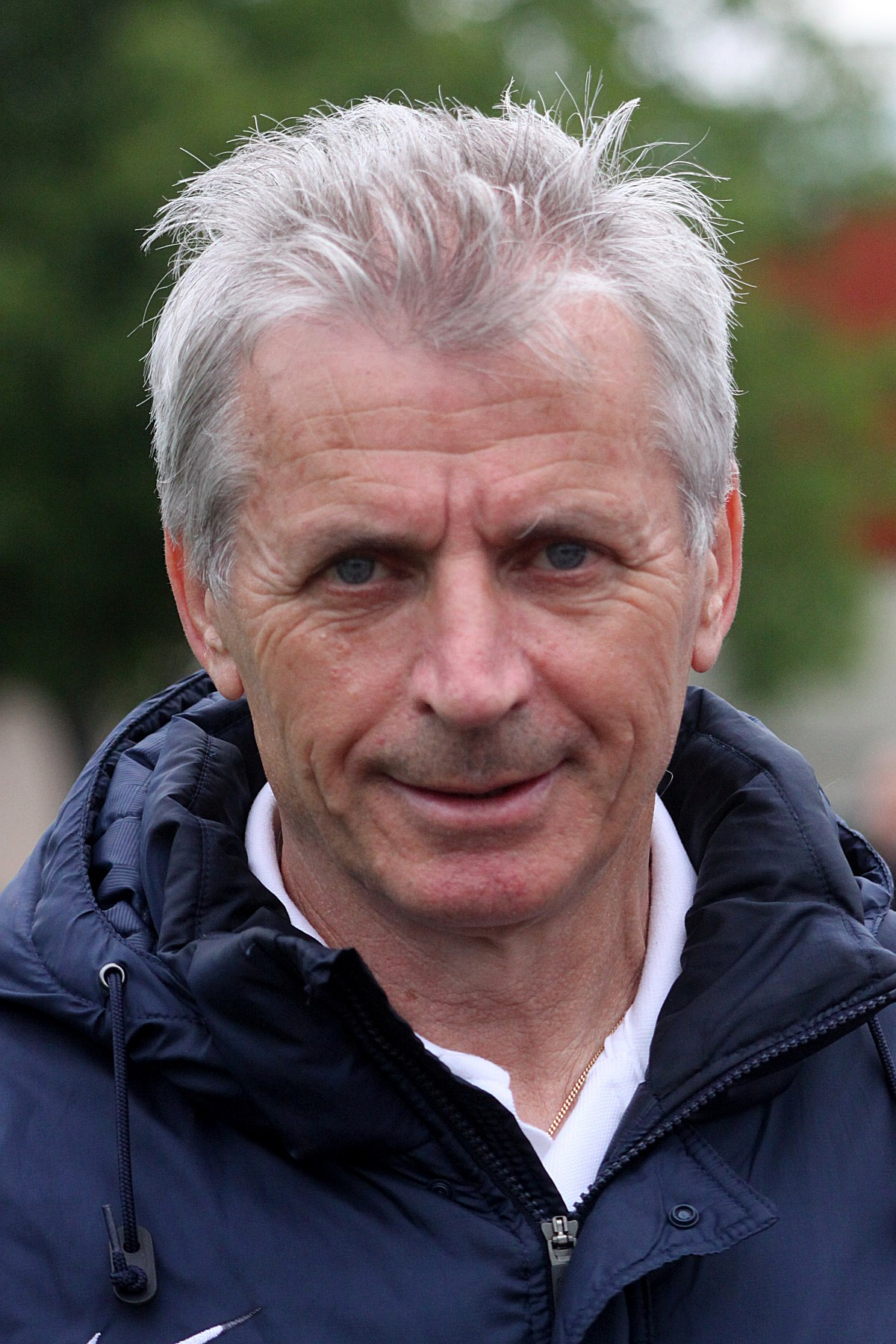
- Smerecki in 2013

Personal information
- Date of birth: 25 July 1949
- Place of birth: Le Mans, France
- Date of death: 7 June 2018 (aged 68)
- Position: Midfielder

Youth career
- 1961–1966: CO Pontlieu

Senior career*
Years	Team	Apps	(Gls)
1966–1974	Le Mans		
1968	Bataillon Joinville		
1974–1977	Laval	100	(13)
1977–1979	Paris FC		
1979–1984	Limoges		

Managerial career
- 1984–1985: Limoges
- 1985–1990: Dunkerque
- 1991–1992: Valenciennes
- 1993–1999: Guingamp
- 1999–2000: Le Havre
- 2000–2002: Nancy
- 2003–2004: Laval
- 2004–2015: France youth teams
- * Club domestic league appearances and goals

Francis Smerecki (25 July 1949 – 7 June 2018) was a French football player and manager. He was of Polish descent.
