= Lyon-La Duchère =

Football club based in Lyon, France

- Full name: Lyon-La Duchère
- Founded: 1964; 62 years ago
- Ground: Stade de Balmont
- Capacity: 5,600
- President: Jean-Christophe Vincent
- Manager: Lionel Bah
- League: National 1 Group C
- 2025–26: National 3 Group H, 1st of 14 (promoted)
- Website: www.lyonladuchere.fr
Home colours	Away colours

Lyon-La Duchère (formerly AS Lyon Duchère and Sporting Club de Lyon) is a French association football team founded in 1964 as Lyon Duchère Association Sportive and based in the La Duchère district of Lyon, France. It took its current name in June 2021 in a rebranding exercise to focus on the origin of the club, after a year-long spell without Duchère as part of the name. It currently plays in the Championnat National 1, the fourth tier in the French football league system. It plays at the Stade de Balmont in Lyon, which has a capacity of 5,600.

== History ==
=== Coupe de France success ===
Lyon Duchère have achieved success in France's most prestigious cup competition, the Coupe de France. They reached the Round of 16 twice in 2006 defeating two Ligue 1 sides in the process and in 2019. They have also reached the Round of 32 on three occasions, in 1995, 2007, and 2008.

=== Championnat National ===
Lyon Duchère competed in the Championnat National for the first time in the 2016–17 season. They had a relatively successful first season finishing in 7th position with 50 points. They were only four points away from qualifying to Ligue 2. They looked set for promotion until they lost their last three games of the season.

=== SC Lyon rebrand ===
In May 2019 the club held a poll of supporters to choose one of three new names. On 4 June 2020, it announced that the name Sporting Club de Lyon had been chosen, in order to appeal to a larger number of people from across the city.

=== Lyon La Duchère rebrand ===
A year later, after finishing last in the 2020–21 Championnat National, new president Jean-Christophe Vincent announced a rebrand of the club, in order to "turn the page on a sporting failure" and "return to the original identity of the club... [and] take a name that clearly recalls the origin and the raison d'être of this football club". The announcement was made on 1 June 2021.

At the end of the 2022–23 season, the club was administratively relegated to National 3 by the DNCG for financial reasons.

== Current squad ==
=== First team ===
As of 2 February 2026

Note: Flags indicate national team as defined under FIFA eligibility rules; some limited exceptions apply. Players may hold more than one non-FIFA nationality.

No.	Pos.	Nation	Player
1	GK	FRA	Alban Rambaud
3	DF	FRA	Maé Clavel
5	FW	GAB	Levy Ndoutoume
6	MF	FRA	Ilan Ihaddadene
8	MF	FRA	Rayane Chayebi
9	FW	FRA	Ilyes Boughanmi
10	FW	FRA	Sofiane Bourouis-Belle
11	MF	FRA	Mehdi Boussaïd
13	FW	FRA	Nathanaël Beta
14	MF	FRA	Kamal Bafounta
15	MF	FRA	Naïm Dhib
17	DF	FRA	Naïm Ighbane
18	FW	FRA	Omar Benyounes

No.	Pos.	Nation	Player
19	MF	FRA	Jérémie Laurent
20	DF	FRA	Romain Thunet
21	MF	FRA	Théo Owono
22	MF	FRA	Emmanuel Valey
23	DF	CAF	Yoan Zouma
24	DF	FRA	Malik Mazouni
25	FW	FRA	Karahali Souaré
27	DF	FRA	Matthéo Haon
28	MF	FRA	Yoann Martelat
40	GK	FRA	Enzo Vita
—	MF	FRA	Yanis Berrached
—	FW	FRA	Karim Belmahi

== Notable players ==
- (France) Eric Abidal
- (France) Sabri Lamouchi (youth)
