= 2011–12 Olympique Lyonnais season =

Lyon
2011–12 season
- Owner: OL Groupe
- Chairman: Jean-Michel Aulas
- Manager: Rémi Garde
- Stadium: Stade de Gerland
- Ligue 1: 4th
- Coupe de France: Winners
- Coupe de la Ligue: Runners-up
- UEFA Champions League: Round of 16
- Top goalscorer: League: Lisandro López (16); All: Bafétimbi Gomis (25)
- Highest home attendance: 40,099 (2 November vs Real Madrid, UEFA Champions League)
- Lowest home attendance: 7,000 (8 February vs Bordeaux, Coupe de France)
Home colours	Away colours	Third colours

The 2011–12 season of Olympique Lyonnais was the club's 53rd season in Ligue 1. After a third-place finish last season, the club played in the UEFA Champions League for the 12th consecutive season.

== News ==
At the end of the 2010–11 season, fans had become dissatisfied with then manager Claude Puel, despite the club managing to finish in third place, synonymous with qualification to the UEFA Champions League Play-off round. However, due to poor results and a falling out with the club's hierarchy, he was sacked. He was replaced by former technical coach Rémi Garde, who announced his intentions to compete for the league title.

On 17 June, Lyon announced the departure of midfielder Jérémy Toulalan to Málaga for €10 million.

During pre-season training, Yoann Gourcuff suffered another injury blow, this time to his left ankle, which required an operation keeping him out for at least a month.

On 16 July, Brazilian midfielder Ederson was injured to the right knee during a pre-season match against Racing Genk after a collision with teammate Dejan Lovren.

On 12 August Lyon announce the signing of Burkina Faso international defender Bakary Koné from Guingamp for €2 million.

On 27 August, during a match against Montpellier, forward Lisandro López injured his ankle. It was originally feared that he had broken his ankle, as the striker believed he had heard a crack, but scans later allayed these fears. Nevertheless, the Argentine will be out for several weeks.

On 30 August Lyon signed defender Mouhamadou Dabo from Sevilla for a modest €1 million that could rise to €1.8 million if certain playing criteria are met.

On summer transfer deadline day, Lyon announced the sale of Bosnian international midfielder Miralem Pjanić to Roma for €11 million, and the arrival of midfielder Gueïda Fofana from Le Havre for €1.8 million, possibly rising to €2.6 million.

On 28 September, the club announced that Michel Bastos had signed a two-year contract extension keeping him at the club until 2015.

On 30 March, the club issued a press release confirming that forward Alexandre Lacazette had signed a contract extension until 2016, and that defender Samuel Umtiti had signed his first professional contract at the club. The latter deal comes after the young central defender's successful promotion into the club's first team in recent months.

== Transfers ==
=== Summer in ===
No.	Pos.	Nat.	Name	Age	EU	Moving from	Type	Transfer window	Ends	Transfer fee	Source
37	DF	(France)	Fontaine	20	EU	Youth system	Promoted ✓	Summer		Youth system	OLWeb
48	MF	(France)	Reale	19	EU	Youth system	Promoted ✓	Summer	2014	Youth system	OLWeb
4	DF	(Burkina Faso)	Koné	23	EU	Guingamp (France)	Transferred ✓	Summer	2016	€2M	OLWeb
14	DF	(France)	Dabo	24	EU	Sevilla (Spain)	Transferred ✓	Summer	2015	€1M to €1.8M	ESPN Soccernet
15	MF	(France)	Fofana	20	EU	Le Havre	Transferred ✓	Summer	2015	€1.8M to €2.6M	OLWeb
26	DF	(Ghana)	Mensah	28	Non-EU	Sunderland (England)	Loan Return ✓	Summer	2013	N/a	Africasoccernet
27	FW	(France)	Tafer	20	EU	Toulouse	Loan Return ✓	Summer		N/a	AllezTFC
46	DF	(France)	Abenzoar	22	EU	Arles-Avignon	Loan Return ✓	Summer	2012	N/a	
35	DF	(France)	Seguin	21	EU	Dijon	Loan Return ✓	Summer		N/a	

Total spending: ▼€4.8 million

=== Summer out ===
No.	Pos.	Nat.	Name	Age	EU	Moving to	Type	Transfer window	Transfer fee	Source
28	MF	(France)	Toulalan	27	EU	Málaga (Spain)	Transferred ✓	Summer	€10M	AS
19	MF	(Argentina)	Delgado	29	Non-EU	Monterrey (Mexico)	Contract Expired ✓	Summer	Free	L'Equipe
8	MF	(Bosnia and Herzegovina)	Pjanić	21	EU	Roma (Italy)	Transferred ✓	Summer	€11M	OLWeb
45	GK	(France)	Gorgelin	20	EU	Red Star	Loaned ✓	Summer	N/a	OLWeb
48	MF	(France)	Reale	19	EU	Boulogne	Loaned ✓	Summer	N/a	OLWeb
15	FW	(France)	Novillo	19	EU	Le Havre	Loaned ✓	Summer	N/a	OLWeb
46	DF	(France)	Abenzoar	22	EU	Vannes	Loaned ✓	Summer	N/a	OLWeb
4	DF	(Senegal)	Diakhaté	27	Non-EU	Dynamo Kyiv (Ukraine)	End of Loan ✓	Summer	N/a	

Total income: ▲€21 million

=== Winter in ===
No.	Pos.	Nat.	Name	Age	EU	Moving from	Type	Transfer window	Ends	Transfer fee	Source
36	DF	(United Arab Emirates)	Al Kamali	22	Non-EU	Al-Wehda (United Arab Emirates)	Loan ✓	Winter	2012		OLWeb

=== Winter out ===
No.	Pos.	Nat.	Name	Age	EU	Moving to	Type	Transfer window	Transfer fee	Source
2	DF	(Senegal)	Gassama	22	EU	Lorient (France)	Transferred ✓	Winter	Undisclosed	OLWeb
39	FW	(Algeria)	Belfodil	20	EU	Bologna (Italy)	Loaned ✓	Winter	N/a	OLWeb

== Squad information ==
N	Pos.	Nat.	Name	Age	EU	Since	App	Goals	Ends	Transfer fee	Notes
1	GK	(France)	Lloris	39	EU	2008			2013	€8.5M	
3	DF	(Brazil)	Cris (captain)	49	EU	2004			2013	€3.5M	
4	DF	(Burkina Faso)	Koné	38	EU	2011			2016	€2M	
5	DF	(Croatia)	Lovren	37	EU	2010 (Winter)			2014	€10M	
6	MF	(Sweden)	Källström	44	EU	2006			2012	€8M	
7	FW	(France)	Briand	41	EU	2010			2014	€6M	
8	MF	(France)	Gourcuff	40	EU	2010			2015	€22M	
9	FW	(Argentina)	Lisandro	43	EU	2009			2014	€24M	
10	MF	(Brazil)	Ederson	40	Non-EU	2008			2013	€15M	
11	MF	(Brazil)	Bastos	43	EU	2009			2015	€18M	
12	DF	(France)	Kolodziejczak	35	EU	2008			2013	€2.25M	
13	DF	(France)	Réveillère	47	EU	2003			2013	Free	
14	DF	(France)	Dabo	39	EU	2011			2015	€1M	
15	MF	(France)	Fofana	35	EU	2011			2015	€1.8M	
17	FW	(France)	Lacazette	35	EU	2009			2016	Youth system	
18	FW	(France)	Gomis	41	EU	2009			2014	€13M	
19	FW	(France)	Briand	41	EU	2010			2014	€6M	
20	DF	(France)	Cissokho	39	EU	2009			2014	€15M	
21	MF	(France)	Gonalons	37	EU	2009			2014	Youth system	
22	MF	(Mali)	Koné	34	EU	2010			2014		
23	DF	(France)	Umtiti	32	EU	2012			2015	Youth system	
24	FW	(France)	Pied	36	EU	2009			2014	Youth system	
26	DF	(Ghana)	Mensah	43	Non-EU	2008			2013	€8.4M	
27	FW	(France)	Tafer	35	EU	2008			2012	Youth system	
28	MF	(France)	Grenier	35	EU	2008			2014	Youth system	
30	GK	(France)	Vercoutre	46	EU	2002			2014	Free	
36	DF	(France)	Faure	35	EU	2000			2012	Youth system	
37	DF	(France)	Fontaine	35	EU	2006			2012	Youth system	
39	FW	(Algeria)	Belfodil	34	EU	2009			2014	Youth system	

- Last updated: 28 January 2012
- Source: OLWeb

== Club ==
=== Coaching staff ===
Position	Staff
Manager	(France) Rémi Garde
Assistant manager	(France) Patrick Collot
Second team manager	(France) Bruno Genesio
First team coach	(France) Christophe Toni
Striker coach	(Brazil) Sonny Anderson
Goalkeeper coach	(France) Joël Bats
Team doctor	(France) Emmanuel Ohrant
Physiotherapist	(France) Sylvain Rousseau
Physiotherapist	(France) Patrick Perret
Physiotherapist	(France) Abdeljelil Redissi
Fitness coach	(France) Alexandre Dellal
Fitness coach	(France) Robert Duverne
Intendant	(France) Guy Genet
Intendant	(France) Jérôme Renaud

Last updated: 26 September 2011
Source: OLweb

=== Other information ===
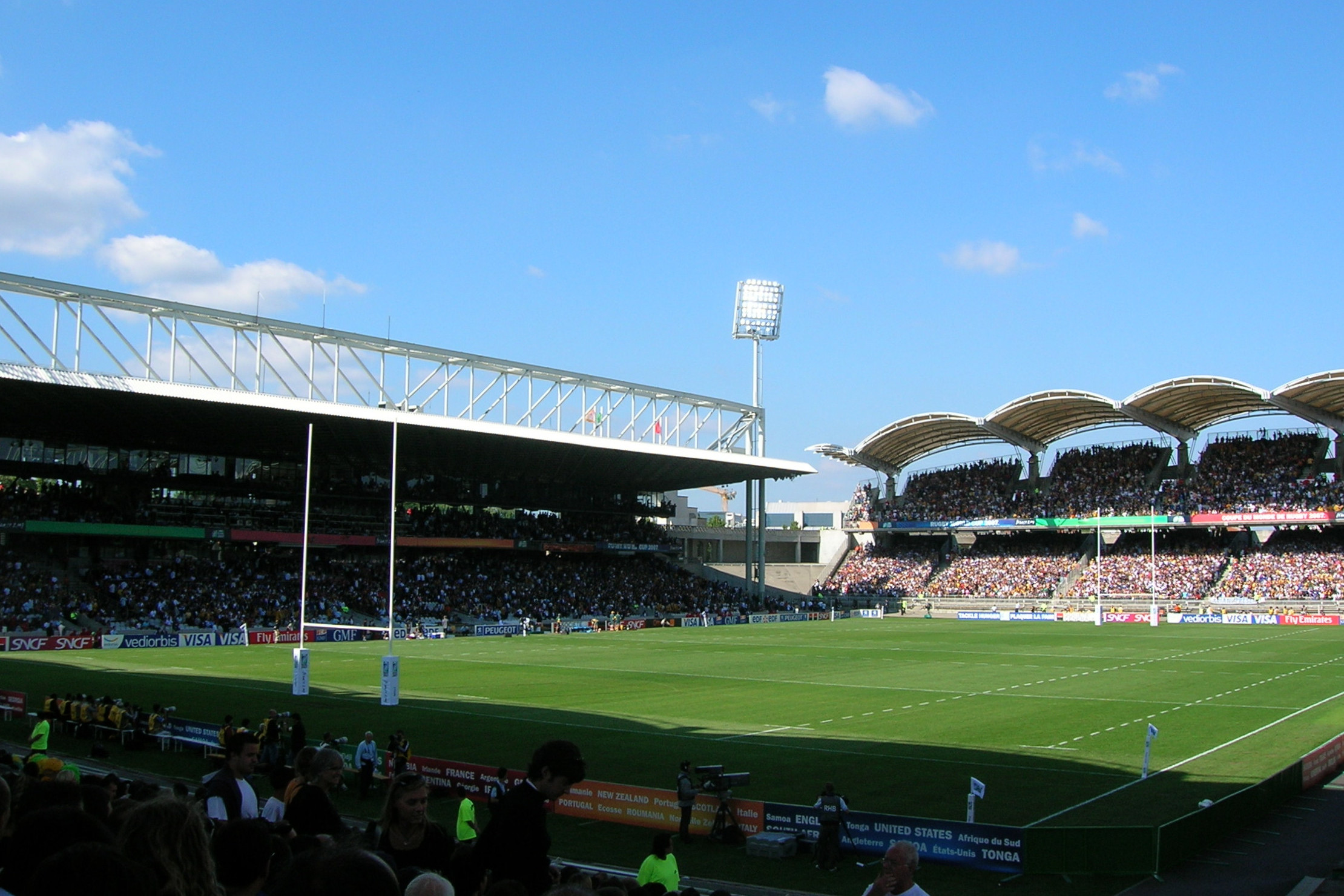
Stade de Gerland, current stadia of Lyon.

Club President	(France) Jean-Michel Aulas
Special Advisor	(France) Bernard Lacombe
Financial Director	(France) Emmanuelle Sarrabay
Director of Accounting	(France) Didier Kermarrec
Director of Communications	(France) Olivier Blanc
Marketing Director	(France) Vincent-Baptiste Closon
Youth Academy Director	(France) Stéphane Roche
Sporting Co-ordinator	(France) Guy Genet
Press Officer	(France) Pierre Bideau
Club Ambassador	(Brazil) Sonny Anderson
Ground (capacity and dimensions)	Stade de Gerland (41,044 / 112x65 meters)

Updated to match played 28 September 2011
Source: Ligue 1

== Pre-season ==
8 July 2011	Red Bull Salzburg (Austria)	1–0	(France) Lyon	Salzburg
17:30 UTC	Cziommer 22'	Report		Stadium: Red Bull Arena

16 July 2011	Genk (Belgium)	3–1	(France) Lyon	Genk
15:15 UTC	Barda 10'; Limbombe 20'; Pavlov 81'	Report	Briand 39'	Stadium: Cristal Arena

24 July 2011	Hannover 96 (Germany)	0–0	(France) Lyon	Hanover
15:00 UTC		Report		Stadium: AWD-Arena

27 July 2011	Shakhtar Donetsk (Ukraine)	1–1	(France) Lyon	Donetsk
17:00 UTC	Jádson 68' (pen.)	Report	Bastos 78' (pen.)	Stadium: Donbas Arena; Attendance: 46,000

31 July 2011	Porto (Portugal)	1–2	(France) Lyon	Lancy, Geneva
17:00 UTC	Rúben Micael 11'	Report	López 8'; Bastos 81'	Stadium: Stade de Genève

4 January 2012 Friendly match	Bastia (France)	0–2	(France) Lyon	Bastia, France
16:00 UTC		Report	27', 29' López	Stadium: Stade Armand Cesari; Attendance: 3,500

== Competitions ==
=== Ligue 1 ===
==== League table ====
Pos	Team	Pld	W	D	L	GF	GA	GD	Pts	Qualification or relegation
2	Paris Saint-Germain	38	23	10	5	75	41	+34	79	Qualification to Champions League group stage
3	Lille	38	21	11	6	72	39	+33	74	Qualification to Champions League play-off round
4	Lyon	38	19	7	12	64	51	+13	64	Qualification to Europa League group stage (Note: Lyon won the 2011–12 Coupe de France and thus qualified for the group stage of the 2012–13 UEFA Europa League. Since they finished 4th, the spot for the Europa League play-off round goes to the fifth-placed team.)
5	Bordeaux	38	16	13	9	53	41	+12	61	Qualification to Europa League play-off round
6	Rennes	38	17	9	12	53	44	+9	60	

Source: Ligue 1
Rules for classification: 1) points; 2) goal difference; 3) number of goals scored.

==== Results summary ====
Overall								Home						Away					
Pld	W	D	L	GF	GA	GD	Pts	W	D	L	GF	GA	GD	W	D	L	GF	GA	GD
38	19	7	12	64	51	+13	64	13	3	3	44	27	+17	6	4	9	20	24	−4

Source: Ligue 1

==== Results by round ====
Round	1	2	3	4	5	6	7	8	9	10	11	12	13	14	15	16	17	18	19	20	21	22	23	24	25	26	27	28	29	30	31	32	33	34	35	36	37	38
Ground	A	H	A	H	A	H	A	H	A	H	A	H	A	H	A	H	A	H	A	A	H	A	H	A	H	A	H	A	H	A	H	A	H	A	H	H	A	H
Result	W	D	D	W	W	W	L	W	L	W	L	W	L	L	W	W	W	W	L	L	W	D	L	L	D	L	W	W	W	D	W	L	W	W	W	D	D	L
Position	3	6	5	2	2	1	3	2	3	3	5	4	4	5	5	4	4	4	4	4	4	4	4	6	5	7	7	5	5	4	4	4	4	4	4	4	4	4

Source: Ligue 1
A = Away; H = Home; W = Win; D = Draw; L = Loss

==== Matches ====
Win Draw Loss

6 August 2011 1	Nice	1–3	Lyon	Nice
20:00 CET	Mounier 6'	Report	López 10'; Gomis 33'; Gonalons 74'	Stadium: Stade du Ray; Attendance: 14,405; Referee: Stéphane Lannoy (Nord-Pas-de-Calais)

13 August 2011 2	Lyon	1–1	Ajaccio	Lyon
18:00 CET	López 83'	Report	Sammaritano 59'	Stadium: Stade de Gerland; Attendance: 30,746; Referee: Hervé Piccirillo (Provence-Alpes-Côte d'Azur)

20 August 2011 3	Brest	1–1	Lyon	Brest
18:00 CET	Lesoimier 12'	Report	Gomis 69'	Stadium: Stade Francis-Le Blé; Attendance: 14,693; Referee: Fredy Fautrel (Lower Normandy)

27 August 2011 4	Lyon	2–1	Montpellier	Lyon
20:00 CET	Pjanić 49'; Pied 83'	Report	Bedimo 90+1'	Stadium: Stade de Gerland; Attendance: 31,634; Referee: Antony Gautier (Nord-Pas-de-Calais)

10 September 2011 5	Dijon	1–2	Lyon	Dijon
18:00 CET	Corgnet 43'	Report	Bamba 54' (o.g.); Gomis 54'	Stadium: Stade Gaston Gérard; Attendance: 14,325; Referee: Olivier Thual (Aquitaine)

18 September 2011 6	Lyon	2–0	Marseille	Lyon
20:00 CET	Gomis 17'; Bastos 29'	Report		Stadium: Stade de Gerland; Attendance: 38,010; Referee: Laurent Duhamel (Upper Normandy)

21 September 2011 7	Caen	1–0	Lyon	Caen
18:00 CET	Nivet 45+2'	Report		Stadium: Stade Michel d'Ornano; Attendance: 16,644; Referee: Saïd Ennjimi (Centre)

24 September 2011 8	Lyon	3–1	Bordeaux	Lyon
18:00 CET	Gomis 8', 33'; Bastos 64'	Report	Modeste 64' (pen.)	Stadium: Stade de Gerland; Attendance: 30,806; Referee: Lionel Jaffredo (Brittany)

2 October 2011 9	Paris Saint-Germain	2–0	Lyon	Paris
20:00 CET	Pastore 64'; Jallet 90'	Report		Stadium: Parc des Princes; Attendance: 44,450; Referee: Stéphane Lannoy (Nord-Pas-de-Calais)

15 October 2011 10	Lyon	3–1	Nancy	Lyon
18:00 CET	Bastos 26', 31' (pen.); Gomis 28'	Report	Jung 88'	Stadium: Stade de Gerland; Attendance: 33,825; Referee: Ruddy Buquet (Picardy)

23 October 2011 11	Lille	3–1	Lyon	Villeneuve-d'Ascq
20:00 CET	Sow 45+1'; Baša 65'; Cole 83'	Report	Briand 22'	Stadium: Stadium Nord Lille Métropole; Attendance: 17,247; Referee: Fredy Fautrel (Lower Normandy)

29 October 2011 12	Lyon	2–0	Saint-Étienne	Lyon
20:00 CET	Briand 82'; Gourcuff 90+1'	Report		Stadium: Stade de Gerland; Attendance: 38,982; Referee: Tony Chapron (Rhône-Alpes)

6 November 2011 13	Sochaux	2–1	Lyon	Montbéliard
17:00 CET	Cissokho 10' (o.g.); Boudebouz 43' (pen.)	Report	Lacazette 14'	Stadium: Stade Auguste Bonal; Attendance: 15,638; Referee: Pascal Viléo (Aquitaine)

18 November 2011 14	Lyon	1–2	Rennes	Lyon
20:00 CET	Ederson 36'	Report	Pitroipa 39'; Kembo Ekoko 53'	Stadium: Stade de Gerland; Attendance: 32,193; Referee: Laurent Duhamel (Upper Normandy)

27 November 2011 15	Auxerre	0–3	Lyon	Auxerre
17:00 CET		Report	López 20', 68'; Bastos 88'	Stadium: Stade de l'Abbé-Deschamps; Attendance: 12,080; Referee: Hervé Piccirillo (Provence-Alpes-Côte d'Azur)

4 December 2011 16	Lyon	3–2	Toulouse	Lyon
21:00 CET	Koné 38'; Ederson 36'; López 66' (pen.)	Report	Bulut 68'; Sissoko 75' (pen.)	Stadium: Stade de Gerland; Attendance: 31,028; Referee: Saïd Ennjimi (Centre)

11 December 2011 17	Lorient	0–1	Lyon	Lorient
21:00 CET		Report	Lacazette 54'	Stadium: Stade du Moustoir; Attendance: 14,998; Referee: Philippe Kalt (Alsace)

17 December 2011 18	Lyon	2–1	Evian	Lyon
21:00 CET	Briand 35'; López 71'	Report	Sagbo 43'	Stadium: Stade de Gerland; Attendance: 35,253; Referee: Jean-Charles Cailleux (Picardy)

21 December 2011 19	Valenciennes	1–0	Lyon	Valenciennes
19:00 CET	Cissokho 28' (o.g.)	Report		Stadium: Stade du Hainaut; Attendance: 16,850; Referee: Philippe Malige (Languedoc-Roussillon)

14 January 2012 20	Montpellier	1–0	Lyon	Montpellier
21:00 CET	Giroud 62'	Report		Stadium: Stade de la Mosson; Attendance: 18,889; Referee: Stéphane Lannoy (Nord-Pas-de-Calais)

28 January 2012 21	Lyon	3–1	Dijon	Lyon
19:00 CET	Briand 8'; Gomis 82'; Lacazette 90'	Report	Sankharé 61'	Stadium: Stade de Gerland; Attendance: 35,644; Referee: Bartolomeu Varela (Brittany)

5 February 2012 22	Marseille	2–2	Lyon	Marseille
21:00 CET	Cheyrou 16'; Brandão 34'	Report	Gomis 36'; Diawara 45' (o.g.)	Stadium: Stade Vélodrome; Attendance: 41,474; Referee: Antony Gautier (Nord-Pas-de-Calais)

11 February 2012 23	Lyon	1–2	Caen	Lyon
15:00 CET	Hamouma 13'; Nabab 73'	Report	López 86' (pen.)	Stadium: Stade de Gerland; Attendance: 30,692; Referee: Pascal Viléo (Aquitaine)

19 February 2012 24	Bordeaux	1–0	Lyon	Bordeaux
17:00 CET	Gouffran 41'	Report		Stadium: Stade Chaban-Delmas; Attendance: 27,704; Referee: Hervé Piccirillo (Provence-Alpes-Côte d'Azur)

25 February 2012 25	Lyon	4–4	Paris Saint-Germain	Lyon
21:00 CET	Gomis 34'; López 36'; Bastos 40'; Briand 58'	Report	Hoarau 21', 90+4'; Nenê 45+2' (pen.); Ceará 73'	Stadium: Stade de Gerland; Attendance: 37,347; Referee: Fredy Fautrel (Lower Normandy)

3 March 2012 26	Nancy	2–0	Lyon	Tomblaine
19:00 CET	Puygrenier 66'; Bakar 72'	Report		Stadium: Stade Marcel Picot; Attendance: 17,049; Referee: Pascal Viléo (Aquitaine)

10 March 2012 27	Lyon	2–1	Lille	Lyon
21:00 CET	Lacazette 12'; López 38'	Report	Chedjou 45+1'	Stadium: Stade de Gerland; Attendance: 33,318; Referee: Saïd Ennjimi (Centre)

17 March 2012 28	Saint-Étienne	0–1	Lyon	Saint Étienne
21:00 CET		Report	Gomis 81'	Stadium: Stade Geoffroy-Guichard; Attendance: 26,210; Referee: Lionel Jaffredo (Brittany)

24 March 2012 29	Lyon	2–1	Sochaux	Lyon
19:00 CET	Lovren 4'; Gomis 65'	Report	Maïga 71'	Stadium: Stade de Gerland; Attendance: 32,730; Referee: Hervé Piccirillo (Provence-Alpes-Côte d'Azur)

1 April 2012 30	Rennes	1–1	Lyon	Rennes
21:00 CEST	Erdinç 5'	Report	López 75'	Stadium: Stade de la Route de Lorient; Attendance: 21,346; Referee: Philippe Malige (Languedoc-Roussillon)

7 April 2012 31	Lyon	2–1	Auxerre	Lyon
21:00 CEST	López 29' (pen.), 72' (pen.)	Report	Traoré 42'	Stadium: Stade de Gerland; Attendance: 31,492; Referee: Ruddy Buquet (Picardy)

18 April 2012 32	Toulouse	3–0	Lyon	Toulouse
18:30 CEST	Sirieix 9'; Rivière 22'; Bulut 90+1'	Report		Stadium: Stadium Municipal; Attendance: 21,325; Referee: Laurent Duhamel (Upper Normandy)

22 April 2012 33	Lyon	3–2	Lorient	Lyon
21:15 CEST	Cris 38'; López 77'; Gomis 85'	Report	Monnet-Paquet 42'; Autret 26'	Stadium: Stade de Gerland; Attendance: 30,330; Referee: Sébastien Moreira (Franche-Comté)

10 May 2012 34	Evian	1–3	Lyon	Annecy
21:00 CEST	Sagbo 15'	Report	Koné 23'; Briand 68'; Lacazette 90+1' (pen.)	Stadium: Parc des Sports, Annecy; Attendance: 14,973; Referee: Tony Chapron (Rhône-Alpes)

2 May 2012 35	Lyon	4–1	Valenciennes	Lyon
19:00 CEST	López 35', 72'; Cris 69'; Briand 88'	Report	Cohade 38' (pen.)	Stadium: Stade de Gerland; Attendance: 30,890; Referee: Nicolas Rainville (Languedoc-Roussillon)

6 May 2012 36	Lyon	1–1	Brest	Lyon
17:00 CEST	Gourcuff 37'	Report	Lorenzi 75'	Stadium: Stade de Gerland; Attendance: 31,016; Referee: Clément Turpin (Burgundy)

13 May 2012 37	Ajaccio	1–1	Lyon	Ajaccio
21:00 CEST	Eduardo 59' (pen.)	Report	Gomis 54'	Stadium: Stade François Coty; Attendance: 8,249; Referee: Stéphane Lannoy (Nord-Pas-de-Calais)

20 May 2012 38	Lyon	3–4	Nice	Lyon
21:00 CEST	López 21'; Briand 26', 69'	Report	Monzón 31'; Coulibaly 36'; Lloris 53' (o.g.); Gonçalves 73'	Stadium: Stade de Gerland; Attendance: 32,335; Referee: Olivier Thual (Aquitaine)

Last updated: 20 May 2012
Source: Ligue 1

=== Coupe de France ===
8 January 2012 Round of 64	Lyon Duchère	1–3	Lyon	Lyon
15:00 CET	Bouderbal 39'	Report	López 4', 30', 38'	Stadium: Stade de Gerland; Attendance: 12,300; Referee: Alexandre Castro (Rhône-Alpes)

22 January 2012 Round of 32	Luçon	0–2	Lyon	Nantes
16:00 CET		Report	Gomis 75'; López 90'	Stadium: Stade de la Beaujoire; Attendance: 15,000; Referee: Fredy Fautrel (Picardy)

8 February 2012 Round of 16	Lyon	3–1 (a.e.t.)	Bordeaux	Lyon
16:15 CET	Lacazette 37'; Gomis 96'; Briand 118'	Report	Jussiê 23'	Stadium: Stade de Gerland; Attendance: 7,000; Referee: Philippe Kalt (Alsace)

21 March 2012 Quarter final	Paris Saint-Germain	1–3	Lyon	Paris
20:50 CET	Nenê 19' (pen.)	Report	Källström 25'; López 39'; Gomis 90+2' (pen.)	Stadium: Parc des Princes; Attendance: 42,000; Referee: Clément Turpin (Burgundy)

10 April 2012 Semi final	Gazélec Ajaccio	0–4	Lyon	Ajaccio
20:45 CEST		Report	Lacazette 59'; López 73'; Grenier 80'; Gomis 90'	Stadium: Stade François Coty; Attendance: 10,163; Referee: Saïd Ennjimi (Centre)

28 April 2012 Final	Lyon	1–0	Quevilly	Saint-Denis
20:45 CEST	López 28'	Report		Stadium: Stade de France; Attendance: 76,229; Referee: Hervé Piccirillo (Île-de-France)

=== Coupe de la Ligue ===
26 October 2011 Round of 16	Saint-Étienne	1–2	Lyon	Saint-Étienne
19:50 CET	Aubameyang 88'	Report	Briand 40'; Bastos 72' (pen.)	Stadium: Stade Geoffroy-Guichard; Attendance: 25,906; Referee: Clément Turpin (Burgundy)

11 January 2012 Quarter final	Lyon	2–1	Lille	Lyon
20:50 CET	Källström 41'; López 65'	Report	Cole 28'	Stadium: Stade de Gerland; Attendance: 29,124; Referee: Laurent Duhamel (Upper Normandy)

31 January 2012 Semi final	Lorient	2–4 (a.e.t.)	Lyon	Lorient
20:45 CET	Emeghara 59'; Monnet-Paquet 68'	Report	Lacazette 80', 120+2'; Briand 90+4'; Gomis 102'	Stadium: Stade du Moustoir; Attendance: 14,610; Referee: Ruddy Buquet (Picardy)

14 April 2012 Final	Lyon	0–1 (a.e.t.)	Marseille	St. Denis
21:00 CEST		Report	Brandão 105'	Stadium: Stade de France; Attendance: 78,877; Referee: Stéphane Lannoy (Nord-Pas-de-Calais)

=== UEFA Champions League ===
==== Play-off round ====
16 August 2011 First leg	Lyon (France)	3–1	(Russia) Rubin Kazan	Lyon, France
20:45 CEST	Gomis 10'; Kvirkvelia 40' (o.g.); Briand 71'	Report	Dyadyun 3'	Stadium: Stade de Gerland; Attendance: 35,468; Referee: Gianluca Rocchi (Italy)

24 August 2011 Second leg	Rubin Kazan (Russia)	1–1 (2–4 agg.)	(France) Lyon	Kazan, Russia
18:00 CEST	Natcho 77'	Report	Koné 87'	Stadium: Central Stadium; Attendance: 19,000; Referee: Frank De Bleeckere (Belgium)

==== Group D ====
Pos	Team	Pld	W	D	L	GF	GA	GD	Pts	Qualification
1	(Spain) Real Madrid	6	6	0	0	19	2	+17	18	Advance to knockout phase
2	(France) Lyon	6	2	2	2	9	7	+2	8 (Note: Tied on head-to-head results. Overall goal difference was used as the tiebreaker.)	Advance to knockout phase
3	(Netherlands) Ajax	6	2	2	2	6	6	0	8	Transfer to Europa League
4	(Croatia) Dinamo Zagreb	6	0	0	6	3	22	−19	0	

Source: Soccerway
Notes:

14 September 2011 1	Ajax (Netherlands)	0–0	(France) Lyon	Amsterdam, Netherlands
20:45 CEST		Report		Stadium: Amsterdam Arena; Attendance: 49,504; Referee: Wolfgang Stark (Germany)

27 September 2011 2	Lyon (France)	2–0	(Croatia) Dinamo Zagreb	Lyon, France
20:45 CEST	Gomis 23'; Koné 42'	Report		Stadium: Stade de Gerland; Attendance: 34,432; Referee: Pavel Kralovec (Czech Republic)

18 October 2011 3	Real Madrid (Spain)	4–0	(France) Lyon	Madrid, Spain
20:45 CEST	Benzema 19'; Khedira 47'; Lloris 55' (o.g.); Ramos 81'	Report		Stadium: Santiago Bernabéu Stadium; Attendance: 70,028; Referee: Cüneyt Çakır (Turkey)

2 November 2011 4	Lyon (France)	0–2	(Spain) Real Madrid	Lyon, France
20:45 CET		Report	Ronaldo 24', 69' (pen.)	Stadium: Stade de Gerland; Attendance: 40,099; Referee: Nicola Rizzoli (Italy)

22 November 2011 5	Lyon (France)	0–0	(Netherlands) Ajax	Lyon, France
20:45 CET		Report		Stadium: Stade de Gerland; Attendance: 35,070; Referee: Jonas Eriksson (Sweden)

7 December 2011 6	Dinamo Zagreb (Croatia)	1–7	(France) Lyon	Zagreb, Croatia
20:45 CET	Kovačić 40'	Report	Gomis 45', 48', 52', 70'; Gonalons 47'; López 64'; Briand 75'	Stadium: Stadion Maksimir; Attendance: 16,457; Referee: Mark Clattenburg (England)

==== Knockout phase ====
===== Round of 16 =====
14 February 2012 First leg	Lyon (France)	1–0	(Cyprus) APOEL	Lyon, France
20:45 CET	Lacazette 58'	Report		Stadium: Stade de Gerland; Attendance: 32,010; Referee: Paolo Tagliavento (Italy)

7 March 2012 Second leg	APOEL (Cyprus)	1–0 (a.e.t.) (1–1 agg.) (4–3 p)	(France) Lyon	Nicosia, Cyprus
20:45 CET	Manduca 9'	Report		Stadium: GSP Stadium; Attendance: 22,701; Referee: Alberto Undiano Mallenco (Spain)
	Penalties
	Aílton (penalty scored); Morais (penalty scored); Alexandrou (penalty scored); Tričkovski (penalty scored)		(penalty scored) Källström; (penalty scored) Lisandro; (penalty scored) Gomis; (penalty missed) Lacazette; (penalty missed) Bastos

== Squad statistics ==
=== Appearances and goals ===
Last updated on 5 June 2012.

No.	Pos	Nat	Player	Total		Ligue 1		Champions League		Coupe de France		Coupe de la Ligue	
No.	Pos	Nat	Player	Apps	Goals	Apps	Goals	Apps	Goals	Apps	Goals	Apps	Goals
1	GK	(France) FRA	Hugo Lloris	54	0	36	0	10	0	5	0	3	0
3	DF	(Brazil) BRA	Cris	28	2	20	2	4	0	2	0	2	0
4	DF	(Burkina Faso) BFA	Bakary Koné	41	4	25+3	2	8+1	2	2+2	0	0	0
5	DF	(Croatia) CRO	Dejan Lovren	31	1	18	1	8	0	3	0	2	0
6	MF	(Sweden) SWE	Kim Källström	51	2	32	0	9	0	6	1	4	1
7	MF	(France) FRA	Clément Grenier	30	1	13+8	0	2	0	1+3	1	1+2	0
8	MF	(France) FRA	Yoann Gourcuff	23	2	10+3	2	4+1	0	2+1	0	1+1	0
9	FW	(Argentina) ARG	Lisandro López	43	25	24+4	16	5+1	1	6	7	3	1
10	MF	(Brazil) BRA	Ederson	25	2	5+10	2	3+3	0	1	0	1+2	0
11	MF	(Brazil) BRA	Michel Bastos	43	7	23+3	6	8	0	1+4	0	4	1
12	DF	(France) FRA	Timothée Kolodziejczak	1	0	1	0	0	0	0	0	0	0
13	DF	(France) FRA	Anthony Réveillère	49	0	33	0	9	0	5	0	2	0
14	DF	(France) FRA	Mouhamadou Dabo	26	0	11+4	0	2+1	0	3+2	0	3	0
15	MF	(France) FRA	Gueïda Fofana	25	0	10+8	0	2+1	0	3+1	0	0	0
17	FW	(France) FRA	Alexandre Lacazette	43	10	15+14	5	2+4	1	3+1	2	3+1	2
18	FW	(France) FRA	Bafétimbi Gomis	54	25	29+7	14	8+1	6	5+1	4	2+1	1
19	FW	(France) FRA	Jimmy Briand	56	14	30+7	9	9+1	2	3+2	1	2+2	2
20	DF	(France) FRA	Aly Cissokho	48	0	30+1	0	9	0	4	0	3+1	0
21	MF	(France) FRA	Maxime Gonalons	52	2	34+1	1	8	1	5	0	4	0
22	MF	(Mali) MLI	Sidy Koné	2	0	1+1	0	0	0	0	0	0	0
23	DF	(France) FRA	Samuel Umtiti	18	0	11+1	0	0	0	3	0	3	0
24	MF	(France) FRA	Jérémy Pied	19	1	2+12	1	0+3	0	2	0	0	0
25	FW	(France) FRA	Yassine Benzia	1	0	0+1	0	0	0	0	0	0	0
26	DF	(Ghana) GHA	John Mensah	1	0	1	0	0	0	0	0	0	0
27	FW	(France) FRA	Yannis Tafer	0	0	0	0	0	0	0	0	0	0
28	GK	(France) FRA	Mathieu Valverde	1	0	0	0	0	0	1	0	0	0
30	GK	(France) FRA	Rémy Vercoutre	4	0	2+1	0	0	0	0	0	1	0
36	DF	(France) FRA	Sébastien Faure	0	0	0	0	0	0	0	0	0	0
37	DF	(France) FRA	Thomas Fontaine	0	0	0	0	0	0	0	0	0	0
Players sold/loaned after the start of the season:
8	MF	(Bosnia and Herzegovina) BIH	Miralem Pjanić	5	1	1+2	1	0+2	0	0	0	0	0
15	FW	(France) FRA	Harry Novillo	1	0	0+1	0	0	0	0	0	0	0
39	FW	(France) FRA	Ishak Belfodil	9	0	1+6	0	0+2	0	0	0	0	0
