= 2012 Coupe de la Ligue final =

- Event: 2011–12 Coupe de la Ligue
Lyon	Marseille
Ligue 1	Ligue 1
0	1
- After extra time
- Date: 14 April 2012
- Venue: Stade de France, Saint-Denis
- Man of the Match: Nicolas N'Koulou
- Referee: Stéphane Lannoy (Nord-Pas-de-Calais)
- Attendance: 80,000
- Weather: 9 °C (48 °F), Partly Cloudy

The 2012 Coupe de la Ligue final was the 18th final of France's football league cup competition, the Coupe de la Ligue, a football competition for the 42 teams that the Ligue de Football Professionnel (LFP) manages. The final took place on 14 April 2012 at the Stade de France in Saint-Denis and was contested between Lyon and Marseille. The latter club entered the match as the two-time defending champions of the competition and sought to become the first club in French football history to win the competition three consecutive years after previously becoming the first club to win the competition in back-to-back seasons. Lyon made its first finals appearance since the 2008 Coupe de France final and played at the Stade de France for the first time in nearly three years. The final was broadcast live on public network broadcaster France Télévisions.

Marseille captured its third straight league cup title after defeating Lyon 1–0 after an extra time goal from Brandão. The Man of the Match award was given to Cameroonian international Nicolas N'Koulou. Marseille secured a UEFA Europa League place for the 2012–13 season.

== News ==
=== Team backgrounds ===
Lyon appeared in its fourth final of the Coupe de la Ligue. The Rhône-Alpes-based club won its only league cup title in 2001 defeating Monaco 2–1 after extra time. In Lyon's other two finals appearances, the club finished runner-up to Metz and Bordeaux in 1996 and 2007, respectively. Lyon made its first finals appearance since the 2008 Coupe de France Final when the club beat Paris Saint-Germain 1–0. The club also played at the Stade de France for the first time in nearly three years. The last time Lyon played at the country's national stadium was in a domestic league match against Lille. Lyon lost the match 2–0.

Marseille made its third appearance in the final of the Coupe de la Ligue. The club was the competition's defending champions having defeated Montpellier 1–0 in last year's final. As a result, Marseille became the first club in the French football history to win the competition in consecutive seasons; the club defeated Bordeaux 3–1 in 2010. Les Phocéens attempted to become the first club to win the Coupe de la Ligue in three consecutive years.

=== Ticketing ===
The Coupe de la Ligue final has been played every year at the Stade de France since 1998, following the stadium's completion. The stadium has a capacity of 81,338 spectators. Each club that will participate in the final will receive the same quota of tickets, which are distributed to season ticket holders and through each club's ticket sales at a later date. Tickets went on sale to the general public on 28 March 2012, three weeks before the final, and were immediately sold out.

=== Officials ===
On 5 April, the LFP announced that the Direction Nationale de l’Arbitrage (DNA) (English: National Directorate of Arbitration) had confirmed referee Stéphane Lannoy of Nord-Pas-de-Calais would officiate the 2012 Coupe de la Ligue final. Lannoy, a Fédéral F1 referee, the highest designation given to a referee in France, has officiated matches at the 2008 Summer Olympics, in the UEFA Champions League, UEFA Cup and qualifiers for the UEFA Euro 2008, UEFA Euro 2012, and 2010 FIFA World Cup. He has presided over five matches involving either of the two teams this season; three matches for Lyon and two for Marseille. Lyon lost two of the three matches, while Marseille won both of its ties that Lannoy officiated. Lannoy refereed his second league cup final, his first being in 2010, and was assisted by Eric Dansault of Centre and Frédéric Cano of Centre-Ouest. Lionel Jaffredo of Brittany will serve as the fourth official.

=== Time change ===
On 30 March 2012, the Ligue de Football Professionnel confirmed that the kick-off of the 2012 Coupe de la Ligue final would be moved from its originally scheduled time of 20:45 to 21:00. The decision was made by the LFP as a result of television channel France 2's, which aired the final, obligations towards the upcoming 2012 French presidential election.

== Route to the final ==
Note: In all results below, the score of the finalist is given first (H: home; A: away).

Lyon		Round	Marseille	
Opponent	Result	2011–12 Coupe de la Ligue	Opponent	Result
Saint-Étienne (A)	2–1	Round of 16	Lens (H)	4–0
Lille (H)	2–1	Quarter-finals	Caen (A)	3–0
Lorient (A)	4–2 (a.e.t.)	Semi-finals	Nice (H)	2–1

== Match ==
=== Pre-match ===
The opening kick-off was done by former players Sonny Anderson and Abedi Pele. Both players have starred for Lyon and Marseille during their careers, however, each is known primarily for their stints with each club; Anderson with Lyon and Pele with Marseille. With Les Gones, Anderson won two league titles in 2001 and 2002 and also captured the 2000–01 Coupe de la Ligue title. Pele is a member of the FIFA 100 and won two league titles in the early 90s with Marseille. In 1993, he helped the club win the UEFA Champions League. In his five-year stint with Marseille, Pele won the African Footballer of the Year award three times.

=== Details ===
14 April 2012
21:00 CEST

Lyon	0–1	Marseille
	Report	Brandão 105'

Stade de France, Saint-Denis
Attendance: 80,000
Referee: Stéphane Lannoy (Nord-Pas-de-Calais)

Lyon	Marseille

LYON:
GK	1	(France) Hugo Lloris
RB	13	(France) Anthony Réveillère
CB	5	(Croatia) Dejan Lovren	(yellow card) 55' (yellow-red card) 120'
CB	23	(France) Samuel Umtiti
LB	14	(France) Mouhamadou Dabo		(substituted off) 118'
CM	21	(France) Maxime Gonalons
CM	6	(Sweden) Kim Källström		(substituted off) 106'
LW	11	(Brazil) Michel Bastos		(substituted off) 65'
RW	19	(France) Jimmy Briand	(yellow card) 25'
FW	9	(Argentina) Lisandro López (c)
FW	18	(France) Bafétimbi Gomis	(yellow card) 92'
Substitutes:
GK	30	(France) Rémy Vercoutre
DF	3	(Brazil) Cris
DF	4	(Burkina Faso) Bakary Koné
DF	20	(France) Aly Cissokho		(substituted on) 118'
MF	7	(France) Clément Grenier		(substituted on) 65'
MF	15	(France) Gueïda Fofana
FW	17	(France) Alexandre Lacazette	(yellow card) 120'	(substituted on) 106'
Manager:
(France) Rémi Garde

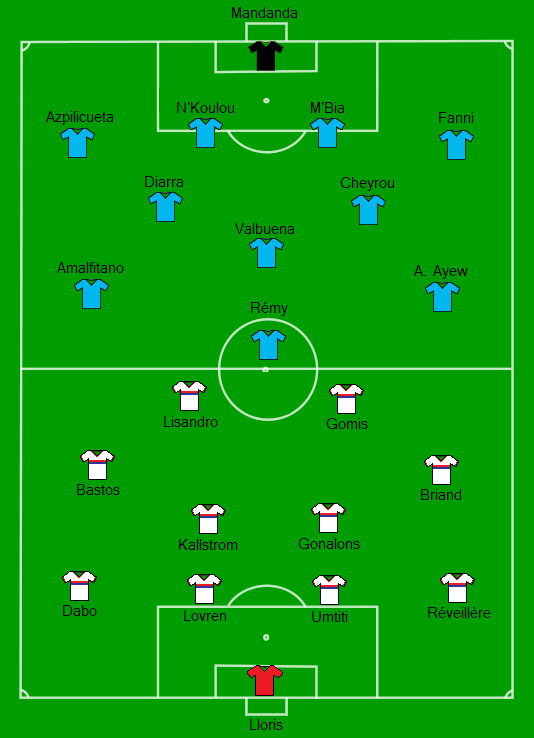

MARSEILLE:
GK	30	(France) Steve Mandanda (c)
RB	2	(Spain) César Azpilicueta
CB	24	(France) Rod Fanni
CB	17	(Cameroon) Stéphane Mbia	(yellow card) 50'
LB	3	(Cameroon) Nicolas N'Koulou	(yellow card) 120'
DM	4	(France) Alou Diarra	(yellow card) 15'	(substituted off) 82'
CM	7	(France) Benoît Cheyrou
CM	18	(France) Morgan Amalfitano
RW	28	(France) Mathieu Valbuena		(substituted off) 118'
LW	20	(Ghana) André Ayew
FW	11	(France) Loïc Rémy	(yellow card) 93'	(substituted off) 98'
Substitutes:
GK	1	(France) Gennaro Bracigliano
DF	13	(Mali) Djimi Traoré
DF	15	(France) Jérémy Morel		(substituted on) 118'
MF	12	(Burkina Faso) Charles Kaboré		(substituted on) 82'
FW	9	(Brazil) Brandão		(substituted on) 98'
FW	10	(France) André-Pierre Gignac
FW	23	(Ghana) Jordan Ayew
Manager:
(France) Didier Deschamps

MATCH OFFICIALS

- Assistant referees:
  - Eric Dansault (Centre)
  - Frédéric Cano (Centre-Ouest)
- Fourth official: Lionel Jaffredo (Brittany)
- Chief Delegate: Jacques Fioré
- Assistant delegates:
  - Georges Ceccaldi
  - Jean-Claude Désiré

MAN OF THE MATCH

- Nicolas N'Koulou

MATCH RULES

- 90 minutes.
- 30 minutes of extra-time if necessary.
- Penalty shoot-out if scores still level.
- Seven named substitutes.
- Maximum of three substitutions.

== See also ==
- Choc des Olympiques
- 2012 Coupe de France final
- 2011–12 Olympique Lyonnais season
- 2011–12 Olympique de Marseille season
