= 2012 Coupe de France final =

Final of the 2011–12 edition of the Coupe de France

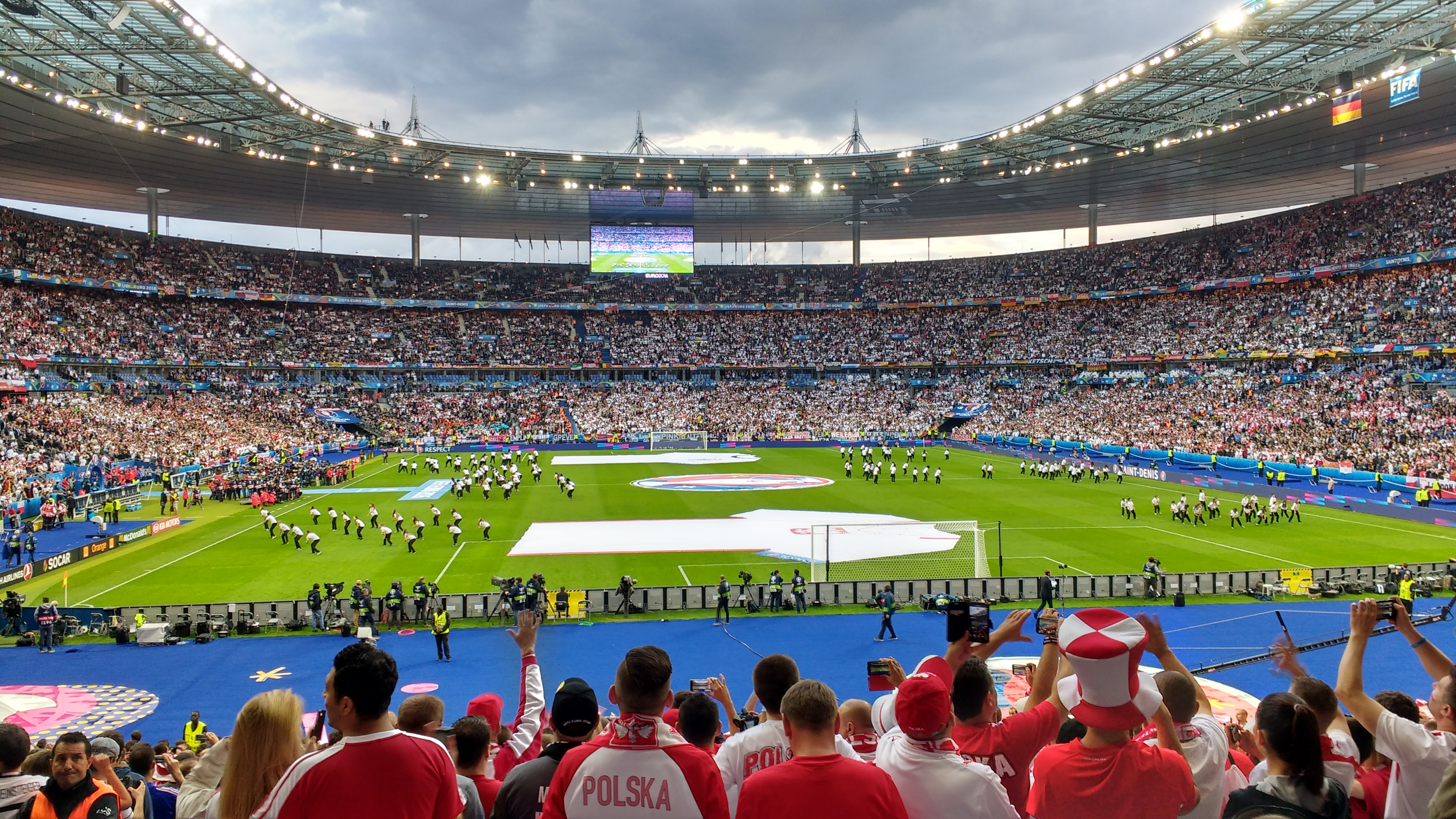
- Event: 2011–12 Coupe de France
Lyon	Quevilly
Ligue 1	National
1	0
- Date: 28 April 2012
- Venue: Stade de France, Saint-Denis
- Man of the Match: Lisandro López
- Referee: Hervé Piccirillo (Île-de-France)
- Attendance: 76,229
- Weather: 21 °C (70 °F), Cloudy

The 2012 Coupe de France final was the 94th final of France's most prestigious football cup competition. The final took place on 28 April 2012 at the Stade de France in Saint-Denis and was contested between Lyon and Quevilly. The winner of the Coupe de France is guaranteed a place in the group stage of the UEFA Europa League with the club's appearance being dependent on whether it qualifies for the 2012–13 UEFA Champions League. The final was broadcast live on France 2.

First division club Lyon defeated semi-professional third-tier Quevilly 1–0 in the final courtesy of a first half goal from Lisandro López to win its fifth Coupe de France title. The title is the club's first domestically since winning the same competition in 2008. The runners-up, Quevilly, alongside fellow National club Gazélec Ajaccio, were awarded the Petit Poucet Plaque, an award given to the best performing non-professional club in the Coupe de France.

== News ==
=== Team backgrounds ===
Lyon appeared in its eighth Coupe de France final match. In the club's previous seven final matches, it won four of them, most recently in 2008 when Lyon defeated Paris Saint-Germain 1–0 courtesy of an extra time goal from Sidney Govou. The 2008 domestic cup title was Lyon's last trophy the club won during the Jean-Michel Aulas reign. Prior to 2008, Lyon last reached a Coupe de France final in 1976 when the club suffered a 3–0 defeat to Marseille. The Rhône-Alpes-based club made its second appearance at the Stade de France in two weeks having played at the country's national stadium on 14 April in the 2012 Coupe de la Ligue Final.

Quevilly, a semi-professional club, made its second appearance in the final of the Coupe de France. The club's only other appearance came over 85 years ago when the club was defeated 3–0 by Marseille at the Stade Olympique Yves-du-Manoir in 1927. The competition was only in its tenth season at the time and it was also the first time in the competition's history that the President of France handed the trophy to the winning team's captain. Included in that Quevilly team was former French international Philippe Bonnardel. The 85-year gap between finals appearances is the longest in competition history. Other notable appearances in the competition occurred during the 1967–68 season and more recently, the 2009–10 season, when Quevilly reached the semi-finals. Quevilly's performance in 1968 was the best performance by an amateur club in the competition prior to Calais reaching the final in 2000.

Quevilly and Lyon have met only once, coincidentally, during the 1967–68 Coupe de France when Quevilly reached the semi-finals. The two clubs met on 10 March 1968 in the fourth round of the competition. Quevilly won the match 1–0 with a goal from Daniel Horlaville. Quevilly was the third club from the Championnat National to appear in the final of the Coupe de France and attempted to become the lowest-rated club in the competition's history to lift the trophy. Lyon became only the third team in French football history to reach both the Coupe de la Ligue and Coupe de France finals in the same season. Paris Saint-Germain, who have accomplished the feat three times, and Lorient were the other clubs.

=== Ticketing ===
The Coupe de France final has been played every year at the Stade de France since 1998, following the stadium's completion. The stadium has a capacity of 81,338 spectators. Each club that participates in the final received the same quota of tickets. The tickets were distributed to the public via each club, as well as the each club's league association. Lyon began selling its tickets on 14 April at the club's store at the Stade de Gerland and on its official website, while Quevilly distributed its tickets on 20 April at the Stade Lozai, the club's home stadium.

=== Officials ===
On 5 April, the LFP announced that the Direction Nationale de l’Arbitrage (DNA) (English: National Directorate of Arbitration) had confirmed referee Hervé Piccirillo of Île-de-France would officiate the 2012 Coupe de France final. Piccirillo, a Fédéral F1 referee, the highest designation given to a referee in France, has officiated matches in the UEFA Champions League, UEFA Europa League, international friendlies, and qualifiers for the 2010 FIFA World Cup. He presided over five matches involving either of the two teams this season; four matches for Lyon and one for Quevilly. Lyon won two of the four matches, drew one, and were defeated in the other. On 21 January 2012, Piccirillo presided over Quevilly's 1–0 win over Angers in the Round of 32 of this year's Coupe de France. He was assisted by Fredjy Harchay and David Benech, both of Île-de-France. Bartolomeu Varela of Brittany served as the fourth official.

== Road to the final ==
Lyon			Round	Quevilly
Opponent	H/A	Result	2011–12 Coupe de France	Opponent	H/A	Result
Bye	—	—	Fifth Round	Évreux	A	4–1
Bye	—	—	Sixth Round	Pacy Vallée-d'Eure	A	3–1
Bye	—	—	Seventh Round	Racing Clermont	A	5–2
Bye	—	—	Eighth Round	Feignies	A	1–1 (a.e.t.); 3−0 pen.
Lyon Duchère	A	3–1	Round of 64	Tour d'Auvergne Rennes	A	0–0 (a.e.t.); 5−4 pen.
Vendée Luçon	A	2–0	Round of 32	Angers	H	1–0
Bordeaux	H	3–1 (a.e.t.)	Round of 16	Orléans	H	2–0 (a.e.t.)
Paris SG	A	3–1	Quarter-finals	Marseille	H	3–2 (a.e.t.)
Gazélec Ajaccio	A	4–0	Semi-finals	Rennes	H	2–1

== Match ==
=== Match details ===
28 April 2012
20:45 CEST

Lyon	1–0	Quevilly
López 28'	Report

Stade de France, Saint-Denis
Attendance: 76,229
Referee: Hervé Piccirillo (Île-de-France)

Lyon	Quevilly

LYON:
GK	1	(France) Hugo Lloris
RB	13	(France) Anthony Réveillère
CB	3	(Brazil) Cris (c)
CB	5	(Croatia) Dejan Lovren		(substituted off) 18'
LB	20	(France) Aly Cissokho
CM	6	(Sweden) Kim Källström	(yellow card) 75'
CM	8	(France) Yoann Gourcuff		(substituted off) 67'
CM	21	(France) Maxime Gonalons
LW	9	(Argentina) Lisandro López
RW	17	(France) Alexandre Lacazette
FW	18	(France) Bafétimbi Gomis		(substituted off) 81'
Substitutes:
GK	30	(France) Rémy Vercoutre
DF	4	(Burkina Faso) Bakary Koné		(substituted on) 18'
DF	14	(France) Mouhamadou Dabo
MF	7	(France) Clément Grenier	(yellow card) 80'	(substituted on) 67'
MF	15	(France) Gueïda Fofana
MF	24	(France) Jérémy Pied
FW	19	(France) Jimmy Briand		(substituted on) 81'
Manager:
(France) Rémi Garde

QUEVILLY:
GK	1	(Morocco) Yassine El Kharroubi
RB	2	(France) Alexandre Vardin
CB	28	(France) Frédéric Weis
CB	5	(France) Grégory Beaugrard (c)
LB	20	(France) Cédric Vanoukia
CM	3	(France) Zanké Diarra		(substituted off) 77'
CM	7	(France) Matthias Jouan
RW	22	(France) Anthony Laup		(substituted off) 81'
LW	11	(France) Pierrick Capelle
FW	19	(France) Julien Valéro		(substituted off) 57'
FW	29	(France) Joris Colinet	(yellow card) 78'
Substitutes:
GK	16	(France) Issa Coulibaly
DF	6	(France) Lionel Mallein
DF	14	(France) Kévin Giboyau
MF	8	(France) Florian Fédèle
FW	9	(France) Karim Herouat		(substituted on) 57'
FW	10	(France) Abdel Majide Ouahbi		(substituted on) 77'
FW	21	(France) John-Christophe Ayina		(substituted on) 81'
Manager:
(France) Régis Brouard

MATCH OFFICIALS

- Assistant referees:
  - Fredjy Harchay (Île-de-France)
  - David Benech (Île-de-France)
- Fourth official: Lionel Jaffredo (Brittany)
- Chief Delegate: Christian Sercomanens
- Assistant delegates:
  - Edmond Michalski
  - Jean-Jacques Gazeau

MAN OF THE MATCH

- Lisandro López

MATCH RULES

- 90 minutes.
- 30 minutes of extra-time if necessary.
- Penalty shoot-out if scores still level.
- Seven named substitutes.
- Maximum of three substitutions.

== See also ==
- 2011–12 Coupe de France
