= Alexandre Vardin =

French footballer (born 1989)

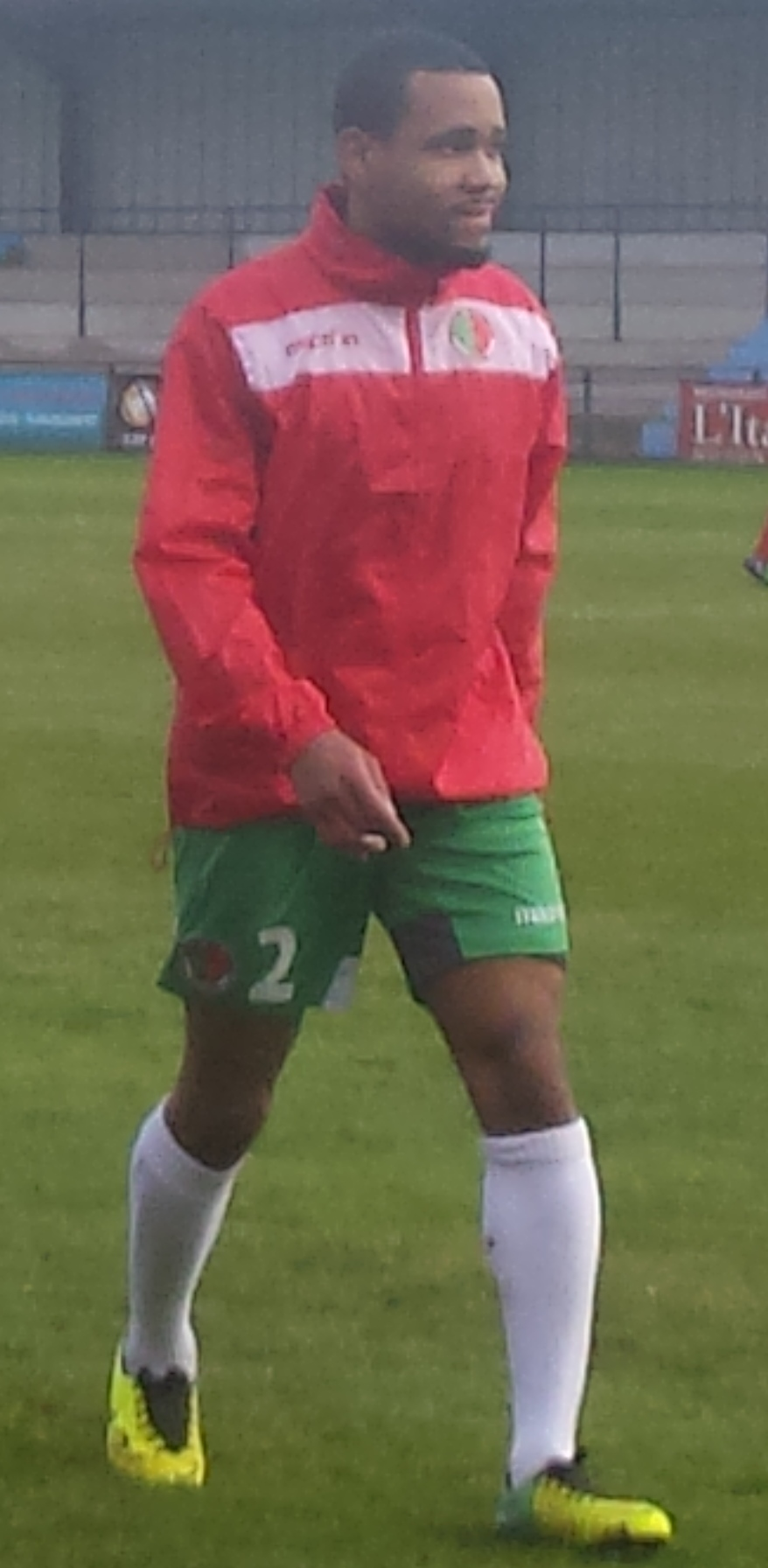
- Vardin with Sedan in 2015

Personal information
- Date of birth: 18 September 1989 (age 37)
- Place of birth: Guadeloupe
- Height: 1.82 m (6 ft 0 in)
- Position: Full back

Team information
- Current team: Sablé

Youth career
- 2005–2008: Caen

Senior career*
Years	Team	Apps	(Gls)
2008–2011	Caen B	75	(1)
2011–2012	Quevilly	31	(1)
2012–2013	Boulogne	27	(0)
2013–2016	Sedan	78	(3)
2016–2022	Le Mans	118	(2)
2022–	Sablé	0	(0)
- * Club domestic league appearances and goals as of 13 May 2022

Alexandre Vardin (born 18 September 1989) is a French footballer who plays as a full back for Sablé.

== Life and career ==
Vardin began his football career at the age of 15 with Caen, courtesy of a youth development partnership in his native Guadeloupe. He went on play regularly for the club's B team. After six years at the club, he moved on to Quevilly, and was a member of their team that eliminated Olympique Marseille and Rennes from the 2011–12 Coupe de France to reach the final, in which they lost 1–0 to Lyon. He spent the 2012–13 season with another third-tier club, Boulogne, and then joined Sedan, newly demoted to the fifth-tier Championnat de France Amateur 2. He won two consecutive promotions with Sedan and played for them in the third tier before moving on in 2016 to Le Mans, where he went one better, winning three consecutive promotions, from fifth tier to second.

He was included in France under-20's 28-man training camp ahead of the 2009 Jeux de la Francophonie, but did not make the cut.

== Honours ==
US Quevilly

- Coupe de France runners-up: 2011–12
