= Lisandro López (footballer, born 1983) =

Argentine footballer

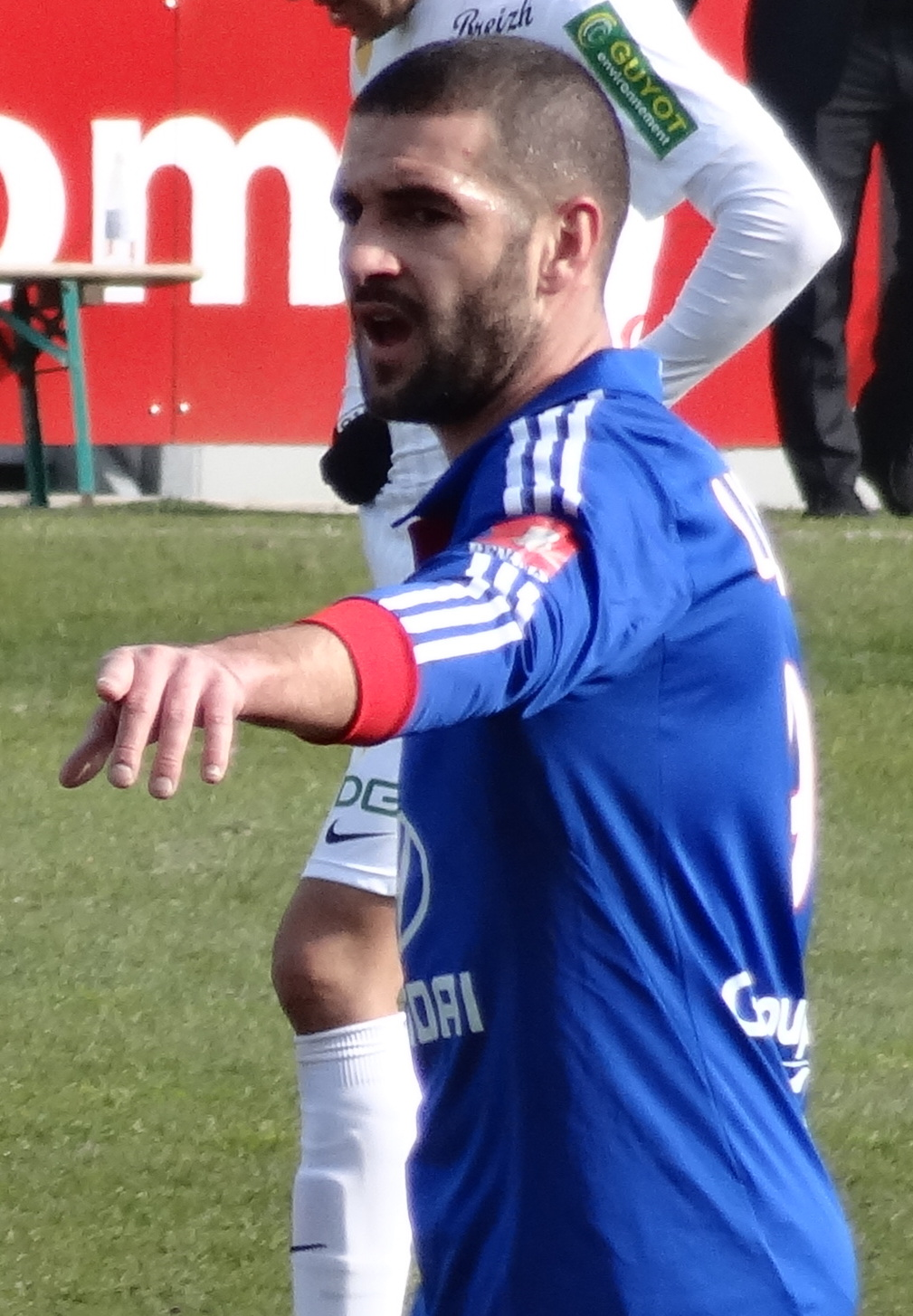
- López with Lyon in 2013

Personal information
- Date of birth: 2 March 1983 (age 43)
- Place of birth: Rafael Obligado, Argentina
- Height: 1.74 m (5 ft 9 in)
- Positions: Striker; winger

Youth career
- 2001–2003: Racing Club

Senior career*
Years	Team	Apps	(Gls)
2003–2005	Racing Club	71	(26)
2005–2009	Porto	106	(48)
2009–2013	Lyon	119	(59)
2013–2015	Al-Gharafa	40	(13)
2015	Internacional	24	(4)
2016–2021	Racing Club	101	(40)
2021	Atlanta United	2	(0)
2021	Racing Club	18	(3)
2022–2024	Sarmiento	91	(13)
Total		572	(206)

International career
2005–2009	Argentina	7	(1)
- * Club domestic league appearances and goals

Lisandro López (born 2 March 1983) is an Argentine former professional footballer. Primarily a striker, he was also capable of playing on the wings.

After starting out at Racing Club in 2003, he spent four years each with Porto in Portugal and Lyon in France, winning eight major titles between the two teams. He also played in Qatar, Brazil and the United States, before returning to Argentina where he retired at Sarmiento in 2024.

López earned seven caps for the Argentina national team in four years, having made his debut in 2005.

== Club career ==
=== Racing Club ===
López was born in the small town of Rafael Obligado, in Buenos Aires Province's vast agricultural interior region. He arrived at Racing Club at the age of 18 and, just two years later, made his Argentine Primera División debut in the 2003 Clausura; also in the side was a young Diego Milito leading the attack, and his subsequent exit to Genoa opened the doors to a regular first-team spot which López made his own in 2004.

López was crowned top scorer in the 2004 Apertura tournament, going on to score 26 goals in 71 league appearances and over 30 in all competitions. During his spell at El Cilindro, he was nicknamed Licha.

=== Porto ===
In April 2005, López signed for Porto for a transfer fee of €2.3 million, at the same time of compatriot Lucho González. His agents, Global Soccer Agencies (later renamed Rio Football Services), retained 50% of the player's rights; in the same transfer window, Luís Fabiano, whose rights were owned by GSA's sister company, "Global Soccer Investments" (75%), left. He scored seven Primeira Liga goals in his first season in 26 games, repeating the feat the following campaign while appearing in one match less. He also found the net in the 1–1 home draw against Rangers in the 2005–06 UEFA Champions League, adding two to help defeat Hamburger SV (also in that competition but in the next edition, 4–1 home win).

In 2007–08, as the side were crowned league champions for the third consecutive time, López was the competition's top scorer, scoring 24 goals in 27 games and adding three in the season's Champions League. On 20 April 2008, he netted twice – also being booked – in a 2–0 home win against Benfica. An offer from Zenit Saint Petersburg was rejected midway through the campaign, and the Portuguese club eventually bought the remaining economic rights of the player for €4.4 million.

López scored just ten goals in 2008–09, but finished fourth in the individual department in the Champions League with six, only trailing Lionel Messi, Steven Gerrard and Miroslav Klose. Porto wrapped up the season with the conquest of the Taça de Portugal, and he netted the game's only goal in a victory over Paços de Ferreira.

=== Lyon ===
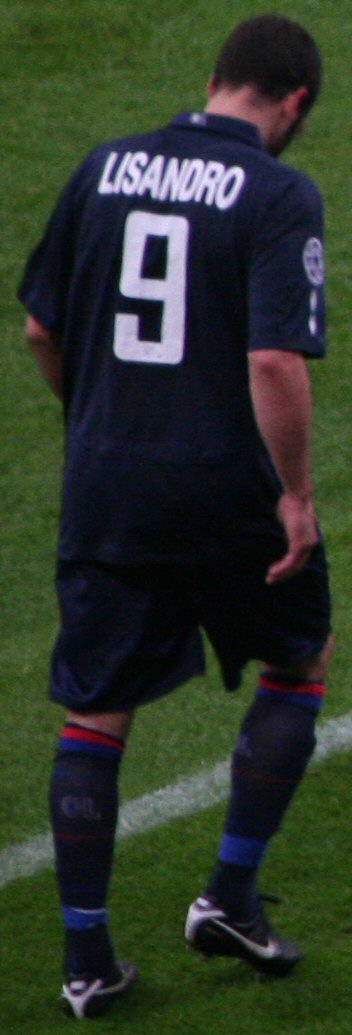
López during a Champions League match for Lyon in April 2010

After the sale of Karim Benzema to Real Madrid in the summer of 2009, López replaced him at Lyon, being transferred for a fee of €24 million, plus a €4 million bonus subject to performances. On 8 August, he scored on his Ligue 1 debut from a last-minute free kick at Le Mans, in a 2–2 draw. He added a hat-trick against Anderlecht in the second leg of the Champions League qualifying round, in a 8–2 aggregate win.

On 4 November 2009, López scored a late equaliser in a group game against Liverpool to ensure qualification for the knockout stage. Four days later, he netted twice in three minutes in a 5–5 league draw with Marseille, adding a further three goals the following month at Lille; the visitors led 3–1 at half-time, but were eventually defeated 4–3.

On 30 March 2010, López scored twice in the 3–1 home victory over Bordeaux in the Champions League quarter-finals (3–2 aggregate win). He missed the second leg due to suspension.

López assisted Miralem Pjanić in a 2–0 home defeat of Le Mans on the final day of the season, a result that placed his team second in the league table with the subsequent direct Champions League qualification. On 9 May 2010, he was named Ligue 1 Footballer of the Year.

On 17 October 2010, López scored twice – once from a penalty kick – in the 3–1 win over Lille at the Stade de Gerland. He found the net again three days later, against Benfica in a 2–0 Champions League group stage win.

López grabbed a brace in the 2–1 victory at Montpellier on 4 December 2010, the second goal coming in the fifth minute of stoppage time. Three days later, Lyon, needing a point to advance to the knockout phase of the Champions League, played host to Hapoel Tel Aviv, and he opened an eventual 2–2 home draw in the 62nd minute.

On 6 March 2011, after six scoreless appearances, López scored a hat-trick in the 5–0 thrashing of Arles-Avignon. He continued his run in the next round, opening the 2–0 away win over Sochaux. On the last round of the campaign, he netted in the 2–0 win for the third-placed side against Monaco to condemn the opposition to their first relegation in 35 years.

López started 2011–12 in fine form, scoring in the first two games, his first coming in the early stages of a 3–1 away win over Nice. The following weekend, against newly promoted Ajaccio, he hit the post twice in the first ten minutes and had several shots saved by Guillermo Ochoa, but was able to salvage a point for new coach Rémi Garde on his home debut with a header in the 83rd minute.

On 8 January 2012, López scored three times in a 3–1 victory at Lyon-Duchère in the Coupe de France. Three days later, he netted the 2–1 winner against Lille in the Coupe de la Ligue, in the 64th minute. On the 22nd, in his 100th competitive match for Lyon, he scored against Luçon in the French Cup round of 32.

On 28 April 2012, López helped grab victory in the French Cup final, scoring the game's only goal against Quevilly. In late April 2013, he announced he was leaving the club in the summer transfer window, with Garde commenting:

I also wanted to make a huge tribute to Licha (López). I will not forget what he did.

=== Al-Gharafa and Internacional ===
On 8 August 2013, López signed for Qatari club Al-Gharafa for a fee of €7.2 million. He changed countries again in late February 2015, joining Brazil's Internacional on a two-year deal.

=== Later career ===
On 1 January 2016, two months shy of his 33rd birthday, López returned to Racing Club on a free transfer which had been agreed the previous month. In the 2018–19 season, he scored 17 league goals to lead the individual charts and help his team win the national championship for the 18th time in their history.

On 25 January 2021, López joined Major League Soccer club Atlanta United. After four appearances in league and continental competitions, he terminated his contract by mutual consent following the death of his father.

López returned to Racing for a third stint on 22 June 2021, signing a one-year deal with the option of ending it after six months. On 29 November, the 38-year-old announced that he would retire after the match against Godoy Cruz the following month. One month later, however, he went back on his word and agreed to a one-year contract with Sarmiento.

López scored on his debut on 10 February 2022, in a 1–0 home victory over Atlético Tucumán in the group stage of the Copa de la Liga Profesional. He retired for a second and final time in December 2024.

== International career ==
In 2005, López was called up to the Argentina national team by José Pékerman, and he made his debut against Mexico on 10 March in a 1–1 friendly draw. After solid Porto performances, he was summoned three years later by Alfio Basile for exhibition games with Egypt, Mexico, the United States and Belarus.

On 12 August 2009, López scored one goal in Argentina's 3–2 victory over Russia at the Lokomotiv Stadium in Moscow. Nine days later, he was called by national team boss Diego Maradona for the decisive matches against Brazil and Paraguay for the 2010 FIFA World Cup qualification, but was overlooked for the final stages in South Africa.

== Personal life ==
López is of Chilean descent through his mother.

== Career statistics ==
=== Club ===
Appearances and goals by club, season and competition
Club	Season	League			National cup (Note: Includes Copa Argentina, Taça de Portugal, Coupe de France, Qatari Stars Cup, Copa do Brasil, Copa Argentina)		League cup (Note: Includes Taça da Liga, Coupe de la Ligue, Copa de la Superliga)		Continental		Other		Total	
Club	Season	Division	Apps	Goals	Apps	Goals	Apps	Goals	Apps	Goals	Apps	Goals	Apps	Goals
Racing Club	2002–03	Primera División	3	0			—		—		—		3	0
Racing Club	2003–04	Primera División	31	8			—		—		—		31	8
Racing Club	2004–05	Primera División	37	18			—		—		—		37	18
Racing Club	Total		71	26			—		—		—		71	26
Porto	2005–06	Primeira Liga	26	7	1	0	—		2 (Note: Appearances in UEFA Champions League)	1	—		29	8
Porto	2006–07	Primeira Liga	25	7	0	0	—		8	3	1 (Note: Appearance in Supertaça Cândido de Oliveira)	0	34	10
Porto	2007–08	Primeira Liga	27	24	4	0	0	0	8	3	0	0	39	27
Porto	2008–09	Primeira Liga	28	10	4	1	0	0	10	6	1	0	43	17
Porto	Total		106	48	9	1	0	0	28	13	2	0	145	62
Lyon	2009–10	Ligue 1	33	15	2	0	2	2	12	7	—		49	24
Lyon	2010–11	Ligue 1	27	17	2	0	1	0	5	2	—		35	19
Lyon	2011–12	Ligue 1	28	16	6	7	3	1	6	1	—		43	25
Lyon	2012–13	Ligue 1	31	11	1	1	1	0	6 (Note: Appearances in UEFA Europa League)	2	0	0	39	14
Lyon	2013–14	Ligue 1	0	0	0	0	0	0	2	0	—		2	0
Lyon	Total		119	59	11	8	7	3	31	12	0	0	168	82
Al-Gharafa	2013–14	Qatar Stars League	23	9	3	1	5	2	—		—		31	12
Al-Gharafa	2014–15	Qatar Stars League	17	4	0	0	0	0	—		—		17	4
Al-Gharafa	Total		40	13	3	1	5	2	—		—		48	16
Internacional	2015	Série A	24	4	2	1	—		6 (Note: Appearances in Copa Libertadores)	3	7 (Note: Appearances in Campeonato Gaúcho)	2	39	10
Racing Club	2016	Primera División	12	4	3	2	1	0	9	4	—		25	10
Racing Club	2016–17	Primera División	19	7	2	1	3	0	6 (Note: Appearances in Copa Sudamericana)	0	—		30	8
Racing Club	2017–18	Primera División	20	7	0	0	1	0	8	1	—		29	8
Racing Club	2018–19	Primera División	24	17	1	0	2	1	0	0	—		27	18
Racing Club	2019–20	Primera División	20	4	0	0	0	0	8	0	—		28	4
Racing Club	2020–21	Primera División	6	1	0	0	0	0	0	0	—		6	1
Racing Club	Total		101	40	6	3	7	1	31	5	—		145	49
Atlanta United	2021	Major League Soccer	2	0	—		—		2 (Note: Appearances in CONCACAF Champions League)	0	—		4	0
Racing Club	2021	Primera División	18	3	1	1	0	0	—		—		19	4
Sarmiento	2022	Primera División	34	7	1	0	—		—		—		35	7
Sarmiento	2023	Primera División	26	3	1	0	—		—		—		27	3
Sarmiento	2024	Primera División	31	3	1	0	—		—		—		32	3
Career total			572	206	35	15	19	6	98	33	9	2	733	262

=== International ===
Scores and results list Argentina's goal tally first, score column indicates score after each López goal.

List of international goals scored by Lisandro López
No.	Date	Venue	Opponent	Score	Result	Competition
1	12 August 2009	Lokomotiv Stadium, Moscow, Russia	Russia	2–1	3–2	Friendly

== Honours ==
Porto

- Primeira Liga: 2005–06, 2006–07, 2007–08, 2008–09
- Taça de Portugal: 2005–06, 2008–09
- Supertaça Cândido de Oliveira: 2006

Lyon

- Coupe de France: 2011–12

Internacional

- Campeonato Gaúcho: 2015

Racing Club

- Argentine Primera División: 2018–19
- Trofeo de Campeones: 2019

Individual

- Argentine Primera División top scorer: 2004 Apertura, 2018–19
- SJPF Player of the Month: January 2008, February 2008
- Bola de Prata: 2007–08
- LPFP Primeira Liga Player of the Year: 2007–08
- CNID Footballer of the Year: 2008
- UNFP Ligue 1 Player of the Month: August 2009
- UNFP Ligue 1 Player of the Year: 2009–10
- UNFP Ligue 1 Team of the Year: 2009–10
- Argentine Primera División Best Player: 2018–19
- Argentine Primera División Best Forward: 2018–19
- Argentine Primera División Team of the Year: 2018–19
