= Julien Valéro =

French footballer (born 1984)

Personal information
- Date of birth: February 23, 1984 (age 42)
- Place of birth: Perpignan, France
- Height: 1.87 m (6 ft 2 in)
- Position: Striker

Youth career
- 2002–2004: Caen

Senior career*
Years	Team	Apps	(Gls)
2004–2007	Caen	29	(1)
2007–2008	Nîmes	15	(0)
2008–2009	Sète	30	(3)
2009–2011	Beauvais	52	(6)
2011–2012	Quevilly	35	(6)
2012–2014	Luçon	44	(6)
Total		205	(22)
- * Club domestic league appearances and goals

Julien Valéro (born 23 February 1984) is a French former professional footballer who played as a striker. During his career, he played for Caen, Nîmes, Sète, Beauvais, Quevilly and Luçon.

== Career ==
Born in Perpignan, Valéro's family moved to Granville, Manche when he was young. He began playing professional football with Caen in the north of France, where his size (1.87 meters) made him a formidable striker. After starting at Caen, Valéro spent most of his career in the lower levels of French football. His finest moments were during Quevilly's historic run to the 2012 Coupe de France Final. Valéro scored four goals for Quevilly during the competition, including one in the quarter-final against Olympique de Marseille played at his former club's Stade Michel d'Ornano.
