= Cris (footballer, born 1977) =

Brazilian football manager and former player

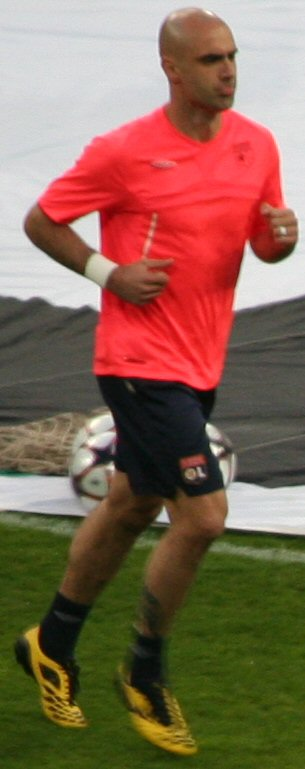
- Cris in 2010

Personal information
- Full name: Cristiano Marques Gomes
- Date of birth: 3 June 1977 (age 49)
- Place of birth: Guarulhos, Brazil
- Height: 1.83 m (6 ft 0 in)
- Position: Centre-back

Youth career
- 1990–1995: Corinthians

Senior career*
Years	Team	Apps	(Gls)
1995–1999	Corinthians	26	(0)
1999–2004	Cruzeiro	122	(13)
2003	→ Bayer Leverkusen (loan)	2	(0)
2004–2012	Lyon	224	(20)
2012	Galatasaray	10	(1)
2013	Grêmio	3	(0)
2013–2014	Vasco da Gama	24	(1)
Total		411	(35)

International career
1999–2000	Brazil U23	5	(0)
2001–2009	Brazil	17	(1)

Managerial career
- 2016–2017: Lyon U19
- 2017–2018: Lyon B
- 2019–2021: GOAL FC (Note: In 2020, Monts d'Or Azergues Foot merged with several smaller clubs to form GOAL FC.)
- 2021–2022: Le Mans
- 2022–2023: Versailles
- 2024–2025: Châteauroux
- * Club domestic league appearances and goals

Cristiano Marques Gomes (born 3 June 1977), or simply Cris, is a Brazilian football manager and a former player. A former centre-back, Cris is known as Le policier ("The Policeman") due to his authoritative manner on the pitch.

He won four consecutive Ligue 1 titles with French club Lyon between 2005 and 2008, as well as the Brazilian Championship in 1998 with Corinthians, and in 2003 with Cruzeiro, and he also won the Copa do Brasil in 1995 with Corinthians, and in 2000 with Cruzeiro. Cris played 17 games for Brazil between 2001 and 2009, winning the Copa América in 2004. He was also chosen for the 2001 Copa América and the 2006 FIFA World Cup.

Cris began coaching with Lyon's under-19 team in 2016. He then managed several senior clubs in France's lower leagues.

== Club career ==
=== Early career ===
Cris spent a three-year spell in São Paulo playing for Corinthians (1995–98) before joining Cruzeiro. There, he won his first cap for the national team, playing on 4 April 1999 against the United States in Brasília (a match won 7–0 by Brazil). In 2000, Brazilian magazine Placar named Cris as the leading player in his position during the Brazilian Championship, awarding him the Silver Ball title. In 2002, he secured a transfer to Europe, moving to Bundesliga club Bayer Leverkusen. This move, however, did not prove successful as he struggled to adapt to his new surroundings both on and off the field. The following year saw him return to his native country, rejoining Cruzeiro as part of their Brazilian championship-winning team of that year.

=== Lyon ===
In August 2004, Cris left Brazil once more, this time moving to Lyon for a transfer fee close to €3.5 million. Having been involved in a brawl during a match in June earlier that year, Cris ran the risk of a six-month suspension that the Brazilian Football Confederation eventually decided not to extend to matches outside of Brazil. This affair, along with the physical duel he enjoyed with Thierry Henry during the France–Brazil international at the Stade de France on 20 May 2004, earned Cris the reputation of a rough, rugged defender.

After an unconvincing first spell in Europe, Cris quickly imposed himself at the heart of Lyon's defense. His first season in Ligue 1 saw the club crowned league champions and Cris was selected to the UNFP Ligue 1 Team of the Year. His second season was one of consolidation: Cris again had an excellent season with Lyon leaving no doubt as to his overall class. He was crowned "étoile d'or" ("Gold Star") by France Football magazine. The newspaper L'Equipe considered him the best defender of the 2005–06 season and he was once more voted to the Ligue 1 Team of the Year by his fellow professionals. This season earned him an upwardly revised salary as well as a one-year extension to his contract, tying him to the French club until 2010. Cris later extended his contract an additional year, keeping him at Lyon until 2011.

For the 2007–08 season, newly appointed Lyon manager Alain Perrin appointed Cris as the new captain . On 11 August 2007, Cris was injured in a game between Lyon and Toulouse, tearing ligaments in his right knee during a collision with Johan Elmander. Cris made his return to the squad on 1 March 2008 in a 1–0 win over Lille. The match was held at the Stade de France. On 17 March 2012, Cris suffered a calf injury in a 1–0 derby win over Saint-Étienne that ruled him out for a month.

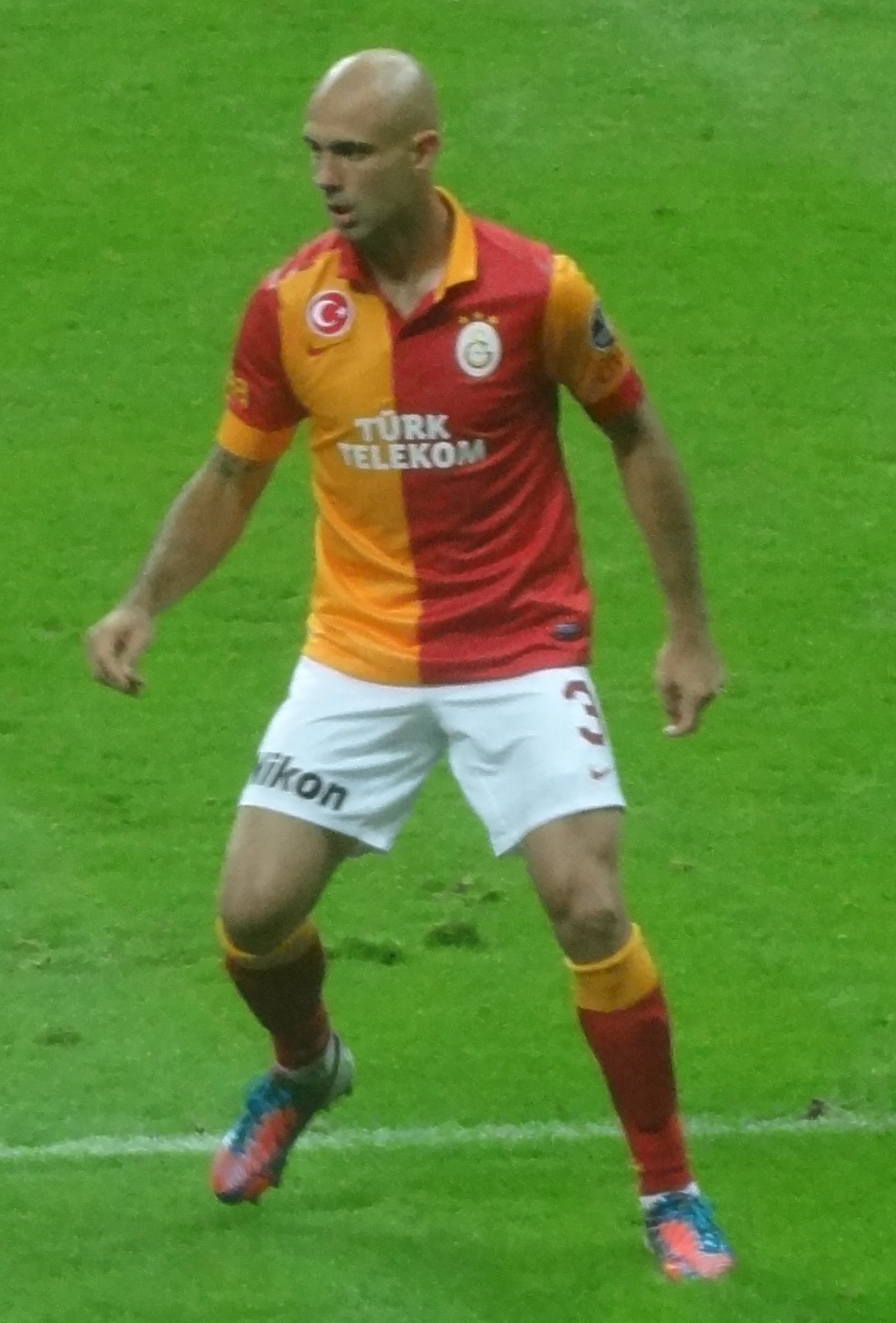
Cris in Galatasaray colours, 2012

=== Galatasaray ===
On 3 September 2012, after eight years with Lyon, Cris signed for Turkish side Galatasaray for a €1.25 million transfer, plus bonuses, and signed a 1+1-year contract. He scored his first goal for Galatasaray on 28 October 2012 in the Süper Lig match against Kayserispor, a 3–0 home win. On 2 January 2013, after just four months in Turkey, Galatasaray terminated Cris' contract, prompting him to return to his native Brazil where he signed for Grêmio.

=== Grêmio ===
On 3 January 2013, one day after breaking his contract with Galatasaray, Cris signed with Brazilian side Grêmio. He arrived at the club as a direct replacement for Gilberto Silva, who had consequently transferred to Atlético Mineiro.

=== Vasco da Gama ===
On 31 July 2013, Cris signed with Vasco da Gama. His first match was against Grêmio, a 2–3 loss. Cris was released from the club in January 2014 after his contract was not renewed.

== International career ==
Cris earned 17 caps with the Brazil national team, the first earned in July 2001. Later that month he played at the 2001 Copa América, in which his team lost in the quarter-finals to Honduras. His only goal for Brazil came in a 6–0 friendly victory over Bolivia on 31 January 2002. He was a regular under incoming manager Luiz Felipe Scolari, who had coached him at Cruzeiro, but was excluded from the 2002 FIFA World Cup squad that ended up winning the tournament due to receiving too many red cards for his club; Scolari filled his place with Ânderson Polga but preferred to start Roque Júnior, Lúcio and Edmílson.

Cris was chosen for the 2004 Copa América; he came on as a substitute in the final against Argentina, replacing Luisão for the final eight minutes and the penalty shootout victory, in which he was not chosen to shoot. He was a late addition to the 2006 FIFA World Cup squad in Germany due to Roque Júnior's injury.

Having not played since a game with Russia on 1 March 2006 – including at the World Cup – Cris was recalled to the Brazil squad in November 2009 for friendlies against Oman and England in Qatar. He was called up by Dunga due to issues with other centre-backs, including Juan not being allowed to travel by A.S. Roma, Luisão's appendicitis, Thiago Silva's document issues and Naldo's injury. On 17 November, he played as a substitute in a 2–0 win over Oman in his final game.

== Coaching career ==
Cris returned to Lyon, initially as under-15 manager, before taking the under-19 team in 2016–17. In 2017–18, he led the reserve team in the fourth-tier Championnat National 2, before leaving the club in June 2018. A year later, he was hired at Monts d'Or Azergues in the same division.

On 31 May 2021, Cris signed for Le Mans in the third-tier Championnat National. He was sacked on 11 November 2022 with the club 13th after 11 games, and following elimination from the Coupe de France by Union sportive Fougères from two leagues below.

Days after his exit from Le Mans, Cris was hired by Versailles in the same league. He won 2–0 away to Villefranche on his debut on 25 November 2022, and set a target of promotion to Ligue 2. He quit the club at the end of the season, having missed his aim by finishing fifth.

On 28 October 2024, Cris was hired at Châteauroux, last-placed in the Championnat National. In February, before a game against Quevilly-Rouen, he made a speech to his players in which he likened winning a game to having sex with women; a video was posted to the club's social media accounts, for which he and the club apologised. He left at the end of the season, with his team having been relegated.

== Career statistics ==
=== Club ===
Appearances and goals by club, season and competition
Club	Season	League			National cup (Note: Includes DFB-Pokal, Coupe de France)		League cup (Note: Includes Coupe de la Ligue)		Continental		Other		Total	
Club	Season	Division	Apps	Goals	Apps	Goals	Apps	Goals	Apps	Goals	Apps	Goals	Apps	Goals
Corinthians	1995	Série A	2	0			–		0	0	–		2	0
Corinthians	1996	Série A	0	0			–		3	1	–		3	1
Corinthians	1997	Série A	9	0			–		0	0	–		9	0
Corinthians	1998	Série A	15	0			–		0	0	–		15	0
Corinthians	1999	Série A	0	0			–		4	0	–		4	0
Corinthians	Total		26	0	0	0	0	0	7	1	0	0	33	1
Cruzeiro	1999	Série A	12	0			–		0	0	–		12	0
Cruzeiro	2000	Série A	22	3			–		5	1	–		27	4
Cruzeiro	2001	Série A	19	3			–		13	1	–		32	4
Cruzeiro	2002	Série A	25	3			–		0	0	–		25	3
Cruzeiro	2003	Série A	31	3			–		1	0	–		32	3
Cruzeiro	2004	Série A	13	1			–		8	1	–		21	2
Cruzeiro	Total		122	13	0	0	0	0	27	3	0	0	149	16
Bayer Leverkusen (loan)	2002–03	Bundesliga	2	0	1	0	–		4 (Note: Appearance(s) in UEFA Champions League)	0	–		7	0
Lyon	2004–05	Ligue 1	33	3	3	0	0	0	9	2	0	0	45	5
Lyon	2005–06	Ligue 1	36	3	4	1	0	0	10	1	0	0	50	5
Lyon	2006–07	Ligue 1	32	4	4	0	1	1	7	0	0	0	44	5
Lyon	2007–08	Ligue 1	13	1	3	0	0	0	1	0	1 (Note: Appearance in Trophée des Champions)	0	18	1
Lyon	2008–09	Ligue 1	34	2	3	0	1	1	6	0	1	0	45	3
Lyon	2009–10	Ligue 1	34	4	1	0	1	0	14	0	–		50	4
Lyon	2010–11	Ligue 1	20	1	1	0	0	0	5	0	–		26	1
Lyon	2011–12	Ligue 1	20	2	2	0	2	0	4	0	–		28	2
Lyon	2012–13	Ligue 1	2	0	0	0	0	0	0	0	1	0	3	0
Lyon	Total		224	20	21	1	5	2	56	3	3	0	309	26
Galatasaray	2012–13	Süper Lig	10	1	0	0	–		1	0	–		11	1
Grêmio	2013	Série A	3	0			–		7	0	–		10	0
Vasco da Gama	2013	Série A	24	1			–		0	0	–		24	1
Career total			411	35	22	1	5	2	102	7	3	0	543	45

=== International ===
Appearances and goals by national team and year
National team	Year	Apps	Goals
Brazil	2001	8	0
Brazil	2002	3	1
Brazil	2004	4	0
Brazil	2006	1	0
Brazil	2009	1	0
Total		17	1

#	Date	Venue	Opponent	Score	Result	Competition
1.	31 January 2002	Estádio Serra Dourada, Goiânia, Brazil	Bolivia	1–0	6–0	Friendly

== Managerial statistics ==
As of 31 May 2023

Team	From	To	Record							
Team	From	To	M	W	D	L	GF	GA	GD	Win %
GOAL FC	6 June 2019	30 May 2021	35	20	8	7	61	35	+26	57.14
Le Mans	31 May 2021	6 November 2022	52	20	15	17	73	56	+17	38.46
Versailles	18 November 2022	31 May 2023	22	9	5	8	25	26	−1	40.91
Total			109	49	28	32	159	117	+42	44.95

== Honours ==
Corinthians

- Campeonato Brasileiro Série A: 1998
- Copa do Brasil: 1995
- Campeonato Paulista: 1995, 1997, 1999

Cruzeiro

- Campeonato Brasileiro Série A: 2003
- Copa do Brasil: 2000
- Campeonato Mineiro: 2004

Lyon

- Ligue 1: 2004–05, 2005–06, 2006–07, 2007–08
- Coupe de France: 2011–12
- Trophée des Champions: 2005, 2007, 2012

Brazil

- Copa América: 2004

Individual

- Bola de Prata: 2000
- Ligue 1 Team of the Year: 2004–05, 2005–06, 2006–07
- ESM Team of the Year: 2005–06
