= Bakary Koné =

Burkinabé footballer (born 1988)

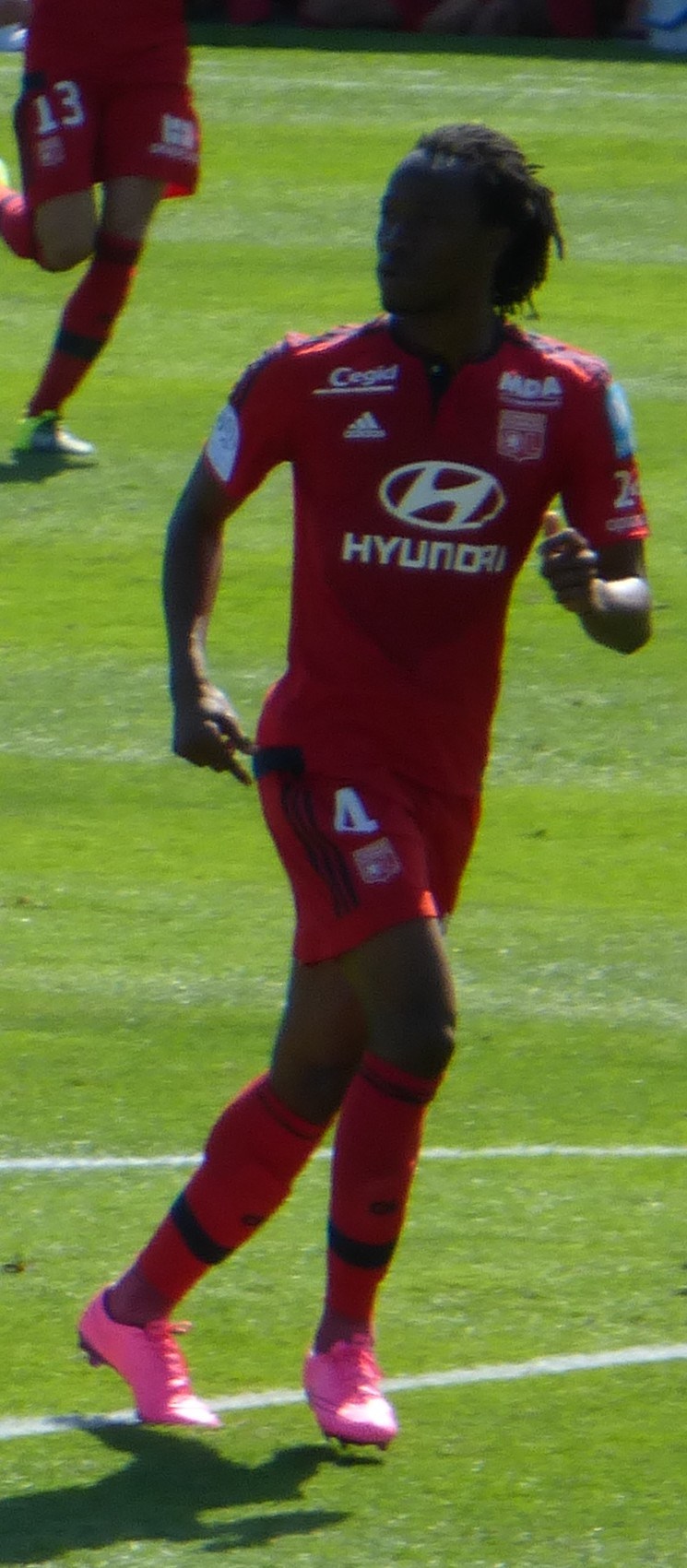
- Koné with Lyon in 2015

Personal information
- Date of birth: 27 April 1988 (age 38)
- Place of birth: Ouagadougou, Burkina Faso
- Height: 1.88 m (6 ft 2 in)
- Position: Centre-back

Youth career
- 2002–2004: CFTPK Abidjan
- 2004–2005: Étoile Filante

Senior career*
Years	Team	Apps	(Gls)
2005–2006	Étoile Filante	37	(1)
2006–2008	Guingamp B	25	(1)
2006–2011	Guingamp	112	(5)
2011–2016	Lyon	89	(6)
2011–2016	Lyon B	3	(0)
2016–2018	Málaga	7	(0)
2017–2018	→ Strasbourg (loan)	28	(1)
2018–2019	Ankaragücü	14	(0)
2019–2020	Arsenal Tula	1	(0)
2020–2021	Kerala Blasters	14	(0)

International career
2006–2019	Burkina Faso	83	(0)
Medal record
Representing Burkina Faso
Africa Cup of Nations
Runner-up	2013 South Africa
Third place	2017 Gabon
- * Club domestic league appearances and goals

Bakary Koné (French pronunciation: [bakaʁi kɔne], born 27 April 1988) is a Burkinabé former professional footballer who played as a centre-back.

== Club career ==
=== Early career ===
Koné played on youth side for CFTPK Abidjan and joined in 2004 to ÉF Ouagadougou where he began his professional career in 2005.

=== Guingamp ===
In July 2006 Koné signed for Guingamp. He played his first game for Guingamp on 11 May 2007 against Tours FC in the Ligue 2. Whilst at Guingamp, then in Ligue 2, Koné played in the 2009 Coupe de France Final in which they beat Rennes. After making 112 appearances for the club from five seasons, he was signed by Lyon in 2011.

=== Lyon ===
Koné joined Lyon on 11 August 2011 and signed a five-year deal for a €3.8 million transfer fee. He scored his first goal with Lyon in the UEFA Champions League play-offs against Rubin Kazan on 24 August 2011. He scored his second goal, again in the Champions League in the group stage against Dinamo Zagreb on 27 September of the same year. During his five years at Lyon, he made 89 appearances for the club and also scored 9 goals. He left the club in 2016 after his regular contract ran out.

=== Malaga ===
On 27 June 2016, Koné signed a three-year deal with La Liga side Málaga. On 26 August 2017, he moved to Ligue 1 side RC Strasbourg on a season-long loan. On 28 July 2018, Koné terminated his contract with Málaga.

=== Ankaragücü ===
Koné joined Turkish club Ankaragücü during the August transfer window. He spent one season in Turkey and made 14 appearances for the club.

=== Arsenal Tula ===
On 28 January 2019, Koné signed a 1.5-year contract with the Russian Premier League club Arsenal Tula. On 2 December 2019, he was removed by Arsenal from their league registration list after only appearing in one league game in 2019.

=== Kerala Blasters ===
On 21 October 2020, Indian Super League club Kerala Blasters FC announced the signing of Koné on a season-long contract. He is the second Burkinabe to sign for an Indian Super League club. He made his debut for the Blasters against Mohun Bagan on 20 November 2020 which ended in a 1–0 loss. On 11 June 2021, it was announced that Bakary along with five other players has left the club.

== International career ==
Koné made his debut for the Burkino Faso on 7 October 2006 at the age of 18. He played the entire 90 minutes where Burkino Faso defeated Senegal 1–0 in the Africa Cup of Nations Qualification. He was the member of the Burkino Faso squad that played in the 2013 Africa Cup of Nations. He played the entire minutes in the tournament and Burkino Faso became the runners up of the tournament for the first time in the history. In the final he won the Fair Player of the Match Award. On 14 November 2014, Koné captained his national side for the first time in an African Nations Cup Qualification match against Angola. With 83 appearances, Koné is the third most capped player for his country.

== Career statistics ==
As of match played on 2 July 2018

Appearances and goals by club, season and competition
Club	Season	League			National cup (Note: Includes Coupe de France)		League cup (Note: Includes Coupe de la Ligue)		Other		Total	
Club	Season	Division	Apps	Goals	Apps	Goals	Apps	Goals	Apps	Goals	Apps	Goals
Guingamp	2006–07	Ligue 2	2	0	0	0	0	0	—		2	0
Guingamp	2007–08	Ligue 2	9	0	0	0	1	0	—		10	0
Guingamp	2008–09	Ligue 2	32	1	7	2	2	0	—		41	3
Guingamp	2009–10	Ligue 2	31	1	1	0	1	0	2 (Note: One appearance in both UEFA Europa League and Trophée des Champions)	0	35	1
Guingamp	2010–11	National	36	2	1	0	3	0	—		40	2
Guingamp	2011–12	Ligue 2	2	1	0	0	2	0	—		4	1
Guingamp	Total		112	5	9	2	9	0	2	0	132	7
Lyon	2011–12	Ligue 1	28	2	4	0	0	0	9 (Note: Appearances in UEFA Champions League)	2	41	4
Lyon	2012–13	Ligue 1	14	1	1	0	1	0	6 (Note: Five appearances in UEFA Europa League, One appearance in Trophée des Champions)	0	22	1
Lyon	2013–14	Ligue 1	24	2	3	0	3	0	14 (Note: Eleven appearances in UEFA Europa League, Three appearances in UEFA Champions League)	0	44	2
Lyon	2014–15	Ligue 1	17	1	0	0	1	0	4 (Note: Appearances in UEFA Europa League)	0	22	1
Lyon	2015–16	Ligue 1	6	0	2	0	2	0	2 (Note: One appearance in both UEFA Champions League and Trophée des Champions)	0	12	0
Lyon	Total		89	6	10	0	7	0	35	2	141	8
Lyon B	2011–12	National 2	2	0	—		—		—		2	0
Lyon B	2013–14	National 2	1	0	—		—		—		1	0
Lyon B	Total		3	0	0	0	0	0	0	0	3	0
Málaga	2016–17	La Liga	7	0	0	0	—		—		7	0
Málaga	2017–18	La Liga	0	0	0	0	—		—		0	0
Málaga	Total		7	0	0	0	0	0	0	0	7	0
Strasbourg (loan)	2017–18	Ligue 1	28	1	3	0	2	0	—		33	1
Career total			238	12	21	2	18	0	37	2	316	16

== Honours ==
Guingamp

- Coupe de France: 2008–09

Lyon

- Coupe de France: 2011–12
- Trophée des Champions: 2012

Burkina-Faso

- African Cup of Nations runner-up: 2013, third place: 2017

Individual

- Africa Cup of Nations Team of the Tournament: 2013
