= Rémi Garde =

French footballer (born 1966)

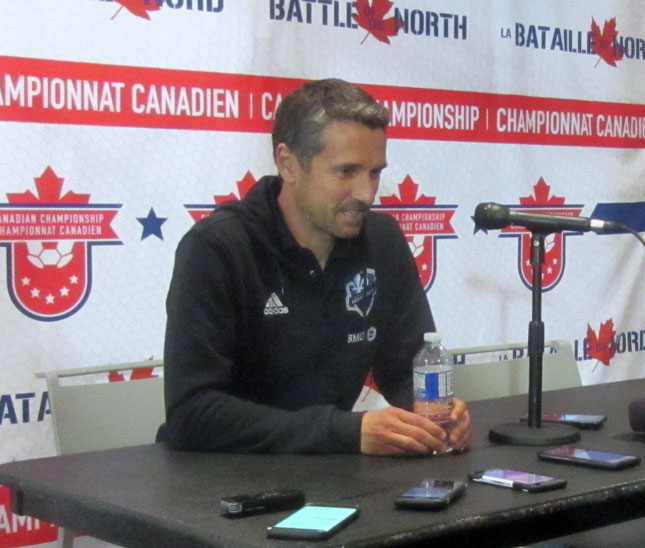
- Garde in 2019

Personal information
- Full name: Rémi Marie François Garde
- Date of birth: 3 April 1966 (age 60)
- Place of birth: L'Arbresle, Rhône, France
- Height: 1.75 m (5 ft 9 in)
- Positions: Defensive midfielder; centre back

Senior career*
Years	Team	Apps	(Gls)
1987–1993	Lyon	146	(22)
1993–1996	Strasbourg	68	(3)
1996–1999	Arsenal	31	(0)
Total		245	(25)

International career
1990–1992	France	6	(0)

Managerial career
- 2011–2014: Lyon
- 2015–2016: Aston Villa
- 2017–2019: Montreal Impact
- * Club domestic league appearances and goals

Rémi Marie François Garde (French pronunciation: [ʁemi ɡaʁd], born 3 April 1966) is a French former professional footballer. He was most recently the head coach of Montreal Impact in Major League Soccer.

He played as a defender and defensive midfielder, spending most of his career with his first club Lyon, with whom he won the 1988–89 French Division 2. In 1993, he moved to Strasbourg, reaching the Coupe de France final and winning the UEFA Intertoto Cup in his second season. He joined Arsenal in 1996, where he won the 1997–98 FA Premier League before retiring through injury a year later. Garde was capped by the France national team, featuring in their squad at UEFA Euro 1992.

Upon retirement as a player, he worked as a coach and assistant manager at Lyon, before taking the managerial position there in 2011. He won the Coupe de France and Trophée des Champions the following year, and left in 2014 for personal reasons. He was hired by Aston Villa in November 2015, and left five months later. He was hired by Montreal Impact in Major League Soccer in November 2017, and was sacked in August 2019.

== Club career ==
Born in L'Arbresle, Rhône, Garde started his playing career at nearby Lyon in 1982, helping the club achieve promotion to Ligue 1 in 1989. Playing as a defensive midfielder or sweeper, he became club captain. Garde left Lyon in 1993 to join Strasbourg, where he spent three seasons and reached a Coupe de France final in 1995. In the summer, the team won the 1995 UEFA Intertoto Cup, defeating Austria's Admira Wacker in the final.

He moved to England in August 1996, joining Arsenal after compatriot Arsène Wenger recommended him to the club; Wenger was not Arsenal's manager at this stage, as he was seeing out his contract at Nagoya Grampus. Garde joined on the same day as Patrick Vieira, though unlike Vieira, the 30-year-old Garde was intended to be more of an experienced cover player rather than a future first-team regular.

Garde became known for his tidy and reliable performances as backup for Vieira or Emmanuel Petit; he played a total of 45 matches over three seasons for Arsenal, and was a member of the Double-winning side of 1997–98, making ten league appearances that season meaning he only narrowly qualified for a Premier League winners' medal. He also made one appearance during Arsenal's FA Cup run, which came in the quarter-final replay at West Ham United. The game went to a penalty shootout and despite Garde missing his kick, Arsenal prevailed. He was however not part of the squad as they won the 1998 FA Cup Final against Newcastle United at Wembley Stadium.

With age and a persistent knee injury limiting his appearances, Garde retired from professional football in June 1999, just after he had narrowly missed out on a second successive double with the club, who had finished second in the league and lost the FA Cup semi-final to Manchester United.

== International career ==
Garde made his debut for France at the 1990 Kuwait Tournament at the Al-Sadaqua Walsalam Stadium in Kuwait City. His first appearance came against the hosts in a 1–0 win on 21 January. He won six caps for his country, and was a member of the French squad at Euro 92 but did not play at all in the competition, in which the French were eliminated at the group stage in Sweden.

== Coaching career ==
=== Lyon ===
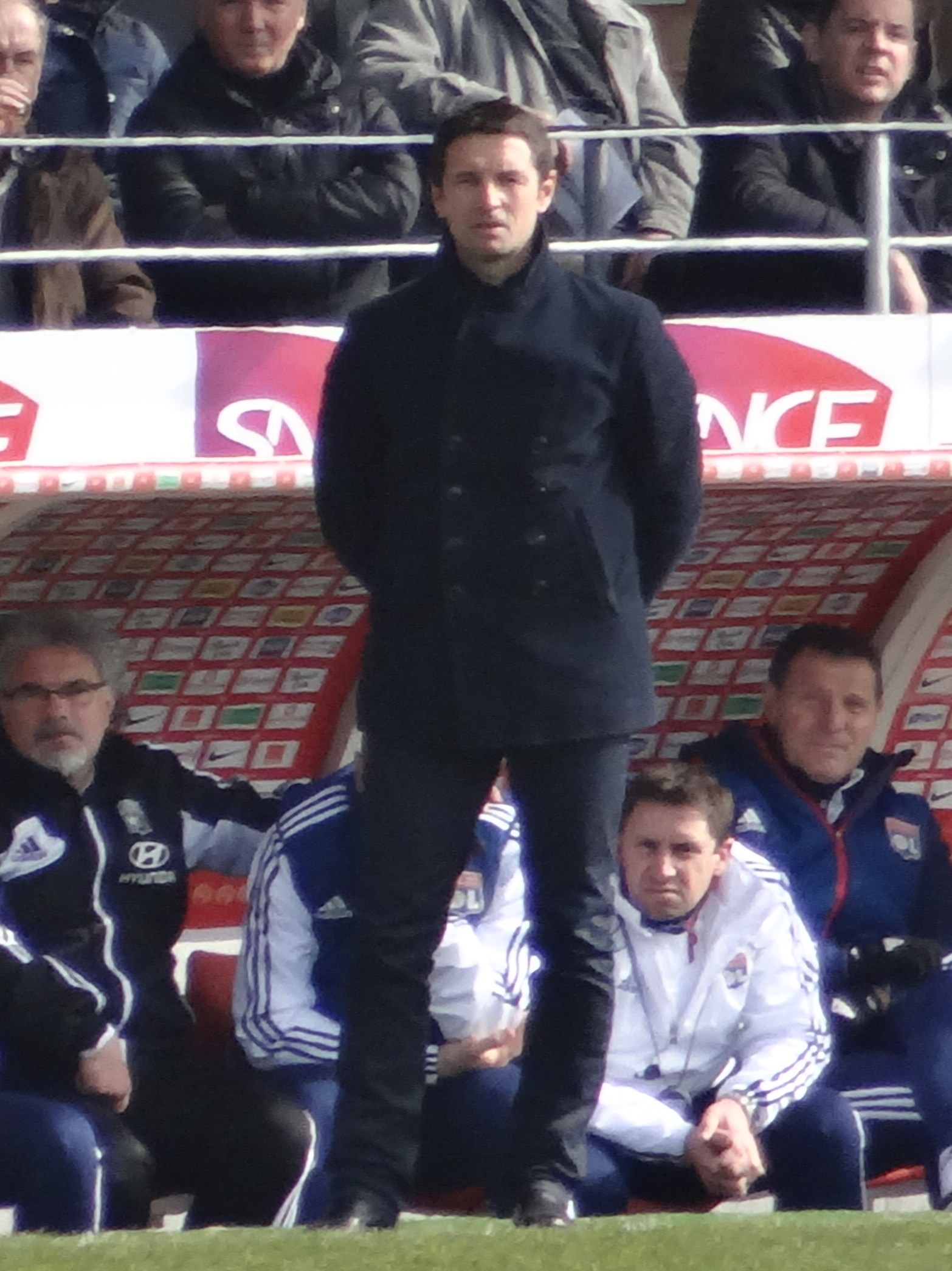
Garde managing Lyon in 2013

After a period working as a pundit on French television, he rejoined his old club Lyon as a coach in 2003, and helped the club to win Ligue 1 titles in 2003–04 and 2004–05. After the departure of Paul Le Guen as manager in the summer of 2005, Garde became assistant to his replacement Gérard Houllier. In May 2007, with his contract due to expire, Garde was linked to a return to Arsenal as director of football, a new role created to replace that of the recently departed vice-chairman David Dein.

In 2010, he worked as the director of the Centre Tola Vologe, Lyon's training complex. On 22 June 2011, he was appointed as Lyon's new manager to replace Claude Puel.

While at the helm of Les Gones, Garde won the Coupe de France title of 2011–12 as well as the Trophee des Champions of the same year. He left at the end of the 2013–14 season for personal and family reasons.

=== Aston Villa ===
On 2 November 2015, Garde agreed a three-and-a-half-year deal to become the manager of Premier League side Aston Villa who were bottom of the table. Six days later, in Garde's first match in charge, his new team drew 0–0 with league leaders Manchester City.

Garde put a strong emphasis on discipline at Villa. He dropped midfielder Jack Grealish from the first team after he went partying following a 4–0 loss at Everton and warned the team not to party excessively over the Christmas period. On 29 March 2016, with Villa still bottom of the league, Garde left the club by mutual consent.

=== Montreal Impact ===
After more than 18 months out of work, Garde was named coach of Montreal Impact in Major League Soccer on 8 November 2017. In his first competitive fixture, away to fellow Canadians Vancouver Whitecaps FC, the Impact lost 2–1. Montreal competed for a playoff position for much of Garde's first season. After a 1–0 loss to the New England Revolution on the final day of the regular season, the Impact failed to qualify for the MLS Cup Playoffs.

Garde was sacked by Montreal on 21 August 2019, and replaced by former Houston Dynamo head coach Wílmer Cabrera.

== Managerial statistics ==
As of match played 17 August 2019

Managerial record by team and tenure
Team	From	To	Record					Ref.
Team	From	To	P	W	D	L	Win %	Ref.
Lyon	22 June 2011	23 May 2014	168	85	38	45	50.6	
Aston Villa	2 November 2015	29 March 2016	23	3	7	13	13.0	
Montreal Impact	8 November 2017	21 August 2019	67	28	9	30	41.8	
Total			258	116	54	88	45.0	

== Honours ==
=== Player ===
Lyon

- Ligue 2: 1988–89

Strasbourg

- UEFA Intertoto Cup: 1995
- Coupe de France runner-up: 1994–95

Arsenal

- Premier League: 1997–98

=== Manager ===
Lyon

- Coupe de France: 2011–12
- Trophée des Champions: 2012
