= 2011–12 Coupe de France =

The Coupe Charles Simon

Tournament details
- Country: France
- Teams: 7,422

Final positions
- Champions: Lyon
- Runners-up: Quevilly

Tournament statistics
- Top goal scorer(s): Lisandro Lopez (7 goals)

The 2011–12 Coupe de France was the 95th season of France's most prestigious cup competition. The competition was organized by the French Football Federation (FFF) and open to all clubs in French football, including clubs from the overseas departments and territories (Guadeloupe, French Guiana, Martinique, Mayotte, New Caledonia, French Polynesia, and Réunion). The final was contested on 28 April 2012 at the Stade de France. The defending champions were Lille, who defeated Paris Saint-Germain 1–0 in the final of the 2010–11 season. The winner of the competition qualified for the group stage of the 2012–13 UEFA Europa League.

On 28 April 2012, first division club Lyon defeated semi-professional third-tier Quevilly 1–0 in the 2012 Coupe de France Final courtesy of a first half goal from Lisandro López to win its fifth Coupe de France title. The title is the club's first domestically since winning the same competition in 2008. The runners-up, Quevilly, alongside fellow National club Gazélec Ajaccio, were awarded the Petit Poucet Plaque, an award given to the best performing non-professional club in the Coupe de France.

== Calendar ==
On 17 June 2011, the FFF announced the calendar for the 95th Coupe de France season.

Round	First match date	Fixtures	Clubs	New entries this round	Prize money	Notes
First Round	13 August 2011	3,016	7,429 → 4,413	6,032		
Second Round	27 August 2011	2,097	4,413 → 2,316	1,178		
Third Round	17 September 2011	1,097	2,316 → 1,219	97		Clubs participating in CFA 2 gain entry.
Fourth Round	1 October 2011	576	1,219 → 643	55		Clubs participating in CFA gain entry.
Fifth Round	15 October 2011	298	643 → 345	20		Clubs participating in National gain entry.
Sixth Round	29 October 2011	149	345 → 196	none	€1,500	
Seventh Round	19 November 2011	88	196 → 108	20	€6,000	Clubs participating in Ligue 2 gain entry.
Eighth Round	10 December 2011	44	108 → 64	none	€35,000	
Round of 64	7 January 2012	32	64 → 32	20	€40,000	Clubs participating in Ligue 1 gain entry.
Round of 32	21 January 2012	16	32 → 16	none	€60,000	
Round of 16	7 February 2012	8	16 → 8	none	€130,000	
Quarter-finals	20 March 2012	4	8 → 4	none	€280,000	
Semi-finals	10 April 2012	2	4 → 2	none	€560,000	
Final	28 April 2012	1	2 → 1	none	€700,000	Coupe de France Final at the Stade de France.

== News ==
=== Coupe de France final date change ===
In February 2011, it was reported by the French media that the French Football Federation had scheduled the 2011–12 edition of the Coupe de France final to be played on 5 May 2012. The date is significant because it would mark the 20th anniversary of the Furiani disaster, which occurred when a tribune at the Stade Armand Cesari in Furiani collapse during a Coupe de France semi-final match between SC Bastia and Marseille. The tragedy resulted in the death of 18 individuals and injuries to over 2,000. The resulting outcry and criticism of the decision to schedule the final on that date led to the Federation issuing a statement declaring that the official calendar for the competition had not been released, so the reports were only rumors. On 31 March 2011, the schedule was released and the date for the final was set for 28 April 2012.

=== Tourcoing and Viry-Châtillon ruling ===
In the 2010–11 Coupe de France, a seventh round match between Tourcoing and Viry-Châtillon was abandoned after 30 minutes following an altercation between two opposing players, which resulted in a brawl breaking out and dozens of spectators invading the field of play. The brawl led to a player losing consciousness and an assistant referee suffering a back injury after being hit with debris. The incident required police and firefighter intervention and, despite handing out four red cards as a result of the altercation, the referee called the match off after repeated failed attempts to restore calm. On 3 December 2010, the French Football Federation ruled that, due to the incidents that occurred in the match, both clubs would be disbarred from this year's competition, effective immediately. Both clubs will also be ineligible to appear in the 2011–12 competition, as well.

== Regional qualifying rounds ==
All of the teams that enter the competition, but are not members of Ligue 1 or Ligue 2, have to compete in the regional qualifying rounds. The regional qualifying rounds determine the number of regional clubs that will earn spots in the 7th round and normally lasts six rounds.

== Seventh Round ==
The draw for the seventh round of the Coupe de France was held on 3 November 2011 at the headquarters of the Comité National Olympique et Sportif Français (CNOSF), the national sporting committee of France, and was conducted by former French internationals Grégory Coupet, Willy Sagnol, Olivier Dacourt, and Xavier Gravelaine as well as current French women's international Élise Bussaglia. The overseas regional draw was held the previous day on 2 November at the headquarters of the French Football Federation. The matches were played on 18–20 November.

Tie no	Home team	Score	Away team
1	Vallée de la Gresse	0–1 (a.e.t.)	Chamalières
2	Feurs	1–2 (a.e.t.)	Clermont
3	L'Etrat La Tour	0–6	Grenoble
4	Annecy	1–4	Lyon Duchère
5	Rachais	1–3	Thiers
6	Domerat	1–1 (a.e.t.) (3–4 p)	Lyon Décines
7	Gieres	2–9	Gazélec Ajaccio
8	Alès	0–5	AS Monaco
9	Gravelines	3–0	Deville Maromme
10	Dunkerque	1-0	Rouen
11	Longuenesse	1–3	Calais
12	AC Amiens	1–3	Le Havre
13	Sannois Saint-Gratien	2–1 (a.e.t.)	Lens
14	La Gorgue	0–1 (a.e.t.)	Chantilly
15	Le Portel	1–0	Dieppe
16	Aire-sur-la-Lys	0–1	Marck
17	Marseille Ardziv	0–0 (a.e.t.) (3–4 p)	Calvi
18	La Grand-Motte	0–2	La Tour-Saint Clair
19	Aubagne	0–1	Fréjus Saint-Raphaël
20	Bourg de Péage	1–0 (a.e.t.)	Castelnau le Crès
21	La Seyne-sur-Mer	0−8	Bastia
22	Montélimar	1−4	Bourg-Péronnas
23	Marseille Félix Pyat	0–1	Uzès-Pont-du-Gard
24	Valence	2–0 (a.e.t.)	Arles-Avignon
25	Sundhoffen	0–3	Montceau Bourgogne
26	Saint Vit	2–1	Dinsheim
27	Belfort Sud	0–1 (a.e.t.)	Mulhouse
28	Beaune	4–0	Saverne
29	Mâcon	0–1	Sedan
30	Holtzwihr	0–3	Louhans-Cuiseaux
31	Ornans	0–4	Créteil
32	Pontarlier	3–1	Amiens SC
33	Haguenau	1–5	Forbach
34	Naborienne Saint-Avold	1–3	Prix-lès-Mézières
35	Adamswiller	0–2	Reims
36	Yutz	0–3	Paris
37	Metz	4–1 (a.e.t.)	Beauvais
38	Verdun Belleville	0–2 (a.e.t.)	Strasbourg
39	Schiltigheim	2–1	Saint-Dié
40	Magny	0–1	Jarville
41	Montagnarde	1–1 (a.e.t.) (3–1 p)	Mondeville
42	Fougère	0–1 (a.e.t.)	Vannes
43	Alençon	1–2	Changé

Tie no	Home team	Score	Away team
44	Tregunc	1–3	Tour d'Auvergne Rennes
45	Cesson	2–3 (a.e.t.)	Vitré
46	Plouhinec	0–3	Le Mans
47	Saint-Malo	1–2	Guingamp
48	Les Sables-d'Olonne	2–1 (a.e.t.)	Pontivy
49	La Flèche	1–2	Limoges
50	Evry	2–0	Moulins
51	Nouaille	0–2	Troyes
52	Feytiat	0–2	Orléans
53	Versailles	3–1	Romorantin
54	Les Lilas	0–1 (a.e.t.)	Alfortville
55	Saran	3–2	Brétigny
56	Bourges	0–3	Istres
57	Aulnoye	1–1 (a.e.t.) (3–1 p)	Chambly
58	Racing Clermont	2–5	Quevilly
59	Villers Outreaux	2–0	La Chapelle-Saint-Luc
60	Feignies	3–2	Saint-Quentin
61	Wasquehal	0–0 (a.e.t.) (2–4 p)	Boulogne-sur-Mer
62	Drancy	3–0	Sézanne
63	Arras	3–1	Saint-Dizier
64	Avion	0–1	Tours
65	Olonne-sur-Mer	2–7	Saint-Colomban Locminé
66	Avrille	0–8	Vendée Fontenay
67	La Guerche-Drouges	1–2	Angers
68	La Suze-sur-Sarthe	0–1	Laval
69	Sablé-sur-Sarthe	4–2	Le Poiré-sur-Vie
70	Larmor Plage Goélands	0–2 (a.e.t.)	Les Herbiers
71	Chauray	2–3	Cherbourg
72	La Châtaigneraie	0–1	Vendée Luçon
73	Le Bouscat	1–3	Nantes
74	Tarbes	1–4	Niort
75	Trélissac	3–1	Balma
76	Brive	0–0 (a.e.t.) (4–2 p)	Luzenac
77	Toulouse Rodéo	1–0	Aurillac
78	Cugnaux	0–1	Perpignan Canet
79	Sarlat Marcillac	0–2	Mont-de-Marsan
80	Ytrac	0–4	Châteauroux
81	Auch	0–1	Bayonne

=== Overseas region ===
Tie no	Home team	Score	Away team
1	Tefana	1–2	Red Star
2	Evolucas	0–5	Avranches
3	Le Tampon	3–3 (a.e.t.) (2–4 p)	Amnéville
4	Ivry	4–2	Bélimois

Tie no	Home team	Score	Away team
5	Raon-l'Étape	6–0	Abeilles Mtsamboro
6	La Vitréenne	4–0	Matoury
7	Compiègne Oise	9–0	Gaïtcha

== Eighth Round ==
The draw for the eighth round of the Coupe de France was held on 23 November 2011 at the headquarters of the French Football Federation (FFF), and was conducted by former French internationals Luis Fernández and Laurent Robert. The round featured the 88 winners of the seventh round. The matches was played through 9–12 December.

Tie no	Home team	Score	Away team
1	Bourg de Péage	1–3	Lyon Duchère
2	Gazélec Ajaccio	3–0	Calvi
3	Louhans-Cuiseaux	0–4	Bastia
4	La Tour-Saint Clair	0–2	AS Monaco
5	Perpignan Canet	1–3	Fréjus Saint-Raphaël
6	Valence	3–2 (a.e.t.)	Grenoble
7	Montceau Bourgogne	1–0	Uzès-Pont-du-Gard
8	Lyon Décines	0–6	Istres
9	Vendée Luçon	1–0	Trélissac
10	Vendée Fontenay	2–4	Thiers
11	Brive	0–1	Tours
12	Niort	3–2	Bayonne
13	Chamalières	0–6	Châteauroux
14	Toulouse Rodéo	1–2	Limoges
15	Mont-de-Marsan	0–0 (a.e.t.) (4–5 p)	Clermont
16	Tour d'Auvergne Rennes	2–2 (a.e.t.) (4–3 p)	Nantes
17	Le Mans	1–0	Guingamp
18	Les Sables-d'Olonne	2–3	Vitré
19	Sablé-sur-Sarthe	4–1	La Vitréenne
20	Avranches	3–1	Les Herbiers
21	Saint-Colomban Locminé	2–1 (a.e.t.)	Vannes

Tie no	Home team	Score	Away team
22	Changé	1–2 (a.e.t.)	Montagnarde
23	Calais	1–2	Angers
24	Orléans	1–0	Ivry
25	Evry	1–1 (a.e.t.) (3–4 p)	Drancy
26	Gravelines	1–2 (a.e.t.)	Le Havre
27	Saran	1–2	Cherbourg
28	Sannois Saint-Gratien	0–2	Laval
29	Versailles	2–0	Alfortville
30	Feignies	1–1 (a.e.t.) (0–3 p)	Quevilly
31	Compiègne	2–1	Dunkerque
32	Chantilly	1–0	Le Portel
33	Marck	2–1	Reims
34	Villers-Outréaux	2–4	Créteil
35	Arras	0–2	Chambly
36	Paris	0–3	Boulogne-sur-Mer
37	Amnéville	2–3	Metz
38	Prix-lès-Mézières	1–0 (a.e.t.)	Schiltigheim
39	Jarville	0–4	Sedan
40	Saint-Vit	0–3	Bourg-Péronnas
41	Forbach	0–1	Red Star
42	Pontarlier	0–1	Strasbourg
43	Beaune	2–2 (a.e.t.) (0–3 p)	Mulhouse
44	Raon-l'Étape	3–3 (a.e.t.) (2–4 p)	Troyes

== Round of 64 ==
The draw for the Round of 64 of the Coupe de France was held on 12 December 2011 at the headquarters of Crédit Agricole, a main sponsor of the competition, in Amiens. The round featured the 44 winners of the eighth round, as well as the 20 clubs who play in Ligue 1. The matches was played through 6–9 January 2012.

Following the announcement of the draw, several amateur clubs who were hosting high-profile matches against Ligue 1 clubs announced that they would be re-locating their matches to more suitable venues. After initially scheduling its match against Montpellier to be played at the Stade Louis Dugauguez in Sedan, on 15 December, Prix-lès-Mézières confirmed that the two clubs had agreed to play the match at the Stade du Petit-Bois in nearby Charleville-Mézières. On the same day, it was announced that the Red Star Saint-Ouen–Marseille match would be played at the Stade de France, while the Saint-Colomban Locminé–Paris Saint-Germain match would be played at Stade du Moustoir in Lorient. In the former match, the country's national stadium was reconfigured to accommodate 45,000 individuals.

Tie no	Home team	Score	Away team
1	Vendée Luçon	2–1	Avranches
2	Cherbourg	1–2	Châteauroux
3	Sablé-sur-Sarthe	3–3 (a.e.t.) (4–2 p)	Sedan
4	Chambly	0–1 (a.e.t.)	Auxerre
5	Chantilly	0–6	Lille
6	Limoges	1–0	Boulogne-sur-Mer
7	Niort	2–0	Brest
8	Saint-Étienne	1–1 (a.e.t.) (2–4 p)	Bordeaux
9	Gazélec Ajaccio	1−0	Toulouse
10	Thiers	1–4	Istres
11	Valence	1–1 (a.e.t.) (7–6 p)	Laval
12	Versailles	1–5	Dijon
13	Lyon Duchère	1−3	Lyon
14	Le Havre	4–3	Lorient
15	Bourg-Péronnas	2–1 (a.e.t.)	Montceau Bourgogne
16	Fréjus Saint-Raphaël	0–3	Ajaccio
17	Bastia	4–1	Sochaux

Tie no	Home team	Score	Away team
18	Red Star	0–5	Marseille
19	Mulhouse	1−3	Créteil
20	Angers	4–3	AS Monaco
21	Drancy	3–3 (a.e.t.) (4–2 p)	Strasbourg
22	Caen	2–4 (a.e.t.)	Troyes
23	Marck	0–2	Nice
24	Prix-lès-Mézières	0–4	Montpellier
25	Compiègne	2–1 (a.e.t.)	Montagnarde
26	Saint-Colomban Locminé	1–2 (a.e.t.)	Paris Saint-Germain
27	Orléans	0–0 (a.e.t.) (5–3 p)	Clermont
28	Metz	2–2 (a.e.t.) (3–5 p)	Evian
29	Vitré	1–2	Tours
30	Le Mans	0–2	Valenciennes
31	Tour d'Auvergne Rennes	0–0 (a.e.t.) (4–5 p)	Quevilly
32	Rennes	3–0	Nancy

== Round of 32 ==
The draw for the Round of 32 of the Coupe de France was held on 8 January 2012 at the headquarters of Eurosport. The round featured the 32 winners of the Round of 64. The draw was conducted by current French women's international Gaëtane Thiney and former tennis player Amélie Mauresmo. The matches were played through 21–23 January 2012.

Similar to the previous round, following the draw, several amateur clubs announced that they would be hosting their matches at larger venues. On 11 January, Vendée Luçon officials announced that the club's match against Lyon would be contested at the Stade de la Beaujoire in nearby Nantes. Hours later, it was confirmed that the match between Sablé-sur-Sarthe and Paris Saint-Germain would be played at the MMArena in Le Mans.

Tie no	Home team	Score	Away team
1	Valence	0–2	Evian
2	Dijon	2–1	Istres
3	Marseille	3–1 (a.e.t.)	Le Havre
4	Limoges	0–2	Drancy
5	Sablé-sur-Sarthe	0–4	Paris Saint-Germain
6	Nice	0–0 (a.e.t.) (4–5 p)	Rennes
7	Niort	1–2	Orléans
8	Valenciennes	3–1	Bastia

Tie no	Home team	Score	Away team
9	Auxerre	1–2	Châteauroux
10	Vendée Luçon	0–2	Lyon
11	Gazélec Ajaccio	1–0	Troyes
12	Bourg-Péronnas	3–2 (a.e.t.)	Ajaccio
13	Compiègne	0–1 (a.e.t.)	Lille
14	Créteil	2–2 (a.e.t.) (3–4 p)	Bordeaux
15	Tours	0–1	Montpellier
16	Quevilly	1–0	Angers

== Round of 16 ==
The draw for the Round of 16 of the Coupe de France was held on 22 January 2012 at the headquarters of Eurosport. The round featured the 16 winners of the Round of 32. The draw was conducted by current French international Hatem Ben Arfa and former French rugby union international player Xavier Garbajosa. The matches will be played through 7–8 February 2012.

On 6 February, the French Football Federation announced that three matches would be rescheduled due to inclement weather. The Dijon–Paris Saint-Germain and Bourg-Péronnas–Marseille match was rescheduled for 15 February, while the Quevilly–Orléans will be played on 21 February.

Tie no	Home team	Score	Away team
1	Gazélec Ajaccio (3)	2–0	Drancy (4)
2	Rennes (1)	3–2	Evian (1)
3	Châteauroux (2)	0–2	Montpellier (1)
4	Dijon (1)	0–1	Paris Saint-Germain (1)

Tie no	Home team	Score	Away team
5	Lyon (1)	3–1 (a.e.t.)	Bordeaux (1)
6	Valenciennes (1)	2–1	Lille (1)
7	Quevilly (3)	2–0 (a.e.t.)	Orléans (3)
8	Marseille (1)	3–1	Bourg-Péronnas (4)

== Quarter-finals ==
The draw for the quarter-finals of the Coupe de France was held on 19 February 2012 during a television broadcast of Stade 2. The draw was conducted by French rugby union international player Julien Malzieu. The matches were contested on 20–21 March 2012.

20 March 2012	Quevilly (3)	3–2 (a.e.t.)	Marseille (1)	Caen
20:30	Valero 6'; Ayina 111', 118'	Report	Rémy 85', 113'	Stadium: Stade Michel d'Ornano; Attendance: 21,015; Referee: Jean-Charles Cailleux (Picardy)

21 March 2012	Gazélec Ajaccio (3)	1–0	Montpellier (1)	Ajaccio
17:00	Bocognano 75'	Report		Stadium: Stade François Coty; Referee: Antony Gautier (Nord-Pas-de-Calais)

21 March 2012	Valenciennes (1)	1–3	Rennes (1)	Valenciennes
19:15	Samassa 32'	Report	Pitroipa 12'; Boye 54'; Hadji 87'	Stadium: Stade du Hainaut; Attendance: 14,731; Referee: Laurent Duhamel (Normandie)

21 March 2012	Paris Saint-Germain (1)	1–3	Lyon (1)	Paris
20:50	Nenê 19' (pen.)	Report	Källström 25'; López 39'; Gomis 90+2' (pen.)	Stadium: Parc des Princes; Referee: Clément Turpin (Bourgogne)

== Semi-finals ==
The draw for the semi-finals of the Coupe de France was held on 21 March 2012. The draw was conducted by figure skater Philippe Candeloro. The matches were contested on 10–11 April 2012.

10 April 2012	Gazélec Ajaccio (3)	0–4	Lyon (1)	Ajaccio
20:45		Report	Lacazette 59'; López 73'; Grenier 80'; Gomis 90'	Stadium: Stade François Coty; Referee: Saïd Ennjimi (Centre-Ouest)

11 April 2012	Quevilly (3)	2–1	Rennes (1)	Caen
20:55	Herouat 62'; Laup 90+3'	Report	Féret 8'	Stadium: Stade Michel d'Ornano; Referee: Tony Chapron (Lower Normandy)

== Final ==
28 April 2012
20:45 CEST

Lyon	1–0	Quevilly
López 28'	Report

Stade de France, Saint-Denis
Attendance: 76,229
Referee: Hervé Piccirillo (Île-de-France)

== Media coverage ==
For the fourth consecutive season in France, France Télévisions were the free to air broadcasters while Eurosport were the subscription broadcasters.

These matches were broadcast live on French television:

Round	France Télévisions	Eurosport
Seventh Round		
Eighth Round		
Round of 64		
Round of 32		
Round of 16		
Quarter-finals		
Semi-finals		
Final		
