= List of Olympique Lyonnais players =

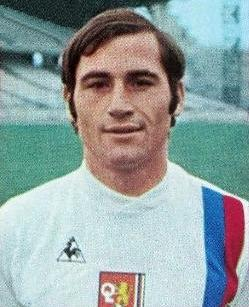
Serge Chiesa is the most capped player for Lyon with 542 games in all competitions, including 475 league appearances.

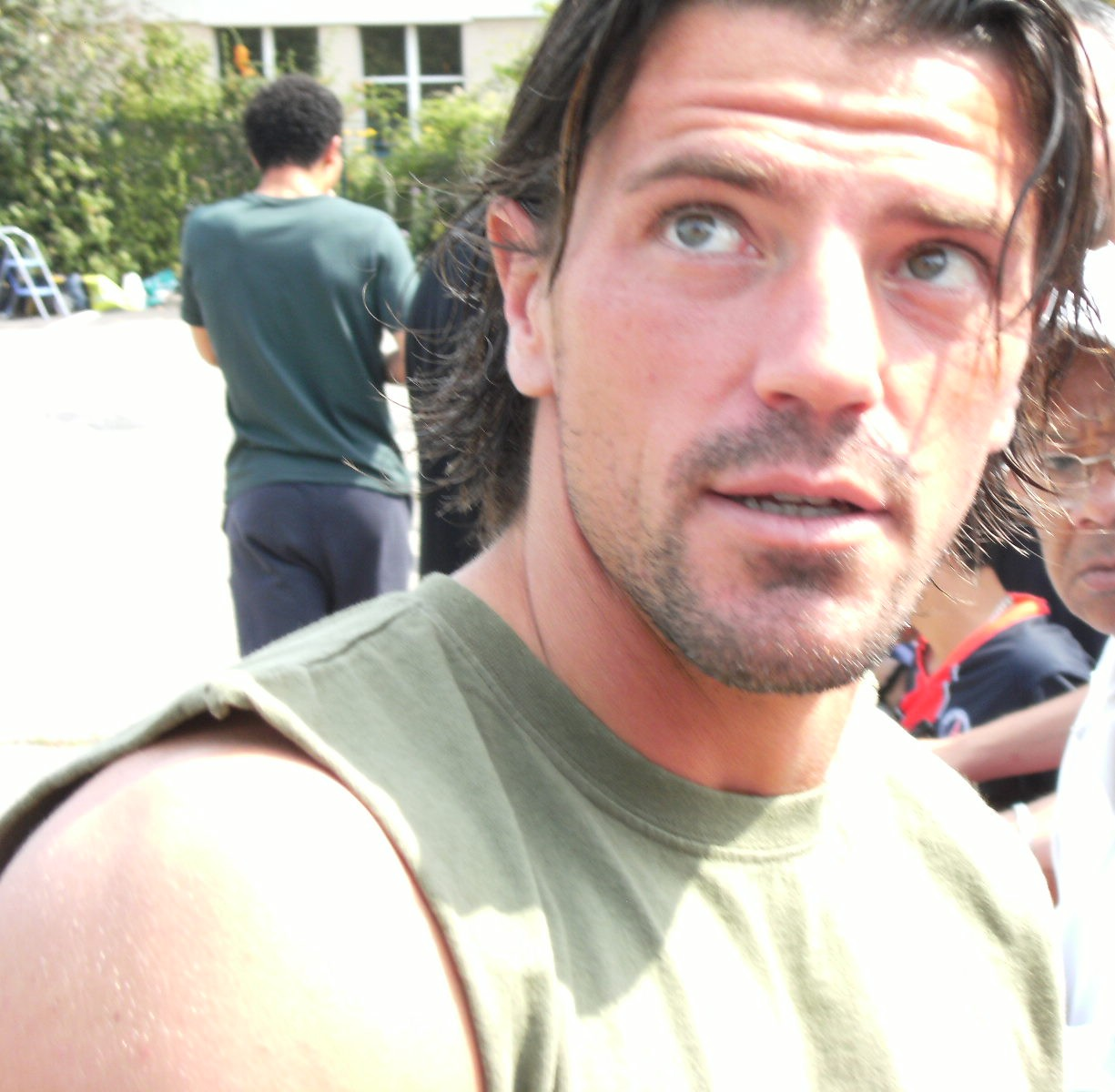
Grégory Coupet appeared in 518 matches for Lyon, second-most in the club's history.

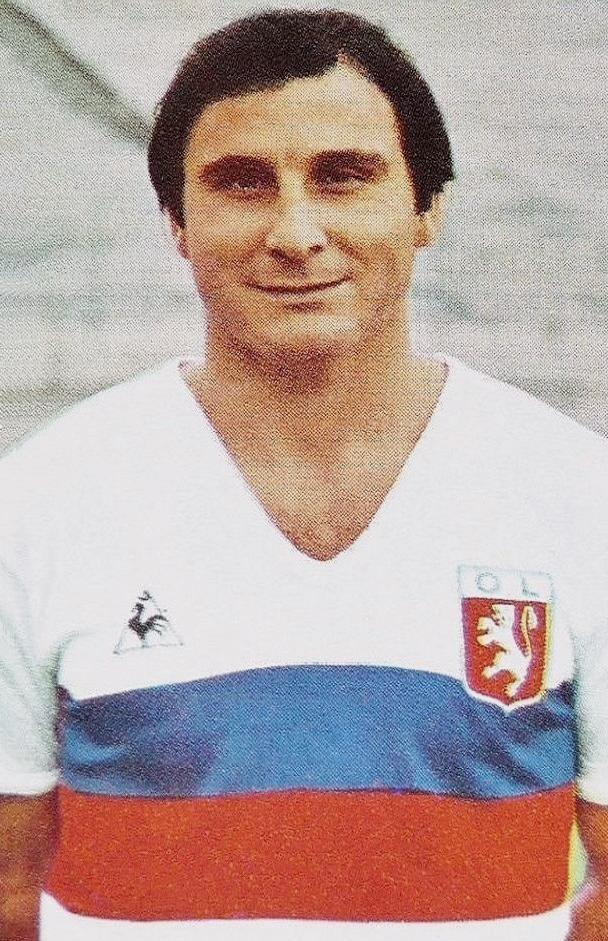
Fleury Di Nallo is Lyon's all-time top goalscorer, with 222 goals.

Olympique Lyonnais is a French professional association football club based in Lyon, Rhône-Alpes, playing in Ligue 1, the top level of the French football league system, as of the 2010–11 season. The club was formed in 1899 as the football section of sports club Lyon Olympique Universitaire. In 1950, the section split from the club and formed the club that exists today. Lyon played their first competitive match in August 1950. The club's first major honor was winning the 1963–64 edition of the Coupe de France. Lyon won their first ever Ligue 1 title in the 2001–02 season. The title started a national record-breaking streak of seven successive league championships.

Since the club played their first competitive match, more than 500 players have made a competitive first-team appearance for the club. Olympique Lyonnais' record appearance-maker is Serge Chiesa, who made 542 total competitive appearances between 1969–1983. In 1981, Chiesa surpassed Fleury Di Nallo who was the first player in the club's history to make 400 competitive appearances. Di Nallo is the club's all-time leading goalscorer with 222 and finished his career at Lyon with 495 total appearances. Only six other players have made over 400 appearances for Lyon. Goalkeepers Grégory Coupet and Yves Chauveau made 519 and 490 competitive appearances, respectively, while Sidney Govou appeared in 412. Coupet and Govou, alongside Juninho Pernambucano, are the only players to have played on all seven of the club's league-winning championship teams. Aimé Mignot is the defender with the most appearances for the club with 424 caps. Anthony Réveillère rounds out the list having made exactly 400 appearances for Lyon. Corentin Tolisso is currently the only active player with more than 300 appearances for the club.

== Key ==
=== General ===
- Appearances and goals are for first-team official competitive matches only, including Ligue 1, Ligue 2, Coupe de France, Coupe de la Ligue, Trophée des Champions, European Cup/Champions League, UEFA Cup/Europa League, and several now-defunct competitions — namely the Cup Winners' Cup, UEFA Intertoto Cup and Inter-Cities Fairs Cup matches.
- Players are listed according to the total number of games played. If two or more players are tied, their rankings are determined as follows:
1. most recently played for Lyon;
2. number of goals scored.
- Statistics are corrected as of 10 May 2026. Players marked in **bold** are still playing for the club.

=== Table headers ===
- **Name** – First name and last name.
- **Nationality** – Representative country.
- **Position** – Role on the field of play.
- **Lyon career** – Playing career at the club.
- **Appearances** – Number of games played.
- **Goals** – Number of goals scored.

=== Positions and colors ===
GK	Goalkeeper	DF	Defender	MF	Midfielder	FW	Forward

Lyon Academy graduate.

== 300+ appearances ==
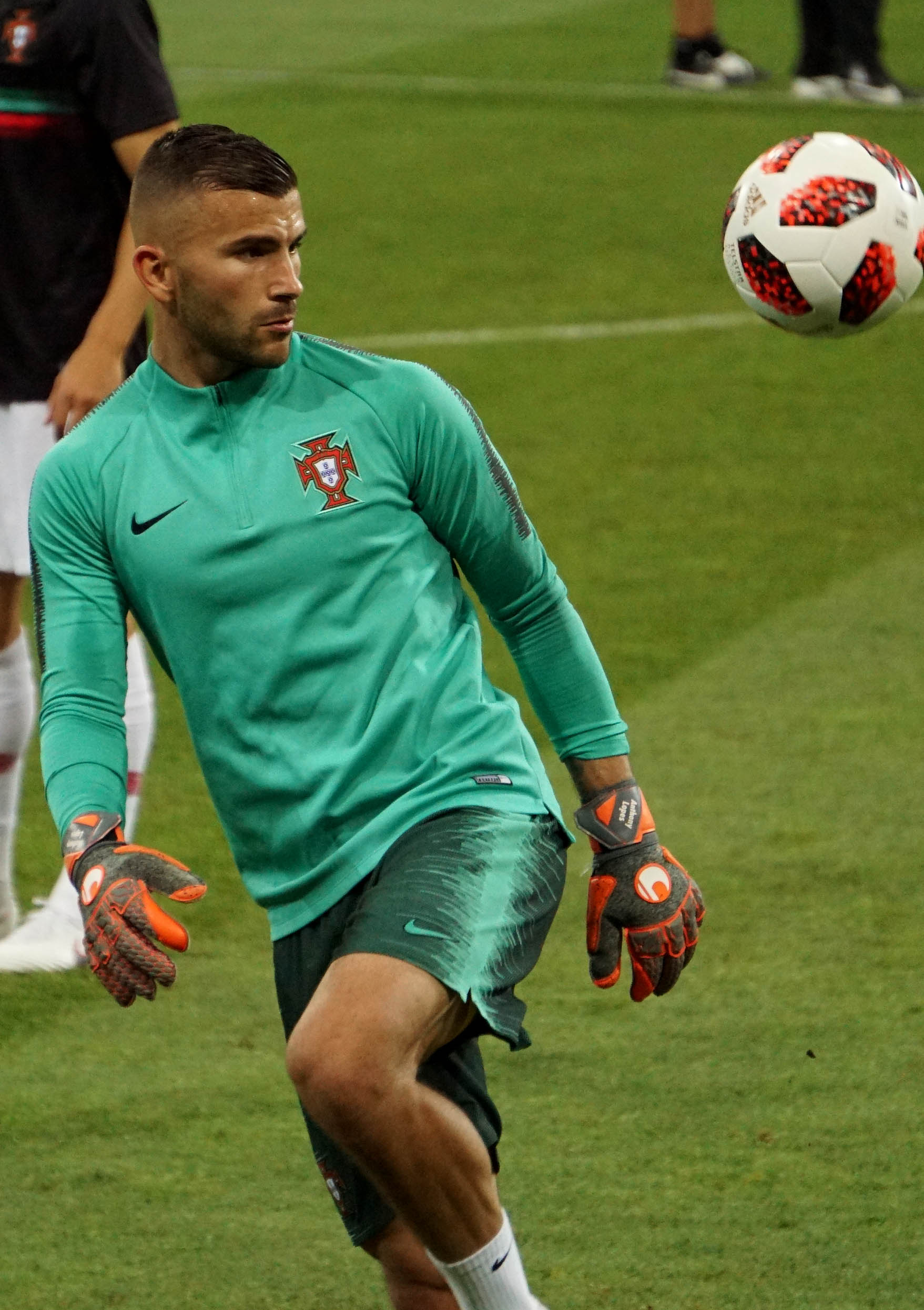
Anthony Lopes appeared in 489 matches for Lyon between 2012 and 2024.

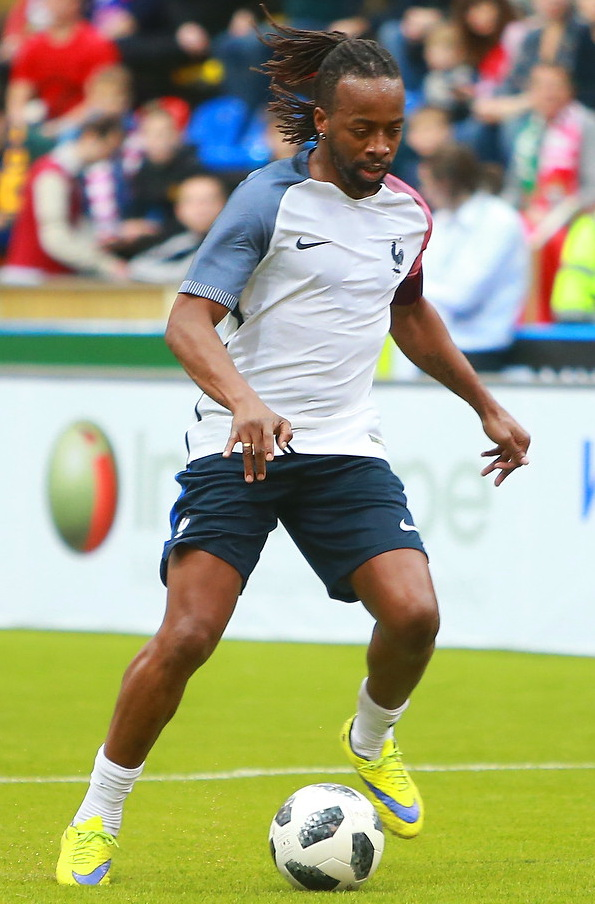
Sidney Govou spent 10 years at the club and won seven league titles.

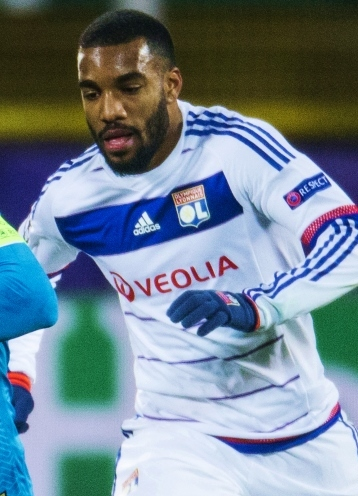
Alexandre Lacazette has scored 201 goals for Lyon, making him the club's second highest all-time goalscorer.

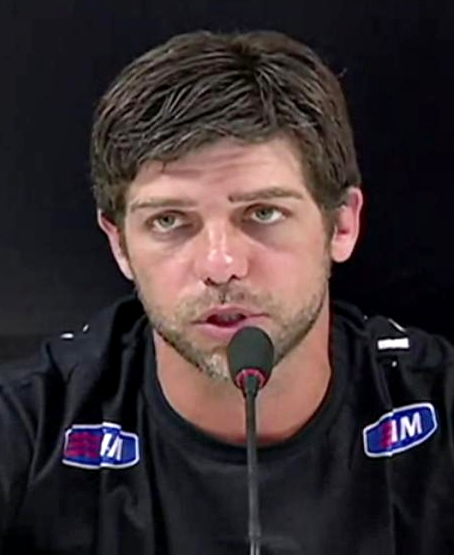
Juninho Pernambucano scored 100 goals during 8 seasons with Lyon and is considered as one of the best players in the club history.

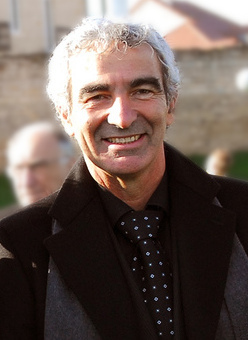
Raymond Domenech spent seven seasons at Lyon and later went on to manage the France national team.

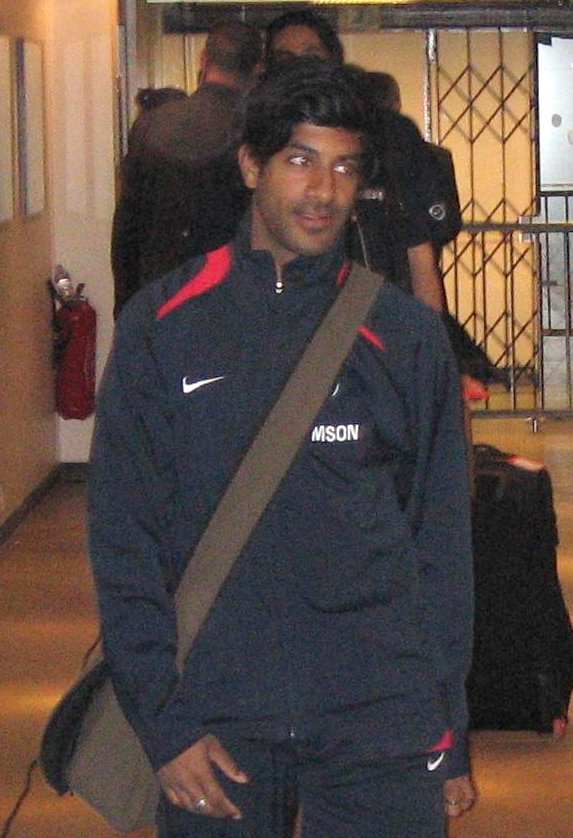
Vikash Dhorasoo had two stints at Lyon and amassed over 200 appearances.

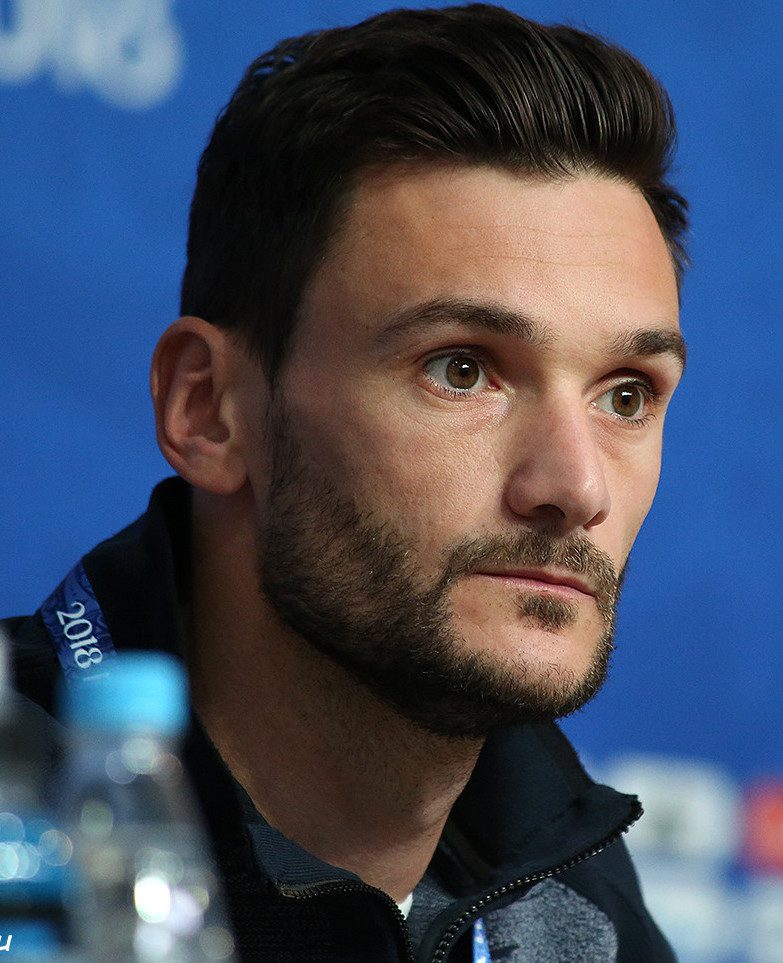
Hugo Lloris made 202 appearances for Lyon and later captained the France national team to a World Cup win in 2018.

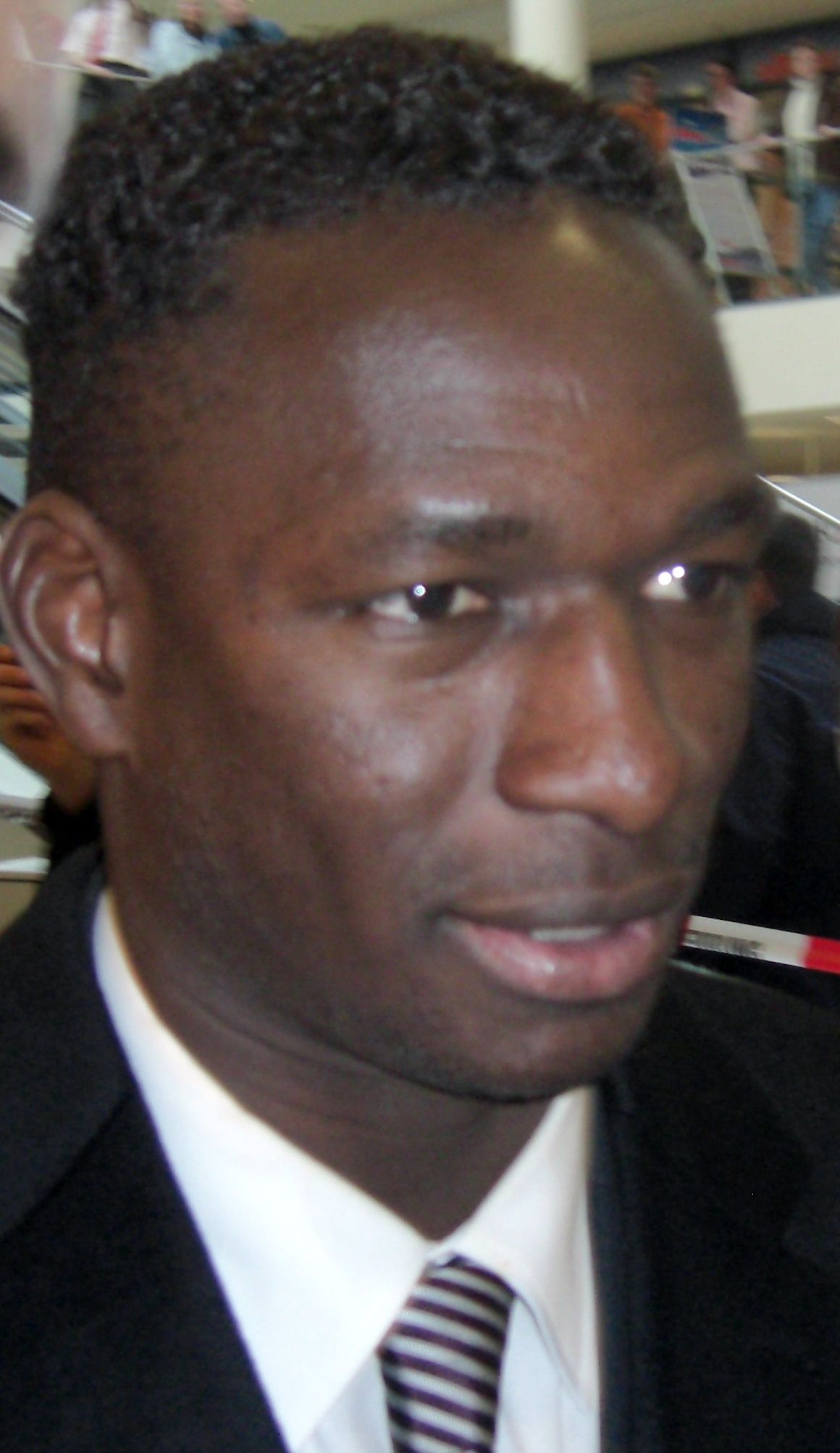
Mahamadou Diarra made 198 appearances for Lyon and captained the Mali national team.

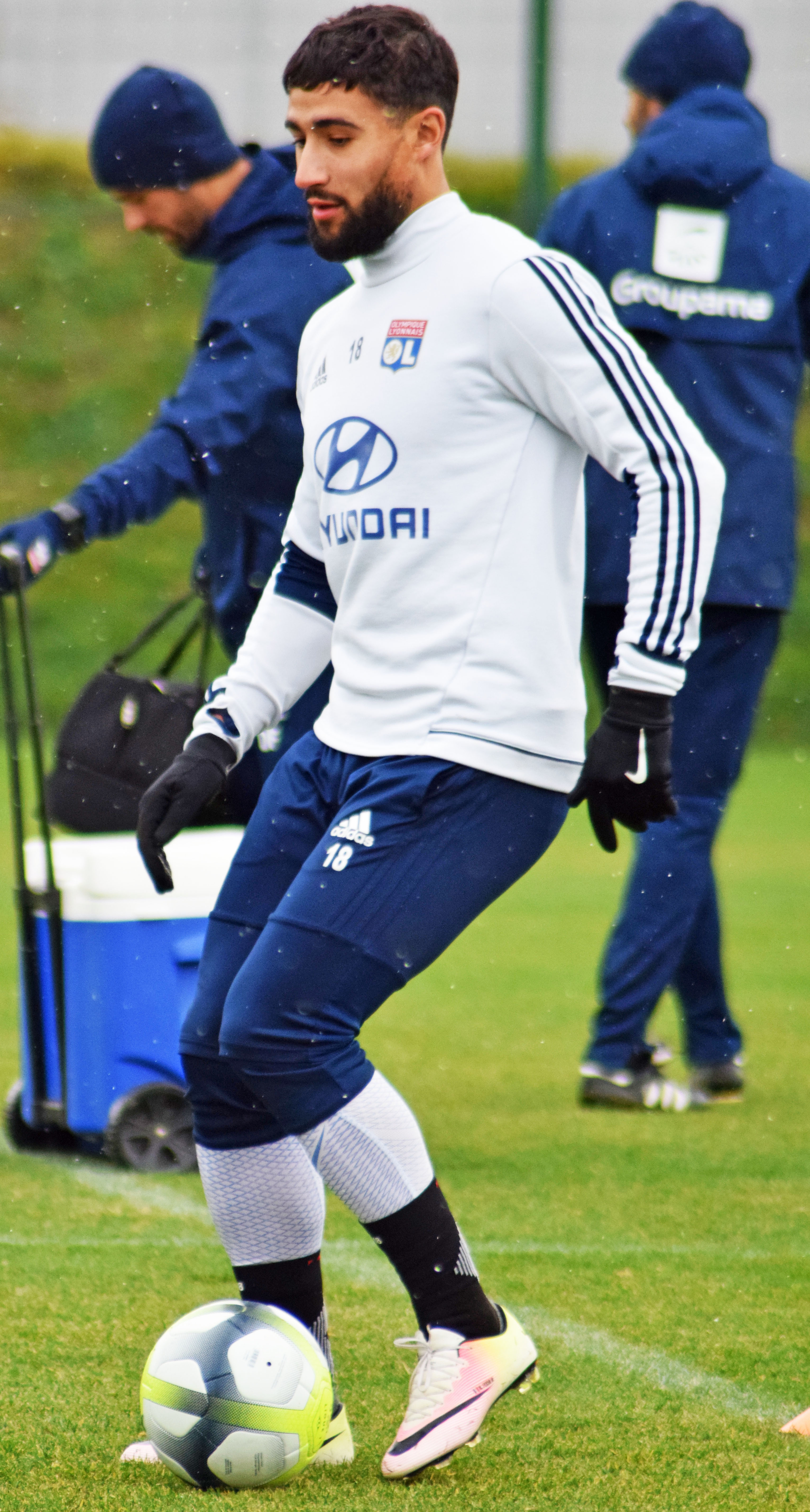
Nabil Fekir was club captain between 2017 and 2021.

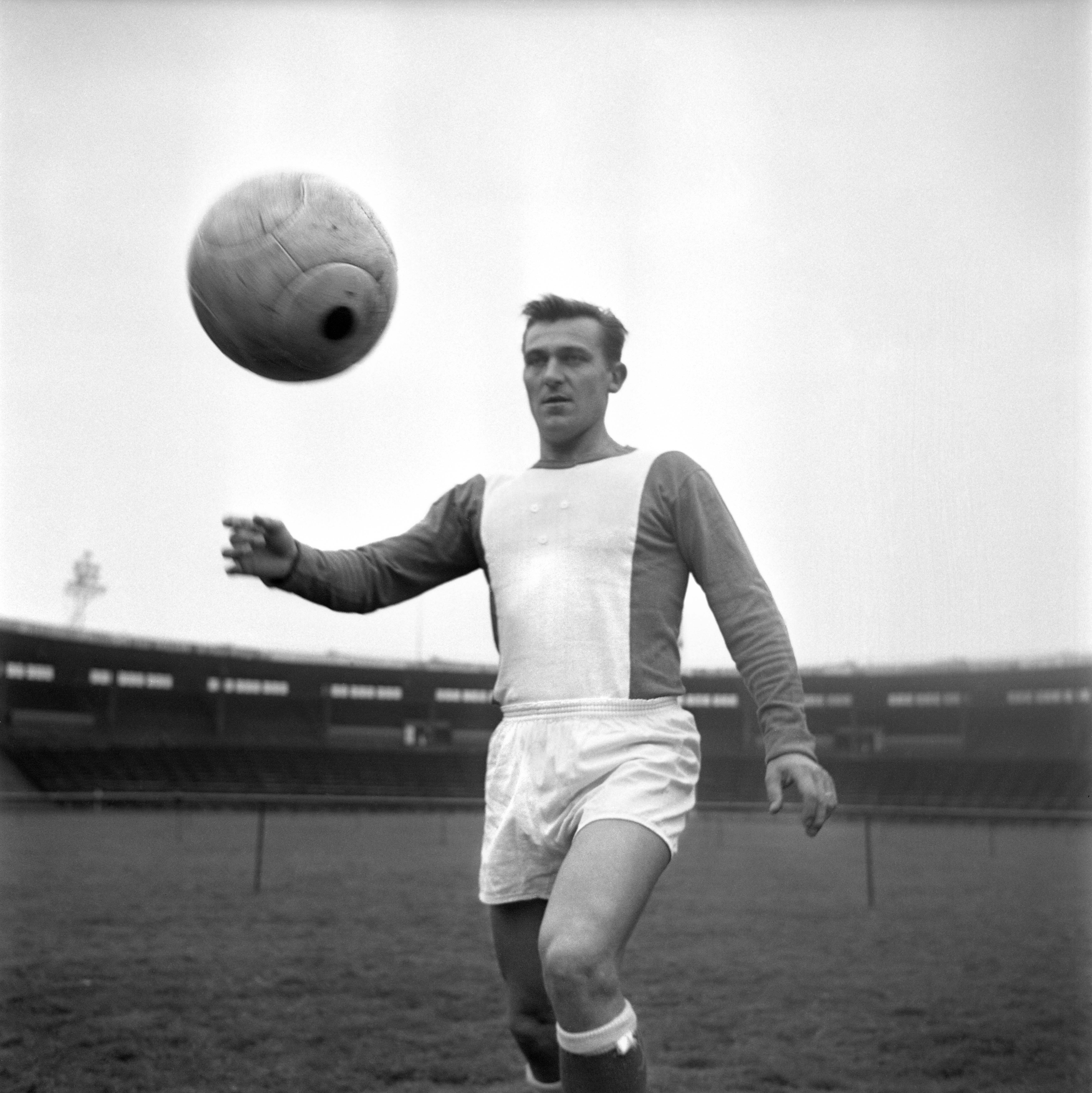
Ernest Schultz was one of the first players in Lyon history to get called up to the France national team.

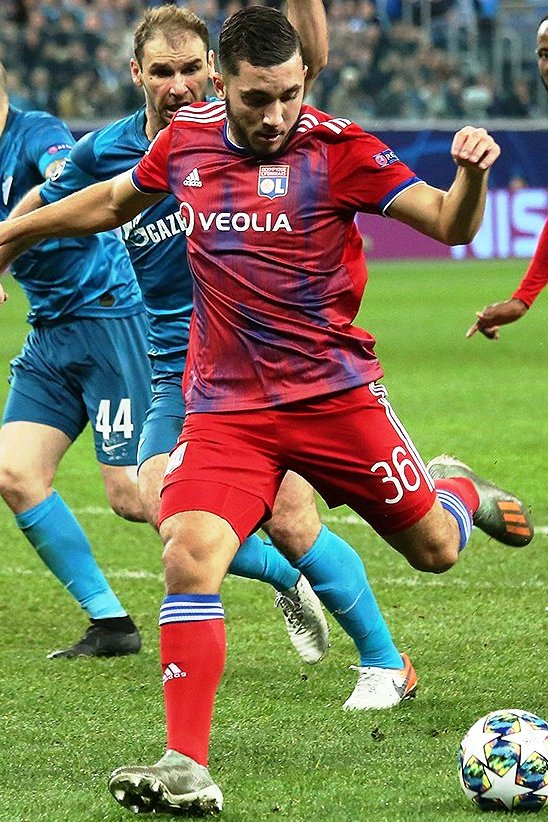
On 16 October 2021, Rayan Cherki became the youngest player to reach 50 appearances in Lyon's history, at 18 years old and 60 days.

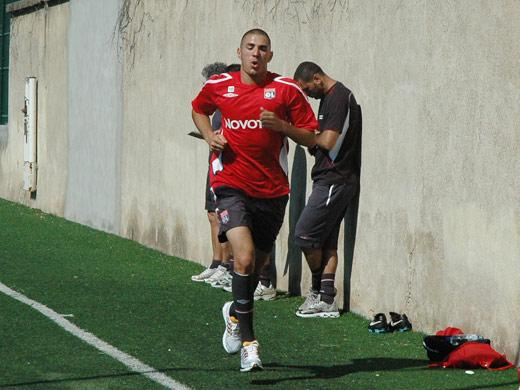
Karim Benzema, the 2022 Ballon d'Or winner, scored 66 goals in 148 appearances for Lyon.

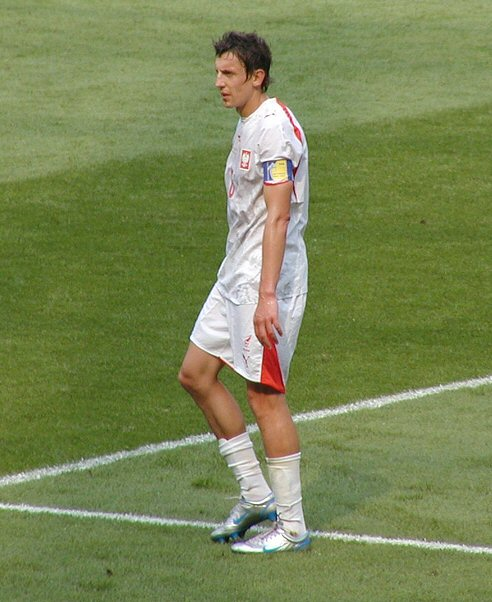
Jacek Bąk appeared in over 100 club matches.

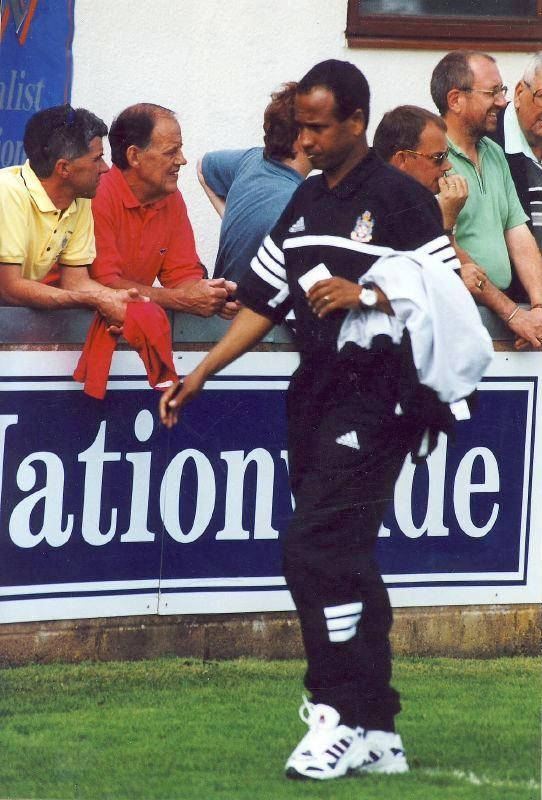
Jean Tigana spent four seasons at Lyon and later managed the club.

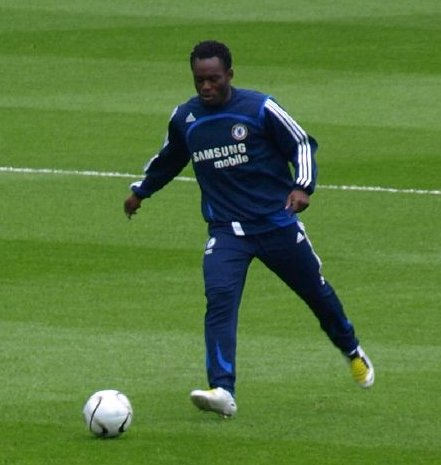
Michael Essien made 96 appearances for Lyon and is the former captain of the Ghana national team.

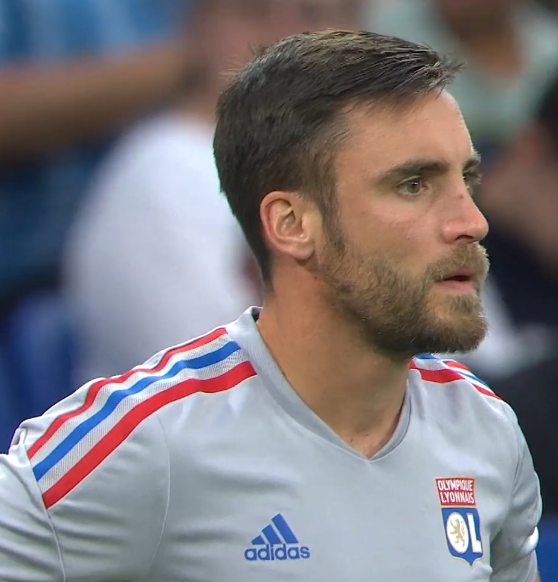
Nicolás Tagliafico won the 2022 World Cup as a Lyon player.

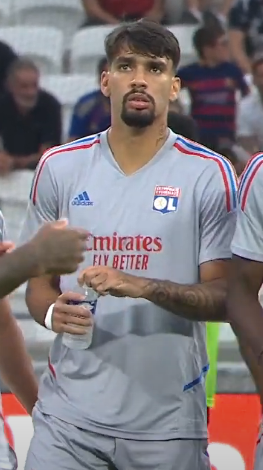
Lucas Paquetá appeared in 80 games for Lyon, scoring 21 goals.

Name	Nationality (Note: Flags indicate national team as has been defined under FIFA eligibility rules. Players may hold more than one non-FIFA nationality.)	Position	Lyon career	Appearances	Goals
Serge Chiesa	France	MF	1969–1983	542	132
Grégory Coupet	France	GK	1997–2008	519	0
Fleury Di Nallo	France	FW	1960–1974	494	222
Yves Chauveau	France	GK	1966–1975; 1978–1982	490	0
Anthony Lopes	Portugal	GK	2012–2024	489	0
Aimé Mignot	France	DF	1955–1966	425	1
Sidney Govou	France	FW	1999–2010	412	77
Anthony Réveillère	France	DF	2003–2013	400	6
Alexandre Lacazette	France	FW	2010–2017; 2022–2025	391	201
Ángel Rambert	France	MF	1960–1970	380	67
Juninho	Brazil	MF	2001–2009	344	100
Maxime Gonalons	France	MF	2009–2017	334	12
Marcel Le Borgne	France	MF	1956–1960; 1961–1969	324	8
Cris	Brazil	DF	2004–2012	310	27
Corentin Tolisso	France	MF	2013–2017; 2022–	308	57

== 200–299 appearances ==
Name	Nationality	Position	Lyon career	Appearances	Goals
Bernard Lhomme	France	DF	1966–1976	294	4
Lucien Degeorges	France	DF	1960–1969	294	8
Raymond Domenech	France	DF	1970–1977	293	11
Alain Olio	France	DF	1976–1984; 1985–1986	290	14
Camille Ninel	France	MF	1950–1961	283	7
Kim Källström	Sweden	MF	2006–2012	281	22
Ljubomir Mihajlović	Serbia	DF	1970–1977	279	2
Philippe Violeau	France	MF	1997–2004	269	11
Florent Laville	France	DF	1993–2003	268	4
Pascal Fugier	France	DF	1985–1993	261	5
Laurent Fournier	France	MF	1980–1988	261	28
Bernard Lacombe	France	FW	1969–1978	258	149
Bruno Ngotty	France	DF	1987–1995	256	13
Maxwel Cornet	Ivory Coast	FW	2015–2021	252	51
André Lerond	France	DF	1951–1959	246	3
Bafétimbi Gomis	France	FW	2009–2014	244	95
Steed Malbranque	France	MF	1997–2001; 2012–2016	238	19
Houssem Aouar	Algeria	MF	2017–2023	233	41
André Ferri	France	MF	1980–1987	229	13
Vikash Dhorasoo	France	MF	1993–1998; 2002–2004	224	13
Christophe Delmotte	France	MF	1997–2004	222	16
Daniel Ravier	France	MF	1969–1974	222	21
Patrick Müller	Switzerland	DF	2000–2004; 2006–2008	220	7
Jordan Ferri	France	MF	2011–2019	213	12
Jérémy Toulalan	France	MF	2006–2011	210	1
David Linarès	France	DF	1996–2002	206	5
Slobodan Topalović	Serbia	GK	1981–1987	203	0
Sylvain Deplace	France	DF	1991–1997	203	4
Hugo Lloris	France	GK	2008–2012	202	0
Robert Cacchioni	Italy	DF	1970–1977	202	5

== 100–199 appearances ==
Name	Nationality	Position	Lyon career	Appearances	Goals
Mahamadou Diarra	Mali	MF	2002–2006	198	14
Thadée Polak	France	DF	1961–1967	195	3
Nabil Fekir	France	FW	2013–2019	193	69
Florent Malouda	France	MF	2003–2007	193	33
Jean Djorkaeff	France	DF	1957–1966	193	23
Jean Baeza	France	DF	1969–1974	192	12
Rayan Cherki	France	FW	2019–2025	185	28
Maxence Caqueret	France	MF	2018–2025	184	7
Marcel Aubour	France	GK	1960–1966	184	0
Émile Antonio	France	MF	1954–1961	183	23
Joël Fréchet	France	MF	1981–1982; 1983–1989	179	17
Memphis Depay	Netherlands	FW	2017–2021	178	76
Ernest Schultz	France	FW	1952–1957	176	91
Moussa Dembélé	France	FW	2018–2023	172	70
Marcel Nowak	France	DF	1953–1957; 1962–1963	171	12
Samuel Umtiti	France	DF	2011–2016	170	5
Jérémie Bréchet	France	DF	1998–2003	169	0
Bruno Génésio	France	MF	1984–1987; 1988–1993; 1994–1995	169	11
Lisandro López	Argentina	FW	2009–2013	168	82
Sima Nikolić	Bosnia and Herzegovina	FW	1980–1985	168	78
Marcelo	Brazil	DF	2017–2021	167	8
Lucas Tousart	France	MF	2015–2020	165	6
Stéphane Roche	France	MF	1988–1992; 1993–1996; 1997–1998	164	24
Nestor Combin	France	FW	1959–1964	164	94
Rémi Garde	France	MF	1984–1993	162	23
Jimmy Briand	France	FW	2010–2014	160	34
Sonny Anderson	Brazil	FW	1999–2003	160	94
André Perrin	France	FW	1966–1967; 1968–1971	159	25
Edmilson	Brazil	MF	2000–2004	157	5
Franck Gava	France	MF	1992–1997	157	29
Jacek Bąk	Poland	DF	1995–2002	154	7
Clément Grenier	France	MF	2009–2018	152	18
Gilbert Bonvin	France	DF	1951–1955	151	6
Robert Mouynet	France	DF	1955–1959	149	5
Karim Benzema	France	FW	2004–2009	148	66
Jean-François Jodar	France	DF	1975–1979	148	5
Pascal Olmeta	France	GK	1993–1997	146	0
Thiago Mendes	Brazil	MF	2019–2023	143	2
Georges Prost	France	MF	1965–1973	143	9
Michel Bastos	Brazil	MF	2009–2013	142	35
Florian Maurice	France	FW	1992–1997	142	51
Bakary Koné	Burkina Faso	DF	2011–2016	141	8
Guy Hatchi	France	MF	1961–1965	140	16
Rafael	Brazil	DF	2015–2020	139	2
Jérémy Morel	Madagascar	DF	2015–2019	139	1
Jason Denayer	Belgium	DF	2018–2022	137	8
Alain Caveglia	France	FW	1996–2000	137	61
Yves Mariot	France	FW	1973–1977	137	20
Aly Cissokho	France	DF	2009–2013	136	2
Ali Bouafia	Algeria	FW	1988–1992	135	26
Dejan Lovren	Croatia	DF	2010–2013; 2023–2024	134	4
Nicolás Tagliafico	Argentina	DF	2022–	132	9
Rachid Ghezzal	Algeria	FW	2012–2017; 2025–	131	14
Robert Nouzaret	France	MF	1963–1969	130	2
Léo Dubois	France	DF	2018–2022	129	5
Ludovic Giuly	France	FW	1994–1998	129	32
Marcelo Djian	Brazil	DF	1993–1998	129	1
André Guy	France	FW	1967–1971	129	76
Yoann Gourcuff	France	MF	2010–2015	128	19
Éric Roy	France	MF	1993–1996	128	12
Dominique Marais	France	DF	1976–1981	127	2
Peguy Luyindula	France	FW	2001–2004	126	46
Eric Deflandre	Belgium	DF	2000–2004	126	0
Robert Valette	France	DF	1969–1976	126	5
Fred	Brazil	FW	2005–2009	125	43
Bertrand Traoré	Burkina Faso	FW	2017–2020	123	33
Émile Daniel	France	FW	1961–1965	123	16
René Bocchi	France	MF	1956–1957; 1958–1961	123	10
Miralem Pjanić	Bosnia and Herzegovina	MF	2008–2011	121	16
Patrice Carteron	France	DF	1997–2000	120	10
Clinton Mata	Angola	DF	2023–	116	0
Romarin Billong	Cameroon	DF	1989–1995	115	5
Ainsley Maitland-Niles	England	DF	2023–	114	5
Karl Toko Ekambi	Cameroon	FW	2020–2023	114	38
Ederson	Brazil	MF	2008–2012	114	11
François Clerc	France	DF	2004–2010	114	2
Sylvain Wiltord	France	FW	2004–2007	114	32
Eric Carrière	France	FW	2001–2004	114	16
François Lemasson	France	GK	1987–1990	114	0
Henri Zambelli	France	DF	1982–1985	114	6
Patrick Paillot	France	DF	1975–1980	114	0
Christophe Cocard	France	MF	1996–1999	113	14
Franck Durix	France	MF	1982–1988	113	33
Jacques Glyczinski	France	DF	1963–1969	113	3
Rémy Vercoutre	France	GK	2002–2014	112	0
Cláudio Caçapa	Brazil	DF	2000–2007	112	7
Cédric Bardon	France	FW	1994–1998	112	15
Jean-Paul Bernad	France	MF	1972–1978	112	20
Hector Maison	Argentina	MF	1966–1969	112	9
Tanguy Ndombele	France	MF	2017–2019; 2022	111	5
Jean-Jacques Nono	Cameroon	MF	1983–1988	111	7
Jean Tigana	France	MF	1978–1981	111	17
Claude Hugues	France	GK	1957–1958; 1959–1962	111	0
Ghislain Anselmini	France	DF	1991–1993; 1994–1998	109	0
Éric Boucher	France	DF	1983–1986	108	0
Pierre Laigle	France	MF	1999–2002	107	11
Ildo Maneiro	Uruguay	MF	1973–1976	106	18
Jean Makoun	Cameroon	MF	2008–2010	105	12
Eric Abidal	France	DF	2004–2007	105	2
Gueïda Fofana	France	MF	2011–2015	104	9
Jean-Luc Sassus	France	DF	1994–1997	104	2
Gilles Rousset	France	GK	1990–1993	104	0
Lucien Cossou	France	FW	1956–1959	103	47
Henri Bedimo	Cameroon	DF	2013–2016	103	1
Milan Bisevac	Serbia	DF	2012–2015	103	1
Jean-Pierre Knayer	France	MF	1953–1957	102	4
César Delgado	Argentina	MF	2008–2011	101	9
Tiago Mendes	Portugal	MF	2005–2007	101	14
Christophe Desbouillons	France	DF	1976–1981	101	5
Jacky Colin	France	MF	1988–1991	100	11

== 50–99 appearances ==
Name	Nationality	Position	Lyon career	Appearances	Goals
Jérémy Berthod	France	DF	2003–2007	99	2
Tony Vairelles	France	FW	1999–2001; 2001–2002; 2002–2003	98	22
Daniel Xuereb	France	FW	1977–1981	98	21
Gilles De Rocco	France	GK	1975–1979	98	0
Pierre Beetschen	Switzerland	GK	1955–1960; 1961-1967	98	0
Jacques Fatton	Switzerland	FW	1954–1957	98	43
Eugène Kabongo	Democratic Republic of the Congo	FW	1987–1990	97	65
Michael Essien	Ghana	MF	2003–2005	96	13
Michel Maillard	France	FW	1971–1976	96	34
Marcel Duval	France	GK	1950–1955	94	0
Laurent Lassagne	France	DF	1988–1992	93	0
Éric Spadiny	France	FW	1981–1986	93	22
Christophe Jallet	France	DF	2014–2017	92	4
Hatem Ben Arfa	France	MF	2004–2008	92	12
Laurent Delamontagne	France	FW	1992–1995	92	7
Constantinho Pirès	Brazil	MF	1956–1959	92	17
Mouhamadou Dabo	France	DF	2011–2015	91	1
Mathieu Bodmer	France	MF	2007–2010	91	8
Marc-Vivien Foé	Cameroon	MF	2000–2002	91	8
Jean-Alain Boumsong	France	DF	2008–2010	89	4
Laurent Debrosse	France	DF	1992–1995	89	2
Jean-Marc Knapp	France	DF	1988–1992	89	0
Sébastien Squillaci	France	DF	2006–2008	87	3
Sinaly Diomandé	Ivory Coast	DF	2020–2024	85	0
Milan Grobarcik	France	DF	1959–1961	85	1
Moussa Niakhaté	Senegal	DF	2024–	84	1
Arnold Mvuemba	Democratic Republic of the Congo	MF	2012–2016	83	3
Jean-Marc Chanelet	France	DF	2000–2003	83	3
Mario Corian	France	DF	1987–1991	83	1
Jean-Pierre Orts	France	FW	1986–1988	83	50
Robert Salen	France	FW	1955–1960; 1961-1962	82	18
Hubert Fournier	France	DF	1998–2000	81	0
Claude-Arnaud Rivenet	France	MF	1991–1996	81	5
Jean-Marc Furlan	France	DF	1980–1982	81	1
Lucas Paquetá	Brazil	MF	2020–2022	80	21
Kenny Tete	Netherlands	DF	2017–2020	80	1
James Debbah	Liberia	FW	1992–1995	80	18
Daniel Lubin	France	FW	1979–1983	80	11
René Rocco	France	MF	1966–1968	80	1
Ferland Mendy	France	DF	2017–2019	79	3
Raymond Dutto	France	DF	1951–1961	79	0
Malick Fofana	Belgium	FW	2024–	77	17
Martin Terrier	France	FW	2018–2020	77	17
Fabio Grosso	Italy	DF	2007–2009	77	2
Tanner Tessmann	United States	MF	2024–	76	3
Mathieu Valbuena	France	MF	2015–2017	76	12
Fernando Marçal	Brazil	DF	2017–2020	75	0
Jean-Christophe Devaux	France	DF	1994–2000	75	1
Guy Garrigues	France	DF	1975–1979	75	0
Jean-Jacques N'Domba	Republic of the Congo	FW	1986–1988	74	15
Abdelhamid Kermali	Algeria	DF	1954–1959	74	17
Sergi Darder	Spain	MF	2015–2017	73	5
Alain Moizan	France	MF	1980–1982	73	11
Erik Kuld Jensen	Denmark	FW	1953–1955	73	26
Mapou Yanga-Mbiwa	France	DF	2015–2020	72	2
Abdul Kader Keïta	Ivory Coast	FW	2007–2009	72	8
Cédric Uras	France	DF	1997–2000	72	0
Raymond Schwinn	France	MF	1966–1968	72	3
Bruno Guimarães	Brazil	MF	2020–2022	71	3
Manuel Amoros	France	DF	1993–1995	70	4
Antoine Jurilli	France	DF	1950–1953	70	1
Albert Emon	France	FW	1981–1983	69	19
Ernest Nuamah	Ghana	FW	2023–	68	9
Castello Lukeba	France	DF	2021–2023	68	4
Frédéric Zago	France	DF	1987–1989	68	15
Franck Priou	France	FW	1986–1988	68	23
Philippe N'Dioro	Cameroon	FW	1980–1984	68	18
Jean Gallice	France	FW	1977–1979	68	12
Karim Maroc	Algeria	FW	1976–1979; 1980–1981	67	17
Henri Lewandowicz	France	FW	1957–1959	67	22
Claudio García	Argentina	FW	1988–1990	66	16
Yves Flohic	France	MF	1967–1970	66	0
Georges Dupraz	France	FW	1950–1952	66	32
Jean-Louis Rivoire	France	FW	1959–1965	65	9
Tino Kadewere	Zimbabwe	FW	2020–2024	64	11
Dobrivoje Trivić	Serbia	MF	1971–1973	64	5
Alphonse Rolland	France	FW	1950–1952	64	14
Jean-Marc Valadier	France	FW	1978–1980	63	15
Antoine Dalla Cieca	France	MF	1958–1960	63	12
Abner Vinícius	Brazil	DF	2024–	62	7
Saël Kumbedi	France	DF	2022–2025	62	0
Guillaume Masson	France	FW	1990–1993	62	6
Philippe Vargoz	France	DF	1980–1984	62	0
Henri Alberto	Italy	GK	1954–1956	62	0
Malo Gusto	France	DF	2021–2023	61	0
Samassi Abou	France	FW	1992–1996	61	4
Alexandre Bès	Ivory Coast	DF	1989–1994	60	0
Aziz Bouderbala	Morocco	MF	1990–1992	60	11
Joël Müller	France	DF	1979–1981	60	1
Michel Margottin	France	FW	1964–1966	60	8
Christian Bassila	France	DF	1996–1999	59	2
Jean-Marc Martinez	France	MF	1977–1980	59	6
Guy Genet	France	DF	1976–1980	59	5
Roger Duffez	France	DF	1960–1964	59	0
Bernard Roubaud	France	MF	1960–1962	59	9
Eugène N'Jo Léa	Cameroon	FW	1959–1961	59	29
Frédéric Woelh	France	FW	1950–1952	59	12
Nemanja Matić	Serbia	MF	2024–2025	58	1
Christophe Deguerville	France	DF	1995–1997	58	1
José Pasqualetti	France	FW	1982–1984	57	4
Erwin Kuffer	Luxembourg	DF	1966–1969	57	0
Marcel Lergenmuller	France	GK	1950–1952	57	0
Duje Ćaleta-Car	Croatia	DF	2023–	56	1
Jérémy Pied	France	DF	2010–2012	56	4
Maxence Flachez	France	DF	1992–1995	56	2
Rajko Aleksić	Serbia	DF	1977–1979	56	2
Mouctar Diakhaby	Guinea	DF	2016–2018	55	7
Frédéric Kanouté	Mali	FW	1997–2000	55	11
Ake Hjalmarsson	Sweden	MF	1953–1955	55	24
John Carew	Norway	FW	2005–2007	54	17
Yassine Benzia	Algeria	FW	2012–2015	54	6
Jérémy Clément	France	MF	2004–2006	54	1
Christophe Breton	France	GK	1985–1989; 1991-1997	54	0
Steve Marlet	France	FW	2000–2002	53	19
Joseph-Désiré Job	Cameroon	FW	1997–1999	53	18
Émile Jullard	France	MF	1950–1952	53	5
Albert Domenech	France	DF	1971–1975	52	1
Ján Popluhár	Slovakia	DF	1968–1970	52	1
Lucien Genet	France	FW	1951–1955	52	15
Pierre-Alain Frau	France	FW	2004–2005	51	9
Mohamed Lekkak	Algeria	FW	1959–1964	51	18
Kaj Christiansen	Denmark	FW	1952–1954	51	15
Yannick Bajeot	France	DF	1986–1988	50	3
Olivier Rouyer	France	FW	1980–1984	50	12
Stéphane Bruey	France	FW	1964–1966	50	12
Michel Bossy	France	MF	1959–1964	50	0
François Konrady	France	MF	1953–1957	50	10

== 30–49 appearances ==
Name	Nationality	Position	Lyon career	Appearances	Goals
Georges Mikautadze	Georgia	FW	2024–2025	49	18
Lucas Perri	Brazil	GK	2024–2025	49	0
Jean Dumas	France	MF	1963–1966	49	15
Jeff Reine-Adélaïde	France	MF	2019–2023	48	2
Mariano Díaz	Dominican Republic	FW	2017–2018	48	22
Bryan Bergougnoux	France	FW	2001–2005	48	6
Bradley Barcola	France	FW	2021–2023	47	7
Antonín Tichý	Czech Republic	MF	1950–1953	47	5
Nilmar	Brazil	FW	2004–2005	46	7
Serge Blanc	France	DF	1998–2001	46	4
Miloš Bursać	Serbia	FW	1990–1992	46	7
Patrice Cabanel	France	DF	1987–1989	46	1
Jean Camilla	France	MF	1960–1963; 1965–1966	46	0
Henrique	Brazil	DF	2021–2024	45	1
René Ramon	France	FW	1954–1956	45	15
Giora Spiegel	Israel	FW	1976–1978	44	9
José Broissart	France	MF	1976–1978	44	5
Gérard Moresco	France	FW	1956–1959	44	17
Tyler Morton	England	MF	2025–	43	2
Clinton Njie	Cameroon	FW	2012–2015	43	8
Giovane Élber	Brazil	FW	2003–2005	43	17
Claude Robin	France	DF	1986–1987	43	0
Jean-Louis Desvignes	France	MF	1981–1983	43	0
Alfonso Fernandez	Belgium	MF	1991–1993	42	3
Jean-François Domergue	France	MF	1982–1983	42	9
Gilbert Ravanello	France	DF	1969–1972	42	0
François Félix	France	FW	1968–1971	42	11
Jacky Pin	France	MF	1966–1968	42	7
Éric Assadourian	Armenia	FW	1995–1996	41	3
Thomas Remark	Germany	FW	1986–1987	41	12
Lucien Farmanian	France	MF	1954–1956	41	4
Johann Lepenant	France	MF	2022–2025	40	1
Pascal Havet	France	DF	1986–1988	40	0
Bernard Boissier	France	DF	1981–1982	40	1
Michel Valke	Netherlands	MF	1987–1988	39	5
Robert Traba	France	FW	1964–1966	39	11
Jordan Veretout	France	MF	2024–2025	38	2
Frédéric Née	France	FW	2001–2003	38	6
Jaime Solas	Spain	DF	1959–1961	38	0
Pavel Šulc	Czech Republic	MF	2025–	37	14
Islam Slimani	Algeria	FW	2021–2022	37	8
Pombolo Sadi Wa	Democratic Republic of the Congo	FW	1985–1987	37	11
Jacques Philip	France	DF	1983–1986	37	0
Alexandre Viala	France	DF	1960–1964	37	0
Afonso Moreira	Portugal	FW	2025–	36	8
Saïd Benrahma	Algeria	FW	2024–2025	36	6
Emerson Palmieri	Italy	DF	2021–2022	36	1
Frédéric Patouillard	France	DF	1995–1997	36	2
Philippe Millot	France	DF	1982–1983	36	1
Alain Thiry	France	DF	1964–1976	36	1
Jérôme Boateng	Germany	DF	2021–2023	35	0
Joachim Andersen	Denmark	DF	2019–2021	35	2
Michel Zewulko	France	GK	1966–1968	35	0
Pierre Flamion	France	FW	1951–1952	35	5
Andrex Calligaris	Italy	DF	1950–1952	35	5
Adam Karabec	Czech Republic	MF	2025–	34	3
Dominik Greif	Slovakia	GK	2025–	34	0
Milan Baroš	Czech Republic	FW	2007–2008	34	7
Laurent Casanova	France	MF	1995–1997	34	1
Alain Baré	France	FW	1989–1991	34	3
Laurent Sevcenko	France	FW	1984–1988	34	5
Patrick Baldassara	France	DF	1972–1978	34	2
Jean-Pierre Teisseire	France	DF	1965–1966	34	1
René Monnet	France	MF	1935–1958	34	2
Mattia De Sciglio	Italy	DF	2020–2021	33	0
Hervé Goursat	France	DF	1985–1987	33	5
Khalis Merah	France	MF	2025–	32	1
Jake O'Brien	Ireland	DF	2023–2024	32	5
Frédéric Fouret	France	FW	1995–1998	32	4
Jules Sbroglia	France	DF	1959–1960	32	0
Zbigniew Misiaszek	France	MF	1952–1954	32	0
André Grillon	France	DF	1951–1952	32	2
Jacques Grimonpon	France	DF	1950–1951	32	0
Miguel Lopes	Portugal	DF	2013–2014	31	0
Marco Grassi	Switzerland	FW	1998–1999	31	8
Abedi Pelé	Ghana	MF	1993–1994	31	3
Jean-Pierre Cappon	France	MF	1952–1954	31	6
Sauveur Rodriguez	France	DF	1951–1952	31	1
Tetê	Brazil	FW	2022–2023	30	8
Benoît Pedretti	France	MF	2005–2006	30	2
Miodrag Živaljević	Serbia	FW	1979–1980	30	8
