= 1976 Coupe de France final =

Football match

- Event: 1975–76 Coupe de France
Marseille	Lyon
2	0
- Date: 12 June 1976
- Venue: Parc des Princes, Paris
- Referee: Robert Wurtz
- Attendance: 45,661

The 1976 Coupe de France final was a football match held at Parc des Princes, Paris on 12 June 1976. Olympique de Marseille defeated Olympique Lyonnais 2–0 thanks to goals by Raoul Noguès and Saar Boubacar.

== Match details ==
12 June 1976

Marseille	2–0	Lyon
Noguès 67'; Boubacar 84'

Parc des Princes, Paris
Attendance: 45,661
Referee: Robert Wurtz

'
GK	(France) Gérard Migeon
DF	(France) Jacques Lemée
DF	(France) Marius Trésor	(c)
DF	(France) Victor Zvunka
DF	(France) François Bracci
MF	(France) Robert Buigues
MF	(France) Jean Fernandez
MF	(Senegal) Boubacar Sarr
MF	(Argentina) Raoul Noguès	(substituted off) 88'
FW	(Argentina) Hector Yazalde
FW	(France) Georges Bereta
Substitutes:
MF	(France) Jean-Marc Martinez	(substituted in) 88'
Manager:
(France) Jules Zvunka Assistant Referees: Fourth Official:

GK
DF
DF
DF
DF
MF
MF
MF
MF
FW
FW
Substitutes:
MF
Manager:
(France) Aimé Mignot

(France) Gilles De Rocco
(France) Guy Garrigues
(Socialist Federal Republic of Yugoslavia) Ljubomir Mihajlović
(France) Jean-François Jodar
(France) Raymond Domenech	(c)
(Italy) Roberto Cacchioni
(Uruguay) Ildo Maneiro	(substituted off) 74'
(France) Serge Chiesa
(France) Bernard Lacombe
(France) Jean-Paul Bernad
(France) Bernard Ferrigno
(France) Robert Valette	(substituted in) 74'

== See also ==
- Coupe de France 1975-76
