= Pierre-Étienne Lemaire =

French footballer (born 1991)

Personal information
- Full name: Pierre-Étienne Lemaire
- Date of birth: 25 January 1991 (age 35)
- Place of birth: Tours, France
- Height: 1.80 m (5 ft 11 in)
- Position: Right back

Senior career*
Years	Team	Apps	(Gls)
2011–2015	Angers	11	(1)
2013–2014	→ Le Poiré-sur-Vie (loan)	22	(0)
2015–2017	CA Bastia	59	(0)
2017–2018	FC Villefranche	8	(0)
2022-	Ain Sud		
- * Club domestic league appearances and goals as of July 2022

Pierre-Étienne Lemaire (born 25 January 1991) is a French professional footballer who currently plays as a defender for Championnat National 1 side FC Villefranche. He previously played for Angers, making his debut for the club in the 2–2 draw with Sedan on 16 March 2012. He becomes a player of Ain Sud from 2022.
