= Alexandre Lacazette =

French footballer (born 1991)

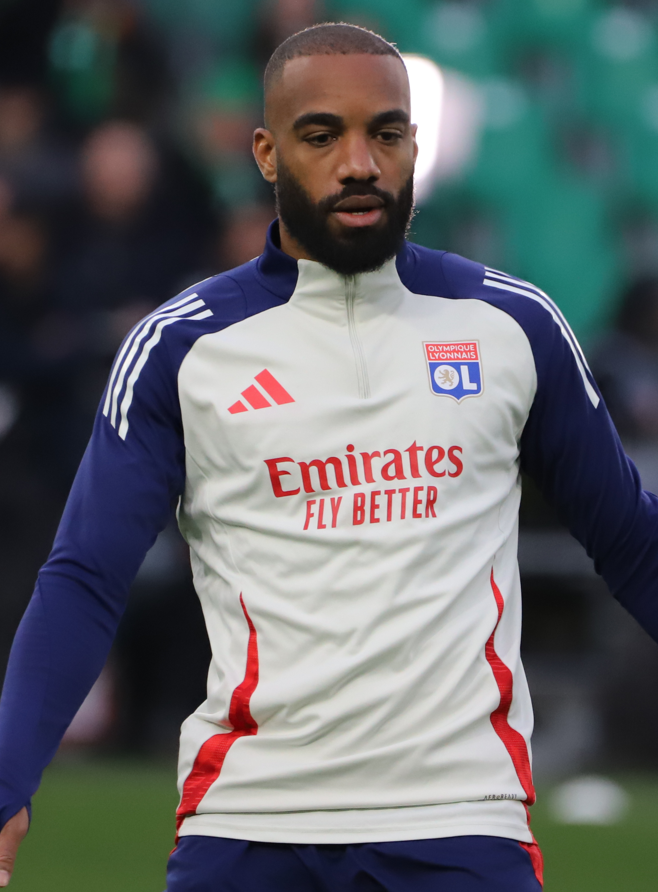
- Lacazette with Lyon in 2025

Personal information
- Full name: Alexandre Armand Lacazette
- Date of birth: 28 May 1991 (age 35)
- Place of birth: Lyon, France
- Height: 1.75 m (5 ft 9 in)
- Position: Striker

Team information
- Current team: Neom
- Number: 91

Youth career
- 1998–2003: ELCS Lyon
- 2003–2008: Lyon

Senior career*
Years	Team	Apps	(Gls)
2008–2011	Lyon B	53	(23)
2010–2017	Lyon	203	(100)
2017–2022	Arsenal	158	(54)
2022–2025	Lyon	94	(61)
2025–	Neom	44	(18)

International career
2006–2007	France U16	4	(0)
2007–2008	France U17	11	(1)
2008–2009	France U18	10	(1)
2009–2010	France U19	10	(4)
2010–2011	France U20	12	(9)
2011–2012	France U21	11	(5)
2024	France Olympic	8	(3)
2013–2017	France	16	(3)
Medal record
Men's football
Representing France
Olympic Games
Silver medal – second place	Paris 2024	Team
UEFA European Under-19 Championship
Winner	2010
UEFA European Under-17 Championship
Runner-up	2008
- * Club domestic league appearances and goals as of 17:55, 30 October 2026 (UTC)

Alexandre Armand Lacazette (French pronunciation: [alɛksɑ̃dʁ(ə) lakazɛt]; born 28 May 1991) is a French professional footballer who plays as a striker for and captains Saudi Pro League club Neom.

Lacazette began his senior career with hometown club Lyon in 2010, at age 19. Initially a wide forward, he was converted into a striker, and finished as Ligue 1 top goalscorer and won Ligue 1 Player of the Year in the 2014–15 season. In 2017, Lacazette was the subject of a then-club record association football transfer when he signed for Arsenal in a transfer worth up to £46.5 million (€53 million), with whom he won the FA Cup in 2020 and reached the 2019 UEFA Europa League final. In 2022, Lacazette returned to Lyon on a free transfer, and became the club's second-highest all-time top goalscorer.

Lacazette made his debut for the senior side of the France national team in 2013, after he represented his nation across all youth levels. Lacazette was a key contributor in France's victory in the 2010 UEFA European Under-19 Championship, where he scored the match-winning goal in the final against Spain. He recorded three goals in sixteen appearances. As an over-age player, Lacazette captained France in the 2024 Olympics and won the silver medal.

== Early life ==
Alexandre Armand Lacazette was born on 28 May 1991 in Lyon, to a family of Guadeloupean origin.

He was the youngest of four boys. One of his brothers, Benoît, played football in the Swiss second division and French fourth division. His cousin, Romuald, is also a footballer.

== Club career ==
=== Lyon ===
Upon his arrival at the club, Lacazette began training at the Centre Tola Vologe, the club's training centre. While undergoing training, he was likened to former Lyon striker Sonny Anderson by many coaches, including the player himself. As a youth player, Lacazette played in the club's under-18 team that finished in third place in the Championnat National des moins de 18 ans during the 2007–08 season. The following season, he began making appearances for the club's Championnat de France Amateur (CFA) reserve team, scoring five goals in 19 CFA matches. In the 2009–10 season, Lacazette scored 12 goals in 22 appearances in the CFA.

==== 2009–11: Development and breakthrough ====
During the second half of the 2009–10 Ligue 1 season, he was called up to the first team by manager Claude Puel and appeared on the bench in the team's 1–0 victory over Montpellier on 2 May 2010. Three days later, Lacazette made his first team debut in a Ligue 1 home match against Auxerre. On 3 July 2010, Lacazette signed his first professional contract agreeing to a three-year deal. Due to still having another year left on his aspirant (youth) contract, the contract would start on 1 July 2011.

Lacazette's successful campaign in the 2010 UEFA European Under-19 Championship saw the player draw interest from Italian club Roma. He also drew praise from the media, alongside international teammates Yannis Tafer and Clément Grenier, for his dedication to the club after playing in the pre-season 2010 Emirates Cup match a 2-2 draw against Celtic, hours after playing in the final of the 2010 UEFA European Under-19 Championship. Lacazette began the 2010–11 season training full-time with the first team. He scored six goals in 12 2010–11 CFA matches for the club's reserve team. He scored his first competitive goal for the first team on 30 October in a Ligue 1 home match against Sochaux. His goal in the 69th minute gave Lyon a 2–1 lead, which would be the final score. Three days later, Lacazette made his European club competition debut against the Portuguese club Benfica in a 2010–11 UEFA Champions League Group B away match, appearing as a substitute in the second half with Lyon trailing 4–0. Minutes after coming onto the pitch, he assisted Lyon's opening goal, scored by Yoann Gourcuff in the 75th minute. He also assisted Lyon's second goal, scored by Bafétimbi Gomis in the 85th minute. Lyon, however, were unable to complete the comeback, losing 4–3. On 7 December, Lacazette scored the first European club competition goal of his career in Lyon's final Group B match, the 88th-minute equaliser in the 2–2 home draw against Israeli club Hapoel Tel Aviv.

==== 2011–16: Rise to stardom and Golden Boot win ====
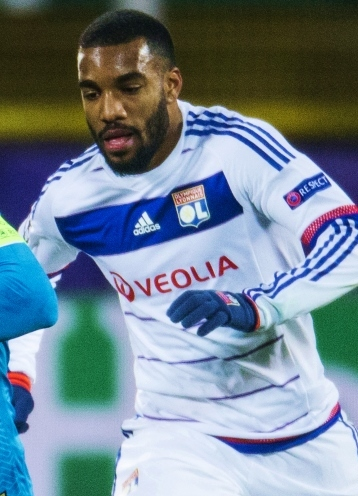
Lacazette playing for Lyon in 2015

Lacazette scored Lyon's only goal in the 2014 Coupe de la Ligue final against Paris Saint-Germain; however his side lost 2–1.

In September 2014, Lacazette signed a two-year extension to his contract, tying him to the club until 2018. He scored his first hat-trick on 5 October 2014, scoring all the goals in a 3–0 Ligue 1 home win over Lille. On 26 April 2015, Lacazette broke the Lyon record for Ligue 1 or Division 1 goals scored in a single season with his 26th in a Ligue 1 4–2 away victory over Reims; André Guy had scored a total of 25 Division 1 goals in the 1968–69 season. He finished the 2014–15 Ligue 1 season as the top scorer in Ligue 1, scoring a total of 27 goals. Lacazette completed an outstanding season by being voted Ligue 1 Player of the Year for the 2014–15 season.

Amid transfer speculation from a number of Premier League clubs such as Arsenal following his break-out season, on 8 August 2015, Lacazette signed a new deal, extending his contract with Lyon until 2019. On 8 November 2015, he scored all of the goals in a 3–0 Ligue 1 home win over local arch-rivals Saint-Étienne. On 9 January 2016, he scored the first goal at the newly opened Parc Olympique Lyonnais, in a 4–1 win over Troyes in a Ligue 1 match.

==== 2016–17: Final season at Lyon ====
On 29 October 2016, Lacazette scored two goals in Lyon's 2–1 away win against Toulouse in Ligue 1 to register his 100th and 101st goals in all competitions for Lyon, overtaking Juninho Pernambucano (who scored 100 goals in 350 competitive matches for Lyon) to become the fourth-most prolific scorer in Lyon's history. On 22 November, he scored the only goal by slotting home Rafael's rolled cross from close range in the 72nd minute of the 2016–17 UEFA Champions League group stage Group H matchday 5 1–0 away win against Dinamo Zagreb to keep alive Lyon's hopes of progressing to the knockout phase of the 2016–17 UEFA Champions League.

In early February 2017, Lacazette reportedly revealed to television show Canal Football Club his intention to leave Olympique Lyonnais in the summer of 2017. On 10 February, Jean-Michel Aulas, the club's president, denied that Lacazette had asked to leave that summer and said that Lacazette's comments were taken out of context by the media.

=== Arsenal ===
In May 2017, it was reported that a verbal arrangement had been reached for Lacazette to join Atlético Madrid in the summer of 2017, but that fell through on 1 June 2017, after the Court of Arbitration for Sport upheld Atlético's ban on registering players for two transfer windows (1 January – 2 February 2017 and 1 June – 31 August 2017) that was imposed in July 2016 by FIFA on the club for breaching FIFA rules over the signing of minors.

On 5 July 2017, Lacazette signed a reported five-year deal for Premier League club Arsenal for a club record fee; Lyon disclosed that the fee was an initial €53 million (£46.5 million) plus up to €7 million (£6.1 million) in potential bonuses. The fee was the largest ever received by Lyon from the sale of a player, beating the €41.5 million (£37.7 million) record set by Corentin Tolisso's transfer to Bayern Munich three weeks earlier. The transfer fee also surpassed the previous Arsenal record €50 million (£42.5 million) that Arsenal paid Real Madrid for Mesut Özil in 2013. Lacazette was given the number 9 jersey.

==== 2017–18: Debut campaign ====
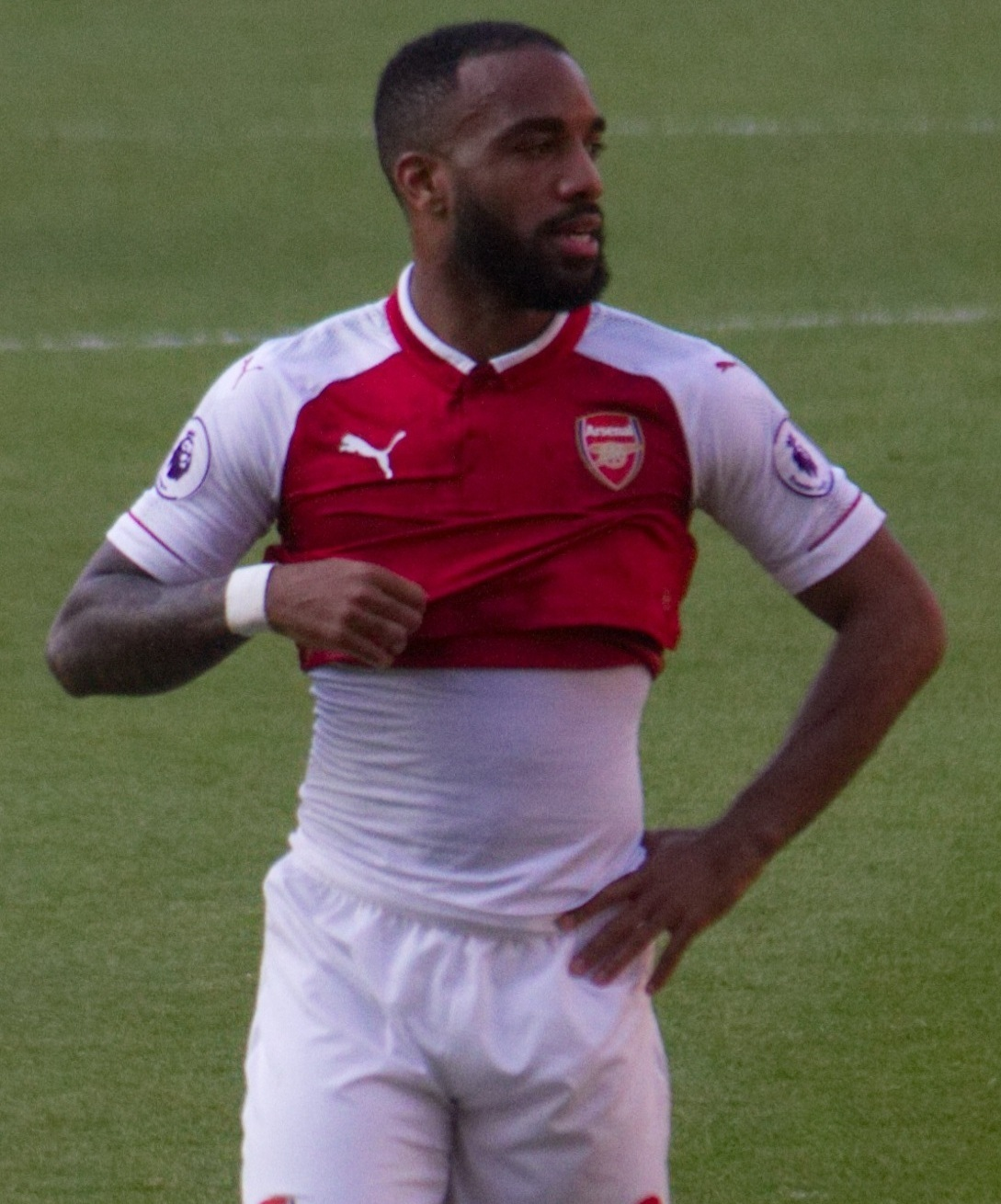
Lacazette playing for Arsenal in 2018

On 6 August 2017, Lacazette made his first appearance for Arsenal in the 2017 FA Community Shield against Chelsea. Despite hitting the post midway through the first half, Arsenal eventually won 4–1 on penalties after the game ended 1–1 at full time. This win constituted his first trophy win at Arsenal. On 11 August, Lacazette made his Premier League debut against Leicester City and scored after 94 seconds to give Arsenal a 1–0 lead in an eventual 4–3 win. Lacazette also managed to score in both of Arsenal's next home games, scoring Arsenal's second in a 3–0 win over Bournemouth, before grabbing a brace for the club in a 2–0 win over West Bromwich Albion. With his goals against West Brom, Lacazette became the first Arsenal player to score in his first three home league appearances for the club since Brian Marwood in September 1988.

Lacazette scored his first away goal for Arsenal, in the team's 5–2 win against Everton at Goodison Park, latching onto a pass from Mesut Özil, to score Arsenal's third. Lacazette claimed his sixth goal of the season in Arsenal's 3–1 away defeat to Manchester City after latching onto an Aaron Ramsey pass, despite not starting the game. In November, Lacazette scored Arsenal's opening goal in a 5–0 rout of Huddersfield Town and in December, he scored Arsenal's only goal in a 3–1 home defeat to Manchester United.

Following a protracted period on the sidelines through injury, Lacazette returned to the Arsenal squad in the 3–0 home win over Stoke City in March, where he replaced Danny Welbeck in the 61st minute and scored the Gunners' third goal of the game, after new signing and designated penalty-taker Pierre-Emerick Aubameyang, allowed Lacazette to take the penalty. Lacazette would then score twice on his Europa League debut for Arsenal, in a 4–1 win against CSKA Moscow, marking his first goal in European competition for the club. Lacazette then registered his third goal in European football for Arsenal, by scoring in the Europa League semi-final 1–1 draw with Atlético Madrid. The goal was Lacazette's seventh goal in seven games for the club since returning from injury. Lacazette scored in Arsène Wenger's final home match, a 5–0 rout of Burnley, the team's second goal and his fourteenth league goal of the season, Lacazette also picked up an assist for the team's opening goal as well.

==== 2018–22: Arsenal Player of the Season, FA Cup win, captainship and departure ====
After the departure of manager Arsène Wenger, Lacazette found himself dropped to the bench under new manager Unai Emery, making substitute appearances against Manchester City, Chelsea and West Ham United. Lacazette made his first start under Emery in Arsenal's 3–2 away win over Cardiff City on 2 September, where he registered an assist and scored his first goal of the season. On 1 April 2019, Lacazette scored Arsenal's second goal in a 2–0 win over Newcastle United, which sent Arsenal into third place and two points clear of rivals Tottenham Hotspur, Chelsea and Manchester United. The goal marked Lacazette's thirteenth goal of the season in the Premier League. On 3 May 2019, Lacazette was voted by Arsenal supporters as the club's player of the season.

Lacazette scored his first goal of the 2019–20 season in Arsenal's home opener, a 2–1 victory against Burnley on 17 August 2019. On 1 August 2020, Lacazette was selected to start in the 2020 FA Cup final against Chelsea, as Arsenal won their 14th FA Cup.

Lacazette scored Arsenal's first league goal of the 2020–21 season in a 3–0 victory against Fulham on 12 September 2020. He scored three goals in three league starts in September and was voted as the runner up of the Player of the Month on Arsenal official website. On 14 March 2021, Lacazette scored the winning goal in a 2–1 win against Tottenham Hotspur in North London derby, becoming the first Arsenal player to score in three consecutive home league games against their North London rival since 2008. On 11 April, he scored his 50th Premier League goal in a 3–0 win over Sheffield United. With 13 goals, he finished the season as Arsenal's highest goalscorer in the Premier League.

On 3 June 2022, Arsenal announced that Lacazette would leave the club following the expiration of his contract on 30 June.

=== Return to Lyon ===
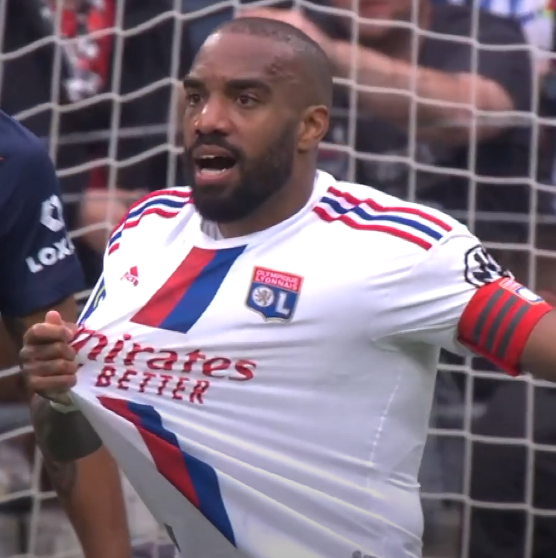
Lacazette playing for Lyon in 2023

On 9 June 2022, Lacazette returned to Lyon, signing a three-year contract with the club. He scored his first goal of his second stint with the club from the penalty spot against Ajaccio in a 2–1 home win on 5 August 2022. On 10 March 2023, Lacazette scored a late-match brace in a 3–3 draw against Lille, becoming the joint second-highest goalscorer in Lyon's history, tied with Bernard Lacombe at 149 goals. Six days later, he netted in a 1–1 draw against Nantes, his 150th goal with the club to make him the sole second-highest scorer in club history, behind Fleury Di Nallo with 222 goals. On 7 May, he scored four goals in a 5–4 win against Montpellier including game-winning last minute penalty, three of his goals were assisted by teammate Bradley Barcola.

Lacazette played his final game for Lyon on 17 May 2025 where he scored a brace in a 2–0 victory over Angers, scoring both his 200th and 201st goals for the club.

=== Neom SC ===
Lacazette joined Saudi Pro League club Neom SC on a two-year deal on 1 July 2025. Later that year, on 14 September, he netted his first goals by netting a brace in a 2–1 away win over Damac.

== International career ==
=== Youth ===
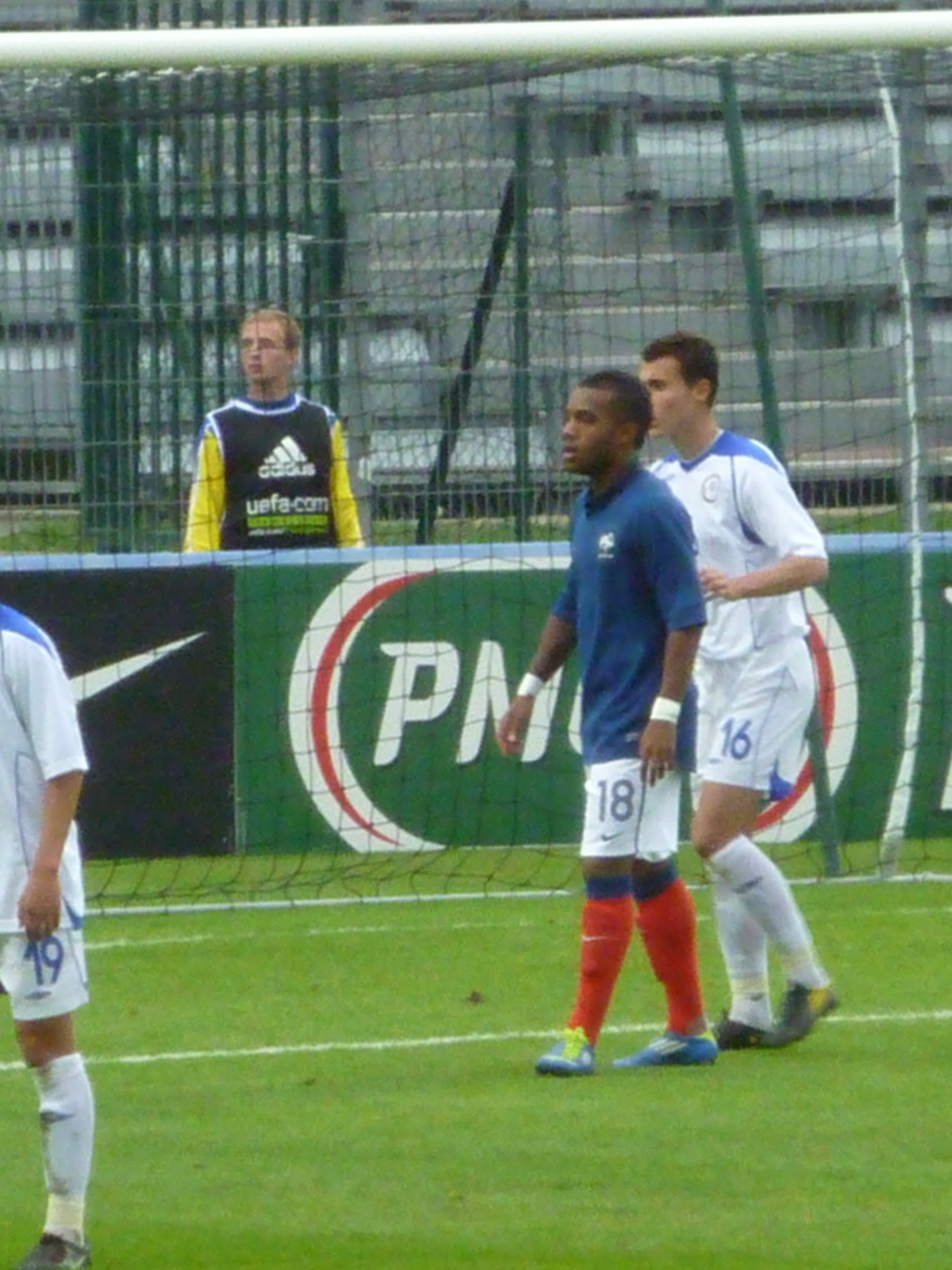
Lacazette playing for France U21 in 2011

Lacazette has featured for all of France's national youth teams beginning with the under-16 team making his debut in the team's 2–0 victory over Cameroon on 3 April 2007 at the Montaigu Tournament. He finished the campaign with four appearances in the tournament. With the under-17 team, Lacazette was a regular and contributed to the team's qualification for the 2008 UEFA European Under-17 Championship. In the competition, he scored the game-winning goal in the team's 2–1 win over the Republic of Ireland in the group stage. France later reached the final where the team was defeated 4–0 by Spain.

With the under-18 team, Lacazette made his debut in the team's match against Ukraine. He featured in ten of the eleven matches the team contested scoring one goal, which came against Denmark in the Tournoi de Limoges. For under-19 duty, Lacazette was again called upon by coach Francis Smerecki, making his first appearance for the team in a 4–2 defeat against Netherlands on 9 November 2009. He scored his first goal for the team on 4 March 2010 in a 2–1 win against Ukraine. On 7 June 2010, Lacazette was named to coach Smerecki's 18-man squad to participate in the 2010 UEFA European Under-19 Championship. In the tournament, he scored two goals in the team's 5–0 Group A victory over Austria. France later reached the final where they faced Spain, which was essentially composed of the same players that defeated France in the 2008 UEFA European Under-17 Championship final. In the match, France came back from a goal down to win 2–1 with Lacazette netting the game-winning goal in the 85th minute after heading in a cross from Gaël Kakuta. France thus secured their second UEFA European Under-19 championship title.

Due to France's victory at the 2010 UEFA European Under-19 championship, the nation qualified for the 2011 FIFA U-20 World Cup. This resulted in Lacazette making appearances for the under-20 team. He made his under-20 team debut on 7 October 2010 in a friendly match against Portugal. The match ended 3–3 with Lacazette scoring the opening goal of the match. Three days later, Lacazette scored a double in the team's 5–0 thrashing of the Juventus Primavera team. The match was unofficial and was contested as part of the celebration of the Treaty of Turin. On 9 February 2011, Lacazette scored the game-winning goal in a 2–1 victory over England. In March 2011, Lacazette scored goals in back-to-back matches against Peru.

On 10 June 2011, he was named to the 21-man squad to participate in the 2011 FIFA U-20 World Cup finals. He made his debut in the competition in France's first Group A match on 30 July 2011 against the host nation Colombia (France lost the match 4–1), appearing as a substitute. In the team's next Group A match against South Korea, Lacazette appeared as a substitute again and scored the final goal (in second-half injury time) of the match, which France won 3–1. He scored one goal in France's final Group A match, 2–0 win over Mali. Lacazette scored twice in the quarterfinal win over Nigeria and one goal in the third place match against Mexico. He finished as the tournament's joint top scorer with 5 goals, along with Henrique Almeida and Álvaro Vázquez.

=== Senior ===
On 23 May 2013, Lacazette received his first call-up to the senior squad following the withdrawal of Jérémy Ménez through injury. He made his international debut on 5 June, as a 58th-minute substitute for Olivier Giroud in a 0–1 friendly defeat against Uruguay at the Estadio Centenario in Montevideo. Lacazette scored his first international goal on 29 March 2015, opening a 2–0 friendly win over Denmark at the Stade Geoffroy-Guichard in Saint-Étienne. During the match, he was booed by some of the local supporters due to their rivalry with Lyon. On 14 November 2017, Lacazette netted a brace for France during a friendly away to Germany in an eventual 2–2 draw.

On 17 May 2018, he was named on the standby list for the 23-man French squad for the 2018 World Cup in Russia.

He was named as one of the players to represent France during the 2024 Olympics held in Paris and was also designated the team's captain. He had played as one of the permitted overage players in the French under-23 team (who represent France in the Olympics), during the lead-up to the tournament against the Dominican Republic in an international friendly.

== Style of play ==
Lacazette previously played as a winger for Lyon, before becoming a striker. As well as goalscoring and finishing ability, characteristics of his game are strength, balance, technique, dribbling, link-up play, and ability with either foot. He is also a hard-working player, who presses the opposition and wins the ball back using his defensive skills and tackling ability. Fellow Frenchman Gérard Houllier said in July 2017 that Lacazette "is a bit like" former Arsenal striker Ian Wright.

== Career statistics ==
=== Club ===
As of match played 20 October 2026

Appearances and goals by club, season and competition
Club	Season	League			National cup (Note: Includes Coupe de France, FA Cup, King's Cup)		League cup (Note: Includes Coupe de la Ligue, EFL Cup)		Continental		Other		Total	
Club	Season	Division	Apps	Goals	Apps	Goals	Apps	Goals	Apps	Goals	Apps	Goals	Apps	Goals
Lyon B	2008–09	CFA	19	5	—		—		—		—		19	5
Lyon B	2009–10	CFA	22	12	—		—		—		—		22	12
Lyon B	2010–11	CFA	12	6	—		—		—		—		12	6
Lyon B	Total		53	23	—		—		—		—		53	23
Lyon	2009–10	Ligue 1	1	0	0	0	0	0	0	0	—		1	0
Lyon	2010–11	Ligue 1	9	1	0	0	0	0	2 (Note: Appearances in UEFA Champions League)	1	—		11	2
Lyon	2011–12	Ligue 1	29	5	4	2	4	2	6	1	—		43	10
Lyon	2012–13	Ligue 1	31	3	0	0	0	0	5 (Note: Appearances in UEFA Europa League)	1	1 (Note: Appearance in Trophée des Champions)	0	37	4
Lyon	2013–14	Ligue 1	36	15	2	2	4	3	12 (Note: Four appearances in UEFA Champions League, eight appearances and two goals in UEFA Europa League)	2	—		54	22
Lyon	2014–15	Ligue 1	33	27	2	2	1	1	4	1	—		40	31
Lyon	2015–16	Ligue 1	34	21	2	0	1	0	6	2	1	0	44	23
Lyon	2016–17	Ligue 1	30	28	1	1	1	1	12 (Note: Four appearances and one goal in UEFA Champions League, eight appearances and six goals in UEFA Europa League)	7	1	0	45	37
Lyon	Total		203	100	11	7	11	7	47	15	3	0	275	129
Arsenal	2017–18	Premier League	32	14	0	0	2	0	4	3	1 (Note: Appearance in FA Community Shield)	0	39	17
Arsenal	2018–19	Premier League	35	13	2	0	2	1	10	5	—		49	19
Arsenal	2019–20	Premier League	30	10	4	0	0	0	5	2	—		39	12
Arsenal	2020–21	Premier League	31	13	2	0	2	1	8	3	0	0	43	17
Arsenal	2021–22	Premier League	30	4	1	0	5	2	—		—		36	6
Arsenal	Total		158	54	9	0	11	4	27	13	1	0	206	71
Lyon	2022–23	Ligue 1	35	27	4	4	—		—		—		39	31
Lyon	2023–24	Ligue 1	29	19	6	3	—		—		—		35	22
Lyon	2024–25	Ligue 1	30	15	2	0	—		10	4	—		42	19
Lyon	Total		94	61	12	7	—		10	4	—		116	72
Neom	2025–26	Saudi Pro League	32	11	1	1	—		—		—		33	12
Neom	2026–27	Saudi Pro League	10	5	1	1	—		—		1 (Note: Appearance in GFF Gulf Club Champions League)	2	12	8
Neom	Total		42	16	2	2	—		—		1	2	45	20
Career total			550	254	34	16	22	11	84	32	5	2	695	315

=== International ===
Appearances and goals by national team and year
National team	Year	Apps	Goals
France	2013	2	0
France	2014	3	0
France	2015	5	1
France	2017	6	2
Total		16	3

Scores and results list France's goal tally first, score column indicates score after each Lacazette goal

List of international goals scored by Alexandre Lacazette
No.	Date	Venue	Cap	Opponent	Score	Result	Competition	Ref.
1	29 March 2015	Stade Geoffroy-Guichard, Saint-Étienne, France	6	Denmark	1–0	2–0	Friendly	
2	14 November 2017	RheinEnergieStadion, Cologne, Germany	16	Germany	1–0	2–2	Friendly	
3	14 November 2017	RheinEnergieStadion, Cologne, Germany	16	Germany	2–1	2–2	Friendly	

== Honours ==
Lyon

- Coupe de France: 2011–12; runner-up: 2023–24
- Trophée des Champions: 2012

Arsenal

- FA Cup: 2019–20
- FA Community Shield: 2017
- UEFA Europa League runner-up: 2018–19

France U17

- UEFA European Under-17 Championship runner-up: 2008

France U19

- UEFA European Under-19 Championship: 2010

France U23

- Summer Olympics silver medal: 2024

Individual

- FIFA U-20 World Cup Bronze Shoe: 2011
- UNFP Ligue 1 Team of the Year: 2013–14, 2014–15, 2016–17
- UNFP Ligue 1 Player of the Year: 2014–15
- Ligue 1 top scorer: 2014–15
- Onze de Bronze: 2014–15
- UNFP Ligue 1 Player of the Month: December 2014, January 2015, August 2016, April 2024
- UEFA Europa League Squad of the Season: 2016–17
- Arsenal Player of the Season: 2018–19
- Premier League Goal of the Month: December 2021

Orders

- Knight of the National Order of Merit: 2024
