= Émile Antonio =

French footballer (1928–2022)

Personal information
- Date of birth: 22 April 1928
- Place of birth: Auzat-la-Combelle, France
- Date of death: 20 September 2022 (aged 94)
- Height: 1.68 m (5 ft 6 in)
- Position: Midfielder

Youth career
- –1946: La Combelle CCA

Senior career*
Years	Team	Apps	(Gls)
1946–1950	La Combelle CCA		
1950–1953	FC Sète	89	(18)
1953–1954	Nice	28	(3)
1954–1961	Lyon	184	(23)
1961–1963	Montferrand		
1963–1972	La Combelle CCA		

International career
- France amateur
	France B	4	(0)

Managerial career
- 1963–1975: La Combelle CCA
- * Club domestic league appearances and goals

Émile Antonio (22 April 1928 – 20 September 2022) was a French footballer who played as a midfielder.

== Career ==
Born in Auzat-la-Combelle in 1928 to emigrants, Antonio became a French citizen in 1931. Having made his debut at his local club, La Combelle CCA, Antonio joined Sète.

Antonio spent the 1953–54 season at Nice, making 28 appearances scoring 3 goals. With Nice, he also won the 1953–54 Coupe de France thanks to a 2–1 win in the final against Marseille, before moving to Olympique Lyonnais.

He stayed at Lyon for seven seasons. He played 183 matches (of which 160 were league games) and scored 23 goals. He is still a well-renowned player at Gerland.

In 1961, he finished his professional career. He played at Montferrand, before returning to his first club, La Combelle CCA. He coached this club between 1963 and 1975.

== Later life and death ==
In June 2022 Antonio's hometown Auzat-la-Combelle named its stadium after him as a tribute.

Antonio died on 20 September 2022, at the age of 94.

== Honours ==
Nice

- Coupe de France: 1953–54
