= Raúl Nogués =

Argentine footballer

Personal information
- Full name: Raúl José Nogués
- Date of birth: 26 February 1952 (age 74)
- Place of birth: Florida, Buenos Aires, Argentina
- Height: 1.75 m (5 ft 9 in)
- Position: Midfielder

Youth career
- 1968–1970: Chacarita Juniors

Senior career*
Years	Team	Apps	(Gls)
1970–1972	Chacarita Juniors	38	(2)
1972–1974	Lille	39	(18)
1974–1977	Marseille	85	(15)
1977–1980	Monaco	101	(29)
1980–1981	Nice	38	(10)
1981–1982	Saint-Étienne	29	(5)
1982–1983	RC Paris	32	(9)
1983–1987	La Chaux-de-Fonds	67	(20)
1987–1988	Étoile Carouge	9	(2)
1988–1989	FC Collex-Bossy		
- * Club domestic league appearances and goals

Raúl Nogués (born 26 February 1952) is an Argentine former professional football who played as a midfielder for clubs in Argentina and France.

== Honours ==
Lille

- Ligue 2: 1973–74

Marseille

- Coupe de France: 1975–76

Monaco

- Ligue 1: 1977–78
- Coupe de France: 1979–80

Individual

- Swiss Foreign Footballer of the Year: 1983–84
