= Yves Chauveau =

French footballer (born 1945)

Personal information
- Date of birth: 14 April 1945 (age 81)
- Place of birth: Bourg-en-Bresse, France
- Height: 1.78 m (5 ft 10 in)
- Position: Goalkeeper

Youth career
- Grenoble

Senior career*
| Years | Team | Apps | (Gls) |
| 1966–1975 | Lyon | 305 | (0) |
| 1975–1978 | Monaco | 75 | (0) |
| 1978–1982 | Lyon | 115 | (0) |
| 1982–1984 | Villefranche | | |

International career
| 1969 | France | 1 | (0) |
- * Club domestic league appearances and goals

Yves Chauveau (French pronunciation: [iv ʃovo]; born 14 April 1945) is a French retired professional footballer who played as a goalkeeper.
