= Auzat-la-Combelle =

- Commune
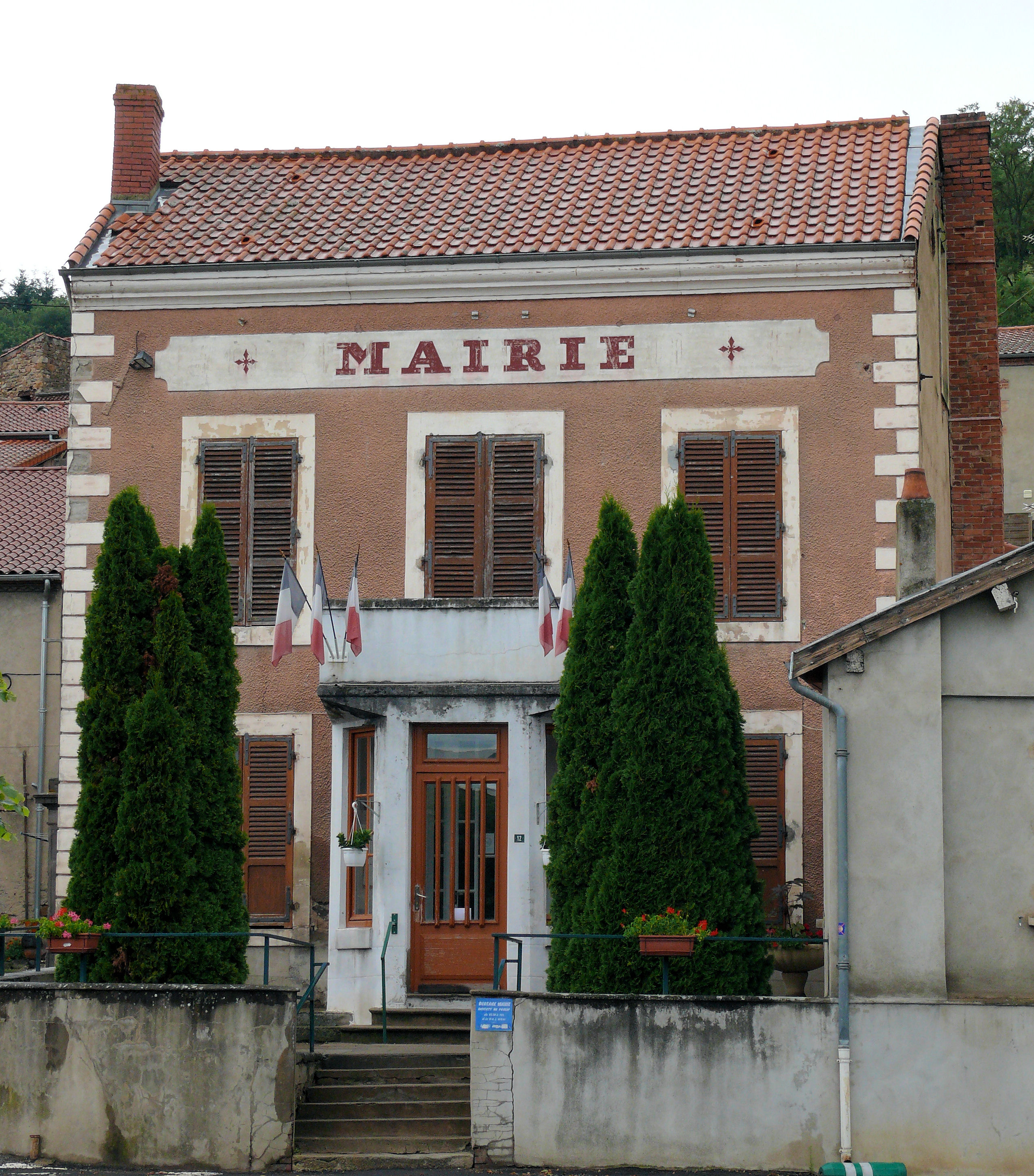
- The town hall in Auzat-la-Combelle

- Coat of arms
- Location of Auzat-la-Combelle
- Location within France Location within Auvergne-Rhône-Alpes
- Coordinates: 45°27′10″N 3°19′26″E
- Country: France
- Region: Auvergne-Rhône-Alpes
- Department: Puy-de-Dôme
- Arrondissement: Issoire
- Canton: Brassac-les-Mines
- Intercommunality: Agglo Pays d'Issoire

Government
  - Mayor (2026–32): Georges Tinet
- Area^{1}: 12.74 km^{2} (4.92 sq mi)
- Elevation: 400 m (1,300 ft)
- Population (2023): 1,956
  - Density: 153.5/km^{2} (397.6/sq mi)
- Time zone: UTC+01:00 (CET)
  - Summer (DST): UTC+02:00 (CEST)
- INSEE/Postal code: 63022 /63570
- ^{1} French Land Register data, which excludes lakes, ponds, glaciers > 1 km^{2} (0.386 sq mi or 247 acres) and river estuaries.

Auzat-la-Combelle (French pronunciation: [oza la kɔ̃bɛl], before 1998: Auzat-sur-Allier) is a commune in the Puy-de-Dôme department in Auvergne-Rhône-Alpes in central France. It is in the canton of Brassac-les-Mines.

== Population ==
Historical population
Year	Pop.	±% p.a.
1968	2,910	—
1975	2,632	−1.42%
1982	2,468	−0.91%
1990	2,156	−1.68%
1999	2,045	−0.59%
2007	2,037	−0.05%
2012	2,077	+0.39%
2017	2,076	−0.01%
2023	1,956	−0.99%
Source: INSEE

== See also ==
- Communes of the Puy-de-Dôme department
