= Jérémy Berthod =

French footballer (born 1984)

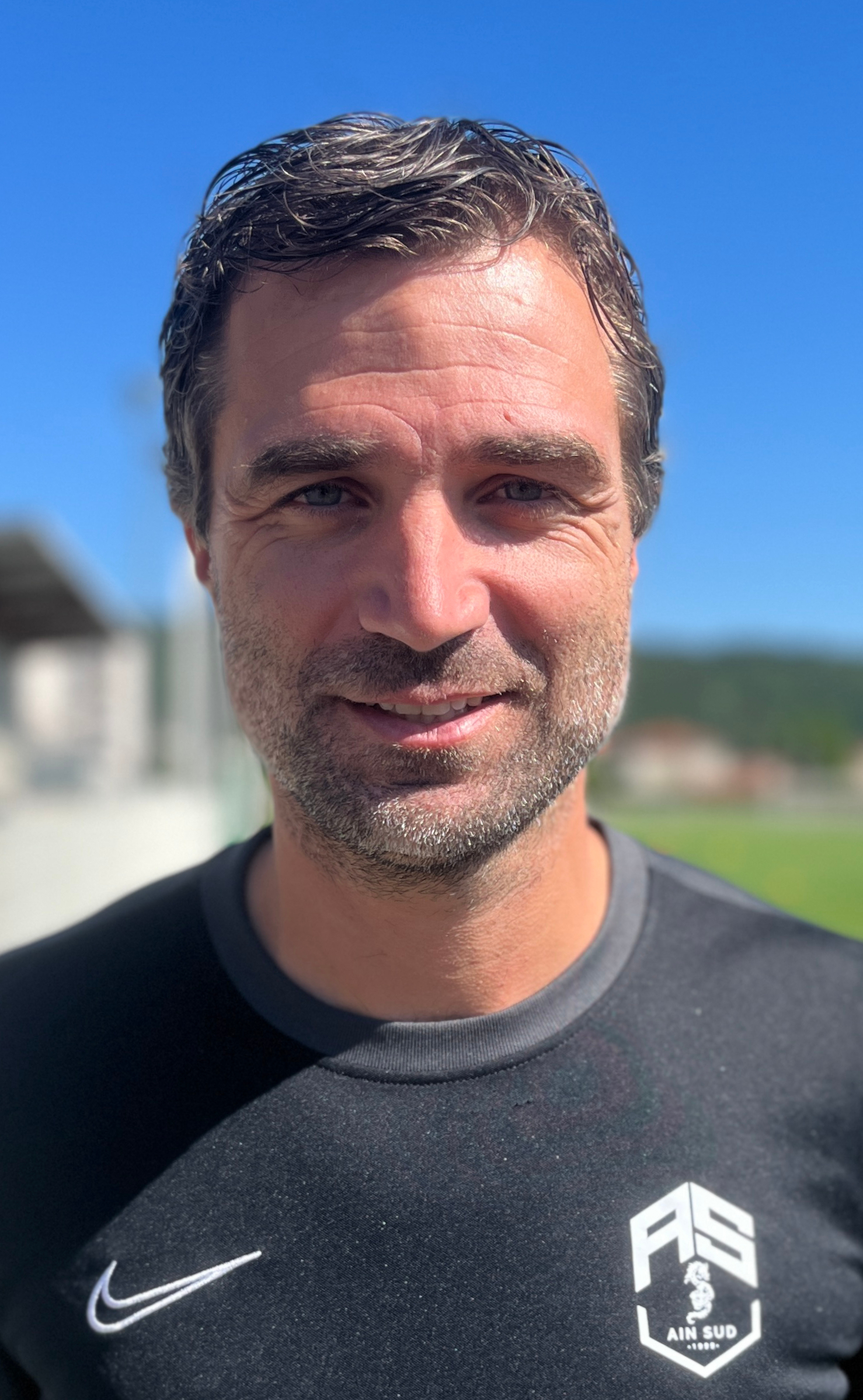
- Berthod in 2022

Personal information
- Date of birth: 24 April 1984 (age 42)
- Place of birth: Tassin-la-Demi-Lune, France
- Height: 1.80 m (5 ft 11 in)
- Position: Left-back

Youth career
- 1992–1995: CS Chazay-Civrieux
- 1995–2002: Lyon

Senior career*
Years	Team	Apps	(Gls)
2002–2007	Lyon	74	(1)
2007–2008	Monaco	12	(0)
2008–2012	Auxerre	59	(1)
2013–2015	Sarpsborg 08	38	(4)
Total		183	(6)

International career
2000–2002	France U17	17	(1)
2002–2003	France U19	15	(3)
2003–2007	France U21	8	(0)

Managerial career
- 2022–2023: Ain Sud
- * Club domestic league appearances and goals

Jérémy Berthod (born 24 April 1984) is a French former professional footballer who played as a left-back. He was the trainer of Ain Sud for the 2022–23 season.

== Career ==
Berthod was born in Tassin-la-Demi-Lune, Rhône. A product of the Olympique Lyonnais youth academy, he made his first team debut on 13 September 2003 in a 1–1 home draw against Auxerre. He went on to play a somewhat important part in the team's four consecutive Ligue 1 titles, and was also a regular selection for the France U-21 squad during that timeframe.

In July 2007, l'OL agreed to transfer Berthod to AS Monaco for a fee of €2m. He made his Monaco debut in the season's second round, a 2–1 defeat at Lorient – picking up a yellow card in the process – and finished the season with 12 league contests played.

After an unimpressive year at Monaco, Berthod made a summer move to Auxerre. Over the course of four top flight seasons he was used solely as a backup, being released at the end of 2011–12 as his team ranked 20th and last.

On 4 February 2013, aged nearly 29, Berthod moved abroad for the first time, signing a two-year contract with Norwegian club Sarpsborg 08.

On 19 March 2015, he re-joined lyon as semi-amateur to help team with many injuries.

He is the trainer of Ain Sud for the 2022–23 season.

== Personal life ==
Berthod's younger brother, Alexandre Berthod, was also a footballer (and a defender), and also briefly represented Lyon.

== Career statistics ==
Appearances and goals by club, season and competition
Season	Club	League			National cup		League cup		Continental		Total	
Season	Club	Division	Apps	Goals	Apps	Goals	Apps	Goals	Apps	Goals	Apps	Goals
Lyon	2003–04	Ligue 1	26	0	3	0	1	0	6	0	36	0
Lyon	2004–05	Ligue 1	22	0	1	0	1	0	4	1	28	1
Lyon	2005–06	Ligue 1	16	1	0	0	1	0	2	0	19	1
Lyon	2006–07	Ligue 1	10	0	2	0	0	0	1	0	13	0
Lyon	Total		74	1	6	0	3	0	13	1	96	2
Monaco	2007–08	Ligue 1	12	0	1	0	0	0	–		13	0
Auxerre	2008–09	Ligue 1	8	1	0	0	0	0	–		8	1
Auxerre	2009–10	Ligue 1	19	0	3	0	0	0	–		22	0
Auxerre	2010–11	Ligue 1	17	0	1	0	3	0	1	0	22	0
Auxerre	2011–12	Ligue 1	15	0	2	0	1	0	–		18	0
Auxerre	Total		59	1	6	0	4	0	1	0	70	1
Sarpsborg 08	2013	Tippeligaen	22	3	0	0	–		–		22	3
Sarpsborg 08	2014	Tippeligaen	16	1	2	0	–		–		18	1
Sarpsborg 08	Total		38	4	2	0	0	0	0	0	40	4
Career total			183	6	15	0	7	0	14	1	219	7

== Honours ==
Lyon

- Ligue 1: 2003–04, 2004–05, 2005–06, 2006–07
- Trophée des Champions: 2004, 2005, 2006

France U17

- FIFA U-17 World Championship: 2001
