= Ain Sud =

French football club

- Founded: 30 April 1999
- Ground: Stade du Forum
- Capacity: 500
- Chairman: Pascal Yvars (2024– )
- Manager: Hervé Yvars (2024– )
- League: R1
Home colours

Ain Sud, previously Ain Sud Foot, is a French association football team founded in 1999. They are based in Saint-Maurice-de-Beynost, Auvergne-Rhône-Alpes, France and played in the Championnat National 3, since the 2017–18 season to the 2023-2024 season. They play at the Stade du Forum, which has a capacity of 500.

The club created in 1999 is a fusion among small local clubs: Olympique Saint-Maurice, ES Beynost, US Miribel and FC Neyron. In July 2020 the club is renamed in simply Ain Sud.

== People of Ain Sud ==
=== Presidents ===
From the 20 of December 2019, Bertrand Paris is the Président of Ain Sud. He replaced the historic President Maurice Bourgeon in place from the creation of the club in 1999.

Presidents of Ain Sud
| Name | Period | Image |
|---|---|---|
| Maurice Bourgeon | 1999 - 2019 | |
| Bertrand Paris | 2019 - 2024 | |
| Gilles Pierou | May 2024 (interim) | |
| Pascal Yvars | From 1st June 2024 | |

=== Coaches ===
Managers of Ain Sud
| Name | Period | Image |
|---|---|---|
| Alain Irvazian | 1999 - 2000 | |
| Gilles De Rocco | 2000 - 2003 | |
| Bruno Pelissier | 2003 - 2006 | |
| Michel Loudot | 2006 - 2010 | |
| Jean-Christophe Devaux | 2010 - 2013 | |
| Grégory Balfin | 2013 - 2015 | |
| Hervé Yvars | From August 2015 to June 2022 | |
| Jérémy Berthod | 2022 - 2023 | |
| Samir Retbi | 2023 - 2024 | |
| Hervé Yvars | From June 2024 | Hervé Yvars |

=== Notable players ===
- Hervé Della Maggiore 2000-2002

== Former logos ==
Until July 2020
