= Gilles De Rocco =

French footballer (born 1957)

Gilles De Rocco (born 7 March 1957 in Dijon) is a French former professional footballer who played as a goalkeeper. He played with Lyon from 1975 to 1981, notably appearing in the 1976 Coupe de France Final.

== Playing career ==
- 1974–1975: Beaune
- 1975–1981: Lyon
- 1981–1982: USL Dunkerque (D2)
- 1982–1987: Thonon
- 1987–1990: AS Red Star

== Coaching career ==
- 2000–2003: Ain Sud Foot
