= Jean-François Jodar =

French footballer (born 1949)

Personal information
- Date of birth: 2 December 1949 (age 76)
- Place of birth: Montereau-Fault-Yonne, France
- Height: 1.78 m (5 ft 10 in)
- Position: Defender

Youth career
- 1960–1967: Montereau

Senior career*
Years	Team	Apps	(Gls)
1967–1975	Reims		
1975–1979	Lyon	134	(2)
1979–1983	Strasbourg	131	(0)
1983–1986	Montceau	50	(0)

International career
1972–1975	France	6	(1)

Managerial career
- 1983–1986: Montceau (player-coach)
- 1987–1988: France (assistant)
- 1988–2002: France youth teams
- 2002–2003: United Arab Emirates U20
- 2004: United Arab Emirates
- 2006–2008: Mali
- 2009: Hassania Agadir
- 2010: Moghreb Tétouan
- * Club domestic league appearances and goals

Jean-François Jodar (born 2 December 1949) is a French former football player and manager.
