= Aimé Mignot =

French footballer and coach (1932–2022)

Personal information
- Date of birth: 3 December 1932
- Place of birth: Aix-en-Provence, France
- Date of death: 26 March 2022 (aged 89)
- Place of death: France
- Position: Defender

Senior career*
Years	Team	Apps	(Gls)
- Aix
1955–1966	Lyon	400	(1)

Managerial career
- 1968–1976: Lyon
- 1976–1979: Angers
- 1979–1981: Alès
- 1987–1997: France (women)
- * Club domestic league appearances and goals

Aimé Mignot (French: [ɛme miɲo]; 3 December 1932 – 26 March 2022) was a French footballer who played as a defender for Aix and Lyon. He coached Lyon, Angers, Alès and the France women's national team.
