= Jean-Marc Martinez =

French footballer (born 1956)

Personal information
- Date of birth: 19 July 1956 (age 70)
- Place of birth: Relizane, French Algeria
- Height: 1.71 m (5 ft 7 in)
- Position: Midfielder

Senior career*
Years	Team	Apps	(Gls)
1974–1975	Martigues	30	(5)
1975–1977	Marseille	24	(0)
1977–1980	Lyon	57	(6)
1980–1986	Martigues	176	(34)
1986–1991	ES Fosséenne		
Total		287+	(45+)
- * Club domestic league appearances and goals

Jean-Marc Martinez (born 19 July 1956) is a French former professional footballer who played as a midfielder. During his career, he scored 45 goals in 287 games in the first two tiers of French football.

== Coaching career ==
Following his retirement from his playing career, Martinez became a youth football coach. From 2002 to 2004, he was a youth coach for Emirati club Al Ain. He was then contracted to the Kuwait Football Association from 2004 to 2008. Martinez then spent one year as a youth coach for Kuwaiti club Al-Arabi before joining Qatari club Al Sadd in the same position, where he also stayed one year.

== Honours ==
Marseille

- Coupe de France: 1975–76
