= 2025–26 Coupe de France preliminary rounds, Auvergne-Rhône-Alpes =

The 2025–26 Coupe de France preliminary rounds, Auvergne-Rhône-Alpes was the qualifying competition to decide which teams from the leagues of the Auvergne-Rhône-Alpes region of France took part in the main competition from the seventh round.

A total of twenty teams qualified from the Auvergne-Rhône-Alpes preliminary rounds.

In 2024–25, FC Bourgoin-Jallieu progressed furthest in the main competition, reaching the round of 16 before being defeated in a penalty shoot-out by Ligue 1 side Stade de Reims.

== Draws and fixtures ==
On 21 July 2025, the league announced that 913 clubs from the region had entered the competition. On 25 July 2025 the details of the first round draw were published, with 332 ties drawn, comprising teams from the district-level divisions, with 62 receiving byes. The second round draw was published on 18 August 2025, with all remaining teams up to and including the second regional level entering, and with 270 ties drawn.

The third round draw was made on 3 September 2025, featuring the entry of the 20 Régional 1 level teams and the 8 Championnat National 3 level teams, and saw 149 ties drawn. The fourth round draw, featuring entry of the 5 teams from Championnat National 2, was made on 17 September 2025, with 77 ties drawn. The fifth round draw was made on 1 October 2025, featuring the entry of the 3 Championnat National teams, with 40 ties drawn. The twenty ties of the sixth round were drawn on 13 October 2025.

=== First round ===
These matches were played between 22 and 24 August 2025.

First Round Results: Auvergne-Rhône-Alpes
Tie no	Home team (Tier)	Score	Away team (Tier)
1.	AS Gennetinoise (11)	1–2	US Chevagnes (10)
2.	Jaligny Vaumas Foot (11)	1–3	AS Chassenard Luneau (11)
3.	AS Neuilly-le-Réal (11)	2–0	Espoir Molinetois (10)
4.	US Varennes-sur-Tèche (11)	1–4	US Trezelles (10)
5.	AS Montluçon Chatelard (10)	2–0	US Marcillat-Pionsat (10)
6.	ES Saint-Étienne-de-Vicq/Bost/Saint-Christophe (11)	1–12	AS Louchy (10)
7.	AS Ménulphienne (11)	1–3	AS Tronget (10)
8.	ES Arfeuilles (12)	0–3	SC Gannat (11)
9.	US Ainay-le-Château (12)	2–5	Ballon Beaulonnais (11)
10.	US Hérisson (12)	0–9	US Biachette Désertines (10)
11.	FC Dorat (12)	0–0 (4–5 p)	AC Creuzier-le-Vieux (10)
12.	US Busset (11)	0–4	Stade Saint-Yorre (9)
13.	AS Billezois (12)	2–5	ES Montagne Bourbonnaise (10)
14.	FC Le Vivre Ensemble (12)	10–3	Entente Mercy-Chapeau Montbeugny (11)
15.	AS Le Breuil (12)	0–12	US Abrest (11)
16.	AS Espinasse-Vozelle (10)	1–4	Étoile Moulins Yzeure (9)
17.	US Bien-Assis (11)	0–3	AS Val de Sioule (10)
18.	AS Brugheas (13)	0–6	SC Saint-Pourcain (11)
19.	CS Chantelle (11)	3–1	AS Nord Vignoble (10)
20.	US Saint-Désiré (11)	1–3	JS Neuvy (11)
21.	US Meaulne-Braize (12)	0–7	US Saint-Victor (10)
22.	Saligny Pierrefitte Foot (11)	1–2	US Lusigny (10)
23.	FR Pouzy-Mésangy (11)	0–4	US Lignerolles-Lavault Sainte-Anne Prémilhat (10)
24.	AS Néris (12)	0–3 (Note: Tie won by means of forfeit.)	US Toque Huriel (11)
25.	AS Gipcy (13)	0–9	FC Haut d'Allier (10)
26.	ÉS La Bruyère (12)	1–2	AS Mayotte FC Bellerive (11)
27.	CS Bessay (10)	6–4	US Vallon (9)
28.	FC Ébreuil (12)	0–10	FC Billy-Crechy (9)
29.	US Carlat-Cros (11)	0–8	Aspre FC Fontagnes (11)
30.	US Besse (11)	2–3	FC Moussages (10)
31.	AS Chaudes-Aigues (10)	0–3	FC Massiac-Molompize-Blesle (9)
32.	Cézallier Alagnon FC (12)	0–2	La Chapelle/Saint-Poncy FC (11)
33.	Entente Anglards-Salers (12)	0–7	Jordanne FC (9)
34.	ES Pierrefortaise (11)	2–0	Saint-Georges SL (11)
35.	US Giou de Mamou (12)	1–3	Ayrens Sport (11)
36.	Saignes FC (11)	0–5	ES Margeride (11)
37.	US Labrousse-Vezels (12)	0–7	Sud Cantal Foot (9)
38.	AS Neussargues (11)	0–3	CS Arpajonnais (9)
39.	ES Saint-Mamet (11)	0–1	US de la Cère (10)
40.	US Cère et Landes (11)	3–2	Carladez-Goul Sportif (10)
41.	AS Yolet (11)	1–4	Ytrac Foot (9)
42.	Nord Cantal FC (11)	1–2	US Crandelles (10)
43.	AS Cézens (12)	1–8	FC Artense (10)
44.	AS Vebret-Antignac (12)	6–3	FC des Quatre Vallées (9)
45.	CS Vézac (11)	1–1 (1–3 p)	AS Pleaux-Rilhac-Barriac (9)
46.	FC Albepierre-Bredons (12)	1–4	ES Riomois-Condat (10)
47.	FJEP Freycenets Saint-Jeures (10)	1–1 (5–6 p)	AS Grazac-Lapte (9)
48.	CO Coubon (10)	1–1 (3–5 p)	AS Cheminots Langeac (9)
49.	Vigilante Saint-Pal-de-Mons (10)	0–4	Olympique Retournac Beauzac (9)
50.	AS Emblavez-Vorey (9)	5–0	FC Dunières (10)
51.	AS Loudes (10)	2–4	AS Chadrac (9)
52.	US Bains-Saint-Christophe (10)	1–1 (4–5 p)	AG Sainte-Sigolène (9)
53.	FC Aurec (11)	0–9	FC Saint-Germain-Laprade (9)
54.	AS Villettoise (11)	1–8	FC Arzon (10)
55.	Espérance Vieille-Brioude (11)	3–2	ES Saint-Germinoise (10)
56.	US Landos (10)	1–2	Aiguilhe FC (11)
57.	AS Saugues (10)	0–2	Solignac-Cussac FC (10)
58.	FC La Chapelle de l'Aurec (12)	1–3	AS Saint-Pal-en-Chalencon (11)
59.	FC Pont Salomon Lusitanos (12)	3–7	US Bassoise (11)
60.	AS Saint-Ferréol Gampille Firminy (11)	1–3	US Montfaucon Montregard Raucoules (10)
61.	FC Venteuges (12)	0–5	AS Chadron Saint-Martin (11)
62.	FC Pradelles (13)	0–4	FC Vézézoux (11)
63.	AS Mazeyrat-d'Allier (12)	0–4	US Lantriac (11)
64.	AS Clermont Toutes Nationalités (12)	3–1	AS Pontgibaud (11)
65.	AS Charmonvillo (12)	3–3 (5–4 p)	ES Volcans Malauzat (11)
66.	US Val de Couze Chambon (12)	1–2	AS Châteaugay (11)
67.	FC Bouzel (12)	3–1	AS Joze (11)
68.	AS Saint-Ours (12)	2–9	FC Olby-Ceyssat-Mazayes (11)
69.	ES Couze Pavin (11)	3–2	Pérignat FC (12)
70.	FC Gerzat (12)	3–6	Saint-Amant et Tallende SC (10)
71.	Sancy Artense Foot (11)	1–6	US Saint-Georges / Les Ancizes (11)
72.	AS Job (11)	1–1 (5–3 p)	FC Thiers Auvergne (11)
73.	US Menat-Neuf-Eglise (12)	0–4	AS Royat (10)
74.	FC Bromont-Lamothe/Montfermy (10)	1–3	RC Charbonnières-Paugnat (9)
75.	ÉS Saint-Rémy-sur-Durolle (10)	2–1	CS Pont-de-Dore (9)
76.	Entente Vallée de la Dordogne (10)	0–1	ALS Besse Egliseneuve (10)
77.	FC Sauxillanges Saint-Babel Brenat (10)	5–2	FC Mirefleurs (9)
78.	CS Saint-Bonnet-près-Riom (10)	2–2 (4–2 p)	US Orcet (9)
79.	SC Billom (10)	0–3	US Bassin Minier (9)
80.	Durolle Foot (10)	0–4	US Courpière (9)
81.	FC Saint-Julien-de-Coppel (10)	3–2	FC Plauzat-Champeix (9)
82.	US Saint-Gervaisienne (10)	1–5	CO Veyre-Monton (9)
83.	US Ménétrol (10)	0–2	AS Enval-Marsat (9)
84.	AS Cellule (10)	1–6	FC Blanzat (9)
85.	FC Nord Combraille (10)	1–2	US Maringues (9)
86.	AS Moissat (10)	1–4	FC Martres-Lussat (9)
87.	RAS Beauregard l'Évêque (10)	0–4	Aulnat Sportif (9)
88.	US Messeix Bourg-Lastic (10)	0–6	Clermont Métropole FC (9)
89.	Saint-Clément Thuret FC (10)	2–2 (7–8 p)	UJ Clermontoise (9)
90.	AS Romagnat (9)	4–2	US Chapdes-Beaufort (9)
91.	ÉS Arconsat (10)	0–0 (7–6 p)	Ecureuils Franc Rosier (9)
92.	US Limons (10)	4–5	FC Vertaizon (9)
93.	FC Nord Limagne (10)	4–0	FF Chappes (9)
94.	AS Roche-Blanche FC (9)	0–6	US Les Martres-de-Veyre (9)
95.	FC Lezoux (9)	2–0	RS Luzillat-Charnat-Vinzelles (9)
96.	US 2 Vallons (13)	1–3	ES Nord Drôme (11)
97.	FC Saint-Restitut (13)	0–6	CO Donzère (10)
98.	SC Romans (13)	1–4	FC Bourg-lès-Valence (10)
99.	FC Royans Vercors (13)	0–3	US Montélier (11)
100.	Vivar's Club Soyons (13)	1–4	FC Portois (11)
101.	ES Le Laris-Montchenu (13)	1–10	Vallis Auréa Foot (11)
102.	ES Trèfle (13)	1–4	FC Bourguisan (11)
103.	CS Malataverne (13)	2–3	US Ancône (11)
104.	Atalanta Sud Vercors (13)	2–14	IF Barbières-Bésayes-Rochefort-Samson-Marches (11)
105.	AS Cruas (13)	1–3	FA Le Teil Melas (11)
106.	AS des 3 Becs (13)	1–1 (4–2 p)	Allex-Chabrillan-Eurre FC (11)
107.	ASL Génissieux (13)	2–2 (1–3 p)	JS Saint-Paul-lès-Romans (11)
108.	AS Saint-Marcelloise (13)	2–2 (0–2 p)	RC Mauves (11)
109.	FC Alboussière (13)	0–2	FC Colombier Saint-Barthélemy (11)
110.	US Pont-La Roche (10)	3–1 (Note: Tie reversed from original draw.)	US Peyrins (12)
111.	FC Baume Bouchet Montségur (12)	1–7	FC Rochegudien (10)
112.	AS La Sanne (12)	1–4	Entente Sarras Sports Saint-Vallier (10)
113.	SA Saint-Agrève (12)	0–0 (4–5 p)	AC Allet (12)
114.	AF Ceven (12)	1–0	US Lussas (11)
115.	FC Clérieux-Saint-Bardoux-Granges-les-Beaumont (12)	1–2	AAJ Saint-Alban-d'Ay (11)
116.	SC Piraillon (12)	1–4	ES Boulieu-lès-Annonay (10)
117.	AS Saint-Barthélemy-Grozon (12)	0–1	US Val d'Ay (11)
118.	FC Saint-Didier-sous-Aubenas (12)	3–3 (7–8 p)	AS Berg-Helvie (10)
119.	FC Hermitage (12)	3–3 (4–3 p)	CS Châteauneuf-de-Galaure (11)
120.	US Baixoise (13)	1–7	FR Allan (11)
121.	AS Roiffieux (11)	3–2	PS Romanaise (10)
122.	CO Châteauneuf-du-Rhône (11)	4–1	US Portes Hautes Cévennes (11)
123.	JS Livron (11)	1–2	FC Muzolais (10)
124.	AS Roussas-Granges-Gontardes (11)	1–3	US Rochemaure (10)
125.	FC 540 (12)	0–3	FC Valdaine (10)
126.	US Vals-les-Bains (12)	0–0 (5–4 p)	US Bas-Vivarais (10)
127.	SC Bourguésan (12)	1–3	FC Montélimar (9)
128.	US Saint-Gervais-sur-Roubion (12)	2–3	US Drôme Provence (11)
129.	AS Désaignes (12)	0–2	US Saint-Martinoise (11)
130.	AS Vallée du Doux (12)	0–0 (5–4 p)	CO Châteauneuvois (10)
131.	ASF Annonay (12)	3–7	FC Châtelet (10)
132.	FC Montmiral Parnans (12)	0–3	FC Plateau Ardèchois (11)
133.	FC Alixan (12)	1–2	AS Dolon (11)
134.	FC Goubetois (12)	1–6	FC Larnage-Serves (10)
135.	AS du Pic (12)	1–1 (2–4 p)	AS Homenetmen Bourg-lès Valence (11)
136.	US Veyras (12)	2–3	Olympique Centre Ardèche (10)
137.	FC Félines-Saint-Cyr-Peaugres (12)	2–5	AS Cancoise (11)
138.	US Meysse (12)	1–3	RC Savasson (11)
139.	AS Saint-Uze (12)	1–4	AS Valensolles (11)
140.	ÉS Saint-Jeure-d'Ay-Marsan (12)	1–3	FC Hauterives US Grand Serre (10)
141.	FC Bren (12)	1–3	FC Rambertois (11)
142.	EA Montvendre (12)	0–3	US Beaufort-Aouste (11)
143.	ES Malissardoise (11)	5–1	FC Mahorais Drôme Ardèche (12)
144.	AS Portugaise Valence (12)	2–2 (3–1 p)	AS Cornas (10)
145.	FC Cheylarois (12)	2–1	AS Coucouron (11)
146.	FC Sauzet (12)	1–4	US Vallée du Jabron (10)
147.	FC Sud Isère (11)	3–0	US Sassenage (10)
148.	GS Chasse (11)	1–6	Artas Charantonnay FC (10)
149.	US Reventin (11)	5–1	FC Sévenne (12)
150.	Isle d'Abeau FC (11)	3–5	AS Diémoz (10)
151.	Turcs de Grenoble (11)	1–1 (6–7 p)	AS Saint-André-le-Gaz (10)
152.	ES Izeaux (12)	3–0	Rives SF (11)
153.	Saint-Quentin-Fallavier FC (10)	0–1	AL Saint-Maurice-l'Exil (9)
154.	FC Saint-Martin-d'Uriage (12)	2–3	Union Nord Iséroise Foot (11)
155.	Deux Rochers FC (10)	0–1	FC Pays Voironnais (9)
156.	Claix Football (11)	2–4	AS Italienne Européenne Grenoble (10)
157.	Olympique Nord Dauphiné (12)	1–3	Muroise Foot (10)
158.	Saint-Alban Sportif (11)	2–7	FC Charvieu-Chavagneux (9)
159.	FC des Collines (12)	1–4	US Gières (9)
160.	CS Nivolas-Vermelle (11)	1–3	CF Estrablin (9)
161.	US Saint-Paul-de-Varces (11)	0–3	FC Vallée de la Gresse (9)
162.	Crémieu FC (12)	2–5	Vallée du Guiers FC (10)
163.	Vourey Sports (13)	0–3	Le Grand-Lemps/Colombe/Apprieu Foot 38 (11)
164.	FC Voreppe (12)	8–2	US Chatte (11)
165.	AS Toussieu (11)	2–1	FC Tignieu-Jameyzieu (11)
166.	FC Canton de Vinay (12)	2–5	FC Mahorais Grenoble (13)
167.	AS Crossey (12)	0–4	FC Lauzes (9)
168.	ASC Jons (12)	3–0	AS Vézeronce-Huert (11)
169.	Amicale Tunisienne Saint-Martin-d'Hères (11)	12–0	AC Poisat (13)
170.	AS Rhodanienne (11)	2–3	Beaucroissant FC (10)
171.	US La Bâtie-Divisin (12)	0–5	US Corbelin (10)
172.	FC Bilieu (12)	1–3	UO Portugal Saint-Martin-d'Hères (11)
173.	AS Ver Sau (12)	0–4	US Abbaye (11)
174.	ES Bizonnes-Belmont (13)	0–4	US Ruy Montceau (10)
175.	MJC Saint-Hilaire-de-la-Côte (12)	6–0	Olympique Les Avenières (13)
176.	US Montgasconnaise (12)	1–1 (1–4 p)	Noyarey FC (10)
177.	Eyzin-Saint-Sorlin FC (12)	0–5	AS Cheyssieu (12)
178.	ASCOL Foot 38 (13)	1–0	ASJF Domène (12)
179.	FC Quatre Montagnes (13)	0–6	FC Versoud (11)
180.	US Cassolards Passageois (11)	1–1 (1–4 p)	US Thodure (10)
181.	USÉ Antonine (12)	2–1	FC Virieu-Valondras (11)
182.	CS 4 Routes (11)	2–5	US Dolomoise (10)
183.	Chaleyssin-Valencin-Luxinay 38 FC (11)	4–4 (4–2 p)	CS Faramans (11)
184.	AS Saint-Lattier (11)	1–2	CA Goncelin (12)
185.	FO Seyssuellois (12)	0–3	US Beauvoir-Royas (12)
186.	AS Saint-Joseph-de-Rivière (11)	0–6	JS Saint-Georgeoise (11)
187.	Eclose Châteauvilain Badinières Football (11)	1–3	ASL Saint-Cassien (11)
188.	FC Chirens (11)	4–1	EF des Étangs (12)
189.	FC Vallée de l'Hien (12)	5–0	FC Velanne (12)
190.	CS Miribel (12)	4–5	FC Liers (12)
191.	ABH FC (10)	3–1	AS Algérienne Chambon-Feugerolles (9)
192.	Olympique Le Coteau (10)	0–1	FC Roche-Saint-Genest (9)
193.	Anzieux Foot (10)	1–0	CO La Rivière (9)
194.	USG La Fouillouse (10)	0–7	Lignon Football Couzan (9)
195.	FC Bonson-Saint-Cyprien (10)	3–0	Saint-Chamond Foot (9)
196.	AC Ripagerien Rive de Gier (10)	1–0	FCI Saint-Romain-le-Puy (9)
197.	AS Forez Roannais (10)	2–2 (1–3 p)	JS Cellieu (9)
198.	ES Veauche (9)	9–0	Périgneux Saint-Maurice Foot (10)
199.	AS Saint-Étienne Sud (12)	2–6	US Métare Saint-Étienne Sud Est (10)
200.	Olympique Est Roannais (11)	1–2	Avenir Côte Foot (10)
201.	Riorges FC (10)	7–0	FC Montagny (11)
202.	AS Portugais Loire Saint-Étienne (11)	4–6	GOAL Foot (10)
203.	ES Saint-Jean-Bonnefonds (11)	1–1 (5–3 p)	AS Châteauneuf (10)
204.	Rhins Trambouze Foot (10)	5–0	FC Ouches (11)
205.	FC Saint-Joseph-Saint-Martin (11)	2–2 (4–3 p)	Association Feu Vert (11)
206.	ES Doizieux-La Terrasse-sur-Dorlay (12)	1–2	OC Ondaine (11)
207.	ES Haut Forez (12)	0–2	AS Saint-Just (11)
208.	Bellegarde Sports (11)	4–1	US Filerin (11)
209.	AS Noirétable (11)	3–5	Sury SC (12)
210.	FC Bords de Loire (12)	1–5	ES Dyonisienne (11)
211.	Olympique du Montcel (11)	5–3	FC Montagnes du Matin (11)
212.	Mably Sport (12)	0–3	FC Saint-Martin-la-Sauveté (11)
213.	AS Jonzieux (12)	1–1 (3–2 p)	ES Montrond Cuzieu (11)
214.	FC Marcellinois (11)	1–4	US Bussières (11)
215.	FC Perreux (11)	4–0	US Villerest (12)
216.	US Briennon (12)	2–0	ES Ouest Roannais (12)
217.	AS Astrée (12)	0–6	Nord Roannais (11)
218.	FC Roanne (12)	1–3	ES Champdieu-Marcilly (11)
219.	AS Saint-Alban-les-Eaux (12)	0–2	US Parigny Saint-Cyr (11)
220.	AS La Chaumière (11)	0–3	FC Genilac (12)
221.	CS Hautes Chaumes (12)	1–4	FC Mayotte Roanne (11)
222.	Tartaras FC (13)	2–3	Espérance Croix de l'Orme la Ricamarie (none)
223.	ALFC Lerptien (12)	0–6	CS Crémeaux (11)
224.	AS Cordelle (12)	1–4	SS Ussonaise (12)
225.	Sud Forez Luriecquois FC (12)	7–3	AS Chausseterre Les Salles (11)
226.	Association Chandieu-Heyrieux (10)	4–2	US Villette-d'Anthon-Janneyrais (11)
227.	FC Meys-Grézieu (10)	2–1	FC Lamure Poule (9)
228.	Belleville Football Beaujolais (10)	3–6	FC Sud Ouest 69 (10)
229.	ES Frontonas-Chamagnieu (11)	3–3 (6–5 p)	FC Savigny Saint-Pierre (10)
230.	CS Vaulxois (11)	4–2	OS Beaujolais (11)
231.	Chazay FC (11)	2–1	Olympique Vaulx-en-Velin (9)
232.	US Arbent Marchon (10)	2–1	US Nantua (11)
233.	AS Anglefort (12)	0–8	US Culoz Grand Colombier (10)
234.	ES Ambronay-Saint-Jean-le-Vieux (12)	2–3	FC Artemare Valromey (11)
235.	Foot Trois Rivières (11)	0–5	AS Buers Villeurbanne (9)
236.	FC Denicé Arnas (11)	1–4	FC Lyon Croix-Rousse (10)
237.	FC Grigny (10)	5–1	AL Mions (10)
238.	FC Antillais Villeurbanne (12)	1–4	US Cheminots Lyon Vaise (11)
239.	AS Portugaise Vaulx-en-Velin (10)	2–2 (3–4 p)	AS Pusignan (9)
240.	FC Saint-Cyr Ampuis (12)	0–3	US Meyzieu (10)
241.	SC Mille Étangs (11)	3–3 (3–0 p)	Jassans-Frans Foot (10)
242.	FC Serrières-Villebois (11)	2–0	US Plaine de l'Ain (10)
243.	US Replonges (10)	1–0	ACC Franco Turc Bourg-en-Bresse (11)
244.	CSJ Châtillonnaise (12)	1–5	Centre Dombes Football (10)
245.	CS Reyrieux (12)	0–0 (5–4 p)	FC Priay (12)
246.	ISN FC Chaneins (12)	0–8	AS Genay (10)
247.	Plaine Revermont Foot (10)	2–3	CS Belley (9)
248.	US Veyziat (11)	0–4	Côtière Meximieux Villieu (10)
249.	Fareins Saône Vallée Foot (11)	1–3	FC Mont Brouilly (9)
250.	FC Mas-Rillier (11)	0–7	Saône Mont d'Or FC (9)
251.	SC Portes de l'Ain (11)	0–8	US Millery-Vourles (9)
252.	Olympique Saint-Denis-lès-Bourg (10)	0–5	Olympique Sud Revermont 01 (9)
253.	AS Dortan Lavancia (12)	4–3	Ambérieu FC (10)
254.	ES Cormoranche (11)	2–3	Olympique Belleroche Villefranche (9)
255.	FC Montluel (12)	1–2	ES Val de Saône (10)
256.	AS Saint-Étienne-sur-Chalaronne (12)	2–8	Bresse Foot 01 (10)
257.	AS Bâgé-le-Châtel (10)	0–2	ES Foissiat-Étrez (9)
258.	AS Grièges Pont de Veyle (12)	1–2	FC Manziat (10)
259.	FC Curtafond-Confrançon-Saint-Martin-Saint-Didier (11)	3–2	AS Chaveyriat-Chanoz (12)
260.	ÉS Liergues (10)	5–2	CAS Cheminots Oullins Lyon (9)
261.	ACS Mayotte du Rhône (11)	2–1	CS Ozon (10)
262.	AS Sornins Réunis (11)	1–5	AS Saint-Forgeux (9)
263.	Lyon Ouest SC (12)	0–5	USF Tarare (11)
264.	JS Irigny (12)	1–6	US Loire-Saint-Romain (9)
265.	Villeurbanne United FC (12)	0–3	Éveil de Lyon (10)
266.	FC Reneins Vauxonne (10)	2–2 (2–3 p)	Sud Azergues Foot (10)
267.	Entente Saint-Martin-du-Frêne/Maillat/Combe du Val (11)	2–4	FC Injoux-Génissiat (12)
268.	FC Bellignat (13)	1–1 (4–1 p)	Saint-Denis-Ambutrix-Château FC (11)
269.	AS Écully (11)	0–3	ÉS Trinité Lyon (9)
270.	FC La Giraudière (11)	0–3	AS Brignais (9)
271.	CS Chevroux (12)	0–4	FC Bord de Veyle (10)
272.	FC Sainte-Foy-lès-Lyon (11)	1–4	Feyzin Club Belle Étoile (9)
273.	AS Izernore Nurieux-Volognat (11)	2–1	Valserhône Foot (9)
274.	Olympic Sathonay Foot (11)	3–3 (4–3 p)	FC Point du Jour (9)
275.	Saône Franc Lyonnais (10)	1–2	AS Bron Grand Lyon (9)
276.	ASA Clochemerle (12)	1–7	AS Grosne (11)
277.	AS Limas (11)	1–7	Haute Brévenne Football (9)
278.	Caluire SC (11)	3–6	ES Saint-Priest (10)
279.	FC Tarare (12)	3–1	RC Béligny (11)
280.	Latino AFC Lyon (10)	5–1	ES Charly-Vernaison Foot (11)
281.	FC Bully (11)	2–3	FC Franchevillois (10)
282.	FC Haut de Chambéry (11)	2–4	Saint-Pierre SF (9)
283.	AS Parmelan Villaz (12)	1–2	FC Sud Lac (11)
284.	US Domessin (11)	1–1 (3–1 p)	EF Chautagne (10)
285.	AS Haute Combe de Savoie (11)	3–1	Cœur de Savoie (11)
286.	AS Mont Jovet Bozel (11)	1–2	Nivolet FC (10)
287.	US Chartreuse Guiers (10)	4–0	US Pontoise (9)
288.	CA Yennne (11)	2–1	JS Chambéry (9)
289.	US Grignon (11)	1–7	FC Haute Tarentaise (10)
290.	FC Saint-Michel Sports (11)	3–1	Challes SF (11)
291.	FC Laissaud (10)	2–1	Cognin Sports (9)
292.	AS Montagny (12)	1–9	CA Maurienne (10)
293.	AS Ugine (11)	1–2	FC Combloux-Megève (11)
294.	FC Apremont (none)	0–3	USC Aiguebelle (9)
295.	AS La Bridoire (11)	1–3	FC Chéran (11)
296.	Olympique Cran (11)	2–2 (5–4 p)	ÉS Bourget-du-Lac (10)
297.	US Modane (11)	1–6	FC Villargondran (9)
298.	AS Portugais Faverges (10)	6–1 (Note: AS Portugais Faverges penalised for fielding a suspended player, UO Albertville qualified.)	UO Albertville (9)
299.	FC des Bauges (12)	0–7	FC Frangy (11)
300.	US La Ravoire (10)	1–2	ES Lanfonnet (10)
301.	ES Meythet (11)	3–1	Chambéry Sport 73 (10)
302.	FC Semine (12)	0–7	CS Saint-Pierre (10)
303.	AS Versonnex-Grilly-Sauverny (12)	0–6	FC Vuache (11)
304.	Foot Sud Gessien (12)	5–2	FC La Filière (11)
305.	Union Salève Foot (12)	3–3 (7–6 p) (Note: Union Salève Foot penalised for fielding three suspended players, ES Amancy Cornier qualified.)	ES Amancy Cornier (10)
306.	FC Cruseilles (10)	2–0	FC Épagny-Metz-Tessy (11)
307.	ES Cernex (10)	7–1	US Challex (11)
308.	ES Thyez (11)	3–1 (Note: ES Thyez penalised for fielding a suspended player, Foot Sud 74 qualified.)	Foot Sud 74 (12)
309.	US Magland (12)	1–2	US Pers-Jussy (11)
310.	ES Saint-Jeoire-La Tour (10)	3–0	FC Des Salèves (13)
311.	CSL Perrignier (13)	1–8	Échenevex-Ségny-Chevry Olympique (11)
312.	FC Arenthon-Scientrier (13)	6–4	AS Marin (11)
313.	FC Villy-le-Pelloux (11)	2–2 (4–3 p)	AS Viuz-en-Sallaz (12)
314.	FC Gavot (12)	1–6	AS Prévessin-Moëns (10)
315.	FC Carroz d’Arâches (12)	1–1 (10–9 p)	FRS Champanges (10)
316.	CO Chavanod (10)	1–2	SC Morzine Vallée d'Aulps (9)
317.	Pays de Gex FC (10)	0–0 (5–3 p)	FC Ballaison (9)
318.	US Mont Blanc (10)	1–2	AS Sillingy (9)
319.	AJ Ville-la-Grand (11)	0–11	ASC Sallanches (9)
320.	ES Fillinges (10)	4–3	US Argonay (9)
321.	JS Reignier (11)	2–2 (4–2 p)	FC Evian (12)
322.	FC Leman Presqu'île (11)	2–2 (4–3 p)	AJ Anthy Margencel (11)
323.	CS Veigy-Foncenex (11)	10–3	Bonne AC (12)
324.	CS Amphion Publier (10)	2–0	AS Évires (12)
325.	FC Aravis (13)	1–1 (4–5 p)	CA Bonnevillois 1921 (11)
326.	AS Novalaise (11)	1–4	AS Portugais Annecy (12)
327.	ES Valleiry (10)	4–1	FC Saint-Baldoph (11)
328.	FC Cranves-Sales (10)	1–1 (3–1 p)	Marignier Sports (9)
329.	CS Ayze (10)	1–2	AG Bons-en-Chablais (9)
330.	FC Les Houches-Servoz (12)	1–1 (2–3 p)	US Vétraz-Monthoux (11)
331.	US Vougy (12)	0–3	AS Genevois (10)
332.	CS Vacheresse Vallée d'Abondance (12)	4–2	AS Le Lyaud-Armoy (11)

=== Second round ===
These matches were played on 30 and 31 August 2025.

Second Round Results: Auvergne-Rhône-Alpes
Tie no	Home team (Tier)	Score	Away team (Tier)
1.	US Chevagnes (10)	0–5	Bourbon Sportif (8)
2.	AS Chassenard Luneau (11)	0–4	FC Billy-Crechy (9)
3.	AS Neuilly-le-Réal (11)	1–4	AS Domérat (7)
4.	US Trezelles (10)	2–3	SC Avermes (8)
5.	AS Montluçon Chatelard (10)	3–1	Commentry FC (8)
6.	AS Louchy (10)	0–1	FC Souvigny (9)
7.	AS Tronget (10)	2–0	US Lignerolles-Lavault Sainte-Anne Prémilhat (10)
8.	SC Gannat (11)	0–6	Stade Saint-Yorre (9)
9.	Ballon Beaulonnais (11)	1–4	AL Quinssaines (8)
10.	US Biachette Désertines (10)	0–4	RC Vichy (7)
11.	AC Creuzier-le-Vieux (10)	2–1	US Vendat Bellerive Brugheas (8)
12.	ES Montagne Bourbonnaise (10)	0–2	AA Lapalisse (7)
13.	FC Le Vivre Ensemble (12)	0–11	AS Dompierroise (8)
14.	US Abrest (11)	0–6	AS Cheminots Saint-Germain (8)
15.	Étoile Moulins Yzeure (9)	1–1 (3–1 p)	OC Monetay-sur-Allier (10)
16.	AS Val de Sioule (10)	1–1 (2–3 p)	SCA Cussét (8)
17.	SC Saint-Pourcain (11)	2–7	Bézenet-Doyet Foot (8)
18.	CS Chantelle (11)	0–4	AS Moulins (7)
19.	JS Neuvy (11)	2–3	US Coeur Allier (10)
20.	US Saint-Victor (10)	0–3	CS Vaux-Estivareilles (9)
21.	US Lusigny (10)	2–3	AS Varennes-sur-Allier (9)
22.	US Toque Huriel (11)	1–3	CS Cosne d'Allier (9)
23.	FC Haut d'Allier (10)	5–0	CS Bessay (10)
24.	AS Mayotte FC Bellerive (11)	2–4	FC Châtel-Guyon (7)
25.	FC Artense (10)	2–2 (2–3 p)	FC Ally Mauriac (9)
26.	ES Margeride (11)	0–1	US Saint-Flour (7)
27.	US Crandelles (10)	1–0	Jordanne FC (9)
28.	La Chapelle/Saint-Poncy FC (11)	0–4	Entente Nord Lozère (7)
29.	CS Arpajonnais (9)	1–2	Sporting Châtaigneraie Cantal (8)
30.	Ytrac Foot (9)	1–4	US Murat (8)
31.	US Cère et Landes (11)	1–3	Football en Châtaigneraie Pays de Rance (7)
32.	Sud Cantal Foot (9)	3–2	AS Belbexoise (8)
33.	FC Moussages (10)	1–4	AS Espinat (8)
34.	Aspre FC Fontagnes (11)	0–0 (1–3 p)	AS Pleaux-Rilhac-Barriac (9)
35.	ES Riomois-Condat (10)	0–3	AS Sansacoise (9)
36.	US de la Cère (10)	1–2	FC Junhac-Montsalvy (9)
37.	Ayrens Sport (11)	0–3	US Vallée de l'Authre (7)
38.	AS Vebret-Antignac (12)	0–2	FC Massiac-Molompize-Blesle (9)
39.	Espérance Vieille-Brioude (11)	5–1	ES Pierrefortaise (11)
40.	AS Grazac-Lapte (9)	2–3	Seauve Sports (8)
41.	AS Cheminots Langeac (9)	1–1 (3–1 p)	US Vals Le Puy (9)
42.	Olympique Retournac Beauzac (9)	0–5	Sauveteurs Brivois (7)
43.	AS Emblavez-Vorey (9)	2–3	Olympic Saint-Julien-Chapteuil (8)
44.	AS Pertuis (11)	1–3	AS Chadrac (9)
45.	AS Laussonne (10)	5–5 (5–4 p) (Note: Tie reversed from original draw.)	AG Sainte-Sigolène (9)
46.	FC Saint-Germain-Laprade (9)	1–1 (4–2 p)	US Fontannoise (8)
47.	FC Arzon (10)	0–4	US Brioude (7)
48.	Aiguilhe FC (11)	4–1	SC Langogne (8)
49.	Solignac-Cussac FC (10)	2–2 (3–5 p)	Haut Lignon Football (8)
50.	US Montfaucon Montregard Raucoules (10)	4–2	Velay FC (8)
51.	US Bassoise (11)	1–4	Association Vergongheon-Arvant (8)
52.	AS Saint-Pal-en-Chalencon (11)	0–1	FC Vézézoux (11)
53.	AS Chadron Saint-Martin (11)	2–0	US Lantriac (11)
54.	AS Clermont Toutes Nationalités (12)	1–2	AS Orcines (8)
55.	AS Charmonvillo (12)	0–6	US Beaumontoise (7)
56.	AS Châteaugay (11)	1–1 (0–3 p)	JS Saint-Priest-des-Champs (9)
57.	FC Bouzel (12)	0–3	US Vic-le-Comte (8)
58.	FC Olby-Ceyssat-Mazayes (11)	1–5	CS Volvic (7)
59.	ES Couze Pavin (11)	1–3	Cébazat Sports (9)
60.	Saint-Amant et Tallende SC (10)	5–2	Haute Combraille Foot (10)
61.	US Saint-Georges / Les Ancizes (11)	1–5	US Mozac (7)
62.	AS Job (11)	0–9	Ambert Livradois Sud (8)
63.	AS Royat (10)	1–2	US Ennezat (9)
64.	RC Charbonnières-Paugnat (9)	0–2	Dômes-Sancy Foot (8)
65.	ÉS Saint-Rémy-sur-Durolle (10)	0–7	AS Montferrand Football (8)
66.	ALS Besse Egliseneuve (10)	0–4	AS Saint-Genès-Champanelle (8)
67.	FC Sauxillanges Saint-Babel Brenat (10)	2–4	US Issoire (8)
68.	CS Saint-Bonnet-près-Riom (10)	0–1	US Saint-Beauzire (8)
69.	US Bassin Minier (9)	2–4	Lempdes Sport (8)
70.	US Courpière (9)	3–4	FC Mezel (9)
71.	FC Saint-Julien-de-Coppel (10)	2–5	EFC Saint-Amant-Tallende (7)
72.	CO Veyre-Monton (9)	0–1	FC Cournon-d'Auvergne (7)
73.	AS Enval-Marsat (9)	0–4	Clermont Ouvoimoja (8)
74.	FC Blanzat (9)	0–1	CS Pont-du-Château (8)
75.	US Maringues (9)	2–0	FC Aubierois (9)
76.	FC Martres-Lussat (9)	0–4	AS Saint-Jacques (8)
77.	Aulnat Sportif (9)	2–2 (3–4 p)	FA Le Cendre (7)
78.	AS Romagnat (9)	7–1	ÉS Arconsat (10)
79.	FC Vertaizon (9)	3–1	FC Lezoux (9)
80.	Clermont Métropole FC (9)	2–1	US Les Martres-de-Veyre (9)
81.	UJ Clermontoise (9)	3–2	FC Nord Limagne (10)
82.	ES Fillinges (10)	0–4	Cluses-Scionzier FC (7)
83.	FC Sud Lac (11)	0–5	Aix-les-Bains FC (7)
84.	CS Veigy-Foncenex (11)	1–3	US Annecy-le-Vieux (7)
85.	FC Haute Tarentaise (10)	3–3 (2–4 p)	FC Belle Étoile Mercury (8)
86.	AS Portugais Annecy (12)	0–7	ES Seynod (8)
87.	Olympique Cran (11)	1–5	Entente Val d'Hyères (8)
88.	FC Cranves-Sales (10)	1–1 (3–4 p)	ES Chilly (8)
89.	FC Frangy (11)	3–4	FC Chambotte (8)
90.	JS Reignier (11)	0–4	FC Foron (7)
91.	FC Combloux-Megève (11)	1–4	Montmélian AF (8)
92.	CS Vacheresse Vallée d'Abondance (12)	0–5	ES Tarentaise (7)
93.	FC Chéran (11)	2–10	US Motteraine (8)
94.	CS Amphion Publier (10)	0–1	FC Cluses (8)
95.	UO Albertville (9)	0–1	ES Drumettaz-Mouxy (8)
96.	CS Saint-Pierre (10)	2–2 (7–6 p)	US Semnoz-Vieugy (9)
97.	AS Genevois (10)	1–3	ES Douvaine-Loisin (8)
98.	ES Lanfonnet (10)	5–2	US Grand Mont La Bâthie (11)
99.	US Vétraz-Monthoux (11)	0–7	US Annemasse-Ambilly-Gaillard (8)
100.	ES Meythet (11)	4–1	AS Lac Bleu (10)
101.	ES Valleiry (10)	1–0	US Pringy (8)
102.	FC Vuache (11)	0–2	SS Allinges (9)
103.	AG Bons-en-Chablais (9)	3–3 (3–4 p)	US Divonne (8)
104.	ES Cernex (10)	2–0	FC Marigny (11)
105.	AS Cuines-La Chambre Val d'Arc (10)	3–1	Association Portugais Croix Rouge Chambéry (9)
106.	ES Amancy Cornier (10)	4–0	FC Thônes (11)
107.	FC Saint-Michel Sports (11)	3–3 (4–3 p)	Saint-Pierre SF (9)
108.	Foot Sud Gessien (12)	0–1	CSA Poisy (9)
109.	FC Carroz d’Arâches (12)	0–3	ASC Sallanches (9)
110.	FC Cruseilles (10)	2–0	CS La Balme-de-Sillingy (10)
111.	Foot Sud 74 (12)	2–4	US Pers-Jussy (11)
112.	CA Yennne (11)	1–1 (3–5 p)	FC Villargondran (9)
113.	CA Maurienne (10)	2–1	US Domessin (11)
114.	AS Prévessin-Moëns (10)	2–3	AS Sillingy (9)
115.	Échenevex-Ségny-Chevry Olympique (11)	1–2	ES Saint-Jeoire-La Tour (10)
116.	US Chartreuse Guiers (10)	2–3	FC Balmes Nord-Isère (10)
117.	AS Haute Combe de Savoie (11)	0–5	USC Aiguebelle (9)
118.	FC Villy-le-Pelloux (11)	1–2	Pays de Gex FC (10)
119.	FC Arenthon-Scientrier (13)	3–6	SC Morzine Vallée d'Aulps (9)
120.	Nivolet FC (10)	2–0	FC Laissaud (10)
121.	ABH FC (10)	1–6	AS Saint-Just-Saint-Rambert (8)
122.	FC Roche-Saint-Genest (9)	0–3	Roannais Foot 42 (7)
123.	Anzieux Foot (10)	0–3	Côte Chaude Sportif (8)
124.	CS Germanois (11)	1–4	Lignon Football Couzan (9)
125.	FC Bonson-Saint-Cyprien (10)	– (Note: Match abandoned, reason unknown. US Saint-Galmier-Chambœuf qualified.)	US Saint-Galmier-Chambœuf (8)
126.	AC Ripagerien Rive de Gier (10)	5–3	AF Pays de Coise (8)
127.	JS Cellieu (9)	2–0 (Note: After appeal, JS Cellieu penalised for fielding a suspended player, FC Saint-Étienne qualified.)	FC Saint-Étienne (9)
128.	ES Veauche (9)	2–0	GS Dervaux Chambon-Feugerolles (8)
129.	US Métare Saint-Étienne Sud Est (10)	1–0	AS Chambéon-Magneux (9)
130.	Avenir Côte Foot (10)	3–0	Toranche FC (10)
131.	Riorges FC (10)	2–0	FC Commelle-Vernay (11)
132.	CA Bonnevillois 1921 (11)	2–2 (6–5 p)	FC Leman Presqu'île (11)
133.	GOAL Foot (10)	0–1	Sorbiers-La Talaudière (8)
134.	ES Saint-Jean-Bonnefonds (11)	0–2	AS Savigneux-Montbrison (8)
135.	Rhins Trambouze Foot (10)	0–2	US Ecotay-Moingt (8)
136.	FC Saint-Joseph-Saint-Martin (11)	0–5	ES Saint-Christo-Marcenod (8)
137.	OC Ondaine (11)	1–2	SEL Saint-Priest-en-Jarez (8)
138.	AS Jonzieux (12)	0–11	US Villars (7)
139.	US Parigny Saint-Cyr (11)	0–12	L'Étrat-La Tour Sportif (7)
140.	AS Saint-Just (11)	2–2 (4–3 p)	Haut Pilat Interfoot (10)
141.	SS Ussonaise (12)	1–1 (3–4 p)	Bellegarde Sports (11)
142.	Sury SC (12)	5–4	FC Saint-Martin-la-Sauveté (11)
143.	ES Dyonisienne (11)	5–4	ES Champdieu-Marcilly (11)
144.	Olympique du Montcel (11)	0–6	FC Loire Sornin (8)
145.	US Bussières (11)	1–3	FC Saint-Paul-en-Jarez (7)
146.	FC Mayotte Roanne (11)	5–2	FC Perreux (11)
147.	CS Crémeaux (11)	1–1 (8–7 p)	US Briennon (12)
148.	Nord Roannais (11)	2–2 (5–4 p)	Espérance Croix de l'Orme la Ricamarie (none)
149.	FC Genilac (12)	6–0	Sud Forez Luriecquois FC (12)
150.	ES Nord Drôme (11)	0–7	Olympique Salaise Rhodia (7)
151.	CO Donzère (10)	1–1 (4–5 p)	ASF Pierrelatte (8)
152.	FC Bourg-lès-Valence (10)	2–4	AS Véore Montoison (9)
153.	US Montélier (11)	4–2	FC Chabeuil (8)
154.	FC Portois (11)	2–4	FC Péageois (8)
155.	Vallis Auréa Foot (11)	2–3	FC Annonay (7)
156.	FC Bourguisan (11)	1–3	Football Mont-Pilat (9)
157.	US Ancône (11)	0–3	UMS Montélimar (9)
158.	IF Barbières-Bésayes-Rochefort-Samson-Marches (11)	1–2	US Pont-La Roche (10)
159.	FA Le Teil Melas (11)	1–3	FC Rochegudien (10)
160.	AS des 3 Becs (13)	1–2	FC Valdaine (10)
161.	JS Saint-Paul-lès-Romans (11)	2–3	AAJ Saint-Alban-d'Ay (11)
162.	RC Mauves (11)	2–2 (4–5 p)	AS Roiffieux (11)
163.	FC Colombier Saint-Barthélemy (11)	2–2 (4–5 p)	Entente Sarras Sports Saint-Vallier (10)
164.	AC Allet (12)	0–4	ES Boulieu-lès-Annonay (10)
165.	AF Ceven (12)	6–0	US Vals-les-Bains (12)
166.	US Val d'Ay (11)	4–0	AS Homenetmen Bourg-lès Valence (11)
167.	FR Allan (11)	1–2	AS Berg-Helvie (10)
168.	US Saint-Martinoise (11)	3–2	FC Hermitage (12)
169.	CO Châteauneuf-du-Rhône (11)	1–4	FC Montélimar (9)
170.	FC Muzolais (10)	2–1	RC Tournon-Tain (9)
171.	US Rochemaure (10)	2–2 (3–4 p)	US Drôme Provence (11)
172.	AS Vallée du Doux (12)	2–2 (4–5 p)	Espérance Hostunoise (8)
173.	AS Cancoise (11)	2–3	FC Châtelet (10)
174.	FC Plateau Ardèchois (11)	0–0 (2–4 p)	AS Valensolles (11)
175.	AS Dolon (11)	2–3	FC Rambertois (11)
176.	FC Larnage-Serves (10)	1–4	AS Donatienne (9)
177.	Olympique Centre Ardèche (10)	3–1	ES Chomérac (9)
178.	RC Savasson (11)	1–4	US Saint-Just-Saint-Marcel (9)
179.	FC Hauterives US Grand Serre (10)	1–8	US Davézieux-Vidalon (8)
180.	US Beaufort-Aouste (11)	5–3	US Mours (8)
181.	ES Malissardoise (11)	1–3	ES Beaumonteleger (9)
182.	AS Portugaise Valence (12)	0–3	Rhône Crussol Foot 07 (8)
183.	FC Cheylarois (12)	1–3	FC Eyrieux Embroye (9)
184.	US Vallée du Jabron (10)	1–6	AS Sud Ardèche (7)
185.	Olympique Belleroche Villefranche (9)	0–2	CS Lagnieu (7)
186.	ES Val de Saône (10)	2–3	US Feillens (7)
187.	US Millery-Vourles (9)	1–3	Ain Sud (7)
188.	CS Reyrieux (12)	0–13	FC Côtière-Luenaz (8)
189.	US Replonges (10)	1–2	FC Veyle Sâone (8)
190.	Côtière Meximieux Villieu (10)	2–3	ES Bressane Marboz (8)
191.	Saône Mont d'Or FC (9)	2–2 (4–2 p)	CS Viriat (8)
192.	AS Dortan Lavancia (12)	0–3	ES Revermontoise (8)
193.	ES Foissiat-Étrez (9)	1–4	FC Plaine Tonique (8)
194.	FC Curtafond-Confrançon-Saint-Martin-Saint-Didier (11)	3–7	AS Travailleurs Turcs Oyonnax (8)
195.	ÉS Liergues (10)	1–4	FC Dombes-Bresse (8)
196.	Bresse Foot 01 (10)	0–1	Olympique Buyatin (11)
197.	FC Manziat (10)	1–3	AS Attignat (9)
198.	FC Mont Brouilly (9)	1–1 (3–4 p)	AS Montréal-la-Cluse (8)
199.	FC Lyon Croix-Rousse (10)	1–4	AS Guéreins-Genouilleux (9)
200.	Centre Dombes Football (10)	4–0	AS Hautecourt-Romanèche (10)
201.	FC Serrières-Villebois (11)	1–1 (5–4 p)	Bourg Sud (8)
202.	SC Mille Étangs (11)	3–3 (2–3 p)	FC Bressans (9)
203.	AS Genay (10)	2–3	FC Pays de l'Arbresle (8)
204.	US Culoz Grand Colombier (10)	1–1 (2–4 p)	CS Neuville (7)
205.	FC Artemare Valromey (11)	2–5	FC Colombier-Satolas (8)
206.	AS Buers Villeurbanne (9)	4–0	FC Gerland Lyon (8)
207.	FC Sud Ouest 69 (10)	3–7	Stade Amplepuisien (7)
208.	Chazay FC (11)	2–2 (5–4 p)	FC Pontcharra-Saint-Loup (8)
209.	ES Frontonas-Chamagnieu (11)	1–4	AS Saint-Martin-en-Haut (8)
210.	CS Vaulxois (11)	1–6	SC Ouest Lyonnais (8)
211.	AS Pusignan (9)	0–5	AS Craponne (7)
212.	Olympique Sud Revermont 01 (9)	2–3 (Note: Olympique Lyon Sud penalised for fielding a suspended player, Olympique Sud Revermont 01 qualifed.)	Olympique Lyon Sud (7)
213.	CS Belley (9)	0–1	Olympique Rillieux (8)
214.	US Arbent Marchon (10)	0–1	Olympique Villefontaine 2025 (7)
215.	US Meyzieu (10)	2–4	Sud Lyonnais Foot (7)
216.	US Cheminots Lyon Vaise (11)	0–6	AS Montchat Lyon (7)
217.	FC Meys-Grézieu (10)	1–2	Vénissieux FC (7)
218.	FC Franchevillois (10)	3–5	US Montanay (8)
219.	Noyarey FC (10)	0–2	SO Pont-de-Chéruy-Chavanoz (8)
220.	US Thodure (10)	2–2 (5–3 p)	FC Chaponnay-Marennes (8)
221.	FC Grigny (10)	0–1	Ménival FC (8)
222.	USF Tarare (11)	1–6	Domtac FC (8)
223.	Éveil de Lyon (10)	0–4	JSO Givors (8)
224.	FC Bellignat (13)	0–3	ES Genas Azieu (8)
225.	AS Izernore Nurieux-Volognat (11)	1–2	FC Échirolles (7)
226.	FC Bord de Veyle (10)	0–3	FC Lyon (8)
227.	FC Injoux-Génissiat (12)	2–3	AS Villeurbanne Éveil Lyonnais (8)
228.	Haute Brévenne Football (9)	1–0	UGA Lyon-Décines (8)
229.	FC Tarare (12)	0–5	AS Algerienne Villeurbanne (8)
230.	AS Grosne (11)	3–6	CS Meginand (8)
231.	ES Saint-Priest (10)	1–5	CO Saint-Fons (9)
232.	CS Vienne Football 1955 (12)	3–4	Latino AFC Lyon (10)
233.	Feyzin Club Belle Étoile (9)	1–1 (4–2 p)	US Vaulx-en-Velin (10)
234.	Olympic Sathonay Foot (11)	12–0	Rhône Sud FC (12)
235.	AS Grézieu-la-Varenne (11)	0–3	AS Bron Grand Lyon (9)
236.	ES Gleizé (12)	0–5	Sud Azergues Foot (10)
237.	US Est Lyonnais (11)	3–4	ÉS Trinité Lyon (9)
238.	AS Brignais (9)	6–0	US Loire-Saint-Romain (9)
239.	ACS Mayotte du Rhône (11)	0–5	MOS Trois Rivières (7)
240.	AS Saint-Forgeux (9)	8–1	AL Saint-Maurice-l'Exil (9)
241.	FC Sud Isère (11)	2–5	FC La Tour-Saint-Clair (7)
242.	AS Diémoz (10)	0–7	FC Allobroges Asafia (7)
243.	Artas Charantonnay FC (10)	1–3	OC Eybens (7)
244.	US Reventin (11)	1–3	Football Côte Saint-André (8)
245.	FC Vallée de la Gresse (9)	2–1	FC Crolles-Bernin (8)
246.	AS Toussieu (11)	1–3	FC Varèze (8)
247.	Beaucroissant FC (10)	2–3	AS Domarin (8)
248.	FC Chirens (11)	0–1	AJA Villeneuve (8)
249.	FC Pays Voironnais (9)	1–1 (4–2 p)	US La Murette (9)
250.	AS Saint-André-le-Gaz (10)	0–2	US Creys-Morestel (9)
251.	AS Italienne Européenne Grenoble (10)	3–2	US Village Olympique Grenoble (9)
252.	CF Estrablin (9)	3–2	Saint-Martin-d'Hères FC (10)
253.	FC Charvieu-Chavagneux (9)	2–1	Olympique Saint-Marcellin (8)
254.	Vallée du Guiers FC (10)	1–3	FC La Sure (10)
255.	FC Lauzes (9)	0–0 (4–5 p)	ES Manival (7)
256.	Amicale Tunisienne Saint-Martin-d'Hères (11)	2–0	Formafoot Bièvre Valloire (9)
257.	US Dolomoise (10)	1–2	ES Rachais (7)
258.	US Corbelin (10)	0–4	FC Seyssins (8)
259.	ES Izeaux (12)	0–1	US Gières (9)
260.	Union Nord Iséroise Foot (11)	4–2	Le Grand-Lemps/Colombe/Apprieu Foot 38 (11)
261.	FC Voreppe (12)	4–6	Muroise Foot (10)
262.	FC Mahorais Grenoble (13)	1–0	UO Portugal Saint-Martin-d'Hères (11)
263.	US Abbaye (11)	3–3 (4–5 p)	FC Vallée de l'Hien (12)
264.	MJC Saint-Hilaire-de-la-Côte (12)	2–5	US Ruy Montceau (10)
265.	AS Cheyssieu (12)	1–2	FC Versoud (11)
266.	ASCOL Foot 38 (13)	0–2	USÉ Antonine (12)
267.	US Beauvoir-Royas (12)	0–2	Chaleyssin-Valencin-Luxinay 38 FC (11)
268.	CA Goncelin (12)	1–4	JS Saint-Georgeoise (11)
269.	ASL Saint-Cassien (11)	6–3	FC Liers (12)
270.	ASC Jons (12)	0–12	Association Chandieu-Heyrieux (10)

=== Third round ===
These matches were played on 13 and 14 September 2025.

Third Round Results: Auvergne-Rhône-Alpes
Tie no	Home team (Tier)	Score	Away team (Tier)
1.	FC Billy-Crechy (9)	2–1	JS Saint-Priest-des-Champs (9)
2.	Sury SC (12)	3–0	Stade Saint-Yorre (9)
3.	Olympic Saint-Julien-Chapteuil (8)	6–1	AS Romagnat (9)
4.	UJ Clermontoise (9)	4–9	Sauveteurs Brivois (7)
5.	CS Pont-du-Château (8)	1–2	FC Espaly (6)
6.	AS Chadrac (9)	1–2	US Vic-le-Comte (8)
7.	FC Ally Mauriac (9)	1–5	AS Varennes-sur-Allier (9)
8.	US Murat (8)	4–0	AS Saint-Genès-Champanelle (8)
9.	US Coeur Allier (10)	1–4	US Issoire (8)
10.	AC Creuzier-le-Vieux (10)	1–2	AS Tronget (10)
11.	AS Domérat (7)	1–1 (3–4 p)	AA Lapalisse (7)
12.	FC Vézézoux (11)	0–4	FA Le Cendre (7)
13.	EFC Saint-Amant-Tallende (7)	0–0 (0–3 p)	Bézenet-Doyet Foot (8)
14.	AS Moulins (7)	0–5	US Sucs et Lignon (6)
15.	Bourbon Sportif (8)	1–1 (2–4 p)	SC Avermes (8)
16.	Hauts Lyonnais (5)	0–0 (4–3 p)	FC Riom (6)
17.	Espérance Vieille-Brioude (11)	1–2	AG Sainte-Sigolène (9)
18.	Haut Lignon Football (8)	0–1	AS Espinat (8)
19.	FC Mezel (9)	1–1 (5–4 p)	AS Cheminots Langeac (9)
20.	Ambert Livradois Sud (8)	1–0	Clermont Métropole FC (9)
21.	Association Vergongheon-Arvant (8)	0–2	Lempdes Sport (8)
22.	SCA Cussét (8)	0–1	Espérance Ceyratois Football (6)
23.	Football en Châtaigneraie Pays de Rance (7)	2–2 (4–3 p)	Aurillac FC (6)
24.	AS Pleaux-Rilhac-Barriac (9)	2–2 (0–3 p)	Sud Cantal Foot (9)
25.	AS Montluçon Chatelard (10)	2–3	AS Orcines (8)
26.	US Crandelles (10)	0–10	Moulins Yzeure Foot (5)
27.	FC Junhac-Montsalvy (9)	0–2	US Brioude (7)
28.	AS Sansacoise (9)	1–1 (6–7 p)	Entente Nord Lozère (7)
29.	CS Vaux-Estivareilles (9)	1–3	FC Cournon-d'Auvergne (7)
30.	Étoile Moulins Yzeure (9)	1–0	US Monistrol (6)
31.	US Vallée de l'Authre (7)	1–2	US Saint-Flour (7)
32.	AS Saint-Jacques (8)	2–2 (7–6 p)	Sporting Châtaigneraie Cantal (8)
33.	US Beaumontoise (7)	2–1	Dômes-Sancy Foot (8)
34.	Clermont Ouvoimoja (8)	1–3	AS Montferrand Football (8)
35.	Saint-Amant et Tallende SC (10)	1–0	AS Chadron Saint-Martin (11)
36.	US Montfaucon Montregard Raucoules (10)	1–0	FC Vertaizon (9)
37.	US Mozac (7)	0–2	SA Thiers (6)
38.	AS Dompierroise (8)	2–1	FC Châtel-Guyon (7)
39.	FC Haut d'Allier (10)	3–1	US Saint-Beauzire (8)
40.	Aiguilhe FC (11)	3–2	FC Massiac-Molompize-Blesle (9)
41.	US Ennezat (9)	0–2	US Maringues (9)
42.	CS Cosne d'Allier (9)	0–2	US Blavozy (6)
43.	AL Quinssaines (8)	3–0	FC Souvigny (9)
44.	CS Volvic (7)	3–1	AS Cheminots Saint-Germain (8)
45.	Cébazat Sports (9)	2–4	Seauve Sports (8)
46.	RC Vichy (7)	0–1	FC Chamalières (5)
47.	AS Savigneux-Montbrison (8)	1–1 (4–3 p)	Montluçon Football (6)
48.	FC Saint-Germain-Laprade (9)	0–4	Roannais Foot 42 (7)
49.	ES Douvaine-Loisin (8)	2–6	ES Seynod (8)
50.	ES Revermontoise (8)	5–4	FC Belle Étoile Mercury (8)
51.	AS Attignat (9)	0–1	Ain Sud (7)
52.	US Feillens (7)	0–2	AS Misérieux-Trévoux (6)
53.	ES Bressane Marboz (8)	2–2 (2–4 p)	FC Foron (7)
54.	AS Travailleurs Turcs Oyonnax (8)	1–3	Thonon Evian Grand Genève FC (5)
55.	US Pers-Jussy (11)	1–1 (4–5 p)	US Divonne (8)
56.	Pays de Gex FC (10)	6–0	FC Serrières-Villebois (11)
57.	FC Bressans (9)	1–1 (4–2 p)	FC Cruseilles (10)
58.	ES Meythet (11)	3–3 (6–5 p)	CSA Poisy (9)
59.	ES Lanfonnet (10)	3–6	US Annecy-le-Vieux (7)
60.	ES Cernex (10)	1–2	US Annemasse-Ambilly-Gaillard (8)
61.	ASC Sallanches (9)	1–2	SS Allinges (9)
62.	CS Saint-Pierre (10)	8–0	ES Chilly (8)
63.	ES Saint-Jeoire-La Tour (10)	4–1	CA Bonnevillois 1921 (11)
64.	ES Valleiry (10)	1–1 (3–1 p)	ES Amancy Cornier (10)
65.	AS Montréal-la-Cluse (8)	0–0 (3–2 p)	Cluses-Scionzier FC (7)
66.	Olympique Buyatin (11)	3–4	AS Sillingy (9)
67.	Centre Dombes Football (10)	0–4	FC Saint-Cyr Collonges au Mont d'Or (6)
68.	SC Morzine Vallée d'Aulps (9)	1–3	Oyonnax Plastics Vallée FC (6)
69.	FC La Sure (10)	1–3	FC Villargondran (9)
70.	FC Mahorais Grenoble (13)	1–1 (0–3 p)	Nivolet FC (10)
71.	ASL Saint-Cassien (11)	4–6	FC Cluses (8)
72.	FC Vallée de l'Hien (12)	2–2 (4–2 p)	Montmélian AF (8)
73.	JS Saint-Georgeoise (11)	0–2	AJA Villeneuve (8)
74.	FC Saint-Michel Sports (11)	0–4	US Motteraine (8)
75.	USÉ Antonine (12)	1–2	AS Bron Grand Lyon (9)
76.	FC Vallée de la Gresse (9)	3–3 (2–4 p)	ES Tarentaise (7)
77.	FC Balmes Nord-Isère (10)	1–0	Amicale Tunisienne Saint-Martin-d'Hères (11)
78.	Aix-les-Bains FC (7)	2–1	FC Chambotte (8)
79.	SO Pont-de-Chéruy-Chavanoz (8)	3–0	Olympique Sud Revermont 01 (9)
80.	FC Versoud (11)	1–3	Football Côte Saint-André (8)
81.	AS Cuines-La Chambre Val d'Arc (10)	2–2 (5–4 p)	FC Seyssins (8)
82.	FC Échirolles (7)	3–3 (2–3 p)	Chambéry SF (5)
83.	Association Chandieu-Heyrieux (10)	0–3	FC Varèze (8)
84.	AS Italienne Européenne Grenoble (10)	3–0 (Note: Tie reversed from original draw.)	Union Nord Iséroise Foot (11)
85.	US Gières (9)	5–1	USC Aiguebelle (9)
86.	ES Drumettaz-Mouxy (8)	1–1 (4–3 p)	Chassieu Décines FC (6)
87.	CA Maurienne (10)	1–1 (4–3 p)	Entente Val d'Hyères (8)
88.	FC La Tour-Saint-Clair (7)	5–2	ES Manival (7)
89.	FC Pays Voironnais (9)	0–1	AC Seyssinet (5)
90.	US Montélier (11)	0–7	FC Charvieu-Chavagneux (9)
91.	AS Roiffieux (11)	0–4	US Davézieux-Vidalon (8)
92.	FC Valdaine (10)	2–5	JSO Givors (8)
93.	FC Châtelet (10)	1–0	FC Vaulx-en-Velin (6)
94.	AS Véore Montoison (9)	3–1	FC Colombier-Satolas (8)
95.	AAJ Saint-Alban-d'Ay (11)	0–3	FC Rhône Vallées (6)
96.	US Saint-Martinoise (11)	2–2 (7–8 p)	US Beaufort-Aouste (11)
97.	ES Boulieu-lès-Annonay (10)	0–2	Espérance Hostunoise (8)
98.	ES Beaumonteleger (9)	0–2	MOS Trois Rivières (7)
99.	FC Rochegudien (10)	1–2	US Val d'Ay (11)
100.	Ménival FC (8)	1–3	Rhône Crussol Foot 07 (8)
101.	FC Annonay (7)	1–1 (1–4 p)	Vénissieux FC (7)
102.	US Drôme Provence (11)	2–1	Sud Lyonnais Foot (7)
103.	Olympique Centre Ardèche (10)	0–5	AS Sud Ardèche (7)
104.	AS Valensolles (11)	2–0	SC Ouest Lyonnais (8)
105.	FC Eyrieux Embroye (9)	1–5	FC Bourgoin-Jallieu (5)
106.	US Saint-Just-Saint-Marcel (9)	2–0	AS Algerienne Villeurbanne (8)
107.	AF Ceven (12)	1–1 (5–4 p)	CS Meginand (8)
108.	FC Montélimar (9)	0–0 (5–6 p)	FC Allobroges Asafia (7)
109.	AS Donatienne (9)	4–2	AS Berg-Helvie (10)
110.	ASF Pierrelatte (8)	4–0	FC Péageois (8)
111.	US Ruy Montceau (10)	1–2	OC Eybens (7)
112.	US Montanay (8)	3–3 (5–4 p)	AS Villeurbanne Éveil Lyonnais (8)
113.	FC Pays de l'Arbresle (8)	1–2	FC Côtière-Luenaz (8)
114.	FC Rambertois (11)	2–3	CF Estrablin (9)
115.	US Creys-Morestel (9)	0–2	ES Rachais (7)
116.	AS Buers Villeurbanne (9)	6–3	US Thodure (10)
117.	FC Muzolais (10)	0–1	Feyzin Club Belle Étoile (9)
118.	Chaleyssin-Valencin-Luxinay 38 FC (11)	1–3	AS Guéreins-Genouilleux (9)
119.	Entente Sarras Sports Saint-Vallier (10)	1–2	Olympique Rillieux (8)
120.	FC Plaine Tonique (8)	0–3	Lyon-La Duchère (5)
121.	FC Lyon (8)	4–1	Saône Mont d'Or FC (9)
122.	AS Domarin (8)	1–1 (2–4 p)	Entente Crest-Aouste (6)
123.	Olympic Sathonay Foot (11)	1–1 (2–3 p)	CS Lagnieu (7)
124.	Muroise Foot (10)	2–5	L'Étrat-La Tour Sportif (7)
125.	ÉS Trinité Lyon (9)	2–4	Olympique Villefontaine 2025 (7)
126.	UMS Montélimar (9)	0–1	AS Montchat Lyon (7)
127.	US Pont-La Roche (10)	0–6	Olympique de Valence (6)
128.	FC Veyle Sâone (8)	5–0	CO Saint-Fons (9)
129.	FC Genilac (12)	0–11	FC Dombes-Bresse (8)
130.	Latino AFC Lyon (10)	5–2	ES Genas Azieu (8)
131.	AS Saint-Martin-en-Haut (8)	1–4	AS Saint-Forgeux (9)
132.	AS Saint-Just (11)	0–7	FCO Firminy-Insersport (6)
133.	ES Saint-Christo-Marcenod (8)	3–2	AS Saint-Just-Saint-Rambert (8)
134.	FC Mayotte Roanne (11)	1–4	AS Chavanay (6)
135.	US Métare Saint-Étienne Sud Est (10)	0–0 (8–7 p)	Sorbiers-La Talaudière (8)
136.	ES Dyonisienne (11)	1–5	FC Saint-Paul-en-Jarez (7)
137.	US Villars (7)	5–0	SEL Saint-Priest-en-Jarez (8)
138.	FC Saint-Étienne (9)	2–1	Avenir Côte Foot (10)
139.	Chazay FC (11)	0–9	US Feurs (5)
140.	Nord Roannais (11)	3–2	FC Loire Sornin (8)
141.	Football Mont-Pilat (9)	0–1	Riorges FC (10)
142.	Sud Azergues Foot (10)	2–0	Olympique Salaise Rhodia (7)
143.	US Ecotay-Moingt (8)	3–3 (4–2 p)	AS Brignais (9)
144.	AS Craponne (7)	0–0 (5–6 p)	Domtac FC (8)
145.	Lignon Football Couzan (9)	2–2 (5–4 p)	Haute Brévenne Football (9)
146.	Bellegarde Sports (11)	1–2	ES Veauche (9)
147.	US Saint-Galmier-Chambœuf (8)	4–2	Stade Amplepuisien (7)
148.	AC Ripagerien Rive de Gier (10)	2–3	CS Neuville (7)
149.	CS Crémeaux (11)	0–1	Côte Chaude Sportif (8)

=== Fourth round ===
These matches were played on 27 and 28 September 2025.

Fourth Round Results: Auvergne-Rhône-Alpes
Tie no	Home team (Tier)	Score	Away team (Tier)
1.	AS Espinat (8)	1–1 (5–3 p)	Espérance Ceyratois Football (6)
2.	Saint-Amant et Tallende SC (10)	2–3	Olympic Saint-Julien-Chapteuil (8)
3.	FA Le Cendre (7)	0–0 (3–5 p)	US Murat (8)
4.	FC Billy-Crechy (9)	0–2	Entente Nord Lozère (7)
5.	US Maringues (9)	0–2	US Brioude (7)
6.	SA Thiers (6)	0–1	Andrézieux-Bouthéon FC (4)
7.	Sud Cantal Foot (9)	1–3	AS Saint-Jacques (8)
8.	AS Orcines (8)	0–5	FC Chamalières (5)
9.	FC Cournon-d'Auvergne (7)	5–0	Football en Châtaigneraie Pays de Rance (7)
10.	Aiguilhe FC (11)	0–5	AS Montferrand Football (8)
11.	US Montfaucon Montregard Raucoules (10)	2–4	US Blavozy (6)
12.	FC Mezel (9)	3–4	FC Haut d'Allier (10)
13.	US Saint-Flour (7)	2–2 (5–6 p)	US Vic-le-Comte (8)
14.	Lempdes Sport (8)	0–0 (3–2 p)	US Issoire (8)
15.	SC Avermes (8)	0–1	Roannais Foot 42 (7)
16.	Sauveteurs Brivois (7)	4–2	AL Quinssaines (8)
17.	Sury SC (12)	3–3 (4–3 p)	FC Espaly (6)
18.	AS Tronget (10)	2–7	US Ecotay-Moingt (8)
19.	Riorges FC (10)	1–1 (1–3 p)	AA Lapalisse (7)
20.	Côte Chaude Sportif (8)	1–2	Ambert Livradois Sud (8)
21.	AS Varennes-sur-Allier (9)	2–1	FCO Firminy-Insersport (6)
22.	Bézenet-Doyet Foot (8)	1–4	AG Sainte-Sigolène (9)
23.	Seauve Sports (8)	1–1 (3–2 p)	Étoile Moulins Yzeure (9)
24.	Nord Roannais (11)	0–1	US Beaumontoise (7)
25.	AS Dompierroise (8)	0–0 (4–3 p)	CS Volvic (7)
26.	US Sucs et Lignon (6)	0–3	Moulins Yzeure Foot (5)
27.	US Villars (7)	1–1 (3–4 p)	FC Limonest Dardilly Saint-Didier (4)
28.	ES Veauche (9)	0–3	US Feurs (5)
29.	AS Cuines-La Chambre Val d'Arc (10)	0–3	FC Bressans (9)
30.	Pays de Gex FC (10)	1–0	FC Veyle Sâone (8)
31.	SS Allinges (9)	5–0	ES Valleiry (10)
32.	CS Saint-Pierre (10)	0–4	GFA Rumilly-Vallières (4)
33.	ES Saint-Jeoire-La Tour (10)	0–5	FC Cluses (8)
34.	ES Meythet (11)	2–1	CS Lagnieu (7)
35.	US Motteraine (8)	3–3 (5–6 p)	AS Montréal-la-Cluse (8)
36.	US Annecy-le-Vieux (7)	4–1	Oyonnax Plastics Vallée FC (6)
37.	AS Guéreins-Genouilleux (9)	4–4 (3–1 p)	ES Seynod (8)
38.	Olympique Villefontaine 2025 (7)	1–0	Chambéry SF (5)
39.	ES Revermontoise (8)	1–1 (4–3 p)	US Montanay (8)
40.	AS Sillingy (9)	5–0	Nivolet FC (10)
41.	ES Tarentaise (7)	0–3	Thonon Evian Grand Genève FC (5)
42.	FC Foron (7)	1–2	FC Bourgoin-Jallieu (5)
43.	US Divonne (8)	6–1	FC Villargondran (9)
44.	US Annemasse-Ambilly-Gaillard (8)	1–3	Aix-les-Bains FC (7)
45.	FC Charvieu-Chavagneux (9)	0–0 (3–2 p)	OC Eybens (7)
46.	FC Vallée de l'Hien (12)	1–2	CA Maurienne (10)
47.	AJA Villeneuve (8)	0–0 (2–4 p)	FC Saint-Étienne (9)
48.	ES Rachais (7)	2–1	SO Pont-de-Chéruy-Chavanoz (8)
49.	Haute Brévenne Football (9)	0–5	CS Neuville (7)
50.	Ain Sud (7)	0–1	ES Drumettaz-Mouxy (8)
51.	Lyon-La Duchère (5)	3–1	AS Misérieux-Trévoux (6)
52.	US Davézieux-Vidalon (8)	5–0	AS Saint-Forgeux (9)
53.	AS Savigneux-Montbrison (8)	2–0	US Gières (9)
54.	Sud Azergues Foot (10)	0–0 (4–3 p)	FC Côtière-Luenaz (8)
55.	Latino AFC Lyon (10)	1–3	FC Dombes-Bresse (8)
56.	FC Balmes Nord-Isère (10)	0–4	FC Allobroges Asafia (7)
57.	US Métare Saint-Étienne Sud Est (10)	1–3	Olympique de Valence (6)
58.	Football Côte Saint-André (8)	3–2	AS Buers Villeurbanne (9)
59.	Espérance Hostunoise (8)	0–4	AS Chavanay (6)
60.	FC La Tour-Saint-Clair (7)	0–5	AS Saint-Priest (4)
61.	AS Sud Ardèche (7)	3–1	ES Saint-Christo-Marcenod (8)
62.	FC Châtelet (10)	4–4 (3–4 p)	Entente Crest-Aouste (6)
63.	Domtac FC (8)	3–2	FC Lyon (8)
64.	AS Montchat Lyon (7)	0–0 (4–5 p)	Hauts Lyonnais (5)
65.	JSO Givors (8)	8–1	FC Varèze (8)
66.	AS Italienne Européenne Grenoble (10)	0–8	AC Seyssinet (5)
67.	AS Valensolles (11)	1–3	FC Rhône Vallées (6)
68.	US Val d'Ay (11)	2–1	Vénissieux FC (7)
69.	AF Ceven (12)	0–2	US Saint-Galmier-Chambœuf (8)
70.	US Beaufort-Aouste (11)	0–5	MOS Trois Rivières (7)
71.	CF Estrablin (9)	0–4	GOAL FC (4)
72.	Rhône Crussol Foot 07 (8)	1–3	L'Étrat-La Tour Sportif (7)
73.	Olympique Rillieux (8)	2–0	AS Donatienne (9)
74.	US Saint-Just-Saint-Marcel (9)	1–2	FC Saint-Paul-en-Jarez (7)
75.	US Drôme Provence (11)	1–4	AS Véore Montoison (9)
76.	AS Bron Grand Lyon (9)	0–2	FC Saint-Cyr Collonges au Mont d'Or (6)
77.	Feyzin Club Belle Étoile (9)	1–1 (3–5 p)	ASF Pierrelatte (8)

=== Fifth round ===
These matches were played on 10, 11 and 12 October 2025.

Fifth Round Results: Auvergne-Rhône-Alpes
Tie no	Home team (Tier)	Score	Away team (Tier)
1.	AS Montferrand Football (8)	0–2	Andrézieux-Bouthéon FC (4)
2.	AS Varennes-sur-Allier (9)	0–2	AA Lapalisse (7)
3.	FC Saint-Étienne (9)	0–0 (4–3 p)	AS Dompierroise (8)
4.	US Vic-le-Comte (8)	1–0	AS Saint-Jacques (8)
5.	AG Sainte-Sigolène (9)	0–0 (3–4 p)	US Murat (8)
6.	Seauve Sports (8)	2–0	Moulins Yzeure Foot (5)
7.	Lempdes Sport (8)	0–0 (2–3 p)	FC Cournon-d'Auvergne (7)
8.	Entente Nord Lozère (7)	7–1	Ambert Livradois Sud (8)
9.	AS Espinat (8)	0–2	Le Puy Foot 43 Auvergne (3)
10.	US Blavozy (6)	4–0	US Beaumontoise (7)
11.	FC Haut d'Allier (10)	0–6	FC Chamalières (5)
12.	US Brioude (7)	0–1	Olympic Saint-Julien-Chapteuil (8)
13.	Sauveteurs Brivois (7)	0–4	Hauts Lyonnais (5)
14.	Sud Azergues Foot (10)	0–2	FC Saint-Paul-en-Jarez (7)
15.	ES Revermontoise (8)	3–0	US Divonne (8)
16.	CS Neuville (7)	1–1 (3–2 p)	FC Limonest Dardilly Saint-Didier (4)
17.	CA Maurienne (10)	1–2	ES Meythet (11)
18.	Thonon Evian Grand Genève FC (5)	2–0	Entente Crest-Aouste (6)
19.	Pays de Gex FC (10)	2–2 (1–4 p)	AS Montréal-la-Cluse (8)
20.	Football Côte Saint-André (8)	0–2	Olympique de Valence (6)
21.	AS Guéreins-Genouilleux (9)	4–2	Aix-les-Bains FC (7)
22.	FC Cluses (8)	1–4	SS Allinges (9)
23.	US Annecy-le-Vieux (7)	0–1	Lyon-La Duchère (5)
24.	FC Dombes-Bresse (8)	1–1 (5–6 p)	ES Drumettaz-Mouxy (8)
25.	FC Bressans (9)	3–2	AS Sillingy (9)
26.	FC Allobroges Asafia (7)	1–4	Football Bourg-en-Bresse Péronnas 01 (3)
27.	Roannais Foot 42 (7)	0–6	GFA Rumilly-Vallières (4)
28.	US Val d'Ay (11)	1–1 (2–4 p)	FC Charvieu-Chavagneux (9)
29.	L'Étrat-La Tour Sportif (7)	2–2 (6–5 p)	GOAL FC (4)
30.	Sury SC (12)	2–5	ASF Pierrelatte (8)
31.	AS Véore Montoison (9)	2–3	AS Savigneux-Montbrison (8)
32.	US Saint-Galmier-Chambœuf (8)	0–1	FC Saint-Cyr Collonges au Mont d'Or (6)
33.	FC Bourgoin-Jallieu (5)	1–2	US Feurs (5)
34.	Olympique Rillieux (8)	4–0	ES Rachais (7)
35.	JSO Givors (8)	3–4	AS Chavanay (6)
36.	Domtac FC (8)	1–1 (2–4 p)	AC Seyssinet (5)
37.	AS Sud Ardèche (7)	0–1	AS Saint-Priest (4)
38.	Olympique Villefontaine 2025 (7)	0–0 (6–5 p)	FC Villefranche Beaujolais (3)
39.	US Davézieux-Vidalon (8)	3–4	FC Rhône Vallées (6)
40.	US Ecotay-Moingt (8)	1–0	MOS Trois Rivières (7)

=== Sixth round ===
These matches were played on 25 and 26 October 2025.

Sixth Round Results: Auvergne-Rhône-Alpes
Tie no	Home team (Tier)	Score	Away team (Tier)
1.	US Vic-le-Comte (8)	0–4	US Feurs (5)
2.	FC Chamalières (5)	1–1 (5–4 p)	Olympique de Valence (6)
3.	US Murat (8)	1–3	Entente Nord Lozère (7)
4.	AS Savigneux-Montbrison (8)	2–0	FC Saint-Étienne (9)
5.	Olympic Saint-Julien-Chapteuil (8)	1–5	US Ecotay-Moingt (8)
6.	AS Chavanay (6)	0–2	Andrézieux-Bouthéon FC (4)
7.	AA Lapalisse (7)	2–1	US Blavozy (6)
8.	Seauve Sports (8)	0–4	Hauts Lyonnais (5)
9.	FC Cournon-d'Auvergne (7)	0–5	Le Puy Foot 43 Auvergne (3)
10.	ES Meythet (11)	1–1 (4–5 p)	Olympique Villefontaine 2025 (7)
11.	ES Revermontoise (8)	1–10	Lyon-La Duchère (5)
12.	FC Rhône Vallées (6)	2–0	CS Neuville (7)
13.	ASF Pierrelatte (8)	5–1	FC Saint-Paul-en-Jarez (7)
14.	AS Montréal-la-Cluse (8)	2–1	FC Charvieu-Chavagneux (9)
15.	SS Allinges (9)	3–3 (16–15 p)	FC Bressans (9)
16.	AS Guéreins-Genouilleux (9)	0–1	Thonon Evian Grand Genève FC (5)
17.	Football Bourg-en-Bresse Péronnas 01 (3)	3–3 (4–3 p)	GFA Rumilly-Vallières (4)
18.	AC Seyssinet (5)	2–1	AS Saint-Priest (4)
19.	Olympique Rillieux (8)	0–1	FC Saint-Cyr Collonges au Mont d'Or (6)
20.	ES Drumettaz-Mouxy (8)	0–3	L'Étrat-La Tour Sportif (7)
