= Romain Dedola =

French footballer (born 1989)

Personal information
- Full name: Romain Dedola
- Date of birth: 2 January 1989 (age 37)
- Place of birth: Rillieux-la-Pape, France
- Height: 1.67 m (5 ft 6 in)
- Position: Midfielder

Team information
- Current team: Hauts Lyonnais

Youth career
- Lyon
- Strasbourg

Senior career*
Years	Team	Apps	(Gls)
2009–2010	Strasbourg	3	(0)
2010–2012	FC Ingolstadt	15	(0)
2011	FC Ingolstadt II	1	(0)
2012–2013	Jahn Regensburg	11	(0)
2013	Monts d'Or Azergues	13	(3)
2013–2014	Lyon-Duchère	21	(2)
2014–2017	Villefranche	69	(9)
2017–2018	Andrézieux	24	(3)
2018–2019	Ain Sud	4	(1)
2019–	Hauts Lyonnais	27	(5)

International career
	France U19	3	(1)
- * Club domestic league appearances and goals as of 00:57, 3 December 2021 (UTC)

Romain Dedola (born 2 January 1989) is a French professional footballer who plays as a midfielder for Championnat National 3 club Hauts Lyonnais.

== Career statistics ==
As of match played 20 November 2021

Appearances and goals by club, season and competition
Club	Season	League			National Cup		Other		Total	
Club	Season	Division	Apps	Goals	Apps	Goals	Apps	Goals	Apps	Goals
Strasbourg	2009–10	Ligue 2	2	0	0	0	—		2	0
Ingolstadt 04	2010–11	2. Bundesliga	14	0	1	0	—		15	0
Ingolstadt 04	2011–12	2. Bundesliga	1	0	0	0	—		1	0
Ingolstadt 04	Total		15	0	1	0	—		16	0
Ingolstadt 04 II	2011–12	Regionalliga Bayern	1	0	—		—		1	0
Jahn Regensburg	2011–12	3. Liga	11	0	0	0	0	0	11	0
Monts d'Or Azergues	2012–13	CFA	13	3	0	0	—		13	3
Lyon-Duchère	2013–14	CFA	21	2	1	0	—		22	2
Villefranche	2014–15	CFA	22	2	0	0	—		22	2
Villefranche	2015–16	CFA	24	3	1	0	—		25	3
Villefranche	2016–17	CFA	23	4	0	0	—		23	4
Villefranche	Total		69	9	1	0	—		70	9
Andrézieux	2017–18	National 2	24	3	2	1	—		26	4
Ain Sud	2018–19	National 3	4	1	0	0	—		4	1
Hauts Lyonnais	2019–20	National 3	15	3	1	0	—		16	3
Hauts Lyonnais	2020–21	National 3	5	1	0	0	—		5	1
Hauts Lyonnais	2021–22	National 3	7	1	1	0	—		8	1
Hauts Lyonnais	Total		27	5	2	0	—		29	5
Career total			187	23	7	1	0	0	194	24
