= Hauts Lyonnais =

Football club based in Pomeys, France

- Founded: 2012; 14 years ago
- Ground: Stade de la Neylière
- Capacity: 1,000
- President: Bruno Lacand
- Manager: Ahmed Aït Ouarab
- League: National 1
- 2025–26: National 3 Group G, 1st of 14 (promoted)
- Website: http://hautslyonnais.footeo.com/

Hauts Lyonnais is a football club based in Pomeys, France. Founded in 2012, it competes in the Championnat National 1, the fourth tier of the French football pyramid after promotion from National 3 in 2025–26. The club's colours are violet and light blue.

== History ==
Hauts Lyonnais was founded in 2012

In 2025–26 season, Hauts Lyonnais secure promotion to Championnat National 1 from next season after finishing first place in Group G and became champions of National 3.

== Squad ==
As of 2 December 2021

Note: Flags indicate national team as defined under FIFA eligibility rules; some limited exceptions apply. Players may hold more than one non-FIFA nationality.

| No. | Pos. | Nation | Player |
|---|---|---|---|
| — | GK | FRA | Andy Besset |
| — | GK | FRA | Baptiste Dumas |
| — | GK | FRA | Florent Moulin |
| — | GK | FRA | Nicolas Petit |
| — | GK | FRA | Isidore Tissot |
| — | DF | FRA | Thomas Bazin |
| — | DF | FRA | Pierre-Luc Desvignes |
| — | DF | FRA | Mathieu Gonçalves |
| — | DF | FRA | Elie Lacour |
| — | DF | FRA | Romain Poncet |
| — | DF | FRA | Mathis Royet |
| — | DF | FRA | Leny Sayad |
| — | MF | FRA | Hilal Bouguerra |

| No. | Pos. | Nation | Player |
|---|---|---|---|
| — | MF | FRA | Johan Champsaur |
| — | MF | FRA | Romain Dedola |
| — | MF | FRA | Claude Jacquet |
| — | MF | FRA | Aurélien Javelle |
| — | MF | FRA | Alan Lacand |
| — | MF | FRA | Ryan Lacand |
| — | MF | FRA | Francis Robert |
| — | MF | FRA | Victor Véricel |
| — | FW | ALG | Mohamed Boussaïd |
| — | FW | FRA | Mathis Chambriard |
| — | FW | FRA | Yassine Fortas |
| — | FW | FRA | Mour Paye |
| — | FW | FRA | Adrien Valente |
